= Tokooos =

Studio album by Fally Ipupa
- Released: July 7, 2017
- Recorded: 2015–2017
- Studios: Studio 18; Studios du Futur de l'Audiovisuel; Studio Feenix
- Genres: R&B; hip-hop; Congolese rumba; ndombolo
- Length: 60:49
- Labels: Elektra France; Warner Music France
- Producers: Junior Alaprod; Julio Masidi; Glory; DSK on the beat; Double X; Le Motif; BoussBouss; Guy Hervé Imboua; John Makabi; Christian Dessart; Rachid Mir; Fally Ipupa

Fally Ipupa chronology
Power "Kosa Leka" (2013)	Tokooos (2017)	Control (2018)

Singles from Tokooos
- 1. "Kiname" Released: December 7, 2016; 2. "Eloko Oyo" Released: April 7, 2017; 3. "Bad Boy" Released: June 16, 2017; 4. "Jeudi Soir" Released: June 26, 2017

Tokooos is the fourth studio album by Congolese singer-songwriter Fally Ipupa. It was released on 7 July 2017 by Elektra France and distributed by Warner Music France. It consists of 18 tracks, which feature guest appearances from Wizkid, Aya Nakamura, Booba, MHD, Naza, KeBlack, Shay, and R. Kelly.

After establishing himself as one of the leading continental artists in Africa with his first three albums (Droit Chemin, Arsenal de Belles Melodies, and Power "Kosa Leka"), all produced by David Monsoh, Ipupa sought to expand his career toward the French and generally Western music markets. In 2013, he signed with Julien Creuzard at AZ, a subsidiary of Universal Music, before following Creuzard in 2016 to the newly created Elektra France label. Musically, Tokooos incorporates urban and contemporary sounds with the foundations of Congolese rumba. It introduced Ipupa's tokooos music, a stylistic fusion of Congolese rumba, ndombolo, contemporary R&B, hip-hop, Afropop, and zouk.

Tokooos received mostly positive reviews, with critics praising Ipupa's attempt to modernize Congolese rumba while keeping its roots. The album was nonetheless criticized for its limited use of Lingala and its departure from traditional Congolese rumba, although it still performed well commercially. Tokooos entered France's SNEP Top Albums chart at number 28, giving Ipupa his first appearance on the French album charts. The album later reached number 21 on Belgium's Ultratop Wallonia chart and number 110 on the Ultratop Flanders chart. In France, it stayed in the Top Albums 200 for 23 weeks and was certified gold by the SNEP, making Ipupa the first Kinshasa-based artist and the first solo performer from Central Africa to receive the certification. Tokooos also became his first album to receive a platinum certification from the Centre National de la Musique. Africa Music & Charts gave the album a sextuple diamond certification, making it the most certified album by a solo artist.

== Background ==
In April 2013, just a few days after releasing his third album, Power "Kosa Leka", Ipupa signed a deal with the AZ label of the major Universal Music Group. The three-album deal focused on creating music with more urban sounds and some elements of Congolese rumba. His first three albums, Droit Chemin, Arsenal de Belles Melodies, and Power "Kosa Leka", primarily blended Congolese rumba and ndombolo with contemporary R&B, hip hop, and pop.

Before devoting himself to the realization of his third urban album, Ipupa takes care of putting forward his own label F'Victeam, which also operated as a backing band. On 5 May 2014, he released "Original" to promote the label. He then produced and directed F'Victeam's debut studio album, Libre Parcours, a double album of twenty-three tracks where twenty members will have the chance to compose and, at times, perform a track. Ipupa also appeared as a guest artist on seven tracks. The album was released on 10 March 2015.

== Composition and production ==
In mid-2013, Ipupa revealed that his forthcoming international album would be titled Neti Na Film, an aphorism translating to "Like in a movie", which encapsulates his new catchphrase. In October 2015, he announced a collaboration with Nigerian singer Wizkid. In May 2016, music executive Julien Creuzard left AZ to launch Elektra France. Ipupa then signed with the new label. Alexis Putterflam, the label's managing director, said Elektra France wanted to introduce Ipupa to a larger international audience. According to Putterflam, Ipupa also wanted to reach a wider audience and trusted the team to respect his music, his home country, and the true meaning of his art.

On 13 June 2017, the project's name, cover art, and track list were unveiled, revealing that the album would be titled Tokooos and would consists of eighteen tracks. Ipupa told Le Monde that the team recorded thirty tracks, though fewer than two-thirds made the final cut. According to Nkumu Isaac Katalay Diallo, writing for Afropop Worldwide, the term tokooos is derived from the Lingala word kitoko, meaning "something good" or "a good vibe". Ipupa adapted the root -toko into tokos, a term he coined that ultimately became the foundation of his new artistic identity and musical philosophy, known as tokooos music. Tokooos music is therefore conceived as "good music" that emphasizes positivity and accessibility, and blends Congolese musical roots with a mainstream, urban, and highly open approach. Ipupa explained that the aim was to reach listeners beyond the usual Congolese rumba audience and introduce his music to a wider audience, viewing Tokooos as a potential breakthrough into the European, particularly Afro-francophone music scene. In interviews with a France-based BET Buzz affiliate and Paris Match, he stated wanted the album to act like "a bridge between Kinshasa and Paris" to "win over the French market". Ipupa said he designed Tokooos to be open-minded and collaborative, composed of shorter tracks without mabanga, while still preserving the authenticity of Congolese guitar within more urban soundscapes.

Tokooos was officially released on 7 July 2017, a date Ipupa picked because of its symbolic repetition of the number seven (07/07/17), which are often traditionally linked to ideas of perfection and completeness, something that strongly resonated with his fandom. It deviated from his previous work, as it embraces an urban fusion of Congolese rumba, contemporary R&B, French hip-hop, and ndombolo, and was developed in collaboration with French and Belgian composers and producers, including Junior Alaprod, Le Motif, Christian Dessart, and Julio Masidi. With the exception of Power "Kosa Leka", which features only artists of African descent, the album includes collaborations with French, African, and American artists, including French rappers Booba (featured on "Kiname") and MHD (on "Na Lingui Yé"), Wizkid (on "Yakuza"), the duo KeBlack & Naza (on "Mannequin"), singers Shay (on "Guerrier") and Aya Nakamura (on "Bad Boy"), and R. Kelly (on "Nidja").

== Singles and promotion ==
=== Singles ===
The lead single, "Kiname" (a contraction of Kinshasa and Paname, the latter being an etymologically unclear reference to the city of Paris), premiered on 7 December, after being teased earlier on 23 November when Booba shared a brief preview of the instrumental on Instagram. Ipupa revealed the song's release date on 4 December 2016, three days in advance. As noted by Les Inrockuptibles, the song's music video blends ndombolo rhythms with French hip-hop, and shows the difference between Ipupa's upbeat, party-driven visuals and Booba's more serious street-oriented style. Wendy Mukoko of CELSA Sorbonne University accentuated that the video draws heavily on hip-hop culture through its visual codes, thematic content, and sonic palette, particularly the use of electronic instruments such as drum machines and vocoders. These features are interwoven with markers of Congolese rumba, including the prominence of electric guitar melodies, the centrality of dance, especially hip-oriented movements, and the partial use of Lingala. This fusion model appears across other tracks and made "Kiname" reach 10th place for best-selling singles in its first week, No. 1 on Topsify's Rap R&B playlist, and No. 1 on French iTunes within 24 hours. The "Kiname dance challenge" also gained traction on social media and was endorsed by celebrities, including Nigerian singer Davido, Cameroonian rapper Stanley Enow, and footballers Djibril Cissé and Alex Song. The song was certified gold by SNEP on 16 May 2017.

"Eloko Oyo" revisits "Visa Bomengo", a song popularized by the late fellow Mongo singer Mabelé Elissi, and is built on a traditional Mongo rhythm incorporating sebene alongside a contemporary international production. Its video foregrounds Congolese landscapes, heritage, and traditional clothing. Before being adapted in a studio version, the song already existed as a traditional Mongo piece. Ipupa faced accusations of plagiarism by Elissi's musicians, although these were denied by the late singer's widow, who stated that she had officially given Fally permission to re-record the song. "Eloko Oyo" quickly garnered over ten million YouTube views in a month. On 16 June, coinciding with the start of pre-orders for Tokooos, Ipupa unexpectedly released the ndombolo-infused Congolese rumba "Bad Boy", which featured Malian-French singer Aya Nakamura. The song samples a guitar riff performed by Simaro Lutumba in his 1982 hit "Faute ya Commerçant" with TPOK Jazz, and the video depicts Nakamura as a young woman distancing herself from a self-destructive "bad boy". It was certified gold on 3 November and platinum on 29 February 2024 by SNEP.

"Jeudi soir", which blends Congolese rumba with contemporary R&B, switches between French and Lingala and depicts the lifestyle of a party-oriented man. Released only as an audio track, it was criticized for departing from Congolese rumba. "Na Lingui Yé" sees Ipupa and MHD celebrate a woman's beauty over a fusion of contemporary R&B and Congolese rumba in Lingala and French, marking their second collaboration after Ipupa's appearance on MHD's eponymous debut album on the track "Ma vie". "Mannequin", featuring KeBlack and Naza, narrates a declaration of love and is accompanied by a Paris-set fashion-show video in which models parade in colorful, modest outfits while the artists sing and dance; cameo appearances by late DJ Arafat and Sidiki Diabaté appear, with commentators noting that KeBlack and Naza lean more toward Congolese rumba rhythms than conventional French rap flows. The mid-tempo R&B–infused Congolese rumba "Nidja", performed in English, French, and Lingala, explores interpersonal relationships and features R. Kelly, whose vocal delivery consists primarily of background vocal ad-libs echoing Ipupa's lines.

In the ndombolo "Tout le monde danse", Ipupa mainly sings in French, with brief passages in Lingala, supported by F'Victeam's backing vocals. The video was partly filmed at Fiesta Club in Kinshasa, where dancers from Dance's Warriors appear. Other parts were filmed at parties in Paris, including scenes at Daylight Studio, where Ipupa is seen dancing with others. The ndombolo-infused "Posa" is mainly sung in Lingala and talks about love and trying to win someone's heart. The video shows Ipupa sharing his feelings with his partner and ends with a dance scene. The romantic Congolese rumba "Juste une danse" also has a video centered on love and dancing. It shows Ipupa dancing with a woman and showing affection for her. The song gained widespread attention in Cameroon after being covered by Petit Fally, a young Cameroonian boy with a mental disability, whose performance in his village went viral and prompted emotional reactions from Cameroonian celebrities such as Samuel Eto'o, Maahlox le Vibeur, and YouTuber Steve Fah.

Tokooos also introduced new titles that Ipupa used to describe himself, including "King Arthur". In "Champ", which is stylistically reminiscent of his 2014 hit "Original", he portrays his competitors as inferior while introducing himself as the "King Hustler". Following his trip to Las Vegas for the Mayweather–McGregor boxing match, Ipupa, who was already known as the "Golden Child of Congo" and "Trois Fois Hustler", added another title by calling himself "The Greatest". On other songs, such as "Esengo", he talks about hard work, while "Boulé" was described by Ipupa as being like a national anthem. In "Guerrier", which features Shay and was initially titled "Bantou", Ipupa focuses on his culture and background. He told Booska-P that the song was meant to show his pride in being a Bantu king.

=== Promotion ===
On 26 November 2016, Ipupa was scheduled to perform at the Mirano Continental in Brussels as part of the album's promotion, but the concert was ultimately cancelled following a large-scale mobilization by the Combattants, a dissident movement opposed to then-Congolese president Joseph Kabila, as well as Congolese artists perceived to be aligned with his regime. Due to the scale of the mobilization, local authorities deployed riot police to maintain public order, and the movement later announced a ban on European stage performances by Congolese musicians accused of collaborating with the ruling elite. In 2017, Ipupa planned another concert at La Cigale in Paris for 22 June. However, the concert was annulled the preceding day by the Paris Police Prefecture, citing potential "serious disturbances to public order" instigated by the Combatants.

After Tokooos release, Ipupa pushed the promotion to the maximum by granting interviews to French medias like Le Monde, Paris Match, to channels France 24, Africa 24, TV5 Monde, BFM TV, and to radio channels Radio France Internationale, Africa Radio and to a few websites like OKLM.com. Skyrock, notably devotes a week to him on Planète Rap.

Thank you to all my warriors, and to all lovers of good music; thank you to the artists and composers who participated in this project; thank you to my teams, my label Elektra France, this is your golden record!

— Ipupa's statement after Tokooos received a gold certification from SNEP, 10 October 2022 (translated from French)

Two tours were organized for the album, collectively known as the Tokooos Tour, with approximately fifty concerts held in various international cities. The first leg commenced on 2 September 2017, in Lomé, Togo, and concluded on 19 February 2018 in Los Angeles, with concerts and showcases held in cities such as Nairobi, Lyon, Bordeaux, Frankfurt, Kinshasa, Brazzaville, Cotonou, Lusaka, Bamako, Cape Town, Johannesburg, Abidjan, and Luanda. He capped off 2017 by winning the title of "Best International Artist of the Year" in the Skyrock 2017 awards. The second leg was launched in March–August 2018 and featured a series of concerts and showcases in several countries, including Spain, France, Senegal, the Democratic Republic of the Congo, Norway, Italy, Burkina Faso, Cameroon, Zimbabwe, Zambia, and Botswana.

== Reception ==
=== Praise ===
Despite a strong urban influence, Ipupa maintains a strong connection to his roots and incorporates touches of Congolese rumba, as seen on tracks such as "Jeudi soir" and "Nidja", with other African influences evident across nearly the entire record. Africanews highlighted this balance, noting that the album shows musical diversity without abandoning Congolese rumba, and rather than aligning himself with contemporary Afropop trends, the outlet observed that he defines his approach as tokooos music. Booska-P praised the album as modern and credited Ipupa for making innovative African rhythms accessible to Western audiences by navigating between authenticity and urban soundscapes. Afropop Worldwide noted that, despite the achievements of earlier Congolese musicians, the European mainstream had long remained out of reach, with Papa Wemba coming closest through the world music circuit without fully crossing into pop mainstream success. By contrast, Tokooos helped establish Ipupa's presence in the European market, particularly in France, despite his already dominant status in francophone Africa.

=== Critique ===
Some critics said that Ipupa was becoming less connected to traditional Congolese rumba. Fellow Congolese rumba musician Papa Wemba had also criticized this change, saying that Ipupa had moved away from the basic style of the genre by giving it a more modern sound. Other critics also blamed him for allowing outside influences to affect the songs chosen for the album, arguing that Ipupa should have asked Warner Music France to include at least one traditional rumba track. However, songs such as "Posa", "Eloko Oyo", and "Champ" are entirely sung in Lingala.

Music scholar Wendy Mukoko of CELSA Sorbonne University noted that several songs strongly reference hip-hop culture through their visuals, themes, and sonic palette, particularly via electronic tools such as drum machines and vocoders. She accentuated that these elements are blended with key features of Congolese rumba, such as prominent electric guitar-driven lines, the central role of dance, especially hip-focused movements, and partial use of Lingala. Mukoko described this approach as a hybrid artistic "contract", a collaborative fusion model that has since influenced other Congolese artists aiming for Western audiences, notably Koffi Olomide, who later collaborated with Naza and KeBlack on "Pi Pi Pi".

== Track listing ==
Digital download / streaming
No.	Title	Writer(s)	Producer(s)	Length
1.	"Kiname" (featuring Booba)	Fally Ipupa; Elie Yaffa	Julio Masidi	3:02
2.	"Esengo"	Ipupa; Le Motif	Le Motif	3:21
3.	"Na Lingui Yé" (featuring MHD)	Ipupa; Mohamed Sylla	Julio Masidi	2:49
4.	"Yakuza" (featuring Wizkid)	Ipupa; Ayodeji Ibrahim Balogun	DSK On The Beat	3:31
5.	"Mannequin" (featuring Keblack & Naza)	Ipupa; Cédric Matéta Nkomi; Jean-Désiré Dzabatou; Youssoupha Mabiki	Julio Masidi	3:41
6.	"Tout le monde danse"	Ipupa; Glory; Nodj	Julio Masidi	2:30
7.	"Guerrier"	Ipupa; Vanessa Lesnicki; Le Motif	Le Motif	3:10
8.	"Siamois"	Ipupa	Le Motif	2:51
9.	"Posa"	Ipupa	Le Motif	3:25
10.	"Ca va aller"	Ipupa; Le Motif; Heezy Lee; Junior A la prod; Nixon Nizzy	Double X	3:23
11.	"Jeudi soir"	Ipupa; Le Motif	Le Motif	3:28
12.	"Bad Boy" (featuring Aya Nakamura)	Ipupa; Glory; Julio Masidi	Julio Masidi	3:02
13.	"Boulé"	Ipupa; Le Motif	Double X	3:05
14.	"Belle-fille"	Ipupa; Le Motif	Le Motif	3:35
15.	"Champ"	Ipupa	Ipupa	3:22
16.	"Nidja" (featuring R. Kelly)	Ipupa; Robert Kelly	Julio Masidi	4:25
17.	"Juste une danse"	Aysat	The Bionix	3:16
18.	"Eloko Oyo"	Mabele Elisi	Ipupa	4:46
Total length:				60:49

== Commercial performance ==
Tokooos debuted at number 28 on the SNEP Top Albums chart in July 2017, which was Ipupa's first entry on the French album charts, and later peaked at number 21 on Belgium's Ultratop Albums chart. In France, the album remained on the Top Albums 200 for 23 weeks, where it peaked at number 28. In July 2021, it was certified gold by SNEP after surpassing 50,000 equivalent streams sold, making Ipupa the first Kinshasa-based artist and the first solo performer from Central Africa to receive such a certification. The album also became the second release from Central Africa to earn a SNEP gold disc, following Racines by Bisso Na Bisso in 1999. Tokooos also became his first album to secure platinum certification from the Centre National de la Musique. It received a 6× diamond certification from Africa Music & Charts, making it the most certified album by a solo artist.

=== Charts ===
Chart (2017)	Peak position
Belgium (Flanders Ultratop)	110
Belgium (Wallonia Ultratop)	21
France (SNEP)	28

=== Certification ===
Region	Certification	Sales/Streams
France (SNEP); France (Centre National de la Musique); Africa (Africa Music & Charts)	Gold; Platinum; 6x diamond	Centre National de la Musique: 126,133

== Personnel ==
Credits adapted from the album's back cover:

- Fally Ipupa – composer, songwriter, lead and backing vocalist, arranger, executive producer
- Booba – featured vocals
- R. Kelly – featured vocals
- Shay – featured vocals
- MHD – featured vocals
- Aya Nakamura – featured vocals
- WizKid – featured vocals
- KeBlack – featured vocals
- Naza – featured vocals
- Youssoupha – songwriter
- Nodj – songwriter
- Heezy Lee – songwriter
- Nixon Nizzy – songwriter
- Aysat – songwriter
- Mabele Elisi – songwriter
- Glory Kabika – composer, songwriter
- Junior Alaprod – composer
- Julio Masidi – producer, recorder, composer, mixing, songwriter
- DSK On The Beat – composer
- BoussBouss – composer
- John Makabi – composer
- Guy-Hervé Imboua – composer
- Christian Dessart – composer
- Rachid Mir – composer
- Double X – composer, producer
- Le Motif – songwriter, producer
- The Bionix – producer, recorder
- Ismaël "Iso" Diop – guitar
- Auguy Solo – guitar
- High P – guitar
- Alex Gopher – mastering engineer
- Hi Stakes – mixing
- Jérémie Tuil – mixing
- Konex – mixing
- Lionel Capouillez – mixing
- Merco – mixing
- Ludovick Tartavel – mixing
- Laurie Galligani – recorder
- Philippe Delsart – recorder
- Benjamin Weber – mastering
- Warner Music France – distribution
- Studio 18 – recording studio
- Studios du Futur de l'Audiovisuel – recording studio
- Studio Feenix – recording studio
- Time Shift Studios – mixing studio
- Studio Jeremixing – mixing studio
- Studio Air – mixing studio
- Translab – mastering studio
- Universal Music Publishing France – publisher
- Warner Chappell Music Publishing – publisher
- Tallac Publishing – publisher
- Sékel Editons – publisher
- ARTSIDE – publisher
- Bomaye Publishing – publisher
- Nemesis Editions – publisher
- MMC – publisher
- Sony/ATV Music Publishing France – publisher
- Red Nations Music – publisher
- TopNotch – publisher
- Discipline Studio – graphic design, album cover
- Sarah Schlumberger – designer and photographer

== Release history ==
Region	Date	Version	Format	Label	Ref
Various	7 July 2017	Standard	CD; digital download; streaming	Elektra France and Warner Music France	
