= Power "Kosa Leka" =

Studio album by Fally Ipupa
- Released: 8 April 2013 (France); 5 April 2013 (DR Congo)
- Recorded: 2012–2013
- Studios: Studio Ndiaye (Kinshasa); Studio Grande Armée (Paris)
- Genres: Congolese rumba; ndombolo; hip-hop; R&B
- Labels: Obouo Music; Because Music
- Producers: David Monsoh; Fally Ipupa

Fally Ipupa chronology
| Arsenal De Belles Melodies (2009) | Power "Kosa Leka" (2013) | Tokooos (2017) |

Power "Kosa Leka" (Lingala for "lie and walk past") is the third studio album by Congolese singer-songwriter Fally Ipupa, released on 8 April 2013. The album contains 26 tracks and marks his final collaboration with producer David Monsoh. Power "Kosa Leka" is a blend of Congolese rumba, ndombolo, hip hop, and contemporary R&B, and was supported by singles "Emeraude", "1000% Mawa", "Anissa", "Skype", "Ndoki", "La vie est belle", "Amour Assassin", "Double Clic", "Kosa Leka", "Service", "Hustler Is Back", "Nourrisson", and "Stop à la Guerre". Though not as commercially dominant as his earlier releases, it sold 30,000 copies in its debut month.

On 14 May, Ipupa was awarded Best African Artist at the inaugural Trace Urban Music Awards.

== Background and release ==
Before the album's release, on 12 December 2012, he issued the first single "Sweet Life (La vie est belle)", which was initially meant for his forthcoming international album. However, the track was later excluded from that project and instead served as a prelude to Power "Kosa Leka". "Sweet Life (La vie est belle)" fuses Congolese rumba with elements of hip hop and R&B, giving it a more modern and widely appealing feel compared to the rest of the tracks, which leaned more toward traditional rumba and ndombolo, layered with keyboards and programmed rhythms that created a "perfectly smooth, syrupy atmosphere". The track is notable for its heavy use of mabanga, a common Congolese practice of mentioning or praising individuals within songs for payment. Being the album's shortest track, it contrasted with the others, which generally ran for about eight minutes. The song became a breakout success, with its music video surpassing two million YouTube views.

In February 2013, during an appearance on Trace Urban's Guest Star, Ipupa announced that Power "Kosa Leka" would include collaborations with artists from various backgrounds, including a song titled "Sex'plosif" featuring American rapper Eve. However, the track didn't make the final cut. The album was officially released in physical and digital formats simultaneously on 8 April 2013. The song "Ndoki", a fusion of Congolese rumba and hip-hop, rapidly attracted attention, with its video earning over 150,000 YouTube views within a week, while "Anissa" also drew significant attention online, surpassing 2.2 million views. In "Stop à la Guerre", Ipupa took on a more serious tone, addressing the ongoing Kivu conflict in eastern Congo. Although Power "Kosa Leka" didn't match the blockbuster sales of his earlier works, it sold 30,000 copies in its debut month. On 14 May 2013, at the inaugural Trace Urban Music Awards, Fally Ipupa was named the Best African Artist.

== Track listing ==
Volume 1

| No. | Title | Writer(s) | Length |
|---|---|---|---|
| 1. | "Hustler Is Back" | Fally Ipupa Nsimba | 8:06 |
| 2. | "Ndoki" | Ipupa | 6:26 |
| 3. | "Bruce" | Ipupa | 9:13 |
| 4. | "Emeraude" | Ipupa | 8:15 |
| 5. | "Anissa" | Ipupa | 7:17 |
| 6. | "Nourrisson" | Ipupa | 8:05 |
| 7. | "Kosa Leka" | Ipupa | 3:58 |
| 8. | "Cri d'Alarme" | Ipupa | 8:08 |
| 9. | "Mikitisa" | Ipupa | 8:32 |
| 10. | "Amour Assassin" | Ipupa | 6:56 |
| 11. | "Service" | Ipupa | 4:38 |
| 12. | "Sweet Life (La vie est belle)" | Ipupa | 3:26 |
| 13. | "Stop à la Guerre" | Ipupa | 4:19 |
| 14. | "Power 001 (short version)" | Ipupa | 5:31 |

Volume 2

| No. | Title | Writer(s) | Length |
|---|---|---|---|
| 1. | "Toi & Moi" | Ipupa | 9:01 |
| 2. | "Terminator" | Ipupa | 8:05 |
| 3. | "Double Clic" | Ipupa | 8:25 |
| 4. | "Pene Pene" | Ipupa | 8:16 |
| 5. | "Likukuma" | Ipupa | 7:32 |
| 6. | "Sony" | Ipupa | 7:31 |
| 7. | "Oxygène" | Ipupa | 7:36 |
| 8. | "We Are the World" | Ipupa | 6:50 |
| 9. | "1000% Mawa" | Ipupa | 6:48 |
| 10. | "Mungala" | Ipupa | 5:15 |
| 11. | "Mokek's" | Ipupa | 9:32 |
| 12. | "Skype" | Ipupa | 10:28 |
| 13. | "Power 001 (extended version)" | Ipupa | 13:48 |

== Personnel ==
Credits adapted from the album's back cover:

- Fally Ipupa – songwriter, lead and backing vocalist, arranger, guitarist, executive producer
- David Monsoh – executive producer
- Translab – mastering
- Studio Grand Armée – mixing studio
- J. Graphics – art direction
- Atele Kunianga, Batuseka Ping Pong, Cousto Lufuluabo (Mopiwi), Esalo Ambassy, Junior Mutukua, Masudi Dady, Mbula Maiko, Michel Lufua, Nathan Munkala, Pitchen Kalombo, Tony Buangi, Vobi Konde, Yusuf Mabiala – backing vocalists
- Ntoumba Minka, Wallo Liyeye – bassists
- Mamadou Coulibaly – creative director
- Alvarito Nkondi, Felly Tyson, Jobey Nsimba, Lepetit Kurukuru, Serge Liaki, Willy Zola – guitarists
- Billy Muyoyo, Mijo Mpuisani – keyboardists
- Alias LJ, Bruno Sourice, Nicolas Sacco – audio mixing
- Christian Ngongi, Lunguila Showman, Mata Suangolo – percussionists
- Enzo Van Erven – album cover photographer
- Jc Tshituka, Leny Bidens, Maïka Munan, Philippe Guez – programming
- Bagema Baby, Bampata Guelor, Ekofo Tramo, Identité Selenga, Kabuya, Luzolo Yannick, Mutamba Aime, Ntumba Gecamine – atalakus

== Release history ==
| Region | Date | Version | Format | Label | Ref |
|---|---|---|---|---|---|
| Various | 8 April 2013 | Standard | CD; digital download; streaming | Obouo Productions and Because Music | |
