= Droit Chemin =

Studio album by Fally Ipupa
- Released: 10 June 2006 (France)
- Recorded: 2005–2006
- Studio: Studio Grande Armée (Paris)
- Genres: Congolese rumba; ndombolo; R&B; pop
- Length: 79:30
- Label: Obouo Productions
- Producers: David Monsoh, Fally Ipupa and Maïka Munan

Fally Ipupa chronology
Droit Chemin (2006)	Arsenal De Belles Melodies (2008)

Droit Chemin (French for "straight path") is the debut solo studio album by Congolese singer-songwriter Fally Ipupa, released on 10 June 2006 by Obouo Productions. It was recorded while he was still a member of Koffi Olomide's band Quartier Latin International, and was produced by Ivorian music executive David Monsoh and includes guest appearances from Barbara Kanam, Maïka Munan, Krys, Mokobé, and Benji of Nèg' Marrons.

Droit Chemin blended Congolese rumba with elements of ndombolo, contemporary R&B, and pop music. The album sold more than 100,000 copies within its first month of release and reportedly topped Congolese music charts for nearly ten months. It was later certified platinum by Africa Music & Charts. The album has been identified as an influential release of the "fifth generation" of Congolese popular music, alongside Ferré Gola's Sens Interdit (2006) and Karmapa's Le temps de l'amour (2005), and helped establish Ipupa's solo career beyond his earlier work with Quartier Latin International.

== Background ==
Fally Ipupa began work on Droit Chemin while still a member of Koffi Olomide's Quartier Latin International, with which he had signed a seven-year contract. In 2005 December, the Congolese daily Le Potentiel reported that, with the support of Koffi, Ipupa had begun recording his debut album for release in 2006, while also contributing to the band's forthcoming album Danger de Mort. He became the second musician after drummer Titina Al Capone to be allowed to record a solo project while remaining an active band member, and he was the first singer to receive such permission. In 2006, he signed a recording contract with the Paris-based label Obouo Productions, founded by Ivorian producer David Monsoh and Barbara Kahan. Ipupa had first met Monsoh in 1998 while he was performing with the Kinshasa-based band Talent Latent. They later met again several times when Monsoh worked as executive producer on Koffi Olomidé's albums Effrakata (2001) and Affaire d'État (2003). During this period, Ipupa served as conductor of Quartier Latin International. In a 2014 interview with AbidjanTV.net, Monsoh stated that he had recommended Ipupa to Koffi "so he could learn alongside him because I knew I would have to produce him sooner or later".

== Composition and production ==
In 2005, during an interview at his Kinshasa residence with journalist Naty Lokolé, Ipupa announced that his debut solo studio album would be titled Droit Chemin. He explained that the decision to embark on a solo career stemmed from having already written and composed numerous songs, and from a conviction that the time had come to release a work entirely his own. Despite resistance from certain members of Quartier Latin International, Ipupa proceeded to record fifteen tracks under the direction of arranger-producer Maïka Munan, collaborating with select musicians from the band. These included vocalists Montana Kamenga and Modogo Abarambwa, atalaku Apocalypse Mobuka, guitarists Felly Tyson, Fofo Le Collégien, Ramazani Fulutini, Beniko Popolipo Zangilu, Binda Bass, and drummers Titina Alcapone and Champion Djikapela Esthétique. Twelve of the tracks were ultimately selected for the album. Additional contributors included musicians with prior experience working alongside Koffi, such as Munan himself, as well as artists from Ipupa's close circle, including Dédé Djasco, Serge Mabiala, and Michel Lumana. While still a member of Quartier Latin International, Ipupa simultaneously participated in the recording of Danger de Mort and contributed the song "Pharmacien".

Released on 10 June 2006 in Paris, Droit Chemin comprises twelve tracks plus a bonus song, "Mioleseke", which was included on the accompanying DVD due to the CD's 80-minute time limitation. The album features French rapper of Congolese descent Ben-J of Nèg' Marrons on "Sopeka", and Congolese singer Barbara Kanam on "100% Love". It was produced by Maïka Munan, distributed in the two Congos by Vision Music and Globe Music, and received radio airplay in Côte d'Ivoire before its official release. Distinct from many Congolese productions of its era, Droit Chemin blends multiple stylistic influences: its dance-oriented tracks, including "Droit Chemin" and "Bakandja", are influenced by ndombolo, while its slower-paced tracks, including "Liputa", "Attente", "Orgasy", and "Associé", draw on Congolese rumba, with the latter evoking the trumpet-laden arrangements characteristic of 1980s TPOK Jazz. The album also features mabanga, a practice in which musicians name or praise individuals in their songs in exchange for payment, most notably in "Associé", which includes a dedication to diamond dealer Empereur Tshatsho Mbala Kashoggi. Beyond these traditional influences, the album incorporates contemporary R&B and pop tempos, a rarity in Congolese popular music at the time, as heard in "Sopeka", "Mioleseke", "100% Love", and "Prince de Southfork". In an interview with Cameroon Tribune, Ipupa described the project as the "Fallynization of Congolese music".

== Promotion ==
The album's promotion became a source of tension with Koffi, who insisted that Ipupa prioritize Quartier Latin International's Danger de Mort over his solo work. Reports in the Congolese press suggested that their relationship deteriorated during this period, with speculation that Koffi considered revoking Ipupa's privileges within the band. Ipupa maintained publicly that he remained a full member of Quartier Latin International, though his increasing absences from the band's performances fueled rumors of an impending departure. On 15 September 2006, Le Phare reported that Ipupa and fellow member Ferré Gola had resigned from the band.

Ipupa promoted Droit Chemin at high-profile events in Kinshasa, including the launch of Thierry Michel's film Congo River, Beyond Darkness in December 2006 and the wedding celebration of Amédée Mwarabu Kiboko. On 6 February 2007, he performed selections from the album at a Celtel award ceremony in Kinshasa. For Valentine's Day 2007, he staged a special concert in the city center with tickets priced at $50. Droit Chemin's most prominent promotional event took place on 7 April 2007, when Ipupa headlined a sold-out concert at the Olympia in Paris, making him the first Congolese solo artist of his generation to perform there, following Tabu Ley Rochereau (1970), Abeti Masikini (1973), and Koffi (1998). The concert, promoted with the support of Radio France Internationale, featured guest appearances by Krys, Benji, and Lokua Kanza, and included both his Quartier Latin International repertoire, such as "Éternellement" and "Ko-Ko-Ko-Ko", and Droit Chemin tracks including "Naufra Ketch", "Cadenas", "Associé", and "Liputa".

== Reception ==
Droit Chemin was a commercial success and achieved gold certification for selling over 100,000 copies within its first month of release and maintaining the top position on the Congolese music charts for nearly ten months.

Critical reception was generally positive. South Africa's TVSA described the album as exploring the "trials and tribulations of love". John Nimis, an American scholar at New York University, explained that Droit Chemin uses strong imagery to express love and mainly tells stories about relationship struggles. In Le Point, Jean-Pierre Seck and Viviane Forson called the album a "revelation in the African musical landscape and beyond", noting that Ipupa's innovative approach and distinct artistic identity helped him stand out internationally. Jordache Diala of the Congolese daily La Prospérité remarked that Droit Chemin presented "a more charming, transformed, and lyrical Fally", with "languorous melodies" and "captivating love lyrics" that return to the roots of Congolese rumba. Critics singled out "Liputa", "Orgasy", and "Sopeka" for their fusion of traditional Congolese rumba with elements of ndombolo, contemporary R&B and pop music. Seck and Forson commended that this blend creates a "fresh and appealing sound" that appeals to many audience and positioned Ipupa as a bridge between Congolese rumba and modern music trends, similar to how Le Grand Kallé helped modernize Congolese music by connecting it with other Black music traditions.

Alongside Ferré Gola's Sens Interdit (2006) and Karmapa's Le temps de l'amour (2005), Droit Chemin was regarded as one of the defining works of the so-called "fifth generation" of Congolese popular music. The album's music videos helped popularized a controversial fashion trend in Kinshasa, originating from American hip-hop culture, in which trousers, shorts, or skirts were worn low to reveal underwear. Adopted by Ipupa's musicians and dancers, the style was quickly embraced by many young men and women in the city.

== Track listing ==
No.	Title	Writer(s)	Producer(s)	Length
1.	"Droit Chemin"	Fally Ipupa Nsimba	Maïka Munan	7:58
2.	"Liputa"	Ipupa	Munan	8:21
3.	"So.pe.ka" (featuring Benji)	Ipupa		7:53
4.	"Associé"	Ipupa	Munan	7:59
5.	"Mabelé"	Ipupa	Munan	6:17
6.	"Attente"	Ipupa	Munan	7:01
7.	"100% Love" (featuring Barbara Kanam)	Ipupa	Munan	3:21
8.	"Orgasy"	Ipupa	Munan	7:04
9.	"Bakandja"	Ipupa	Munan	7:01
10.	"Naufra Ketch"	Ipupa	Munan	6:04
11.	"Prince de Southfork" (Featuring Modogo Abarambwa)	Ipupa	Munan	5:28
12.	"Kidiamfuka"	Ipupa	Munan	4:59
Total length:				79:30

Bonus tracks on the bonus DVD
No.	Title	Writer(s)	Length
1.	"Molosieke"	Ipupa	4: 50
2.	"Droit Chemin Remix" (featuring Krys)	Pédro Pirbakas; Ipupa	3: 36
Total length:			84:20

== Personnel ==
Credits adapted from the album's back cover:

- Fally Ipupa – songwriter, lead and backing vocalist, arranger, executive producer
- Maïka Munan – arranger, executive producer
- David Monsoh – producer
- J. Graphics – design concept
- Alexandre Hasson, Charles Mendiant – audio engineers
- Joe Onzaya – management
- Lionel Nicod – mastering
- Ambroise Voundi, Edouard Meunier, Hervé Marignac – mixing
- Franck Adjbola – cover art photography
- Dédé Djasco, Luciana Demingongo, Modogo Balongana, Tripason, Montana Kamenga, Serge Mabiala – vocals
- Ben-J – songwriter, featured lead vocals
- Barbara Kanam – songwriter, featured backing vocals
- Jimmy Mvondo Mvele – tenor saxophone
- Maïka Munan, Binda Bass, Michel Bass – bassists
- Maïka Munan, Felly Tyson, Fofo Le Collégien, Ramazani Fulutini, Popolipo – guitarists
- Titina Al Capone, Djudjuchet Luvengoka – drummer
- Maïka Munan, Jimmy Mbonda, Jean-Marie Bolangassa – percussion
- Maïka Munan, Rubain Synthé, Brice Malonga – keyboardists
- Apocalypse Mobuka – atalaku
- Philippe Guez – programming
- Kabert Kabasele – trumpet
- Djudjuchet Luvengoka – accompaniment
- Ben – flute

== Certifications ==
Region	Certification	Certified units/sales
Africa (Africa Music & Charts)	Platinum	10,000

== Release history ==
Region	Date	Version	Format	Label	Ref
Various	10 June 2006	Standard	CD; digital download; streaming	Obouo Productions	
