= Sweet Life (La vie est belle) =

Single by Fally Ipupa

from the album Power "Kosa Leka"
- Released: 12 December 2012
- Recorded: 2012
- Genre: Congolese rumba; hip-hop
- Length: 3:26
- Label: Obouo Music; Because Music
- Songwriter: Fally Ipupa
- Producers: Fally Ipupa; David Monsoh

Fally Ipupa singles chronology
| "French Kiss" (2013) | "Sweet Life (La vie est belle)" (2013) | "Original" (2014) |

"Sweet Life (La vie est belle)" is a song by Congolese singer-songwriter Fally Ipupa, taken from his third studio album Power "Kosa Leka" (2013). It was released as the album's lead single on 12 December 2012 by Obouo Music and Because Music. The accompanying music video, directed by Charly Clodion, was filmed in France.

== Conception and release ==
"Sweet Life (La vie est belle)" was released on 12 December 2012 and was initially intended to feature on Fally Ipupa's upcoming international album. However, the song was eventually left off that project and instead introduced his album Power "Kosa Leka". The song blends Congolese rumba with contemporary R&B and hip-hop, giving it a more modern and widely appealing feel than the rest of the tracks, which leaned more toward traditional rumba and ndombolo, layered with keyboards and programmed rhythms. The song also heavily features mabanga, a Congolese custom of name-dropping individuals in exchange for payment. With a stuttering beat, slow-moving bass, and acoustic guitar, the track marks the first time Ipupa performs a rap verse himself. The vocals are laid over a Roland TR-808 drum machine, kick drums, and acoustic guitar, and the piece draws inspiration from Papa Wemba's "La Vie est Belle" from the film of the same name. As the shortest track on the album, contrasting with others that typically stretch to eight minutes, its lyrics are sung in Lingala, French, and English.

In the song, Ipupa portrays himself as a "hard worker" enjoying the rewards of a "sweet life". The track became a major hit, with its music video garnering over two million views on YouTube. In 2013, rumors circulated within the Congolese community claiming that Ipupa had taken the song from another songwriter without consent. That same year, an unidentified musician publicly alleged that he had written and shared the song with Ipupa, who later released it without acknowledgment. During an interview, the artist played a demo version of the track and requested compensation and recognition from Ipupa's team. Ipupa never responded to these allegations.

== Remixes ==
The official cover art for "Sweet Life (La vie est belle)" remix

On 29 May 2013, Congolese rapper Bigg Masta G (Muana Mboka) released the official remix of the song, which included two new rap verses over a slightly altered instrumental. Though created after the original version's release, this remix marked the first official collaboration between the two Congolese musicians, and it was also Ipupa's second team-up with an English-language artist, his first being "Chaise Electrique" with Olivia. The remix was produced in Germany by Bigg Masta G and J-JD Dacosta. Unlike the original, it doesn't open with an acoustic guitar; instead, it begins with a vocal sample of Bigg Masta G singing a cappella. The remix features two rap verses from Bigg Masta G and a chorus by Ipupa, all over a slightly modified instrumental.

The remix keeps the same lyrical themes as the original, focusing on the rewards of hard work and ambition. One line goes, "I meet the model chick, I don't even gotta take her...I just give her my number and tell her to holler later, I'm a hustler". In the song, Ipupa adopts the nickname "3X hustler" to reflect his commitment to success and nonstop hustle.

== Personnel ==
Song credits

- Fally Ipupa – writer, vocals, production

Remix credits

- Written by Fally Ipupa; Bigg Masta G (Muana Mboka)
- Fally Ipupa – vocals, production, instruments
- Bigg Masta G (Muana Mboka);– additional production, additional vocals, remixing
- J-JD Dacosta;– recording, mixing, mastering

Video credits

- Director – Charly Clodion
- Creative director – Charly Clodion
- Executive producer – Charly Clodion
