= Ndoki (song) =

Single by Fally Ipupa

from the album Power "Kosa Leka"
- Released: April 4, 2013
- Recorded: 2012; Because Music (France)
- Genre: Congolese Rumba; Hip hop
- Length: 6:26
- Label: 2013 Obouo Productions; Because Music
- Songwriter: Fally Ipupa
- Producers: Fally Ipupa; David Monsoh

Fally Ipupa singles chronology
"French Kiss" (2013)	"Ndoki" (2013)	"Original" (2014)

"Ndoki" is a song recorded by Congolese singer Fally Ipupa, from his third studio album Power "Kosa Leka" (2013). Ipupa released the single on YouTube, on April 4, 2013. It is the second single by Fally Ipupa to be remixed by rapper Bigg masta G (Muana Mboka).

== Conception and background ==
"Ndoki" was written and composed by Fally Ipupa and recorded and produced in France. The song's lyrics are about a woman who broke a man's heart by leaving him. He calls her "Ndoki" (Lingala for "Witch") for leaving him with heartache.

Ndoki eza kaka synonyme ya maseke na moto te = "Witch" is not only a synonym of having horns on ones head
Po na zamba ba niama mpe baza na yango na moto = Because some animals in the forest do have horns
Kasi ezali synonyme ya oyo azo lukela moninga liwa = But it is the synonym of someone who wants another to die
Ndoki ya vie na ngai eza yo, cherie = You are the witch of my life, sweetheart

"Ndoki" was included on Ipupa's third studio album Power "Kosa Leka" (2013), which was released on iTunes Store, YouTube and Google Play Music with no promotion having taken place.

== Remixes ==
On May 11, 2014, rapper Bigg masta G (Muana Mboka), released the official remix of "Ndoki". In exactly the same way as he released the "Sweet Life" remix, Bigg masta G did not promote for it beforehand. Meje30, Poison Mobutu and Mami Wata released a second remix.

== Personnel ==
Song credits

- Written by Fally Ipupa
- Fally Ipupa – vocals, production, vocal production

Remix 1 credits

- Written by Fally Ipupa; Bigg masta G (Muana Mboka)
- Fally Ipupa – vocals, production, vocal production, instruments
- Bigg masta G;– additional production, additional vocals, remixing
- Bigg masta G;– recording, mixing, mastering

Remix 2 credits

- Written by Fally Ipupa; Mami Wata; Meje 30; Poison Mobutu
- Mami Wata – – vocals
- Meje 30 – vocals
- Poison Mobutu – vocals

Video credits

- Director – Dandy

== See also ==
- Koffi Olomide
- Ferre Gola
- Mokobé
- Lynnsha
- Passi
- Youssoupha
