= Arsenal de Belles Melodies =

Arsenal de Belles Mélodies

Studio album by Fally Ipupa
- Released: 25 June 2009 (France)
- Recorded: 2007–2009
- Studios: Studio Ndiaye (Kinshasa); Studio Grande Armée (Paris)
- Genres: Congolese rumba; ndombolo; hip-hop; R&B
- Length: 118:26
- Labels: Obouo Music and Because Music
- Producers: David Monsoh, Fally Ipupa, and Maïka Munan

Fally Ipupa chronology
Droit Chemin (2006)	Arsenal de Belles Mélodies (2009)	Power "Kosa Leka" (2013)

Arsenal de Belles Mélodies (French for "arsenal of beautiful melodies", abbreviated as ADBM or Arsenal 2BM) is the second solo studio album by Congolese singer-songwriter Fally Ipupa, released on 25 June 2009 through Obouo Productions and Because Music. Produced by David Monsoh, the 16-track album blends Congolese rumba and ndombolo with hip-hop and contemporary R&B, and features guest appearances by American R&B singer Olivia Longott on "Chaise Électrique" and Guadeloupean reggae-dancehall artist Krys on "Sexy Dance". The album was developed over three years following the success of Ipupa's debut Droit Chemin (2006) and was supported by an extensive promotional campaign that included performances across Africa, Europe, and the United States.

Commercially successful, Arsenal de Belles Mélodies sold 40,000 copies within its first week, achieved gold certification in less than a month, and went on to sell nearly 500,000 copies in France. It topped the Congolese music charts, reached number eight on RFI Musique's 2009 "Top World Music Albums" list, and remained in the iTunes Top 100 World Music Albums chart more than a decade after its release. The album received critical acclaim for its innovative fusion of genres, with particular praise for "Chaise Électrique", which was seen as a breakthrough in expanding Congolese popular music's global reach.

== Background and production ==
Preparations for Arsenal de Belles Mélodies began as early as April 2008, when Cameroon Tribune reported that Fally Ipupa was working on his second solo studio album during a planned tour in Cameroon. By March 2009, Radio Okapi noted that Ipupa had returned from an extensive tour across Europe, the United States, and Africa, and announced plans to perform at the Zénith in Paris following the album's release, which was to be handled by a major European distributor. On 12 June 2009, during his appearance at the inaugural edition of La Nuit des Icônes ("The Night of Icons") at the Saint John's Plaza in Douala, Cameroon, Ipupa previewed an exceptional piece from the album to an enthusiastic audience.

Speaking to Cameroon Tribune, he revealed that the project had been three years in the making and was envisioned as a double album comprising 16 tracks "full of beautiful melodies", with a worldwide release initially slated for 22 June 2009. Ipupa described the work as a continuation of his musical style established in his debut solo studio album Droit Chemin, remarking, "the Fallynization continues". Although the original concept included 20 tracks and four collaborations, the final version retained 16 songs, including two guest appearances: American R&B singer Olivia on "Chaise Électrique" and Guadeloupean reggae-dancehall artist Krys on "Sexy Dance". The collaboration with Krys had initially been intended for the latter's album Step Out, but label arrangements led to its inclusion on both projects. Ipupa described his meeting with Olivia as a "natural" encounter during a tour, noting that the two connected immediately and that their managers encouraged a collaboration. He characterized the partnership as a "cultural exchange" designed to promote African music to U.S. audiences while introducing Olivia's artistry to African audiences.

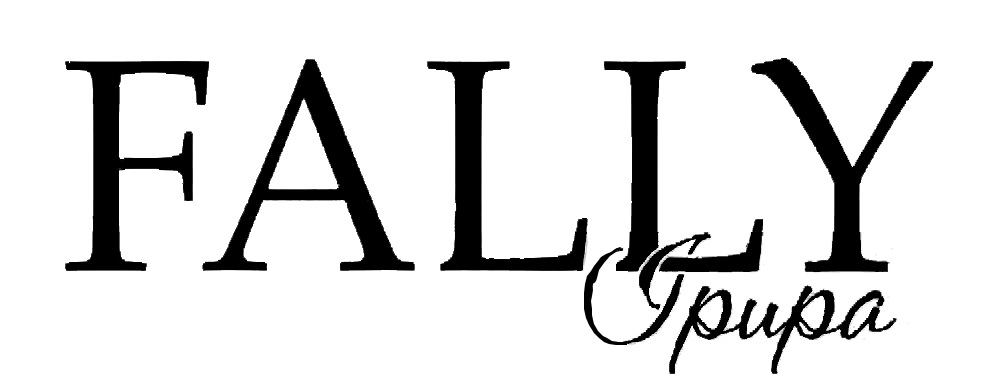
Ipupa's 2009 logo was a key visual element on the covers of both Arsenal de Belles Mélodies and Power "Kosa Leka".

The release of Arsenal de Belles Mélodies was later postponed, with the Congolese daily La Prospérité reporting on 18 June that the launch had been deferred to late July. The album eventually saw its official release on 25 June 2009 under Obouo Productions, with worldwide distribution by Because Music and local distribution in the Democratic Republic of the Congo by Vision Music. Ipupa worked closely with arranger Maïka Munan, who contributed compositions and oversaw arrangements, while production duties were shared between them. Several tracks drew attention for lyrics that some perceived as suggestive or explicit; however, the National Commission for the Censorship of Songs and Performances cleared the work for release after reviewing its songs and accompanying music videos. The lead single, "Bicarbonate", was issued in two formats: a locally tailored version and a shorter, dedication-free remix adapted for international television. Ipupa explained that, while Congolese rumba compositions typically extend beyond seven minutes, such adaptations were necessary to meet Western broadcasting standards.

== Promotion ==
On 11 August 2009, Ipupa appeared at the 40th edition of the Kinshasa International Fair (Foire Internationale de Kinshasa, FIKIN), one of the city's main annual events.

In October 2009, his promotional efforts were affected by a disagreement with Bracongo, which sponsored him at the time. The dispute started during a VIP show at the "Sai-Sai" venue in Ngaliema's Binza–U.P.N. quartier (quarter). The venue had been decorated with Heineken promotional material, even though the brand belongs to Bralima, which was a direct competitor of Bracongo. Because of his agreement with Bracongo, Ipupa asked for the Heineken branding to be covered before going on stage. Although the request was carried out, a Bracongo representative later confronted him publicly and accused him of not respecting the contract. The situation became tense, and one of Ipupa's bodyguards removed the representative from the venue. After the incident, Ipupa demanded a formal apology and financial compensation. The Congolese French-language newspaper La Prospérité reported that he also considered ending his partnership with Bracongo.

In November 2009, Ipupa headlined the inaugural Festival International 100 % Rumba in Abidjan, Côte d'Ivoire, which was held on 6–7 November to celebrate Congolese rumba. A major promotional milestone was his concert at the Zénith in Paris on 2 January 2010, which marked his debut there as a solo artist with his band F'Victeam. Initially scheduled for 2 September 2009, the performance included several tracks from Arsenal de Belles Mélodies, such as "Travelling Love", "Une Minute", "Nyokalessé", "Chaise Électrique", "Sexy Dance", and "Cadenas". He was joined on stage by Olivia, Malian-French rapper Mokobé, and Krys. Other promotional appearances included performances in Germany and at the Accor Arena in Paris in July 2010.

== Reception ==
Arsenal de Belles Mélodies was a commercial and critical success. In its first month, the album sold about 40,000 copies and received gold certification. It went on to sell nearly 500,000 copies in France. In the Democratic Republic of the Congo, the album entered the national charts at No. 1, ahead of Tshala Muana's Sikila, as well as reaching No. 8 on RFI Musique's 2009 list of the Top 10 World Music Albums, a ranking described as the musical equivalent of an "all-star team" that recognizes artists whose work has made a notable cultural impact. More than ten years after its release, in 2021, Strong2Kin Moov reported that the album was still listed in the iTunes Top 100 World Music Albums chart.

Critically, the album was praised for its stylistic fusion. The EastAfrican accentuated Ipupa's innovative blend of Congolese rumba, ndombolo, hip-hop, and contemporary R&B, noting that the bilingual love song "Chaise Électrique", a duet with former G-Unit R&B singer Olivia, generated attention and helped introduce him to a global audience. South Africa's TVSA credited Arsenal de Belles Mélodies' success to a combination of romantic ballads such as "Travelling Love", "Tshô", "Une Minute", and "Cadenas", alongside club-oriented tracks like "Bicarbonate" and "Sexy Dance", whose ndombolo roots made them popular in Congolese nightlife. Strong2Kin Moov lauded the album as "a perfect counterpoint" and "the Holy Grail" of Ipupa's discography.

=== Accolades ===
At the 2010 Ndule Awards, Arsenal de Belles Mélodies won Best Album, Best Video for "Chaise Électrique", and Best Song for "Délibération". The music video for "Sexy Dance" earned the award for Best Video at the 2010 MTV Africa Music Awards. "Sexy Dance" was also named Most Popular Song of the Year and Central African Song of the Year at the 2011 Museke Online African Music Awards.

== Track listing ==
No.	Title	Writer(s)	Producer(s)	Length
1.	"Bicarbonate"	Fally Ipupa Nsimba	David Monsoh	9:27
2.	"Cadenas"	Ipupa	David Monsoh	8:22
3.	"Tshô"	Ipupa	David Monsoh	6:27
4.	"Travelling Love"	Ipupa	David Monsoh	8:21
5.	"Une Minute"	Ipupa	David Monsoh	7:23
6.	"Délibération"	Ipupa	David Monsoh	7:02
7.	"Chaise Électrique" (featuring Olivia)	Ipupa; Olivia Theresa Longott	David Monsoh	7:02
8.	"Nyokalessé"	Ipupa	David Monsoh	7:52
9.	"Mon Amour"	Ipupa	David Monsoh	6:13
10.	"Catafalque"	Ipupa	David Monsoh	8:01
11.	"La Jungle"	Ipupa	David Monsoh	5:46
12.	"Arsenal De Belles Mélodies"	Ipupa	David Monsoh	9:38
13.	"5è Race"	Ipupa	David Monsoh	8:02
14.	"Orphelin Amoureux"	Ipupa	David Monsoh	5:07
15.	"Lourdes"	Ipupa	David Monsoh	8:44
16.	"Sexy Dance" (featuring Krys)	Pédro Pirbakas; Ipupa	David Monsoh	3:21
Total length:				118:26

== Personnel ==
Credits adapted from the album's back cover:

- Fally Ipupa – songwriter, lead and backing vocalist, arranger, executive producer
- Maïka Munan – electric guitar, acoustic guitar, programming, executive producer, and arranger
- David Monsoh – executive producer
- Pédro "Krys" Pirbakas – featured vocals
- Olivia Theresa Longott – featured vocals
- Alexis Fouin, Antoine Biser, Guillaume Lejault, JP Kyss Kyungu Ngoy – audio engineers
- Alvarito Nkondi, Jobey Nsimba, Lepetit Kurukuru, Serge Liaki – guitarists
- J. Graphics – art direction
- Coggi Bass, Étienne Mbappé, Guy Nsangué, Michel Bass, Pati Kaja Bass – bassists
- Mamadou Coulibaly – creative director
- Champion Esthétique Muanza, Simolo Katondi – drummers
- Fofo Le Collégien, Popolipo, Ramazani Fulutini – electric guitar
- Billy Muyoyo, Brice Malonga, Mijo Mpuisani – keyboardists
- Ambroise Voundi, Hervé Marignac, Nicolas Stawski – audio mixing
- Jean-Marie Bolangassa, Jimmy Mbonda – percussion
- Peter – cover art photography
- Akeraïm, Philippe Guez, Souzy Kasseya – programming
- Bampata Guelor, Dubaï, Equaliseur Boseko, Kabuya, Ntumba Gecamine – atalakus
- Atele Kunianga, Erick Kalala, Junior Elias, Junior Mutukua, Masudi Dady, Michel Lufua, Mopiwi, Pitchen Kalombo, Pitchou Luzolo, Ronsard Kanza, Tony Buangi, Vobi Konde – backing vocals

== Release history ==
Region	Date	Version	Format	Label	Ref
Various	25 June 2009	Standard	CD; digital download; streaming	Obouo Productions and Because Music	
