= Ndoki =

Ndoki may refer to:

- Ndoki tribe — Tribe of Igbo people in Nigeria
- Nouabalé-Ndoki National Park
- Dzanga-Ndoki National Park
- "Ndoki" (song), by Fally Ipupa
