= Fally Ipupa =

Congolese singer (born 1977)

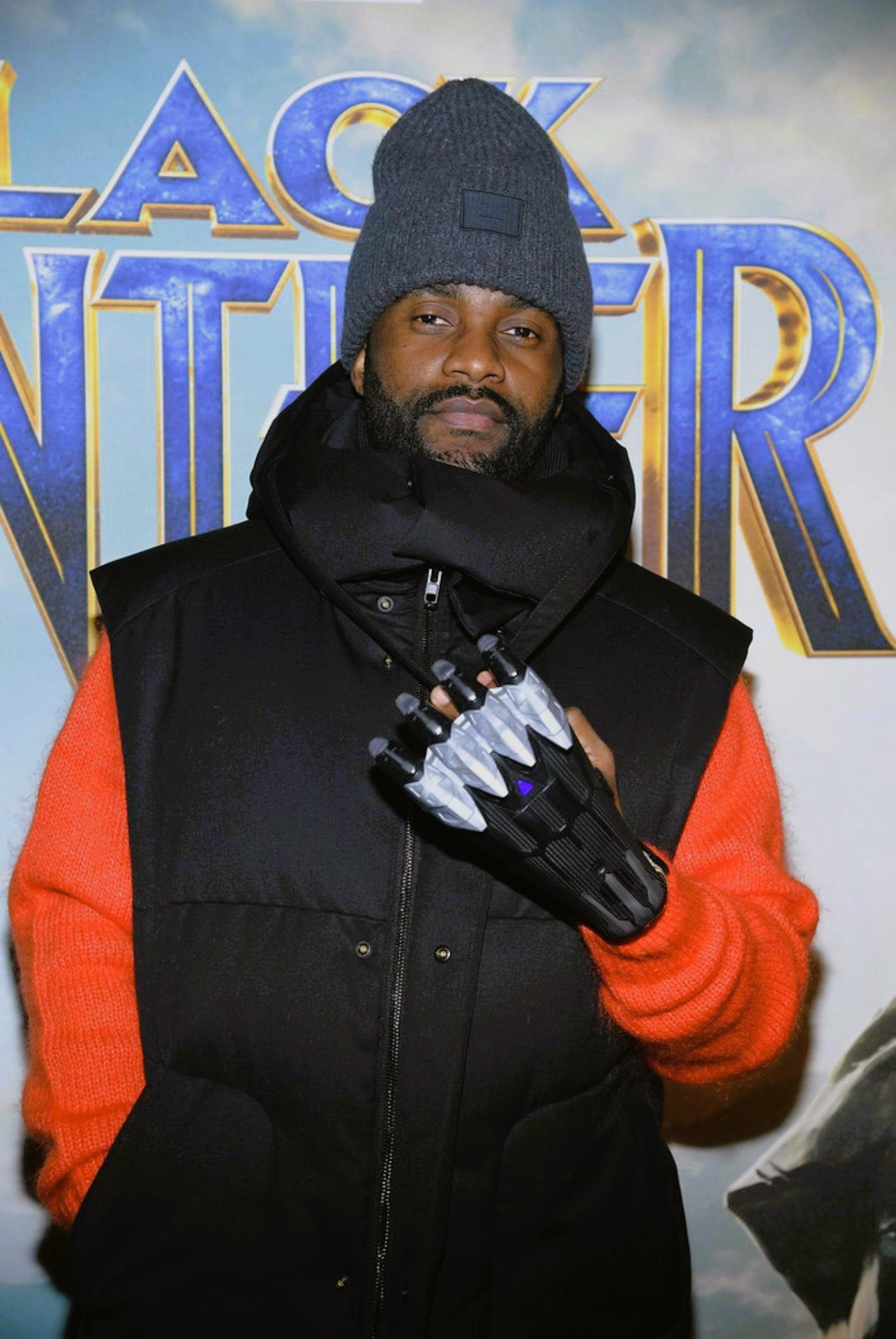
- Fally Ipupa in 2018

Background information
- Born: Fally Ipupa Nsimba; 14 December 1977 (age 48); Kinshasa, Zaire (modern-day Democratic Republic of the Congo)
- Genres: Congolese rumba; ndombolo; soukous; R&B
- Occupations: Musician; dancer; singer; record executive
- Instruments: Vocals; guitar
- Years active: 1997–present
- Labels: Obouo Music; Because Music; AZ; Capitol France; Elektra France
- Formerly of: Talent Latent; Quartier Latin International
- Website: fally-ipupa.com
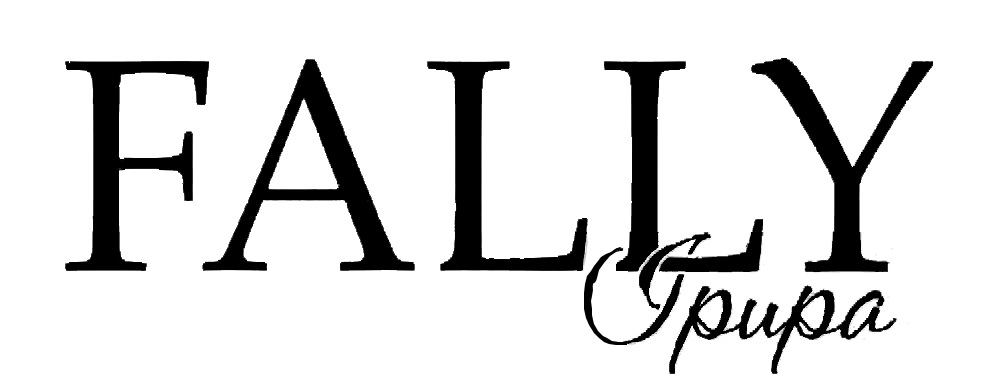

Fally Ipupa Nsimba (born 14 December 1977) is a Congolese musician and dancer. Often referred to as the "Prince of Rumba", he is known for his tenor vocals and his fusion of contemporary and traditional Congolese music genres, including Congolese rumba, soukous, and ndombolo. His lyrics often explore themes of romance, suffering, and joy.

Born to a Mongo family in Kinshasa, Ipupa made his public musical debut in 1997, at the age of 19, with the Kinshasa-based band Talent Latent. In 1999, he joined Koffi Olomide's Quartier Latin International, and in 2006, he signed a record deal with Obouo Productions for his debut solo studio album, Droit Chemin, which sold over 100,000 copies within a month. In 2007, he won the Césaire de la Musique prize for Best Male Performer. In April 2008, Ipupa won the Best Central African Artist at Kundé, and by May 2009, he ranked as the fifth most searched public figure on Yahoo France, before releasing his second studio album, Arsenal de Belles Mélodies, on 25 June of that year, which featured hits such as "Chaise Électrique" (featuring Olivia) and "Sexy Dance" (featuring Krys), which became some of his signature songs. The album quickly sold over 500,000 copies in France. Ipupa subsequently won two consecutive 2010 MTV Africa Music Awards for Best Francophone Artist and Best Video for "Sexy Dance". His third studio album, Power "Kosa Leka", spawned the hits "La vie est belle", "Ndoki", and "Service".

In 2013, Ipupa won the Trace Urban Music Award for Best African Artist and was signed to the French record label AZ by Julien Creuzard. Following Creuzard's departure from AZ to establish Elektra France in May 2016, Ipupa joined the new label. His fourth studio album, Tokooos, yielded his highest commercial success and was certified gold by SNEP, making him one of the first Kinshasa-based Congolese solo artists to achieve that honor. Tokooos was also certified platinum by the Centre National de la Musique and sextuple diamond by Africa Music & Charts. His fifth studio album, Control, followed in November 2018 and was certified quadruple diamond by Africa Music & Charts. Tokooos II followed in December 2020 and received the same quadruple diamond certification His seventh studio album, Formule 7, was released in December 2022 and received platinum certification from the Centre National de la Musique as well as 3× diamond certification from Africa Music & Charts. His eighth studio album, XX, was released as a two-part project, with the first installment, also titled XX, issued on 17 April 2026, followed by the second installment, XX : Délirium, on 18 September. The first installment topped the SNEP Top Albums chart, making Ipupa the first African artist to achieve the feat.

In 2014, Forbes ranked Ipupa as the sixth richest African musician, and Jeune Afrique named him one of the fifty most influential African artists in 2018. He is the most-streamed French-speaking artist on Boomplay and the most-followed Congolese artist on Facebook, Instagram, and YouTube. In July 2025, he topped Billboard France's ranking of the most-streamed Congolese artists whose careers originated in either the DRC or the Republic of the Congo. Ipupa is also known for his humanitarian work: he is the founder of the Fally Ipupa Foundation, which provides aid to marginalized groups in the Democratic Republic of the Congo, including victims of sexual violence and disease, as well as orphans.

== Early life and career ==
=== 1977–1996: Early life and music debut ===
Fally Ipupa was born Fally Ipupa Nsimba to Mongo parents on 14 December 1977, in Kinshasa, Zaire (now the Democratic Republic of Congo), to Monique Bolutuli Mbo and Faustin Ebombo Ipupa. He has a brother and two sisters. Ipupa grew up in the Bandalungwa commune, surrounded by nightclubs, bars, and the headquarters of Wenge Musica, which ignited his interest in music. He was particularly drawn to drums and also sang in a Catholic church with his mother. He recounted to Le Point: "I played congas, tried a bit of guitar, my sister dabbled in gospel, my late mother sang in church, my father liked to listen to music". He later performed music in the streets with improvised instruments, along with his friends Atele Kunianga, Pitshou Luzolo, and Sankara de Kunta. Although his parents hoped for him to pursue a medical career given his aptitude for science, Ipupa remained committed to music. He collaborated with various orchestras and groups, such as Flash Succes, Fraternité Musica, New City de la Bogania, and Kibinda Nkoy, ultimately contributing to the formation of Nouvelle Alliance. He gained a reputation as a singer, dancer, and atalaku, and his proficiency developed as he gained experience with conventional instruments.

=== 1997–1998: Talent Latent ===
In 1997, Ipupa joined Talent Latent, a music group formed by Mosain Malanda and Faustin Djata, the latter being a former production manager and later administrative director of Quartier Latin International. He served as the band's conductor. Opting to abandon formal schooling to fully commit to his musical aspirations, he was accompanied by his childhood friends Atele Kunianga and Pitshou Luzolo as well as the atalakus Lisimo Gentamicine and Cellulaire Yankobo. The band released their debut album, A l'oeuvre on connait l'artiste, in January 1999. It gained national recognition and made a few appearances on the Congolese national television channel RTNC, where Ipupa performed the song "Courte joie". While A l'oeuvre on connait l'artiste received some recognition, Ipupa began working on the band's second studio album but faced a significant setback as several key members left to establish the group Quartier Latin Académia in Paris, leading to Talent Latent's gradual dissolution.

Djata, a staff member in Koffi Olomidé's ensemble, introduced Ipupa to Olomidé, who invited him to join his orchestra, earning Ipupa the sobriquet "Anelka" as the "most expensive transfer", an allusion to the high-profile transfer of Nicolas Anelka to Real Madrid.

== Quartier Latin International: 1999–2006 ==
Ipupa joined Quartier Latin International in May 1999. During his audition, he sang and danced, leading to his integration into the group as a songwriter, composer, and band conductor. The same year, he also contributed to Koffi Olomidé's solo album Attentat, recorded in South Africa, where his voice featured on such songs as "Victoire", "Caméléon", "Malanda-Ngombé", "Number One", "Nul n'est parfait", and "Kamutshima".

Ipupa included his composition "Éternellement" to Quartier Latin International's 2000 fifth studio album, Force de Frappe. He also collaborated with Koffi Olomidé on his 2001 album, Effrakata, including on the track "Effervescent". In 2003, he contributed a song to Quartier Latin International's double album Affaire d'Etat. In 2004, Koffi Olomidé released the album Monde Arabe, which also featured vocals by Ipupa. In a 2009 interview with Radio France Internationale, referring to Koffi Olomidé, Ipupa stated, "At his side, I learned a lot. He is a professional musician artist, very serious in his work. With him, we worked like crazy".

Ipupa left Quartier Latin International in 2006, but in 2016, he took part in a project commemorating the band's 30th anniversary.

== Solo career ==
=== 2006–2008: Debut solo album ===
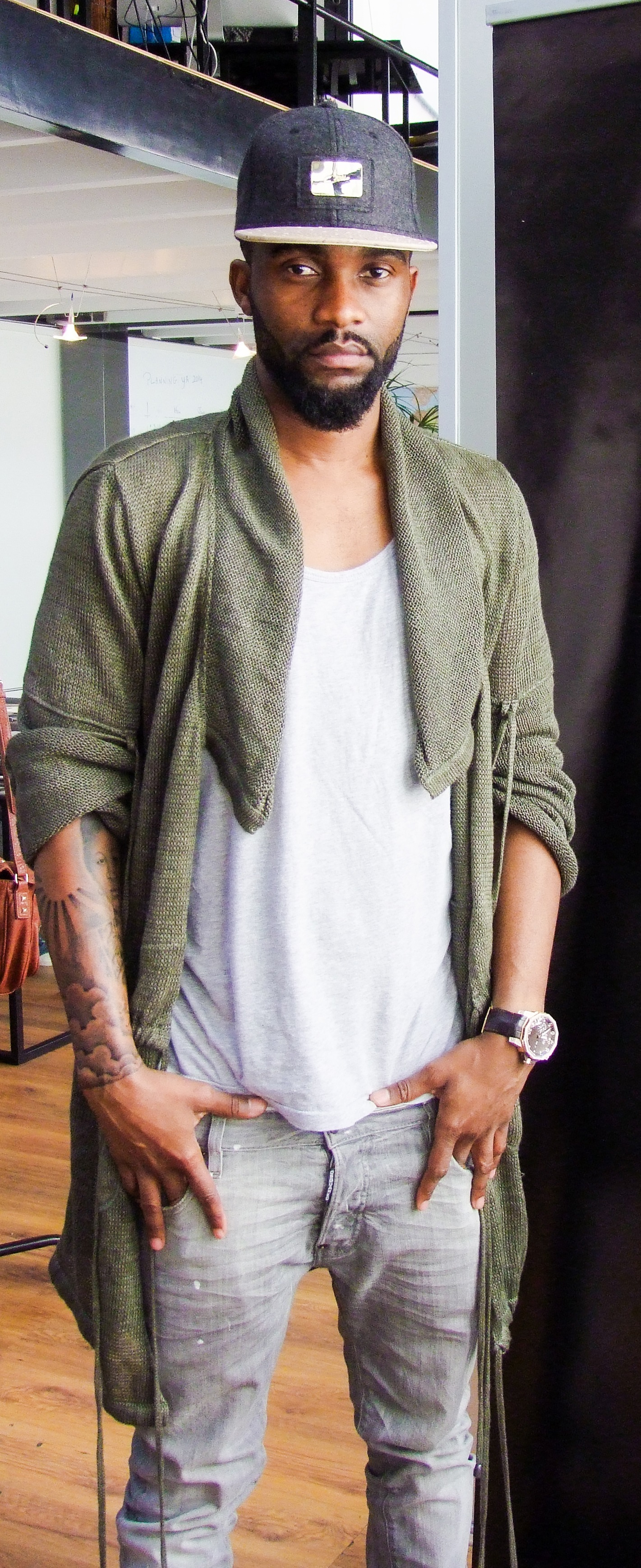
Ipupa in 2014

While still with Quartier Latin, Ipupa signed a record deal with Obouo Productions in 2006 for a solo album, titled Droit Chemin. In an interview with Radio France Internationale, he credited his development as a songwriter and composer to his time under Koffi's mentorship, who, he noted, provided essential guidance on crafting song openings and structuring musical arrangements. Ipupa became only the second Quartier Latin member, after drummer Titina Al Capone, to record a solo project while remaining in the band, and the first singer to receive such permission. Despite numerous attempts to dissuade him from going solo, including by fellow Quartier Latin musicians, Ipupa entered the studio alongside select Quartier Latin musicians and the arranger Maïka Munan and recorded fifteen songs, twelve of which were selected for the album. At the same time, Ipupa worked on Quartier Latin's next record, Danger de Mort. His solo album was released on 10 June 2006 and included collaborations with Barbara Kanam, Maïka Munan, Krys, Mokobé, and Benji. Droit Chemin received positive reviews and sold over 100,000 copies within a month. South Africa's TVSA described the album as "trials and tribulations of love". Buoyed by the album's success, Ipupa left Quartier Latin shortly after. In a 2017 interview with Radio Vibe Côte d'Ivoire, Ipupa attributed his departure in part to what he described as Koffi's difficult temperament and treatment of its members. He recalled, "When I was with the group, he was a mean man. He ruled us like a general, just like his nickname, The General". After Ipupa's departure, Koffi reportedly tried unsuccessfully to bring him back.

On 7 April 2007, Ipupa sold out the Olympia Hall in Paris, becoming the first Congolese solo artist to do so since Tabu Ley Rochereau in 1970, Abeti Masikini in 1973, and Koffi Olomide in 1998. He was joined onstage by artists like Krys, Benji, and Lokua Kanza. Louise Colcombet, writing for Le Parisien, likened the concert to a messianic arrival and extolled Ipupa as "the rising star of Zairean music". The performance was recorded and released as a DVD, titled Live a L'Olympia.

On 13 July, he joined the Rythmes Africains event, jointly organized by Radio France Internationale, the Paris City Hall, and the International Organization of La Francophonie, hosted at the Place de la Bastille, with other prominent African musical artists. After his European tour, he performed at the Culture Palace of Abidjan in Ivory Coast, and later returned to Paris for a performance at the Casino de Paris, where he was honored as the Best Male Performer at the Césaire de la Musique awards on 22 October. On 27 October, he participated in an international music festival titled 1st Movicel Live Fest at the Estádio da Cidadela in Luanda, Angola. To round off the year, he won Best African Artist at the Pan-African Music Festival Black Music Awards in Benin.

In 2008, he held a series of concerts in France, Belgium, Germany, the United States, and Cameroon. His increasing recognition in Africa was also acknowledged in Burkina Faso, where he won the Best Central African Artist at Kundé on 25 April.

=== 2009–2012: Arsenal de Belles Melodies, "Hands Across the World" ===
Ipupa began working on his second studio album, Arsenal de Belles Melodies, in early 2008. In May 2009, he performed to a crowd of 90,000 people at the Creole Night event hosted at Stade de France in Paris by Kassav', to celebrate their 30th anniversary. Arsenal de Belles Melodies was released in June 2009, three years after Droit Chemin. Consisting of 16 tracks and co-produced by Obouo Productions and Because Music, the album featured American singer Olivia on the single "Chaise Électrique", as well as dancehall artist Krys on "Sexy Dance". Arsenal de Belles Melodies sold over 100,000 copies, including 40,000 in just one week. That same year, Ipupa won the Trophées des Arts Afro-Caribéens as well as a gold record. He went on to perform at the Zenith de Paris on 2 January 2010. To further support his album, Ipupa delivered a performance in Germany, followed by a concert at the Accor Arena in Paris in July. He subsequently performed in Belgium, Switzerland, and the US. Other concerts were called off due to threats emanating from the Combattants, a dissident faction critical of then-Congolese president Joseph Kabila, and Congolese artists who were aligned with him. Arsenal de Belles Melodies won three Ndule Awards in Kinshasa, including Best Album of the Year, Best Music Video, and Best Song.

On 10 November, Ipupa was featured on "Hands Across the World", a song composed and produced by American singer R. Kelly. The track served as the debut release by the African supergroup One 8, whose members included Ipupa, Amani, Ali Kiba, Navio, 2face Idibia, JK, 4x4, and Movaizhaleine. On 14 December, Ipupa won two consecutive MTV Africa Music Awards for Best Video for "Sexy Dance" and Best Francophone Artist.

He was slated to perform again at the Zénith de Paris on 1 January 2011, but the concert was postponed to 12 March 2011, due to challenges in obtaining a travel visa. Le Potentiel reported that Maison Schengen, a visa consultancy agency, had denied European visas to multiple artists based in Kinshasa. The verdict sparked public reactions, with demonstrators protesting in front of the DRC's Ministry of the Interior and Security. Despite the visa challenges, Ipupa sold out the venue, earned a nomination for Best International African Artist at the BET Awards, headlined the Sawa Sawa Festival in Nairobi on 28 May, and achieved another sold-out performance on 11 June at the Stade de France during Nuit Africaine, performing alongside other African artists like Werrason, Jessy Matador, Patience Dabany, Coumba Gawlo, Oumou Sangaré, Sekouba Bambino, Petit Pays, Meiway, Magic System, Passi, Mokobé, Baaba Maal, Alpha Blondy, Manu Dibango, and Mory Kanté. Later that summer, he performed two consecutive sold-out concerts in Cameroon, at Douala Bercy on 22 July and Yaoundé Multipurpose Sports Complex on 23 July, with proceeds supporting HIV/AIDS initiatives. In September 2011, Ipupa won four Afrotainment Museke Online Music Awards and two Okapi Awards. On 27 December, he performed at the Culture Palace of Abidjan with special guests Olivia, J. Martins, and DJ Arafat.

=== 2013: Power "Kosa Leka" and "Kitoko" ===
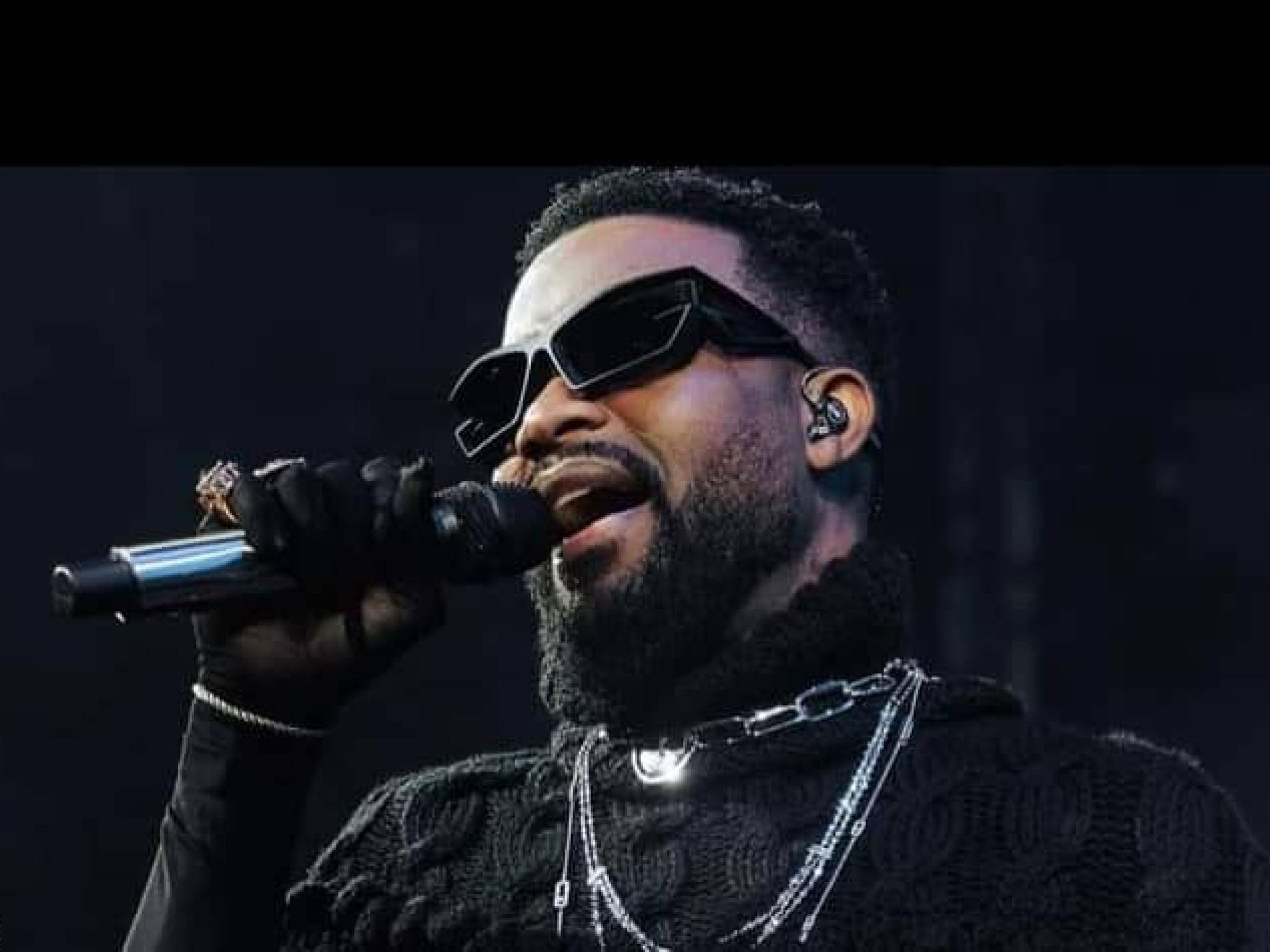
Ipupa performing in Paris

In February 2013, Ipupa revealed on Trace Urban's show Guest Star that his third studio album, Power "Kosa Leka", would feature "different nationalities" as well as a track titled "Sex'plosif" with American rapper Eve. The record, released on 8 April 2013, was a blend of Congolese rumba, ndombolo, and hip hop. Critic Claudy Siar, reviewing the album for RFI, called it "one of the best productions on the Afro musical planet". However, shortly after its debut, "Sex'plosif" was not included in the tracklist. Jointly produced by Obouo Productions and Because Music, Power "Kosa Leka" was supported by "Emeraude", "1000% Mawa", "Anissa", "Skype", "Ndoki", "La vie est belle", "Amour Assassin", "Double Clic", "Kosa Leka", "Service", "Hustler Is Back", "Nourrisson", and "Stop à la Guerre". To promote the album, Ipupa embarked on a Pan-African tour, with live shows in Ivory Coast, Angola, Cameroon, Gabon, the DRC, the Republic of the Congo, as well as the UAE.

On 11 April, a week after the album's debut, Ipupa was signed by Julien Creuzard to the AZ label, a subsidiary of Universal Music Group, for the production of three international albums. On 14 May 2013, he won the Trace Urban Music Awards for Best African Artist. On 18 May 2013, he performed at the MTV Africa All Stars concert at the Moses Mabhida Stadium in Durban, South Africa, alongside Snoop Dogg, 2Face Idibia, and Flavour. On 23 June, Ipupa released the single "Kitoko", featuring Youssoupha, followed by a music video in September. The track was initially slated for inclusion on the international album but was ultimately released as a standalone single. On 1 November, he headlined a benefit concert in Harare's Glamis Arena alongside Oliver Mtukudzi, Suluman Chimbetu, and Jah Prayzah.

=== 2014–2015: F'Victeam, Libre Parcours ===
In 2006, Ipupa formed a backing band called F'Victeam and later established his record label under the name F'Victeam Entertainment. The band consisted of guitarists, percussionists, drummers, keyboardists, singers, and atalakus. On 5 May 2014, Ipupa released the ndombolo-infused single "Original" on Facebook and YouTube to promote F'Victeam. The music video featured zouk vocalists Lynnsha and Fanny J and NBA player Serge Ibaka dancing to the song. It also included scenes from several of Ipupa's previous live shows. "Original" revived ndombolo, which had seen a decline partly due to the migration of Congolese artists to Europe; it amassed over two million views within six months on YouTube. Africa Radio listed it among the "10 iconic African hits that made the whole world dance". While promoting his group, Ipupa won Best Artist in Central Africa at the African Muzik Magazine Awards, held in Dallas, Texas. He then toured Washington as part of a US-Africa Summit, to which President Barack Obama had invited 47 African leaders, in August 2014. A dozen African artists were selected to attend, with Ipupa being the sole representative from Central Africa.

A few months after "Original"'s launch, Ipupa announced that he would produce F'Victeam's debut album, Libre Parcours. In October, he published the album cover on his Facebook page as well as a few videos of the recording sessions on Instagram. During an interview with Afropop Worldwide, Ipupa clarified that Libre Parcours is not his fourth studio album but that of his collective, for which he served as producer and featured artist on select tracks. Libre Parcours was released in March 2015 as a double album and included seven tracks featuring Ipupa, one with Shella Mputu (ex-singer of Quartier Latin International) and another with Christy Lova, daughter of Ntesa Dalienst. It sold nearly 15,000 copies in one week, including 5,000 following its launch.

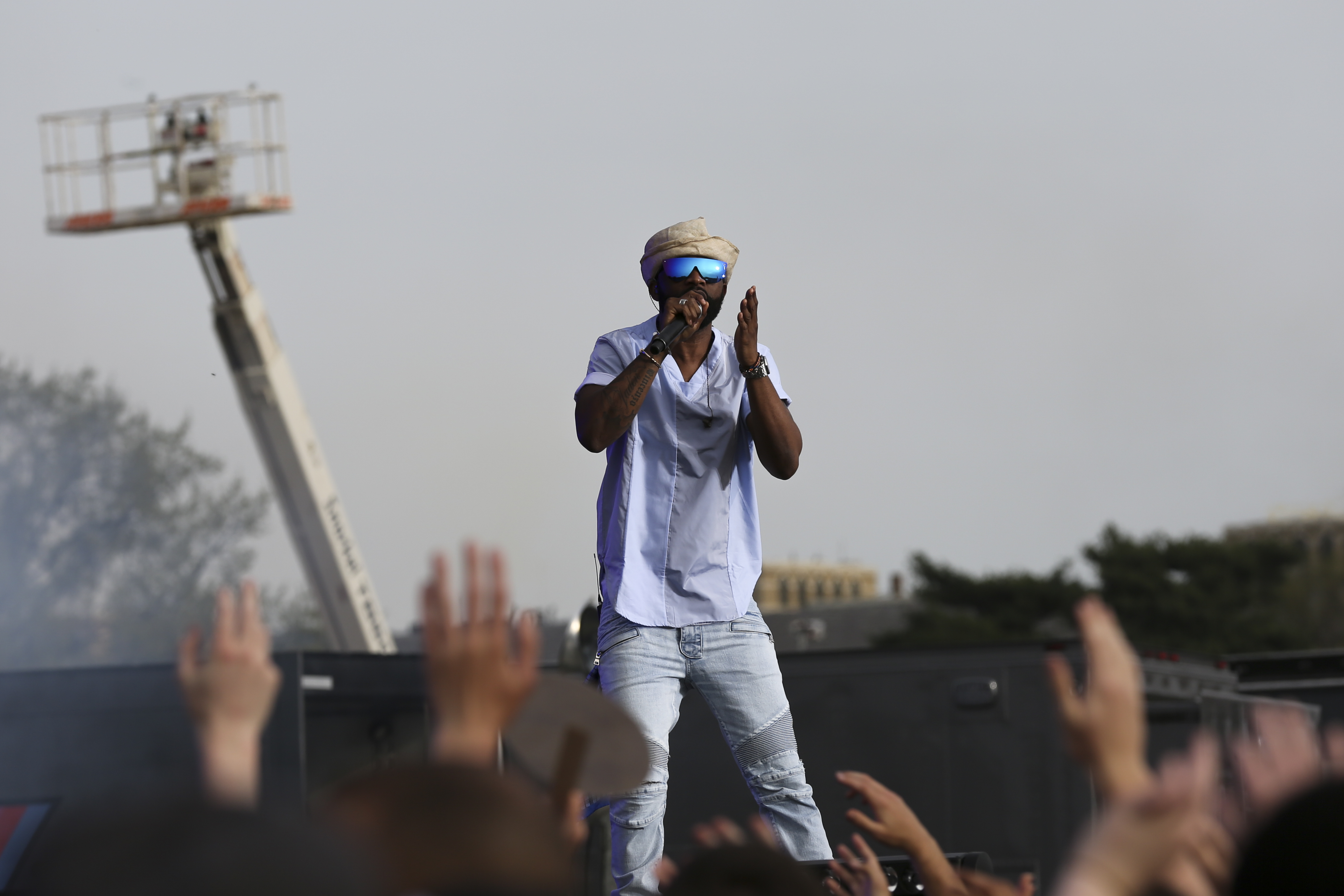
Ipupa performing at Global Citizen Earth Day, Washington, D.C., 2015

On 18 April 2015, Ipupa was invited to Washington by the World Bank to participate in Global Citizen Earth Day and delivered a concert on the National Mall in front of 250,000 people. After his visit to the US, he took part in the Anoumabo Urban Music Festival in Abidjan, an event organized by the Ivorian band Magic System. Ipupa was honored with the Special Prize for African Integration by the Ministry of African Integration and Ivorians Abroad. On 28 June, he received a nomination for Best International Act at the BET Awards. He also performed at the Grammy Museum in Los Angeles, singing the songs "La vie est belle", "Original", and "Libre Parcours 2". In September, he gave two performances, at Hotel Palm Camayenne and Esplanade of the People's Palace in Conakry, Guinea, in promotion of African music. On 21 August, he played at the People's Convention Center in Dallas, followed by a concert in Houston on 28 August. He presented his previous album, Power "Kosa Leka", on 29 August in Portland, followed by concerts in Atlanta on 30 August and Minneapolis on 4 September. On 5 September, Ipupa performed in Washington, concluding his American tour with a concert in New York on 6 September. He later returned to Dallas to participate in the AFRIMMA ceremony, where he was nominated for Best Central Africa Artist and Best African Artist. In Africa, he performed in Lubumbashi, Kolwezi, and Likasi, and was summoned by President José Eduardo dos Santos to be part of the observance of Angola's Independence Day on 11 November.

=== 2016–2017: Tokooos album and tours ===
Following his record deal with the AZ label in 2013, Ipupa began recording his first international album, Tokooos, in October 2015. He teamed up with Nigerian singer Wizkid in Paris to record a single, which came out on 6 October. In March 2016, he issued the single "Hymne Coca-Cola" on YouTube for a Coca-Cola campaign in the DRC. The next month, he was featured on the eponymous debut album by French rapper MHD, on the track "Ma vie". In May 2016, Julien Creuzard departed from AZ to establish the new label Elektra France, with Ipupa now under its banner. At the same time, he organized an American tour with F'Victeam and approached R. Kelly for collaboration on Tokooos. In late November 2016, he announced via Instagram a collaboration with French rapper Booba. Their single, "Kiname" (a contraction of Kinshasa and Paname, the latter being an etymologically unclear reference to the city of Paris), was released on 7 December, and the music video was made available on 14 December. "Kiname" was certified gold on 16 May 2017 by SNEP. Ipupa went on to release the single "Eloko Oyo" on 7 April, a traditional song of the Mongo people. On 16 June, Ipupa released "Bad Boy", featuring Aya Nakamura, a track that contains a sample of a guitar riff played by Simaro Lutumba in his 1983 song "Faute ya Commerçant".

On 22 June, Ipupa was scheduled to perform at La Cigale in Paris to present his forthcoming album. The proceeds from the concert were intended for donation to UNICEF to aid in the fight against chronic malnutrition among African youth. The show was canceled by the Paris Police Prefecture, however, due to concerns about potential "serious disturbances to public order" stemming from threats by the Combattants.

Thank you to all my warriors, and to all lovers of good music; thank you to the artists and composers who participated in this project; thank you to my teams, my label Elektra France, this is your golden record!

— Ipupa's statement after his album Tokooos received a gold certification from SNEP, 10 October 2022 (translated from French)

Tokooos was released on 7 July 2017 by Elektra France, a subsidiary of Warner Music France. The album entered the SNEP Top Albums at number 28 in July 2017, which was Ipupa's first appearance on the French album chart, and climbed to number 21 on Belgium's Ultratop Albums. In France, it spent 23 weeks on the Top Albums 200, reaching a peak position of 28. Tokooos marked a departure from Ipupa's previous work, as it ventured into urban music. The album comprised 18 tracks, with a range of styles from Congolese rumba, French hip hop, R&B, and ndombolo. The album's title derived its name from the Lingala word kitoko, signifying something good and exuding a positive aura. Building on this concept, Ipupa coined the term "Tokooos music" to describe his new artistic style and musical philosophy. In an interview with a BET Buzz affiliate in France, Ipupa stated that, "On my fourth album, I wanted to create a bridge between Kinshasa and Paris; I have done it all in Africa, but I would like to win this French market." On Tokooos, Ipupa experimented by singing some tracks entirely in French, whereas his previous material had mostly been sung in Lingala. The album included guest artists such as R. Kelly, Booba, MHD, Naza, KeBlack, Wizkid, Aya Nakamura, and Shay. As part of its promotion, he was invited to Frédéric Musa's urban show Planète Rap on Skyrock from 10 to 14 July.

Two tours were organized for Tokooos, collectively known as the Tokooos Tour, with approximately fifty concerts held in various international cities. The first leg commenced on 2 September 2017 in Lomé, Togo, and concluded on 19 February 2018 in Los Angeles. Ipupa capped off 2017 by winning the title of "Best International Artist of the Year" in the Skyrock 2017 awards. The second leg of the tour, held from March to August 2018, included concerts and showcases across African countries and Europe. In October 2020, Tokooos crossed the 50-million-stream mark on Spotify, and that month, it was certified gold by SNEP, with sales exceeding 50,000 copies. Ipupa became the first Kinshasa-based artist and the first solo act from Central Africa to receive a SNEP gold certification, while Tokooos also became the second Central African album to earn a SNEP gold disc after Bisso Na Bisso's Racines in 1999. On 10 May 2023, it became his first album to be certified platinum by the Centre National de la Musique, after sales topped 126,133 units. Africa Music & Charts awarded the album a sextuple-diamond certification, making it the most certified album by a solo artist.

=== 2018–2019: Control and Accor Arena concert ===
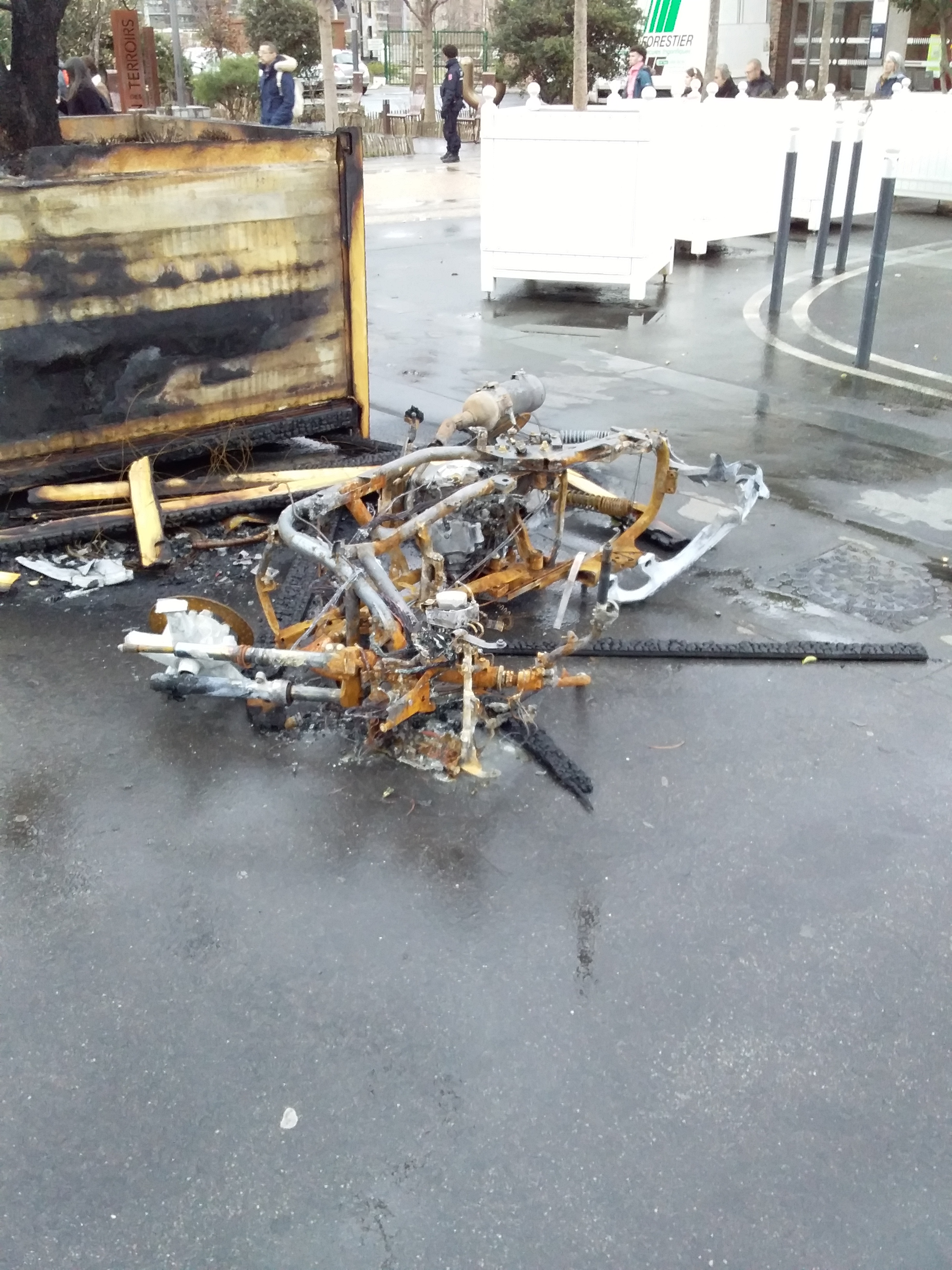
Motorcycle burned during the concert in front of Paris-Bercy station, February 2020

Recorded simultaneously with Tokooos since the end of 2016 and in preparation for his return to Congolese rumba, Ipupa released three promotional singles from his forthcoming fifth album, Control: "École", on 25 July 2018, "Canne à sucre" on 31 August 2018, and "Aime-moi" on 26 October 2018. Control was published on 2 November 2018. The album was mainly recorded in Ipupa's own studio, Tokooos Studio, and Studio Ndiaye in Kinshasa, with some finishing touches done in Parisian studios. It consisted of 31 songs, including the three previously released singles. Ipupa presented the record on the program Journal Afrique on TV5Monde a week after its release and announced a concert in Kinshasa on 30 November 2018. Control was a commercial success and peaked at No. 74 in France and No. 58 on Belgium's Wallonia album chart. It received a 4× diamond certification from Africa Music & Charts.

As had been his practice since 2015, Ipupa announced a summer world tour in 2019, which would cover the US, Zambia, South Africa, the Republic of the Congo, the DRC, and Australia. On 28 February 2020, Ipupa performed at the Accor Arena in Paris in front of 20,000 people. Due to the prohibition of several Congolese concerts on French territory arising from the specter of "serious disturbances to public order" precipitated by the belligerent Combatants, Didier Lallement, the prefect of Paris, passed a decree on 26 February 2020, banning all demonstrations in the vicinity of the arena, and established a security cordon around the venue. A few hours before the start of the concert, violence erupted around the Gare de Lyon by people accusing Ipupa of being too closely associated with the Congolese regime. Despite threats against Ipupa and the event, the concert sold out on the same day.

=== 2020–2022: Tokooos II, Tokooos II Gold ===
Ipupa taking the stage at the concert

In an interview with Afropop Worldwide on 10 July 2019, Ipupa announced that his sixth studio album, Tokooos II, was nearing completion. He later promoted the album with a concert at the Accor Arena in Paris on 28 February 2020. Tokooos II was released on 18 December 2020 by Elektra France. The digital edition contained 16 songs and the physical edition 22. The album features collaborations with Dadju, Naza, Ninho, and M. Pokora and fuses traditional Congolese rumba, soukous, ndombolo, R&B, and trap beats. Reviewing for Pan African Music, Rémi Benchebra described the album as being "guided by love, a theme dear to rumbists", and "a voice which combines fragility with power". Tokooos II was well-received, especially in European markets. It entered the SNEP Top 200 Albums, where it peaked at No. 80 for a week. The album also gained traction in Belgium, reaching No. 58 on Ultratop's Wallonia chart and No. 100 on Ultratop's Flanders chart. It earned a 4× diamond certification from Africa Music & Charts. The Congolese rumba-tinged single "Amore", in which Ipupa conveys his sorrow and yearning for the return of a departed lover, achieved gold certification from SNEP and exceeded one million Spotify streams in four months. The soukous-influenced track "Likolo", featuring Ninho, garnered five million Spotify streams in four months, while its music video amassed seven million YouTube views in a month and earned gold certification from SNEP. "Un Coup", a fusion of Congolese rumba and R&B performed with Dadju, racked up ten million YouTube views in its first month, made it onto Music in Africa's "15 trending clips in Central Africa", and was certified gold in May 2025 after exceeding 15 million streams outside of France. On 26 December 2020, Ipupa sold out the Sofitel Abidjan Hôtel Ivoire in Ivory Coast and received the Best African Artist of the Year prize at the fourth edition of the African Talents Awards. In February 2021, he performed at the Yaoundé Multipurpose Sports Complex in Cameroon in front of 3,000 people, in celebration of president Paul Biya's 88th birthday. To promote the album further, he unveiled a lineup of multiple African concerts, referred to as the "Tokoos II Tour Part I". It kicked off on 9 October in Dar es Salaam, Tanzania, and concluded on 10 January 2022, in Bafoussam, Cameroon. It covered 19 countries, primarily in French-speaking regions, where Ipupa performed with F'Victeam.

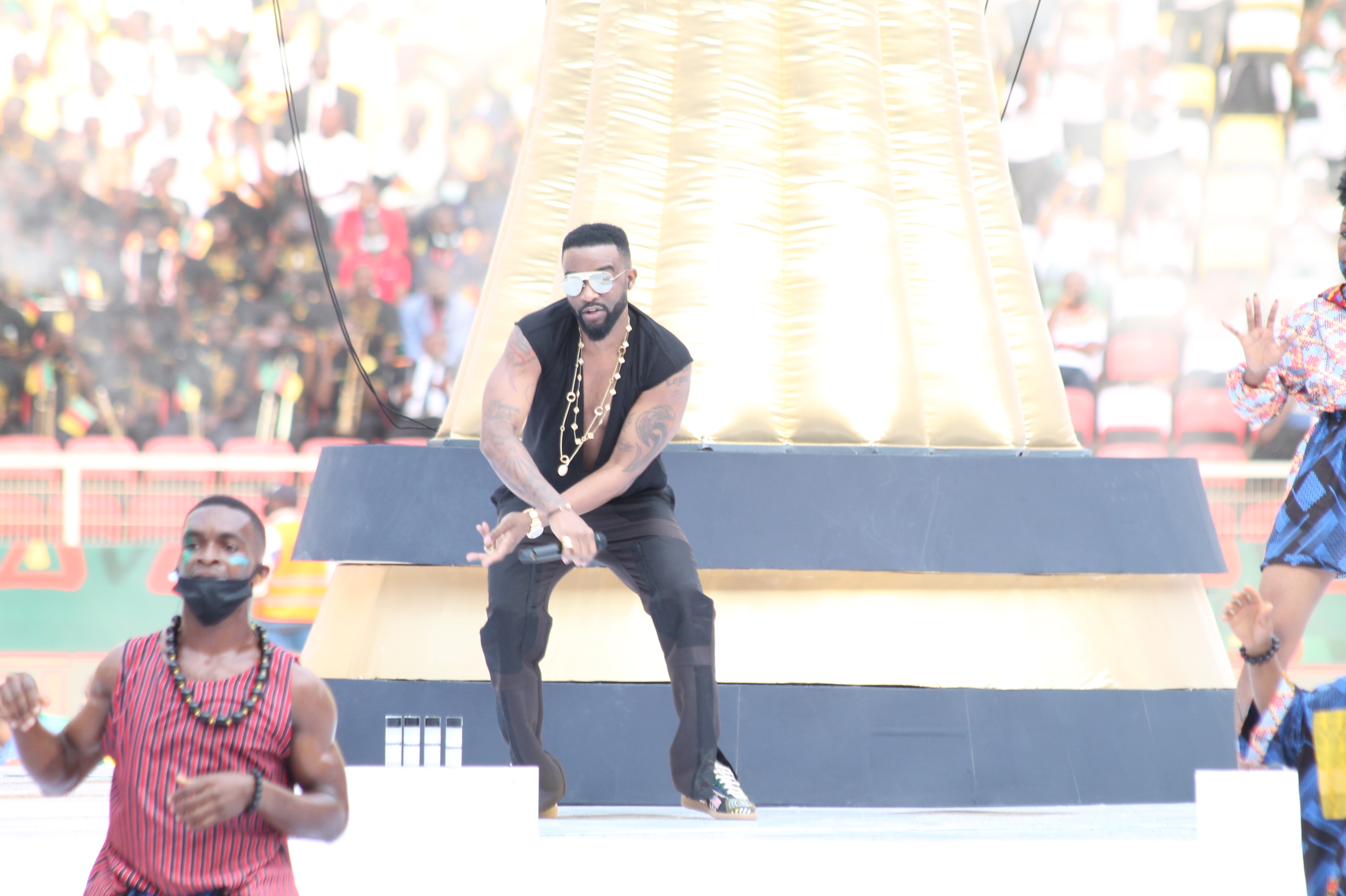
Ipupa performing at the opening of AFCON 2021

On 26 September 2021, while playing in Kinshasa at Foire Internationale de Kinshasa, Ipupa announced Tokooos II Gold, an expanded reissue of Tokooos II featuring 15 additional tracks. A few collaborations enrich Tokooos II Gold, including with Niska on "Chérie coco", Leto & Guy2Bezbar on "Sugar Daddy", Youssoupha on "B.A.T", and Youssou N'Dour on the remix of "Migrant des rêves". He released the promotional single "Nzoto" on 12 November, which blended ndombolo and traditional Congolese rumba, overlaid with Mongo sounds. Tokooos II Gold was released on 25 February 2022. Prior to its launch, it achieved commercial anticipation, peaking at No. 3 on iTunes France's best-selling pre-orders by 15 February. The album's release followed a successful period for Ipupa, including his recognition as Best Francophone Male Artist at the 7th African Entertainment Awards USA on 26 December 2021 and a performance at the opening ceremony of the 2021 Africa Cup of Nations at Olembe Stadium in Cameroon.

In mid-2022, five months after the album's debut, Ipupa launched the "Golden World Tour", performing in major cities across Africa, Europe, and the Middle East, including stops in Luanda, Brazzaville, Amsterdam, Paris, London, Brussels, Porto, Spa, Cabinda, Dubai, Düsseldorf, Pointe-Noire, and Kinshasa.

=== 2023–2024: Formule 7, Macron-Ipupa diplomacy sparks ===
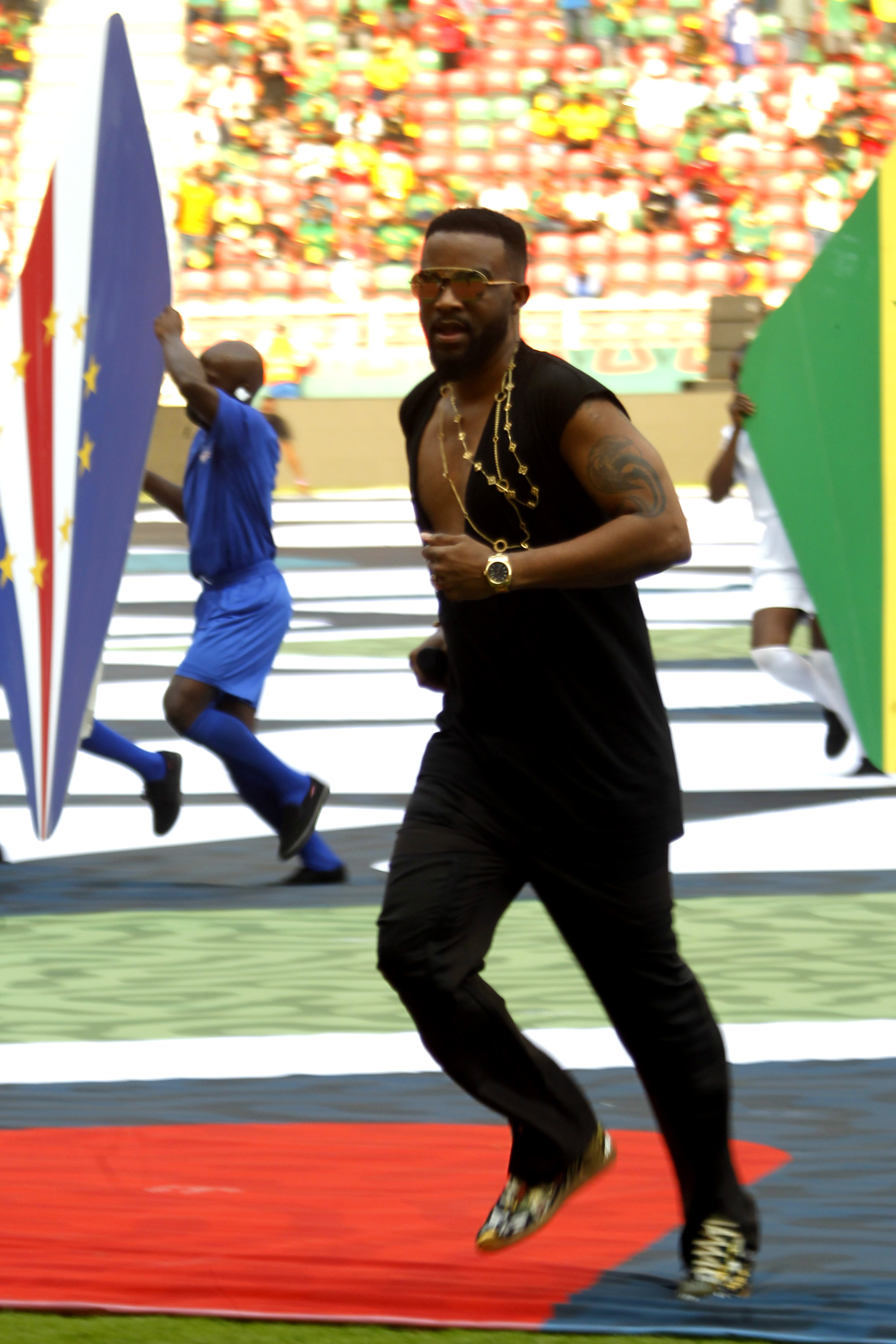
Ipupa in January 2022

On 17 October 2022, during an interview with the French television channel France 24, Ipupa announced the release of his seventh studio album, Formule 7. On 28 October, he posted three singles from the album on YouTube—"Bloqué" (composed with Alex Shua), "Science-Fiction", and "Se yo"—which garnered millions of views. Formule 7 came out on 16 December on Elektra France. It consisted of 32 tracks, with a predominant blend of Congolese rumba. Ipupa told RFI, "With Formule 7, I return to the source, to the basic structure of rumba, while bringing my personal touch with chords and arrangements". Cameroonian singer Charlotte Dipanda made a guest appearance on the track "Garde du cœur". The track "Afsana" fused Haitian kompa with Congolese rumba, inspired by a beat sent by a Congolese producer residing in Russia. Meanwhile, "Lady D" paid homage to Franco Luambo's 1985 hit "Mario" with a sampled rhythm and melody. Formule 7 became the first Congolese rumba album to receive a gold export certification from SNEP in 2024, before later earning platinum certification in 2025 after accumulating 114,282 equivalent streams. It also received a 3× diamond certification from Africa Music & Charts and generated more than three million Spotify streams within its first 24 hours and ranked among the top-selling albums on the French iTunes, peaking at No. 25, as well as reaching No. 85 on the SNEP Top 200 Albums chart for eight non-consecutive weeks and gaining a No. 134 peak in Belgium. On Boomplay, two years post-release, Formule 7 exceeded 200 million streams, with "Mayday" being the platform's most-streamed track. On 5 January 2023, Ipupa appeared at the Sofitel Abidjan Hôtel Ivoire to promote the record. He won the All Africa Music Award for Best Male Artist in Central Africa and was nominated for Best Artiste in African Contemporary for the hit single "Bloqué".

On 26 February, French President Emmanuel Macron summoned Ipupa to the Élysée Palace as part of his approach to France–Africa relations. Afterward, Ipupa posted on his Twitter that he had discussed the ongoing Kivu conflict and the role of Congolese music among young people with Macron. On 6 March, the French president attended Ipupa's concert in Kinshasa, where they were spotted drinking beer and waving to the audience. Their meeting elicited mixed reactions, with some critics alleging that Macron was leveraging Ipupa's image for his benefit and insinuating French support for ongoing fighting between Rwandan-backed M23 rebels and Congolese government forces.

Promotional poster for Ipupa's concert at LDLC Arena in July 2024

On 27 May, Ipupa sold out Stade Alphonse Massemba-Débat in the Republic of the Congo and subsequently performed at the opening ceremony of the 2023 Jeux de la Francophonie in Kinshasa, on 28 July. On 25 November 2023, Ipupa sold out Paris La Défense Arena, becoming the first African solo artist to do so. He brought a lineup of musicians to the stage, including Aya Nakamura, SDM, Mokobé, KeBlack, Naza, Dadju, Tayc, Singuila, Youssou N'Dour, RJ Kanierra, and Petit Fally. He was later awarded a gold plaque for selling 40,000 tickets to the show. N'Dour extolled Ipupa and the concert on his X, Instagram, and Facebook accounts, stating, "This evening I felt the DRC, Africa communing with you. What a beautiful show!" Tayc expressed his gratitude on Instagram, saying, "Big Brother, don't change anything, your people love you". On 8 December, Ipupa performed at Wembley Arena in London, in front of 12,500 people, becoming the first Congolese artist to achieve this feat since Abeti Masikini, in 1986. On 13 December, he sold out the ING Arena in Brussels, three days ahead of his scheduled concert. During preparations for the concert and in the company of the Brussels mayor, Philippe Close, Ipupa was awarded a commemorative plaque for the sold-out concert. He then performed at the LDLC Arena in Lyon on 6 July 2024, followed by a sold-out concert at Arkéa Arena in Floirac, France. On 14 July, Ipupa performed at the multi-day music festival Les Ardentes in Liège, Wallonia, before playing at the Neema Fest in Milan.

On 26 July, Ipupa released the single "207", a collaboration with fellow Mongo folk singer René Soso Pembé, which exalts Mongo cultural roots. The song is sung in Mongo and Lingala, with Ipupa, Pembé, and F'Victeam clad in traditional Mongo garments. Directed by Christ Kingombo and produced by Théo Tama, the track's arrangement centers around Anamongo rhythms infused with sebene. In a Jeune Afrique interview, Ipupa remarked, "we really have to go back to our roots, to our culture to make hits..." Within four days, "207" racked up over a million views on YouTube, taking No. 2 on Congo's YouTube weekly chart, with 402,000 views that July. The single also set off a viral trend of Mongo-style hip-swaying dancing across social media, inspiring numerous personalities to partake in dance challenges. On 4 October, Ipupa took part in the opening ceremony of the 19th International Organisation of La Francophonie summit, where he addressed the ongoing Kivu conflicts in the eastern DRC. The next day, he was invited by French President Macron to perform at the exclusive summit gala dinner held at the Élysée Palace, attended by heads of state and other distinguished guests. Ipupa concluded the summit with a private concert at the La Gaîté Lyrique hall in Paris, becoming the first Congolese musician to perform at the venue. He later sold out the Mitsubishi Electric Halle in Düsseldorf, Germany, on 12 December, and took the stage at the Mother Africa Festival in Abidjan, Ivory Coast, on 27 December.

=== 2025–present: performances, standalone releases, XX, Stade de France, and O2 Arena ===
On 1 January 2025, at the request of Gabonese president Brice Oligui Nguema, Ipupa performed in Oyem's public square for New Year's celebrations, entertaining dignitaries and government officials. The following day, he gave an exclusive performance at the Palais du Bord de Mer in Libreville. On 4 January, Ipupa returned to the Sofitel Hôtel Ivoire in Abidjan, where he was joined onstage by fellow Congolese-French rapper Tiakola. After canceled New Year's concerts in Conakry on 31 December 2024 and 1 January 2025, he rescheduled and sold out two back-to-back performances. The first, a private affair, was held on 10 January at Chapiteau by Issa, followed by a public concert at Stade Petit Story on 11 January. On 29 March, Ipupa released the Congolese rumba-inspired single "Mayanga", along with its accompanying music video. Produced by Daniel Obasi for Vlisco Group and directed by Obasi, the video promotes African wax prints. The song is described by the brand as "an expression of admiration—a love letter to African women, their beauty, and the confidence they exude in Vlisco fabrics".

On 22 April, Ipupa, alongside co-headliners Youssoupha and Gims, led a sold-out benefit concert, Solidarité Congo, at the Accor Arena. The event, which was organized by HCDC and Team HEROS, in partnership with Dadju's Give Back Charity, featured 30 artists, including prominent French rap acts and international and Congolese musicians, and sought to raise funds for child victims affected by the M23 insurgency in the eastern Democratic Republic of the Congo, with proceeds allocated to Give Back Charity. The show, initially slated for 7 April, was postponed due to its overlap with the International Day of Remembrance of the 1994 Rwandan genocide. On 2 May, Ipupa released the single "Le Temps". On 4 July, he appeared on Angélique Kidjo's single "Nadi Balance", alongside Sheila Maurice-Grey and Nigerian highlife band the Cavemen. He later took part in the opening ceremony of the inaugural World Music and Tourism Festival on 16 July at the Palais du Peuple in Kinshasa, an event organized by the Congolese government with assistance from UN Tourism. By 22 July, Ipupa was ranked as the most-streamed Congolese artist by Billboard France, among artists who launched their careers in the DRC or the Republic of the Congo.

On 16 March 2026, Ipupa announced that his eighth studio project, XX— which he began recording in October 2022, following the release of Formule 7— would be released in two parts. The first installment, XX, was released on 17 April 2026 and contains 20 tracks, with guest appearances by Calema, DJ Maphorisa, Joé Dwèt Filé, Angélique Kidjo, Tresor, Lokua Kanza, Keblack, Guy2Bezbar, SDM, and Wizkid. The second installment, XX : Délirium, was initially scheduled for 10 June before being postponed to 18 September 2026. Conceived as the rumba-oriented counterpart to the more internationally influenced first installment, XX : Délirium comprises 51 tracks across four discs and places greater emphasis on Congolese rumba. The first installment topped the SNEP Top Albums chart, making Ipupa the first African artist to reach number one there.

Earlier in February 2024, Ipupa had announced plans to perform at the Stade de France and confirmed in March that the concert would take place in 2025. In October 2025, the date was postponed to 2 May 2026 to celebrate the 20th anniversary of Ipupa's career. The concert was quickly sold out in November 2025 before its rescheduled date, and a second show was added for 3 May 2026, and it also sold out. This made Ipupa the first African artist to sell out the Stade de France over two consecutive nights. Both concerts were organized by GDP Productions. The first show included guest artists SDM, Matt Pokora, Joe Dwet Filé, Theodora, Mokobé, Youssou N'Dour, Guy2Bezbar, Wizkid, and René Soso Pembe. An emotional scene took place when Ipupa was joined onstage by his daughter, Malka Monikel, which the Congolese music outlet Mbote.cd said "transformed the concert into an intimate celebration". Radio France Internationale praised the show for its "pyrotechnic effects galore, elaborate choreography, repeated costume changes, endless hits". The second concert brought a different lineup of guest artists, including Gaz Mawete, Zaïko Langa Langa, Ben-J, Guy2Bezbar, Keblack, Naza, Lynnsha, Tayc, Lokua Kanza, Calema, Diamond Platnumz, Fiston Saï Saï, Joé Dwèt Filé, Celé Mfumu, Dolly Mafinga, and Petit Fally.

On 24 April 2026, Ipupa appeared with Youssou N'Dour on Taratata, the French television music programme, to perform "Migrants Des Rêves". Continuing the anniversary celebrations, he announced on 3 May that he would perform at London's O2 Arena on 25 October. Tickets quickly sold out on 26 June, ahead of the rescheduled date, and a second concert was added for 24 October. Both concerts were organized by Congolese-born British promoter Johnny Moko, who died on 13 August and was honored by Ipupa during the first concert, which featured Stanley Enow, Joé Dwèt Filé and Awilo Longomba. Guy2Bezbar and Tiwa Savage joined Ipupa at the second. Mbote.cd described the concerts as a showcase of "contemporary Congolese music across generations and styles".

== 2022 Stade des Martyrs crowd crush ==
On 1 March 2022, Ipupa announced a concert at Stade des Martyrs de la Pentecôte in Kinshasa, scheduled for 29 October. The event was part of his "Golden World Tour", from 4 June to 3 October. Though the venue could only accommodate 80,000 spectators, over 120,000 people showed up for the show. During the performance, Ipupa was joined onstage by Charlotte Dipanda, Gaz Mawete, Awilo Longomba, Mignon Abraham, DG Virus, Manon Loubaki, Pathy Nsaraza, Naty Lokole, Fiston Kolokey, Vany Morgane, Souley Kahuka, as well as his former bandmates from Quartier Latin International, Sam Tshintu, Modogo Abarambwa, Jipson Butukondolo, Champion Djicapela, Montana Kamenga, and Babia Ndonga Shokoro's son, Prince Babia. Producers Dany Synthé and Seysey were also in attendance. Claudy Siar and Juliette Fievet presented him with a gold record for his album Tokooos. During the performance, a crowd crush occurred, and the ensuing pandemonium resulted in eleven deaths, including two police officers, according to the Minister of the Interior and Security, Decentralization, and Customary Affairs, Daniel Aselo.

== Philanthropy ==
=== Fally Ipupa Foundation ===
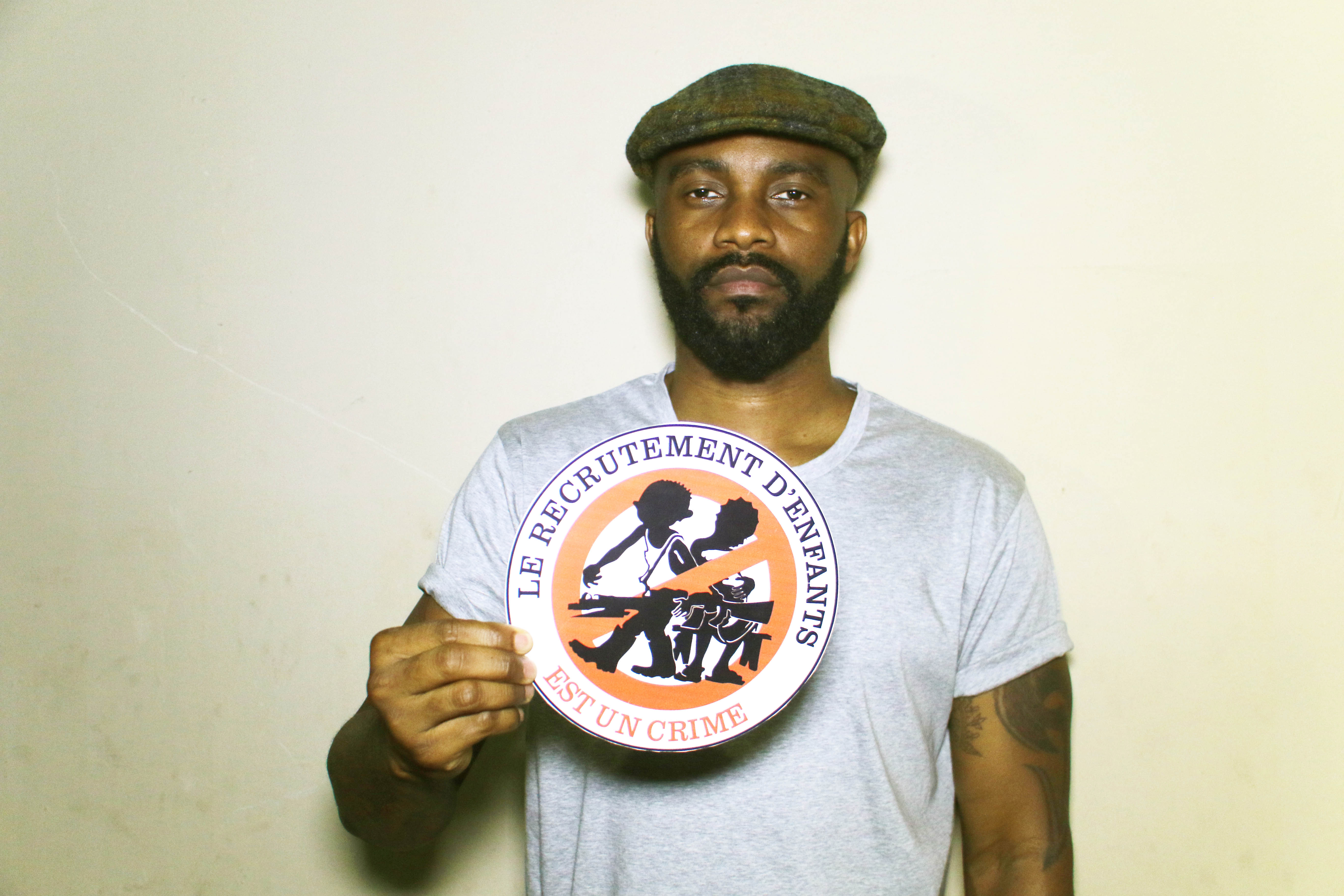
Ipupa as part of celebrations of the Day of the African Child, with the aim of safeguarding children's protection during times of armed conflict, June 2018.

In 2013, Ipupa established the Fally Ipupa Foundation, a nonprofit organization that provides assistance to marginalized groups in the Democratic Republic of the Congo, such as victims of sexual violence, those afflicted with disease, and orphans.

=== UNICEF ===
In 2017, Ipupa partnered with UNICEF to fight malnutrition, which affects ten million children across the Democratic Republic of the Congo annually.

On 20 August 2021, he was appointed UNICEF National Ambassador to the Democratic Republic of the Congo, in connection with World Breastfeeding Week. During this time, he actively promoted the development, preservation, and reinforcement of feeding practices for infants and young children. On 22 February 2024, he renewed his position.

=== Charity football match ===
On 24 April 2024, Ipupa partook in a charity football match presided over by French First Lady Brigitte Macron, aimed at raising funds for hospitalized children and teenagers through her foundation, Opération Pièces jaunes. Organized by the Variétés Club de France, the match saw the involvement of President Emmanuel Macron, alongside professional football players such as Jens Lehmann, Laure Boulleau, Taye Taiwo, Laurent Blanc, Rudi Garcia, Didier Deschamps, Marcel Desailly, Robert Pirès, Eden Hazard, Didier Drogba, Johan Neeskens, Mamadou Niang, Christian Karembeu, Karl Olive, Bernard Mendy, Arsène Wenger, Daniel Van Buyten, Ciryl Gane, Sonny Anderson, Wilfrid Mbappé, Samuel Eto'o, Emmanuel Adebayor, El-Hadji Diouf, Alain Giresse, Redouane Bougheraba, Frédéric Piquionne, Pascal Feindouno, Souleymane Diawara, Océane Daniel, and Bruno Cheyrou. Following the match, a reception was hosted at the Élysée Palace by President Macron, which Ipupa attended.

== Discography ==
=== Albums ===
Year	Album title and details	Peak			Certifications (sales threshold)
Year	Album title and details	FRA	BEL (Fl)	BEL (Wa)	Certifications (sales threshold)
2006	Droit Chemin: Released: 2006; Label: Obouo Music	—	—	—	
2009	Arsenal de Belles Melodies: Released: 2009; Label: Obouo Music	—	—	—	
2013	Power "Kosa Leka": Released: 11 September 2013; Label: Obouo Music	—	—	—	
2017	Tokooos: Released: 7 July 2017; Label: Elektra France / Warner Music France	28	110	21	SNEP: Gold; Centre National de la Musique: Platinum; Africa Music & Charts: 6× diamond
2018	Control: Released: 2 November 2018; Label: Elektra France / Warner Music France	74	—	58	Africa Music & Charts: 4× diamond
2020	Tokooos II: Released: 18 December 2020; Label: Elektra France / Warner Music France	80	100	58	Africa Music & Charts: 4× diamond
2022	Formule 7: Released: 16 December 2022; Label: Elektra France / Warner Music France	85	—	150	Centre National de la Musique: Platinum; Africa Music & Charts: 3× diamond
2026	XX: Released: 17 April 2026; Label: Elektra France / Warner Music France	1	152	14	

=== Singles ===
==== As lead artist ====
Year	Title	Peak positions		Certification	Album
Year	Title	FRA	BEL (Wa)	Certification	Album
2017	"Kiname" (featuring Booba)	10	38	FRA: Gold	Tokooos
2017	"Bad Boy" (featuring Aya Nakamura)	69	Tip	SNEP: Platinum; Centre National de la Musique: Platinum	Tokooos
2017	"Nidja" (featuring R. Kelly)	—	Tip		Tokooos
2017	"Eloko Oyo"	—	—	FRA: Diamond	Tokooos
2017	"Mannequin" (featuring KeBlack and Naza)	—	—	FRA: Platinum	Tokooos
2017	"Juste une danse"	—	—	FRA: Platinum	Tokooos
2018	"Maria PM"	—	—	FRA: Platinum	Control
2018	"A Flyé"	—	—	FRA: Gold	Control
2018	"École"	—	—	FRA: Gold	Control
2018	"Aime-moi"	—	—	FRA: Gold	Control
2018	"Roi Manitou"	—	—	FRA: Gold	Control
2018	"One Love"	—	—	FRA: Gold	Control
2020	"Likolo" (featuring Ninho)	162	Tip	FRA: Platinum	Tokooos II
2020	"Un Coup" (featuring Dadju)	—	—	FRA: Platinum	Tokooos II
2020	"Amore"	—	—	FRA: Gold	Tokooos II
2021	"Ça bouge pas"	—	—	FRA: Gold	Tokooos II Gold
2022	"Mayday"	—	—	FRA: Platinum	Formule 7
2022	"Alliance"	—	—	FRA: Gold	Formule 7
2022	"Bloqué"	—	—	FRA: Gold	Formule 7
2022	"SL"	—	—	FRA: Gold	Formule 7
2022	"Afsana"	—	—	FRA: Gold	Formule 7

==== As featured artist ====
Year	Title	Peak positions		Certification	Album
Year	Title	FRA	BEL (Wa)	Certification	Album
2016	"Ma vie" (MHD featuring Fally Ipupa)	145	—		MHD
2017	"Trouvez la moi" (Dadju featuring KeBlack & Fally Ipupa)	38	—	FRA: Gold	Gentleman 2.0
2019	"À Kinshasa" (Ninho featuring Fally Ipupa)	11	—	FRA: Platinum	Destin
2020	"Fais ça bien" (Damso featuring Fally Ipupa)	17	—	FRA: Gold	QALF

== Awards and nominations ==
Year	Event	Prize	Recipient	Result	Ref.
2001	Association des Chroniqueurs de Musique du Congo	Revelation of the Year	Himself	Won	
2001	Association des Chroniqueurs de Musique du Congo	Best Song	"Éternellement"	Won	
2001	Association des Chroniqueurs de Musique du Congo	Breakthrough Male Artist	Himself	Won	
2007	IRAWMA Awards	Best Soukous Entertainer	Himself	Nominated	
2007	Trophées des Arts Afro-Caribéens	Best Male Performer	Himself	Won	
2007	Césaire de la Musique	Best Male Performer	Himself	Won	
2007	Kora Awards	Best Artist of Central Africa	Himself	Nominated	
2007	Pan-African Black Music Awards	Best African Artist	Himself	Won	
2008	Kundé	Best Male Artist in Central Africa	Himself	Won	
2010	Ndule Awards	Best Album of the Year	Arsenal de Belles Melodies	Won	
2010	Ndule Awards	Best Video	"Chaise Électrique" (with Olivia Longott)	Won	
2010	Ndule Awards	Best Song	"Délibération"	Won	
2010	MTV Africa Music Awards	Artist of the Year	Himself	Nominated	
2010	MTV Africa Music Awards	Best Male	Himself	Nominated	
2010	MTV Africa Music Awards	Best Video	"Sexy Dance" (with Krys)	Won	
2010	MTV Africa Music Awards	Best Francophone	Himself	Won	
2010	Soundcity Music Video Awards	Best Central	Himself	Won	
2011	Museke Online Music Awards	Artist of the Year	Himself	Won	
2011	Museke Online Music Awards	Most Popular Song of the Year	"Sexy Dance" (with Krys)	Won	
2011	Museke Online Music Awards	Central African Song of the Year	"Sexy Dance" (with Krys)	Won	
2011	Museke Online Music Awards	Best African Collaboration	"Jukpa Remix" (with J. Martins)	Won	
2011	BET Awards	Best International Act: Africa	Himself	Nominated	
2011	MTV Europe Music Awards	Best African Act	Himself	Nominated	
2011	Nigeria Entertainment Awards	Best Pan African Artist	Himself	Won	
2013	TRACE Urban Music Awards	Best African Artist	Himself	Won	
2013	Nigeria Entertainment Awards	Eastern African Artist/Group of the Year	Himself	Nominated	
2014	MTV Africa Music Awards	Best Live Act	Himself	Nominated	
2014	AFRIMMA	Best Male Central Africa	Himself	Won	
2014	Nigeria Entertainment Awards	African Artist of the Year	Himself	Nominated	
2015	Anoumabo Urban Music Festival	Special Prize for African Integration	Himself	Won	
2015	Ndule Awards	Artist of the Year	Himself	Won	
2015	IRAWMA Awards	Best Soukous Entertainer	Libre Parcours (with F'Victeam)	Won	
2015	BET Awards	Best International Act: Africa	Himself	Nominated	
2015	Africa Top Success Awards	Most Influential African Male Personality of the Year	Himself	Won	
2017	AFRIMMA	Best Francophone Artist	Himself	Won	
2017	AFRIMMA	Video of the Year	"Eloko Oyo"	Won	
2017	AFRIMMA	Artist of the Year	Himself	Nominated	
2017	AFRIMMA	Best Collaboration	"Kiname" (with Booba)	Nominated	
2017	AFRIMMA	Song of the Year	"Eloko Oyo"	Nominated	
2017	Votes Planète Rap	International Artist of the Year	Himself	Won	
2017	Trace Africa	Best Song of the Year	"Eloko Oyo"	Won	
2018	Kundé d'Or	Special Kundé	Himself	Won	
2018	AFRIMA	Best Male Artist in Central Africa	Himself	Won	
2018	AFRIMMA	Best Male Artiste in Central Africa	Himself	Won	
2018	AFRIMMA	Artist of the Year	Himself	Won	
2018	AFRIMMA	Leadership in Music	Himself	Won	
2018	BET Awards	Best International Act	Himself	Nominated	
2018	MTV Europe Music Awards	Best African Act	Himself	Nominated	
2019	Pool Malebo Music Awards	Best Artist	Himself	Won	
2019	Pool Malebo Music Awards	Artist of the Decade	Himself	Won	
2019	AFRIMMA	Best Central African Artist	Himself	Won	
2019	AFRIMMA	Best Collaboration	"Inama" (with Diamond Platnumz)	Nominated	
2019	AFRIMMA	Best Live Act	Himself	Nominated	
2019	AFRIMMA	Song of the Year	"Inama" (with Diamond Platnumz)	Nominated	
2019	AFRIMMA	Video of the Year	"Inama" (with Diamond Platnumz)	Nominated	
2019	Canal 2'Or	Best African Artist	Himself	Won	
2019	AFRIMMA	Artist of the Year	Himself	Nominated	
2019	AEAUSA	Best Francophone Artist	Himself	Nominated	
2019	AEAUSA	Best Male Artist in Central	Himself	Nominated	
2020	AFRIMMA	Best Male Central Africa	Himself	Won	
2020	AFRIMMA	Video of the Year	"C'est Rate" (with Gaz Mawete)	Won	
2020	AFRIMMA	Best Francophone	Himself	Won	
2020	AFRIMMA	Artist of the Year	Himself	Nominated	
2020	AFRIMMA	Best Live Act	Himself	Nominated	
2020	African Talent Awards	Best African Artist of the Year	Himself	Won	
2020	AEAUSA	Best Male Artist	Himself	Nominated	
2020	AEAUSA	Best Francophone Artist	Himself	Nominated	
2020	AEAUSA	Best Male Artist in Central Africa	Himself	Nominated	
2021	Canal 2'Or	Francophone African Artist	Himself	Won	
2021	AFRIMA	Best Male in Central Africa	Himself	Won	
2021	AFRIMA	Best Duo in African Dance or Choreography	"Berna Reloaded" (with Diamond Platnumz and Flavour)	Won	
2021	AFRIMA	Artiste of the Year	Himself	Nominated	
2021	AFRIMA	Best African Collaboration	"Où est le mariage" (with Shan'L)	Nominated	
2021	AFRIMA	Best African Video	"Berna Reloaded" (with Diamond Platnumz and Flavour)	Nominated	
2021	AFRIMA	Songwriter of the Year	"Un Coup" (with Dadju and Julio Masidi)	Nominated	
2021	AFRIMMA	Best Male in Central Africa	Himself	Won	
2021	AFRIMMA	Video of the Year	"Berna Reloaded" (with Diamond Platnumz and Flavour)	Won	
2021	AEAUSA	Best Francophone Male Artist	Himself	Won	
2021	AEAUSA	Best Male Artist in Central Africa	Himself	Nominated	
2021	MTV Africa Music Awards	Best Francophone Act	Himself	Nominated	
2021	MTV Africa Music Awards	Best Fan Base Award	Himself	Nominated	
2022	BET Awards	Best International Act	Himself	Nominated	
2022	AFRIMMA	Best Francophone	Himself	Won	
2022	EAEA	Artist of the Year	Himself	Won	
2022	AEAUSA	Best Francophone Male Artist	Himself	Won	
2023	AEAUSA	Best Collaboration	"Garde du Coeur" (with Charlotte Dipanda)	Nominated	
2023	EAEA	Album of the Year	Formule 7	Nominated	
2023	EAEA	Hit Single of the Year	"Bloqué"	Nominated	
2023	EAEA	People's Choice Live Performer of the Year	Himself	Won	
2023	AEUSA	Best Music Video	"Se Yo"	Nominated	
2023	AEUSA	Best Francophone Male Artist	Himself	Nominated	
2023	Pool Malebo Music Awards	Best Artist	Himself	Won	
2023	Pool Malebo Music Awards	Artist of the Decade	Himself	Won	
2023	Trace Awards & Festival	Best Live	Himself	Won	
2023	Trace Awards & Festival	Best Francophone African Artist	Himself	Nominated	
2023	Afroca Music Awards	Best African Male Artist	Himself	Won	
2023	Les Flammes	Exceptional Flame	Himself	Won	
2023	AFRIMA	Best Francophone	Himself	Won	
2023	AFRIMMA	Best Male Central Africa	Himself	Nominated	
2023	AFRIMMA	Best Live	Himself	Nominated	
2023	AFRIMMA	Best Collaboration	"Garde du Coeur" (with Charlotte Dipanda)	Nominated	
2023	AEAUSA	Best Collaboration	"Garde du Coeur" (with Charlotte Dipanda)	Nominated	
2023	AFRIMMA	Best Francophone	Himself	Won	
2023	AFRIMMA	Lifetime Achievement Award	With Timaya	Won	
2023	EAEA	People's Choice Live Performer	Himself	Won	
2023	Jayli Awards	Best Artist of the Year	Himself	Won	
2023	Jayli Awards	Best Central African Artist	Himself	Won	
2023	Victoires de la Musique Guinéenne	Best Central African Artist	Himself	Won	
2023	Zikomo Africa Awards	Album of the Year	Formule 7	Nominated	
2024	EAEA	Song of the Year	"Mayday"	Won	
2024	AEAUSA	Best Male Artist	Himself	Nominated	
2024	AEAUSA	Best Francophone Male Artist	Himself	Nominated	
2024	Mundi Music Awards	Best Male Artist	Himself	Won	
2024	Mundi Music Awards	Best Album	Formule 7	Won	
2024	Mundi Music Awards	Best Lyrics	"Mayday"	Won	
2024	Mundi Music Awards	Best Dance	"Formule 7"	Nominated	
2024	Mundi Music Awards	Best Choreographer Artist	Himself	Nominated	
2024	Mundi Music Awards	Best International Artist	Himself	Won	
2024	Mundi Music Awards	Best Live Performance	Himself	Won	
2024	Mundi Music Awards	Best Phenomenal Artist	Himself	Nominated	
2025	Trace Awards & Festival	Best Live Performance	Himself	Won	
2025	Trace Awards & Festival	Best Global African Artist	Himself	Nominated	
2025	Trace Awards & Festival	Best Male Artist	Himself	Nominated	
2026	AFRIMA	Artist of the Year	Himself	Nominated	
2026	AFRIMMA	Artist of the Year	Himself	Won	
2026	AFRIMMA	Crossing Boundaries with Music Award	Himself	Won	

== Decorations and honours ==
On 3 June 2026, Ipupa was appointed Knight of the National Order of the Leopard by the President Félix Tshisekedi. He was formally decorated during an officially ceremony held on 6 June 2026.
