= Libanga =

Term in Congolese music

In Congolese popular music, the term libanga (Lingala; from kobwaka libanga, lit. 'to throw a stone/pebble', referring to how a child might try to attract attention), or in the plural mabanga, denotes a common form of patronage whereby musicians name or praise wealthy or powerful sponsors publicly as part of their performances. A libanga is usually inserted into a song through listing individual names between verses or between verses and chorus. They can be sung, spoken, or shouted depending on context. Sometimes they are included for the purposes of a particular performance, or included in a recording.

According to Bob White, it forms part of a "practice of commercialized praise singing" which emerged in Zaire in the 1970s and grew in importance in subsequent decades. He states that "[t]he phenomenon of libanga has become an integral part of contemporary popular music in Kinshasa, and it reflects not only musicians' urgent need for money but also the political culture of the Mobutu regime, which, through the mechanism of animation politique, customarily handed out financial and political resources in exchange for public displays of flattery and loyalty".

Patronage remains central to the music industry in the Democratic Republic of the Congo, and it is difficult to make commercial music without it. The Economist observed that a libanga is "not done out of ideological conviction" and noted that one song by the musician Werrason names 110 people "many of whom would have paid for the privilege". The custom expanded dramatically in the 1990s and 2000s with artists such as Papa Wemba, Koffi Olomide, Werrason, JB Mpiana, and King Kester Emeneya contributing to its growth.

== History ==
Much of the early development of libanga took place in Zaire during the 1970s, before the practice became closely associated with the Congolese diaspora in Europe, particularly in Paris and within the Sape movement. Congolese expatriates, sometimes referred to by musicians as "Parisians", sought public recognition through dedications in songs recorded by visiting artists. In return, musicians could receive accommodation, clothing, money, and other forms of material support. Over time, libanga became an established feature of Congolese recordings, with prominent members of the diaspora regularly acknowledged by name. Its reach eventually extended beyond the diaspora to politicians, religious leaders, businesspeople, military and police officials, media personalities, and other influential figures. These exchanges could involve cash or material goods, while some patrons commissioned entire songs or specified how and where their names would be featured in a recording.

By the 1990s, Koffi Olomidé emerged as one of its most prolific users. His 1994 album Magie reportedly included around 80 dedications. Papa Wemba highlighted the practice's social dimension, observing that many of those named in songs were themselves present in recording studios and at concerts. Libanga also developed a significant monetary dimension, with contemporary accounts describing payments of roughly €1,000 for some dedications and up to about €3,050 for more prominent names. On the 1996 Wemba–Koffi Olomidé collaboration Wake Up, some dedications were reportedly valued at 10,000 French francs, or approximately €1,524 at the time.

=== Diaspora influence and commercialization ===
As practice became more common in the Congolese music industry, nightclub, restaurant, and entertainment venue owners became important gatekeepers for its circulation within the diaspora. These establishments were central gathering places for Congolese communities and provided spaces where new releases could reach audiences. According to Le Potentiel, some venue owners and other influential figures expected to receive dedications and could threaten to exclude or boycott records that omitted them. Such practices reinforced the increasingly commercial character of libanga, which extended beyond expressions of friendship or appreciation to become a mechanism of exchange and influence. A dedication could serve simultaneously as advertising, patronage, networking, and a means of securing promotional exposure.

Artists did not all respond to this practice in the same way. Papa Wemba was positioned between the international "world music" scene and the more socially connected style of Kinshasa popular music. His 2001 album 100% Star Bakala Dia Kuba featured relatively few dedications and was well received by critics, but reportedly disappointed some Congolese listeners who were used to hearing more libanga. On his 2003 album, Somo trop, Wemba expanded his use of dedications, incorporating numerous names from the Congolese diaspora.

The practice soon spread outside of the two Congos, with artists in Cameroon, Côte d'Ivoire, Gabon, and elsewhere adopting similar forms of musical name dedication. Libanga transformed from being mainly a Congolese practice into a broader feature of African popular music, where dedications could also function as forms of recognition, patronage, and social exchange. This commercialization drew criticism from opponents who viewed paid dedications as a degradation—or, in some accounts, a "prostitution"—of musical art. Supporters and practitioners saw libanga as part of the social and economic relationships through which popular music operated. Wemba supported this idea and suggested that people who groaned about dedications might feel differently if their own names were someday included in a popular song.

One of the most prominent subjects of libanga was businessman Didi Kinuani, whose name appeared repeatedly in Congolese recordings. TPOK Jazz was reportedly the first band to mention him in a song, followed by Reddy Amisi, who referenced him in the 1996 song "Vérité kinwani" from the album Ziguy. His name subsequently appeared in the music of numerous artists, including Madilu System, Wenge Musica B.C.B.G under JB Mpiana, Koffi Olomidé, King Kester Emeneya, Wemba, Le Karmapa, and Bébé Tshanda. As the practice expanded, its subjects increasingly included figures from entertainment, business, media, politics, religion, and humanitarian organizations.

== Bibliography ==
- White, Bob W. (2008). Rumba Rules: The Politics of Dance Music in Mobutu's Zaire. Durham: Duke University Press. ISBN 978-0-8223-4091-1.
- "Congolese Pop Music". The Economist. 14 January 2017.
