= David Monsoh =

Ivorian record producer

- Born: David Amako Monsoh; June 26, 1973 (age 52); Agboville, Ivory Coast
- Occupation: Record producer
- Years active: 1990–present
- Labels: Obouo Productions
- Website: david.abidjansite.com

David Amako Monsoh (born June 26, 1973) is an Ivorian record producer and the founder of Obouo Productions, as well as the co-founder of Black in France and Africa. He has been involved in the production of works by various African musicians, including Nayanka Bell.

== Biography ==
David Monsoh was born on June 26, 1973, in Agboville, Ivory Coast. In the early 1990s, he relocated to France to continue his education, where he pursued studies in tourism and marketing.

During the 1990s, he also worked with the production company SLP film. Monsoh's entry into the music industry began with his collaboration with Ivorian singer Gadji Celi, producing Celi's album Espoir in 1994. Between 1994 and 2004, Monsoh served as the Director and Manager of the Paris distribution company Sono Disc, where he worked with artists such as Fally Ipupa, Koffi Olomide, and DJ Arafat.

In 2002, Monsoh established Obouo Productions, an audio and visual production company. He later became the founding president of BBlack television in Africa in 2003. Monsoh has also been involved in talent scouting, serving as the President of the Africa Island Talent Jury in 2014.

== Discography ==
=== Albums ===
Year	Albums	Artist
2003	Goudron noir	DJ Arafat
2003	La paix, c'est ce qui est ça	Gadji Celi
2005	Femmes	DJ Arafat
2005	Coupé Décalé : Mastiboulance	Boro Sanguy & Lino Versace
2005	La rénovation pays de joie	A Nous Les Petits
2005	Héros National Bouche Bée	Douk Saga
2007	Yorogang Vol. 2	Akwaba

== See also ==
- Magic System
- DJ Arafat
- Nayanka Bell
