= Ndombolo =

Congolese dance music genre

Members of Koffi Olomide's band Quartier Latin, notably Bouro Mpela (third from the left, first row) dancing the ndombolo in the 1998 music video for "Loi". This file has an invalid non-free use claim and may be deleted after Tuesday, 24 November 2026.

Ndombolo is a Congolese dance that emerged in Kinshasa in the mid-1990s. Initially, it was distinguished by a choreographic sequence accompanied by an animated shout, notably performed during the générique songs of Congolese rumba towards the end of the decade. The origin of ndombolo, its spread, and the identity of its main creators are the subject of debate among Congolese music critics, musicians, and witnesses of the time.

By extension, the term ndombolo has sometimes been used, particularly by international media, to refer to all Congolese dance rumba produced since the 1990s. However, this meaning remains contested by several actors in the Congolese music scene, for whom ndombolo is not an autonomous musical genre, but a popular dance.

== Etymology ==
The etymology of the word ndombolo remains poorly documented in written sources ("dwarf with broken legs", "monkey" and others) but several testimonies from actors in the Kinshasa music scene offer an interpretation.

According to guitarist Japonais Maladi, former member of Radja Kula's Station Japana, ndombolo is a slang term referring to a particularly potent variety of cannabis. This interpretation agrees with the accounts attributed to Alain Biongo, currently atalaku of Zaïko Langa Langa, who reports that the name originated during musical rehearsals of the local group Promise Musica where the state of energy and excitement shown by some dancers suggested, in a humorous tone, that it could be confused with that directly linked to the consumption of ndombolo.

== History ==
=== Emergence ===
The emergence of ndombolo occurred within a context of renewal of Congolese rumba choreographic practices in the mid-1990s. For decades, modern Congolese music had been accompanied by specific dances such as kwasa-kwasa, cavacha, madiaba, mayeno (mayebo), and various choreographies associated with the songs of popular orchestras. The emergence of ndombolo is part of this tradition of constant innovation in dance practices. Several accounts place its origins within Promise Musica, a musical group formed in Kinshasa in the late 1980s, which included Alpatchino (later a member of Chic Choc Loyenge), Mboshi Lipasa, Coréen Polystar, Alain Biongo, and, occasionally, Tutu Callugi, then a member of Wenge Musica.

=== Creation ===
According to the most frequently cited accounts, the first forms of ndombolo were collectively developed by Bouro Mpela, Séguin Mignon and Éric Ndombasi. These three artists reportedly devised a series of movements based on pronounced pelvic oscillations, rapid leg maneuvers, and various postures designed to enhance the physical expressiveness of the génériques (the instrumental, dance-oriented segments of a song).

Éric Ndombasi is sometimes credited with introducing certain initial movements, while Bouro Mpela is frequently associated with the development of a figure known as the "square" (équerre), a choreographic posture that creates a specific geometric body shape, which he himself described as resembling the structure of a table. His intention was also to mimic the postures of judokas, as well as those of a macaque monkey. Subsequently, this figure was enriched with several additional elements: 180-degree body rotations, undulating movements, sometimes referred to as the "snake", sequences inspired by urban dances performed by the youth of Kinshasa, and various adaptations tailored for stage performances.

The available accounts point toward a collective creative process, rather than attributing the dance exclusively to any single individual.

== Chant ==
One of the defining characteristics of ndombolo is the close connection between dance and the vocal interjections known as animations. According to several figures from that era, Alain Biongo was among the first to structure an animation centered on the repetition of the word ndombolo:

“Ndombolo eh! Ndombolo mama ndombolo!”

This phrase was intended to accompany the dancers during the générique. Some time later, Tutu Callugi reportedly introduced a more elaborate version, referencing various dances that had been successful in the traditional musical landscape, such as kebo and nzango, as well as dances that predated ndombolo, most notably kitisela, which was popularized by Radja Kula and his band, Station Japana:

“Ndombolo, eh, ndombolo ah ndombolo, kala tobinaki kebo na nzango, ah, kala tobina kitisela, tozonga na nzitutala, nzitu tambula malembe…”

The sequence in Lingala can be translated as follows:

“In the past, we used to dance kebo and nzango, ah! In the past, we used to dance kitisela…”

== Diffusion ==
The spread of ndombolo to the general public is associated with its introduction within the group Wenge Musica in 1996 by Bouro Mpela, brother of the band's singer, Alain Mpela, and Souzy Versace. Tutu Callugi, a member of the band since 1993, presented his own evolved version of the animation (vocal and dance-based performance style) there, while the group's popularity helped ensure widespread visibility for the dance.

From that point on, ndombolo was gradually adopted by numerous other Congolese ensembles, including Defao's Big Stars, Zaïko Langa Langa (on the album Backline Lesson One), and Empire Bakuba (on Merci Maman and Full Option). The success of the track "Ndombolo", featured on JB Mpiana's 1997 album Feux de l'amour and driven by Callugi's animation, played a major role in cementing the term within the Congolese musical landscape.

Meanwhile, Mboshi Lipasa and Bouro Mpela, having joined Quartier Latin International, introduced the dance to that group as well. The track "Loi," released on Koffi Olomide's album of the same name in November 1997, propelled ndombolo onto the international stage. Each orchestra developed its own unique adaptations, incorporating ndombolo into its specific choreographic repertoire and animation manners.

Other artists, however, chose not to adopt the dance. Papa Wemba, in particular, remained committed to the choreographies developed within his own ensembles, favoring original, bespoke creations over the systematic integration of popular trends.

== Paternity dispute ==
The origins of ndombolo remain a subject of debate among specialized music commentators. Tutu Callugi is frequently cited as its primary popularizer, given his role in developing the animation within the group Wenge Musica. Japonais Maladi attributes the creation of the dance to the group Station Japana, led by Radja Kula. Bouro Mpela is widely recognized for his contribution to developing several dance moves that have since become iconic, moves for which he has proclaimed himself "the king". Éric Ndombasi, Séguin Mignon, Alino Biongo, and Mboshi Lipasa are also credited with participating in its creation.

The lack of written sources directly from those involved makes it difficult to establish a definitive chronology. Consequently, the history of ndombolo relies primarily on oral accounts gathered from the musicians who were its key protagonists.

== Influence ==
The success of ndombolo profoundly transformed the choreographic practices associated with Congolese rumba, beginning in the second half of the 1990s. Its rise contributed, albeit unofficially, to a decline in the visibility of soukous, a subgenre of Congolese rumba.

Artists associated with soukous, such as Aurlus Mabélé, Dany Engobo, and other Congolese musicians based in Central Africa or Europe, gradually incorporated certain ndombolo-derived choreographic practices into their own work.
