= Lloyd Banks discography =

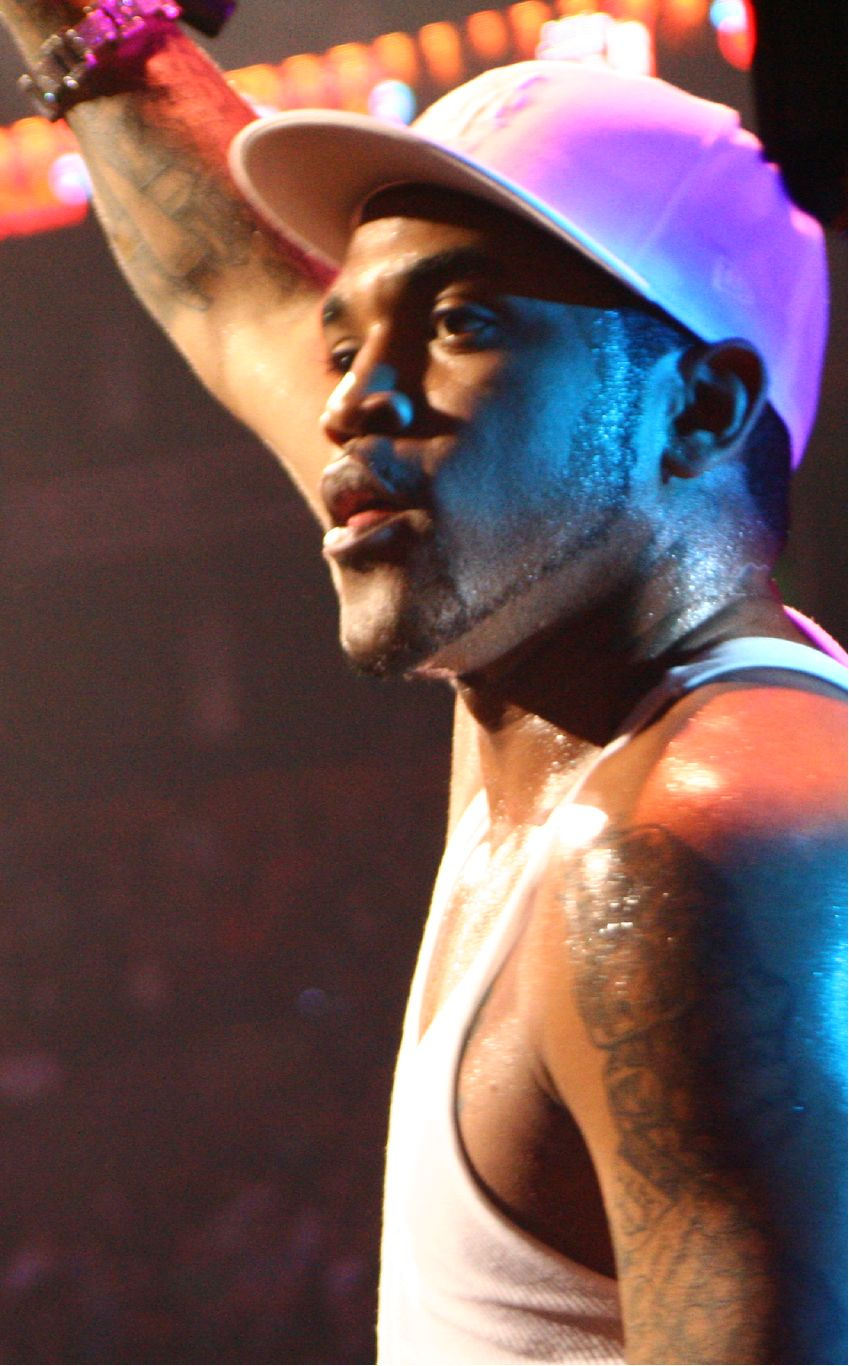
- Banks performing in 2006
- Studio albums: 6
- Singles: 19
- Music videos: 13
- Mixtapes: 23

The discography of Lloyd Banks, an American rapper, consists of six studio albums, twenty-three mixtapes, nineteen singles and one soundtrack. His music has been released on the record labels Interscope Records and 50 Cent's G-Unit Records.

== Albums ==
=== Studio albums ===
List of studio albums, with selected chart positions, sales figures and certifications
| Title | Album details | Peak chart positions | | | | | | | | | | Sales | Certifications |
| Title | Album details | US | US R&B | US Rap | CAN | FRA | GER | IRE | NLD | SWI | UK | Sales | Certifications |
|---|---|---|---|---|---|---|---|---|---|---|---|---|---|
| The Hunger for More | Released: June 29, 2004; Label: G-Unit, Interscope; Format: CD, LP, cassette, digital download | 1 | 1 | 1 | 2 | 37 | 45 | 36 | 52 | 65 | 15 | US: 1,500,000 | RIAA: Platinum; BPI: Gold; MC: Platinum |
| Rotten Apple | Released: October 10, 2006; Label: G-Unit, Interscope; Format: CD, LP, cassette, digital download | 3 | 1 | 1 | 6 | 65 | 51 | 27 | — | 36 | 40 | US: 351,000 | MC: Gold |
| H.F.M. 2 (The Hunger for More 2) | Released: November 22, 2010; Label: G-Unit, EMI; Format: CD, digital download | 26 | 6 | 4 | 60 | — | — | — | — | — | — | US: 82,000 | |
| The Course of the Inevitable | Released: June 4, 2021; Label: Money by Any Means, Empire; Format: CD, LP, digital download | 84 | 45 | — | — | — | — | — | — | — | — | | |
| The Course of the Inevitable 2 | Released: July 15, 2022; Label: Money by Any Means, Empire; Format: CD, LP, digital download | — | — | — | — | — | — | — | — | — | — | | |
| The Course of the Inevitable III: Pieces of My Pain | Released: April 21, 2023; Label: Money by Any Means, Empire; Format: CD, LP, digital download | — | — | — | — | — | — | — | — | — | — | | |
"—" denotes a recording that did not chart or was not released in that territory.

== Mixtapes ==
| Title | Mixtape details |
|---|---|
| Money in the Bank | Released: June 17, 2003; Format: Free download |
| Mo Money in the Bank | Released: October 8, 2003; Format: Free download |
| Cashing in Mo Money in the Bank, Pt. 3 | Released: September 19, 2004; Format: Free download |
| Mo' Money in the Bank, Pt. 4: Gang Green Season Starts Now | Released: May 27, 2006; Format: Free download |
| Mo' Money in the Bank, Pt. 5: Gang Green Season Continues (The Final Chapter) | Released: December 18, 2006; Format: Free download |
| The Return of the Plk | Released: September 26, 2008; Format: Free download |
| 5 and Better Series Vol. 2: Halloween Havoc | Released: October 31, 2008; Format: Free download |
| The Cold Corner | Released: January 1, 2009; Format: Free download |
| 5 and Better Series Vol. 4: 4-30-09 (Happy Birthday) | Released: April 30, 2009; Format: Free download |
| V. 5 | Released: December 28, 2009; Format: Free download |
| The Cold Corner 2 | Released: November 8, 2011; Format: Free download |
| V.6: The Gift | Released: July 24, 2012; Format: Free download |
| A.O.N. (All Or Nothing) Series Vol. 1: F.N.O. (Failure's No Option) | Released: October 31, 2013; Format: Free download |
| Halloween Havoc 2 | Released: November 1, 2015; Format: Free download |
| A.O.N. (All Or Nothing) Series Vol. 2: L.I.U. (Live It Up) | Released: September 25, 2016; Format: Free download |
| Halloween Havoc 3: Four Days of Fury | Released: October 31, 2016; Format: Free download |
| Blue Friday Series | Released: November 26, 2016; Format: Free download |
| Respect My Name | Released: March 16, 2018; Format: Free download |
| Halloween Havoc IV: The 72nd Hr | Released: October 31, 2023; Format: Digital download, streaming |
| Halloween Havoc V | Released: October 31, 2024; Format: Digital download, streaming |
| A.O.N. 3: DESPITE MY MISTAKES | Released: April 30, 2025; Format: Digital download, streaming |
| At Your Request Vol. 2 | Released: August 27, 2025; Format: Digital download, streaming |
| HHVI THE SIX OF SWORDS | Released: October 31, 2025; Format: Digital download, streaming |

== Singles ==
=== As lead artist ===
List of singles, with selected chart positions and certifications, showing year released and album name
| Title | Year | Peak chart positions | | | | | | | | | Certifications | Album |
| Title | Year | US | US R&B | US Rap | AUS | GER | IRL | NL | SWI | UK | Certifications | Album |
|---|---|---|---|---|---|---|---|---|---|---|---|---|
| "On Fire" | 2004 | 8 | 4 | 2 | 44 | 36 | 25 | 45 | 18 | 19 | RIAA: Gold; BPI: Silver | The Hunger for More |
| "I'm So Fly" | 2004 | 102 | 32 | 21 | — | — | — | — | — | — | | The Hunger for More |
| "Karma" (featuring Avant) | 2004 | 17 | 9 | 6 | — | — | — | — | — | — | | The Hunger for More |
| "Hands Up" (featuring 50 Cent) | 2006 | 84 | 30 | 12 | — | 20 | 26 | — | — | 43 | | Rotten Apple |
| "Cake" (featuring 50 Cent) | 2006 | — | 65 | — | — | — | — | — | — | — | | Rotten Apple |
| "Help" (featuring Keri Hilson) | 2006 | — | 77 | — | — | — | — | — | — | — | | Rotten Apple |
| "You Don't Know" (with Eminem, 50 Cent and Cashis) | 2006 | 12 | 87 | 32 | — | — | 5 | — | — | 32 | RIAA: Platinum; ARIA: Gold; BPI: Gold | Eminem Presents: The Re-Up |
| "Beamer, Benz, or Bentley" (featuring Juelz Santana) | 2010 | 49 | 15 | 3 | — | — | — | — | — | — | RIAA: Gold | H.F.M. (Hunger for More 2) |
| "Any Girl" (featuring Lloyd) | 2010 | — | 52 | 24 | — | — | — | — | — | — | | H.F.M. (Hunger for More 2) |
| "Start It Up" (featuring Kanye West, Swizz Beatz, Ryan Leslie and Fabolous) | 2010 | 105 | 52 | 20 | — | — | — | — | — | — | | H.F.M. (Hunger for More 2) |
| "I Don't Deserve You" (featuring Jeremih) | 2011 | 120 | 33 | 19 | — | — | — | — | — | — | | H.F.M. (Hunger for More 2) |
| "So Forgetful" (featuring Ryan Leslie) | 2011 | — | — | — | — | — | — | — | — | — | | H.F.M. (Hunger for More 2) |
"—" denotes a recording that did not chart or was not released in that territory.

=== As featured artist ===
List of singles, with selected chart positions and certifications, showing year released and album name
| Title | Year | Peak chart positions | | | | | | | | Certifications | Album |
| Title | Year | US | US R&B | US Rap | AUS | CAN | IRE | NZ | UK | Certifications | Album |
|---|---|---|---|---|---|---|---|---|---|---|---|
| "P.I.M.P." (Remix) (50 Cent featuring Snoop Dogg, Lloyd Banks and Young Buck) | 2003 | 3 | 2 | 1 | 2 | 18 | 4 | 2 | 5 | RIAA: Gold; ARIA: Platinum; RIANZ: Gold | Get Rich or Die Tryin' |
| "Twist It" (Olivia featuring Lloyd Banks) | 2005 | — | 114 | — | — | — | — | — | — | | Behind Closed Doors |
| "Touch It [Remix]" (Busta Rhymes featuring Mary J. Blige, Rah Digga, Missy Elliott, Lloyd Banks, Papoose and DMX) | 2005 | — | — | — | — | — | — | — | — | | Non-album single |
| "Speak My Language" (Nipsey Hussle featuring Lloyd Banks, Cory Gunz and June Summers) | 2009 | — | — | — | — | — | — | — | — | | Bullets Ain't Got No Name Vol.3 |
| "Remember the Titans" (Joe Budden featuring Fabolous, Lloyd Banks and Royce da 5'9") | 2010 | — | — | — | — | — | — | — | — | | Mood Muzik Vol. 4 |
| "Life We Chose" (Havoc featuring Lloyd Banks) | 2013 | — | — | — | — | — | — | — | — | | 13 |
| "Respect the Jux (Remix)" (Vado featuring Dave East and Lloyd Banks) | 2021 | — | — | — | — | — | — | — | — | | Long Run, Vol. 2 |
"—" denotes a recording that did not chart or was not released in that territory.

=== Promotional singles ===
List of singles, showing year released and album name
| Title | Year | Album |
|---|---|---|
| "Officer Down" | 2009 | 4.30.09: Happy Birthday |
| "Love Me in the Hood" | 2011 | Cold Corner 2 |

== Other charted songs ==
List of songs, with selected chart positions, showing year released and album name
| Title | Year | Peak chart positions | Album |
| Title | Year | US R&B | Album |
|---|---|---|---|
| "Victory 2004" (with 50 Cent, P. Diddy, The Notorious B.I.G. and Busta Rhymes) | 2004 | 61 | Bad Boy's 10th Anniversary... The Hits |
| "Warrior" | 2004 | 110 | The Hunger for More |
| "My House" | 2005 | 124 | Non-album song |

== Guest appearances ==
List of songs with guest appearances from Lloyd Banks, showing other performing artists, year released and album name
| Title | Year | Artist(s) | Album |
|---|---|---|---|
| "Don't Push Me" | 2003 | 50 Cent, Eminem | Get Rich or Die Tryin' |
| "Why You Gotta Look So Good?" | 2003 | Mýa | Moodring |
| "Victory 2004" | 2004 | P. Diddy, Notorious B.I.G., Busta Rhymes, 50 Cent | Bad Boy's 10th Anniversary... The Hits |
| "Prices on My Head" | 2004 | Young Buck, D-Tay | Straight Outta Cashville |
| "Feds Coming" | 2005 | Young Buck | Welcome to the Hood |
| "We're Back" | 2005 | Young Buck | Welcome to the Hood |
| "Thuggin Til I'm Gone" | 2005 | Young Buck | Back to Business (G-Unit Radio Part 14) |
| "We Don't Give a Fuck" | 2005 | Tony Yayo, 50 Cent, Olivia | Thoughts of a Predicate Felon |
| "Things Change" | 2005 | Spider Loc, 50 Cent | Get Rich or Die Tryin' (soundtrack) |
| "You Already Know" | 2005 | 50 Cent, Young Buck | Get Rich or Die Tryin' (soundtrack) |
| "Get Low" | 2005 | —N/a | Get Rich or Die Tryin' (soundtrack) |
| "Born Alone, Die Alone" | 2005 | —N/a | Get Rich or Die Tryin' (soundtrack) |
| "I Don't Know Officer" | 2005 | 50 Cent, Spider Loc, Prodigy, Ma$e | Get Rich or Die Tryin' (soundtrack) |
| "NYC Is Where I'm From" | 2005 | Tony Yayo | Raw and Uncut (G-Unit Radio Part 11) |
| "G-Unit Gang" | 2005 | Tony Yayo, 50 Cent, Young Buck | Raw and Uncut (G-Unit Radio Part 11) |
| "Hate It Or Love It G-Unit Remix" | 2005 | 50 Cent, The Game, Tony Yayo, Young Buck | The Massacre |
| "Slowdown" | 2005 | Olivia | So Seductive (G-Unit Radio Part 12) |
| "Stole Something" | 2006 | Mobb Deep | Blood Money |
| "Exclusive" | 2006 | Avant | Director |
| "Playboy" | 2006 | Ras Kass | Eat or Die |
| "Work It Out" | 2007 | Hot Rod | —N/a |
| "My Bandana" | 2009 | Maino | Unstoppable |
| "FlatLine" | 2009 | Young Chris | —N/a |
| "Men of Respect" | 2010 | DJ Kayslay, Rell, Tony Yayo, Papoose, Jim Jones | More Than Just a DJ |
| "Standing on Couches" | 2010 | DJ Self, Jim Jones, Lil' Kim | —N/a |
| "Christian Dior Denim Flow" | 2010 | Kanye West, Kid Cudi, Ryan Leslie, Pusha T, John Legend | GOOD Fridays |
| "I'm Ill Pt 3" | 2010 | Red Café, Jadakiss, Fabolous, Lore'l | No Witness |
| "Forever" | 2010 | Lloyd | —N/a |
| "Zoooovie" | 2010 | Reek Da Villian | The Gift |
| "Last Train to Scotland" | 2011 | Raekwon | Shaolin vs. Wu-Tang |
| "Hummin'" | 2011 | Bobby V | Fly on the Wall |
| "Miana" | 2011 | Ca$his, Mitchy Slick, Marty James, K-Young | Euthanasia LP |
| "Take a Bow" | 2011 | Jim Jones, Prodigy, Sen City | Capo |
| "Champion" | 2011 | DJ Suss One, Floyd Mayweather, Junior Reed, Jadakiss, French Montana | —N/a |
| "The Realest" | 2011 | Fabolous, Red Café | Above the Cloudz |
| "What Chu Talkin Bout (Remix)" | 2011 | Oun-P, Jadakiss, Fred the Godson | —N/a |
| "Mo Brooklyn, Mo Harlem, Mo Southside" | 2011 | Fabolous, Vado | The S.O.U.L. Tape |
| "We Don't Play" | 2011 | Styles P | Master of Ceremonies |
| "Get Down or Lay Down" | 2011 | Fabolous | There Is No Competition 3: Death Comes in 3's |
| "E.T. Bars" | 2011 | Crooked I | —N/a |
| "Yeah Yeah" | 2012 | Bow Wow | —N/a |
| "Yes Yes Y'all" | 2012 | Maino | The Day After Tomorrow |
| "Get It Poppin'" | 2012 | Gilbere Forte | YOTD (Year of the Dragon) |
| "Respect It" | 2012 | Jadakiss, Fabolous | Consignment |
| "Presidential" | 2012 | Trav, Jim Jones | Push |
| "Turn It Up" | 2013 | Juelz Santana | God Will'n |
| "Last Day" | 2013 | Joe Budden, Juicy J | No Love Lost |
| "Get Involved" | 2013 | Funkmaster Flex | Who You Mad At? Me or Yourself? |
| "Life We Chose" | 2013 | Havoc | 13 |
| "Strictly 4 My Jeeps" (Remix) | 2013 | Action Bronson, LL Cool J | —N/a |
| "Selling Keys" | 2013 | Tony Yayo | Godfather of the Ghetto |
| "The Town" | 2013 | Vado, Maino | Slime Flu 4 |
| "Your Style" | 2013 | Troy Ave | White Christmas 2 |
| "Exclusive" | 2015 | Young Buck, Yo Gotti, Lil Reese | Before the Beast |
| "The Remainder" | 2015 | DJ Kay Slay | Shadow of the Sun |
| "Yeah It Is" | 2015 | Vado | Slime Flu 5 |
| "Lee TV" | 2017 | Vado | Sinatra 2 |
| "Bullet Club" | 2017 | Conway the Machine, Benny the Butcher | G.O.A.T. |
| "Regulate" | 2017 | DJ Kay Slay, Jadakiss, Joell Ortiz, Meet Sims | The Big Brother |
| "Violent" | 2018 | Dave East | Paranoia 2 |
| "Juvenile Hell" | 2020 | Conway the Machine, Havoc, Flee Lord | From King to a GOD |
| "Element of Surprise" | 2021 | —N/a | Conflicted (Original Motion Picture Soundtrack) |
| "It's Alright" | 2021 | Vado, Shemon Luster | —N/a |
| "Get It" | 2021 | Russ, Cyhi the Prynce | Chomp 2 |
| "Grand Scheme" | 2022 | Cormega | The Realness II |
| "Plain Sight" | 2022 | Vado | Long Run Vol. 3 |
| "Broken Record" | 2022 | Vado | Long Run Vol. 3 |
| "Rocket Champer" | 2023 | Tony Yayo | The Loyal |

== Remixes ==
| Year | Song | Artist(s) | Album |
|---|---|---|---|
| 2003 | "The Setup" (Remix) | Obie Trice, Redman, Jadakiss, Nate Dogg | —N/a |
| 2005 | "Window Shopper" (Remix) | 50 Cent, Mase | —N/a |
| 2005 | "Hate It or Love It" (Remix) | 50 Cent, The Game, Tony Yayo, Young Buck | The Massacre |
| 2006 | "Touch It" (Remix) | Busta Rhymes, Mary J. Blige, Rah Digga, Missy Elliott, Papoose, DMX | —N/a |
| 2009 | "Hottest In the Hood" (Remix) | Red Café, Busta Rhymes, Juelz Santana, Diddy | Redoctober |
| 2009 | "You Heard of Us" (Remix) | DJ Kay Slay, Papoose, Jadakiss, Styles P, Sheek Louch, Bun B, Tony Yayo, Ray J | —N/a |
| 2009 | "Million Bucks" (Remix) | Maino, Swizz Beatz | —N/a |
| 2009 | "Love Come Down" (Remix) | Diddy – Dirty Money | —N/a |
| 2009 | "Ride the Wave" (Remix) | Trav, Juelz Santana | —N/a |
| 2009 | "Pretty Brown" (Remix) | Ameriie, Trey Songz | —N/a |
| 2010 | "I'm Ill" (Remix) | Red Café, Ryan Leslie, Claudette Ortiz | —N/a |
| 2010 | "Un-Thinkable (I'm Ready)" (Remix) | Alicia Keys | —N/a |
| 2010 | "All I Want Is You" (Remix) | Miguel, J. Cole | —N/a |
| 2010 | "Holding You Down (Goin' In Circles)" (Remix) | Jazmine Sullivan | —N/a |
| 2011 | "Shot Caller" (Remix) | French Montana, Chinx Drugz, Tony Yayo | Coke Boys Run NY |

== Music videos ==
List of music videos, with directors, showing year released
| Title | Year | Director(s) |
|---|---|---|
| "On Fire" | 2004 | Jessy Terrero |
| "I'm So Fly" | 2004 | Jessy Terrero |
| "Karma" | 2004 | Little X |
| "Hands Up" | 2006 | Jessy Terrero |
| "Help" | 2006 | Melina |
| "The Cake" | 2006 | |
| "Beamer, Benz, or Bentley" | 2010 | Broadway |
| "Any Girl" | 2010 | J. Jesse Smith |
| "I Don't Deserve You" | 2011 | Parris |
| "So Forgetful" | 2011 | Armen Djerrahian |
| "Home Sweet Home" | 2011 | Mike Carson & Mike Waxx |
| "Angel Dust" | 2016 | Eif Rivera |
| "Money Over Matter" | 2016 | Eif Rivera |
