= Young Gunz discography =

This is the discography of American rap duo Young Gunz.

== Albums ==
=== Studio albums ===
List of albums, with selected chart positions
Title	Album details	Peak chart positions		
Title	Album details	US	US R&B	US Rap
Tough Luv	Released: February 24, 2004; Label: Roc-A-Fella, Def Jam; Format: CD, LP, digital download	3	1	—
Brothers from Another	Released: May 24, 2005; Label: Roc-A-Fella, Def Jam; Format: CD, LP, digital download	15	4	2
"—" denotes a recording that did not chart.

=== Mixtapes ===
Year	Title
2003	Youngest in Charge Vol.1: Released: December 12, 2003; Label: Roc-A-Fella; Format: CD
2004	Get In Where You Fit In: Released: November 30, 2004; Label: Young Gunz; Format: CD
2005	Get In Where U Fit In, Pt. 2: Released: August 30, 2005; Label: Traffic; Format: CD
2008	Rapid Fire: Released: January 29, 2008; Label: Young Gunz; Format: CD
2010	Back to Business: Released: July 23, 2010; Label: Young Gunz; Format: CD, Digital Download

== Singles ==
List of singles, with selected chart positions, showing year released and album name
Title	Year	Peak chart positions			Album
Title	Year	US	US R&B	US Rap	Album
"Can't Stop, Won't Stop"	2003	14	10	6	The Chain Gang Vol. 2
"No Better Love" (featuring Rell)	2004	36	15	11	Tough Luv
"Friday Night"	2004	115	44	21	Tough Luv
"Set It Off" (featuring Swizz Beatz)	2005	—	52	—	Brothers from Another
"Don't Keep Me Waiting (Come Back Soon)" (featuring Slim)	2005	—	121	—	Brothers from Another
"—" denotes a recording that did not chart.

== Music videos ==
List of music videos, with directors, showing year released
Title	Year	Director(s)
"Can't Stop, Won't Stop"	2003	Fat Cats
"No Better Love"	2004	Darren Grant
"Friday Night"	2004	Bernard Gourley, Neef Buck

== See also ==
- State Property discography
