= V.6: The Gift =

Mixtape by Lloyd Banks
- Released: July 24, 2012
- Recorded: 2011–2012
- Genre: East Coast hip hop, hardcore hip hop, gangsta rap
- Label: G-Unit Records
- Producer: Automatik; Doe Pesci; Superiors; A6; V Don; Beat Butcha; Tha Jerm; Cardiak

Lloyd Banks chronology
The Cold Corner 2 (2011)	V.6: The Gift (2012)	A.O.N. (All Or Nothing) Series Vol. 1: F.N.O. (Failure's No Option) (2013)

Singles from V.6: The Gift
- 1. "Open Arms" Released: March 30, 2012

Professional ratings
Review scores
Source	Rating
XXL	4/5 stars

V.6: The Gift, the twelfth mixtape by American rapper Lloyd Banks, was released on July 24, 2012 for free download. The mixtape features confirmed guest appearances from Young Chris, Vado, Fabolous, Jadakiss and Schoolboy Q. It also includes production from Automatik, Doe Pesci, Superiors, A6, V Don, Beat Butcher, Tha Jerm and Cardiak.

== Background ==
The name was inspired by his tenth mixtape, V.5 released on December 28, 2009 with DJ Whoo Kid also a member of G-Unit. The first date for release of the mixtape was on his birthday April 30, 2012. However, it was pushed back with no definite release date. On July 16, 2012 the site DatPiff announced the new release date would be July 24, 2012. The site is the same where Banks would provide the mixtape for free download. On the last track, the rapper announced a new mixtape with DJ Drama of his Gangsta Grillz series. The tape was confirmed to be Failure's No Option, the first volume of the All or Nothing series, which was released on October 31, 2013. As of now, V.6 has over 250k downloads on DatPiff, certifying the mixtape platinum on that site.

== Singles ==
On March 29, 2012, Lloyd Banks released the first official song of the mixtape via his YouTube account. The song, Open Arms, was released later as single at iTunes on March 30, 2012. It was produced by the G-Unit's production team member Doe Pesci.

== Track listing ==
No.	Title	Writer(s)	Producer(s)	Length
1.	"Rise from the Dirt (Intro)"	Christopher Lloyd	Automatik	3:22
2.	"City of Sin" (featuring Young Chris)	Lloyd, Christopher Ries	Doe Pesci	4:18
3.	"The Sprint"	Lloyd	Superiors	3:18
4.	"Open Arms"	Lloyd	Doe Pesci	2:47
5.	"We Run the Town" (with Vado)	Lloyd, Teyon Winfree	Automatik	2:57
6.	"Protocol"	Lloyd	A6	3:43
7.	"Can She Live?"	Lloyd	V Don	3:00
8.	"Bring It Back" (featuring Fabolous)	Lloyd, John Jackson	A6	4:46
9.	"Chosen Few" (featuring Jadakiss)	Lloyd, Jason Phillips	Beat Butcha	4:35
10.	"Gettin' By" (featuring Schoolboy Q)	Lloyd, Quincy Hanley	The Jerm	3:58
11.	"Live It Up"	Lloyd	Cardiak	3:06
12.	"Money Don't Matter"	Lloyd	Beat Butcher	3:04
13.	"Hate You More"	Lloyd	The Jerm	3:23
14.	"Show and Prove"	Lloyd	Cardiak	2:49
15.	"Terror Dome"	Lloyd	Doe Pesci	2:58
Total length:				51:49
