= The Cold Corner 2 =

Mixtape by Lloyd Banks
- Released: November 8, 2011
- Recorded: 2010–2011
- Genres: East Coast hip hop, hardcore hip hop, gangsta rap
- Label: G-Unit Records
- Producers: Doe Pesci, AraabMuzik, Beat Butcha, G Sparkz, Beat Nick Speed, Dot & Pro, DJ Excellence

Lloyd Banks chronology
V.5 (2009)	The Cold Corner 2 (2011)	V.6: The Gift (2012)

The Cold Corner 2 is the eleventh mixtape by American rapper Lloyd Banks. It was released on November 8, 2011, for free download. The mixtape features confirmed guest appearances from Prodigy, Styles P and ASAP Rocky. It also includes production from Automatik, Doe Pesci, AraabMuzik, G Sparkz, Beat Butcha, The Jerm, Nick Speed, Dot & Pro and DJ Excellence.

== Background ==
The name was inspired from his eight mixtape, The Cold Corner, released on January 1, 2009.

== Track listing ==
No.	Title	Producer(s)	Length
1.	"1, 2, 3 Grind" (featuring Prodigy)	AraabMuzik	4:21
2.	"Super Crack"	Beat Butcha	3:35
3.	"Shock the World"	Automatik	3:04
4.	"Predator" (featuring Styles P)	Tha Jerm	4:49
5.	"The Pulse"	The Insurgency	2:38
6.	"Make It Stack" (featuring ASAP Rocky)	Doe Pesci	4:44
7.	"Score"	Doe Pesci	3:30
8.	"We Fuckin"	Doe Pesci	3:19
9.	"Love Shots"	Nick Speed	2:53
10.	"Jokes on You"	Doe Pesci	4:43
11.	"Young Fly Flashy"	Dot & Pro	3:06
12.	"Ice Box Pt2"	G Sparkz	3:20
13.	"No Love"	The Jerm	4:57
14.	"Cashin In"	Tha Jerm	4:09
15.	"Cold Corner 2 (Eyes Wide)"	Nick Speed	3:24
16.	"Keep Your Cool"	The Jerm	2:23
17.	"Get It How I Live"	The Jerm	3:33
