= Rapid Fire =

Rapid Fire may refer to:

== Fictional character ==
- Rapid Fire (G.I. Joe), a fictional character in the G.I. Joe universe

== Film ==
- Rapid Fire (1989 film), a 1989 American action film by David A. Prior
- Rapid Fire (1992 film), a 1992 American action film starring Brandon Lee
- Rapid Fire (2006 film), a 2006 action television film

== Music ==
- Rapidfire, a pre-Guns N' Roses band featuring Axl Rose
- Rapid Fire (mixtape), a mixtape by Young Gunz
- "Rapid Fire", a song by Judas Priest from the album British Steel
