= Young Chris =

American rapper

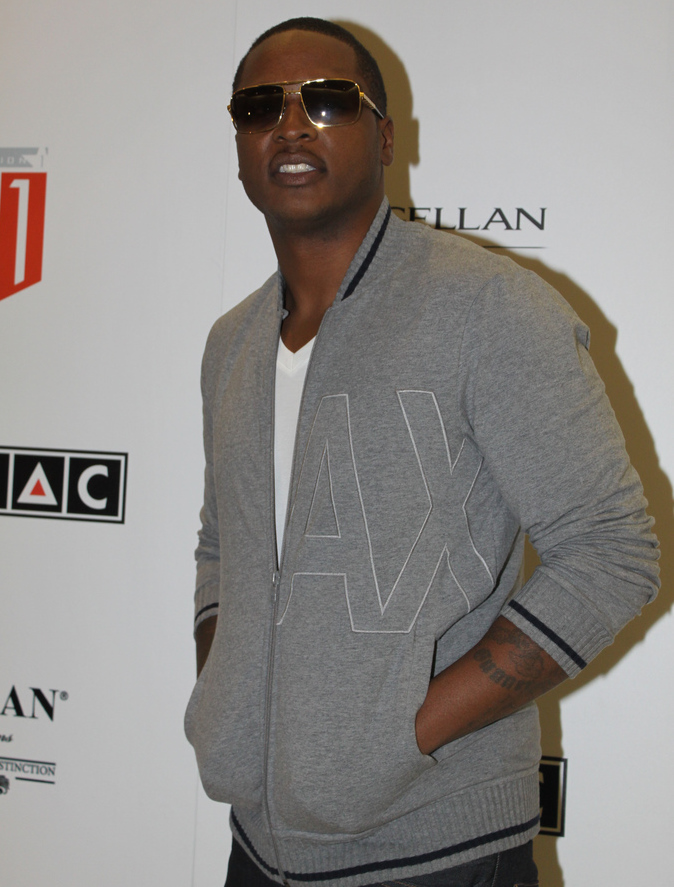
- Young Chris in 2010

Background information
- Born: Christopher Francis Ries; March 9, 1983 (age 43); North Philadelphia, Pennsylvania, U.S.
- Genres: East Coast hip-hop
- Occupations: Rapper; songwriter
- Years active: 1999–present
- Labels: E1; Division1
- Member of: State Property; Young Gunz

Christopher Francis Ries (born March 9, 1983), known professionally as Young Chris, is an American rapper. He was one-half of the Philadelphia-based hip hop duo Young Gunz, which he formed with fellow rapper Neef Buck in 2001. That same year, the duo joined the larger Philadelphia-based hip hop group State Property; both acts were signed to Jay-Z's Roc-A-Fella Records by the same time.

With Young Gunz, the duo saw their furthest success with their 2003 debut single "Can't Stop, Won't Stop", which peaked at number 16 on the Billboard Hot 100 and was nominated for Best Rap Performance by a Duo or Group at the 2004 Grammy Awards. The duo subsequently released two albums: Tough Luv (2004) and Brothers from Another (2005). After long-term delay for his debut solo record, Ries signed with Rico Love's record label Division1, an imprint of Universal Motown Records in December 2010. He has since released two studio albums through the label: LIFE: Ladies In For Free and The Revival, both in 2011.

Ries is often disambiguated with the rapper YC, who used to perform as "Yung Chris", and is thus sometimes incorrectly credited as the performer of the YC song "Racks."

== Music career ==
=== Young Gunz ===
Young Chris and Neef Buck (born Hanif Muhammad) had been friends since they were young boys on the block (Gratz and Wingohocking). On "Takeover", a track from his 2001 album The Blueprint, Jay-Z announced the duo as "Chris & Neef". In 2001, the duo performed on the State Property soundtrack album. Young Chris and Young Neef also starred in the 2002 titular film in cameo appearances. Also during this period of their career, Young Chris appeared throughout Dame Dash's Dream Team compilation, and Beanie Sigel's The Reason. The duo performed in tandem on guest appearances for albums like Jay-Z's The Blueprint 2, Freeway's Philadelphia Freeway, State Property's The Chain Gang Vol. 2, and Memphis Bleek's M.A.D.E.; all while recording their album. The Young Gunz scored their first hit with "Can't Stop, Won't Stop", the lead single from The Chain Gang Vol. 2 album. Its video received major airplay on hip-hop radio, MTV2, and BET and reached No. 14 on the U.S. Billboard 200 chart and #6 on the Billboard Hot Rap Tracks chart.

After the success of their single, "Can't Stop, Won't Stop", the duo began preparing to release their debut album, Tough Luv (2004). It included the remix to "Can't Stop, Won't Stop", which featured St. Louis rapper Chingy. Singles included "No Better Love" featuring former Roc-A-Fella Records crooner Rell and the Just Blaze-produced "Friday Night". Tough Luv debuted on the Billboard 200 at No. 3 after selling 128,000 copies in its first week. That week, the album at No. 2 was labelmate Kanye West's debut album The College Dropout, which was released just two weeks earlier.

After a brief hiatus, the duo returned with Swizz Beatz produced "Set It Off" from their second album, Brothers from Another. It was the second release from the "new" Roc-A-Fella Records, referencing when Jay-Z became president of Def Jam Records, the first being Memphis Bleek's 534. The album debuted on the Billboard 200 at No. 15, and included guest features from Kanye West, Swizz Beatz, Slim of 112 and John Legend.

=== Solo career ===
As early as March 2006, Young Chris thought about recording a solo album. He initially titled it Now or Never. He stated to XXL magazine that he wanted to release a solo album by the end of 2008 and had been "95 percent done" by June 2008. In this article, Young Chris also states that he himself up there with Lil' Wayne and Juelz Santana. Since this time, Chris has taken to the internet to solidify himself as a top solo artist, with his YoungChris.com Social Network, hitting the remix circuit, and his much anticipated "The Network" Mixtape series, hosted by DJ Don Cannon.

In December 2010, Young Chris signed with Division1, a label started by songwriter/producer Rico Love, under the Universal Motown umbrella. Love considers Young Chris his flagship artist, working closely with Young Chris on his debut album and pre-album/mixtape. The mixtape, called "The Re-Introduction", was released on November 20, 2010. The aptly titled mixtape gives the spotlight to a newly signed Young Chris, as a solo artist, and also, re-introduces the combination of DJ Drama and Don Cannon, the former "Affiliates" partners, hosting their first mixtape together, in several years.

On January 28, a song called "Philly Shit (Mega Mix)" featuring Young Chris, Eve, Black Thought, Money Malc, Fat Joe, Fred the Godson, Diggy Simmons, Jermaine Dupri and The Game was leaked. On March 22, 2011, Young Chris' single "A$$ets" was commercially released.

In late 2013–2014, Young Chris began releasing a slew of freestyles, the latest being a reworking of Wale's "LoveHate Thing", released on May 6. He's currently working on a new studio album titled Alive.

On May 6, 2014, he released a mixtape on Datpiff called Gunna Seazon.

== Awards and nominations ==
"Can't Stop, Won't Stop" was nominated for Best Rap Performance by a Duo or Group at the 46th Annual Grammy Awards.

== Discography ==
This is the singles and albums discography of Young Chris.

=== Young Chris ===
- Young Chris (2007)
- Killadelphia – More Bodies Than Days (2007)
- Hired Gun (2007)
- Murder Capital (with Pooda Brown, Neef Buck and DJ LRM) (2007)
- Politically Incorrect (2007)
- The Newprint (2007)
- Young Chris-Mas (2007)
- Now or Never (with DJ Drama) (2008)
- Campaign for Change (2008)
- The Network (with Don Cannon) (2009)
- 30 Days 30 Verses (2009)
- The Network 2 (2010)
- The Re-Introduction (2010)
- L.I.F.E (Ladies in for Free) (2011)
- The Revival (2011)
- Young Christmas (FrEP) (2011)
- Vital Signs EP (2013)
- Gunna Season (2014)
- The Network 3 (2014)

=== Young Gunz ===
- Tough Luv (2004)
- Brothers from Another (2005)
- Get In Where U Fit In (2004)
- Get In Where U Fit In Part 2 (2005)
- Rapid Fire (2008)
- Back to Business (2010)

=== State Property ===
- State Property (2002)
- The Chain Gang Vol. 2 (2003)

=== Mixtapes ===
List of extended plays, with selected chart positions and certifications
| Title | Album details | Peak chart positions | | |
| Title | Album details | US | US R&B | US Rap |
|---|---|---|---|---|
| Killadelphia: More Bodies Than Days | Released: February 2, 2007; Label: Self-released; Formats: Digital download | - | - | - |
| Hired Gun | Released: March 7, 2007; Label: Self-released; Formats: Digital download | - | - | - |
| Murder Capitol (with Pooda Brown, Neef Buck and DJ LRM) | Released: March 30, 2007; Label: Self-released; Formats: Digital download | - | - | - |
| Politically Incorrect | Released: September 21, 2007; Label: Self-released; Formats: Digital download | - | - | - |
| The Newprint | Released: December 5, 2007; Label: Self-released; Formats: Digital download | - | - | - |
| Young Chris-Mas | Released: December 25, 2007; Label: Self-released; Formats: Digital download | - | - | - |
| Campaign For Change | Released: August 4, 2008; Label: Self-released; Formats: Digital download | - | - | - |
| Now or Never | Released: September 26, 2008; Label: Self-released; Formats: Digital download | - | - | - |
| 30 Days 30 Verses | Released: December 25, 2008; Label: Self-released; Formats: Digital download | - | - | - |
| The Network | Released: July 19, 2009; Label: Self-released; Formats: Digital download | - | - | - |
| The Network 2 | Released: May 19, 2010; Label: Self-released; Formats: Digital download | - | - | - |
| The Re-Introduction | Released: November 20, 2010; Label: Self-released; Formats: Digital download | - | - | - |
| LIFE: Ladies In For Free | Released: June 14, 2011; Label: Division 1; Formats: Digital download | - | - | - |
| The Revival | Released: October 31, 2011; Label: Division 1; Formats: Digital download | - | - | - |
| Gunna Season | Released: May 6, 2014; Label: Jaccpot Entertainment; Formats: Digital download | - | - | - |
| The Network 3 | Released: November 28, 2014; Label: Self-released; Formats: Digital download | - | - | - |
| The Network 4 | Released: March 10, 2017; Label: Self-released; Formats: Digital download | - | - | - |

=== Guest appearances ===
| Title | Year | Other artist(s) | Album |
|---|---|---|---|
| "Nigga Please" | 2002 | Jay-Z | The Blueprint 2: The Gift & The Curse |
| "Work For Me" | 2004 | Ol' Dirty Bastard | A Son Unique |
| "Call Me (Remix)" | 2005 | Play-n-Skillz, Lil' Flip Chamillionaire | The Album Before the Album |
| "Connect 4" | 2009 | Joe Budden | Escape Route |
| "Microphone Killa" | 2010 | Freeway, Jake One | The Stimulus Package |
| "The Last Two" | 2010 | Beanie Sigel, Freeway | The Roc Boys |
| "Serious" | 2010 | Beanie Sigel, Freeway | The Roc Boys |
| "Fresh ta Def" | 2010 | Beanie Sigel, Freeway | The Roc Boys |
| "Lay Low" | 2011 | DJ Drama, Meek Mill, Freeway | Third Power |
| "House Party" | 2011 | Meek Mill | Dreamchasers |
| "Philly Mega Mix" | 2011 | Eve, Black Thought, Money Malc, Fat Joe, Fred the Godson, Diggy Simmons, Jermaine Dupri, the Game | Purp & Patron: The Hangover |
| "Dangerous" | 2012 | Beanie Sigel, the Game | This Time |
| "City of Sin" | 2012 | Lloyd Banks | V.6: The Gift |
| "Real Shit" | 2012 | Freeway | Freedom of Speech |
| "Greystone" | 2012 | The Game, Fat Joe, Sam Hook | California Republic |
| "Believe Me Freestyle" | 2014 | Phat Geez | Cut From A Different Cloth 2 |

== See also ==
- Young Gunz discography
- State Property discography
