= Feelin' Myself (Nipsey Hussle song) =

Single by Nipsey Hussle featuring Lloyd
- Released: July 9, 2010
- Recorded: 2010
- Genre: Pop rap
- Length: 3:43
- Label: Cinematic; Epic
- Songwriters: Ermias Asghedom: Christopher Steven Brown; Larrance Dopson; Jeret Black; Lloyd Polite; Shaleah Nicole Stubblefield
- Producer: 1500 or Nothin'

Nipsey Hussle singles chronology
"They Roll" (2010)	"Feelin' Myself" (2010)	"Proud of That" (2012)

Lloyd singles chronology
"Any Girl" (2010)	"Feelin' Myself" (2010)	"Lay It Down" (2010)

Music video
- "Feelin' Myself" on Tidal

"Feelin' Myself" is a song by American hip hop recording artist Nipsey Hussle, released July 9, 2010, as the lead single from his canceled debut studio album under Epic Records, South Central State of Mind. The song, produced by 1500 of Nothin', features American singer-songwriter Lloyd, with whom he previously collaborated on "Gotta Take It" earlier in 2009. The song then peaked at number 93 on the US Billboard Hot R&B/Hip-Hop Songs chart. The song was later included on Hussle's compilation album The Leaks, Vol. 1.

== Background ==
Following inking a publishing deal with BMI in April 2010, Nipsey Hussle revealed the first official single from his debut studio album, South Central State of Mind featuring singer Lloyd soon. On June 10, 2010, the audio for "Feelin' Myself" was released. The songs production handled by Los Angeles–based production team 1500 or Nothin'. On July 9, 2010, the song was released for digital download by Epic Records. This version featured a new verse sung by Lloyd.

== Music and lyrics ==
In the song Nipsey Hussle features his usual hefty street-oriented verses. They detail self-love, flaunting his cash, his looks, and his skills with the ladies. The song is topped off with a guest hook and verse by singer Lloyd and a smooth bridge by an uncredited female vocalist. He explained how the Lloyd collaboration came about saying, "When I got signed they asked me who I would like to work with, I said Lloyd and so we got on the phone in 2009 and we spoke. We did a record for my Bullets Ain't Got No Names Vol: 3 mixtape and from then on me and Lloyd have been cool. When I heard this record I was like, "This is big, I need a star that;s got the vocals, swag, and the fans to complement the record, so I thought Lloyd fitted it perfectly and he's my home boy, so it all came out cool."

== Music video ==
On July 19, 2010, Nipsey Hussle filmed the music video in Los Angeles, California, with Lloyd. On July 26, 2010, Rap-Up released a behind the scenes video of the music video. The Marc Klasfeld-directed music video was finally premiered on August 30, 2010. The video received over 800,000 views in less than two weeks on YouTube, and was put into rotation on BET.

== Chart positions ==
Chart (2010)	Peak position
US Hot R&B/Hip-Hop Songs (Billboard)	93
