= H.F.M. 2 (The Hunger for More 2) =

Studio album by Lloyd Banks
- Released: November 22, 2010
- Recorded: 2009–2010
- Studio: Gang Green (Long Island); Engine Room Audio (New York City)
- Genre: Hip-hop
- Label: G-Unit; Capitol
- Producer: 50 Cent (exec.); Cardiak; Grandz Muzik; Bliz Money; Nick Speed; Prime; Ryan Leslie; G Sparkz; Dirk Pate; Dre McKenzie; The Watcherz; Dready; J.U.S.T.I.C.E. League; Frank Dukes; Lab Ox; Vikaden; Boi-1da; Matthew Burnett; Doe Pesci; Young Seph

Lloyd Banks chronology
Rotten Apple (2006)	H.F.M. 2 (The Hunger for More 2) (2010)	The Course of the Inevitable (2021)

Singles from H.F.M. 2 (The Hunger for More 2)
- 1. "Beamer, Benz, or Bentley" Released: February 9, 2010; 2. "Any Girl" Released: June 8, 2010; 3. "Start It Up" Released: November 2, 2010; 4. "I Don't Deserve You" Released: January 6, 2011; 5. "So Forgetful" Released: May 8, 2011

H.F.M. 2 (The Hunger for More 2) is the third studio album by American rapper Lloyd Banks, released on November 22, 2010 through G-Unit Records and Capitol Records.

== Background ==
Using Twitter, Lloyd Banks originally stated that the album was called The Hunger for More 2. It was unknown whether the album name was official or not. The title of the album was later confirmed by 50 Cent in an interview with MTV News. The album was thought to be possibly released under Interscope, by a new contract of the label and the rapper; also the Interscope chairman Jimmy Iovine revealed that he wants to sign the rapper to Interscope again, and he asked label mate 50 Cent "what can I do to sign Lloyd Banks again?". Banks has said that he is willing to re-sign, but only if Interscope is willing to issue an apology for "doubting him."

On August 13, 2010, Banks said this about his upcoming album, "When I wrote [The Hunger for More], I took my whole life and tried to squeeze all those experiences into one album. You’ve got your whole life to make your first album and you can’t get it all out in 14 songs. There are a lot of similarities between The Hunger for More and The Hunger for More 2. One, the fact that I made both of these albums without any distractions or input from the label, or anyone else for that matter. Two, the energy feels the same."

Banks announced that his album would be released under G-Unit Records and EMI. After the album was released, Lloyd Banks stated that he completed the one-album deal with EMI and he was a free agent again. In an interview on Global Grind live, he stated that he had worked with J.U.S.T.I.C.E. League on the project. In relation to this statement, a song leaked entitled "Don't Deserve You" which was produced by J.U.S.T.I.C.E. League.

== Title and cover ==
The album is named after Lloyd Banks' first album The Hunger for More, he said he wanted to regain the success that he had with it. The album cover was released by Lloyd Banks' official website and Twitter page on October 5, 2010. The album cover is similar to his first but show changes in wealth and surrounding.

== Guests and production ==
In an interview with Shade 45's G-Unit Radio with Miss Mimi, Banks confirmed that new producers would also be on the project; including Cardiak, Buda and Grandz, and Nick Speed. Banks also confirmed production from Ryan Leslie, Lamis Carneiro, Nascent, Young Seph, and G'Sparkz. It was confirmed by thisis50.com that Lloyd Banks had been working with Doe Pesci in the studio on beats for the album. In interviews with MTV News Banks' confirmed that Cardiak produces four songs on the album.

Confirmed guests include Eminem, Kanye West, Lloyd, Juelz Santana, 50 Cent, Styles P, Raekwon, Tony Yayo, Jeremih and Akon. Newly confirmed artists on the album are, Fabolous, Pusha T, Governor and Swizz Beatz. Even though 50 Cent confirmed Chris Brown was on the album, Banks later denied this in an interview with XXL. In an interview with XXL, Banks confirmed that he had wanted to have Prodigy on the track with Styles P on the album. Banks confirmed that he had had a conversation with R&B singer Ashanti to possibly collaborate for the album. In mid October, a YouTube video containing footage of Banks in the studio with both Gucci Mane and Waka Flocka Flame was released, in which they were supposedly recording a song for the album. Lloyd Banks originally said that Nipsey Hussle would be on the album, but this didn't happen.

== Release and promotion ==
On Twitter, Lloyd Banks said that he will start promoting the album, whilst travelling to different cities doing shows. In an interview, Banks stated that he would be touring Europe in late 2010 to help promote the album there. Just days later, Lloyd Banks appeared on Chelsea Lately along with The Mo'Nique Show to promote the album.

The album was made available for pre-order on iTunes on November 2, 2010, along with the single "Start It Up." Lloyd Banks will be releasing a documentary on MTV, called The Road to H.F.M. 2. It will premiere the day after his album is released along with another documentary that will appear on his Ustream.tv channel. Lloyd Banks revisited MTV rap fix live and premiered a couple of tracks.

=== Singles ===
"Beamer, Benz, or Bentley" was released on February 9, 2010, featuring Juelz Santana, and has been confirmed as the first single. The remix was released on May 13, 2010, featuring Ludacris, The-Dream, Jadakiss, Yo Gotti.

"Any Girl" is the second single from the album and it features R&B singer Lloyd. It was released on June 8, 2010. The music video was released on August 15 through MTV. "Start It Up" was confirmed as the third single from the album. It was released to iTunes on November 2, 2010. It features Swizz Beatz, Kanye West, Ryan Leslie & Fabolous.

"I Don't Deserve You" was confirmed as the fourth single from the album by 50 Cent in an interview with MTV News. The single features R&B singer Jeremih. It was released as a digital download on November 22, 2010, and released to radios on January 6, 2011. "So Forgetful" is the fifth single from the album which features R&B singer and producer Ryan Leslie. The music video was released on May 8, 2011, through MTV.

== Reception ==
=== Commercial performance ===
The album debuted at number 26 on the US Billboard 200 chart with first-week sales of about 49,000 units in the United States. The album also peaked at number 60 on the Canadian Albums Chart.

=== Critical response ===
Professional ratings
Aggregate scores
Source	Rating
Metacritic	(64/100)
Review scores
Source	Rating
AllHipHop	(7/10)
AllMusic	3.5/5 stars
DJ Booth	3.5/5 stars
HipHopDX	3.5/5 stars
Now	3/5 stars
PopMatters	4/10 stars
Q	3/5 stars
Rolling Stone	3.5/5 stars
Spin	(7/10)
USA Today	3/4 stars

Upon its release, H.F.M. 2 received positive reviews from most music critics. At Metacritic, which assigns a normalized rating out of 100 to reviews from mainstream critics, the album received an average score of 64, based on 9 reviews, which indicates "generally favorable reviews". Slava Kuperstein of HipHopDX noted a marked improvement over Banks' 2006 effort Rotten Apple, stating that "the execution isn’t as good the second time around, but Banks has reestablished his sound, and made clear that he is still a major force to be reckoned with in the rap game." Allmusic writer Dave Jeffries, despite citing a lack of new ideas as one of the album's weaknesses, was also positive about the album: "At 13 tracks the album feels right-sized, not overstuffed, and Banks himself is in fine form throughout, delivering stone cold and slow punch lines that are as lethal as ever. When it comes to evolution, there’s really none, but even though he’s been here before, veteran fans will appreciate his return."

Giving the album a rating of 7/10, Ben Detrick of Spin stated that "Lloyd Banks' hunger is not born of starvation, but of an insatiable appetite. On his third solo effort, the G-Unit rapper is a connoisseur of cars, women, and guns, spinning tight spider webs of syllables that are often so patterned that they obscure individual strands. "Put my Ferrari in park, give 'em a running start," Banks growls on "Payback," a sinister track with mentor 50 Cent and a woozy, almost dubstep bass line. But he loves the ladies almost as much as barking threats. On "So Forgetful," an apology to past conquests, Banks muses about "wet spots on the mattress and champagne splashes" atop producer Ryan Leslie's 8-bit Atari synths." Steve Jones of USA Today was also positive about the album, giving the album 3/4 stars and citing that "the G-Unit rapper seeks to rekindle the spark of his critically acclaimed 2004 platinum debut by recalling both the title and the potent street vibe. Banks enlists several like-minded rappers — Pusha T, Styles P, Juelz Santana and Raekwon— who complement his own grittiness. The same goes for R&B stars Akon and Lloyd as he relies mainly on his signature jaw-breaking punch lines while eschewing a rash of poppish hooks. Banks is well served by his refusal to compromise just for airplay. His Hunger should whet his fans' appetites for even more."

== Track listing ==
H.F.M. 2 (The Hunger for More 2) track listing
No.	Title	Writer(s)	Producer(s)	Length
1.	"Take 'Em to War" (featuring Tony Yayo)	Christopher Lloyd; Marvin Bernard; Carl McCormick	Cardiak	3:29
2.	"Unexplainable" (featuring Styles P)	Lloyd; David Styles; McCormick	Cardiak	4:15
3.	"Payback (P's & Q's)" (featuring 50 Cent)	Lloyd; Kenny Nolan	Grandz Muzik; Bliz Money	4:12
4.	"Home Sweet Home" (featuring Pusha T)	Lloyd; William Ross; Terrence Thornton	Nick Speed	3:59
5.	"Beamer, Benz, or Bentley" (featuring Juelz Santana)	Lloyd; LaRon James; Michael Forno	Prime	3:28
6.	"So Forgetful" (featuring Ryan Leslie)	Lloyd; Ryan Leslie	Ryan Leslie	3:59
7.	"Father Time"	Lloyd; Gregorio Ford	G'Sparkz	3:25
8.	"Start It Up" (featuring Swizz Beatz, Kanye West, Ryan Leslie and Fabolous)	Lloyd; Kasseem Dean; Kanye West; John Jackson; McCormick	Cardiak	4:49
9.	"Celebrity" (featuring Akon)	Lloyd; Aliaune Thiam; Dirk Pate; Andre McKenzie	Dirk Pate; Dré McKenzie	3:29
10.	"On the Double"	Lloyd; George Gershwin; Ira Gershwin; DuBose Heyward; P. Jackson; N. Jackson	The WatcherZ	2:49
11.	"Any Girl" (featuring Lloyd)	Lloyd; Lloyd Polite Jr.; Karl Daniel	Dready	3:31
12.	"I Don't Deserve You" (featuring Jeremih)	Lloyd; Jeremih Felton; Kevin Crowe; Erik Ortiz	J.U.S.T.I.C.E. League	3:52
13.	"Sooner or Later (Die 1 Day)" (featuring Raekwon)	Lloyd; Corey Woods; Adam Feeny	Frank Dukes	3:31
Total length:				48:44

iTunes bonus tracks
No.	Title	Writer(s)	Producer(s)	Length
14.	"Kill It" (featuring Governor)	Lloyd; Gio Washington	Lab Ox; Vikaden	3:21
15.	"Where I'm At" (featuring Eminem)	Lloyd; Marshall Mathers; Matthew Samuels; Matthew Burnett	Boi-1da; Matthew Burnett	5:18
Total length:				57:23

European bonus tracks
No.	Title	Writer(s)	Producer(s)	Length
14.	"When I Get There"	Lloyd; Doe Pesci	Doe Pesci	3:09
15.	"Make Money"	Lloyd; Pesci	Doe Pesci	4:26
Total length:				56:19

F.Y.E. bonus tracks
No.	Title	Writer(s)	Producer(s)	Length
14.	"This Is the Life"	Lloyd; Joseph Holmes	Young Seph; Cardiak	3:13
15.	"Stuntin'"	Lloyd; Ford	G'Sparkz	3:00
Total length:				54:57

Sample credits

- "Payback (P's and Q's)" contains a sample of "A Song Between Us" as performed by Kenny Nolan
- "Home Sweet Home" contains a sample of "The Detroit Riot" as performed by Essie Moss and Rev. Robert Grant
- "On the Double" contains a sample of "Summertime" as performed by Billy Stewart
- "Sooner or Later (Die 1 Day)" contains a sample of "Like Toy Soldiers" as performed by Eminem

== Personnel ==
- George Gershwin - Composer
- Ira Gershwin - Composer
- Steve Baughman - Mixing
- Happy Walters - Composer
- A. McKenzie - Composer
- Anthony Daniel - Mixing Assistant
- Nancie Stern - Sample Clearance
- Nikki Martin - Coordination
- Ryan Leslie - Programming
- Ryan Leslie - Producer
- Ryan Leslie - Instrumentation
- Mark B. Christensen - Mastering
- Shareif Ziyadat - Photography
- Nick Speed - Producer
- J.U.S.T.I.C.E. League - Producer
- Ky Miller - Percussion
- Ky Miller - Engineer
- Ky Miller - Mixing
- Dready - Producer
- Daniel Fry - Mastering Assistant
- Noah Goldstein - Engineer
- Raphael Fiorda - Mastering Assistant
- Tim Saroce - Engineer
- Tim Saroce - Editing
- N. Jackson - Composer
- E. Ortiz - Composer
- J. Felton - Composer
- C. McCormick - Composer
- R. Leslie - Composer
- K. Crowe - Composer
- D. Styles - Composer
- M. Forno - Composer
- Michelle Figueroa - Mixing Assistant
- Al Carlson - Mixing Assistant
- A. Thiam - Composer
- Frank Dukes - Producer
- P. Jackson - Composer
- K. Nolan - Composer
- M. Bernard - Composer
- Mia Quinn - Stylist
- Dré McKenzie - Producer
- Dré McKenzie - A&R
- Dré McKenzie - Vocal Producer
- Pat Viala - Engineer
- Pat Viala - Mixing
- Ever Ronquillo - Mixing Assistant
- Danny Irizarry - Mixing Assistant
- Jesse Morav - Engineer
- Gregorio "G'Sparkz" Ford Jr. - Producer
- Grandz Muzik - Producer
- Gloria Kaba - Mixing Assistant
- Frank Williams - Mixing Assistant
- Doe Pesci - Engineer
- Dirk Pate - Producer
- Bliz Money - Producer
- Alberto Erazo - Art Direction
- Alberto Erazo - Design
- William A. Moss Sr. - Composer
- Tony Girakhoo - A&R
- The WatcherZ - Producer
- Sharon Salamone - Administration
- Raphael Fiora - Mastering Assistant
- Pawel Szarejko - Engineer
- Pawel Szarejko - Editing
- Michael Hausmann - Mixing Assistant
- Angel J. Martinez - Product Manager
- Corentin Villemeur - New Media
- Chris Lopez - New Media

== Charts ==
Chart performance for H.F.M. 2 (The Hunger for More 2)
Chart (2010–2011)	Peak position
Canadian Albums (Nielsen SoundScan)	60
UK R&B Albums (Official Charts)	37
US Billboard 200	26
US Independent Albums (Billboard)	2
US Indie Store Album Sales (Billboard)	15
US Top R&B/Hip-Hop Albums (Billboard)	6
US Top Rap Albums (Billboard)	4

== Release history ==
Region	Date	Label(s)	Format	Catalog
United States	November 22, 2010	G-Unit; EMI	Digital download; CD	B0046JLTBU
Canada	November 22, 2010	G-Unit; EMI	Digital download; CD	B0046JLTBU
United Kingdom	November 29, 2010	G-Unit; EMI	Digital download; CD	B0046JLTBU
Germany	November 29, 2010	G-Unit; EMI	Digital download; CD	B0046JLTBU
Ireland	November 29, 2010	G-Unit; EMI	Digital download; CD	B0046JLTBU
