= On Fire (Lloyd Banks song) =

- "On Fire" cover art

Single by Lloyd Banks

from the album The Hunger for More
- Released: April 27, 2004
- Genre: Hip hop
- Length: 3:07
- Label: Interscope; G-Unit
- Songwriters: C. Lloyd; C. Jackson; K. Holland; Luis Resto; M. Mathers; H. Palmer
- Producers: Eminem; K1 Mil; Luis Resto

Lloyd Banks singles chronology
"On Fire" (2004)	"I'm So Fly" (2004)

50 Cent singles chronology
"If I Can't" (2003)	"On Fire" (2004)	"Let Me In" (2004)

Audio
- "On Fire" on YouTube

"On Fire" is the debut single from Lloyd Banks' debut album, The Hunger for More, released through Interscope Records and 50 Cent's G-Unit Records. It quickly became a nationwide hit and cemented Lloyd Banks' name in the hip hop scene. The single peaked inside the top ten in the U.S., reaching #8. The song samples "The Champ", performed by The Mohawks.

== Background ==
The chorus contains vocals by 50 Cent, though he is uncredited. The song was produced by Eminem and Kwamé. Writing credits were given to Lloyd Banks, Eminem, Kwamé, 50 Cent, Luis Resto and Peter Harmsworth.

In a 2024 interview with Hot 97, 50 Cent claimed that he had copied elements of "Hot in Herre" by Nelly when writing the chorus of "On Fire"; he rapped the choruses of both songs back-to-back to highlight the similarities.

The single peaked at #8 on the Billboard Hot 100 and was certified Gold by the RIAA.

== Music video ==
The music video, directed by Jessy Terrero, features Lloyd Banks rapping on the roof of a small building that is on top of a large hotel building. The video contains cameos by fellow G-Unit members 50 Cent, Young Buck and Game, as well as G-Unit artist Olivia. At the end of the video, 50 Cent is seen breaking through glass and the song changes to the chorus and the first verse of the song "Warrior", which is also from Lloyd Bank's debut album The Hunger for More.

The music video on YouTube has received over 40 million views as of May 2024.

== Charts and certifications ==
=== Weekly charts ===
Chart (2004)	Peak position
Australia (ARIA)	44
Australian Urban (ARIA)	14
Canada CHR/Pop Top 30 (Radio & Records)	21
Germany (GfK)	36
Ireland (IRMA)	25
Netherlands (Single Top 100)	45
Scotland Singles (Official Charts)	24
Switzerland (Schweizer Hitparade)	18
UK Hip Hop/R&B (Official Charts)	5
UK Singles (Official Charts)	19
US Billboard Hot 100	8
US Hot R&B/Hip-Hop Songs (Billboard)	4
US Hot Rap Songs (Billboard)	2
US Pop Airplay (Billboard)	29
US Rhythmic Airplay (Billboard)	3

=== Year-end charts ===
Chart (2004)	Peak position
US Billboard Hot 100	55
US Hot R&B/Hip-Hop Songs (Billboard)	34
US Rap Songs (Billboard)	17

=== Certifications ===
Region	Certification	Certified units/sales
United Kingdom (BPI)	Silver	200,000^{‡}
United States (RIAA)	Gold	500,000^{^}
^{^} Shipments figures based on certification alone.^{‡} Sales+streaming figures based on certification alone.

== Release history ==
Region	Date	Format(s)	Label(s)	Ref.
United States	May 10, 2004	Rhythmic contemporary · urban contemporary radio	G-Unit, Interscope	
United States	June 28, 2004	Contemporary hit radio	G-Unit, Interscope	
