= Kevin Cossom =

American singer and songwriter

- Cossom in 2011

Background information
- Born: Kevin Bryant Cossom; September 2, 1984 (age 42); Philadelphia, Pennsylvania, U.S.
- Origin: Orlando, Florida, U.S.
- Genres: R&B; pop rap
- Occupations: Singer; songwriter; record producer
- Labels: Hood Nation; We the Best; Jive; N.A.R.S.

Kevin Bryant Cossom (born September 2, 1984) is an American singer, songwriter, and record producer. Born in Philadelphia and raised in Orlando, Florida, Cossom has co-written hit songs for music industry artists including Keri Hilson ("Knock You Down" featuring Kanye West and Ne-Yo), DJ Khaled ("Do You Mind", "I Wanna Be With You," and "Take It to the Head"), Rihanna, Beyoncé and Mary J. Blige, among others. His songwriting is often accompanied with productions by the Florida-based groups the Runners, the Inkredibles, J.U.S.T.I.C.E. League, DJ Nasty & LVM, and The Monarch, as well as Virginia-based producer Danja. As a recording artist, he provided an uncredited guest performance on Lloyd Banks' 2004 single, "Karma", which peaked within the top 20 of the Billboard Hot 100.

He amassed numerous credits by the time he signed with Danja's record label, N.A.R.S., in a joint venture with Jive Records in 2009 to further pursue a recording career. His 2009 debut single, "You're a Star (You Know What You Doin’)" and its follow-ups "Late Night", "Baby I Like It" (featuring Fabolous and Diddy), and "Relax" (featuring Snoop Dogg), have each failed to chart and served as his only releases with the label.

== Career ==
=== 1999–2004: Career beginnings ===
Cossom grew up in Orlando, Florida, as an only child to a single mother – an educator and founder of a performing arts academy. She encouraged him to perform his first solo at the age of three. While his exposure to secular music was limited, Cossom was able to hone his skills singing in his gospel church choir. At the age of six, he joined his first group, a gospel act assembled by his mother, and at 14, formed a short-lived singing group with friends. From 1999–2002, Cossom fronted the Orlando-based R&B group Nu Ground, along with Andrew Seeley. Three years later, he began to build a reputation as a songwriter and singer.

In 2004, after a meeting with 50 Cent at his Connecticut mansion, Cossom was asked to write and perform the hook for a song that G-Unit member Lloyd Banks was working on. This resulted in "Karma" – a hit single on Banks' debut album, The Hunger for More (2004). Though Cossom was replaced by Avant on the video and radio versions of the single, through this encounter, he received his first commercial songwriting credit.

After returning home, Cossom met the Orlando-based hip-hop production duo The Runners through a mutual DJ friend. Within a year, the duo asked Cossom to assist with a song they were producing for Young Jeezy's album, The Inspiration: Thug Motivation 102. Cossom went on to write the hook for Jeezy's single "Go Getta" (featuring R. Kelly), which ultimately led to Cossom securing a publishing deal with Warner/Chappell. Through this deal, Cossom was introduced to record producer Danja. Cossom was asked to write songs for a girl group produced by Danja. The two developed a chemistry that led to Cossom being the first act signed to the producer's N.A.R.S. record label.

=== 2009–present: Hook vs. Bridge, By Any Means and Hook vs. Bridge II ===
Since joining forces with Danja, Cossom has gone on to lent vocals to and wrote for several high-profile acts throughout the music industry. In November 2009, Cossom released Hook vs. Bridge, an extended play (EP) with production from Danja and the Runners (among others) and features the song "I Get Paper" featuring Canadian rapper Drake; other guest artists include Rick Ross and Pusha T.

In March 2011, Cossom released the mixtape By Any Means, for which he teamed up once again with Danja, the Runners and Rick Ross, along with features from J. Cole, Ace Hood. On October 7, RCA Music Group announced it was disbanding Jive Records along with Arista Records and J Records. With the shutdown, Cossom (and all other artists previously signed to these three labels) was slated to issue his subsequent releases on the RCA Records brand, although he ultimately never did so.

In April 2012, Cossom released the EP, Hook vs. Bridge II where he collaborated with producer ThLttry. Without containing any featured artists, the EP has been downloaded on mixtape sharing site, DatPiff, over 233,625 times and was awarded "Gold celebrated mixtape".

== Discography ==
Extended plays

- Hook vs. Bridge (2009)
- Hook vs. Bridge II (2012)
- Grey Area (2016)

Mixtapes

- By Any Means (2011)
- Tomorrow (2015)
- Hood Nation Boyz (WithAce Hood) (2020)
- Highlife Cossom (2020)
- Hook Vs Bridge III (TBA)
