= Karma (Lloyd Banks song) =

Single by Lloyd Banks

from the album The Hunger for More
- Released: October 19, 2004
- Genre: Hip-hop; R&B
- Length: 4:38
- Label: G-Unit; Interscope
- Songwriters: Christopher Lloyd; Kevin Cossom
- Producer: Greg "Ginx" Doby

Lloyd Banks singles chronology
"I'm So Fly" (2004)	"Karma" (2004)	"Twist It" (2005)

"Karma" is the third and final single from Lloyd Banks's debut album, The Hunger for More. Avant is a guest artist on the music video and radio version, while singer Kevin Cossom provides additional vocals on the album version of the song.

== Background ==
Karma was released in October 2004. It debuted at number 71 and peaked at number 17 on the U.S. Billboard Hot 100. The R&B singer Avant appears on the video and radio versions, while singer Kevin Cossom is heard on the chorus of the album version. The song was produced by Greg "Ginx" Doby and samples "Inseparable" by Natalie Cole.

== Music video ==
The music video for the song was directed by Little X and features a guest appearance from KD Aubert as Lloyd Banks' love interest. At the end of the video the screen goes static and Tony Yayo raps his verse from the song Ain't No Click.

== Charts ==
=== Weekly charts ===
Chart (2004–2005)	Peak position
US Billboard Hot 100	17
US Hot R&B/Hip-Hop Songs (Billboard)	9
US Hot Rap Songs (Billboard)	6
US Rhythmic Airplay (Billboard)	15

=== Year-end charts ===
Chart (2005)	Position
US Hot R&B/Hip-Hop Songs (Billboard)	38

== Release history ==
Region	Date	Format(s)	Label(s)	Ref.
United States	October 11, 2004	Urban contemporary radio	G-Unit, Interscope	
