= The Course of the Inevitable =

Studio album by Lloyd Banks
- Released: June 4, 2021
- Genre: Hip-hop; East Coast hip-hop
- Length: 67:54
- Label: Money by Any Means; EMPIRE
- Producer: 2wo4our; Alpha Betic; Cartune Beatz; Chase N. Cashe; Dual Output; Eli Brown; Encornelious; Fruition Beats; Illatracks; Motif Alumni; Mr. Authentic; Nothin But M's; The Olympicks; Phill Jvckson; Rxnway; Shadow Magnetic; Super Miles; Tha Jerm

Lloyd Banks chronology
H.F.M. 2 (The Hunger for More 2) (2010)	The Course of the Inevitable (2021)	The Course of the Inevitable 2 (2022)

Professional ratings
Review scores
Source	Rating
AllMusic	4/5 stars
Beats Per Minute	80/100
RapReviews	8/10

The Course of the Inevitable is the fourth studio album by American rapper Lloyd Banks. It was released on June 4, 2021. It is his first full-length studio album since H.F.M. 2 (2010), and his first to be released since his departure from G-Unit Records in 2018.

== Background ==
On April 30, 2021, during his 39th birthday, Banks released an instrumental teaser for the album, revealing only the acronym for the album title. On May 14, 2021, a similar teaser was released, this time with a brief spoken-word monologue from poet Rashan Brown recorded over the same piano backing. A full three-minute trailer would then be released exactly a week later on May 21, 2021, not only having an extended spoken-word monologue from Brown over the same piano backing (which would become the instrumental for the album track "Sidewalks"), but also revealing the album's full title.

On May 25, 2021, Banks revealed the cover art and the album's track listing on Instagram. Three days prior to the album's release, on June 1, the track listing was then updated with a Freddie Gibbs feature on the song "Empathy".

== Reception ==
=== Critical response ===
The Course of the Inevitable received critical acclaim from music critics. AllMusic's Andy Kellman called the album "a conspicuous return, the reclamation of a lane the rapper started to navigate with proficiency in the early 2000s", while Chase McMullen from Beats Per Minute stated, that the album "is just about the most lyrically dense statement in hip hop in recent memory, layered from top to bottom with fatigue and meaning to the extent that you'd think he was writing sentences over one another".

=== Commercial performance ===
In the United States, the project debuted at number 84 on the Billboard 200, selling 12,000 copies in its first week. In the United Kingdom, it peaked number 9 on the R&B Albums chart.

== Track listing ==
The Course of the Inevitable track listing
No.	Title	Writer(s)	Producer(s)	Length
1.	"Propane"	Christopher Lloyde; Jamie Robinson	ENCORNELIOUS	3:03
2.	"Sidewalks"	Lloyd	Cartune Beatz	2:58
3.	"Empathy" (featuring Freddie Gibbs)	Lloyde; Fredrick Jamel Tipton	Cartune Beatz	4:15
4.	"Early Exit" (featuring Roc Marciano)	Lloyde; Rahkeim Calief Meyer	Rxnway	4:16
5.	"Formaldehyde" (featuring Benny the Butcher)	Lloyde; Jeremie Damon Pennick	Nothing But M’s	3:35
6.	"Death by Design"	Lloyde	The Olympicks; Motif Alumni	4:01
7.	"Food" (featuring Styles P)	Lloyde; David R. Styles	Illatracks	3:11
8.	"Crown"	Lloyde	Alpha Betic; Shadow Magnetic	3:18
9.	"Falsified" (featuring Ransom)	Lloyde; Randy Nichols	Cartune Beatz	3:58
10.	"Break Me Down"	Lloyde	Dual Output	4:51
11.	"Commitment"	Lloyde	Chase N. Cashe; Super Miles; Eli Brown	3:09
12.	"Pain Pressure Paranoia"	Lloyde	Phill Jvckson	4:31
13.	"Stranger Things"	Lloyde	2wo4our	2:56
14.	"Drop 5"	Lloyde	Fruition Beats	3:06
15.	"Panic" (featuring Sy Ari da Kid)	Lloyde; Sy Ari Brockington	Dual Output	4:17
16.	"Smoke and Mirrors"	Lloyde	Mr. Authentic	3:48
17.	"Dishonorable Discharge" (featuring Vado)	Lloyde; Teeyon Isiah Winfree	Mr. Authentic	4:46
18.	"C O T I"	Lloyde	Tha Jerm	3:48
Total length:				67:54

== Charts ==
Chart performance for The Course of the Inevitable
Chart (2021)	Peak position
UK R&B Albums (OCC)	9
US Billboard 200	84
US Top R&B/Hip-Hop Albums (Billboard)	45
