= Set It Off (Young Gunz song) =

Single by Young Gunz featuring Swizz Beatz

from the album Brothers from Another
- B-side: "Tonite"
- Released: May 2005
- Recorded: 2005
- Genre: Hip-hop
- Length: 3:35
- Label: Roc-A-Fella; Def Jam
- Songwriter(s): Christopher Ries; Hanif Muhammad; Kasseem Dean; Shawn Carter
- Producer(s): Swizz Beatz

Young Gunz singles chronology
"Friday Night" (2004)	"Set It Off" (2005)	"Don't Keep Me Waiting (Come Back Soon)" (2005)

Swizz Beatz singles chronology
"Bang Bang Boom" (2004)	"Set It Off" (2005)	"B-Boy Stance" (2005)

"Set It Off" is a song by American hip-hop duo Young Gunz, released in May 2005, as the lead single from their second studio album Brothers from Another. The song features vocals and production from Swizz Beatz. The song's music video, which was directed by Ben Mor, contains a portion of the single's B-side, titled "Tonite", towards the end of the video. The single peaked at number 52 on the Billboard Hot R&B/Hip-Hop Songs chart.

== Charts ==
Chart (2005)	Peak Position
U.S. Billboard Hot R&B/Hip-Hop Songs	52
