= The Course of the Inevitable 2 =

Studio album by Lloyd Banks
- Released: July 15, 2022
- Genre: East Coast hip-hop
- Length: 44:42
- Label: Money by Any Means; EMPIRE
- Producer: Cartune Beatz; Chris Noxx; Cryptic One; Doe Pesci; Fruition Beats; Mr. Authentic; Tha Jerm

Lloyd Banks chronology
The Course of the Inevitable (2021)	The Course of the Inevitable 2 (2022)	The Course of the Inevitable III: Pieces of My Pain (2023)

Professional ratings
Review scores
Source	Rating
HipHopDX	3.6/5
Pitchfork	6.5/10
RapReviews	8.5/10

The Course of the Inevitable 2 is the fifth studio album by American rapper Lloyd Banks. It was released on July 15, 2022, through EMPIRE and Banks' label imprint, Money by Any Means. Production was handled by Cartune Beatz, who produced the majority of the album, as well as Chris Noxx, Cryptic One, Doe Pesci, Fruition Beats, Mr. Authentic and Tha Jerm. The album features guest appearances from fellow American rappers Benny the Butcher, Conway the Machine, Dave East, Jadakiss, Tony Yayo and Vado.

== Background ==
On April 29, 2022, Banks announced he was working on the sequel to his previous album The Course of the Inevitable. He also announced that the album would be released during summer 2022.

On July 8, 2022, he revealed the track listing of the album and announced that the album would be released on July 15, 2022.

== Track listing ==
- Credits adapted from Tidal.

The Course of the Inevitable 2 track listing
No.	Title	Writer(s)	Producer(s)	Length
1.	"Impact"	Christopher Charles Lloyde	Cartune Beatz	2:59
2.	"No Reward"	Lloyde	Cartune Beatz	2:34
3.	"Menace" (with Conway the Machine)	Lloyde; Demond Price	Cartune Beatz	3:49
4.	"Living Proof" (with Benny the Butcher)	Lloyde; Jeremie Damon Pennick	Cartune Beatz	3:48
5.	"Value of a Check"	Lloyde	Fruition Beats	2:32
6.	"Power Steering" (with Jadakiss)	Lloyde; Jason Terrance Phillips	Mr. Authentic	3:40
7.	"Fell in Love"	Lloyde	Chris Noxx	2:22
8.	"Socialize"	Lloyde	Cartune Beatz	2:32
9.	"Murda One"	Lloyde	Doe Pesci	2:57
10.	"Don't Switch" (with Tony Yayo)	Lloyde; Marvin Bernard	Tha Jerm	4:41
11.	"Dead Roses"	Lloyde	Cryptic One	3:11
12.	"Trapped"	Lloyde	Cartune Beatz	2:41
13.	"Traffic" (with Vado and Dave East)	Lloyde; Teeyon Isiah Winfree; David Lawrence Brewster Jr.	Cartune Beatz	4:05
14.	"On My Way"	Lloyde	Cartune Beatz	2:51
Total length:				44:42

== Charts ==
Chart performance for The Course of the Inevitable 2
Chart (2022)	Peak position
US Top Album Sales (Billboard)	96
US Current Album Sales (Billboard)	52
US Independent Albums (Billboard)	46
