= Rapid Fire (mixtape) =

Mixtape by Young Gunz
- Released: January 29, 2008 (U.S.)
- Recorded: 2005
- Genre: Hip hop
- Label: Young Gunz; Koch

Young Gunz chronology
Brothers from Another (2005)	Rapid Fire (2008)

Rapid Fire is a mixtape by Philadelphia rap-duo Young Gunz. It was recorded in 2005, but was not released until January 29, 2008. Unlike the previous two albums by Young Chris and Neef Buck, the album was not a Roc-A-Fella/Def Jam release, but a release on their own record label, named Young Gunz Media. Most of these tracks had appeared on several mixtapes, and Rapid Fire is therefore different from Tough Luv and Brothers from Another. There are three appearances by Pooda Brown, one from Rell and one from Deemi.

== Track listing ==
1. "Rapid Fire Intro"
2. "Sixth Man for Life" (featuring Pooda Brown)
3. "Gun Shots" (prod. by Chad West)
4. "Parkside G.I.F.I"
5. "Chase That"
6. "I'm a Trapper" (featuring Pooda Brown)
7. "Young Chris"
8. "Same Ol' C"
9. "Put Ya Guns Up" (featuring Pooda Brown)
10. "My Part of Town"
11. "Keep It Close"
12. "Yg's Coming"
13. "That Block"
14. "The R.O.C the Life"
15. "Live or Die" (featuring Rell)
16. "Soundtrack of My Life" (featuring Deemi)
