= Any Girl =

Single by Lloyd Banks featuring Lloyd

from the album H.F.M. 2 (The Hunger for More 2)
- Released: June 8, 2010
- Recorded: 2010
- Genre: Hip hop
- Length: 3:29
- Label: G-Unit; EMI
- Songwriters: Christopher Lloyd; Lloyd Polite Jr.; Karl Daniel
- Producer: Dready

Lloyd Banks singles chronology
"Beamer, Benz, or Bentley" (2010)	"Any Girl" (2010)	"Start It Up" (2010)

Lloyd singles chronology
"BedRock" (2009)	"Any Girl" (2010)	"Feelin' Myself" (2010)

"Any Girl" is a song by the American hip hop recording artist Lloyd Banks, the second single released from his third album, H.F.M. 2 (The Hunger for More 2) (2010). The song features the American R&B singer Lloyd and was produced by Dready. It was released as a digital download on June 8, 2010.

== Background ==
The song was initially titled "Got 'Em Like" and the hook was originally sung by Banks himself. In an interview, Lloyd said of working with Banks, "There was no hesitation on my part because we never had direct issues... We met for the first time in the studio and everything just clicked. It felt like it was our 10th song together. This refers to the rivalry between G-Unit, which Lloyd Banks is signed to, and Murder Inc., to which he was formerly signed.

After signing his new deal with EMI Group, EMI Label Services' began promoting "Any Girl" at urban and rhythmic radio formats in North America.

== Music video ==
The music video, which was directed by J. Jesses Smith, was filmed on July 28, 2010, in Long Island and released on August 15, 2010. The video's concept of was inspired by the 1997 comedy film, Def Jam's How to Be a Player. It has cameo appearances from Banks' G-Unit colleagues Tony Yayo and 50 Cent, and the model and actress, Marica Linn.

== Charts ==
Chart (2010)	Peak position
US Hot R&B/Hip-Hop Songs (Billboard)	52

== Release information ==
Country	Date	Format	Label	Ref
United States	June 8, 2010	Digital download	G-Unit Records	
