= I'm So Fly =

Single by Lloyd Banks

from the album The Hunger for More
- Released: July 13, 2004
- Recorded: 2003
- Genre: Hip hop
- Length: 4:00
- Label: G-Unit/Interscope
- Songwriter(s): Chris Lloyd, Tim Mosley, Nate Hills
- Producer(s): Timbaland & Danja

Lloyd Banks singles chronology
"On Fire" (2004)	"I'm So Fly" (2004)	"Karma" (2004)

"I'm So Fly" is the second single released by American rapper Lloyd Banks, from his debut album, The Hunger for More (2004).

== Background ==
"I'm So Fly" was released on July 13, 2004. It was produced by Timbaland and Danja.

== Music video ==
The music video to the song was directed by Jessy Terrero. It features cameos from G-Unit affiliates 50 Cent, Young Buck, DJ Whoo Kid and Olivia.

== Charts ==
Chart (2004)	Peak position
US Bubbling Under Hot 100 Singles (Billboard)	2
US Hot R&B/Hip-Hop Songs (Billboard)	32
US Hot Rap Songs (Billboard)	21
US Rhythmic (Billboard)	26

== Release history ==
Region	Date	Format(s)	Label(s)	Ref.
United States	August 9, 2004	Urban contemporary radio	G-Unit, Interscope	
United States	August 16, 2004	Rhythmic contemporary radio	G-Unit, Interscope	
