= The Course of the Inevitable III: Pieces of My Pain =

Studio album by Lloyd Banks
- Released: April 21, 2023
- Genre: East Coast hip-hop
- Length: 53:28
- Label: Money by Any Means; Empire
- Producer: Haas Almahdi; Cartune Beatz; George Getson; V Don; Tha Jerm

Lloyd Banks chronology
The Course of the Inevitable 2 (2022)	The Course of the Inevitable III: Pieces of My Pain (2023)

Singles from The Course of the Inevitable III: Pieces of My Pain
- 1. "101 Razors" Released: March 23, 2023; 2. "Movie Scenes" Released: March 30, 2023

Professional ratings
Review scores
Source	Rating
HipHopDX	3.8/5
Legends Will Never Die	4/5
RapReviews	7.5/10

The Course of the Inevitable III: Pieces of My Pain is the sixth studio album by American rapper Lloyd Banks. It was released on April 21, 2023, through Money by Any Means. Production was handled by Haas Almahdi, George Getson, Cartune Beatz, Tha Jerm and V Don. It features guest appearances from 38 Spesh, Cormega, Dave East, Method Man, Tony Yayo and Vado.

== Background ==
On March 17, 2023, Banks announced the release of the album and confirmed that C O T I was a trilogy. He also released a trailer revealing the title The Course of the Inevitable III: Pieces of My Pain via Instagram.

On March 24, 2023, Banks revealed the debut single of the album entitled "101 Razors" featuring Method Man. On April 7, 2023, a music video for the single directed by Llama was released.

On April 14, 2023, Banks announced that the album would be released on April 21, 2023.

== Track listing ==
- Credits adapted from Tidal.

The Course of the Inevitable III: Pieces of My Pain track listing
No.	Title	Writer(s)	Producer(s)	Length
1.	"Pieces of My Pain"	Christopher Lloyde; George Getson	George Getson	2:40
2.	"Onyx AMG"	Lloyde; Haas Almahdi	Haas Almahdi	2:32
3.	"Money Machine"	Lloyde; Almahdi	Haas Al-mahdi	3:14
4.	"Cliffhanger"	Lloyde; Tivon Key	V Don	2:33
5.	"101 Razors" (with Method Man)	Lloyd; Clifford Smith Jr.; Key	V Don	3:06
6.	"Movie Scenes"	Lloyde; Getson	George Getson	2:42
7.	"Opened Gates"	Lloyde	Cartune Beatz	3:39
8.	"LSD" (featuring Vado)	Lloyde; Teeyon Isiah Winfree	Cartune Beatz	3:36
9.	"Voices"	Lloyde	Cartune Beatz	3:41
10.	"Red Alert" (featuring 38 Spesh and Tony Yayo)	Lloyde; Justin Christopher Harrell; Marvin Bernard; Almahdi	Haas Almahdi	3:57
11.	"Keys to Success"	Lloyde; Almahdi	Haas Almahdi	3:14
12.	"Automatic Pilot" (with Dave East featuring Vado)	Lloyde; David Lawrence Brewster Jr.; Winfree	Cartune Beatz	4:51
13.	"Invisible"	Lloyde	Cartune Beatz	2:33
14.	"Daddy's Little Girl"	Lloyde	Cartune Beatz	3:48
15.	"Showers"	Lloyde	Tha Jerm	3:25
16.	"Deceitful Intentions" (featuring Cormega)	Lloyde; Cory McKay	Cartune Beatz	3:57
Total length:				53:28
