= Brothers from Another =

Studio album by Young Gunz
- Released: May 24, 2005
- Recorded: 2004–2005
- Genre: Hip hop
- Length: 42:59
- Label: Roc-A-Fella; Def Jam
- Producer: Jay-Z (exec.); Bangladesh; Boola; Chad Hamilton; Kanye West; Swizz Beatz

Young Gunz chronology
Tough Luv (2004)	Brothers from Another (2005)	Rapid Fire (2008)

Singles from Brothers from Another
- 1. "Set It Off" Released: March 29, 2005

Professional ratings
Review scores
Source	Rating
AllMusic	3.5/5 stars
Blender	2/5 stars
Entertainment Weekly	C−
HipHopDX	3/5
Now	NN/NNNNN
Pitchfork	6.8/10
RapReviews	7/10

Brothers from Another is the second studio album by American hip hop duo Young Gunz. It was released on May 24, 2005, via Roc-A-Fella Records. Production was handled by Chad Hamilton, Swizz Beatz, Boola, Bangladesh and Kanye West, with Jay-Z serving as executive producer. It features guest appearances from Pooda Brown, 112, Daz Dillinger, John Legend, Kanye West and Memphis Bleek.

The album peaked at number fifteen on the Billboard 200 and number four on the Top R&B/Hip-Hop Albums. By 2010, it sold 138,000 units in the US. Its lead single "Set It Off" peaked at number 52 on the Hot R&B/Hip-Hop Songs.

== Track listing ==
No.	Title	Writer(s)	Producer(s)	Length
1.	"The Knock Is There"	Christopher Ries; Hanif Muhammad; Chad Hamilton; Belda Baine; Louis Crane	Chad "Wes" Hamilton	2:47
2.	"Set It Off"	Ries; H. Muhammad; Kasseem Dean	Swizz Beatz	3:36
3.	"Don't Keep Me Waiting (Come Back Soon)" (featuring 112)	Ries; H. Muhammad; Hamilton; Ryan Press; Luther Vandross; Marcus Miller	Chad "Wes" Hamilton; Ryan Press (co.)	4:00
4.	"Tonight" (featuring Daz)	Ries; H. Muhammad; Hamilton; Daz Dillinger	Chad "Wes" Hamilton	4:28
5.	"Don't Stop (YG Party)"	Ries; H. Muhammad; Hamilton	Chad "Wes" Hamilton	3:33
6.	"Same Shit Different Day"	Ries; H. Muhammad; Shondrae Crawford	Bangladesh	3:32
7.	"Grown Man, Pt. 2" (featuring Kanye West and John Legend)	Ries; H. Muhammad; Kanye West; Lamont Dozier	Kanye West	3:46
8.	"Beef"	Ries; H. Muhammad; Dean	Swizz Beatz	3:22
9.	"It's the Life" (featuring Pooda Brown)	Ries; H. Muhammad; Hamilton; Tariq Muhammad	Chad "Wes" Hamilton	3:10
10.	"The Way It Goes" (featuring Pooda Brown)	Ries; H. Muhammad; Hamilton; T. Muhammad; Michael Cooper; Felton Pilate	Chad "Wes" Hamilton	3:57
11.	"What We Gotta Do"	Ries; H. Muhammad; Alrad Lewis	Boola	4:00
12.	"We Still Here" (featuring Memphis Bleek)	Ries; H. Muhammad; Hamilton	Chad "Wes" Hamilton	2:48
Total length:				42:59

Sample credits

- "The Knock is There" contains a sample of "She Locked It", performed by the Ohio Players, written by Belda Baine and Louis Crane.
- "Don't Keep Me Waiting" contains a sample of "See Me", performed by Luther Vandross, written by Luther Vandross and Marcus Miller.
- "Grown Man, Pt. 2" contains samples from "Tear Down the Walls", written and performed by Lamont Dozier.
- "The Way It Goes" contains a sample of "Love's Train", performed by Con Funk Shun, written by Michael Cooper and Felton Pilate.

== Personnel ==
- Tony Dawsey – mastering
- Chad "Wes" Hamilton – engineer (1, 3, 4, 6, 9–12)
- Gimel "Young Guru" Keaton – engineer (5, 8), mixing (1–6, 8–10, 12)
- Manny Marroquin – mixing (7)
- TP – engineer (2)
- Shane Woodley – engineer (7)
- Doug Wilson – mixing (11)
- Jeff "Bass" Wuollet – bass guitar (4)

== Charts ==
Chart (2005)	Peak position
US Billboard 200	15
US Top R&B/Hip-Hop Albums (Billboard)	4
US Top Rap Albums (Billboard)	2
