= Start It Up (song) =

Single by Lloyd Banks featuring Kanye West, Fabolous, Swizz Beatz and Ryan Leslie

from the album H.F.M. 2 (The Hunger for More 2)
- Released: November 2, 2010
- Recorded: September 2010
- Genre: Hip hop
- Length: 4:49
- Label: G-Unit; EMI
- Songwriters: Christopher Lloyd; Kanye West; John Jackson; Kasseem Dean; Ryan Leslie; Carl McCormick
- Producer: Cardiak

Lloyd Banks singles chronology
"Any Girl" (2010)	"Start It Up" (2010)	"I Don't Deserve You" (2011)

Kanye West singles chronology
"Monster" (2010)	"Start It Up" (2010)	"Hurricane 2.0" (2010)

Fabolous singles chronology
"Swagger Right" (2010)	"Start It Up" (2010)	"You Be Killin Em" (2010)

Swizz Beatz singles chronology
"Gucci Time" (2010)	"Start It Up" (2010)	"Can a Drummer Get Some" (2011)

Ryan Leslie singles chronology
"You're Not My Girl" (2009)	"Start It Up" (2010)	"So Forgetful" (2011)

"Start It Up" is a song by American hip hop recording artist Lloyd Banks, released on November 2, 2010 as the third single from his third studio album H.F.M. 2 (The Hunger for More 2). The song, which features vocals from fellow American rappers Swizz Beatz, Kanye West, Ryan Leslie and Fabolous, was produced by American music producer Cardiak.

== Background ==
The song originally leaked in the lead-up to the release of The Hunger for More 2, even though it was not released officially, the song still managed to gain airplay, resulting in the song charting on the Billboard Hot R&B/Hip-Hop Songs chart. It was unknown whether the song would be released as a single or not until he confirmed it in an interview on 102 Jamz.

Whilst speaking to MTV News, Banks' said this about the track,

"That was one of the last joints I recorded for my album,”. “Originally it was me and Fab, then I got Kanye, then Swizz was in the city and so was Ryan." "The whole Kanye West thing happened, it was shortly after the tweet that he wrote, the comment he made about me being underrated and should be in everybody's top five. We read that statement, and it kind of took off on its own. I definitely appreciated that. Just for him to say that opens up the eyes that have been watching him [to me]. And from there, it made sense to go into the studio with him. Shortly after that, we went into the studio."

— Lloyd Banks

In an interview with Rap-Up, Banks explained that Swizz Beatz was not originally on the chorus. At first it was thought that Kanye West had produced the track, but it was later confirmed that it was up and coming producer named Cardiak. A testament to the fast-paced music industry in 2010, Banks said, "The difference from that track being me and Fab and having Kanye was 24 hours."

== Remixes ==
The official UK remix, featuring Swizz Beatz, Kanye West, Ryan Leslie, Sway DaSafo and Giggs, was released on December 3, 2010. The official “Extended Version” was released on December 7, 2010. The extended version is the same as the original with the addition of a verse from fellow American rapper Pusha T.

The official remix keeps West's and Fabolous's verses, but adds a verse from Young Jeezy and a new verse from Lloyd Banks.

== Music video ==
In an interview with DJ Whoo Kid on Sirius Radio, Banks confirmed that a music video would be filmed for the song, but a date had not been confirmed. It had been confirmed that Lloyd Banks was shooting his part for the video on November 12, 2010. Via Twitter it was confirmed that the G-Unit Riderz would make a cameo appearance in the video. However it is believed that because of the difficulty of getting the artists together at one time there may be no video.

== Charts ==
Chart (2010–11)	Peak position
US Bubbling Under Hot 100 Singles (Billboard)	5
US Hot R&B/Hip-Hop Songs (Billboard)	52

== Release history ==
Region	Date	Format
United States	November 2, 2010	Digital download
United States	November 30, 2010	Urban radio
