= The Hunger for More =

Studio album by Lloyd Banks
- Released: June 29, 2004
- Recorded: 2003–2004
- Studios: Sony Studios (New York, NY); Spydadome (New York); The Power House at Metropolis Studios (London); The Big House (Farmington, CT); The Hit Factory Criteria (Miami, FL); Right Track Studios (New York, NY); 54 Sound (Detroit, MI); Teamwork Studios (New York, NY)
- Genre: Hip hop
- Length: 55:25
- Labels: Interscope; G-Unit
- Producers: Baby Grand; Black Jeruz; Chad Beatz; Eminem; Greg "Jinx" Doby; Havoc; Hi-Tek; Kwamé; Ron Browz; Scram Jones; Sha Money XL; Thayod Ausar; The Diaz Brothers; Timbaland; Tone Capone

Lloyd Banks chronology
The Hunger for More (2004)	Rotten Apple (2006)

Alternative cover
- Special edition cover

Singles from The Hunger for More
- 1. "On Fire" Released: April 27, 2004; 2. "I'm So Fly" Released: July 13, 2004; 3. "Karma" Released: October 19, 2004

The Hunger for More is the debut solo studio album by American rapper Lloyd Banks. Originally scheduled for a May 25, 2004 release, the album was ultimately released on June 29, 2004, through Interscope Records and 50 Cent's G-Unit Records.

Recording sessions took place at Sony Studios, Spydadome, Right Track Studios and Teamwork Studios in New York, The Power House at Metropolis Studios in London, The Big House in Farmington, The Hit Factory Criteria in Miami, and 54 Sound in Detroit.

Production was handled by Eminem, Sha Money XL, Baby Grand, Black Jeruz, Chad Beat, Greg "Jinx" Doby, Havoc, Hi-Tek, Kwamé, Ron Browz, Scram Jones, Thayod Ausar, The Diaz Brothers and Timbaland, with co-producer Danja and additional producer Luis Resto. It features guest appearances from fellow G-Unit members 50 Cent (who executive produced the album), The Game, Tony Yayo and Young Buck, as well as Nate Dogg, Eminem and Snoop Dogg.

The album debuted atop the Billboard 200 albums chart in the United States, at number two on the Canadian Albums Chart and peaked at number 15 on the UK Albums Chart. It was certified Platinum by the Recording Industry Association of America and Music Canada and Gold by the British Phonographic Industry.

It was supported with three charted singles: "On Fire", "I'm So Fly" and "Karma". Its lead single received a Grammy Award for Best Rap Solo Performance nomination at the 47th Annual Grammy Awards.

== Background ==
=== Concept ===
During an interview Lloyd Banks explained the reason behind naming the album. He said:

When I say The Hunger for More, it could be referring to more success. It could be more money. Or Respect. More power. More understanding. All those things lead up to that hunger for more, because my more isn't everybody else's more. I feel like I made it already, because I got already what everybody on the corners of the neighbourhood I grew up in is striving to get.

=== Recordings ===
We had a studio on the tour bus. I wrote on the road, going through different situations, constantly touring. 50 was out there, Snoop Dogg was out there, Busta Rhymes, Jay-Z, a lot of people and I'm tryin' to find my lane at the same time as goin' through all the ins and outs.

I recorded about 50 tracks and I had 50 choose the tracks for the album. “Chips it down” meaning that when the finances are not there, you realize that you need money for everything, and you know that money can change everything. It is talking about the move from having nothing to having all the money and the cars and jewelry. When I'm doin' records for my album, I'm givin' you the same thing I'm givin' you on the mixtapes, but I'm also givin' material that I don't care about getting an (oooh or wow) at the crowd. I do it to basically to tell you stuff you need to know. You understand. If I said you need to know this is what to expect from my neighborhood its kinda like a message at the same time you see good news travel slower than bad news. Yanno so if you grow up in the suburbs or you out of the country or whatever maybe my personal experiences will make you appreciate your neighborhood better. So it's certain things that when I make a record or my album where I'm tellin' you I don't care about your *oooohs and ahhhhs* I just feel like you need to know this.

During the first week of The Hunger For More's release, a distribution house in Manhattan was robbed of approximately eight boxes of the CDs (200 copies). A New York record store had nearly 100 copies of the CD stolen from its racks by a single perpetrator on the album's first day in stores, though they were later recovered.

== Songs ==
In support of the album, G-Unit/Interscope Records released three singles with accompanying music videos.

Its lead single, "On Fire", was released prior to the album, on April 27, 2004. It peaked at number 8 on the Billboard Hot 100, number 4 on the Hot R&B/Hip-Hop Songs, and number 2 on the Hot Rap Songs in the US. It was nominated for a Grammy Award for Best Rap Solo Performance at the 47th Annual Grammy Awards held on February 13, 2005, but lost to Jay-Z's "99 Problems". On May 19, 2005, the song was certified Gold by the RIAA. The song can be heard in the fifth episode of the third season of TV series The Wire entitled "Straight and True" and in 2005 film Fantastic Four.

The second single off the album, "I'm So Fly", was released on July 13, 2004. It did not make it to the US Billboard Hot 100, however, it peaked at number 2 on the Bubbling Under Hot 100 singles, number 32 on the Hot R&B/Hip-Hop Songs and number 21 on the Hot Rap Songs. Music videos for the first two singles were directed by Jessy Terrero.

The album's third and final single, "Karma", was released on October 19, 2004. It reached number 17 on the Billboard Hot 100, number 9 on the Hot R&B/Hip-Hop Songs and number 6 on the Hot Rap Songs in the US. The music video, directed by Little X, and radio versions of the song features R&B singer Avant instead of Kevin Cossom, who provided additional vocals on its album version.

In 2009, the song "Warrior, Pt. 2" was used in So You Think You Can Dance (American TV series) season 6.

== Critical reception ==
Professional ratings
Aggregate scores
Source	Rating
Metacritic	66/100
Review scores
Source	Rating
AllHipHop	3.5/5 stars
AllMusic	3.5/5 stars
Blender	3/5 stars
E! Online	B−
HipHopDX	4/5
Los Angeles Times	2.5/4 stars
Now	3/5 Ns
RapReviews	8/10
Rolling Stone	3/5 stars
Vibe	3.5/5

The Hunger for More was met with generally favourable reviews from music critics. At Metacritic, which assigns a normalized rating out of 100 to reviews from mainstream publications, the album received an average score of 66 based on ten reviews.

Steve 'Flash' Juon of RapReviews claimed: "while it's not better than 50's national debut or G-Unit's album, it's certainly no worse". AllMusic's David Jeffries called it "another solid release from the crew", and also compared it with G-Unit's previous releases, saying it is "a couple steps down from 50 Cent's Get Rich or Die Tryin' and a step above G-Unit's Beg for Mercy". Rondell Conway of Vibe stated: "while he excels in clever jousting, Banks lacks range and storytelling ability". E! Online reviewer found "the one thing Banks lacks is Fiddy's natural charisma--he's also about eight bulletholes short in the "life-experience department". Dean Kuipers of Los Angeles Times wrote: "though not one of the songs on the album stands out in terms of head-popping new production -- there's not a hit that will transcend the hip-hop hard-core -- each cut is utterly bulletproof, and Banks' lyrics provide a few new twists".

In mixed reviews, Chairman Mao of Blender resumed: "while Banks's wicked wordplay is impressive, his one-liners get him only so far". Jon Caramanica of Rolling Stone concluded: "Banks... raps each verse as if his entire career depends on it".

== Commercial performance ==
In the United States, the album debuted at the top of the Billboard 200, the Top R&B/Hip-Hop Albums and the Top Rap Albums charts, with 434,000 copies sold in its first week of its release. It remained at number-one in the second week, selling close to 164,000 copies. "That's the kind of debut that veteran artists have", says Banks. "That showed me that following 50's moves and studying the way that he played the game had put me in an incredible position". On September 9, 2004, the album was certified platinum by the Recording Industry Association of America for 1 million units sold in America.

The album also debuted at number 2 on the Canadian Albums Chart. In October 2004, the album received a Platinum certification by the Canadian Recording Industry Association for sales of 100,000 copies in Canada.

In the United Kingdom, the album peaked at number 15 on the UK Albums Chart, number 7 on the Official Hip Hop and R&B Albums Chart and number 19 on the Scottish Albums Chart. The album reached its Gold status by the British Phonographic Industry on June 17, 2016.

== Track listing ==
No.	Title	Writer(s)	Producer(s)	Length
1.	"Ain't No Click" (featuring Tony Yayo)	Christopher Lloyd; Marvin Bernard; Kejuan Muchita	Havoc	4:25
2.	"Playboy"	Lloyd; Rondell Turner; Brian Frederick Hines	Ron Browz	4:32
3.	"Warrior"	Lloyd; Eric Banks; Ray Wylie Hubbard; Robert Livingston	Thayod Ausar	2:47
4.	"On Fire"	Lloyd; Curtis Jackson; Kwamé Holland; Marshall Mathers; Luis Resto; Harry Palmer	K1 Mil; Eminem (co.); Luis Resto (add.)	3:07
5.	"I Get High" (featuring 50 Cent and Snoop Dogg)	Lloyd; Jackson; Calvin Broadus; Tony Cottrell	Hi-Tek	4:09
6.	"I'm So Fly"	Lloyd; Timothy Mosley; Nathaniel Hills	Timbaland; Danja (co.)	4:00
7.	"Work Magic" (featuring Young Buck)	Lloyd; David Brown; Marc Shemer	Scram Jones	4:27
8.	"If You So Gangsta"	Lloyd; Chad Dexter Burnette; Michael Clervoix; Derick Prosper	Chad Beat; Sha Money XL	3:31
9.	"Warrior, Pt. 2" (featuring Eminem, 50 Cent and Nate Dogg)	Lloyd; Mathers; Jackson; Nathaniel Hale	Eminem	3:37
10.	"Karma"	Lloyd; Gregory M. Doby; Charles H. Jackson Jr.; Marvin Yancy	Greg "Jinx" Doby	4:38
11.	"When the Chips Are Down" (featuring The Game)	Lloyd; Jayceon Taylor; Robert Brandon Smith; Clervoix; Prosper; Laurence Crème; Kevin Godley	Black Jeruz; Sha Money XL	3:39
12.	"Til the End" (featuring Nate Dogg)	Lloyd; Mathers; Resto	Eminem	5:09
13.	"Die One Day"	Lloyd; Robert A. Adair; David Porter; Ronald Williams	Baby Grand	3:14
14.	"South Side Story"	Lloyd; Hugo Diaz; Luis Diaz; Barry White	The Diaz Brothers	4:10
Total length:				55:25

Bonus tracks
No.	Title	Writer(s)	Producer(s)	Length
15.	"Just Another Day"	Lloyd; Anthony Gilmour; Anthony Hester	Tone Capone	3:31
16.	"Take a Good Look"	Lloyd; Justin Keith Henderson; Clervoix	J-Hen; Sha Money XL (co.)	2:54

Sample credits

- Track 2 contains elements from "Time to Hide" written by Denny Laine and performed by Wings.
- Track 3 contains elements from "Hold On" written by Ray Wylie Hubbard and Robert Livingston and performed by McKendree Spring.
- Track 4 contains elements from "The Champ" written by Harry Palmer.
- Track 10 contains elements from "Inseparable" written by Charles H. Jackson Jr. and Marvin Yancy and performed by Natalie Cole.
- Track 11 contains elements from "The Dean and I" written by Lol Creme and Kevin Godley and performed by 10cc.
- Track 13 contains elements from "All It Takes Is You and Me" written by David Porter and Ronald Williams and performed by The Sweet Inspirations.
- Track 14 contains elements from "Love Serenade (Part 1)" written and performed by Barry White.
- Track 15 contains elements from "Beware of the Man (With the Candy in His Hand)" written by Tony Hester and performed by The Dramatics.

Notes

- Track 12 contains background vocals from Nate Dogg
- The album was also released in a special edition, which featured a bonus track and different packaging (including a CD booklet on dollar bill-style paper). It also included a 25-minute DVD with the video for "My Buddy", a clip for "Smile" and "A Day in the Life of Lloyd Banks".

== Personnel ==
- Christopher "Lloyd Banks" Lloyd – vocals
- Marvin "Tony Yayo" Bernard – vocals (track 1)
- Yves "DJ Whoo Kid" Mondesir – additional vocals (track 2)
- Curtis "50 Cent" Jackson – vocals (tracks: 5, 9), executive producer
- Calvin "Snoop Dogg" Broadus – vocals (track 5)
- David "Young Buck" Brown – vocals (track 7)
- Rhonda "Lady May" Robinson – additional vocals (track 8)
- Marshall "Eminem" Mathers – vocals (track 9), producer (tracks: 9, 12), co-producer (track 4), mixing (tracks: 4, 9, 12)
- Nathaniel "Nate Dogg" Hale – vocals (tracks: 9, 12)
- Kevin "KC" Cossom – additional vocals (track 10)
- Jayceon "The Game" Taylor – vocals (track 11)
- Kejuan "Havoc" Muchita – producer (track 1)
- Rondell "Ron Browz" Turner – producer (track 2)
- Eric "Thayod" Banks – producer (track 3)
- Kwamé "K1 Mil" Holland – producer (track 4)
- Luis Resto – additional producer (track 4)
- Tony "Hi-Tek" Cottrell – producer (track 5)
- Timothy "Timbaland" Mosley – producer (track 6)
- Nathaniel "Danja" Hills – co-producer (track 6)
- Marc "Scram Jones" Shemer – producer (track 7)
- Chad Burnette – producer (track 8)
- Michael "Sha Money XL" Clervoix – producer (tracks: 8, 11), recording (tracks: 11, 12, 14), co-executive producer
- Greg "Jinx" Doby – producer (track 10)
- Robert "Black Jeruz" Smith – producer (track 11)
- Robert A. "Baby Grand" Adair – producer (track 13)
- Hugo Diaz – producer (track 14)
- Luis Diaz – producer (track 14)
- Anthony "Tone Capone" Gilmour – producer (track 15)
- Pat Viala – recording (tracks: 1, 2), mixing (tracks: 1, 2, 7, 8, 10, 11, 13, 15)
- Andy "Red Spyda" Thelusma – recording (track 3)
- Steve Baughman – mixing (tracks: 3, 5)
- Adrian Hall – recording (track 4)
- Steve King – mixing (tracks: 4, 9, 12), recording (track 9)
- Ky Miller – recording (tracks: 5, 6, 9)
- Jimmy Douglass – recording & mixing (track 6)
- Marcella Araica – mixing assistant (track 6)
- Carlisle Young – recording (tracks: 7, 10), mixing (track 14)
- Paul Gregory – recording (tracks: 13, 15)
- Brian "Big Bass" Gardner – mastering
- Sacha Waldman – photography
- Marcus Heisser – A&R
- Otwane Roberts – A&R
- Sheena Curry – A&R

== Charts ==
=== Weekly charts ===
Chart (2004)	Peak position
Australian Albums (ARIA Charts)	51
Australian Urban Albums (ARIA)	10
Belgian Albums (Ultratop Flanders)	83
Canadian Albums (Billboard)	2
Canadian R&B Albums (Nielsen SoundScan)	1
Dutch Albums (Album Top 100)	52
French Albums (SNEP)	37
German Albums (Offizielle Top 100)	45
Irish Albums (IRMA)	36
Scottish Albums (Official Charts)	19
Swiss Albums (Schweizer Hitparade)	65
UK Albums (Official Charts)	15
UK R&B Albums (Official Charts)	7
US Billboard 200	1
US Top R&B/Hip-Hop Albums (Billboard)	1
US Top Rap Albums (Billboard)	1

=== Year-end charts ===
Chart (2004)	Position
US Billboard 200	46
US Top R&B/Hip-Hop Albums (Billboard)	11

== Certifications ==
Region	Certification	Certified units/sales
Canada (Music Canada)	Platinum	100,000^{^}
United Kingdom (BPI)	Gold	100,000^{‡}
United States (RIAA)	Platinum	1,000,000^{^}
^{^} Shipments figures based on certification alone.^{‡} Sales+streaming figures based on certification alone.

== See also ==
- List of Billboard 200 number-one albums of 2004
- List of Billboard number-one R&B/hip-hop albums of 2004
