= I Don't Deserve You =

Single by Lloyd Banks featuring Jeremih

from the album H.F.M. 2 (The Hunger for More 2)
- Released: January 6, 2011
- Recorded: 2010
- Genre: Hip hop; R&B
- Length: 3:52
- Label: G-Unit; EMI
- Songwriters: Christopher Lloyd; Jeremih Felton; Kevin Crowe; Erik Ortiz
- Producer: J.U.S.T.I.C.E. League

Lloyd Banks singles chronology
"Start It Up" (2010)	"I Don't Deserve You" (2011)	"So Forgetful" (2011)

Jeremih singles chronology
"Down on Me" (2010)	"I Don't Deserve You" (2011)	"Do It Like You" (2011)

"I Don't Deserve You" is a song by American hip hop recording artist Lloyd Banks, released as the second single from his third album H.F.M. 2 (The Hunger for More 2) (2010). The song features American R&B singer Jeremih and was produced by J.U.S.T.I.C.E. League. The song was released as a digital download on June 7, 2011 to iTunes and to radio on January 6, 2011.

== Background ==
The song originally leaked while Lloyd Banks was on tour in Europe, due to his email being hacked. The leaked version originally feature Lloyd Banks also on the chorus until it was reported that Jeremih was featured on the song.

It was believed that either "I Don't Deserve You" or "So Forgetful" would be Banks' fourth single from his album. "I Don't Deserve You" was later confirmed as the fourth single from the album by 50 Cent in an interview with MTV News.

== Reception ==
The track received mostly positive reviews from the public, with Spin.com saying it was the best track off the album. All Music also named it as one of the top three tracks on the album.

== Music video ==
The video for the song was shot in New York City and Long Island. The filming mostly took place in a hotel, and it features Jeremih. The video was shot on January 1, 2011 and is directed by Parris. The video also features cameo's from Tony Yayo and 50 Cent. The video premiered on thisis50.com and mtv.com on January 23, 2011. The concept of the video is about Banks' reliving memories of his previous relationship's and eventually moving on. The video also features a montage of Banks late 2010 and early 2011 performances and television appearances.

== Charts ==
=== Weekly charts ===
Chart (2011)	Peak position
US Bubbling Under Hot 100 (Billboard)	20
US Hot R&B/Hip-Hop Songs (Billboard)	33
US Hot Rap Songs (Billboard)	19
US Rhythmic Airplay (Billboard)	36

=== Year-end charts ===
Chart (2011)	Position
US Hot R&B/Hip-Hop Songs (Billboard)	93

== Release information ==
Country	Date	Format	Label	Ref
United States	November 22, 2010	Digital download	G-Unit Records / EMI	
