= Beamer, Benz, or Bentley =

2010 single by Lloyd Banks and Juelz Santana

Single by Lloyd Banks featuring Juelz Santana

from the album H.F.M. 2 (The Hunger for More 2)
- Released: February 9, 2010
- Recorded: 2009
- Genre: Hip hop; club; future bass
- Length: 3:27
- Label: G-Unit
- Songwriters: Christopher Lloyd; LaRon James; Michael Forno
- Producer: Prime

Lloyd Banks singles chronology
"Officer Down" (2009)	"Beamer, Benz, or Bentley" (2010)	"Any Girl" (2010)

Juelz Santana singles chronology
"Back to the Crib" (2009)	"Beamer, Benz, or Bentley" (2010)	"Home Run" (2011)

"Beamer, Benz, or Bentley" is the first official single from Lloyd Banks' third album H.F.M. 2 (The Hunger for More 2), which was released on November 23, 2010. The song was released as a digital download on February 9, 2010. It was added to KAMP-FM in Los Angeles in four days from release.

It was ranked number 37 on the best songs of 2010 by Rolling Stone. Despite the song receiving no major-label backing (due to Banks being dropped from Interscope the previous year), the song was a minor chart success in America, charting at number 49 on the Billboard Hot 100. Due to the moderate success of the single, Interscope attempted to re-sign Banks to the label; however, this failed when Banks announced he would sign to EMI. "Beamer, Benz, or Bentley" was also certified Gold by the RIAA.

== Description ==
The song is about a girl going back to Lloyd Banks' place in one of three of his automobiles, either his BMW, Mercedes-Benz, or Bentley.

The song features Juelz Santana on the second verse and chorus and is produced by Prime. Banks describes the song as a "club record with a lot of energy". Beamer, Benz, or Bentley was released with no major label promotion and reached number 49 on the Billboard Hot 100. In August 2010 the single was certified gold. After the song was certified gold, 50 Cent and Eminem pranked him and then presented him the plate while in backstage at The Home & Home Tour in September 2010.

== Music video ==
The song's music video premiered March 15, 2010 on MTV Jams. The music video is directed by Broadway and features cameos from Maino and Beanie Sigel.

== Remixes ==
"Beamer, Benz, or Bentley (Remix)"

Single by Lloyd Banks featuring Ludacris, The-Dream, Jadakiss, Yo Gotti
- Released: May 12, 2010
- Recorded: 2010
- Genre: Hip hop; club; future bass
- Length: 3:52
- Label: G-Unit
- Songwriters: C. Lloyd, C. Bridges, T. Nash, J. Phillips, M. Mims
- Producer: Prime

Lloyd Banks singles chronology
"Beamer, Benz, or Bentley" (2010)	"Beamer, Benz, or Bentley (Remix)" (2010)

Ludacris singles chronology
"Ride" (2010)	"Beamer, Benz, or Bentley (Remix)" (2010)	"Sex Room" (2010)

=== Official remix ===
Banks has told MTV that the official remix was completed in early May and features upwards of 5-6 rappers. He also stated that there is a very good chance of a few regional remixes. The official remix features Ludacris, The-Dream, Jadakiss, and Yo Gotti. A music video for this remix was shot. Another official remix featured Fabolous on the original beat (Fab states in an interview with ThisIs50.com that Banks contacted him to do the remix).

=== Other remixes and freestyles ===
Giggs, Hodgy Beats, Fabolous, Eminem, Ace Hood, Twista, Ray J, Shorty Mack, Bizarre of D12, Papoose, Cassidy, Red Cafe, Jae Millz, Warren G and JJ Demon have all recorded their own remixes and freestyles to the song. Lil Wayne performed his song Go D.J. over the instrumental. Joe Budden and Royce da 5'9 made a remix named "New York, Jersey Philly" where they diss Benzino and Waka Flocka Flame. Joell Ortiz made a remix named "Nissan, Honda, Chevy" later featuring Jim Jones, also with a music video directed by Dawud Gaston and with cameos from Slaughterhouse. Crooked I made his remix named Tequila, Vodka, Henny. Later the members of Slaughterhouse combined their remixes to form Beamer Benz Bentley (Shady Mix) alluding to their talks to sign to Shady Records. T-Pain's Nappy Boy signed artist Young Cash has also made his own version of the song. Game has collaborated with Black Wall Street artist Mysonne to make their version, "Revolver or the Semi". In this version they diss Jae Millz's version of the track. Maino made a remix known as "Trina, Kim or Nicki", referencing the female rappers Trina, Lil' Kim, and Nicki Minaj. Young Money member, Jae Millz, also recorded a remix called "Polo, Louie, Gucci" alluding to the 3 major fashion designers. Fabolous released his remix to the song on his 2010 mixtape "There Is No Competition 2: The Funeral Service". Dead Prez made a remix named Malcolm Garvey Huey. Winnipeg, MB based Hip-Hop group Winnipeg's Most did a rendition titled "Kush up in my Philly" which was released on their 2010 mixtape "Northside Connection". Two Swiss rappers Al P. and C.mEE made a Remix called "Miller, Jack & Jägi", which succeeded in Swiss clubs and was played even more than the original. Italian rapper Egreen made a Remix called "Fiat, Dacia, Skoda", referring to low cost car brands.

=== Lakers Anthem 2010 ===
DJ Felli Fel used the beat to make "Lakers Anthem 2010" to support the Los Angeles Lakers in the 2010 NBA Finals. The remix features Ray J, Snoop Dogg, The Game, Ice Cube, Chino XL, Roscoe Umali, New Boyz, and Lil Rob.

== Charts and certifications ==
=== Weekly charts ===
Chart (2010)	Peak position
US Billboard Hot 100	49
US Hot R&B/Hip-Hop Songs (Billboard)	15
US Hot Rap Songs (Billboard)	3
US Rhythmic Airplay (Billboard)	21

=== Year-end charts ===
Chart (2010)	Peak position
US Hot R&B/Hip-Hop Songs (Billboard)	78
US Rap Songs (Billboard)	36

=== Certifications ===
Region	Certification	Certified units/sales
United States (RIAA)	Gold	500,000^{*}
^{*} Sales figures based on certification alone.
