= The Champ (The Mohawks song) =

Single by The Mohawks

from the album The Champ
- A-side: The Champ
- B-side: Sound of the Witchdoctors
- Released: 1968
- Recorded: 1968
- Genre: Funk; soul
- Length: 2:42 (The Champ); 2:50 (Sound of the Witchdoctors)
- Label: Pama; Phoenix Music International
- Songwriter: Harry Palmer
- Producer: Harry Palmer

"The Champ" is a song by The Mohawks, a group of session musicians assembled by Alan Hawkshaw. It was originally released in 1968 but failed to chart. However, a re-release made #58 on the UK Singles Chart in 1987 after being sampled many times. The song is based on "Tramp", a 1967 Lowell Fulson record that was covered extensively after its release. Specifically, it is built on Otis Redding and Carla Thomas' cover. The song chants the word "Tramp" rather than "Champ".
