= Tough Luv =

Studio album by Young Gunz
- Released: February 24, 2004
- Recorded: 2003
- Studios: Sony Music Studios (New York, NY); The Studio (Philadelphia, PA); Homebase Studios (Philadelphia, PA); Baseline Studios (New York, NY); Quad Recording (New York, NY)
- Genre: Hip hop
- Length: 1:12:37
- Labels: Roc-A-Fella; Def Jam
- Producers: Jay-Z (exec.); Damon Dash (exec.); Kareem "Biggs" Burke (exec.); Bink!; Boola; Chad Hamilton; Darrell "Digga" Branch; EZ Elpee; Just Blaze; Ruggedness; Scott Storch

Young Gunz chronology
The Chain Gang Vol. 2 (2003)	Tough Luv (2004)	Brothers from Another (2005)

Singles from Tough Luv
- 1. "No Better Love" Released: 2004; 2. "Friday Night" Released: 2004

Professional ratings
Review scores
Source	Rating
AllMusic	3/5 stars
Pitchfork	4.1/10
RapReviews	7/10
Spin	B−

Tough Luv is the debut studio album by American hip hop duo Young Gunz. It was released on February 24, 2004, via Roc-A-Fella Records. Recording sessions took place at Sony Music Studios, Baseline Studios and Quad Recording in New York, and at The Studio and Homebase Studios in Philadelphia. Production was handled by Chad Hamilton, Just Blaze, Bink!, Boola, Darrell "Digga" Branch, Ez Elpee, Ruggedness and Scott Storch, with Jay-Z, Damon Dash and Kareem "Biggs" Burke serving as executive producers. It features guest appearances from Denim, Beanie Sigel, Cam'ron, Chingy, Freeway, Jay-Z, Juelz Santana, Omillio Sparks and Rell.

The album peaked at number three on the Billboard 200 and topped the Top R&B/Hip-Hop Albums and sold 128,000 copies in its first week. By 2010, it sold 421,000 units in the US. Its lead single "No Better Love" peaked at number 36 on the Billboard Hot 100.

== Track listing ==
Track listing per CD liner notes.

No.	Title	Writer(s)	Producer(s)	Length
1.	"Future of the Roc"	Christopher Ries; Hanif Muhammad; Roosevelt Harrell; Thom Bell; Leroy Bell; Casey James	Bink!; Spunk Digga (co.)	2:59
2.	"Roc U" (featuring Beanie Sigel)	Ries; Muhammad; Dwight Grant; Chad Hamilton	Chad Hamilton	4:52
3.	"No Better Love" (featuring Rell)	Ries; Muhammad; Hamilton; Ryan Presson; Luther Vandross; Nat Adderley Jr.	Chad Hamilton; Ryan Press (co.)	3:55
4.	"Friday Night"	Ries; Muhammad; Justin Smith; Darryl McDaniels; Joseph Simmons; Melvin Glover; Nathaniel Glover; Eddie Morris; Sylvia Robinson; Joseph Saddler; Keith Wiggins; Guy Williams; Doug Wimbish	Just Blaze	4:09
5.	"$$$ Girlz" (featuring Juelz Santana)	Ries; Muhammad; LaRon James; Hamilton; Daryl Hall	Chad Hamilton	3:54
6.	"Never Take Me Alive" (featuring Jay-Z)	Ries; Muhammad; Shawn Carter; Scott Storch	Scott Storch	4:59
7.	"Tough Luv" (featuring Denim)	Ries; Muhammad; Smith; Dee Ervin	Just Blaze	5:39
8.	"Grown Man"	Ries; Muhammad; Hamilton; L. Bell; C. James	Chad Hamilton	3:13
9.	"North of Death"	Ries; Hamilton	Chad Hamilton	4:59
10.	"Look in Your Eyes" (featuring Cam'ron)	Ries; Muhammad; Cameron Giles; Melvin Carter	Ruggedness	4:13
11.	"Take It How U Want It" (featuring Sparks)	Ries; Muhammad; Kenneth Johnson; Hamilton	Chad Hamilton	5:10
12.	"That's Right"	Muhammad; Alrad Lewis	Boola	4:31
13.	"Parade" (featuring Freeway)	Ries; Muhammad; Hamilton; Presson; Norman Whitfield	Chad Hamilton; Ryan Press (co.)	4:31
14.	"Time"	Ries; Muhammad; Hamilton; Presson; Bob Reneu	Chad Hamilton; Ryan Press (co.)	3:46
15.	"Life We Chose" (featuring Denim)	Ries; Muhammad; R. Stafford; Hamilton; Presson; Burt Bacharach; Hal David	Chad Hamilton; Shane Boog (co.); Ryan Press (co.)	4:13
16.	"Problemz"	Ries; Muhammad; Lamont Porter	Ez Elpee; The Thorobreads (add.)	3:12
17.	"Can't Stop, Won't Stop Remix" (featuring Chingy)	Ries; Muhammad; Howard Bailey; Darrell Branch; Dwight Myers; Marlon Williams; Leo Nocentelli; Joseph Modeliste; Art Neville; George Porter Jr.; M. Glover; N. Glover; Morris; Wiggins; G. Williams	Darrell "Digga" Branch	4:22
Total length:				1:12:37

Sample credits

- Track 1 contains elements of "(Do It, Do It) No One Does It Better" by The Spinners.
- Track 3 contains a sample of "Better Love" by Luther Vandross.
- Track 4 contains interpolations of "Peter Piper" by Run-DMC and "Flash to the Beat" by Grandmaster Flash and the Furious Five.
- Track 5 contains a sample of "Rich Girl" by Hall & Oates.
- Track 7 contains an interpolation of "I'd Rather Share You" written by D. Ervin.
- Track 8 contains a sample of "Don't Stop Loving Me Now" by L.T.D.
- Track 13 contains a sample of "I Need You" by The Temptations.
- Track 14 contains a master sample use of the original recording of "All I Need Is Time" by First Choice.
- Track 15 contains a sample of "(They Long to Be) Close to You" by Isaac Hayes.
- Track 17 contains interpolations of "Gyrlz, They Love Me" by Heavy D and "Superrappin'" by Grandmaster Flash and the Furious Five.

== Personnel ==
Personnel per CD liner notes.

- Christopher "Young Chris" Ries – vocals
- Hanif "Neef Buck" Muhammad – vocals
- Dwight "Beanie Sigel" Grant – vocals (track 2)
- Gerrell "Rell" Gaddis – vocals (track 3)
- LaRon "Juelz Santana" James – vocals (track 5)
- Shawn "Jay-Z" Carter – vocals (track 6), executive producer
- Denim – vocals (tracks: 7, 15)
- Cameron "Cam'ron" Giles – vocals (track 10)
- Kenneth "Omillio Sparks" Johnson – vocals (track 11)
- Leslie "Freeway" Pridgen – vocals (track 13)
- Howard "Chingy" Bailey – vocals (track 17)
- Steve Tirpak – trumpet (track 1)
- Emma Kummrow – violin (track 1)
- Igor Szwec – violin (track 1)
- Gloria Justen – violin (track 1)
- Larry Gold – cello, additional strings and horns (track 1)
- E-Bass – keyboards and guitars (tracks: 4, 7)
- Matt McCarrin – additional keyboards (track 9)
- J. I. of Team PB – additional vocals (track 10)
- Cosmic Kev – additional scratches (track 13)
- Roosevelt "Bink!" Harrell III – producer (track 1)
- Spunk Digga – co-producer (track 1)
- Shane "Bermuda" Woodley – recording (tracks: 1, 3–5, 7, 10, 12, 14)
- Jeff Chestek – recording (track 1)
- Dragan "Chach" Cacinovic – mixing (tracks: 1, 3, 5, 9, 10, 16, 17)
- Chad Hamilton – producer & recording (tracks: 2, 3, 5, 8, 9, 11, 13–15)
- Doug Wilson – mixing (tracks: 2, 8, 11, 13–15)
- Ryan Presson – co-producer (tracks: 3, 13–15)
- Justin "Just Blaze" Smith – producer (tracks: 4, 7)
- Ken Lewis – mixing (tracks: 4, 7)
- Scott Storch – producer (track 6)
- Gimel "Young Guru" Keaton – recording (track 6), mixing (track 12)
- Kam Houff – mixing (track 6)
- Melvin "Ruggedness" Carter – producer (track 10)
- Alrad "Boola" Lewis – producer (track 12)
- Caveman – recording (track 13)
- Shane Boog – co-producer (track 15)
- Lamont "Ez Elpee" Porter – producer (track 16)
- The Thorobreads – additional producer(s) (track 16)
- Carlisle Young – recording (tracks: 16, 17)
- Darrell "Digga" Branch – producer (track 17)
- Tony Dawsey – mastering
- Damon "Dame" Dash – executive producer
- Kareem "Biggs" Burke – executive producer
- Andrew Huggins – recording administrator
- Eric Weissman – sample clearance agent
- Dawud West – art direction, design
- Mark Mann – photography
- Oluwaseye Olusa – additional photography
- Patrick Reynolds – A&R administrator
- Darcell Lawrence – A&R direction
- Darrin Chandler – A&R direction
- Ramses Francois – A&R coordinator
- Travis Cummings – A&R coordinator
- Gary "Big Face" Bien-Aime – A&R
- Shalik Berry – A&R
- Sherman Dudley – management
- Jay Brown – management
- Amber Noble – marketing
- Girard Hunt – marketing
- Shari Bryant – marketing
- Jennifer Justice – legal

== Charts ==
=== Weekly charts ===
Chart (2004)	Peak position
US Billboard 200	3
US Top R&B/Hip-Hop Albums (Billboard)	1

=== Year-end charts ===
Chart (2004)	Position
US Top R&B/Hip-Hop Albums (Billboard)	52
