= Olivia discography =

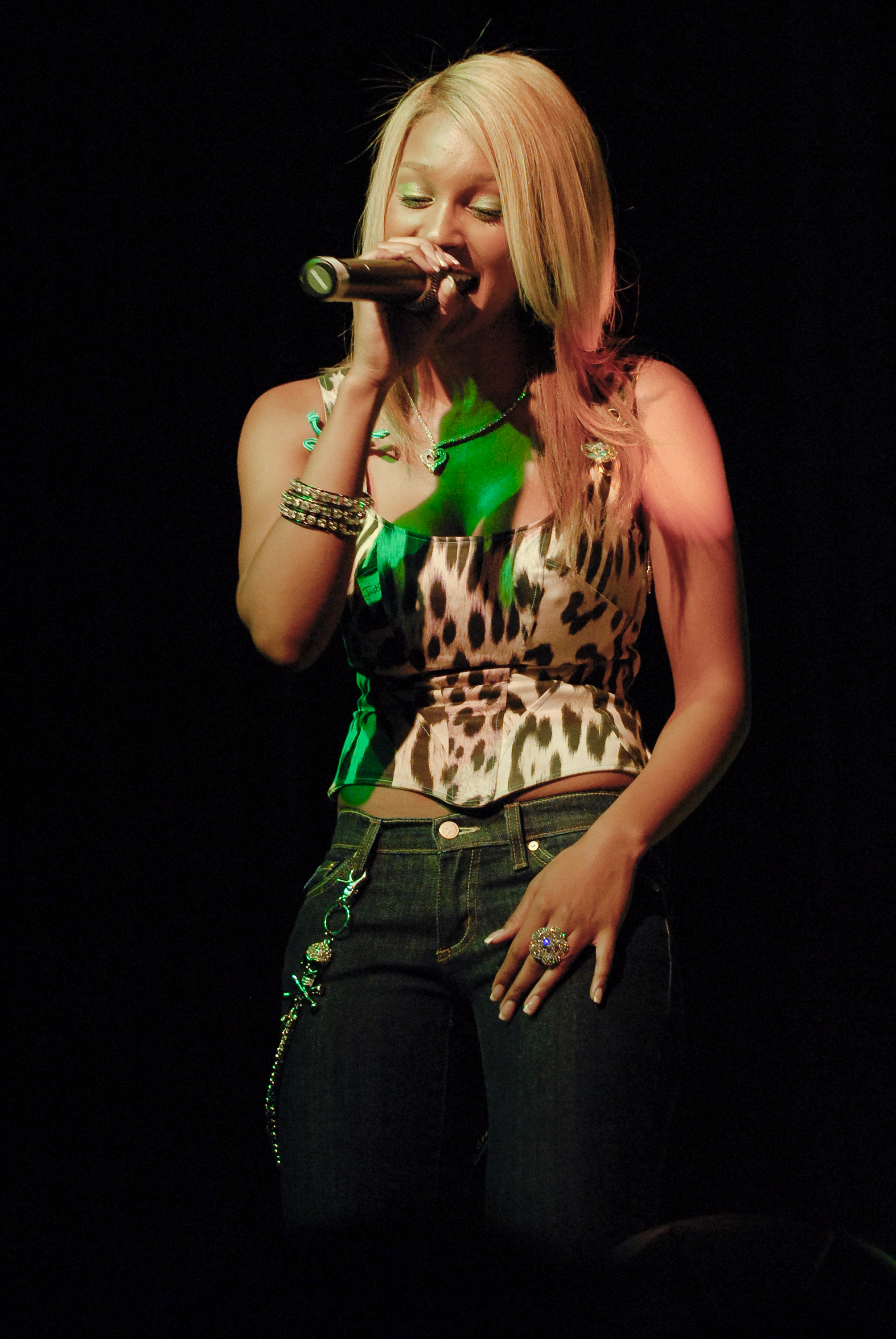
- Olivia performing in July 2007.
- Studio albums: 1
- Singles: 11
- Music videos: 5
- Unreleased albums: 2
- Featured singles: 4

The discography of American R&B singer Olivia Longott, who performs under the mononym Olivia, consists of two studio albums, fifteen singles, four of which she performs as the featured artist, and five music videos.

== Albums ==
=== Studio albums ===
List of albums, with selected chart positions
Title	Album details	Peak chart positions	
Title	Album details	US	US R&B
Olivia	Released: June 2, 2001; Label: J; Format: CD, digital download	55	22
You Are	Released: August 30, 2024; Label: Perfectly Pitched; Format: Digital download, streaming	—	—

=== Miscellaneous ===
List of miscellaneous albums, with selected information
Title	Details	Notes
Behind Closed Doors	Released: 2005 (Shelved); Label: G-Unit, Interscope; Format: CD	

== Mixtapes ==
List of mixtapes
Title	Album details
Under the Radar	Released: April 28, 2010; Label: Dollaz Unlimited; Format: Digital download
Love & Hip Hop	Released: February 21, 2011; Label: Dollaz Unlimited; Format: Digital download
From Olivia with Love	Released: February 20, 2012; Label: Dollaz Unlimited; Format: Digital download

== Singles ==
=== As lead artist ===
List of singles as a lead artist, with selected chart positions and certifications, showing year released and album name
Title	Year	Peak chart positions					Certifications	Album
Title	Year	US	US R&B	US Rap	US Rhyth.	CAN	Certifications	Album
"Bizounce"	2001	15	4	—	12	16		Olivia
"Are U Capable"	2001	—	— (Note: "Are U Capable" did not enter the Hot R&B/Hip-Hop Songs chart, but peaked at number 24 on the Bubbling Under R&B/Hip-Hop Songs chart.)	—	—	—		Olivia
"Twist It" (featuring Lloyd Banks)	2005	89	50	—	—	—		Non-album singles
"So Sexy"	2005	60	30	—	—	—		Non-album singles
"Best Friend" (with 50 Cent)	2006	35	22	10	10	—	RIAA: Platinum; RMNZ: 3× Platinum	Get Rich or Die Tryin' (soundtrack)
"December"	2011	—	79	—	—	—		Non-album singles
"Walk Away"	2011	—	— (Note: "Walk Away" did not enter the Hot R&B/Hip-Hop Songs chart, but peaked at number one on the Bubbling Under R&B/Hip-Hop Songs chart.)	—	—	—		Non-album singles
"Where Do I Go from Here"	2013	—	— (Note: "Where Do I Go from Here" did not enter the Hot R&B/Hip-Hop Songs chart, but peaked at number 18 on the R&B Digital Song Sales chart.)	—	—	—		Non-album singles
"Animal Attraction"	2016	—	—	—	—	—		Non-album singles
"Join Me"	2020	—	—	—	—	—		You Are
"No Permission"	2022	—	—	—	—	—		You Are
"Solo" (with K.D.)	2024	—	—	—	—	—		Non-album single
"Venom"	2026	—	—	—	—	—		TBA
"Shining Girl"	2026	—	—	—	—	—		TBA
"—" denotes a recording that did not chart or was not released in that territory.

=== As featured artist ===
List of singles as a featured artist, with selected chart positions and certifications, showing year released and album name
Title	Year	Peak chart positions										Certifications	Album
Title	Year	US	US R&B	US Rap	AUS	BEL (FL)	GER	NLD	NZ	SWI	UK	Certifications	Album
"Candy Shop" (50 Cent featuring Olivia)	2005	1	1	1	3	1	1	4	2	1	4	RIAA: 5× Platinum; ARIA: Platinum; BPI: 2× Platinum; BVMI: 5× Gold; RMNZ: 3× Platinum	The Massacre
"Wild 2nite" (Shaggy featuring Olivia)	2005	—	—	—	—	— (Note: "Wild 2nite" did not enter the Flanders Ultratop 50, but peaked at number eight on the Ultratip chart.)	40	59	—	26	61		Clothes Drop
"Chaise Électrique" (Fally Ipupa featuring Olivia)	2009	—	—	—	—	—	—	—	—	—	—		Arsenal des Belles Mélodies
"The Man in 3B" (Genius Klub featuring Olivia)	2015	—	—	—	—	—	—	—	—	—	—		Non-album single
"—" denotes a recording that did not chart or was not released in that territory.

=== Promotional singles ===
List of promotional singles, showing year released and album name
Title	Year	Album
"You Got the Damn Thing"	2001	Olivia
"Hold You Down" (Jim Jones featuring Olivia)	2011	Non-album single
"One More Chance" (featuring Papa Cheche and Boy Young)	2020	You Are

== Guest appearances ==
List of non-single guest appearances, with other performing artists, showing year released and album name
Title	Year	Other artist(s)	Album
"Genius E Dub"	2001	Erick Sermon	Music
"Seems to Be"	2003	Avant	Private Room
"All Eyez on Us"	2004	DJ Whoo Kid	G-Unit Radio Part 5: All Eyez on Us
"You Can Have Me"	2004	G-Unit	G-Unit Radio Part 5: All Eyez on Us
"Unconditionally"	2004	G-Unit	Barbershop 2: Back in Business soundtrack
"All"	2004	None	Barbershop 2: Back in Business soundtrack
"Private Party"	2004	None	Barbershop 2: Back in Business soundtrack
"So Amazing"	2005	50 Cent	The Massacre
"We Don't Give a Fuck"	2005	Tony Yayo, 50 Cent, Lloyd Banks	Thoughts of a Predicate Felon
"We Both Think Alike"	2005	50 Cent	Get Rich or Die Tryin' soundtrack
"Cloud 9"	2005	50 Cent	Get Rich or Die Tryin' soundtrack
"G-Shit"	2006	Lil Scrappy	Bred 2 Die, Born 2 Live
"Better"	2012	Fred the Godson	Gordo Frederico
"Close to You"	2012	Fred the Godson	Gordo Frederico
"Forgettable"	2015	Project 46	Beautiful
"Poison"	2025	Tanasha Donna	—N/a
"Candy Shop Remix"	2025	Crankdat	—N/a

== Music videos ==
List of music videos, with directors, showing year released
Title	Year	Director(s)
"Bizounce"	2001	Marcus Raboy
"Are U Capable"	2001	Marcus Raboy
"Candy Shop" (50 Cent featuring Olivia)	2005	Jessy Terrero
"Twist It" (featuring Lloyd Banks)	2005	50 Cent
"So Sexy"	2005	Marcus Raboy
"Wild 2nite" (Shaggy featuring Olivia)	2005	Director X
"Best Friend (Remix)" (50 Cent and Olivia)	2006	Marcus Raboy
"Chaise Electrique" (Fally Ipupa featuring Olivia)	2009	—N/a
"December"	2011	Gee-Lock; King Smij
"Walk Away"	2012	Gee-Lock
"Love Like This (Remix)" (featuring Tank)	2013	Ronald Reid; Hassan Rice

Guest appearances
Title	Year	Artist(s)
"Smile"	2004	G-Unit
"On Fire"	2004	Lloyd Banks
"Let Me In"	2004	Young Buck featuring 50 Cent
"I'm So Fly"	2004	Lloyd Banks
"Look at Me Now / Bonafide Hustler"	2004	Young Buck featuring Kon Artis
"Shorty Wanna Ride"	2004	Young Buck
"Karma"	2004	Lloyd Banks featuring Avant
"How We Do"	2004	The Game featuring 50 Cent
"Just a Lil Bit"	2005	50 Cent
"So Seductive"	2005	Tony Yayo featuring 50 Cent
"Curious"	2005	Tony Yayo featuring Joe
"Outta Control"	2005	50 Cent featuring Mobb Deep
"Hustler's Ambition"	2005	50 Cent
"Window Shopper"	2005	50 Cent
