= List of European number-one hits of 2005 =

This is a list of the European Hot 100 Singles and European Top 100 Albums number ones of 2005, as published by Billboard magazine.

== Chart history ==
Key
†	Indicates best-performing single and album of 2005

Issue date	Song	Artist	Album	Artist	Ref.
5 January	"Do They Know It's Christmas?"	Band Aid 20	Greatest Hits	Robbie Williams	
12 January	"Call on Me"	Eric Prydz	Greatest Hits	Robbie Williams	
19 January	"Call on Me"	Eric Prydz	Greatest Hits	Robbie Williams	
26 January	"Call on Me"	Eric Prydz	American Idiot †	Green Day	
2 February	"Numb/Encore"	Jay-Z and Linkin Park	American Idiot †	Green Day	
9 February	"Like Toy Soldiers"	Eminem	American Idiot †	Green Day	
16 February	"Like Toy Soldiers"	Eminem	American Idiot †	Green Day	
23 February	"Get Right"	Jennifer Lopez	American Idiot †	Green Day	
2 March	"Get Right"	Jennifer Lopez	American Idiot †	Green Day	
9 March	"Get Right"	Jennifer Lopez	Rebirth	Jennifer Lopez	
16 March	"Get Right"	Jennifer Lopez	The Massacre	50 Cent	
23 March	"Get Right"	Jennifer Lopez	Hotel	Moby	
30 March	"Let Me Love You"	Mario	Hotel	Moby	
6 April	"Let Me Love You"	Mario	The Massacre	50 Cent	
13 April	"Let Me Love You"	Mario	Hotel	Moby	
20 April	"Let Me Love You"	Mario	The Massacre	50 Cent	
27 April	"Let Me Love You"	Mario	It's Time	Michael Bublé	
4 May	"Candy Shop"	50 Cent featuring Olivia	Devils & Dust	Bruce Springsteen	
11 May	"Signs"	Snoop Dogg featuring Charlie Wilson and Justin Timberlake	Devils & Dust	Bruce Springsteen	
18 May	"Candy Shop"	50 Cent featuring Olivia	Devils & Dust	Bruce Springsteen	
25 May	"Lonely"	Akon	Mezmerize	System of a Down	
1 June	"Lonely"	Akon	Demon Days	Gorillaz	
8 June	"Lonely"	Akon	Monkey Business	The Black Eyed Peas	
15 June	"Lonely"	Akon	X&Y	Coldplay	
22 June	"Axel F" †	Crazy Frog	X&Y	Coldplay	
29 June	"Axel F" †	Crazy Frog	X&Y	Coldplay	
6 July	"Axel F" †	Crazy Frog	X&Y	Coldplay	
13 July	"Axel F" †	Crazy Frog	X&Y	Coldplay	
20 July	"Axel F" †	Crazy Frog	X&Y	Coldplay	
27 July	"Axel F" †	Crazy Frog	X&Y	Coldplay	
3 August	"Axel F" †	Crazy Frog	X&Y	Coldplay	
10 August	"Axel F" †	Crazy Frog	X&Y	Coldplay	
17 August	"Axel F" †	Crazy Frog	X&Y	Coldplay	
24 August	"Axel F" †	Crazy Frog	X&Y	Coldplay	
31 August	"Axel F" †	Crazy Frog	X&Y	Coldplay	
7 September	"You're Beautiful"	James Blunt	X&Y	Coldplay	
14 September	"Don't Cha"	The Pussycat Dolls featuring Busta Rhymes	A Bigger Bang	The Rolling Stones	
21 September	"Don't Cha"	The Pussycat Dolls featuring Busta Rhymes	A Bigger Bang	The Rolling Stones	
28 September	"Don't Cha"	The Pussycat Dolls featuring Busta Rhymes	Have a Nice Day	Bon Jovi	
5 October	"Don't Cha"	The Pussycat Dolls featuring Busta Rhymes	Have a Nice Day	Bon Jovi	
12 October	"Tripping"	Robbie Williams	You Could Have It So Much Better	Franz Ferdinand	
19 October	"Tripping"	Robbie Williams	Back to Bedlam	James Blunt	
26 October	"Tripping"	Robbie Williams	Playing the Angel	Depeche Mode	
2 November	"Push the Button"	Sugababes	Intensive Care	Robbie Williams	
9 November	"Push the Button"	Sugababes	Intensive Care	Robbie Williams	
16 November	"Hung Up"	Madonna	Intensive Care	Robbie Williams	
23 November	"Hung Up"	Madonna	Confessions on a Dance Floor	Madonna	
30 November	"Hung Up"	Madonna	Confessions on a Dance Floor	Madonna	
7 December	"Hung Up"	Madonna	Confessions on a Dance Floor	Madonna	
14 December	"Hung Up"	Madonna	Confessions on a Dance Floor	Madonna	
21 December	"Hung Up"	Madonna	Intensive Care	Robbie Williams	
28 December	"Hung Up"	Madonna	Intensive Care	Robbie Williams	
