= Disco Inferno (50 Cent song) =

2004 Single by 50 Cent

Single by 50 Cent

from the album The Massacre
- Released: December 21, 2004
- Recorded: 2004
- Genre: Hip hop
- Length: 3:34
- Label: Interscope; Shady; Aftermath
- Songwriters: Curtis Jackson; Teraike Crawford; Phillip Pitts
- Producers: C. Styles; Bang Out

50 Cent singles chronology
"How We Do" (2004)	"Disco Inferno" (2004)	"Hate It or Love It" (2005)

"Disco Inferno" is a song recorded by American rapper 50 Cent for his second studio album The Massacre (2005). It was released as the lead single from the album on December 21, 2004, by Interscope Records, Shady Records and Aftermath Entertainment. It was a success nationwide, peaking at number three on the U.S. Billboard Hot 100.

== Background ==
Released in November 2004, the single debuted at #54 and peaked at #3 on the Billboard Hot 100 chart, becoming 50 Cent's fourth solo top-ten song on the chart and sixth overall. "Disco Inferno" was certified Gold by the RIAA. The song was produced by C. Styles & Bang Out. The song was also nominated for Best Rap Solo Performance at the Grammy Awards of 2006, but lost to Kanye West's "Gold Digger". This song is featured in DJ Hero.

== Reception ==
Julianne Escobedo Shepherd of Pitchfork negatively compared "Disco Inferno" to 50 Cent's previous work, describing it and follow-up single "Candy Shop" as "flaccid reprises of other tracks both in beats and in timbre".

== Track listing ==
- 12" vinyl
1. "Disco Inferno" (explicit) – 3:34
2. "Disco Inferno" (clean) – 3:34
3. "Disco Inferno" (instrumental) – 3:34
4. "Disco Inferno" (acapella) – 3:28
- CD single
1. "Disco Inferno" (explicit) – 3:34
2. "Window Shopper" – 2:38
3. "Best Friend" (featuring Olivia) – 4:08
4. "Disco Inferno" (ringtone) – 0:38

== Charts ==
=== Weekly charts ===
Weekly chart performance for "Disco Inferno"
Chart (2005)	Peak position
Czech Republic (Rádio – Top 100)	32
Scottish Singles Sales (Official Charts)	86
UK Singles (Official Charts)	87
UK Hip Hop/R&B (Official Charts)	18
US Billboard Hot 100	3
US Hot R&B/Hip-Hop Songs (Billboard)	4
US Hot Rap Songs (Billboard)	3
US Pop Airplay (Billboard)	8

=== Year-end charts ===
Year-end chart performance for "Disco Inferno"
Chart (2005)	Position
Russia Airplay (TopHit)	165
UK Urban (Music Week)	14
US Billboard Hot 100	11
US Hot R&B/Hip-Hip Songs (Billboard)	19

== Certifications ==
Certifications and sales for "Disco Inferno"
Region	Certification	Certified units/sales
Brazil (Pro-Música Brasil)	Platinum	60,000^{*}
Denmark (IFPI Danmark)	Gold	45,000^{‡}
New Zealand (RMNZ)	Platinum	30,000^{‡}
United Kingdom (BPI)	Silver	200,000^{‡}
United States (RIAA)	2× Platinum	2,000,000^{‡}
United States (RIAA) Mastertone	Gold	500,000^{*}
^{*} Sales figures based on certification alone.^{‡} Sales+streaming figures based on certification alone.

== Release history ==
Release dates and formats for "Disco Inferno"
Region	Date	Format(s)	Label(s)	Ref.
United States	December 21, 2004	Digital download	Interscope; Shady; Aftermath	
United States	January 11, 2005	12-inch vinyl	Interscope; Shady; Aftermath	
