= Cozier =

Cozier is a surname. Notable people with the surname include:

- Jimmy Cozier Sr. (born 1954), American jazz musician
- Jimmy Cozier (born 1977), American soul musician
- Mac Cozier (born 1973), American expatriate soccer player
- Tony Cozier (1940–2016), Barbadian journalist, writer, and radio commentator

== See also ==
- Crozier (surname)
