= Olivia (Olivia album) =

Studio album by Olivia
- Released: May 15, 2001
- Genre: R&B
- Length: 49:10
- Label: J; BMG
- Producer: Prince Charles Alexander; Douglas Allen; Rufus Blaq; David "Pic" Conley; Fanatic; Rob Fusari; Fran Lover; Spydaman; Joshua P. Thompson; The Underdogs; Warren Wilson

Olivia chronology
Olivia (2001)	You Are (2024)

Singles from Olivia
- 1. "Bizounce" Released: January 30, 2001; 2. "Are U Capable" Released: June 12, 2001

Olivia is the debut studio album by American singer and songwriter Olivia. It was released on May 15, 2001, through J Records. As the first artist signed to the record label, Olivia was referred to as "the First Lady of J". Olivia is an R&B album with elements of hip hop, jazz, and pop. Its lyrics revolve around sexuality and romance. Critics noticed two distinct tones on the album, which Olivia identified as softer R&B alongside harder hip hop sounds. Guest vocals are provided by Petey Pablo and Jimmy Cozier. Olivia wrote six of the album's twelve tracks where she sings and raps.

The album received mixed reviews from critics. It peaked at number 55 on the Billboard 200 and at number 22 on the Top R&B/Hip-Hop Albums charts. Two singles—"Bizounce" and "Are U Capable"—were released from the album. "Bizounce" reached number fifteen on the Billboard Hot 100 and number four on the Billboard Hot R&B/Hip-Hop Songs chart. It peaked at number sixteen on the Canadian Singles Chart. Olivia did extensive promotion for the album which included television performances, live shows, and a tour leading up to the album's release. Following its release, Olivia was removed from J; she later criticized its founder Clive Davis for being too controlling and forcing her into a bad girl image; he denied these claims.

== Background and recording ==
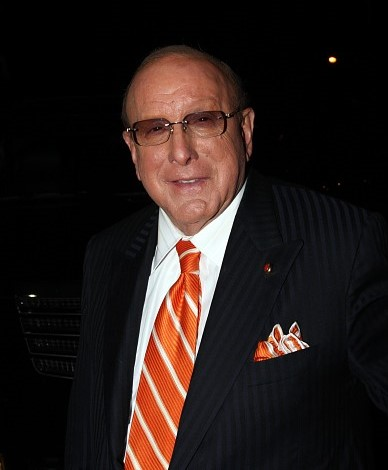
Clive Davis (pictured in 2007) signed Olivia as the first artist to his record label J.

Olivia recorded a demo tape at Tallest Tree Records, a recording studio where she had a production deal. It was produced by songwriter Joshua Thompson who was introduced to Olivia by producer Warren Wilson. After she held a showcase at the China Club, a New York venue, which was attended by Timbaland and Jay-Z, Thompson's manager arranged for her to meet with Arista executives, including its vice president Keith Naftaly. Olivia then auditioned for Clive Davis in August 2000 with a performance of the gospel hymn "His Eye Is on the Sparrow". The audition took place in Davis' living room, and he played her demo for J executives who responded with applause. The same day, Davis offered Olivia a record deal with J which she signed after they shared "a little prayer". Davis said that Olivia had "absolutely knocked [him] out". He described her as having "flavor, style, and attitude".

After obtaining the record contract, Olivia ended her deal with Tallest Tree Records. At age 17, she was the first artist attached to the record label, earning her the nickname "the First Lady of J". Olivia was recorded in various recording studios, including Right Track Studios, in Newport News, West Orange, and Los Angeles. Olivia has co-writing credits on six of the album's twelve songs. She also worked in a suite in New York's Waldorf Astoria Hotel where J was headquartered. In a 2001 Billboard article, she said Davis encouraged her to "explore every part of [herself] on this album". She described it as containing "variety" and having "a whole bunch of elements" that reflects her make up, though she said that she wanted it to be cohesive. She explained: "You won't get lost, though, because each track coincides with the other."

In a 2001 Vibe article, Olivia referred to her musical style as "R&B with a strong hip hop flava". Growing up, Olivia had tried rapping under the nickname "O-Lovely" with her brother and friends. J executive Ron Gillyard described her as a singer, songwriter, and a rapper, as well as "the real deal". Olivia said that she had little experience with the album's more explicit content. During a 2011 interview, she said since her time at J, she always wanted to be "a voice for the women" through her music.

== Composition and lyrics ==
Olivia is a R&B album consisting of twelve tracks. Critics had varying opinions on its influences. According to MTV News' Shaheem Reid, the album features "R&B with elements of jazz and hip-hop". Billboard's Richard B. Henderson referred to the songs as "a mixture of rap, R&B, and pop". The Morning Call's Len Righi wrote the compositions were "sweet instrumental R&B" similar to those for Alicia Keys. Olivia focuses on songs about infidelity and seduction, leading some commentators to notice a split in its tone. Righi characterized the first ten songs as "dreary complaints" with "a mercenary attitude" before transitioning into music that was "girlish and even gooey". Vibe's Dimitri Ehrlich wrote Olivia delivered "an X-rated MC's attitude to the romantic tales of an R&B diva". About these two concepts, Olivia said she had a "sweet side" when singing and a "hard side" while rapping.

In the opening track "Bizounce", Olivia encourages women to leave unhealthy relationships with lyrics such as: "I can't take this shit no more / Picture frame broken daddy 'cause I can't trust you / I'm ridin' high now / So nigga fuck you." Throughout the song, Olivia dismisses her partner by singing "Nigga, fuck you". Henderson noted the instrumental was "synthed-up", and AllMusic's Jon Azpiri said there was a strong contrast between its "seductive music and brutally frank lyrics". For the second song, "Are U Capable", Olivia raps and sings about whether or not a partner could sexually satisfy her. The lyrics include: "Can you kiss below the border while I run the camcorder". The third track, "You Got the Damn Thing", is an uptempo track with "pop nuances", followed by "Silly Bitch in Love", a ballad, where Olivia blames herself for her partner's mistreatment. It features the lines: "You had other bitches in my car / ...nigga, you ain't knowing you was fucking with a star". Music critics identified "When 2 Souls Touch", "It's On Again", and "Lower 2 My Heart" as representing Olivia's sensuality.

== Release and promotion ==
"Bizounce" was released as the album's lead single in 2001 supported by a music video directed by Marcus Raboy. It reached number fifteen on the Billboard Hot 100 and number four on the Billboard Hot R&B/Hip-Hop Songs chart; it was Olivia's highest-charting single until her 2005 collaboration with 50 Cent on "Candy Shop" topped the Billboard Hot 100. The single peaked at number sixteen on the Canadian Singles Chart. "Bizounce" received a positive response from critics. A Billboard reviewer praised Olivia as "ha[ving] the mouth of a bad girl and the voice of an angel" and the potential to be "a bona fide R&B singer". SongQuarters' Paulina Bozek wrote that the song established her reputation as a "powerful R&B/rap debutante". Mulvey of NME commended the single as giving a "steely boot to a crap lover" in the style of TLC, Kelis, and Eve. Prior to the release and success of "Candy Shop", Fred Bronson of Billboard viewed Olivia as a one-hit wonder with "Bizounce" as her only previous success.

Prior to the album's release, she performed "Bizounce" on Soul Train, BET, MTV's hip-hop video block Sucker Free (known at the time as DFX), and The Source Sound Lab. On February 15, 2001, she embarked on a promotional tour, leading up to the release date on May 15, 2001. The album was originally scheduled for March 2001 and May 10, 2001. Explicit and clean versions of the album were issued on cassette and CD; a bonus track ("Under New Conditions") was included on the Japanese edition.

In the United States, Olivia debuted at number 55 on the Billboard 200 chart for the week of June 2, 2001. The next week, it fell to number 103 and continued falling until it dropped off the chart for the week of July 14. The album debuted at number 22 on the Billboard Top R&B/Hip-Hop Albums chart for the week of June 2 before falling from the top 25 the following week.. The album would later be certified gold in the U.S in January 2002.

Despite reports "You Got the Damn Thing" would be the second single, "Are U Capable" was released instead. It was promoted through a Marcus Raboy-directed music video. Billboard's Rashaun Hall felt it "may be the song that sets her career ablaze". A remix of "You Got the Damn Thing" was released separately and treated as the album's third and final single. In 2014, Olivia said she wanted "It's On Again" to be a single, and described it as one of her favorite songs from the album; she said it "makes me feel like I'm on a deserted island, just me and my boo with cherry blossoms blowing in the wind".

== Critical reception ==
Professional ratings
Review scores
Source	Rating
AllMusic	2.5/5 stars
Entertainment Weekly	B−
Q	3/5 stars

The album received a mixed response from critics. A Honey reviewer praised Olivia as a "real voice" in hip hop soul, and a CMJ contributor commended the album as "unique and ground-breaking". A Q magazine reviewer wrote that Olivia was "well-versed in the not always noble art of the R&B ballad" and the music had "a list of saucy demands that would make Lil' Kim blush". In a The Source review, a contributor found Olivia to be the "most memorable when she's in woman-scorned mode" and likened her to "a thugged-out Aaliyah and pissed-off Mýa". In his review of the album, Henderson praised Olivia as having an "impressive combination of beauty and bravado", writing that she "makes recording a debut album seem easy". Ehrlich praised Olivia's vocals, describing them as "soulful, throaty purrs and staccato rhymes".

Azpiri praised the album, saying "her softer tracks show some versatility", but felt Olivia's best work came "when she is venting her spleen rather than revealing her soul". Entertainment Weekly's Mark Bautz praised the album's production and mix of R&B and hip hop but criticized it as "lack[ing] the overall energy and excitement of its best songs". He dismissed some songs as "veer[ing] from Deborah Cox-lite to R-rated Lil' Kim". Righi wrote that Olivia and Aaliyah were examples of how "the right attitude, hip-hop production and clothing -- not to mention a body to die for" were considered more important than "the plaintive human voice in the throes of transcendent ecstasy or bottomless hurt" in contemporary R&B. She panned Olivia as lacking substance, and wrote: "But without being able to see the hand gesturing that is an integral part of modern R&B, Olivia's music loses a lot."

== Aftermath ==
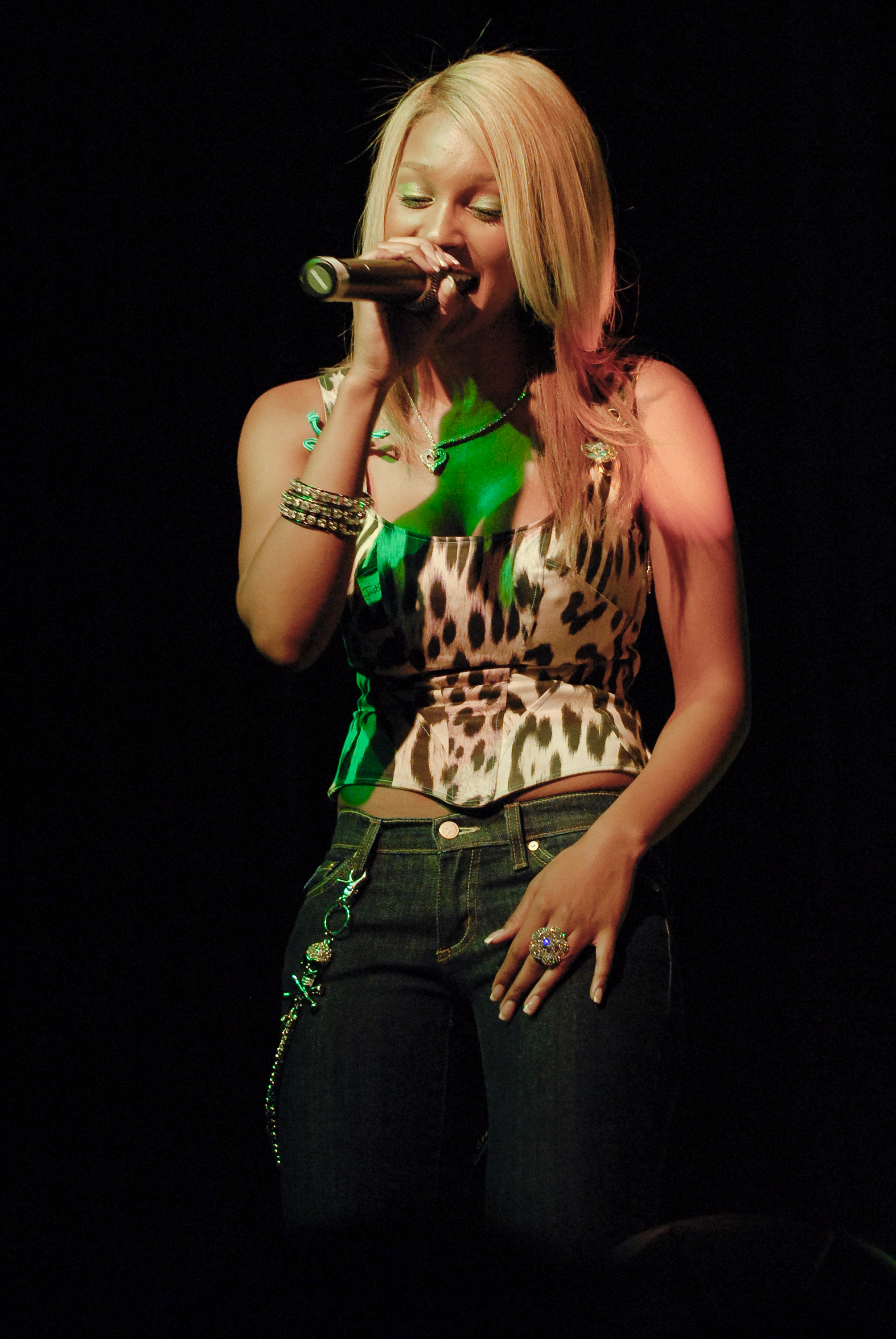
Olivia (pictured in 2007) felt J executives, particularly Clive Davis, were too controlling over her career.

Following the release of her album, Olivia was removed from J; she attributed this decision to "the politics of the industry" and "not actually taking [her] career into [her] own hands". Olivia viewed the recording process for the album as a learning experience for future music ventures. She said record executives took away her control over the creation of the album given her youth and inexperience. Despite saying she had a good working relationship with Davis in promotional interviews, she later described him as "extremely controlling".

Olivia claimed she was forced to be the bad girl while label mate Alicia Keys was promoted as the good girl. Looking back on the album, she regretted not building a more cohesive set of songs and felt there was a lack of a clear direction. She had disagreed with releasing "Bizounce" as the lead single, saying she was uncertain how it would introduce her to audiences. In an official statement, J Records' representatives pointed to Olivia's credits as a co-writer for a majority of the album as proof of her involvement with the project and maintained: "Clive doesn't categorize artists as good or bad girls".

After being dropped by J, Olivia met with Interscope Geffen A&M Records chairman Jimmy Iovine and obtained a record deal with G-Unit. The label's founder 50 Cent said he enjoyed Olivia's previous work and blamed J Records for sabotaging her career. While working with the label, Olivia became known as "the First Lady of G-Unit" and was featured on "Candy Shop", "So Amazing", and "Best Friend". Despite the songs' successes, she left G-Unit due to internal conflicts. She wanted to be taken seriously as a solo artist instead of being seen as "the person that kept doing the hooks". In a 2010 interview with HipHopDX, she said that 50 Cent marketed her as a rapper instead of an R&B singer. After leaving G-Unit, Olivia continued to release music, and in 2011, she starred in the reality television show Love & Hip Hop: New York.

== Track listing ==
Olivia track listing
No.	Title	Writer(s)	Producer(s)	Length
1.	"Bizounce"	Douglas Allen; David "Pic" Conley; Olivia Longott; Quincy Patrick; Juan "Magic" Peters; Joshua P. Thompson	Allen; Thompson	4:24
2.	"Are U Capable"	Conley; Longott; Patrick; Peters; Thompson; Bingo	Thompson; Peters^{[a]}	3:08
3.	"You Got the Damn Thing"	Harvey Mason Jr.; Tamara Powell; Trina Powell; Steven Russell; Damon Thomas; Flinstone	The Underdogs	3:52
4.	"Silly Bitch in Love"	Longott; Patrick; Warren Robinson; Warren Wilson	Wilson	3:34
5.	"It's On Again"	Kizzy Amos; Rob Fusari; Thompson	Fusari; Thompson	4:35
6.	"Woop-T-Woo"	Khadejia Bass; Michael Jackson; Lamar Mitchell; Rufus "Blaq" Moore	Moore; Prince Charles Alexander	4:31
7.	"Whoadie" (featuring Petey Pablo)	Longott; Moore; Francisco Palacios; Ross Sloan	Spydaman; Fran Lover	4:07
8.	"'Til He Comes Home"	Conley; Longott; Wilson; Bingo; Devi; Corté	Conley; Wilson^{[a]}	4:55
9.	"Bring Da Roof Down"	Conley; Longott; Peters; Thompson	Thompson; Peters^{[a]}	2:58
10.	"When 2 Souls Touch"	Fusari; Patrick; Thompson	Fusari; Thompson	4:39
11.	"Lower 2 My Heart"	Danny Mercado; Patrick; Peters; Thompson	Thompson	4:13
12.	"Look Around" (duet with Jimmy Cozier)	Teron Beal; Cozier; Cheri Dennis	Fanatic	5:14
Total length:				49:10

Japanese bonus track
No.	Title	Writer(s)	Producer(s)	Length
13.	"Under New Conditions"	Longott; Mercado; Patrick; Peters; Thompson	Thompson; Peters^{[a]}	3:05
Total length:				52:15

Notes

- ^{^[a]} denotes a co-producer

== Personnel ==
Credits adapted from the liner notes of Olivia, J, BMG Rights Management:

Performance credits

- Tavia Ivey – vocals (background)
- Olivia Longott – primary artist
- Tamara Powell – vocals (background)

Visuals and imagery

- Eric Altenburger – retouching
- June Ambrose – stylist
- Marc Baptiste – photography
- Sheryl Lutz-Brown – design
- Ralph Robinson – assistant

Instruments

- Eddie Allen – horn
- Baby Paul – drum programming
- Everett Collins – keyboards
- Angel Papo Vasquez – horn
- Bruce Williams – horn
- Warren Wilson – bass, composer, producer, vocal producer

Technical and production

- Charles "Prince Charles" Alexander – engineer, mixing, producer
- Louis Alfred III – engineer
- Doug Allen – composer, guitar, keyboards
- Scott Andrews – arranger, engineer, programming
- Rufus Blaq – producer, vocals (background)
- Earl Cohen – engineer, mixing
- Tom Coyne – mastering
- Jimmy Cozier – composer, guest artist, vocal arrangement
- Cheri Dennis – composer
- Rob Fusari – composer, producer
- Pete Karam – engineer
- Khadejia Bass – composer
- Manny Marroquin – mixing
- Tony Maserati – mixing
- Harvey Mason Jr. – composer, producer
- Victor McCoy – assistant
- Bart Migal – assistant
- Lamar Mitchell – composer
- Francisco G. Palacios – composer
- Trina Powell – composer, vocals (background)
- Warren Robinson – composer
- John Roper – digital transfers
- Steve Russell – composer
- Damon Thomas – composer, producer
- Joshua Thompson – composer
- Elai Tubo – engineer, mixing

== Charts ==
Chart performance for Olivia
Chart (2001)	Peak position
US Billboard 200	55
US Top R&B/Hip-Hop Albums (Billboard)	22
