= List of number-one hits of 2005 (Austria) =

Australian singles chart

This is a list of the Austrian Singles Chart number-one hits of 2005.

Issue date	Song	Artist
2 January	"Sweetest Poison"	Nu Pagadi
9 January	"Sweetest Poison"	Nu Pagadi
16 January	"Sweetest Poison"	Nu Pagadi
23 January	"Schnappi, das kleine Krokodil"	Schnappi
30 January	"Schnappi, das kleine Krokodil"	Schnappi
6 February	"Schnappi, das kleine Krokodil"	Schnappi
13 February	"Schnappi, das kleine Krokodil"	Schnappi
20 February	"Schnappi, das kleine Krokodil"	Schnappi
27 February	"Schnappi, das kleine Krokodil"	Schnappi
6 March	"Schnappi, das kleine Krokodil"	Schnappi
13 March	"Schnappi, das kleine Krokodil"	Schnappi
20 March	"Schnappi, das kleine Krokodil"	Schnappi
27 March	"Schnappi, das kleine Krokodil"	Schnappi
3 April	"Schnappi, das kleine Krokodil"	Schnappi
10 April	"Emanuela"	Fettes Brot
17 April	"Emanuela"	Fettes Brot
24 April	"Emanuela"	Fettes Brot
1 May	"Emanuela"	Fettes Brot
8 May	"Candy Shop"	50 Cent featuring Olivia
15 May	"Cowboy"	Ch!pz
22 May	"Cowboy"	Ch!pz
29 May	"Cowboy"	Ch!pz
5 June	"Lonely"	Akon
12 June	"Lonely"	Akon
19 June	"Lonely"	Akon
26 June	"Lonely"	Akon
3 July	"Lonely"	Akon
10 July	"Lonely"	Akon
17 July	"Lonely"	Akon
24 July	"Lonely"	Akon
31 July	"Lonely"	Akon
7 August	"Rising Girl"	Rising Girl
14 August	"Rising Girl"	Rising Girl
21 August	"Rising Girl"	Rising Girl
28 August	"La Camisa Negra"	Juanes
4 September	"Durch den Monsun"	Tokio Hotel
11 September	"Durch den Monsun"	Tokio Hotel
18 September	"Durch den Monsun"	Tokio Hotel
25 September	"Durch den Monsun"	Tokio Hotel
2 October	"Durch den Monsun"	Tokio Hotel
9 October	"Durch den Monsun"	Tokio Hotel
16 October	"Push the Button"	Sugababes
23 October	"Push the Button"	Sugababes
30 October	"Push the Button"	Sugababes
6 November	"Push the Button"	Sugababes
13 November	"Push the Button"	Sugababes
20 November	"Hung Up"	Madonna
27 November	"Hung Up"	Madonna
4 December	"Hung Up"	Madonna
11 December	"Hung Up"	Madonna
18 December	"Hung Up"	Madonna
25 December	"Hung Up"	Madonna

== See also ==
- 2005 in music
