= So Sexy (Olivia song) =

Single by Olivia
- Released: August 2, 2005
- Length: 3:56
- Label: G-Unit; Interscope
- Songwriter(s): Patrick "J. Que" Smith; Keri Hilson; Tab Nkhereanye; Walter Milsap III

Olivia singles chronology
"Twist It" (2005)	"So Sexy" (2005)	"Wild 2nite" (2005)

"So Sexy" is a song by American R&B singer Olivia. It was written by Patrick "J. Que" Smith, Tab Nkhereanye, and Walter Milsap III for her unreleased second studio album, her G-Unit debut Behind Closed Doors. The song was released as the album's second single and peaked at number 60 on the US Billboard Hot 100 and number 30 on the Hot R&B/Hip-Hop Songs chart.

== Music video ==
A music video for "So Sexy" was directed by Marcus Raboy.

== Track listing ==
Digital single

- "So Sexy" – 3:56

== Charts ==
Weekly chart performance for "So Sexy"
Chart (2005)	Peak position
US Billboard Hot 100	60
US Hot R&B/Hip-Hop Songs (Billboard)	30

== Release history ==
Region	Date	Format(s)	Label(s)	Ref.
United States	September 13, 2005	Rhythmic contemporary radio	G-Unit, Interscope	
