= Bizounce =

2001 single by Olivia

Single by Olivia

from the album Olivia
- B-side: "Are U Capable"; "It's On Again"
- Released: January 30, 2001
- Studio: Tallest Tree (West Orange, New Jersey); Right Track (New York City)
- Genre: R&B
- Length: 3:28
- Label: J
- Songwriters: Quincy Patrick; David Conley; Doug Allen; Juan Peters; Joshua Thompson; Olivia Longott
- Producers: Quincy Patrick; Joshua Thompson; Doug Allen

Olivia singles chronology
"Bizounce" (2001)	"Are U Capable" (2001)

"Bizounce" is a song by American singer Olivia from her self-titled debut studio album (2001). Producers Quincy Patrick and Joshua Thompson wrote the song in collaboration with Olivia and songwriters David Conley, Doug Allen, and Juan "Magic" Peters. It was released on January 30, 2001, as the lead single from the album and as Olivia's debut single. It is an upbeat R&B track with lyrics that revolve around dissatisfaction with a relationship and the desire to "bizounce" or leave the partner. In her autobiography, Release Me: My Life, My Words, Olivia revealed her disappointment that "Bizounce" was chosen and released as the lead single because of interference by label executives.

"Bizounce" received primarily mixed reviews from music critics; some critics praised Olivia's vocals, image, and its choice as her debut single while others questioned Olivia's connection with the music. The single was a commercial success in the United States, peaking at number fifteen on the US Billboard Hot 100 and number four on the US Hot R&B/Hip-Hop Singles & Tracks charts. It also peaked at number sixteen on the Canadian Singles Chart. "Bizounce" is Olivia's most successful solo single, leaving her 2005 collaboration with rapper 50 Cent on "Candy Shop" as her most successful overall. To promote "Bizounce", she performed it on various television and live shows. She also included the song as a part of the promotional tour leading up the album's release. The song's accompanying music video was directed by Marcus Raboy.

== Background ==
Olivia initially rapped under the name "O-Lovely", before abandoning it to attend Hofstra University and Five Towns College as a different way to advance her career in music. Olivia recalled that people frequently compared her voice to Brandy. Olivia was signed to J Records at age 17, becoming the first artist to join the record label. For her audition, she performed the gospel hymn "His Eye Is on the Sparrow" for American record producer Clive Davis. During an interview with Billboard, Olivia revealed that she was immediately signed to the label following the meeting. She described herself as "the one chosen to flagship the label" since her single and album were one of the first projects released by the company. Executives from the record company referred to her as "the First Lady of J".

Joshua Thompson, who previously arranged for Olivia's audition for Arista Records' executives and Davis, produced her demo. "Bizounce" was produced by Thompson and Doug Allen, who also contributed to the writing along with Olivia, David Conley, Quincy Patrick, and Juan "Magic" Peters. J Records senior vice president Ron Gillyard described Olivia as "the real deal", emphasizing her roles as "a songwriter, a singer, and a rapper". Olivia later described the recording and promotion of "Bizounce" and the album as a learning experience for her future ventures; she said her time at J Records was: "cut short by the politics of the industry and me not actually taking my career into my own hands". She said record executives took away her control over the creation of the album because of her youth and inexperience.

== Composition and lyrics ==
Olivia – "Bizounce"
"Bizounce" is a R&B and funk song that features drums, keyboards, and a bass guitar. A Billboard reviewer described Olivia's vocals as reflective of her hip hop influences.

According to digital information from Beatport, "Bizounce" is a R&B and funk song composed in the key of G minor. The song's instrumentation is composed of drums, keyboards, and a bass guitar. AllMusic's Jon Azpiri praised the contrast between the "brutally frank" lyrics about break-ups and infidelity, and the "seductive" instrumentals, making the single one of the most memorable of 2001. According to a review in Billboard, Olivia's vocal performance reflects her hip hop influences and gives the single a "street edge" while its "orchestral tinges" are best-suited for R&B radio.

In an interview with Billboard, Olivia called the single an "empowering women's song" for inspiring women to leave unfulfilling relationships. She said she wrote it: "for all the people who don't know how to tell the other person to 'bounce' ". An article in Vibe magazine noted lyrics, like: "I can't take this shit no more / Picture frame broken daddy 'cause I can't trust you / I'm ridin' high now / So nigga fuck you", as creating an impression of Olivia as a "potty-mouth". NME's John Mulvey commented that Olivia's "ruthlessness rather than her vocabulary" was the standout, especially in the lyric: "Shoulda known what you missed at home / Now you're all alone with no-one to bone". Mulvey joked that the amount of censorship on the radio edit made Olivia sound "avant-garde".

== Release and promotion ==
"Bizounce" was released through J Records as the lead single from Olivia's debut album Olivia on January 30, 2001. The CD release, released on March 20, 2001, included explicit and "PG-13" versions of the single along with a twenty-nine second snippet of the second single "Are U Capable", and a minute and twenty-two second snippet of the album track "It's On Again". The instrumental and "X-rated" versions of the single were released on vinyl.

Olivia made appearances on television and on live shows to promote "Bizounce". Before the album's release, she performed the single on Soul Train, BET, MTV's hip-hop video block Sucker Free (known at the time as DFX), and The Source Sound Lab. It was included on the set list for her promotional tour leading up to the album's release on May 15, 2001. Director Marcus Raboy shot the accompanying music video for the single. A review from Billboard praised the video as something that would: "catch the eyes and ears of music fans". Raboy would later work with Olivia on the music video for the follow-up single "Are U Capable".

During the record's promotion, Olivia described having a good working relationship with Davis, but she called him "extremely controlling" after leaving the label. Olivia claimed that she was forced to be the bad girl while label mate Alicia Keys was promoted as the good girl. In an official statement, J Records' representatives pointed to Olivia's credits as a co-writer for a majority of the album as proof of her involvement with the project and maintained: "Clive doesn't categorize artists as good or bad girls". In her 2014 autobiography, Release Me: My Life, My Words, Olivia wrote that she disagreed with the record label's decision to release "Bizounce" as her debut single. Despite saying the single was a perfect fit for the clubs, and one of her favorite tracks from the album, she believed it did not reflect her as an artist. She originally pushed for "It's On Again" to be the single.

== Critical response ==
"Bizounce" received mixed reviews from music critics. Mark Bautz of Entertainment Weekly described "Bizounce" as "a saucy hit single" and noted it as one of the album's highlights. A review in Billboard praised Olivia's vocals, saying she "has the mouth of a bad girl and the voice of an angel", and described the single as making her: "a bona fide R&B singer". SongQuarters' Paulina Bozek wrote that "Bizounce" established Olivia as a "powerful R&B/rap debutante". Shaheem Reid of MTV named the single an "anthem for women who are fed up wit their mates" while an article in Vibe magazine opined that it was a "hit heavy on attitude". Mulvey of NME commended the single as giving a "steely boot to a crap lover" in the style of TLC, Kelis, and Eve as well as being a "vicious kiss-off" and a "boudoir come-on".

The Morning Call's Len Righi criticized "Bizounce" for being indicative of a negative trend in R&B music, where "the plaintive human voice in the throes of transcendent ecstasy or bottomless hurt is not nearly as important as the right attitude, hip-hop production and clothing". Righi negatively compared the single to music by R&B singer Aaliyah, saying they both emphasized style over substance.

== Commercial performance ==
"Bizounce" was a commercial success in the United States. It peaked at number 15 on the US Billboard Hot 100 chart and number four on the Billboard Hot R&B/Hip-Hop Singles & Tracks chart. Sales made up the vast majority of its performance, almost topping the component sales for chart but scraping the bottom the top-75 airplay chart. The single was Olivia's highest charting entry on the Hot 100 chart until her 2005 collaboration with rapper 50 Cent on "Candy Shop" became her only number-one single on the chart. Prior to the release and success of "Candy Shop", Fred Bronson of Billboard viewed Olivia as a one-hit wonder with "Bizounce" as her only previous success. In Canada, the single peaked at number 16 on the sales-only Canadian Singles Chart. As of August 13, 2003, "Bizounce" has sold 415,000 copies.

== Track listings ==
- 12-inch single
1. "Bizounce" (X-Rated) – 3:28
2. "Bizounce" (Instrumental) – 3:28
- Cassette single
1. "Bizounce" (Explicit Version) – 3:28
2. "Bizounce" (PG-13 Version) – 3:28
3. "Are U Capable" (Snippet) – 0:29
4. "It's On Again" (Snippet) – 1:22
- CD single
1. "Bizounce" (Explicit Version) – 3:28
2. "Bizounce" (PG-13 Version) – 3:28
3. "Are U Capable" (Snippet) – 0:29
4. "It's On Again" (Snippet) – 1:22

== Credits and personnel ==
Credits are adapted from the liner notes of Olivia.

Recording locations

- Music recording –Tallest Tree Studios (West Orange, New Jersey); Right Track Studios (New York City)
- Mixing – Tallest Tree Studios (West Orange, New Jersey)

Personnel

- Songwriting – Douglas A Allen, David L Conley, Olivia Longott, Quincy Q Patrick, Juan "Magic" Peters, Joshua P. Thompson
- Production – Joshua P. Thompson, Juan "Magic" Peters
- Vocal production and recording – Olivia, Quincy Patrick, Joshua P. Thompson
- Instruments – Juan "Magic Peters, Doug Allen
- Mixing – Earl Cohen
- Background vocals – Olivia Longott and Quincy Patrick

== Charts ==
=== Weekly charts ===
Chart (2001)	Peak position
Canada (Nielsen SoundScan)	16
US Billboard Hot 100	15
US Hot R&B/Hip-Hop Singles & Tracks (Billboard)	4
US Rhythmic Top 40 (Billboard)	12

=== Year-end charts ===
Chart (2001)	Position
Canada (Nielsen SoundScan)	133
US Hot R&B/Hip-Hop Singles & Tracks (Billboard)	63
US Rhythmic Top 40 (Billboard)	56

== Release history ==
Region	Date	Format(s)	Label(s)	Ref.
United States	January 30, 2001	Rhythmic contemporary; urban contemporary radio	J	
United States	March 20, 2001	CD single	J	

== Bibliography ==
- Longott, Olivia. Release Me: My Life, My Words. Urban Books: 2014. ISBN 978-1-60162-416-1
