= Are U Capable =

Single by Olivia

from the album Olivia
- Released: June 12, 2001
- Studio: Tallest Tree Studios (West Orange, New Jersey)
- Genre: R&B, hip-hop
- Length: 3:08
- Label: J
- Songwriters: Olivia Longott; Bingo; David Conley; Joshua Thompson; Juan Peters; Quincy Patrick
- Producers: Joshua Thompson; Quincy Patrick; Juan Peters

Olivia singles chronology
"Bizounce" (2001)	"Are U Capable" (2001)	"Candy Shop" (2005)

"Are U Capable" is a song recorded by American singer Olivia on her self-titled debut studio album (2001). It was written by Olivia along with Bingo, David Conley, Quincy Patrick, Joshua Thompson, Quincy Patrick and Juan Peters, with production handled by the latter. The song was released as the album's second single, following the lead single, "Bizounce". The lyrics of the song speak of a woman questioning whether or not a partner could sexually satisfy her.

The song received generally positive reviews from contemporary music critics, who felt that the song was going to achieve similar success as its predecessor. The song was a commercial disappointment, it failed to chart on Billboard's Hot R&B/Hip-Hop Songs chart; peaking below the chart at number 24 on the Bubbling Under R&B/Hip-Hop Songs chart only. A music video (directed by Marcus Raboy) was released to promote the single.

== Recording and release ==
"Are U Capable" was written by Olivia Longott, Bingo, David Conley, Joshua Thompson, Juan Peters and Quincy Patrick. The production was handled by Joshua Thompson with Juan Peters serving as the co-producer. It was recorded at the Tallest Tree Studios in West Orange, New Jersey. The track was mixed and recorded by Earl Cohen. The song was sent to US rhythmic contemporary radio stations on June 12, 2001 as the second single from Olivia's self-titled debut studio album. The song was made available as a 12-inch single through J. It was also included on a CD with the album's lead single "Bizounce" and album track "It's On Again".

"Are U Capable" was included on the compilation albums BMG Pop Promo (2001), and Harlem in the Mix (2003). The accompanying music video was directed by Marcus Raboy and premiered via MTV on July 2, 2001. The video depicted Olivia in three different sets—a sewerage (while accompanied by backup dancers), a steam room and a bedroom. It was featured on the list of the most-played clips on BET.

== Composition and reception ==
"Are U Capable" is an R&B and hip hop song that is composed in the key of B♭major, set in common time signature, and has a tempo of 94 beats per minute. The song's instrumentation is composed of drums and a bass guitar. It has a total playing time of three minutes and eight seconds (3:08). The old-school hip hop-inspired song was described as "hot" and "radio-friendly". Olivia raps and sings about whether or not a partner could sexually satisfy her. The lyrics include: "Can you kiss below the border while I run the camcorder". Richard B. Henderson of Billboard viewed Olivia rapping alongside singing on the song as a "double-duty". Len Righi of The Morning Call interpreted that Olivia "blatantly questions her lover's stamina" in the song.

Rashaun Hall of Billboard described "Are U Capable" as a "saucy-follow up" to her previous single and felt it "may be the song that sets her career ablaze". B-Traxx from Hits praised the song, elucidating it as "an R&B joint that no one can afford to pass on" and predicting that it was going to be "a summer smash". A reviewer from Contactmusic.com lauded the song, calling it a "vibrant sensation" while complimenting its lyrics and production. Mark Bautz of Entertainment Weekly described its lyrics as "fresh sex talk" and noted it as one of the album's highlights. Following its release as a radio single, "Are U Capable" peaked at number 24 on the Bubbling Under R&B/Hip-Hop Songs chart in July 2001.

== Track listings ==
CD single
No.	Title	Length
1.	"Are U Capable" (radio edit)	3:08
2.	"Are U Capable" (instrumental)	3:08
3.	"Are U Capable" (call out hook)	0:10

12-inch single
No.	Title	Length
1.	"Are U Capable" (radio edit)	3:08
2.	"Are U Capable" (instrumental)	3:08
3.	"Are U Capable" (club mix)	3:05
4.	"Are U Capable" (acapella)	3:08

== Credits and personnel ==
Credits adapted from the back cover of "Are U Capable".

Recording

- Recorded at Tallest Tree Studios (West Orange, New Jersey)
- Mixed at Tallest Tree Studios

Personnel

- Olivia Longott – vocals, songwriting
- Bingo – songwriting
- David Conley – songwriting
- Joshua Thompson – songwriting, production
- Juan Peters – songwriting, co-production, drums, bass, keyboards
- Doug Allen – guitar
- Quincy Patrick – production, background vocals, songwriting
- Earl Cohen – recording, mixing

== Charts ==
Chart (2001)	Peak position
US Bubbling Under R&B/Hip-Hop Songs (Billboard)	24
