= Twist It (disambiguation) =

"Twist It" is a 2005 song by Olivia featuring Lloyd Banks. "Twist It" may also refer to:

- "Twist It", song by Eve's Plum
- "Twist It", song by The John Barry Seven written by John Barry 1961
- "Twist it", a command in Hasbro's Bop It game

== See also ==
- "Twist It Up", No. 25 single 1963 Twist (dance) by Chubby Checker
