= With Love (Charles Tolliver album) =

Studio album by Charles Tolliver Big Band
- Released: 2006
- Recorded: June 2 and 3, 2006
- Studio: Bennett Studios, Englewood, New Jersey
- Genre: Jazz
- Length: 59:09
- Label: Blue Note; 0946 3 69315 2 4
- Producer: Charles Tolliver, Michael Cuscuna

Charles Tolliver chronology
Live in Berlin at the Quasimodo (1988)	With Love (2006)	Emperor March: Live at the Blue Note (2009)

With Love is an album by the Charles Tolliver Big Band, led by trumpeter and composer Charles Tolliver. Arriving after a hiatus of nearly 20 years, it was recorded on June 2 and 3, 2006, at Bennett Studios in Englewood, New Jersey, and was issued later that year by Blue Note Records, Tolliver's first release as a leader for the label.

== Reception ==
Professional ratings
Review scores
Source	Rating
All About Jazz	4.5/5 stars
All About Jazz	3.5/5 stars
All About Jazz	4/5 stars
All About Jazz	4.5/5 stars
All About Jazz	3/5 stars
AllMusic	3.5/5 stars
The Guardian	4/5 stars
PopMatters	6/10 stars
Tom Hull – on the Web	B

With Love was nominated for Best Large Jazz Ensemble Album at the 50th Annual Grammy Awards.

Ben Ratliff of The New York Times wrote: "There's something strangely manifestolike about this album. It isn't preservationist or pedantic. It isn't protecting anything; it's having too much fun for that. But it demonstrates what we may be missing if we completely abandon the viscerally exciting qualities in jazz big bands that were important not so long ago."

Writing for The Village Voice, Francis Davis stated: "As was true of the '70s band, this one's signature sound is that of a small group regularly breaking free from a much larger one—a hard-bop big band without contradiction, in other words, with individual soloists wailing over the rhythm section after the opening theme... All told, I like With Love better than anything else I've heard since compiling my 2006 Top 10... this is a band you owe it to yourself to hear live."

A writer for Billboard called the album "an emphatic statement from an artist who clearly has a special gift for big-band composition."

Entertainment Weekly's Larry Blumenfeld noted that Tolliver's "current big band lacks the audacity of his 1970s unit but matches its punch and poise," and commented: "Solos shine... Brighter still are the arrangements."

In a review for The Guardian, John Fordham stated that Tolliver "surfaces with an absolutely blistering big band playing his own enthralling arrangements... It's like a cross between Gil Evans, Don Ellis and a brash west coast studio band, with free-jazz thrown in. And though Tolliver's soloing is unsteady at times, as a modern big-band album this is a real cracker."

Will Layman of PopMatters remarked: "The band is blustery and rough — with the kind of sophisticated but high-octane sound that Thad Jones and Mel Lewis once owned... The individual voices of the players are often exciting... It's certain that his big band could rip the roof off a club or even concert hall in concert. The charts are fast and blaring, with sax lines like serpents and a great drummer to launch the trumpets sky-high."

AllMusic's Michael G. Nastos wrote: "The music is exciting, joyous, exuberant, and upbeat, but also displays a dense, sometimes messy persona, and has intonation issues... But the high points are way up in the stratosphere."

Commenting for All About Jazz, Troy Collins stated: "Tolliver demonstrates the raw power and primal force a large ensemble can muster... [his] group delivers some of the most impassioned playing in recent memory. Unveiling a series of sophisticated charts that brim with knotty counterpoint and dynamic arrangements, the session is fueled with an irrepressible momentum." AAJ's Jim Santella noted that Tolliver "encourages the band through example," and remarked: "Tolliver sacrifices technique for spirit. He's convincing with his deeply felt lyricism and waterfall cascades of legato 16th notes... the trumpeter sings out instrumentally from the bottom of his heart." AAJ writer J Hunter wrote: "I'm not a fan of big band music in general, but With Love had me locked in from the start. If this style is to your liking, this disc will knock you out of the park." Critic Joel Roberts commented: "Tolliver is back with a vengeance... [he] has assembled a truly all-star big band lineup... Here's hoping we hear more often from this underrated jazz titan and his impressive big band.

== Track listing ==
"'Round Midnight" composed by Thelonious Monk. Remaining tracks composed by Charles Tolliver.

1. "Rejoicin'" – 6:20
2. "With Love" – 9:26
3. "'Round Midnight" – 9:10
4. "Mournin' Variations" – 10:57
5. "Right Now" – 6:30
6. "Suspicion" – 8:37
7. "Hit the Spot" – 8:09

== Personnel ==
- Charles Tolliver – trumpet
- Todd Bashore – alto saxophone, clarinet
- Jimmy Cozier – alto saxophone (track 5)
- Craig Handy – alto saxophone, soprano saxophone, clarinet, flute
- Billy Harper – tenor saxophone
- Bill Saxton – tenor saxophone, clarinet
- Howard Johnson – baritone saxophone, bass clarinet
- David Guy – lead trumpet
- Chris Albert – trumpet
- Keyon Harrold – trumpet (tracks 1, 3, 7)
- David Weiss – trumpet
- James Zollar – trumpet (tracks 2, 4–6)
- Joe Fiedler – trombone (track 3)
- Clark Gayton – trombone
- Stafford Hunter – trombone
- Jason Jackson – trombone
- Aaron Johnson – bass trombone, tuba
- Stanley Cowell – piano (tracks 2–4)
- Robert Glasper – piano (tracks 1, 5–7)
- Ched Tolliver – guitar (track 6)
- Cecil McBee – acoustic bass
- Victor Lewis – drums
