= Jimmy Cozier =

American R&B singer and songwriter

- Born: February 6, 1977 (age 49)
- Origin: Brooklyn, New York, U.S.
- Genres: R&B, reggae, hip-hop
- Years active: 2001–present
- Labels: J; Cozi Music
- Father: Jimmy Cozier Sr.

Jimmy Cozier (born February 6, 1977) is an American R&B singer and songwriter. He is best known for his 2001 single "She's All I Got", and for being one of the inaugural artists signed to Clive Davis' J Records label.

== Biography ==
The son of Guyanese American jazz saxophonist Jimmy Cozier, and Dawn Cozier, a Jamaican born hair stylist. Cozier and his younger brother Malik were raised in Crown Heights, Brooklyn. Cozier was encouraged to sing as a child by his family, who would demand that he perform in group settings. He started out as a singer/songwriter for artists such as Mýa, Sinéad O'Connor, and Janet Jackson (whose hit "Girlfriend/Boyfriend" he co-wrote). He was a background vocalist for the Junior Mafia/Lil' Kim track "Backstabbers" and toured with Joe behind the latter's album All That I Am.

Wyclef Jean caught word of Cozier's talent through Cozier manager Jacques “Haitian Jack” Agnant and had him meet with Clive Davis, who signed Cozier to J Records in 2000. His debut single "She's All I Got" was released in 2001, and rose to #26 on the Billboard Hot 100 and to #4 on the R&B chart.

Following the success of the single, his self-titled debut album was released on July 9, 2001, and hit the Billboard Top 200 at #65 and #15 on the R&B Albums chart. A follow-up single "So Much to Lose" was released later in the year, and peaked at #123 on the R&B chart. He also appeared on labelmate Alicia Keys' debut Songs in A Minor on the track "Mr. Man" which he co-wrote, and "Look Around" with other labelmate Olivia, on her self-titled debut album.

He began writing songs for other artists such as Chris Brown, Olivia and Cheri Dennis in the years since. After the folding of J Records, he became an independent artist, creating his own label, Cozi Music Inc.

In 2007, he announced work on a new album, releasing two singles, "U Got Them Goods" and "You", that year. Continued work on his sophomore album stretched through 2010.

His second album, Way of Life was announced in 2010, led by the single "Tonight" which was released on March 2, 2010. The album was released on March 16, 2010.

In 2013, he collaborated with Sean Paul for his single "Always Be My Lady" which was released on August 2. Additionally, he released a single "Girls Girls" that year.

The next year, he premiered a new single "Choose Me" featuring Shaggy and announced his third album would be titled R&B (Reggae & Blues) set for a 2015 release. Following the single, he collaborated with artists such as Gyptian, Elephant Man, Shaggy, Red Fox, Melissa Musique on various compilation albums. One of those collaborations, "Special Girl (Remix)" was released as a single in 2014.

His third album, titled Get Cozi was released on December 9, 2016. The set's second single "I'll Change" was announced that same month.

In 2024, he collaborated with RNC chair Lara Trump on the song, "Anything is Possible." He is credited as a co-lyricist with Trump on the song.

== Discography ==
=== Albums ===
- Jimmy Cozier (2001)
- Way of Life (2010)
- Get Cozi (2016)

=== Singles ===
- 2001: "She's All I Got"
- 2001: "So Much To Lose"
- 2007: "U Got Them Goods"
- 2007: "You"
- 2010: "Tonight"
- 2013: "Always Be My Lady" (with Sean Paul)
- 2013: "Girls Girls"
- 2014: "Special Girl (Remix)" (with Supa Hype, Gyptian)
- 2014: "Choose Me" (featuring Shaggy)
- 2016: "I'll Change"
- 2018: "Love Her"

=== Featured singles ===
- 2018: "Hot Like You (Fire)" (Freddy Browne feat. Jimmy Cozier & Crystal Kay)
- 2001: "Mr Man" (Alicia Keys feat. Jimmy Cozier)
