= Shorty Wanna Ride =

Single by Young Buck

from the album Straight Outta Cashville
- B-side: "Stomp"
- Released: August 26, 2004
- Studio: Circle House Studios, Teamwork Studios
- Genre: Crunk
- Length: 4:21 (Album Version); 4:12 (Radio Edit)
- Label: G-Unit; Interscope
- Songwriters: David Brown, LaMarquis Jefferson, Craig Love, Lil Jon
- Producer: Lil' Jon

Young Buck singles chronology
| "Let Me In" (2004) | "Shorty Wanna Ride" (2004) | "Stomp" (2004) |

"Shorty Wanna Ride" is the second single from Young Buck's first album, Straight Outta Cashville.

== Background ==
"Shorty Wanna Ride" was released in late 2004. The song debuted at number 68 on the Billboard Hot 100 and peaked at number 17 on the chart, becoming Young Buck's highest charting single. The song was produced by Jonathan "Lil Jon" Smith.

== Music video ==
The video was inspired by the film Natural Born Killers. Actress Malinda Williams stars in this video as Young Buck's love interest. Pauly Shore also makes a cameo appearance in this video as a news reporter. At the end of the video, the song "Stomp" is briefly played. The Game (who has verse in the song) makes a cameo appearance in the video. G-Unit leader 50 Cent and Olivia also have cameo appearances in the video.

== Charts ==
=== Weekly charts ===
| Chart (2004) | Peak position |
|---|---|
| US Billboard Hot 100 | 17 |
| US Hot R&B/Hip-Hop Songs (Billboard) | 8 |
| US Hot Rap Songs (Billboard) | 6 |
| US Rhythmic Airplay (Billboard) | 18 |

=== Year-end charts ===
| Chart (2004) | Position |
|---|---|
| US Hot R&B/Hip-Hop Songs (Billboard) | 99 |
| Chart (2005) | Position |
| US Hot R&B/Hip-Hop Songs (Billboard) | 89 |

== Release history ==
| Region | Date | Format(s) | Label(s) | Ref. |
|---|---|---|---|---|
| United States | September 14, 2004 | Rhythmic contemporary · urban contemporary radio | G-Unit, Interscope | |
