= Let Me In (Young Buck song) =

Single by Young Buck featuring 50 Cent

from the album Straight Outta Cashville
- Released: July 2, 2004
- Recorded: 2004
- Genre: Gangsta rap; hardcore hip hop; crunk
- Label: G-Unit; Interscope
- Songwriters: David Brown; Curtis Jackson; Khari Cain
- Producer: Needlz

Young Buck singles chronology
"Let Me In" (2004)	"Shorty Wanna Ride" (2004)

50 Cent singles chronology
"On Fire" (2004)	"Let Me In" (2004)	"Westside Story" (2004)

"Let Me In" is the debut single by Young Buck, from his debut album, Straight Outta Cashville. It features 50 Cent and is produced by Needlz. The music video features cameo appearances by Lloyd Banks, Juvenile, Olivia, Stat Quo, David Banner, Slim Thug, Daz Dillinger, C-Note and D-Red from Botany Boyz and Lil Scrappy. B-Real from Cypress Hill freestyled to the song's beat for his song "Let Me Blaze" on his debut mixtape "The Gunslinger".

== Background ==
"Let Me In" peaked at number 34 on the Billboard Hot 100. Fellow G-Unit member, 50 Cent, contributes to the song. The music video on YouTube has received over 9 million views as of April 2026.

== Track listing ==
Digital download

No.	Title	Writer(s)	Producer(s)	Length
1.	"Let Me In" (feat. 50 Cent)	D. Brown, C. Jackson, K. Cain	Needlz	3:45
2.	"Black Gloves"	Brown, C. Navarro, D. S. Matthews, D. Wilson, M. Ribas	Doug Wilson & Sean Cane	3:17

CD single

No.	Title	Writer(s)	Producer(s)	Length
1.	"Let Me In (Clean)" (feat. 50 Cent)	D. Brown, C. Jackson, K. Cain	Needlz	3:48
2.	"Let Me In (Instrumental)" (feat. 50 Cent)	D. Brown, C. Jackson, K. Cain	Needlz	3:48
3.	"Let Me In (Explicit)" (feat. 50 Cent)	D. Brown, C. Jackson, K. Cain	Needlz	3:47

== Charts ==
=== Weekly charts ===
Chart (2004)	Peak position
Australia (ARIA)	70
Australian Urban (ARIA)	16
Germany (GfK)	94
UK Singles (OCC)	62
US Billboard Hot 100	34
US Hot R&B/Hip-Hop Songs (Billboard)	15
US Hot Rap Songs (Billboard)	11

=== Year-end charts ===
Chart (2004)	Peak position
US Hot R&B/Hip-Hop Songs (Billboard)	73

== Release history ==
Region	Date	Format(s)	Label(s)	Ref.
United States	June 28, 2004	Rhythmic contemporary · urban contemporary radio	G-Unit, Interscope	
