= T.I.P. (album) =

Studio album by Young Buck
- Released: October 11, 2005 (Original release); November 8, 2005 (Audio CD)
- Recorded: 1999–2000
- Genre: Hip hop; southern hip-hop; gangsta rap
- Length: 53:02
- Label: Mass Appeal
- Producer: D. Smoov

Young Buck chronology
Straight Outta Cashville (2004)	T.I.P. (2005)	Buck the World (2007)

Professional ratings
Review scores
Source	Rating
RapReviews	(5/10)
Stylus Magazine	B

T.I.P. is the third solo studio album and second independent album by rapper Young Buck. It was released on November 8, 2005, through the independent label, Mass Appeal Entertainment. Guest appearances on the album include D-Tay, Rizin Sun, First Born and Bun B.

The album was recorded before Young Buck signed with G-Unit in 2002, but it was not released until after his 2004 solo debut album, Straight Outta Cashville.

== Reception ==
T.I.P. sold more than 26,000 copies in its first week of release to debut at number 40 on the Billboard 200 albums chart. It also reached number 11 on the Top R&B/Hip-Hop Albums chart.

Stylus Magazine writer Evan McGarvey criticized the album's "meager" production values, and he noted that "Young Buck’s charms are alluring, if a little unrefined." McGarvey praised Young Buck for knowing "even then that two rappers make a song intrinsically different than one voice. That in itself is a lesson most rappers seldom learn as rookies." Steve Juon of RapReviews wrote that opening track "Blood in Blood Out" sounded similar to Young Buck's later work, providing the album with a "fairly promising" start. However, Juon added that "too much of this album is just plain mediocre", and that its release was an obvious attempt "to cash in on Buck's fame."

== Track listing ==
All lyrics by Young Buck, music compositions listed below.

No.	Title	Producer(s)	Length
1.	"Blood In Blood Out" (featuring Rizin Sun)	D. Smoov	3:44
2.	"Thug In The Club" (featuring Bun B & Smoov Jizzel)	D. Smoov	3:59
3.	"Caught In The Wind" (featuring D-Tay & Rizin Sun)	D. Smoov	3:41
4.	"Crime Pays"	D. Smoov	4:37
5.	"Penny Pinchin'" (featuring D-Tay)	D. Smoov	4:27
6.	"All About Money" (featuring D-Tay)	D. Smoov	4:30
7.	"All My Life" (featuring D-Tay)	D. Smoov	3:41
8.	"Get Your Murder On"	D. Smoov	3:21
9.	"Can't Keep Livin'"	D. Smoov, additional production Jordan Suecof	4:10
10.	"Hard Hitters" (featuring D-Tay, First Born & Rizin Sun)	D. Smoov	3:56
11.	"Dickie Fits"	D. Smoov	3:47
12.	"Purse First" (featuring Bun B & First Born)	D. Smoov	5:08
13.	"Thugged Out" (featuring D-Tay)	D. Smoov	4:01

== Credits ==
Mastering

- Eric Conn
- Don Cobb

Mixing

- Eric Schilling

Design

- Blake Franklin

Performers

- Young Buck
- Rizin' Sun
- Smoov Jizzell
- D-Tay
- First Born
- Bun B

== Chart performance ==
Chart (2005)	Peak position
U.S. Billboard 200	40
U.S. Top R&B/Hip-Hop Albums	11
