= Jimmy Cozier (jazz musician) =

- Born: November 1954 (age 71); Brooklyn, New York, United States
- Genres: Jazz, Latin jazz, Afro-Cuban jazz
- Occupations: Musician, author, educator
- Instruments: Saxophone, clarinet, flute
- Years active: 1972–present

Jimmy Cozier Sr. (born 1954) is a jazz musician from New York City.

He plays saxophone, flute, and clarinet. He is the father of R&B singer Jimmy Cozier.

He has performed and toured with Panama Francis, Sam Rivers, Reggie Workman, Mongo Santamaria, and Abdullah Ibrahim. He played lead alto saxophone with the big bands of Cab Calloway, Frank Foster, Charlie Persip, Jaki Byard, and Chico O'Farrill.

== Background ==
Cozier studied saxophone with Bill Barron, George Coleman, and William "Buddy" Pearson and clarinet with Charles Russo of the New York City Opera. He is the author of The Jazz Improviser's Woodshed Volumes 1–3 and is a member of the faculty of the Jazz at Lincoln Center Middle School Jazz Academy.

Cozier also leads ensemble workshops where he teaches jazz improvisation. He is a recipient of the National Endowment for the Arts Fellowship Grant.

== Discography ==
With Chico O'Farrill

- Heart of a Legend Milestone (1999)
- Carambola (Milestone, 2000)

With Mongo Santamaria

- Mambo Mongo (Chesky, 1992)
- Brazilian Sunset (1992)

With others

- Colours, Sam Rivers (Black Saint, 1983)
- No Fear, No Die soundtrack, Abdullah Ibrahim (Tip Toe, 1990)
- Anatomy of Groove, M-Base Collective (DIW/Columbia, 1993)
- All My Tomorrows, Grover Washington Jr. (Columbia, 1994)
- With Love, Charles Tolliver (Blue Note, 2007)
