= Straight Outta Cashville =

Studio album by Young Buck
- Released: August 24, 2004
- Studios: Record One (Los Angeles, CA); Soundstage Studios (Nashville, TN); The Big House (Farmington, CT); Quad Studios (Nashville, TN); Sony Music Studios (New York, NY); Circle House Studios (Miami, FL); Platinum Recordings (Atlanta, GA)
- Genres: Southern hip-hop; gangsta rap; hardcore hip-hop
- Length: 55:09
- Labels: Interscope; G-Unit
- Producers: Chad Beatz; Crown; Diverse; DJ Paul; Doug Wilson; Dre & Vidal; Felony Muzik; Juicy J; Lil Jon; Midi Mafia; Mr. Porter; Needlz; Red Spyda; Sha Money XL; Black Jeruz

Young Buck chronology
Thuggin' Til the End (2000)	Straight Outta Cashville (2004)	T.I.P. (2005)

Alternative cover
- Special edition cover

Singles from Straight Outta Ca$hville
- 1. "Let Me In" Released: July 2, 2004; 2. "Shorty Wanna Ride" Released: August 26, 2004

Straight Outta Cashville is the commercial debut studio album by American rapper Young Buck. It was released on August 24, 2004 by Interscope Records and 50 Cent's G-Unit Records. The album was recorded at several studios across the United States, and features G-Unit members alongside artists like David Banner, Lil' Flip, and Ludacris. The album's title references hip-hop group N.W.A's album Straight Outta Compton (1989) and Young Buck's hometown, Nashville.

The album received generally positive reviews, with critics praising Young Buck's delivery, production, and guest features, calling it "the best G-Unit release to date," though some noted that Buck's personality and lyrical distinctiveness were limited and that the album felt familiar at times. Commercially, it debuted at number three on the US Billboard 200, was certified Platinum in the United States, and achieved moderate international success, topping the Canadian Albums Chart and reaching the top 25 in the UK and Scotland.

The album was supported by two official singles, "Let Me In" and "Shorty Wanna Ride," as well as promotional singles "Stomp" and "Look At Me Now/Bonafide Hustler," with the first single charting internationally and the second becoming Buck's highest-charting song in the US. Promotion for Straight Outta Cashville was limited after November 2004 due to Buck's arrest following a Vibe Awards incident, which delayed further album promotion for several months.

== Background ==
Young Buck began rapping around the age of twelve and soon performed for Brian "Baby" Williams, co-founder of Cash Money. He began his professional career with Cash Money in 1997 but left for Juvenile's UTP in 2000, releasing two albums, Born to Be a Thug (2002) and The Compilation (2002), before departing the label in 2003 to join G-Unit. His first recording with G-Unit was the song "Blood Hound" for 50 Cent's debut album Get Rich or Die Tryin' (2003). That same year, Young Buck officially became a member of G-Unit and appeared heavily on the group's 2003 album Beg for Mercy, stepping in for Tony Yayo after Yayo was jailed on gun possession charges.

For his first solo project with G-Unit, Buck work with a variety of producers, including DJ Paul, Dre & Vidal, Juicy J, Needlz, Sha Money XL, Kon Artis, Lil Jon, Midi Mafia, and Red Spyda, with Klasic and Sean C serving as co-producers. Guest vocals were provided by fellow G-Unit groupmates 50 Cent, Lloyd Banks, Tony Yayo and the Game, as well as D-Tay, David Banner, Kon Artis, Lil' Flip, Ludacris and Stat Quo. Recording sessions took place at Record One in Los Angeles, Soundstage Studios and Quad Studios in Nashville, The Big House in Farmington, Sony Music Studios in New York, Circle House Studios in Miami and Platinum Recordings in Atlanta. The album's title alludes to the N.W.A's 1989 album Straight Outta Compton and is a neologism for the artist's hometown of Nashville, Tennessee.

== Promotion ==
The album was supported with two singles, "Let Me In" and "Shorty Wanna Ride", and two promotional singles, "Stomp" and "Look at Me Now" b/w "Bonafide Hustler".

Its lead single, Needlz-produced "Let Me In" featuring additional vocals by 50 Cent, was released prior to the album, on July 2, 2004. The song peaked at number 34 on the Billboard Hot 100, number 15 on the Hot R&B/Hip-Hop Songs and number 11 on the Hot Rap Songs in the United States, number 62 on the UK singles chart and number 12 on the Hip Hop and R&B Singles Chart in the United Kingdom, number 70 on the ARIA Top 100 Singles Chart and number 16 on the ARIA Urban Singles Chart, and number 94 in Germany. An accompanying music video was directed by Jessy Terrero.

Its second single, Lil Jon-produced "Shorty Wanna Ride", was released two days following the album. It reached number 17 on the Billboard Hot 100, number 8 on the Hot R&B/Hip-Hop Songs and number 6 on the Hot Rap Songs in the US, and has become Young Buck's highest-charting song. An accompanying music video starring Malinda Williams, which was directed by Gil Green, was inspired by the film Natural Born Killers.

The song "Stomp", the original version of which featured two Atlanta-based rappers T.I. and Ludacris, caused misunderstandings from the aforementioned guests on the track. The phrase "Me gettin' beat down? That's ludicrous" from T.I.'s verse heated up the tensions between the two as Buck perceived the line as a diss towards Luda. D-Tay could serve as a replacement for T.I. on the track, but the Game's verse ended up making it onto the album version.

The music video for promotional single "Look At Me Now/Bonafide Hustler" was directed by the Saline Project.

Straight Outta Cashville received minimal promotion after November 2004 as result of the Vibe Awards stabbing incident, in which Buck was arrested for an assault. Though the case was eventually dropped, four months had passed by since Buck himself had been able to promote the album.

== Critical reception ==
Professional ratings
Aggregate scores
Source	Rating
Metacritic	72/100
Review scores
Source	Rating
AllHipHop	4/5 stars
AllMusic	3.5/5 stars
Blender	3/5 stars
Prefix	8/10
RapReviews	8.5/10
Robert Christgau	(dud)
Rolling Stone	3.5/5 stars
Spin	B+
Vibe	3.5/5 marks

Straight Outta Cashville received positive reviews from critics. At Metacritic, which assigns a normalized rating out of 100 to reviews from mainstream critics, the album has an average score of 72 based on nine reviews. Rafael Martinez of Prefix called the it "the best G-Unit release to date," giving praise to the production, featured guests and Buck delivering above-average lyricism from the hip-hop blueprint, concluding "Cynics will criticize Straight Outta Cashville as another typical G-Unit album, only this time south of the Mason-Dixon line. But Buck is more than just a 50 flunky and can hold down an album on his own. You can’t argue with success: G-Unit is running this." Kelefa Sanneh from The New York Times said, "this album isn't revelatory, but it is convincing, and although Young Buck's subject matter never surprises, the tracks sometimes do." Rolling Stone's Jon Caramanica praised Buck for holding his own alongside featured artists, describing the album as "crime rap par excellence – unrepentantly grimy lyrics backed by soulful production." Billboard noted that Buck "combines his gritty Southern flow with hardcore beats" on Straight Outta Cashville and added that while Buck "may not be as charismatic or as lyrically compelling as his cohorts," he "still makes a strong impression."

Chris Ryan from Spin described Buck’s delivery as "a voodoo stew of Tupac and Screamin' Jay Hawkins," and characterized the record as "scarily single-minded" and "one of the most uncompromising mainstream rap discs," though "not as powerful as those classics." AllMusic editor David Jeffries wrote that the album was a "well crafted but uncompromising premiere" that expands G-Unit's reach, adding that while it covers "the same-old [...] topics,” they are delivered "with style and flair." He praised its "tight track list with nearly perfect flow," but noted Buck "keeps his personality from coming through loud and clear at times." Blender editor Nick Catucci added that Straight Outta Cashville "laces the Unit's thugsto-riches formula with chunks of the Dirty South." He stated that Buck "distinguishes himself by boasting and bullying over softer sounds." More critical perspectives included Tim O’Neil of PopMatters who felt Buck’s debut seemed "less like a debut album [...] than another sequel in a very familiar franchise," adding that "Buck himself [is] almost an afterthought" due to the "slick production and consistent pop hooks." He praised individual tracks, but concluded that the album offers "just not a lot [...] outside of the simple pleasures of the intimately familiar." Robert Christgau graded the album as a "dud", indicating "a bad record whose details rarely merit further thought".

== Commercial performance ==
In the United States, Straight Outta Cashville debuted at number three on the Billboard 200, with sales of 261,000 copies in its first week of release. It also peaked at number two on the Top R&B/Hip-Hop Albums and number-one on the Top Rap Albums charts. On January 26, 2005, the album was certified both Gold and Platinum by the Recording Industry Association of America (RIAA) for shipments a million copies in the US. By August 2007, Straight Outta Ca$hville had sold 1.1 million copies, according to Nielsen SoundScan.

The album achieved moderate success internationally, topping the Canadian Albums Chart and peaking at number seven on the Canadian R&B Albums chart. It also reached number 22 on the UK Albums chart and number five on the UK R&B Albums chart, number 18 in Scotland, number 41 in the Netherlands, number 71 in Australia, number 75 in France, number 86 in Belgium, and number 94 in Switzerland.

== Track listing ==
Straight Outta Cashville track listing
No.	Title	Writer(s)	Producer(s)	Length
1.	"I'm a Soldier" (featuring 50 Cent)	David Darnell Brown; Curtis Jackson III; Andre Harris; Vidal Davis; Dereck McKinnis	Dre & Vidal; Felony	3:34
2.	"Do It Like Me"	Brown; Chad Dexter Burnette; Michael Clervoix; Derick Prosper	Chad Beat; Sha Money XL	3:51
3.	"Let Me In"	Brown; Jackson III; Khari Cain	Needlz	3:44
4.	"Look at Me Now" (featuring Kon Artis)	Brown; Denaun Porter	Mr. Porter	4:26
5.	"Welcome to the South" (featuring Lil' Flip and David Banner)	Brown; Wesley Weston; Lavell Crump; Andy Thelusma	Red Spyda	3:50
6.	"Prices on My Head" (featuring Lloyd Banks and D-Tay)	Brown; Christopher Lloyd; Dante Reed; Jackson III; Gregory Youance; Gloria Jones; Clay McMurray; Pam Sawyer	Crown	4:21
7.	"Bonafide Hustler" (featuring 50 Cent and Tony Yayo)	Brown; Jackson III; Marvin Bernard; Jared Robert McCraw; Joshua Singleton; Homer Banks; Carl Hampton; Raymond Jackson	Diverse; Klasic^{[a]}	4:16
8.	"Shorty Wanna Ride"	Brown; Jonathan Smith	Lil' Jon	4:21
9.	"Bang Bang"	Brown; Cain; Sonny Bono	Needlz	3:34
10.	"Thou Shall"	Brown; Kevin Risto; Waynne Nugent; Andrey Vinogradov	Midi Mafia	3:15
11.	"Black Gloves"	Brown; Doug Wilson; Deleno Matthews; Bernardo Mitnik; Mike Ribas	Doug Wilson; Sean Cane^{[a]}	3:16
12.	"Stomp" (featuring the Game and Ludacris)	Brown; Jayceon Taylor; Christopher Bridges; Paul Beauregard; Jordan Houston	DJ Paul; Juicy J	4:44
13.	"Taking Hits" (featuring D-Tay)	Brown; Reed; Beauregard; Houston	DJ Paul; Juicy J	3:47
14.	"Walk With Me" (featuring Stat Quo)	Brown; Stanley Benton; Harris; V. Davis; Albert J. Tribble; George Davis	Dre & Vidal	4:10
Total length:				55:09

Bonus track(s)
No.	Title	Writer(s)	Producer(s)	Length
15.	"DPG-Unit" (featuring Snoop Dogg, Daz Dillinger, Soopafly, 50 Cent and Lloyd Banks)	Brown; Calvin Cordozar Broadus; Delmar Drew Arnaud; Priest Joseph Brooks; Jackson III; Lloyd; Robert Brandon Smith	Black Jeruz; Sha Money XL

Notes

- ^{^[a]} signifies a co-producer

Sample credits

- Track 6 contains elements from "If You Were My Woman" written by Gloria Jones, Clay McMurray and Pam Sawyer and performed by Latimore.
- Track 7 contains elements from "(If Loving You Is Wrong) I Don't Want to Be Right" written by Homer Banks, Carl Hampton and Raymond Jackson and performed by Bobby "Blue" Bland.
- Track 9 contains elements from "Bang Bang (My Baby Shot Me Down)" written by Sonny Bono and performed by Nancy Sinatra.
- Track 10 contains elements from "Smokey Rainclouds" written and performed by Andrey Vinogradov.
- Track 11 contains elements from "Que Protesten" written by Bernardo Mitnik and Mike Ribas and performed by Chucho Avellanet.
- Track 14 contains elements from "If It's in You to Do Wrong" written by Albert J. Tribble and George Davis and performed by The Impressions.

== Charts ==
=== Weekly charts ===
Weekly chart performance for Straight Outta Cashville
Chart (2004)	Peak position
Australian Albums (ARIA)	71
Belgian Albums (Ultratop Flanders)	86
Canadian Albums (Billboard)	1
Canadian R&B Albums (Nielsen SoundScan)	7
Dutch Albums (Album Top 100)	41
French Albums (SNEP)	75
Scottish Albums (Official Charts)	18
Swiss Albums (Schweizer Hitparade)	94
UK Albums (Official Charts)	22
UK R&B Albums (Official Charts)	5
US Billboard 200	3
US Top R&B/Hip-Hop Albums (Billboard)	2

=== Year-end charts ===
2004 year-end chart performance for Straight Outta Cashville
Chart (2004)	Position
US Billboard 200	87
US Top R&B/Hip-Hop Albums (Billboard)	24

2005 year-end chart performance for Straight Outta Cashville
Chart (2005)	Position
US Top R&B/Hip-Hop Albums (Billboard)	82

== Certifications ==
Certifications for Straight Outta Cashville
Region	Certification	Certified units/sales
United States (RIAA)	Platinum	1,000,000^{^}
^{^} Shipments figures based on certification alone.
