= The Massacre =

2005 studio album by 50 Cent

Studio album by 50 Cent
- Released: March 3, 2005
- Studios: 54 Sound (Ferndale, Michigan); Record One (Los Angeles); Trans Continental (Orlando, Florida); Larrabee North (Hollywood); Rock Central (Los Angeles); RMP (Orlando)
- Genres: Hip-hop; gangsta rap
- Length: 77:22
- Labels: Interscope; G-Unit; Shady; Aftermath; Violator
- Producers: 50 Cent; Dr. Dre; Eminem; Sha Money XL; Bang Out; Jeff Bass; Black Jeruz; Buckwild; Cool & Dre; Cue Beats; Dangerous LLC; Disco D; Hi-Tek; J.R. Rotem; Luis Resto; Mike Elizondo; Needlz; Scott Storch; Sire

50 Cent chronology
Get Rich or Die Tryin' (2003)	The Massacre (2005)	Bulletproof (2005)

Singles from The Massacre
- 1. "Disco Inferno" Released: December 21, 2004; 2. "Candy Shop" Released: February 8, 2005; 3. "Just a Lil Bit" Released: May 17, 2005; 4. "Outta Control" Released: September 13, 2005

The Massacre is the second studio album by the American rapper 50 Cent, released on March 3, 2005, via Interscope Records, Eminem's Shady Records, 50 Cent's G-Unit Records, and Dr. Dre's Aftermath Entertainment. With production from Dr. Dre, Eminem, Scott Storch, Sha Money XL and others, the album features guest appearances from G-Unit affiliates Tony Yayo, Olivia, Eminem and Jamie Foxx.

Preceded by the singles "Disco Inferno" and "Candy Shop", the album debuted atop the Billboard 200, selling 1.14 million copies in its first four days; it remained atop the chart for six weeks after its release. The Massacre received generally positive reviews from music critics, and was 50 Cent's second consecutive number one album on the chart. Following its release, the album spawned the Billboard Hot 100-top ten singles "Just A Lil Bit" and "Outta Control."

== Background ==
The original title for the album was revealed as The St. Valentine's Day Massacre, named after the 1929 Chicago gang murder spree known as Saint Valentine's Day Massacre. 50 Cent intended the album to be released on February 15, 2005, but Interscope was not interested. He leaked "Disco Inferno" in order to force their hand, and Interscope released it on March 7.

Originally, songs intended for the album included "Hate It or Love It", "Higher" and "Special" but the songs were eventually given to the Game's The Documentary, causing a majority of The Massacre to be reworked. Although, a G-Unit remix of "Hate it or Love It" appeared as a bonus track on this album.

After 50 Cent released the Game from his G-Unit Records imprint on live radio February 21, 2005, a shootout occurred. Paul Rosenberg of Shady Records and Jimmy Iovine of Interscope worried that the album would underperform due to the negativity of the Hot 97 shooting. 50 and the Game later entered into a truce six days after The Massacre was released, but their animosity rose up again after Game made fun of G-Unit at Hot 97's annual Summer Jam, where he first used the "G-Unot" insult, later turning to a boycott.

=== Censorship ===
The censored version of the album censors out most profanity, violence, and all drug content. The track "Gunz Come Out" has inconsistency in the editing, and contains some profanity. The opening intro removes the shooting sequence, and is cut down to 20 seconds. The album cover also removes guns in the background behind the rapper, being replaced by motifs and a gradient background. In comparison, the album is not as heavily censored as his previous album Get Rich or Die Tryin' (2003).

== Production ==
The instrumentation of the album closely mirrors that of its predecessor, incorporating string instruments and orchestral elements; however, cinematic themes are no longer the central focus. This album introduces numerous new musical components, including jazz rap and R&B influences that evoke the essence of early 1990s New York hip-hop. A notable addition to the album's sound is the influence of Scott Storch, whose musical ideas infuse tracks like "Candy Shop" and "Just A Lil Bit" with Middle Eastern Arabic melodies layered over hard-hitting hip-hop beats. Another notable but underrated addition to the album's sound is Buckwild's production on "I Don't Need 'Em", which uses a jazz rap instrumental. Furthermore, the album benefits from exceptional mixing, primarily attributed to Dr. Dre's involvement, as was the case with the previous album. The album's production credits include Bang Out, Bass Brothers, Black Jeruz, Buckwild, Cool & Dre, C. Styles, Cue Beats, Disco D, Dr. Dre, Eminem, Hi-Tek, J.R. Rotem, Luis Resto, Mike Elizondo, Needlz, Scott Storch, and Sha Money XL.

== Commercial performance ==
With a release in the middle of the sales week, The Massacre sold 1.14 million copies in its first four days of release, becoming the sixth-largest opening week for an album at the time since Nielsen SoundScan began tracking sales in 1991. It holds the record for the largest opening week sales for a sophomore studio album ever,as well as the second largest opening week for a hip-hop album overall, behind Eminem's The Marshall Mathers LP (2000), which sold 1.76 million copies in its first week. Mariah Carey's The Emancipation of Mimi replaced it as number one in late April 2005, as The Massacre reached 3 million units sold. In 2025, The Massacre was certified six times platinum for combined sales and album-equivalent units of at least six million copies in the United States. It has sold over nine million copies worldwide.

In 2005, The Massacre was ranked as the number one album of the year on the Billboard 200.

== Critical reception ==
Professional ratings
Aggregate scores
Source	Rating
Metacritic	66/100
Review scores
Source	Rating
AllMusic	3.5/5 stars
Blender	4/5 stars
Entertainment Weekly	B−
The Guardian	1/5 stars
Los Angeles Times	3/4 stars
NME	8/10
Pitchfork	7.0/10
Rolling Stone	4/5 stars
Spin	B−
The Village Voice	A−

The Massacre received generally positive reviews from music critics; it holds a score of 66 out of 100 at Metacritic. Vibe magazine found it "full of finger-pointing panache" and wrote that "50 delivers a taut, albeit less explosive, album aimed at both silencing his detractors and keeping the ladies satisfied". NME observed "a new depth to the murderous lyricism" from 50 Cent on the album. Greg Tate, writing in The Village Voice, said that, like Tupac, 50 Cent is "a ruffian who knows the value of a good pop hook", and called The Massacre "the most diabolically sensous collection of baby-making gangsta music since Pac's All Eyez." Kelefa Sanneh of The New York Times found the album to be "nearly as addictive as its predecessor" and called 50 Cent "a crafty songwriter, specializing in obvious but nearly irresistible tracks that sound better the more you hear them." In his review for The Village Voice, Robert Christgau said that 50 Cent's "ugly gangsta lies" are "incidental to the mood of the piece, which is friendly, relaxed, good-humored, and in the groove."

In a mixed review, Nathan Rabin of The A.V. Club said that, although its strengths lie in 50 Cent's "dark charisma" and "fluid delivery", the album is marred by flaws typical of "big rap releases: At nearly 78 minutes, it's far too long, wildly uneven, and not particularly cohesive sonically or thematically." Uncut magazine wrote that, despite 50 Cent's "cool menace", "not even tight productions from Eminem and Dre can stop things from flagging midway." Lynne D. Johnson of Spin felt that it lacks "originality" and makes artistic concessions: "He's tryin' too hard to be everything to everybody." In a negative review for The Guardian, Alexis Petridis panned him as a lyricist and felt that the album lacks "any of the factors that make the best gangsta rap disturbingly compelling ... There's nothing except a string of cliches so limited that repetition is unavoidable".

=== Accolades ===
The Massacre was nominated at the 2006 Grammy Awards for Best Rap Album, but lost to Kanye West's Late Registration. It was ranked the 25th best album of the year by Rolling Stone.

According to 50 Cent, the album received more mixed reviews than its predecessor Get Rich Or Die Tryin' because he was focused more on the hooks and song structure: "People fought love for the things they see are significant. Jimmy Iovine was a producer ... he loves the significance of production. He loves Dre. I don’t give a fuck what I made ... look, I made my whole second album as a 10-record. I knew they wasn't my best verses but my choruses were right so I focused on my song structure."

== Track listing ==
No.	Title	Writer(s)	Producer(s)	Length
1.	"Intro (The Massacre)"	Lindsay Collins	Eminem	0:41
2.	"In My Hood"	Curtis Jackson; Teraike Crawford; Phillip Pitts; Marshall Mathers; Luis Resto	C. Styles; Bang Out; Eminem^{[a]}; Resto^{[a]}	3:51
3.	"This Is 50"	Jackson; Rashad Smith; Michael Clervoix	Sha Money XL; Black Jeruz	3:04
4.	"I'm Supposed to Die Tonight"	Jackson; Mathers; Steve King; Resto	Eminem; Resto^{[a]}	3:51
5.	"Piggy Bank"	Jackson; Khari Cain	Needlz	4:15
6.	"Gatman and Robbin" (featuring Eminem)	Jackson; Mathers; Jeffrey Bass; Mark Bass; Resto; Neal Hefti	Eminem; Bass Brothers^{[a]}; Resto^{[a]}	3:46
7.	"Candy Shop" (featuring Olivia)	Jackson; Scott Storch	Scott Storch	3:29
8.	"Outta Control"	Jackson; Andre Young; Mike Elizondo; Christopher Pope; Steve Standard	Dr. Dre; Mike Elizondo	3:21
9.	"Get in My Car"	Jackson; Tony Cotrell	Hi-Tek	4:05
10.	"Ski Mask Way"	Jackson; Dave Shayman; Mathers; Resto; Bunny Sigler; Ryan Presson	Disco D; Eminem^{[a]}; Resto^{[a]}	3:05
11.	"A Baltimore Love Thing"	Jackson; Quentin Staples; Norma Toney	Cue Beats	4:17
12.	"Ryder Music"	Jackson; Cotrell	Hi-Tek	3:51
13.	"Disco Inferno"	Jackson; Crawford; Pitts	C. Styles; Bang Out	3:34
14.	"Just a Lil Bit"	Jackson; Storch	Scott Storch	3:57
15.	"Gunz Come Out"	Jackson; Young; Elizondo	Dr. Dre; Elizondo	4:24
16.	"My Toy Soldier" (featuring Tony Yayo)	Jackson; Marvin Bernard; Mathers; Resto	Eminem; Resto^{[a]}	3:44
17.	"Position of Power"	Jackson; J.R. Rotem	J.R. Rotem	3:12
18.	"Build You Up" (featuring Jamie Foxx)	Jackson; Storch	Scott Storch	2:55
19.	"God Gave Me Style"	Jackson; Cain; Leonard Caston, Jr.; Tom McFadden	Needlz	3:01
20.	"So Amazing" (featuring Olivia)	Jackson; Rotem; Jasmin Lopez	J.R. Rotem	3:16
21.	"I Don't Need 'Em"	Jackson; Anthony Best	Buckwild	3:20
22.	"Hate It or Love It (G-Unit Remix)" (bonus track; featuring The Game, Tony Yayo, Young Buck and Lloyd Banks)	Jackson; Allan Felder; Jayceon Taylor; Andre Lyon; Marcello Valenzano; Bernard; Norman Harris; Ron Barker	Cool & Dre	4:23
Total length:				77:22

2006 France re-release bonus tracks
No.	Title	Writer(s)	Producer(s)	Length
21.	"Window Shopper"	Jackson; Crawford; J.H. Turnbull; Bob Marley	C. Styles; Sire	3:12
22.	"Best Friend" (featuring Olivia)	Jackson	Hi-Tek	4:14
Total length:				84:48

Notes

- ^{^[a]} signifies an additional producer.
- "Intro" is excluded from the 2006 France edition.

Sample credits

- "Intro" contains elements from "What Up Gangsta" performed by 50 Cent.
- "This Is 50" contains elements from "Things Done Changed" performed by The Notorious B.I.G.
- "I'm Supposed to Die Tonight" contains vocal samples of "Vocal Planet" performed by Spectrasonics.
- "Gatman and Robbin'" contains replayed elements from "Batman Theme" composed by Danny Elfman.
- "Candy Shop" contains a sample of "Love Break" performed by The Salsoul Orchestra (uncredited).
- "Outta Control" contains an interpolation from "Set It Off" performed by Strafe.
- "Ski Mask Way" contains elements from "What Am I Waiting For" performed by The O'Jays and resung elements from "Cell Therapy" performed by Goodie Mob.
- "A Baltimore Love Thing" contains elements from "I'll Be Waiting There for You" performed by The Dells.
- "God Gave Me Style" contains elements from "Each Day I Cry a Little" performed by Eddie Kendricks.
- "I Don't Need 'Em" contains elements from "Nobody Knows" performed by S.C.L.C.

== Personnel ==
Credits for The Massacre adapted from Allmusic.

- 50 Cent – executive producer, author
- Bang Out – producer
- Jeff Bass – keyboards, producer
- Mark Bass – producer
- Steve Baughman – engineer, mixing
- Akane Behrens – engineer
- Black Jeruz – producer
- Buckwild – producer
- Jeff Burns – mixing assistant, assistant
- Dave Cabrera – keyboards
- Tony Campana – engineer
- Larry Chatman – project coordinator
- Lindsay Collins – voices, speech/speaker/speaking part
- Cool – producer
- Ruben Cruz – background vocals
- Cue Beats – producer
- Dion Jenkins – background vocals
- Disco D – producer
- Dr. Dre – producer, executive producer, mixing
- Mike Elizondo – bass, guitar, keyboards, sitar, producer
- Eminem – producer, executive producer, mixing
- Nicole Frantz – creative assistance
- Brian "Big Bass" Gardner – mastering
- Yvette Gayle – publicity
- Zach Gold – photography
- Scott Gutierrez – assistant engineer, assistant
- Tiffany Hasbourne – stylist
- Adam Hawkins – engineer
- Hi-Tek – producer
- Lionel Holoman – keyboards
- Kameron Houff – engineer
- Eric Hudson – bass
- Mauricio "Veto" Irragorri – engineer, mixing
- Tyrue "Slang" Jonas – artwork
- Rouble Kapoor – assistant engineer, mixing assistant, assistant
- Steven King – bass, guitar, mixing
- Steve Lininger – assistant engineer, assistant
- Jared Lopez – engineer
- Andrew Mains – editing
- Kyla Miller – engineer
- Needlz – producer
- Traci Nelson – background vocals
- Alex Ortiz – engineer
- Conesha Owens – background vocals
- Kirdis Postelle – project coordinator
- Chuck Reed – engineer
- Luis Resto – horn, keyboards, producer
- Robert "Roomio" Reyes – assistant engineer, assistant
- Roberto Reyes – assistant
- J.R. Rotem – producer
- David Saslow – video
- Kelly Sato – marketing coordinator
- Ed Scratch – engineer
- Les Scurry – production coordination
- Sha Money XL – producer, engineer, executive producer, mixing
- Randy Sosin – video
- Nancie Stern – sample clearance
- Scott Storch – producer
- Chris Styles – producer
- Rob Tewlow – producer
- Patrick Viala – mixing
- Che Vicious – programming
- Barbara Wilson – background vocals
- Brandon Winslow – assistant
- Ravid Yosef – editing

== Charts ==
=== Weekly charts ===
Weekly chart performance for The Massacre
Chart (2005)	Peak position
Australian Albums (ARIA)	2
Australian Urban Albums (ARIA)	1
Austrian Albums (Ö3 Austria)	2
Belgian Albums (Ultratop Flanders)	3
Belgian Albums (Ultratop Wallonia)	9
Canadian Albums (Billboard)	1
Danish Albums (Hitlisten)	8
Dutch Albums (Album Top 100)	2
European Albums (Billboard)	3
Finnish Albums (Suomen virallinen lista)	7
French Albums (SNEP)	3
German Albums (Offizielle Top 100)	1
Greek Albums (IFPI)	2
Hungarian Albums (MAHASZ)	11
Icelandic Albums (Tónlist)	2
Irish Albums (IRMA)	1
Italian Albums (FIMI)	13
New Zealand Albums (RMNZ)	1
Norwegian Albums (VG-lista)	3
Portuguese Albums (AFP)	5
Scottish Albums (Official Charts)	1
Spanish Albums (Promusicae)	32
Swedish Albums (Sverigetopplistan)	10
Swiss Albums (Schweizer Hitparade)	2
UK Albums (Official Charts)	1
UK R&B Albums (Official Charts)	1
US Billboard 200	1
US Top R&B/Hip-Hop Albums (Billboard)	1

=== Year-end charts ===
Year-end chart performance for The Massacre
Chart (2005)	Position
Australian Albums (ARIA)	39
Austrian Albums (Ö3 Austria)	19
Belgian Albums (Ultratop Flanders)	10
Belgian Albums (Ultratop Wallonia)	21
Danish Albums (Hitlisten)	62
Dutch Albums (Album Top 100)	27
European Albums (Billboard)	7
French Albums (SNEP)	41
German Albums (Offizielle Top 100)	8
New Zealand Albums (RMNZ)	17
Swiss Albums (Schweizer Hitparade)	11
UK Albums (OCC)	29
US Billboard 200	1
US Top R&B/Hip-Hop Albums (Billboard)	1
Worldwide Albums (IFPI)	3

== Certifications ==
Certifications for The Massacre
Region	Certification	Certified units/sales
Australia (ARIA)	Platinum	70,000^{^}
Belgium (BRMA)	Gold	25,000^{*}
Canada (Music Canada)	3× Platinum	300,000^{^}
Denmark (IFPI Danmark)	3× Platinum	60,000^{‡}
France (SNEP)	Gold	100,000^{*}
Germany (BVMI)	2× Platinum	400,000^{‡}
Greece (IFPI Greece)	Gold	10,000^{^}
Ireland (IRMA)	2× Platinum	30,000^{^}
Italy (FIMI)	Gold	25,000^{‡}
Japan (RIAJ)	Gold	100,000^{^}
New Zealand (RMNZ)	5× Platinum	75,000^{‡}
Portugal (AFP)	Gold	20,000^{^}
Russia (NFPF)	3× Platinum	60,000^{*}
Switzerland (IFPI Switzerland)	Platinum	40,000^{^}
United Kingdom (BPI)	3× Platinum	900,000^{‡}
United States (RIAA)	6× Platinum	6,000,000^{‡}
Summaries
Europe (IFPI)	Platinum	1,000,000^{*}
Worldwide	—	13,000,000
^{*} Sales figures based on certification alone.^{^} Shipments figures based on certification alone.^{‡} Sales+streaming figures based on certification alone.

== Special edition ==
The Massacre (Special Edition)

Studio album by 50 Cent
- Released: September 6, 2005
- Recorded: 2004–2005
- Genres: Hip-hop; gangsta rap
- Length: 73:47
- Labels: Interscope; Shady; Aftermath; G-Unit
- Producers: Dr. Dre; Eminem; Sha Money XL; Bass Brothers; Black Jeruz; Buckwild; Cue Beats; Dangerous LLC; Disco D; Hi-Tek; J.R. Rotem; Mike Elizondo; Needlz; Scott Storch

50 Cent chronology
The Massacre (2005)	The Massacre (Special Edition) (2005)	Curtis (2007)

Singles from The Massacre
- 1. "Disco Inferno" Released: November 28, 2004; 2. "Candy Shop" Released: January 15, 2005; 3. "Just a Lil Bit" Released: May 10, 2005; 4. "Outta Control (Remix)" Released: September 6, 2005

=== Background ===
The album was re-released on September 6, 2005, as the Special edition. It included a remix of "Outta Control" featuring Mobb Deep, which replaces the original version of the song as track eight. This edition included a bonus DVD with music videos for all of the album's tracks (with the exception of the intro), and the trailer for the film Get Rich or Die Tryin', which released two months later. Likely due to the then-ongoing feud between 50 Cent and The Game, this version omits the G-Unit remix to "Hate It or Love It" as the twenty-second track. Once the special edition was released, The Massacre re-entered the top three of the Billboard 200 at number two, being blocked from number one by Kanye West's Late Registration. The original version was also re-issued using the special edition track listing leaving out the parts for the DVD.

==== Track listing ====
No.	Title	Writer(s)	Producer(s)	Length
1.	"Intro"	Lindsay Collins	Eminem	0:41
2.	"In My Hood"	Jackson; Crawford; Pitts; Mathers; Resto	C. Styles; Bang Out; Eminem^{[a]}; Resto^{[a]}	3:51
3.	"This Is 50"	Jackson; Smith; Clervoix	Black Jeruz; Sha Money XL	3:04
4.	"I'm Supposed to Die Tonight"	Jackson; Mathers; Resto; King	Eminem	3:51
5.	"Piggy Bank"	Jackson; Cain	Needlz	4:15
6.	"Gatman and Robbin'" (featuring Eminem)	Jackson; Mathers; Jeffrey Bass; Mark Bass; Resto; Hefti	Eminem; Bass Brothers^{[a]}	3:46
7.	"Candy Shop" (featuring Olivia)	Jackson; Storch	Storch	3:29
8.	"Outta Control (Remix)" (featuring Mobb Deep)	Jackson; Young; Elizondo; Mark Batson; Albert Johnson; Kejuan Muchita; Pope; Standard	Dr. Dre; Elizondo	4:07
9.	"Get in My Car"	Jackson; Cotrell	Hi-Tek	4:05
10.	"Ski Mask Way"	Jackson; Sigler; Resto; Mathers; Shayman; Presson	Disco D	3:05
11.	"A Baltimore Love Thing"	Jackson; Staples; Toney	Cue Beats	4:17
12.	"Ryder Music"	Jackson; Cotrell	Hi-Tek	3:51
13.	"Disco Inferno"	Jackson; Crawford; Pitts	C. Styles; Bang Out	3:34
14.	"Just a Lil Bit"	Jackson; Storch	Storch	3:57
15.	"Gunz Come Out"	Jackson; Young; Elizondo	Dr. Dre; Elizondo	4:24
16.	"My Toy Soldier" (featuring Tony Yayo)	Jackson; Bernard; Mathers; Resto; King	Eminem	3:44
17.	"Position of Power"	Jackson; Rotem	J.R. Rotem	3:12
18.	"Build You Up" (featuring Jamie Foxx)	Jackson; Storch	Storch	2:55
19.	"God Gave Me Style"	Jackson; Cain; Caston, Jr.; McFadden	Needlz	3:01
20.	"So Amazing" (featuring Olivia)	Jackson; Rotem; Lopez	J.R. Rotem	3:16
21.	"I Don't Need 'Em"	Jackson; Best	Buckwild	3:20
Total length:				73:45

Notes

- ^{^[a]} signifies an additional producer.

Sample credits Information taken from The Massacre liner notes:

- "Intro" contains elements from "What Up Gangsta" performed by 50 Cent
- "I'm Supposed to Die Tonight" contains samples of "Warning" by The Notorious B.I.G.
- "Gatman and Robbin'" contains replayed elements from "Batman Theme"
- "Candy Shop" contains a sample of "Love Break" performed by The Salsoul Orchestra (uncredited)
- "Ski Mask Way" contains elements from "What Am I Waiting For" performed by The O'Jays and resung elements from "Cell Therapy" performed by Goodie Mob
- "A Baltimore Love Thing" contains elements from "I'll Be Waiting There For You" performed by The Dells
- "God Gave Me Style" contains elements from "Each Day I Cry A Little" performed by Eddie Kendricks
- "I Don't Need 'Em" contains elements from "Nobody Knows" performed by S.C.L.C.

== See also ==
- List of number-one albums from the 2000s (UK)
- List of number-one albums in 2005 (New Zealand)
- List of number-one albums of 2005 (Ireland)
- List of number-one albums of 2005 (U.S.)
- Lists of fastest-selling albums
