= Chaise Électrique =

""Chaise Électrique""

Single by Fally Ipupa featuring Olivia

from the album Arsenal De Belles Melodies
- Released: June 22, 2009
- Recorded: 2008
- Genre: Congolese rumba; hip hop; R&B
- Length: 3:55
- Label: Obouo Music
- Songwriters: Fally Ipupa; Olivia
- Producer: David Monsoh

Fally Ipupa singles chronology
"Droit Chemin" (2006)	"Chaise Électrique"" (2009)	"Sweet Life "La vie est belle"" (2013)

Olivia singles chronology
"Cherry Pop" (2007)	"Chaise Électrique"" (2009)	"December" (2011)

"Chaise Électrique" is a song recorded by Congolese singer Fally Ipupa, from his third studio album, Arsenal De Belles Melodies (2009). It features R&B singer and former G-Unit member Olivia. It was released at the same time as the album, along with a video.
