= Twist It =

Single by Olivia featuring Lloyd Banks
- Released: March 5, 2005
- Length: 3:29
- Label: G-Unit; Interscope
- Songwriters: Olivia Longott; Christopher Lloyd; David Drew; Michael Clervoix III; Curtis Jackson
- Producer: Jelly Roll

Olivia singles chronology
"Candy Shop" (2005)	"Twist It" (2005)	"So Sexy" (2005)

Lloyd Banks singles chronology
"Karma" (2004)	"Twist It" (2005)	"Hands Up" (2006)

"Twist It" is a song by American R&B singer Olivia. It was written by Olivia along with David Drew, Michael Clervoix III, Lloyd Banks and Curtis Jackson for her unreleased second studio album, her G-Unit debut Behind Closed Doors, while production on the track was helmed by Jelly Roll. "Twist It" features guest vocals by rapper Banks. Released as the first single from Behind Closed Doors, the song peaked at number 89 on the US Billboard Hot 100.

== Music video ==
A music video for "Twist It" was directed by 50 Cent and Billy Parks and filmed on May 20, 2005. It features cameo appearances by 50 Cent, Tony Yayo, Lil Scrappy, Mobb Deep, M.O.P., DJ Kayslay Winky Wright, and Ron Artest.

== Track listing ==
Digital single

- "Twist It" (featuring Lloyd Banks) – 3:25

== Charts ==
Weekly chart performance for "Twist It"
Chart (2005)	Peak position
US Billboard Hot 100	89
US Hot R&B/Hip-Hop Songs (Billboard)	50

== Release history ==
Region	Date	Format(s)	Label(s)	Ref.
United States	June 21, 2005	Rhythmic contemporary radio	G-Unit, Interscope	
