= Ron Gillyard =

Ron Gillyard is a record executive with nearly 20 years experience in the entertainment industry. He is a Grammy Award winner.

== Start in music ==
Gillyard started in the music business as an intern at Columbia Records. He has been employed by Clive Davis, Chief Creative Officer of Sony Music Entertainment Worldwide; Jimmy Iovine, chairman of Interscope-Geffen-A&M; Irving Azoff, chairman of Live Nation Entertainment; and Sean "Diddy" Combs, owner of Bad Boy Entertainment Worldwide (which includes the Sean John clothing line).

Some artists with whom he has worked include Stevie Wonder, Boyz II Men, Luther Vandross, BeBe & CeCe Winans, Alicia Keys, India.Arie, Mary J. Blige, Sean Diddy Combs, Will Smith, 50 Cent and Eminem. In 2011 Gillyard was awarded his first Grammy award for his work as producer of Bebe & Cece Winans’ album "Still" (Best Contemporary R&B Gospel Album).

== Career ==
Gillyard serves as the Chief Growth Officer of Quantasy, an award-winning full-service digital media agency specializing in social media, where is also Partner. Quantasy delivers premium interactive and social content for clients in the tech, automotive, entertainment, not-for-profit and financial sectors. Named by Inc. Magazine as one of America’s fastest growing private companies in 2019, Quantasy serves its clients by positioning them to embrace and utilize emerging digital, social, and communication tools to build and enhance their brands.

== Theater life ==
Most recently, Gillyard has had the pleasure of producing the musical, BORN FOR THIS, created by his former client, Bebe Winans, and playwright Charles Randolph-Wright. BORN FOR THIS has run in Washington, DC, Atlanta, GA, Los Angeles, CA, and Boston, MA. Gillyard produced the runs in LA and Boston and has positioned the show for a run on Broadway.

== Personal life ==
Born and raised in Miami, Florida, Gillyard graduated from Howard University with a degree in Finance. He is married with three children and resides in Los Angeles.
