= Marcus Raboy =

American film and music video director (born 1965)

- Born: November 30, 1965 (age 60); New York City, U.S.
- Occupations: Film director, music video director
- Years active: 1991–present

Marcus Raboy (born November 30, 1965) is an American film and music video director.

Since the early 1990s, Raboy has amassed a large number of music video credits, directing music videos for Mary J. Blige, Dixie Chicks, Rihanna, Luther Vandross, Shakira, Santana, and Westlife among other notable artists.

His feature film credits are Friday After Next (2002) and Janky Promoters (2009) both starring Ice Cube and Mike Epps.

Raboy grew up in New York City and attended New York University. He is managed by David Naylor & Associates and currently resides in Los Angeles.

== Music videos ==
=== 1991 ===
- Naughty by Nature – "O.P.P." (co-directed with Rodd Houston)

=== 1992 ===
- A.D.O.R. - "Let It All Hang Out"
- Mary J. Blige – "Real Love"
- Mary J. Blige – "Reminisce"
- EPMD featuring K-Solo & Redman – "Head Banger"
- Pete Rock & C.L. Smooth – "They Reminisce Over You (T.R.O.Y.)"
- Ice Cube – "Wicked"
- Da Lench Mob – "Guerillas in tha Mist"
- Das EFX – "They Want EFX"

=== 1993 ===
- Run–D.M.C. – "Down with the King"
- Sting – "Demolition Man"
- Faith No More and Boo-Yaa T.R.I.B.E. – "Another Body Murdered"
- Lisa Stansfield – "Little Bit of Heaven"
- P.M. Dawn – "Plastic"

=== 1994 ===
- Ice Cube – "You Know How We Do It"
- Pete Rock & C.L. Smooth – "I Got a Love"

=== 1995 ===
- Faith Evans – "Soon As I Get Home"
- Faith No More – "Digging the Grave" (credited as Alan Smithee)
- Mary J. Blige – "You Bring Me Joy"
- Rancid – "Time Bomb"

=== 1996 ===
- Busta Rhymes – "It's a Party"
- Faith Evans – "I Just Can't"
- Luscious Jackson – "Naked Eye"

=== 1997 ===
- Sting & Pras – "Roxanne '97" (Puff Daddy remix)

=== 1999 ===
- Black Rob – "You Don't Know Me"
- 112 – "Your Letter"
- LFO – "Summer Girls"
- Santana featuring Rob Thomas – "Smooth"
- Faith Evans – "Never Gonna Let You Go"
- Rah Digga – "Tight"
- 112 – "Love You Like I Did"
- Mary J. Blige – "Deep Inside"
- Goodie Mob featuring Big Boi and Backbone – "Get Rich to This"

=== 2000 ===
- Guru featuring Angie Stone – "Keep Your Worries"
- Santana featuring The Product G&B – "Maria Maria"
- Montell Jordan – "Once Upon a Time"
- Carl Thomas – "I Wish"
- The Notorious B.I.G. featuring Junior M.A.F.I.A. – "Biggie"
- Santana featuring Everlast – "Put Your Lights On"
- Lil' Zane featuring 112 – "Callin' Me"
- Lil' Kim – "No Matter What They Say"
- Carl Thomas – "Summer Rain"
- Guru featuring Angie Stone – "Street Soul"
- Wyclef Jean featuring Mary J. Blige – "911"
- Carl Thomas – "Emotional"
- Musiq Soulchild – "Just Friends (Sunny)"
- Dream – "He Loves U Not"
- Babyface – "Reason for Breathing"

=== 2001 ===
- Olivia – "Bizounce"
- Jon B. – "Don't Talk"
- Dream – "This Is Me"
- Staind – "Fade"
- Backstreet Boys – "More than That"
- Faith Evans featuring Ja Rule, Vita & Caddillac Tah – "Good Life"
- LFO – "Every Other Time"
- O-Town – "All or Nothing"
- Luther Vandross – "Take You Out"
- O-Town – "We Fit Together"

=== 2002 ===
- Dixie Chicks – "Long Time Gone"
- Westside Connection – "It's the Holidaze"
- Luther Vandross – "Can Heaven Wait?"

=== 2004 ===
- Westlife - "Ain't That a Kick in the Head"
- Westlife - "Smile"
- Westlife - "Fly Me to the Moon"
- Wyclef Jean – "Take Me as I Am"
- Twista featuring R. Kelly – "So Sexy"
- Marc Anthony – "¿Ahora Quién?"
- Shania Twain & Billy Currington – "Party for Two" (Country version)
- Shania Twain & Mark McGrath – "Party for Two" (Pop version)

=== 2005 ===
- Tsunami Relief: Mary J. Blige, Andrea Bocelli, Phil Collins, Robert Downey Jr., Josh Groban, Elton John, Kelly Osbourne, Ozzy Osbourne, P!nk, Gavin Rossdale, Ringo Starr, Gwen Stefani, Rod Stewart, Steven Tyler and Velvet Revolver – "Tears in Heaven"
- Josh Kelley – "Only You"
- Cuban Link – "Sugar Daddy" featuring Mýa
- Rihanna – "If It's Lovin' that You Want"
- Floetry featuring Common – "SupaStar"
- SHeDAISY – "God Bless the American Housewife"
- Lola – "No Strings"

=== 2006 ===
- Bubba Sparxxx featuring Ying Yang Twins – "Ms. New Booty"
- 50 Cent featuring Olivia – "Best Friend"
- Ice Cube – "Why We Thugs"
- Pitbull featuring Lil Jon and Ying Yang Twins "Bojangles"
- Lil Scrappy – "Gangsta Gangsta"
- Danity Kane – "Ride for You"
- Ice Cube featuring Snoop Dogg and Lil Jon – "Go to Church"
- Lil Scrappy featuring Sean P of YoungBloodZ and E-40 – "Oh Yeah (Work)"

=== 2007 ===
- Katharine McPhee – "Love Story"
- Sean Kingston – "Beautiful Girls"
- The Cheetah Girls – "Fuego"

=== 2008 ===
- K'naan – "ABCs"

=== 2010 ===
- Mary J. Blige featuring Jay Sean – "Each Tear"
- Shakira – "Waka Waka (This Time for Africa)"

=== 2011 ===
- Avril Lavigne – "What the Hell"
- Charice – "One Day"

=== 2012 ===
- Whitney Houston & Jordin Sparks – "Celebrate"

== Other directing credits ==
- Friday After Next (2002)
- Platinum (2003, 1 episode)
- The Life and Times of Marcus Felony Brown (2008, TV film)
- Janky Promoters (2009)
- Paul F. Tompkins: Crying & Driving (2015)
- Vir Das: Abroad Understanding (2017)
- Pete Holmes: Dirty Clean (2018)
- Anthony Jeselnik: Fire In The Maternity Ward (2019)
