= Candy Shop =

2005 single by 50 Cent featuring Olivia

Single by 50 Cent featuring Olivia

from the album The Massacre
- B-side: "Disco Inferno"
- Released: February 8, 2005
- Genre: East Coast hip-hop; dirty rap
- Length: 3:29
- Label: Interscope; Aftermath; Shady; G-Unit
- Songwriters: Curtis Jackson; Scott Storch
- Producer: Scott Storch

50 Cent singles chronology
"Hate It or Love It" (2005)	"Candy Shop" (2005)	"MJB da MVP" (2005)

Olivia singles chronology
"Are U Capable" (2001)	"Candy Shop" (2005)	"Twist It" (2005)

Music video
- "Candy Shop" on YouTube

"Candy Shop" is the second single by rapper 50 Cent from his second commercial album, The Massacre (2005). It features Olivia and was written by 50 Cent and the song's producer, Scott Storch. The single was released through Interscope Records, Eminem's Shady Records, Dr. Dre's Aftermath Entertainment, and 50 Cent's G-Unit Records.

"Candy Shop" peaked at number one on the Billboard Hot 100, becoming 50 Cent's third number one single and fifth top-ten single. It received mixed reviews from critics, with some calling it a retread of 50 Cent's collaboration with Lil' Kim on "Magic Stick" (2003). At the 2006 Grammy Awards, it was nominated for Best Rap Song, and at the 2005 MTV Video Music Awards, the music video was nominated for Best Male Video.

== Background ==
In an interview with XXL magazine, rapper Fat Joe claimed that he helped produce the track while working with producer Scott Storch. He stated:

"I'm pretty sure the world don't know we actually produced Candy Shop together. I produced it with him (Storch) ... Scott called me like 50 times, 100 times: 'Yo, you sure you don't want to use it? 50 Cent called me. 50 Cent want it.' I never had a problem with this dude. I was like, 'Go ahead.'"

When writing the song, 50 Cent stated:

"I attempted to be as sexual as possible, from a male perspective, without being vulgar or obscene."

== Composition ==
"Candy Shop" is a mid-tempo dancefloor track. The song was produced by Scott Storch, who took influence from Middle Eastern music. The track samples The Salsoul Orchestra's "Love Break". The production was described by IGN as having a "Middle Eastern tinge" with synthesized strings that "unleash a darkly atonal whirl that sounds too much like something either Timbaland or The Neptunes or Mannie Fresh have concocted". The Guardian wrote that the production contains "wan-sounding imitations of the Neptunes' sparse, breathy funk". PopMatters described the bridge as being "relaxed yet faintly ominous" with 50 Cent and Olivia crooning: "Girl what we do (what we do) / And where we do (and where we do) / The things we do (things we do) / Are just between me and you (oh yeah)." Rolling Stone noted the chorus for 50 Cent's "amateur-sounding tenor croon".

== Critical reception ==
The song received mixed reviews from critics. PopMatters described it as "dripping with sexual energy and cool" and is "sexy as hell, but contains a pretty unmistakable edge of hostility, macho swagger, and thunderous chest thumping." Entertainment Weekly wrote that it was an "appealing throwaway single" and lyrics such as "after you work up a sweat, you can play with the stick" are not seductions; "they're orders". MusicOMH wrote that the chemistry between 50 Cent and Olivia "is almost as explicit as the lyrics ... the bass line is made for grinding to". Author Ethan Brown, in a review of The Massacre, called the track "uninspiring" and "nearly identical" to his previous collaboration with Lil' Kim on "Magic Stick". He stated that 50 Cent seemed too content with his "hypersexual image" among other things and "not inspired enough to work beyond the same old attention-getting schemes." Pitchfork listed "Candy Shop" as a reprise of "Magic Stick" both "in beats and in timbre", and Stylus magazine said it was "more of the same" as his previous collaboration. Billboard wrote that 50 Cent "shows little growth lyrically" with the song being "typical playa-friendly fodder". The song was nominated at the 2006 Grammy Awards for Best Rap Song, but lost to Kanye West's "Diamonds from Sierra Leone".

== Chart performance ==
"Candy Shop" performed well in the United States, becoming 50 Cent's third number one single, fifth solo top-ten single, and seventh overall top-ten single. The song was a fast climber on the Hot 100, debuting at number 53 on the Billboard Hot 100. In its second week on the chart, the song jumped to number 30. "Candy Shop" then jumped to number eight in its third week. In its fourth week, the song charted at number two. It peaked at number one in its fifth week, where it remained for nine straight weeks. It remained on the chart for 23 weeks and finished the year at number eight. The track reached number one on the Hot R&B/Hip-Hop Songs, Hot Rap Tracks, and Rhythmic Top 40 charts. The song also did well on pop-oriented charts, reaching number two on the Pop 100 and number five on the Top 40 Mainstream. "Candy Shop" was helped on the Hot 100 and Pop 100 by its strong digital downloads, peaking at number one on the Hot Digital Songs chart. The RIAA certified the track quintuple platinum in 2023. Across Europe, the song reached number one in Austria, Belgium, Germany, and Switzerland, and the top five in Ireland, Norway, the Netherlands, and the United Kingdom. In Australia, the track peaked at number three, was certified Platinum by the Australian Recording Industry Association, and on the 2005 year-end chart, it was listed at number 24. It reached number two in New Zealand.

== Music video ==
The music video was directed by Jessy Terrero on January 11–12, 2005, and filmed in Hollywood, California. Due to rapper Trick Daddy's music video for "Sugar (Gimme Some)" already having candy references, 50 Cent said, "we tried to do something a little different" and not follow the same route. The video features Olivia as the lead dancer and several models including Erica Mena (as the lead girl), Chessika Cartwright (as a dominatrix) and Stephanie "Lyric" Evans (as a nurse). It features cameo appearances from Lil Scrappy and G-Unit members Lloyd Banks and Young Buck. It was nominated for Best Male Video at the 2005 MTV Video Music Awards, but lost to Kanye West's "Jesus Walks". On February 2, 2005, the video debuted on MTV's Total Request Live at number nine and remained on the chart for 46 days. It also reached number one on the MuchMusic video charts.

The music video on YouTube reached 1 billion views on November 6, 2024.

== Track listing ==
- UK CD single 1
1. "Candy Shop" – 3:31
2. "Disco Inferno" – 3:34
- UK CD single 2
1. "Candy Shop" – 3:34
2. "Candy Shop" (Instrumental) – 3:34
3. "Candy Shop" (Ringtone) – 0:38
4. "Candy Shop" (Music Video) – 5:34

== Charts ==
=== Weekly charts ===
Chart (2005)	Peak position
Australia (ARIA)	3
Australian Urban (ARIA)	1
Austria (Ö3 Austria Top 40)	1
Belgium (Ultratop 50 Flanders)	1
Belgium (Ultratop 50 Wallonia)	4
Canada (Nielsen SoundScan)	7
Canada CHR/Pop Top 30 (Radio & Records)	1
Croatia (HRT)	3
Denmark (Tracklisten)	4
European Hot 100 Singles (Billboard)	1
Finland (Suomen virallinen lista)	11
France (SNEP)	8
Germany (GfK)	1
Hungary (Single Top 10)	4
Italy (FIMI)	14
Ireland (IRMA)	2
Netherlands (Dutch Top 40)	4
Netherlands (Single Top 100)	4
New Zealand (RIANZ)	2
Norway (VG-lista)	2
Scottish Singles Sales (Official Charts)	5
Sweden (Sverigetopplistan)	18
Switzerland (Schweizer Hitparade)	1
UK Singles (Official Charts Company)	4
UK Hip Hop/R&B (Official Charts)	2
US Billboard Hot 100	1
US Hot R&B/Hip-Hop Songs (Billboard)	1
US Pop Songs (Billboard)	5
US Rap Songs (Billboard)	1

2020s weekly chart performance for "Candy Shop"
Chart (2021–2025)	Peak position
Canada Digital Song Sales (Billboard)	41
Latvia (LaIPA)	16
Romania Airplay (TopHit)	99

=== Year-end charts ===
Chart (2005)	Position
Australia (ARIA)	24
Austria (Ö3 Austria Top 40)	20
Belgium (Ultratop 50 Flanders)	14
Belgium (Ultratop 50 Wallonia)	27
Brazil (Crowley)	21
European Hot 100 Singles (Billboard)	12
France (SNEP)	79
Germany (Media Control GfK)	7
Ireland (IRMA)	16
Netherlands (Dutch Top 40)	58
Netherlands (Single Top 100)	46
New Zealand (RIANZ)	12
Switzerland (Schweizer Hitparade)	6
UK Singles (OCC)	29
UK Urban (Music Week)	8
US Billboard Hot 100	8
US Hot R&B/Hip-Hop Songs (Billboard)	22

Chart (2006)	Position
UK Singles (OCC)	178

Year-end chart performance
Chart (2025)	Position
Romania Airplay (TopHit)	196

=== Decade-end charts ===
Chart (2000–2009)	Position
Germany (Media Control AG)	98
US Billboard Hot 100	52

== Certifications ==
Region	Certification	Certified units/sales
Australia (ARIA)	Platinum	70,000^{^}
Brazil (Pro-Música Brasil)	2× Platinum	120,000^{‡}
Denmark (IFPI Danmark)	2× Platinum	180,000^{‡}
France	—	85,800
Germany (BVMI)	5× Gold	750,000^{‡}
Italy (FIMI)	Platinum	100,000^{‡}
New Zealand (RMNZ)	4× Platinum	120,000^{‡}
Spain (Promusicae)	Platinum	60,000^{‡}
United Kingdom (BPI)	2× Platinum	1,200,000^{‡}
United States (RIAA)	5× Platinum	5,000,000^{‡}
United States (RIAA) Mastertone	Platinum	1,900,000
Streaming
Greece (IFPI Greece)	Gold	1,000,000^{†}
^{^} Shipments figures based on certification alone.^{‡} Sales+streaming figures based on certification alone.^{†} Streaming-only figures based on certification alone.

== Cover versions ==
In 2011, German group The Baseballs released a rockabilly version of "Candy Shop", which reached number 69 on the Austrian singles chart. "Weird Al" Yankovic included the song in his polka medley "Polkarama!" from his 2006 album Straight Outta Lynwood. On the film Little Man, Percy P made his own mixtape over it. Folk artist Suzanne Vega sampled "Candy Shop" for her 2014 release, "Tales from the Realm of the Queen of Pentacles". The song was interpolated on Pop Smoke's 2020 single "The Woo", also featuring and produced by 50 cent, and featuring Roddy Ricch. "Candy Shop" was additionally sampled in Riton's 2023 single "Sugar", featuring Soaky Siren.

== See also ==
- List of European number-one hits of 2005
- List of number-one hits of 2005 (Austria)
- List of number-one hits of 2005 (Germany)
- List of number-one hits of 2005 (Switzerland)
- List of Hot 100 number-one singles of 2005 (U.S.)
- List of number-one R&B singles of 2005 (U.S.)
