= Olivia Longott =

American R&B singer

Olivia
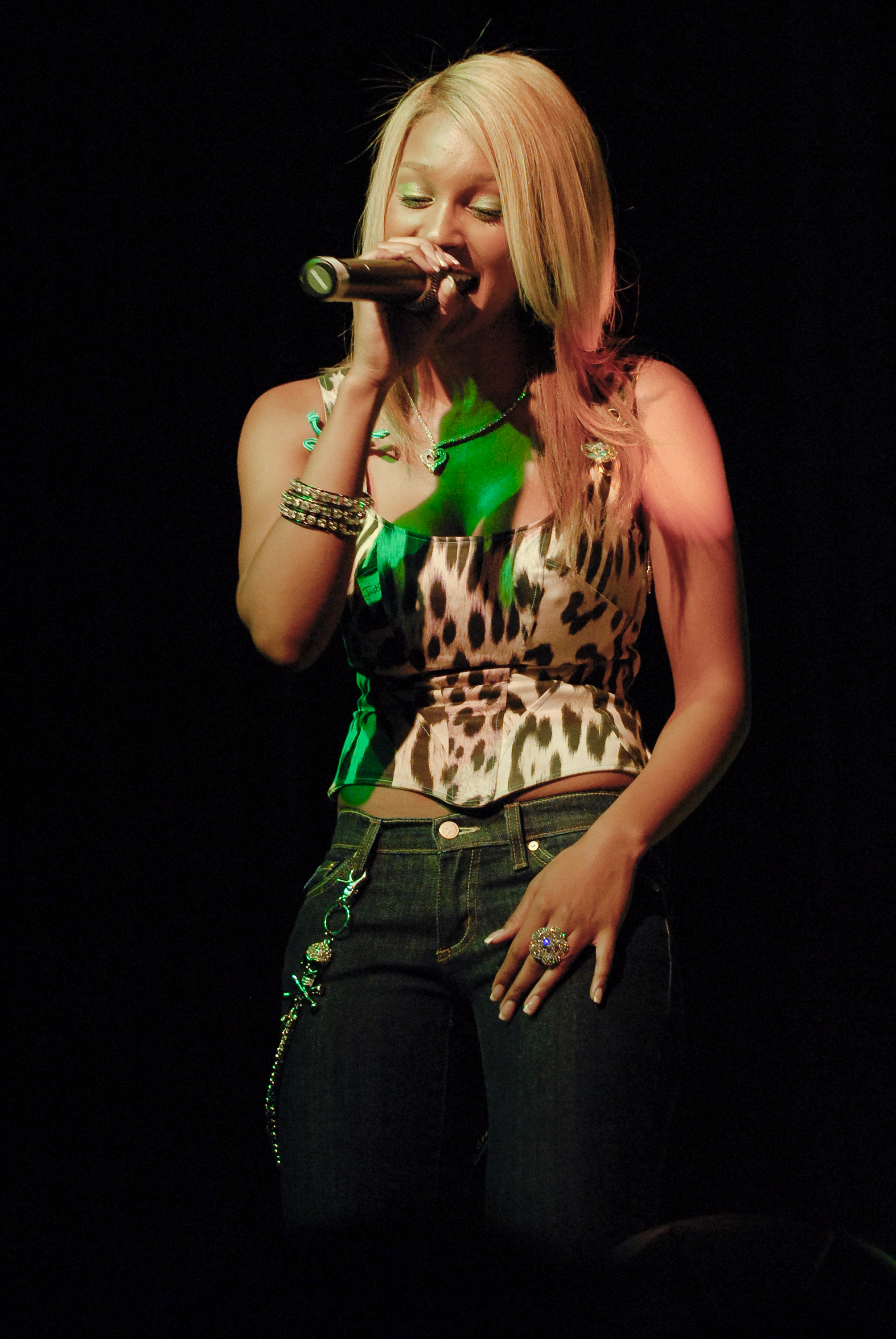
- Olivia performing in 2007

Background information
- Also known as: O-Lovely, Lady O
- Born: Olivia Theresa Longott; February 15, 1981 (age 45); New York City, U.S.
- Genres: R&B; soul; hip hop
- Occupation: Singer
- Years active: 2000–present
- Labels: J (2000–2004); Interscope/G-Unit (2004–2007); Def Jam (2007–2008); Universal Motown (2008–2010); Universal Republic (2010–2012); Wonda Music
- Formerly of: G-Unit

Olivia Theresa Longott (born February 15, 1981) is an American R&B singer. She is best known for performing with the hip hop group G-Unit and also formerly known as a cast member on the VH1 reality television series Love & Hip Hop: New York.

== Early life ==
Olivia Theresa Longott was born on February 15, 1981, in Brooklyn, New York. Longott is of mixed Indian, Jamaican, and Cuban descent.

== Career ==
=== J Records (2000–2004) ===
In 2000, Olivia became the first artist signed to Clive Davis' J Records. Her self-titled debut album Olivia was released in 2001 and featured the singles "Bizounce" which made #15 on the charts, and "Are U Capable". The album debuted at No. 55 on the Billboard 200.

=== G-Unit (2004–2007) ===
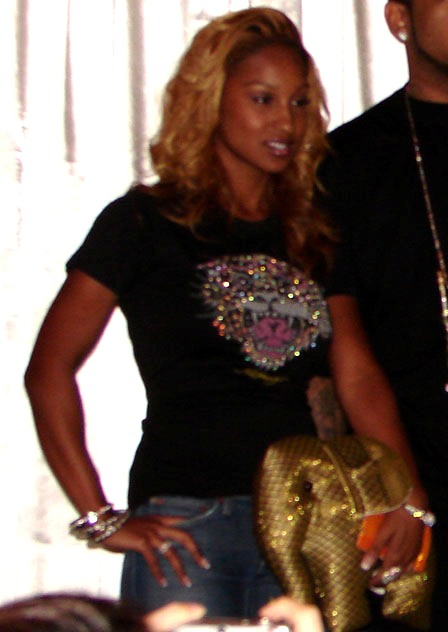
Olivia in 2006

Olivia was signed to G-Unit from 2004 to 2007. Her best known song from this period is "Candy Shop" with 50 Cent. She also released the singles "So Sexy" and "Twist It" (with Lloyd Banks) on the label.

=== 2007–present ===
In 2007, it was announced Olivia and G-Unit Records had parted ways. Her second studio album Behind Closed Doors was shelved, but leaked a year later on several mixtape websites. In 2009, Olivia did a feature for Congolese singer Fally Ipupa on his song "Chaise Électrique". On April 12, 2011, she released her first music video for "December" the first single from her then-upcoming album Show the World. The song peaked at No. 76 on the Billboard Hot R&B/Hip-Hop Songs Chart.

In December 2011, she released her second single "Walk Away". During this time, she became a cast member on VH1's Love & Hip Hop.

Olivia declined a record deal from label EMI and in April 2012, signed a deal with Jerry Wonda's Wonda Music. She has since released two promotional songs: "Soldier Girl" (featuring Mavado) and "Sun Don't Shine" (featuring Sean Kingston). In 2013, Olivia's song "Where Do I Go from Here?" hit iTunes at the No. 10 spot on the R&B/Soul charts.

After a seven-year hiatus, Olivia returned to Love & Hip Hop: New York for its tenth anniversary season.

Olivia released her second studio album, You Are, in 2024, marking her first album in 23 years. After releasing singles like "Join Me" in 2019 and "No Permission" in 2022, she released the album on September 1. The album featured the songs mentioned before, and more R&B tracks. The title track was a tribute to her mother, who died in 2018.

== Discography ==
Studio albums

- Olivia (2001)
- Behind Closed Doors (2005; unreleased)
- You Are (2024)

== Personal life ==
Olivia announced her marriage in 2019.

== Filmography ==
Film roles
Year	Title	Role	Notes
2010	Conspiracy X	Lisa	
2015	Supermodel	Tia Rivers	
2015	The Man in 3B	Jerri	
2021	Better Than My Last	Reason	Tubi original

Television roles
Year	Title	Role	Notes
2011–2013, 2019–2020	Love & Hip Hop: New York	Herself	Main role (seasons 1–2); Supporting role (seasons 3 & 10)
TBA	Conspiracy X: Reloaded	Lisa	

Video game roles
Year	Title	Role
2005	50 Cent: Bulletproof	Additional voices

== See also ==
- List of Afro-Latinos
