= XX (Fally Ipupa album) =

Studio album by Fally Ipupa
- Released: 17 April 2026 (XX); 18 September 2026 (XX : Délirium)
- Recorded: 2022–2026
- Genres: Tokooos; Congolese rumba
- Length: 63:38 (XX); 318:51 (XX : Délirium)
- Labels: Elektra France; Warner Music France
- Producers: XX: Tresor; Dany Synthé; Seysey; Joel Synthé; Ipupa; Armageddon; Layback; L.S.; Le Marabout; LMB; Nate; Rudolph Wilemse; Batundi; Joé Dwèt Filé; Manacan; Lokua Kanza; Julio Masidi; Christo K; Alex Shua; DJ Maphorisa; Kan; Nyadjiko XX : Délirium: Ipupa

Fally Ipupa chronology
Formule 7 (2022)	XX (2026)

XX is the eighth studio album by Congolese singer-songwriter Fally Ipupa. It was released by Elektra France and distributed by Warner Music France as a two-part project, with the first installment, also titled XX, released on 17 April 2026, followed by the second installment, XX : Délirium, on 18 September. Production on the first installment was handled by Tresor, Dany Synthé, Seysey, Joel Synthé, Ipupa, Armageddon, Layback, L.S., Le Marabout, LMB, Nate, Rudolph Wilemse, Batundi, Joé Dwèt Filé, Manacan, Lokua Kanza, Julio Masidi, Christo K, Alex Shua, DJ Maphorisa, Kan, and Nyadjiko.

The project was recorded over four years, from 2022 to 2026, and was developed to commemorate the 20th anniversary of Ipupa's solo career. The first installment contains 20 tracks, including a bonus track, and is built around Ipupa's tokooos style, which blends Congolese rumba and ndombolo with contemporary R&B, hip-hop, Afropop, compas, and zouk. It features guest appearances from Calema, DJ Maphorisa, Joé Dwèt Filé, Angélique Kidjo, Tresor, Lokua Kanza, Keblack, Guy2Bezbar, SDM, and Wizkid. The first installment debuted at number one on France's SNEP Top Albums chart, making Ipupa the first African artist to top the chart. In Belgium, it peaked at number 14 on the Ultratop Wallonia albums chart and number 152 on the Ultratop Flanders albums chart.

XX : Délirium consists of 51 tracks, was issued as a four-disc physical release, and was conceived as a return to Ipupa's Congolese rumba roots. It features guest appearances from Gaz Mawete, Stanley Enow, Afrik'an Legend and DJ Kawest.

== XX ==
=== Background, recording, and release ===
Following the release of his seventh studio album, Formule 7, on 28 October 2022, Ipupa disclosed in an interview with Trace Muzik that he was already working on a new urban-oriented project. He explained that he had recorded extensively and completed around 60 tracks. The record was nearly complete and only needed slight refinements to its sound and lyrics. Although it was initially slated for release in 2023, the album was delayed, and in December 2023, Ipupa disclosed that he had collaborated on a song with British actor and musician Idris Elba, but did not share any further details. In an excerpt from an interview published by Jeune Afrique on 7 October 2024, Ipupa confirmed that a surprise album was being prepared for 2025 and said that recording was progressing well. He also stated that the project would complement his forthcoming concerts at the Stade de France in Paris on 2 and 3 May 2026.

Pre-orders for the project opened on Apple Music in October 2025, and on 16 March 2026, Ipupa announced that XX would be released as a two-part project. The first installment, also titled XX, was released by Elektra France and distributed by Warner Music France on 17 April 2026. It features guest appearances from Calema, DJ Maphorisa, Joé Dwèt Filé, Angélique Kidjo, Tresor, Lokua Kanza, Keblack, Guy2Bezbar, SDM, and Wizkid. Production was handled by Tresor, Dany Synthé, Seysey, Joel Synthé, Ipupa, Armageddon, Layback, L.S., Le Marabout, LMB, Nate, Rudolph Wilemse, Batundi, Joé Dwèt Filé, Manacan, Lokua Kanza, Julio Masidi, Christo K, Alex Shua, DJ Maphorisa, Kan, and Nyadjiko.

=== Composition ===
XX contains 20 tracks built around Ipupa's tokooos style. Congolese music journalist Étienne Kambala described the album as featuring detailed songwriting, restrained vocal delivery, and layered production. Music in Africa contributors Collins Matsepe, Mandla Mhlongwa, and Lucky Mqoboli emphasized XX's focus on themes like love, life, ambition, and joy, noting how it balances emotional highs and lows. Co-producer Tresor explained that he crafted what he calls "the future sound of Congolese music" to reveal a different dimension of Ipupa for global appeal.

"Cinéma" opens the record with West African-inspired sounds and fluid instrumentation, as Ipupa sets a confident and romantic tone with melodic hooks. The collaboration "Pépélé" sees Ipupa reunite with Congolese-French rapper Guy2Bezbar after collaborating with him on Tokooos II Gold, while "Deuxième Maman" revisits his romantic persona through direct and emotionally driven lyrics. XX's international scope appears in "Alifa", which was recorded entirely in English, and continues in "Just for You" with Angélique Kidjo, whose chorus is also performed in English. This multilingual approach continues in the Afrobeats-influenced "Jam", performed in Nigerian Pidgin, Lingala, and French, alongside Nigerian singer Wizkid. The song surpassed two million Spotify streams during its first week and charted at No. 4 on the UK Afrobeats Singles Chart and No. 9 on Billboard U.S. Afrobeats Songs. On "Ma Diva", featuring Congolese-French rapper SDM, Ipupa pays tribute to Ivorian music through an excerpt from "Abidjan Farot" by the band Espoir 2000, fronted by Hugues-Patrick Ossohou, Valéry Théa Doubo, and Alexis Didier Goly. Elsewhere, "Isoler" explores salsa influences, "Si tu t'en vas" leans toward French pop style, and "Doucement", a collaboration with Haitian-French singer Joé Dwèt Filé, blends compas with Congolese rumba.

Despite this outward orientation, Ipupa maintains ties to his roots. "S'il était possible" incorporates elements of Congolese rumba within a hybrid structure, while "Bapaya", written entirely by Congolese singer Lokua Kanza, adopts a more introspective and thematic direction. The bonus track "Goût danger" extends XX's romantic motifs.

=== Artwork ===
On 6 October 2025, Ipupa published the cover art, which depicts him wearing Meta and Ray-Ban smartglasses, with the Roman numeral "XX" marking twenty years since his solo debut after leaving Quartier Latin International.

== XX : Délirium ==
=== Background, development and concept ===
Several songs were associated with XX before the project's two-part structure became clear. "Deux Êtres" was released on 9 December 2025, while "Sans Limite", released on 27 February 2026. During a livestream on 10 February, he described XX: Délirium as a "musical massacre", echoing language he had previously used for Formule 7. After the release of the first XX installment in April 2026, Délirium was more clearly presented as the rumba-focused installment of the anniversary project. On 23 April, Ipupa described it as "the best rumba album of my career", adding, "and of all time, I think".

=== Music and lyrics ===
XX: Délirium is rooted in Congolese rumba, with contemporary production incorporated into its traditional sound. Coverage surrounding its release highlighted interlocking guitars, brass arrangements, collective backing vocals and extended compositions that gradually develop into dance-oriented sections.

Lyrics largely revolve around love and relationships, touching on devotion, jealousy, breakups, emotional dependence, and romantic suffering. "Deux Êtres" is sung in French and Lingala and portrays a committed relationship built on fidelity, companionship and the ability to overcome adversity. Mbote.cd described the track as blending modern rumba, Afropop and romantic melodies. Ipupa also references Julius Caesar, the Punic Wars and the Opium Wars as metaphors for the challenges a strong relationship can survive. "Sans Limite" is a blend of Congolese rumba, Afropop and contemporary urban sounds. It presents love as unrestricted by outside pressures, with an emphasis on loyalty, passion and commitment.

"Kitamata" reinterprets Josky Kiambukuta's 1987 TPOK Jazz recording "Kita Mata Bloqué". Ipupa recorded the song for XX: Délirium as a tribute to Kiambukuta and his mother, who was especially fond of the original. Ouragan.cd reported that he contacted Kiambukuta's children regarding royalties and credited Kiambukuta as the songwriter. The track was released on 10 June 2026 alongside "Wanna Danse" and "Complices" as one of three advance tracks from Délirium. Its video was released on 26 July. The song examines romantic suffering through jealousy, possessiveness, fear of abandonment and emotional dependence. Ouragan.cd interpreted it as an examination of the "symptoms" of romantic love. The refrain includes the Lingala phrase "Pasi ya bolingo ezalaka nde somo", roughly meaning "the suffering of love can be terrible". Mbote.cd also highlighted Ipupa's vocal delivery, particularly his use of phrasing resembling sakade, an expressive style associated with Kiambukuta.

A dispute over rights and royalties emerged after the album's release, leading Ipupa to announce the removal of "Kitamata" and its video from XX: Délirium and streaming platforms. Speaking on Top Congo FM on 18 September, he said that arrangements had been made with Kiambukuta's children, but that other family members later sought payments he considered excessive. Ipupa said that although the song had been well received, he chose to withdraw it rather than allow the dispute to overshadow his intended tribute to Kiambukuta. While the video was removed, the track remained on the album. On 22 September, Kiambukuta's younger brother Albert Kiambukuta asked Ipupa to restore the song online, stating that there was no conflict between the family and the singer. He also said that Kiambukuta's siblings comprised himself and three other brothers, and denied reports that Ipupa had been pressured to pay "astronomical sums of money".

"Lost" was released on 19 August 2026 and explores heartbreak, loneliness and the sense of loss that follows the end of a relationship. Eight days later, Ipupa announced "Ami, chéri" and "Bonheur parfait". Mbote.cd reported that their accompanying music videos were scheduled to premiere together, with both released on 28 August. While "Bonheur parfait" is grounded in Congolese rumba, "Ami, chéri" incorporates kompa influences. The latter portrays a romantic relationship shaped by love, friendship and companionship. "Figure de style" is an ode to feminine beauty, drawing on imagery from art, literature, and rhetoric. Agence Congolaise de Presse noted that Ipupa uses idiomatic expressions, romantic hyperbole and metaphors in the chorus to convey the depth of his feelings. He likens the woman's beauty to Nefertiti and the Mona Lisa, arguing that the conventional phrase "I love you" cannot adequately capture her appearance and searching instead for more sophisticated ways to express his admiration. The song also references several French-language literary figures, including Victor Hugo, Charles Baudelaire, Jacques Prévert, Paul Éluard, Antoine de Saint-Exupéry, Paul Verlaine, Gustave Flaubert, and Charles Cros, as well as Congolese musician Simaro Lutumba.

"Honorable unique" reworks Madilu System's 2001 hit "Juste un peu d'amour decastro", while "Doc Jeff 3" reinterprets Tabu Ley Rochereau's 1981 hit "Maze". "Orgasy" revisits the song of the same name from Ipupa's 2006 debut solo album Droit Chemin. "Hommage" pays tribute to Vally Amisi, a Congolese entrepreneur and sports executive who served as vice president of Nouvelle Vie Bomoko FC and was based in South Africa.

=== Release and promotion ===
Promotion for material that ultimately formed Délirium began in late 2025. "Deux Êtres" was released on 9 December as the first track from the soundtrack of Rumba Royale, in which Ipupa also had a major acting role. The song preceded the film's 12 December premiere at the Institut Français de Kinshasa and was subsequently promoted in connection with XX. During a livestream on 10 February 2026, Ipupa previewed several tracks, including "Fidélité", "Euphorie", "Complices", "Victoire", "Prosternez-vous", "Palabres", "Un jour", "Solitaire", "Doudou", "Crime passionnel", "Honorable unique", and "Emmène-moi". "Sans Limite" followed on 27 February and was also presented as part of XX.

On 23 April, Mbote.cd reported that the album was scheduled for release on 10 June. A preliminary track listing published on 9 June comprised 51 tracks across four discs. On 10 June, Ipupa announced that the full release had been postponed to 18 September and made "Wanna Dance", "Complices" and "Kitamata" available on streaming platforms. Agence Congolaise de Presse (ACP) described the three tracks as previews released during the three-month postponement. Ahead of the album's release, Ipupa announced a limited Chevalier Edition, whose name referred to his elevation to the rank of Chevalier of the National Order of the Leopard in June 2026. XX: Délirium was released on 18 September 2026 and includes guest appearances by Gaz Mawete, Stanley Enow, Afrik'an Legend and DJ Kawest.

With 51 tracks, Délirium exceeded several other lengthy Congolese albums, including Koffi Olomidé's 13ème Apôtre (2015), with 39 tracks; Platinium, Vol. 2 (2024), with 34; Adolphe Dominguez's 12 (2024), with 32; and Ipupa's Formule 7 (2022) and Control (2018), with 32 and 31, respectively. It became the largest Congolese album by track count.

== Reception ==
=== XX ===
XX performed a strong commercial debut, debuting at No. 1 on France's SNEP Top Albums chart and making Ipupa the first African artist to top the chart for the week with 12,307 equivalent sales. It also charted in Belgium with moderate success, entering at No. 14 on Ultratop Wallonia and No. 152 on Ultratop Flanders for a week.

Critical reception was generally positive. Congolese music journalist Étienne Kambala of Strong2Kin Moov described the album as one that "impresses with its meticulous songwriting, controlled vocals, and dense sonic architecture". Music in Africa contributors Collins Matsepe, Mandla Mhlongwa, and Lucky Mqoboli praised XX as "sonically bold" and "brave" for its experimentation with Congolese musical forms. Mide Ajayi of Superbold Magazine described the album as "contemporary yet deeply rooted", highlighting its ability to bridge "generations, geographies, and musical worlds". Ajayi cited songs such as "Alifa" featuring DJ Maphorisa and Tresor, "Jam" featuring Wizkid, and the French-language, salsa-infused "Isoler" as examples of the album's cross-cultural appeal and its international outlook.

Kambala noted that this outward-facing direction does not overshadow its cultural foundations, citing "S'il était possible", which revisits Congolese rumba in a contemporary hybrid form. Ajayi similarly pointed out that Congolese rumba remains central, with Ipupa continuing to "modernize its guitar-led, emotionally rich foundations" by blending pop, R&B, and Afrobeats influences, which allows the album to "evolve without abandoning the cultural pulse".

=== XX : Délirium ===
Writing for Beto.cd, Odon Bakumba described XX: Délirium as a "musical autobiography", arguing that Ipupa revisited different periods of his solo career while updating their sound through contemporary arrangements. He accentuated the title track as one of the album's most accomplished compositions, alongside "Dynastie KO", "Alikey", "Minuit" and "Mo perso". Bakumba noted that its recurring rumba framework could create "an impression of uniformity" for listeners unfamiliar with the genre, but argued that variations in the arrangements, guitars, backing vocals and regional rhythms distinguished the songs. He noted that several songs run for five to eight minutes and demand sustained attention from listeners, arguing that their length is characteristic of Congolese rumba and allows lyrical narratives, guitar passages, backing vocals and dance sections to develop. Although he suggested that a shorter track list "would certainly have gained in accessibility", he maintained that reducing it might have undermined the project's purpose as a large-scale celebration of rumba and Ipupa's twenty-year solo career.

Goma Fleva described Délirium as "the second movement of a work conceived from the outset in several acts", contrasting its rumba-centered approach with the Afrobeats, pop and urban influences of the first XX installment. It characterized the album as a "musical archive of celebration", viewing its length as allowing it to function less as a singles-driven release than as a broad survey of Ipupa's musical style. The publication identified the five-hour duration as the project's "main challenge", noting the difficulty of listening to the album sequentially in the streaming era.

== XX track listing ==
XX track listing
No.	Title	Writer(s)	Producer(s)	Length
1.	"Cinéma"	Fally Ipupa Nsimba; Jnsy; Ugo Benterfa; Mukengerwa Tresor Riziki	Tresor	2:39
2.	"Pépélé" (featuring Guy2Bezbar)	Ipupa; Guy-Fernand Kapata; Jnsy	Joel Synthé; Armageddon; Layback; L.S.	2:31
3.	"Deuxième Maman"	Ipupa; LMB	Seysey; Le Marabout; LMB; Nate	2:51
4.	"Isoler"	Ipupa; Tresor; Jnsy	Rudolph Wilemse; Tresor; Batundi	2:58
5.	"Jam" (featuring Wizkid)	Ipupa; Ayodeji Ibrahim Balogun	Tresor; Batundi; Rudolph Wilemse	3:00
6.	"Petit coeur"	Ipupa; Brian Massamba; Jonah	Dany Synthé	2:49
7.	"Doucement" (featuring Joé Dwèt Filé)	Ipupa; Joé Gilles	Joé Dwèt Filé	3:47
8.	"Lost"	Ipupa; Massamba	Dany Synthé	2:47
9.	"Loin des yeux" (featuring Calema)	Ipupa; Calema	Seysey; Manacan	3:12
10.	"Just for you" (featuring Angélique Kidjo)	Ipupa; Angélique Kpasseloko Hinto Hounsinou Kandjo Manta Zogbin Kidjo; Jnsy; Ugo Benterfa	Lokua Kanza	3:52
11.	"Toi et moi" (featuring Keblack)	Ipupa; Cédric Matéta Nkomi	Julio Masidi; Christo K; Alex Shua	2:39
12.	"Lonely"	Ipupa; Jnsy; Ugo Benterfa	Tresor; Rudolph Wilemse; Batundi	3:08
13.	"Alifa" (featuring Tresor and DJ Maphorisa)	Ipupa; Tresor; Kahouly Nicolay Sereba; Vincent Dery	Tresor; Rudolph Wilemse; Batundi; DJ Maphorisa	3:58
14.	"With You"	Tresor; Jnsy; Ugo Benterfa	Tresor; Rudolph Wilemse; Batundi	2:57
15.	"Ma Diva" (featuring SDM)	Ipupa; Leonard Beni Mosabu; Espoir 2000; Jnsy; Ugo Benterfa	Dany Synthé	3:08
16.	"Eyes to Eyes"	Ipupa; LMB	Seysey; Le Marabout; LMB; Kan	2:53
17.	"S'il était possible"	Ipupa; Ugo Benterfa	Fally Ipupa; Alex Shua	5:18
18.	"Si tu t'en vas"	Ipupa; Jonathan Maman	Julio Masidi; Christo K	2:33
19.	"Bapaya" (featuring Lokua Kanza)	Ipupa; Pascal Lokua Kanza	Lokua Kanza	3:18
20.	"Adieux"	Ipupa; Nassim Arrami	Nyadjiko	3:20
Total length:				63:38

XX bonus track
No.	Title	Writer(s)	Producer(s)	Length
1.	"Goût danger"	Ipupa	Alex Shua; Fally Ipupa

== XX: Délirium track listing ==
XX: Délirium disc one
No.	Title	Writer(s)	Producer(s)	Length
1.	"Wanna Dance"	Fally Ipupa Nsimba	Ipupa; Alex Shua	6:05
2.	"Prosternez-vous"	Ipupa	Ipupa	5:48
3.	"Sectet de Bakalos"	Ipupa	Ipupa	5:48
4.	"Doudou"	Ipupa	Ipupa	5:31
5.	"Crime passionnel"	Ipupa	Ipupa	7:49
6.	"Amour cruel"	Ipupa	Ipupa	6:59
7.	"Den's Love"	Ipupa	Ipupa	7:30
8.	"Palabre"	Ipupa	Ipupa	6:34
9.	"Fidélité"	Ipupa	Ipupa	5:44
10.	"Cadence"	Ipupa	Ipupa	5;32
11.	"Résurrection"	Ipupa	Ipupa	7:02
12.	"Sans Illusion Ipupa"	Ipupa	Ipupa	6:13
Total length:				76:35

XX: Délirium disc two
No.	Title	Writer(s)	Producer(s)	Length
1.	"Dilirium"	Ipupa	Ipupa	5:07
2.	"Complices"	Ipupa	Ipupa	7:55
3.	"Euphorie"	Ipupa	Ipupa	6:49
4.	"Figure de style"	Ipupa	Ipupa	6:55
5.	"Raison de vivre"	Ipupa	Ipupa	6:26
6.	"Je n'aime que toi"	Ipupa	Ipupa	5:32
7.	"Ami, chéri"	Ipupa; Kenny Genevieve	Ipupa	4:02
8.	"Choix éternel"	Ipupa	Ipupa	6:19
9.	"Bonheur parfait"	Ipupa	Ipupa	5:56
10.	"Mo perso"	Ipupa	Ipupa	5:29
11.	"Solitaire"	Ipupa	Ipupa	6:41
12.	"Un jour"	Ipupa	Ipupa	5:41
13.	"Victoire"	Ipupa	Ipupa	5:29
Total length:				77:21

XX: Délirium disc three
No.	Title	Writer(s)	Producer(s)	Length
1.	"Reyna"	Ipupa	Ipupa	4:46
2.	"Partenaire"	Ipupa	Ipupa	5:45
3.	"Minuit"	Ipupa	Ipupa	8:12
4.	"Donald"	Ipupa	Ipupa	7:25
5.	"Binôme"	Ipupa	Ipupa	6:03
6.	"Emmène-moi"	Ipupa	Ipupa	5:14
7.	"Dynastie KO"	Ipupa	Ipupa	5:43
8.	"RDV"	Ipupa	Ipupa	6:09
9.	"Alikey"	Ipupa	Ipupa	6:20
10.	"Faya Benz"	Ipupa	Ipupa	5:26
11.	"Advienne que pourra"	Ipupa	Ipupa	7:14
12.	"Hommage"	Ipupa	Ipupa	6:34
13.	"Fourah"	Ipupa	Ipupa	5:46
Total length:				80:37

XX: Délirium disc four
No.	Title	Writer(s)	Producer(s)	Length
1.	"C'est comment"	Ipupa; Afrik'An Legend	Ipupa	5:49
2.	"Kitamata"	Ipupa; Joseph Kiambukuta Londa	Ipupa	9:04
3.	"Ché de Ché"	Ipupa	Ipupa	7:20
4.	"Orgasy"	Ipupa	Ipupa	9:57
5.	"Miss Lolo"	Ipupa	Ipupa	5:07
6.	"Doc Jeff 3"	Ipupa	Ipupa	6:54
7.	"Honorable unique"	Ipupa	Ipupa	6:08
8.	"Sidboy"	Ipupa; Stanley Ebai Enow; Gael Kapia Mawete	Ipupa	4:48
9.	"Jul, Kat"	Ipupa	Ipupa	5:58
10.	"Miguel Tshis"	Ipupa	Ipupa	5:51
11.	"JS"	Ipupa	Ipupa	5:42
12.	"Sans Limite"	Ipupa	Ipupa	6:27
13.	"Deux êtres"	Ipupa	Ipupa	5:13
Total length:				84:18

== Charts ==
Chart performance for XX
Chart (2026)	Peak position
Belgian Albums (Ultratop Flanders)	152
Belgian Albums (Ultratop Wallonia)	14
French Albums (SNEP)	1

== Personnel ==
=== XX ===
Credits adapted from the album's back cover:

- Fally Ipupa – songwriter, lead and backing vocalist, producer
- Guy2Bezbar – featured vocals
- Wizkid – featured vocals
- Joé Dwèt Filé – featured vocals, producer
- Calema – featured vocals
- Angélique Kidjo – featured vocals
- KeBlack– featured vocals
- DJ Maphorisa – featured vocals, producer
- Tresor – featured vocals, producer
- SDM – featured vocals
- Lokua Kanza – featured vocals, producer
- Armageddon – producer
- Joel Synthé – producer
- Layback – producer
- LS – producer
- Le Marabout – producer
- Nate – producer
- Seysey – producer
- LMB – producer
- Batundi – producer
- Rudolph Wilemse – producer
- Dany Synthé – producer
- Manacan – producer
- Alex Shua – producer
- Christo K – producer
- Julio Masidi – producer
- Kan – producer
- Raphael Nyadjiko – producer

=== XX: Délirium ===
- Fally Ipupa – lead vocals, backing vocals, songwriting, composition, production
- Alban Ancel-Pirouelle – recording engineer, mixing engineer
- Alex Gopher – mastering engineer
- DJ Kawest – featured vocals
- Afrik'an Legend – featured vocals
- Stanley Enow – featured vocals
- Gaz Mawete – featured vocals

== Release history ==
=== XX ===
Region	Date	Version	Format	Label	Ref
Various	17 April 2026	Standard	CD; digital download; streaming	Elektra France and Warner Music France	

=== XX: Délirium ===
Region	Date	Version	Format	Label	Ref
Various	18 September 2026	Standard	CD; digital download; streaming	Elektra France and Warner Music France	
