= Control (Fally Ipupa album) =

Studio album by Fally Ipupa
- Released: 2 November 2018
- Recorded: 2016–2018
- Studios: Tokooos Studio and Studio Ndiaye (Kinshasa); studios in Paris
- Genres: Congolese rumba; ndombolo
- Length: 3:30:42
- Labels: F'Victeam; Elektra France; Warner Music France
- Producer: Fally Ipupa

Fally Ipupa chronology
Tokooos (2017)	Control (2018)	Tokooos II (2020)

Control is the fifth studio album by Congolese singer-songwriter Fally Ipupa. It was released on 2 November 2018 through F'Victeam, under exclusive license to Elektra France and Warner Music France. A triple album containing 31 tracks, it was Ipupa's first predominantly Congolese rumba studio album since Power "Kosa Leka" (2013). Musically, Control incorporates Congolese rumba and ndombolo, marking a return to the styles associated with his earlier career following the more internationally oriented sound of Tokooos (2017).

Unlike Tokooos, Control contains no guest appearances. Contemporary coverage characterized the album as a return to Ipupa's Congolese audience and rumba roots; Univers Rumba Congolaise described it as a "100% rumba" return to his origins, while CongoleseMusic.com viewed it as reconciling the pop direction of his recent work with his background in Congolese rumba. The album was preceded by the singles "École", "Canne à sucre", and "Aime-moi". Control peaked at No. 74 in France and No. 58 in Wallonia and was certified quadruple diamond by Africa Music & Charts.

== Background ==
Ipupa released his fourth studio album, Tokooos, in July 2017. Rather than focusing mainly on Congolese rumba, the album mixed R&B and hip-hop with Congolese music and featured several international and Francophone collaborators. The project was partly intended to reach audiences beyond the Democratic Republic of the Congo and the established audience for Congolese rumba. Its urban-oriented sound drew criticism from some listeners who preferred the rumba and ndombolo styles associated with Ipupa's earlier work.

Ipupa followed Tokooos with Control, which took a different direction by placing Congolese rumba at the center of the project and marked his first predominantly rumba studio album since Power "Kosa Leka" (2013). CongoleseMusic.com described Control as an effort to reconcile Ipupa's increasingly pop-oriented direction with his Congolese rumba background, while Univers Rumba Congolaise characterized it as a return to his musical roots.

== Recording, production and style ==
Work on Control began while Ipupa was also developing Tokooos, with recording reportedly dating to late 2016. Most of the album was recorded at Ipupa's Tokooos Studio and Studio Ndiaye in Kinshasa, with additional work finalized in Paris. Ipupa wrote, produced, and performed vocals throughout the album.

The production followed the conventions of Congolese rumba, with prominent guitars, bass, keyboards, percussion, and atalaku vocals. The sessions featured members of Ipupa's F'Victeam band, who also contributed backing vocals and vocal animation, alongside additional musicians. Alex Shua handled engineering and programming, with additional programming by Olivier Kiungu.

Control is principally a Congolese rumba album that incorporates ndombolo and extended sebene passages. Many of the album's songs use the extended format common in Congolese rumba, with several exceeding seven minutes and some running for more than eight minutes. The lyrics mainly focus on love and relationships, with songs addressing romantic devotion, separation, jealousy, infidelity, emotional abandonment, and failing relationships. Control also makes extensive use of libanga, a Congolese musical practice in which individuals are named or praised within songs. The title track, "Control", is a ndombolo-based générique. In Congolese popular music, génériques are dance-oriented compositions commonly used to showcase an artist or band. Unlike many such tracks, "Control" places less emphasis on atalaku vocals, with Ipupa taking a prominent vocal role.

== Singles and lyrics ==
Ipupa released Control's opening track, "École", on 25 July 2018. Booska-P described the ndombolo track as signaling Ipupa's return to a more traditional Congolese sound. The song uses mabanga, with Ipupa name-checking several footballers and other athletes. The accompanying music video, directed by Papy Mukalay Ngoy and JP Kyss, was filmed at Ipupa's rehearsal space in Kinshasa and features members of F'Victeam. Booska-P interpreted a graffiti portrait of Ipupa featured in the video as a reference to his popularity. "École" also introduced Ipupa's dances patinage, or danse ya ba moto, which gained attention on social media and was performed by several public figures, including footballers Didier Drogba, Samuel Eto'o and Salomon Kalou, rapper Youssoupha, singer A'Salfo and politician Hamed Bakayoko.

Less than a month after the release of "École", Ipupa announced "Canne à sucre" on 23 August for release on 31 August. "Canne à sucre" is a Congolese rumba song in which Ipupa praises a woman. Its arrangement is built around a repeating chord progression layered with multiple melodic instruments, with a transition around the two-minute mark introducing the song's main melodic section. The title translates as "Sugar Cane", which CongoleseMusic.com interpreted as a metaphor for the sweetness of the woman addressed in the lyrics. It appeared on the French iTunes Top Songs chart. Music In Africa Foundation also named it among its "Top 5 Best Rumba Songs".

"Aime-moi" ("Love Me") was released on 26 October 2018, one week before Control. The Congolese rumba song makes extensive use of libanga and is dedicated to businessman and former National Assembly member Alita Tshamala, also known as Papa Social. Ipupa sings from the perspective of a woman in love with Tshamala. The lyrics initially describe the suffering caused by this love and a willingness to endure it before shifting to direct appeals for love, marriage, and affection.

Several other songs were released with Control, including the ndombolo-infused "The Crown", which was among the first album tracks promoted with a video following the album's release. The video features Ipupa and F'Victeam in choreographed group dance sequences. The Congolese rumba "Doc Jeff" is dedicated to businessman and cultural patron Jeff Ndjadi Leteta and is performed from the perspective of a woman in love with Ndjadi. The lyrics address romantic devotion, outside interference in the relationship, and the pain of rejection. "Control", the album's title track, is an ndombolo-influenced générique featuring Ipupa and F'Victeam. The song uses self-affirming and competitive references, including allusions to rivals within the music industry, and its music video is largely centered on dance choreography. The romantic rumba track "Code d'amour" is addressed to a woman named Eliane, with lyrics centered on lasting devotion and imagining the couple remaining together into old age. The song also features individually composed passages by supporting singers, which reflect a practice in Congolese ensemble music in which members of a singer's group contribute their own sections within the lead artist's composition. "Maria PM" is a love song dedicated to Maria Ngalula Piron, popularly known as Maria Mandala, the wife of Congolese businessman Éric Mandala Kinzenga. The couple married civilly in Gombe, Kinshasa, on 26 July 2017. In the song, Ipupa takes the perspective of Maria's husband and asks her not to leave, recalling promises from their relationship while expressing his devotion and admiration for her.

"Punition" ("Punishment") centers on emotional neglect within a relationship. The lyrics describe suffering caused by unreciprocated affection and plead for the partner to change his behavior. The song also incorporates libanga, naming Brice Dimitri Bayendissa with the honorific "Honorable". "La Guerre" ("The War") explores jealousy and infidelity, portraying a woman who, despite knowing of her partner's relationships with other women, chooses to fight for their relationship rather than leave him. The song's "war" metaphor presents her struggle against other women for her partner's affection. "Photo" centers on the possible end of a romantic relationship, with Ipupa singing from the perspective of a woman who, faced with rejection, asks to keep a final photograph of her partner. "Humanisme" centers on an attempt to win back a former lover. CongoleseMusic.com praised the interplay between Ipupa's vocals and the instrumentation, describing it as one of the album's strongest compositions.

"Sans amour" ("Without Love") is about romantic abandonment. Ipupa sings from the perspective of a woman recalling a relationship that began playfully before becoming serious. After her lover, Théophile, leaves, she describes herself as being left "without love". The song also incorporates libanga through references to Théophile. "Mbongwana" ("Change" in Lingala) centers on a once-intimate relationship that has deteriorated into indifference. Ipupa sings from the perspective of a woman questioning her partner's change in behavior and the growing influence of other women over him.

"A Flyé" is dedicated to cultural patron Adolphe Muteba Tshilamwina and centers on a woman pleading with her partner not to leave, only for him to eventually walk away. The title, which translates literally as "flew away", serves as a metaphor for the partner's departure. The lyrics address the pain and confusion caused by his change in behavior and contrast material wealth with affection, presenting love as more valuable than material possessions. Congolese media also discussed "A Flyé" in the context of Ipupa's rivalry with fellow rumba singer Ferré Gola, with some coverage presenting the track as a response to Gola's successful 2017 rumba single "Jugement". Ipupa dedicated "Bafana" to his wife, Nana Ketchup Bafana. The song draws on biblical references to Delilah, the Queen of Sheba, and Mary Magdalene, linking them to Samson, Solomon, and Jesus, respectively. "Jus d'orange" is again dedicated to Ndjadi and is sung from the viewpoint of a woman expressing an intense desire to be with him. "Roi Manitou" pays tribute to Ludovic Byart, a Congolese entrepreneur who founded the South African wine house Roi Manitou Wines. The company also produces wines bearing Byart's name, while the lyrics refer to the song's addressee as both "Ludovic Byart" and "Roi Manitou". Ipupa sings from the perspective of a woman whose lover has become distant and indifferent, pleading for his attention and expressing distress over the deteriorating relationship. "One Love" is performed primarily in French, a characteristic that Mbote.cd compared to Tokooos. The lyrics center on a man who regards a woman named Olovia as his one true love. Booska-P suggested that the woman referenced in the song was Olivia Song, the wife of Cameroonian footballer Alexandre Song.

== Release and promotion ==
On 25 July 2018, Ipupa released "École" as the first preview of Control, followed by "Canne à sucre" on 31 August. On 4 October, he announced on social media that the album would be released on 2 November, and it became available for pre-order on 12 October. By then, several other album tracks, including "Humanisme", "Bombe", "207", "Souci", and "One Love", had already been heard publicly. "Aime-moi" was released on 26 October, one week before Control was released on 2 November 2018.

Control was released by F'Victeam under exclusive license to Elektra France and Warner Music France. The album was released digitally and as a three-CD set. The first two discs each contain eleven songs, while the third contains nine. Unlike Tokooos, Control contains no guest appearances, although Music in Africa Foundation reported that collaborations with Sean Paul and Koffi Olomidé had been considered. On 22 November 2018, Ipupa appeared on Radio France Internationale's Couleurs Tropicales, hosted by Claudy Siar, to promote Control. In April 2019, he announced a summer world tour with dates planned in the United States, Zambia, South Africa, the Republic of the Congo, the DRC, Canada, and Australia.

== Reception ==
Control peaked at No. 74 on the French albums chart and No. 58 on the Walloon albums chart. CongoleseMusic.com also reported that the album reached No. 10 on the French iTunes albums chart. By June 2021, Control had surpassed 20 million streams on Spotify.

Contemporary coverage of Control frequently emphasized Ipupa's return to Congolese rumba. Univers Rumba Congolaise described the record as a "100% Rumba" return to Ipupa's roots and identified "Aime-moi", "École", and "Canne à sucre" among the tracks attracting particular attention. CongoleseMusic.com similarly viewed the album as an attempt to reconcile the pop direction of Ipupa's recent work with his background in Congolese rumba. The publication praised the interplay between Ipupa's vocals and the instrumentation on "Humanisme", describing it as one of the album's strongest compositions. Writing retrospectively in 2021, Strong2Kin Moov described Control as Ipupa's return to rumba following criticism of the urban-oriented sound of Tokooos.

== Track listing ==
Disc one
No.	Title	Writer(s)	Producer(s)	Length
1.	"Control"	Fally Ipupa Nsimba	Ipupa; F'Victeam	4:00
2.	"Canne à sucre"	Ipupa	Felly Dimbedi Mumba; Ipupa	8:29
3.	"Aime-moi"	Ipupa	Ipupa	6:05
4.	"Code d'amour"	Ipupa	Ipupa	7:15
5.	"Maria PM"	Ipupa	Ipupa	6:18
6.	"Punition"	Ipupa	Ipupa	7:22
7.	"La guerre"	Ipupa	Ipupa	6:58
8.	"Photo"	Ipupa	Ipupa	7:19
9.	"Humanisme"	Ipupa	Ipupa	6:56
10.	"Sans amour"	Ipupa	Ipupa	8:13
11.	"Mbongwana"	Ipupa	Ipupa	6:24
Total length:				75:19

Disc two
No.	Title	Writer(s)	Producer	Length
1.	"The Crown"	Ipupa	Ipupa	8:16
2.	"Bafana"	Ipupa	Ipupa	7:42
3.	"Jus d'orange"	Ipupa	Ipupa	6:54
4.	"A Flyé"	Ipupa	Ipupa	6:29
5.	"S. Mushigo"	Ipupa	Ipupa	6:31
6.	"Bombe"	Ipupa	Ipupa	7:51
7.	"Roi Manitou"	Ipupa	Ipupa	7:37
8.	"Ndaye Late Dior"	Ipupa	Ipupa	6:24
9.	"DG Landry"	Ipupa	Ipupa	6:18
10.	"Vouloir sans pouvoir"	Ipupa	Ipupa	5:34
11.	"207"	Ipupa	Ipupa	6:03
Total length:				75:39

Disc three
No.	Title	Writer(s)	Producer	Length
1.	"École"	Ipupa	Ipupa	8:39
2.	"Sans pitié"	Ipupa	Ipupa	5:26
3.	"Soucis"	Ipupa	Ipupa	8:12
4.	"One Love"	Ipupa	Ipupa	6:20
5.	"Bafana Love"	Ipupa	Ipupa	7:08
6.	"Doc Jeff"	Ipupa	Ipupa	7:38
7.	"C'est bon"	Ipupa	Ipupa	4:40
8.	"World"	Ipupa	Ipupa	8:01
9.	"You The Best"	Ipupa	Ipupa	3:40
Total length:				59:44

== Personnel ==
Credits adapted from the album's digital credits and accompanying release information.

=== Musicians ===
- Fally Ipupa – lead vocals, backing vocals, composition, songwriting, production
- Wallo Liyeye – bass guitar
- Felly Tyson – guitar
- Jobey Nsimba – guitar
- Serge Liaki – guitar
- Willy Zola – guitar
- Alex Shua – keyboards, programming, engineering
- Billy Muyoyo – keyboards
- Christian Ngongi – percussion
- Lunguilla Showman – percussion
- Mata Suangolo – percussion
- F'Victeam – backing vocals, animation

=== Technical ===
- Fally Ipupa – producer
- Alex Shua – engineering, programming
- Olivier Kiungu – programming
- Alias – mixing
- JP Kiss – mixing, recording, mastering
- Djino Liaki – assistant

=== Additional personnel ===
- Madina Djobounge – management
- Landry Photo – art direction
- Manon Loubaki – public relations

== Charts ==
Chart (2018)	Peak position
Belgian Albums (Ultratop Wallonia)	58
French Albums (SNEP)	74

== Certifications ==
Region	Certification	Certified units/sales
Africa (Africa Music & Charts)	4× Diamond	200,000‡ (Note: The 200,000 figure represents the minimum album-equivalent units required for a four-times Diamond certification by Africa Music & Charts, rather than independently reported physical album sales.)

== Release history ==
Region	Date	Format	Label	Ref
Various	2 November 2018	CD; vinyl; digital download; streaming	F'Victeam; Elektra France; Warner Music France	
