= Gaz Mawete =

Congolese singer (born 1991)

- Also known as: Boyika Machine; Samson Petit Coeur; Tueur de Dragon; 207 Esprit; Agara Binana; Muana Tshangu
- Born: Gael Kapia Mawete; 30 September 1991 (age 34); Masina, Kinshasa, Zaire (modern-day Democratic Republic of the Congo)
- Genres: Ndombolo; Congolese rumba; R&B; soul; hip-hop; traditional folklore
- Occupations: Singer-songwriter; dancer; bandleader; record producer; record executive; television personality
- Instrument: Vocals
- Years active: 2011–present
- Labels: AJOCS PRO; Bomayé Musik; BNB Records

Gael Kapia Mawete (born 30 September 1991), known professionally as Gaz Mawete, is a Congolese singer-songwriter, dancer, record producer, record executive, actor, television personality, and bandleader. He is the founder and CEO of the record label BNB Records, which also operates as his backing band. Regarded as a central figure in contemporary Congolese urban music, he is often referred to as "Boyika Machine". His music is a synthesis of R&B, Congolese rumba, soul, ndombolo, and traditional folklore.

Born in Masina, Kinshasa, Mawete first gained public attention in 2011 as a contestant on Vodacom Congo's Super Hook-Up TV, where his talent was discovered. After a series of early singles, he rose to prominence in Kinshasa through the critically and commercially successful singles "Etali Nga Te" (2015) and "Mukolo Ya Zoba" (2016), which were later featured on his seven-track EP Bombanda, released in July 2017, and supported by the singles "Pika", "Lisolo", "Na Belaka", "Toko Tik'o Te", and "Bombanda". In November 2017, he won the Vodacom Best of the Best All Star contest with his standout performance of "Pika", leading to a contract with the French-Congolese label Bomayé Musik. In December 2017, he released the ndombolo-infused single "Paulina", which received him a nomination for Best Male Artist in Central Africa at the All Africa Music Awards. His breakthrough came with the 2018 Congolese rumba hit "Olingi Nini".

In December 2019, Mawete released his six-track EP Tsunga Avant L'Album, which was supported by "Game Over", as well as "Zuwa", "Je suis choqué", "Milinga Likolo", "Nako", and "Kibokolo". In February 2020, Mawete premiered "C'est Raté", featuring Fally Ipupa, which won Video of the Year at the African Muzik Magazine Awards. That year, he also secured nominations for Best African Act at the MTV Europe Music Awards and Best Francophone Act at the MTV Africa Music Awards. In 2022, Mawete released his debut studio album, Puzzle, which yielded his highest commercial success with its breakout single, "500", featuring Chily, topping Boomplay's annual Top Male Songs chart in the DRC. After his contract with Bomayé Musik expired that same year, he established BNB Records and released his second album, Gaz Mawete, in August 2024. In July 2025, Mawete was ranked ninth on Billboard France's chart of the most-streamed Congolese artists in France, limited to those who began their careers in either the DRC or the Republic of the Congo. He later released the mixtape PROTOTYPE INDUSA PARTI 1 in December.

== Early life and career ==
=== 1991–2018: Childhood, Bombanda, Vodacom Best of the Best All Star, and "Paulina" ===
Gael Kapia Mawete was born on 30 September 1991, in Masina, Kinshasa, formerly part of Zaire, now known as the Democratic Republic of the Congo. Raised in a household of seven children, two sisters and five brothers, he is the youngest among them. In an interview with the digital cultural platform Talents2Kin, Mawete disclosed that his musical upbringing was heavily influenced by a variety of Congolese artists, with Werrason being his most significant inspiration.

In 2011, Mawete gained his first exposure by participating in Vodacom Congo's Super Hook-Up TV Season 2. He then made his official debut in 2013 with the single "Tupendana", followed by "Chérie à Dit" and "Lisolo" in 2014. Despite their lukewarm commercial reception, Mawete gained considerable traction with "Etali Nga Te" in 2015 and "Mukolo Ya Zoba" in 2016, tracks that propelled him to prominence in Kinshasa's music scene. In 2016, he auditioned for the Voice Afrique Francophone, though he was eliminated after the blind auditions.

On 27 July 2017, Mawete released his seven-track Extended Play (EP) titled Bombanda, which included his previously released singles "Lisolo", "Etali Nga Te", and "Mukolo Ya Zoba". The EP was supported by the hit "Pika". Produced by AJOCS PRO, it featured guest appearances from Mbidika, Bill Clinton Kalonji, and DJ Samarinho. In September 2017, Mawete joined the Vodacom Best of the Best All Star contest, co-hosted by Vodacom and Pygma, offering a $75,000 prize, which included $20,000 in cash, $55,000 allocated for album production, and a deal with Bomayé Musik, co-founded by Général Philo and Youssoupha. He took first place in November 2017 with his standout performance of "Pika", surpassing twelve other finalists, including Voldie Mapenzi, Lionel Ekongo, Jamaica, Christian Muyoli and T2B.

On 22 December 2017, he released the ndombolo-infused single "Paulina", written by Bionic "Docta Bio" Diwabanza. Accompanied by a self-directed music video released in February 2018 under Bomayé Musik by Mukongo Business, the song narrates the story of a boy enamored with his partner, who splurges excessively on her, only to feel betrayed after seeing her with another man, ultimately deciding to overcome the heartbreak and move forward. The song reached number six on Music in Africa's annual "Top 10 hits that got people dancing" and earned Mawete a nomination for Best Male Artist in Central Africa at the All Africa Music Awards. However, on 11 May 2018, the Ministry of Justice, through the National Commission for the Censorship of Songs and Performances (CNCCS), imposed a nationwide ban on "Paulina", citing the absence of requisite prior authorization. The edict prohibited its broadcast across all media platforms, including television, radio, and nightclubs, while imposing punitive fines ranging from CDF 50,000 to CDF 5,000,000 under a 1996 statute aimed at curbing "racial or tribal hatred" and maintain public order.

=== 2018–2021: Standalone releases, Tsunga Avant L'Album, collaborations ===
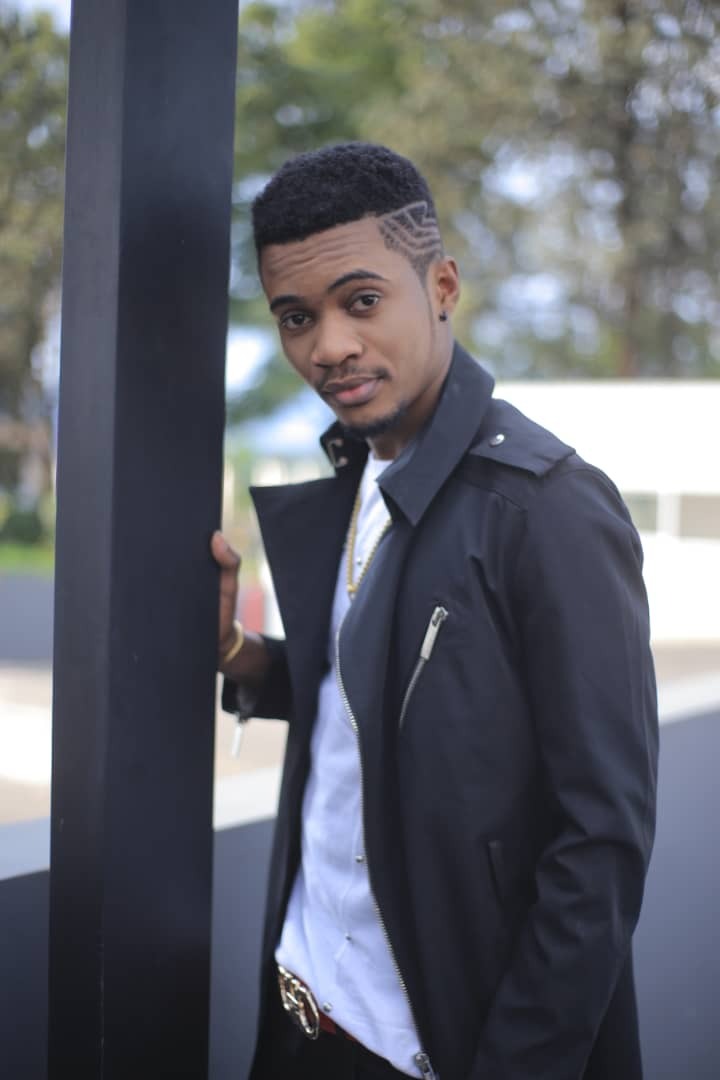
Gaz Mawete in 2019

Mawete released the Congolese rumba-inspired single "Olingi Nini" on 10 August, which became a major hit, amassing over one million YouTube views within two months. The accompanying music video was directed by Meddy Saleh for Press It Films. "Olingi Nini" gained widespread acclaim across the nation and garnered moderate popularity in other African countries, receiving recognition from fellow Congolese musicians such as Koffi Olomide, Fally Ipupa, Fabregas Le Métis Noir, Celéo Scram, and Héritier Watanabe, as well as from France-based diaspora artists like Youssoupha, Dadju, and Fababy. Mawete support "Olingi Nini" at the Bomayé Musik concert held on 26 August at the Athénée de la Gombe in Kinshasa, where he performed alongside fellow labelmates Keblack, Naza, Jaymax, Hiro, Youssoupha, and DJ Mist.

Mawete dropped the single "Antidote (Ko Boya Nga Te)" on 8 March 2019, composed by Shedy Beat, with the music video directed by Meddy Saleh and produced under Bomayé Musik by Mukongo Business. The song tells the story of a reformed philanderer who reforms his behavior after meeting a woman, only to be wrongfully dumped by her for a misdeed he didn't commit but was assumed to have intended. He then performed at the Neema Festival, held on 17 May at Spazio Novecento in Rome and 18 May at Magazzini Generali in Milan. The next day, he performed at the Congo Na Paris festival, celebrating the Congolese diaspora. While in France, Mawete collaborated with KeBlack and Naza on a new track and made media appearances to promote "Antidote (Ko Boya Nga Te)". On 1 July, he released the single "La Loi du Talion" and later performed in Brussels, Cologne, and Paris, where Naza invited him to open for his concert at the Zénith de Paris on 30 October. In September, Mawete also participated in the African Music Forum, performing alongside Youssoupha, the headline act for the annual event that brings together artists and music professionals in Kinshasa.

Mawete commenced work on his EP Tsunga Avant L'Album in November 2019 and introduced its lead Congolese rumba-inspired single, "Game Over", that same month through his Instagram page, with the release scheduled for 2 December. Tsunga Avant L'Album was officially published by Général Philo under Bomayé Musik on 13 December and included six tracks, including "Game Over", as well as "Zuwa", "Je suis choqué", "Milinga Likolo", "Nako", and "Kibokolo". Within three days of its debut, the EP entered Deezer's top 300 charts on all genres, peaking at 23rd in Russia, 25th in Norway, 32nd in Canada, among other countries, while surpassing one million streams on digital music platforms within a month.

On 19 December, Mawete guest-featured on Dadju's song "Mwasi ya Congo", a tribute to Congolese women affected by sexual violence, with all proceeds allocated to the GiveBackCharity initiative. He was featured in Djany's song "Bima" on 24 January 2020 and Jojo Le Barbu's "Tous ça c'est Dieu" on 3 February. On 21 February 2020, Mawete unveiled "C'est Raté", featuring Fally Ipupa, and joined Fally's performance at the Accor Arena on 28 February. "C'est Raté" received widespread recognition, garnered over two million views on YouTube within four months, and clinched Video of the Year at the African Muzik Magazine Awards. That same year, Mawete earned nominations for Best African Act at the MTV Europe Music Awards and Best Francophone Act at the MTV Africa Music Awards. On 29 January 2021, Mawete released "Bonioma", composed by Shedy Beat, with an accompanying music video directed by Homa Homa. He followed up with "Maitresse" on 7 May, another Shedy Beat-composed single, accompanied by a self-directed music video.

=== 2021–2024: Puzzle, performances, collaborations, and Gaz Mawete ===
In early 2021, Mawete began working on his debut studio album, Puzzle, and in April announced a collaboration with Ivorian rapper Suspect 95 for the project. While recording the album, he guest-performed on Isis Kingue's single "Ndolo" on 18 June and later collaborated with French rapper Vegedream on "Tika", which was released on 22 October. He also made a guest appearance on fellow Congolese singer Mélissa Yansané's single "Bâton Magique" on 10 August. In November 2021, Mawete confirmed that Puzzle would premiere in January 2022, releasing its single "Nani" on 21 January. The song amassed over one million views on YouTube within two weeks. The album's official release was later deferred to 4 March 2022. Puzzle consists of 15 tracks, including "Tika" and "Nani", with guest appearances from Keblack, Driks, Suspect 95, Chily, and Vegedream. The video for "500", a ndombolo-infused track featuring Chily, reached one million YouTube views in a week. Within five months, Puzzle amassed over 10 million streams across digital platforms, peaked atop Boomplay's annual Top Male Songs chart in the DRC, and gained significant traction on TikTok. To promote Puzzle, Mawete performed at Kin Plaza Arjaan by Rotana Hotels in Gombe, Kinshasa, on 8 March. He then participated in the Lukin Connexion Lubumbashi-Kinshasa concert on 9 April at the Prestige Lounge Bar in Lubumbashi, followed by a performance at La Maroquinerie in Paris on 5 June as part of Puzzle Tour 1. The tour included stops in France, Belgium, Germany, Norway, the Democratic Republic of the Congo, Northern Cyprus, Ireland, Turkey, the Republic of the Congo, and England.

On 17 November, Mawete announced via Twitter that he would no longer be working with Bomayé Musik. He then established his backing band BNB, which doubled as his independent record label, also named BNB Records. Shortly thereafter, he appeared as a guest artist on "Eloko", a collaboration with Robinio Mundibu on an amapiano and ndombolo-inspired track released on 5 May 2023. Two weeks later, on 19 May, he dropped "Dendisa" featuring French rapper Niska under BNB Records. Within two weeks, the track amassed one million YouTube views and 429,749 Spotify streams. On 12 July, he received a nomination for Best Central African Artist of the Year at the Headies. Two days later, on 14 July, he joined fellow Congolese singer Singuila on the track "Linga Nga", whose video surpassed one million views on YouTube within two weeks and earned over 119K streams on Spotify. On 11 August, he collaborated with Christian Bella on the remix of "Nishike", followed by an appearance on Fellow's track "Na Lola" on 3 September. On 4 November, he performed at the second anniversary of Aqua Splash in Limete, Kinshasa. The following month, on December 1, he appeared on Rena's track "Kumba Nga".

Mawete's second studio album, Gaz Mawete, was initially conceived as an EP and introduced its first single, "Effacer", on 19 January 2024, followed by the ndombolo and amapiano-inspired "Fondili" on 3 May, with its video debuting on 19 May. On 5 June, Mawete revealed the EP's seven-song tracklist, featuring collaborations with Guy2Bezbar on "Truc en commun" and Ya Levis Dalwear on "K.O". Officially launched on 14 June, the EP soared to the top of Apple Music charts in both Congos within 24 hours. On 23 August, Mawete expanded the EP into a full-length album by adding three tracks, including "Basana", "Sabrina", and "Événement", bringing the total to ten. He promoted the album with a sold-out concert at La Cigale with BNB and guest artists Fally Ipupa, Franglish, Singuila, Niska, Ya Levis Dalwear, Tidiane Mario, Marcosins Ipupa, and Chily. He later took the stage at the Mother Africa Festival, held in Abidjan, Ivory Coast, on 27–28 December.

=== 2025–present: Solidarité Congo, performances and PROTOTYPE INDUSA PARTI 1 ===
On 22 April 2025, Mawete took the stage at the sold-out Solidarité Congo benefit concert at the Accor Arena. This charity event brought together 30 notable artists from the French rap industry, as well as internationally known and Congolese musicians, to raise funds for children affected by the Rwandan-backed M23 insurgency in eastern DRC, with the proceeds directed towards Dadju's Give Back Charity. Initially scheduled for 7 April, the event was postponed in observance of the International Day of Remembrance of the 1994 Rwandan genocide. On 30 August, Mawete later appeared at Stade Cardinal Malula, where the concert was interrupted after guest rapper Suintement struck a fan who had approached him on stage. The incident rapidly spread across social media and drew strong criticism, while neither the organizers nor Mawete issued an official statement. On 18 October, he featured in the music video for "Jamaïque" by fellow Congolese musician Zakalara, before releasing his single "Tous les soirs" ("every night") on 31 October, which generated strong reactions due to a provocative lyric widely interpreted as a reference to Innoss'B's separation from Rebo Tchulo.

On 24 December, Mawete released the first part of his mixtape PROTOTYPE INDUSA PARTI 1, which contained twelve tracks selected from a larger 25-song project. The mixtape featured guest artists from Youssoupha, Yhello Yizi, Jr Bougary Tamaro, and Joe Gez, and fused Congolese rumba with hip-hop and ndombolo influences.

== Television and film career ==
=== Early television appearances and talent competitions ===
Mawete's involvement in television began in 2011 when he participated in the second season of Vodacom Superstar, the Congolese adaptation of the Pop Idol franchise. The show, hosted by Jacky Ndala and sponsored by the Akonik label, affiliated with Senegalese-American artist Akon, marked his first national exposure. In 2016, he auditioned for the Voice Afrique Francophone, though he was eliminated during the blind auditions. In September 2017, Mawete entered Vodacom Best of the Best (All Star), a music competition co-organized by Vodacom Congo and Pygma, which offered a $75,000 prize package—including $20,000 in cash, $55,000 towards album production, and a recording contract with Bomayé Musik, co-founded by Général Philo and rapper Youssoupha. In November of that year, he was declared the winner following his performance of the single "Pika", outperforming twelve other finalists. In June 2025, he joined the judging panel of Nouvelle Reine, a pan-African beauty pageant airing on Canal+, taking part in the DRC casting sessions alongside Singuila, Senegalese fashion designer Adama Paris, and Ivorian model Awa Sanoko.

=== Acting debut in Sur le Canapé, short film works, and INDUSA ===
Mawete made his acting debut in 2020 with Sur le Canapé, a Kinshasa-based television series produced by Tosala Films and directed by Emmanuel Lupia. The series, co-starring Congolese actress and comedian Daniela Bongongo, portrayed Mawete as a young husband in a domestic comedy setting. Sponsored by Vodacom Congo and broadcast on B-One Television, the show premiered on 22 October 2020 at the Sultani Hotel and quickly gained popularity, being described as a "cinematic favorite" among Congolese audiences.

That same year, Mawete explored visual storytelling through music with the short film accompanying his single "Zuwa", from the EP Tsunga Avant L'Album. Produced by Bomayé Musik, the eight-minute video was noted for its narrative depth and philosophical undertones, drawing inspiration from the writings of Joseph Michel Antoine Servan. Also in 2020, he appeared in the film La Casa Du Millionnaire: Suite et Fin, produced by Kinshasa's Millionnaire Club.

In March 2025, Mawete expanded his presence in film by announcing his own television series titled INDUSA. A preview screening of the series was scheduled for 8 March at Showbuzz, a performing arts venue in Kinshasa.

== Awards and nominations ==
Year	Event	Prize	Recipient	Result	Ref.
2018	All Africa Music Awards	Best Male Artist in Central Africa	Himself	Nominated	
2019	African Muzik Magazine Awards	Best Newcomer	Himself	Nominated	
2019	African Talent Awards	Best Africa New Artist	Himself	Nominated	
2020	African Muzik Magazine Awards	Video of the Year	"C'est Rate" (with Fally Ipupa)	Won	
2020	MTV Europe Music Awards	Best African Act	Himself	Nominated	
2020	MTV Africa Music Awards	Best Francophone Act	Himself	Nominated	
2023	The Headies	Best Central African Artist of the Year	Himself	Nominated	
2023	Jaydi Awards	Best Artist of Central Africa	Himself	Nominated	
2023	Kora Awards	Best Male Artist of the Year	Himself	Nominated	
2025	Trace Awards & Festival	Best Artist Francophone Africa	Himself	Nominated	

== Discography ==
=== Albums ===
- Puzzle (2022)
- Gaz Mawete (2024)

=== Extended Play (EP) ===
- Bombanda (2017)
- Tsunga avant l'album (2019)

=== Mixtapes ===
- PROTOTYPE INDUSA PARTI 1 (2025)

=== Singles ===
Year	Songs
2013	"Tupendana"
2014	"Cheri a dit"
2017	"Paulina"
2017	"Faux petit"
2017	"Ngebe"
2018	"Olingi Nini"
2018	"Antidote"
2019	"La Loi du Talion"
2020	"C'est Raté" feat Fally Ipupa
