= Olingi Nini =

2018 song by Gaz Mawete

Single by Gaz Mawete
- Released: August 10, 2018
- Recorded: 2017
- Genre: Congolese rumba; hip-hop
- Length: 3:46
- Label: AJOCS PRO
- Songwriter(s): Gaz Mawete

"Olingi Nini" (Lingala for "What you want") is a song recorded by Congolese singer Gaz Mawete that was successful and gained over 4.3 million views on YouTube.

== See also ==
- KeBlack
- Youssoupha
- Fally Ipupa
- Naza (rapper)
