= Africa Music & Charts =

Music certification organization

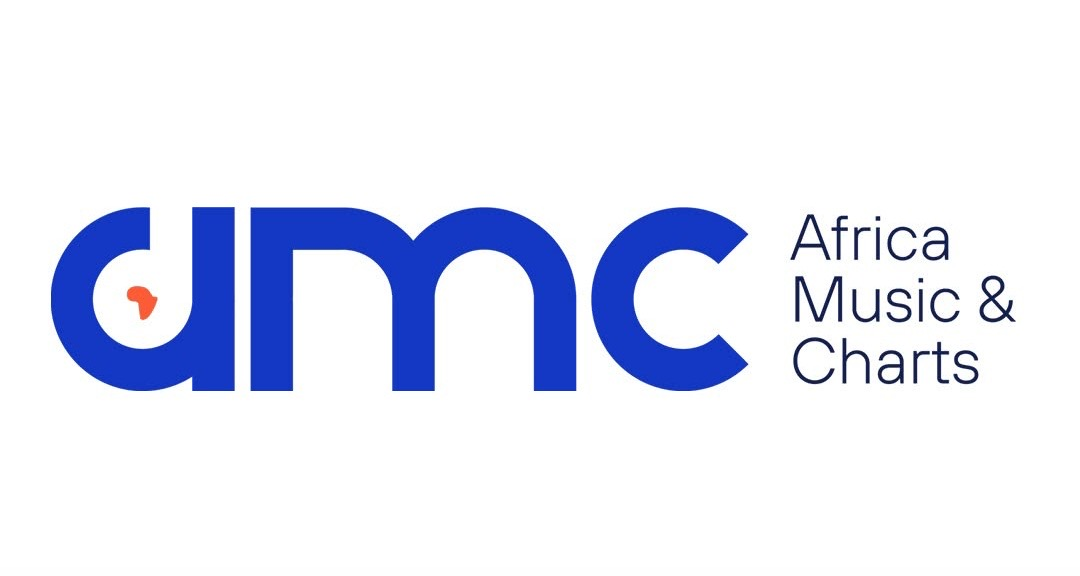
- Abbreviation: AMC
- Formation: 28 November 2024; 23 months ago
- Type: Music certification and chart organization
- Headquarters: Dakar, Senegal
- Location: Senegal
- President: Diadame Diaw
- Website: africamusicandcharts.com

Africa Music & Charts (AMC) is a pan-African music certification and chart organization that measures and recognizes the commercial performance of musical recordings in Francophone Africa. It was founded in 2024 and officially launched in Dakar, Senegal. AMC evaluates the commercial success of music releases using data from physical sales, digital downloads, audio streams, and video streams. It is the first organization dedicated exclusively to music certifications and charts across Francophone Africa.

AMC was created to address the lack of standardized music certification systems in Africa and to ensure that African artists receive formal recognition based on verified consumption figures. The organization works with artists, record labels, distributors, streaming services, and other industry stakeholders to collect and audit financial and consumption reports before issuing certifications.

== Governance ==
AMC is led by its founder and president, Diadame Diaw. It is advised by a professional council composed of executives, producers, artists, managers, publishers, and representatives of major music companies and digital distribution platforms operating across Francophone Africa.

Professional Council (Conseil professionnel):

Member	Position	Organization
Julie Mourchid	Producer and artist manager	Jah Productions/Ouway Africa
Fowndi Edoukou	Director of digital	Universal Music Africa
Pit Baccardi	Artist and producer	Gold Prod
Mérou Dieng	Country manager	Believe Music
Thibaut Mullings	Head of label development and A&R Africa	IDOL
Marc-André Niang	Co-director	Warner Music Africa Francophone
Moussa Wagué	Founder	Keyzit
Jean-Michel Bonard	Head of music business	Trace Urban
Christian Lepira	Africa projects manager	Bomayé Musik
Elvis Adidiema	Managing director	Sony Music Africa Francophone
Julien Jaubert	Independent publisher	Topomic/Les Flammes
Afi Cakpo	Country manager	ONErpm
Babacar Mbaye	Managing director	Hoside

== History ==
Before to the creation of AMC, artists in Francophone Africa had no regional industry-wide certification system comparable to those operating in Europe and North America. While many African musicians accumulated millions of streams and built large audiences across the continent and in the diaspora, there was no standardized mechanism for certifying commercial success based on verified data. AMC president Diadame Diaw stated that the organization was created to offer greater transparency in artist recognition while supporting the development and professionalization of the continent's music industry. The initiative also emerged amid the rapid growth of streaming services, digital distribution, and online music consumption across Africa.

AMC was officially launched on 28 November 2024 in Dakar, Senegal, during a ceremony held at the Institut Français du Sénégal and was supported by Senegalese singer and cultural figure Youssou N'Dour, as well as Ndongo D from the group Daara J and Jessy Matador. The launch brought together artists, producers, record executives, and other music industry stakeholders from across the continent, and during the event, AMC outlined its mission of creating a transparent and reliable certification system based on physical sales, digital downloads, and streaming data. It also announced that certifications would be awarded using verified financial reports provided by distributors and rights holders rather than relying solely on publicly available streaming counts. AMC formed an advisory council that included representatives from YouTube, Sony Music Africa, Universal Music Africa, and other music industry organizations.

On 26 May 2025, AMC held a major presentation at the Ivoire Trade Center (ITC) in Abidjan, Côte d'Ivoire. The event introduced the certification system to a wider African audience and presented the results of the first certification campaign. The ceremony was attended by artists, producers, music executives, and cultural leaders.

== Certification system ==
AMC's certification system is based on verified consumption figures supplied by record labels, distributors, and rights holders. Before issuing any certification, the organization reviews and audits the submitted data.

Unlike many European certification bodies, AMC includes premium and free streaming platforms in its calculations, including YouTube. The organization maintains that this methodology better reflects the realities of music consumption across Africa, where video-based music consumption is particularly widespread. Supporters believe that the initiative helps counter the perception that African artists must obtain European recognition in order to validate their success. Music producer Charles Tabu has argued that AMC allows musicians to gain recognition without changing their sound to appeal to foreign commercial markets. Other streaming services include Spotify, Apple Music, Amazon Music, Deezer, Tidal, Audiomack, Boomplay, Joox, Qobuz, Anghami, Claro Música, Gaana, Genie Music, Hungama, KKBox, Awa, NetEase Music, QQ Music, KuGou, Kuwo, Wynk Music, and JioSaavn.

=== Album ===
Album certifications are based on equivalent sales, which combine physical sales, digital downloads, audio streaming, and video streaming.

The certification thresholds are:

Certification	Equivalent sales
Gold	5,000
Platinum	10,000
Double Platinum	20,000
Triple Platinum	30,000
Diamond	50,000

=== Single ===
Single certifications are based on equivalent streams derived from downloads and streaming activity. Under AMC's methodology, one download is counted as the equivalent of 150 streams.

The certification thresholds are:

Certification	Equivalent streams
Gold	5 million
Platinum	10 million
Diamond	30 million

== Record holders (as of the 2026 AMC certifications) ==
Record	Artist and release	Achievement
Most certified artist	Fally Ipupa	75 AMC certifications
Most certified song	Magic System – "Magic in the Air"	21× Diamond
Most certified album	Magic System – Africainement vôtre	9× Diamond
Most certified album by a solo artist	Fally Ipupa – Tokooos	6× Diamond
Most certifications in a single AMC campaign	Fally Ipupa	39 certifications (2025 campaign)
First AMC-certified artist	Youssou N'Dour	Special certification awarded at AMC's launch in 2024
