= Cardinal College (disambiguation) =

Cardinal College or College Cardinals may refer to:

== Bodies ==
- College of Cardinals, Roman Catholic Church; the body of the cardinal-princes of the Church

== University colleges ==
- Cardinal College (est. 1525), Christ Church, University at Oxford, Oxford, Oxfordshire, England, UK; a constituent college of Oxford University
- Collège du Cardinal Le Moine (est. 1302; Cardinal Lemoine College; formerly Maison du Cardinal, Collège du Cardinal), University of Paris, Paris, France; a constituent college of Paris University

== Schools ==
- Cardinal Cushing College (1952–1972), Brookline, Massachusetts, USA; a women's Catholic college
- Cardinal Griffin Catholic College (est. 1960), Cannock, Staffordshire, England, UK; a co-ed Catholic secondary school
- Cardinal Newman College (est. 1978), Preston, Lancashire, England, UK; a sixth-form college
- Ipswich School, established as Cardinal's College of St. Mary in 1528
- Cardinal Malula University (est. 2001), Kinshasa, Congo

== College sports teams ==
College Cardinals may refer to:

- Ball State Cardinals, Ball State University, Muncie, Indiana, USA
- Catholic University Cardinals, Catholic University of America, Washington, D.C., USA
- Incarnate Word Cardinals, University of the Incarnate Word, Texas, USA
- Lamar Cardinals and Lady Cardinals, Lamar University, Beaumont, Texas, USA
- Louisville Cardinals, University of Louisville, Louisville, Kentucky, USA
- Saginaw Valley State Cardinals, Saginaw Valley State University, University Center, Michigan, USA
- Stanford Cardinal, Stanford University, Stanford, California, USA
- Wesleyan Cardinals, Wesleyan University, Middletown, Connecticut, USA
- Wheeling Cardinals, Wheeling University, Wheeling, West Virginia, USA
- William Jewell Cardinals, William Jewell College, Liberty, Missouri, USA

== Periodicals ==
College Cardinal may refer to:

- The Louisville Cardinal, University of Louisville, Louisville, Kentucky, USA; a college newspaper
- The Daily Cardinal, University of Wisconsin–Madison, Madison, Wisconsin, USA; a college newspaper

== See also ==
- Council of Cardinals, Roman Curia, Holy See, Vatican, Roman Catholic Church
