= Bazardée =

Single by KeBlack

from the album Premier étage
- Released: 26 November 2016
- Genre: Pop
- Songwriters: Djazzi; Cédric Mateta Knomi; Jean Désiré Sosso-Dzabatou; Moussa Mansaly; La Yenne Brune

"Bazardée" is a song by KeBlack released in 2016. The song has peaked at number seven on the French Singles Chart.

== Charts ==
Chart (2017)	Peak position
Belgium (Ultratop 50 Wallonia)	23
France (SNEP)	7
