= Cardinal Malula University =

Public University

- Université Cardinal Malula
- Type: Public university
- Established: October 1, 2001
- Location: Kinshasa, Democratic Republic of the Congo; 4°20′44″S 15°21′00″E
- Language: French

Cardinal Malula University (French: Université Cardinal Malula) is a public university located in Kinshasa, the capital city of the Democratic Republic of the Congo. The institution, named in honor of Joseph-Albert Malula, conducts its instruction primarily in French.

== History ==
Cardinal Malula University was officially established on October 1, 2001, as part of a broader reform in the higher education sector in the Democratic Republic of the Congo. It became autonomous through ministerial decree n°157/MINESU/CABMIN/EBK/PK/2010, issued on September 27, 2010. This decree was part of the government's initiative to decentralize higher education institutions and improve their efficiency.

== Faculties ==
Cardinal Malula University offers a diverse range of programs across multiple faculties:

- Faculty of Agronomy
- Faculty of Law
- Faculty of Medicine
- Faculty of Computer Science, Political Science, and Administration
- Faculty of Economics and Management
- Faculty of Public Health

These faculties aim to address national needs in agriculture, governance, health, and technology.

== Notable alumni ==
The university has produced several notable individuals who have contributed significantly to Congolese society:

- Ève Bazaiba, a prominent politician and environmental advocate, who has played a critical role in promoting sustainable policies in the Democratic Republic of the Congo.
- Stanis Bujakera Tshiamala, a journalist known for his investigative reporting and analysis of political issues in the Congo.
- Jean-Marie Lukulasi Massamba, a public health expert recognized for his contributions to improving health systems in rural areas.

== See also ==
- Education in the Democratic Republic of the Congo
- List of universities in the Democratic Republic of the Congo
