= Claro TV =

Brazilian satellite TV company (founded 2008)

- Industry: Telecommunication
- Founded: December 16, 2008; 17 years ago (as Via Embratel); March 1, 2012; 14 years ago (as Claro TV)
- Headquarters: Rio de Janeiro, Brazil; Sao Paulo, Brazil (via Claro Brasil); Mexico City, Mexico (via América Móvil)
- Products: Satellite television
- Parent: América Móvil
- Website: www.claro.com

Embratel TVsat Telecomunicações S.A. (simply as Claro TV), is a Latin American operator of pay television. The service is supplied by Embratel and Claro companies and operates in Star One C4 satellite. Its transmission system is DTH (Direct to Home) in K_{u} Band, and the channels are encrypted by Nagravision 3 system. The reception is made via mini-satellite dish and a DVB-S2 receiver, and subscribers authentication is made by conditional access card.

== History ==
Logo when still Via Embratel (2008–2012)

In Brazil, it was launched as Via Embratel on December 16, 2008. As of October 2011, Via Embratel had achieved 2,000,000 subscribers. Via Embratel was acquired by Claro on March 1, 2012, with the same service, price, payment method, programming, features and quality. The contract remained the same and the invoice was identified by Claro TV, together with Embratel Livre (which became Claro Fixo). On the same day, the Warner Channel debuted in HD. Via Embratel had operations throughout Brazil, as it operated in the satellite pay TV sector. Via Embratel Banda Larga and Via Embratel Fone were only available in some cities in the states of Mato Grosso, Pará, Piauí, Rio de Janeiro, Rio Grande do Norte, Maranhão and São Paulo. On June 2, 2010 it started selling packages with HD transmission, initially to the states of São Paulo and Rio de Janeiro. Nine channels debuted and were added to the 4 main packages.

In 2012, Claro upgraded its service in Puerto Rico by deploying VRADs in order to launch its IPTV service, which works parallel with their then satellite service.

== Coverage ==
Claro TV+ DTH has operations throughout Brazil. Two of the most popular broadcast networks, however, are not available nationwide:

- TV Globo local affiliates are only available for the 22 most populous markets.
- SBT national feed is available for most Brazilian states (except SP, RJ, DF, RS, SC, PA, PR).

== See also ==
- Claro-musica
