= Jérémie Kabamba =

Congolese media entrepreneur

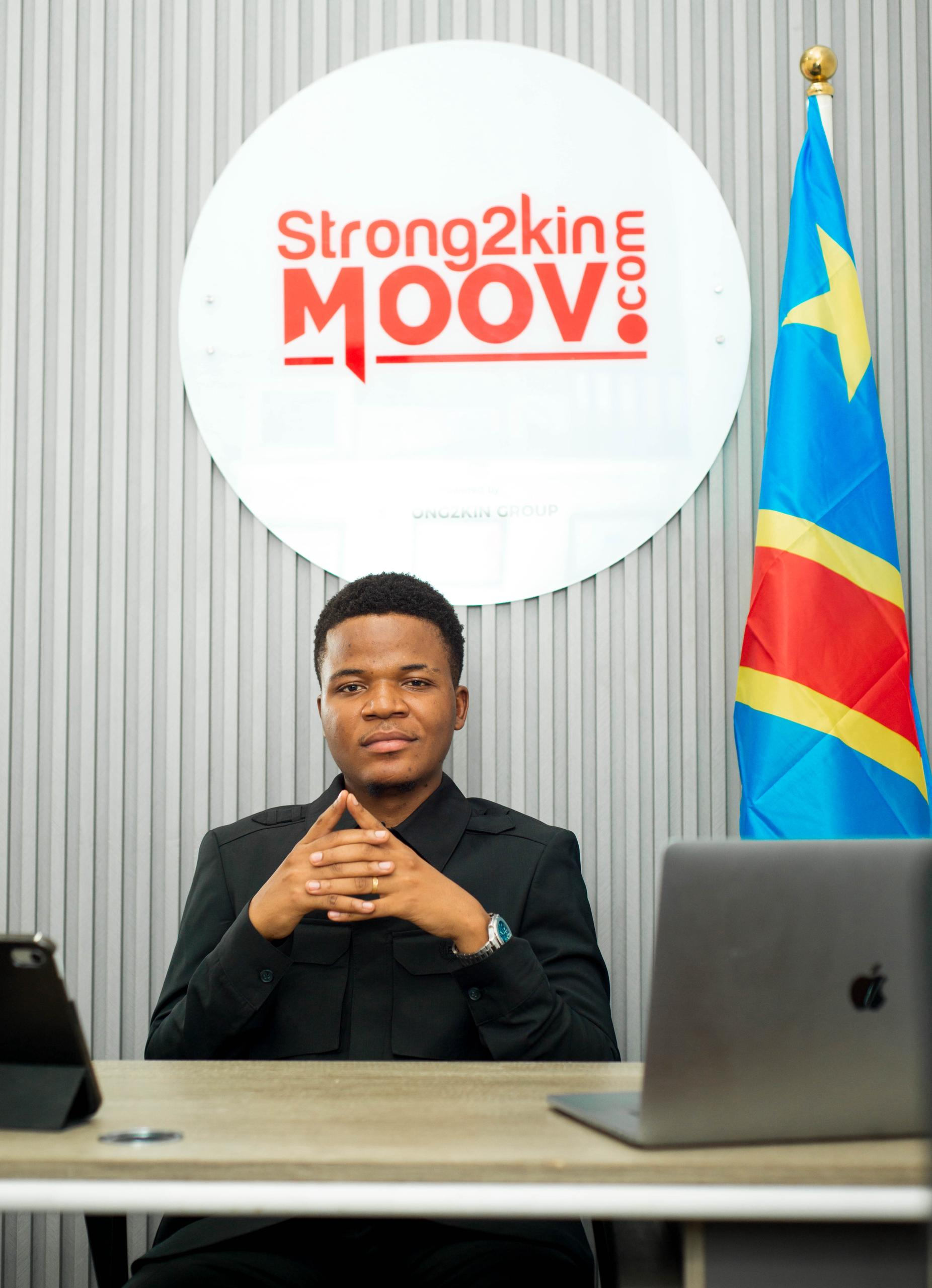
- Kabamba in September 2025
- Born: Jérémie Kabamba Tshibasu; 22 January 1997 (age 29); Mwene-Ditu, Lomami, Democratic Republic of the Congo
- Education: Institut Supérieur de Statistique de Kinshasa (Graduate degree in management information technology; licence in computer networks)
- Occupations: Digital communications specialist; media entrepreneur; community manager
- Years active: 2013–present
- Organizations: Strong2Kin Group; Strong2Kin Moov; Strong Music LTD
- Known for: Founding Strong2Kin Moov
- Title: Founder and chief executive officer of Strong2Kin Moov
- Spouse: Ursula Esomia (m. 2024)
- Parents: Étienne Kabamba (father); Anne-Marie Kiabu (mother)

Jérémie Kabamba Tshibasu (born 22 January 1997) is a Congolese media entrepreneur and digital communications specialist. He is the founder and chief executive officer of Strong2Kin Moov, an online media outlet covering Congolese music, culture, sports, and entertainment. He has also worked in community management for Trace Congo and Divo.

== Early life and education ==
Jérémie Kabamba Tshibasu was born on 22 January 1997 in Mwene-Ditu, Lomami, Democratic Republic of the Congo, to Étienne Kabamba and Anne-Marie Kiabu. His father died when Kabamba was in his fifth year of primary school, and his mother died after he entered university. He completed his secondary education in Kinshasa before studying management information technology and computer networks at the Higher Institute of Statistics of Kinshasa (Institut supérieur de statistique de Kinshasa; ISS). Although his formal studies focused on computing, Kabamba developed his community-management skills independently through online resources and tutorials.

== Career ==
=== Early work in digital communications ===
Kabamba became interested in digital communications around 2013 or 2014 while writing lyrics and performing amateur rap. In 2015, he co-founded a rap music group, Nexxus Music, with his friends and produced several tracks, and a few months later, he left the group and ended his music career in 2016. In 2017, he began working in social media management for the electronics retailer Vivi Market, where he was in charge of managing the company's Facebook page, he then joined the SmartDesign agency, where he held the positions of web manager and head of external marketing.

From June to November 2019, Kabamba worked as a community manager for Trace Congo. That year, he also joined the communications company Divo, where he managed social media accounts for Showbuzz, CineBuzz, and Buzz FM. He later worked remotely for the Paris-based organization Hewani.

=== Strong2Kin Moov ===
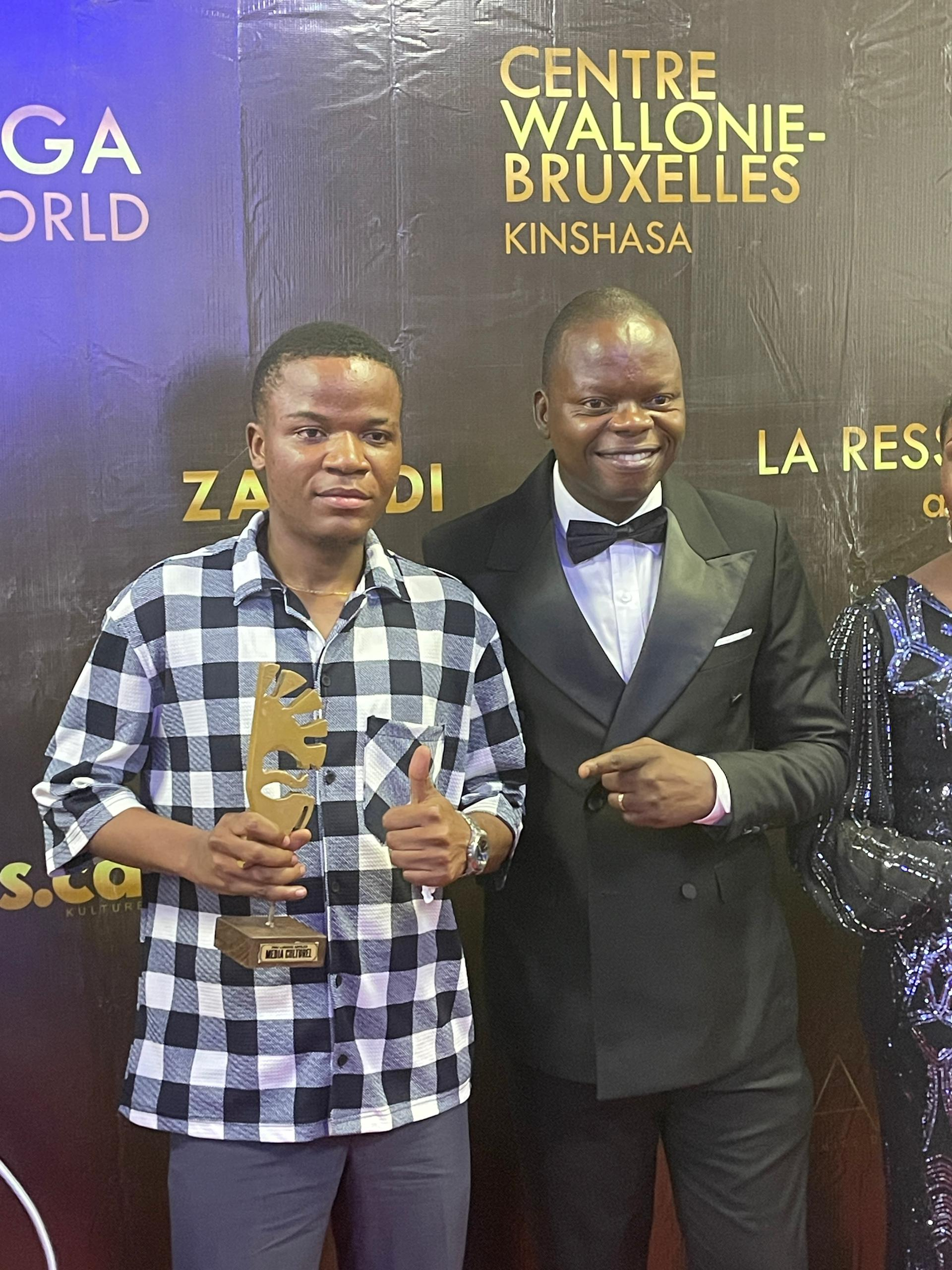
Kabamba and Onassis Mutombo

The idea for Strong2Kin Moov originated in Kabamba's final-year university project, titled "Designing a Website for an Online Magazine". With assistance from friends and an academic supervisor, he developed a prototype and, after defending the project, launched Strong2Kin Moov as a Facebook page in January 2018. The outlet's early development was constrained by limited financing, equipment, and internet access. Kabamba recalled attending artists' rehearsals during the day and publishing stories at night using an overnight internet plan, a routine he continued for more than a year before securing partnerships that helped cover internet costs. He initially kept his identity separate from Strong2Kin Moov for about two years, fearing that his age would undermine his credibility with artists and potential partners. As the outlet grew, Kabamba assembled an editorial and production team.

Kabamba subsequently organized his businesses under Strong2Kin Group, which was officially established in May 2022. Its ventures include Strong2Kin Gospel, a media platform focused on gospel music; Strong Digital Academy, which provides training in digital communications; and Strong Music LTD, a music company focused on emerging artists.

The outlet previously considered launching a television channel, but Kabamba said in 2025 that the plan had been abandoned as audiences and broadcasters increasingly shifted toward digital platforms. He has also discussed plans to train younger community managers and establish a division providing digital communications services to companies and public figures.

== Personal life ==
Kabamba married Ursula Esomia in 2024. Their civil marriage took place in the commune of Mont-Ngafula on 27 April, followed by a religious ceremony at Emmanuel Shama Church on 3 August.

During the night of 31 August to 1 September 2025, Kabamba was the victim of a burglary at his home in Kinshasa.

== Awards and recognition ==
In 2023, Strong2Kin Moov won the Lokumu Award for Best Media, which Kabamba accepted on the outlet's behalf. In 2025, he accepted a recognition award from the Nkita Expo Forum on behalf of Strong2Kin Moov and was nominated for the Entrepreneur award at the Mwinda Awards.
