= Mbote.cd =

Congolese media website

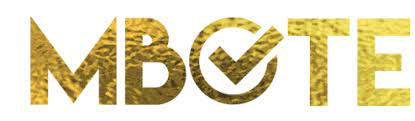
- Website type: Online news website
- Available in: French
- Founded: 1 November 2017; 8 years ago by Deogratias BAISE and Patient BAISE
- Headquarters: Gombe, Kinshasa, Democratic Republic of the Congo
- Owner: Mbote Africa SARL
- Key people: Déogratias Baise (managing director)
- Website: mbote.cd
- Current status: Active

Mbote.cd (stylized as MBOTE.CD) is a Congolese online media outlet based in Gombe, Kinshasa, Democratic Republic of the Congo. It was founded on 1 November 2017 and covers entertainment, culture, society, sports, and politics. The outlet is operated by Mbote Africa SARL and has been a member of the Online Information Media of the Democratic Republic of the Congo (MILRDC) since its launch.

== History ==
Mbote.cd began operating in Gombe, Kinshasa on 1 November 2017. Managing director Déogratias Baise said the publication was founded because its creators believed there was a lack of locally produced entertainment journalism in the Congolese digital media market, as many Congolese audiences often depended on foreign outlets, particularly Ivorian media, for news and gossip about Congolese celebrities. Congolese local cultural publications often avoided entertainment stories because they feared such coverage could affect their image as serious news sources.

Before its launch, Mbote.cd was associated with Next Corp, a Congolese digital media company founded in August 2016. A Next Corp recruitment notice published by Radio Okapi in April 2017 identified Mbote.cd, alongside Actualite.cd and Foot.cd, as among the company's digital publications, which were promoted to advertisers through Next Partner Solutions. By 2021, Mbote.cd was described as a media outlet of Mbote Africa SARL. Actualite.cd reported that year that it had been a member of the Online Information Media of the Democratic Republic of the Congo (MILRDC) since its launch.

== Content, editorial, and organization ==
Mbote.cd initially focused on entertainment and youth culture, including celebrity news, music, popular culture and trends. It later expanded its coverage to include society, politics and sports. Its content is produced in formats including articles, videos and infographics. In 2021, managing director Déogratias Baise said that the company had invested in a multimedia studio for in-house productions and aimed to become a major producer of video content in the Democratic Republic of the Congo and Africa. Its management has also expressed an interest in organizing the MBOTE Awards, a proposed ceremony to recognize figures in the entertainment industry.

Mbote.cd is operated by Mbote Africa SARL and is based in the Gombe commune of Kinshasa. It is organized into several departments, including general management, administration and finance, commercial operations, editorial, and production. The general management team consists of Deo and Patient, while Andy Mukanya leads the administration and finance department. The commercial department is headed by Anthony Kalobo, who also handles public relations, and includes Beatrice Munguba.

Deo leads the editorial department as director of publication. Other members of the editorial team include Jegou Miguel Mpiutu and Jolsin Mpoyi as editors, Harris Mbaa as copywriter, Grace Izi Diakubama as sports journalist, and Thimothé Mampuya as reporter. The production team consists of presenter Beatrice Munguba, director and video editor Joel Kabeya, and camera operator Ciceron Mutela.

== Awards and nominations ==
Year	Event	Prize	Result	Ref.
2023	Prix Lokumu	Best Cultural Media	Nominated	
