= Online Information Media of the Democratic Republic of the Congo =

Professional association for Congolese online media

- Médias d'Information en Ligne de la République démocratique du Congo
- Founded: 16 June 2017; 9 years ago
- Founded at: Sultani Hotel, Kinshasa
- Type: Nonprofit trade association
- Headquarters: Gombe, Kinshasa
- Key people: Israël Mutala (president); Patient Ligodi (vice president); Eric Tshikuma (secretary-general); Patrick Lakwe (deputy secretary-general); Chris Elongo (treasurer)

The Online Information Media of the Democratic Republic of the Congo (French: Médias d'Information en Ligne de la République démocratique du Congo; MILRDC) is a Congolese trade association representing online media outlets. Its headquarters are in Gombe, Kinshasa. MILRDC promotes the professional interests of online media outlets, journalistic ethics, training, press freedom, and the economic sustainability of digital journalism. It also participates in media policy discussions and supports the digital transformation of traditional media outlets.

The idea for MILRDC developed during an online media roundtable in December 2016. Its statutes were approved at a general assembly in February 2017, and the association officially began operating on 16 June 2017.

== History ==
MILRDC grew out of the first national roundtable on online media, organized in December 2016 by the CSAC in partnership with Internews and Actualite.cd. The event brought together more than 50 journalists, bloggers, and media experts from across the DRC and recommended creating a trade association to represent the country's online news outlets. The association held its founding general assembly in February 2017. The meeting brought together 25 professionals representing 12 member media outlets. After adopting its statutes, the assembly unanimously appointed a board of directors to a renewable one-year term. Patient Ligodi of Next Corp and Actualite.cd was elected president, while Israël Mutala of 7sur7.cd became vice president. Eric Tshikuma of Zoom Eco was appointed secretary-general, Patrick Lakwe of Sakola.info deputy secretary-general, and Chris Elongo of Cas Info treasurer.

MILRDC officially began operating on 16 June 2017 following a launch ceremony at the Sultani Hotel in Kinshasa. The event was attended by representatives from the CSAC, the National Union of the Congolese Press (Union nationale de la presse du Congo; UNPC), the University of Information and Communication Sciences (Université des Sciences de l'Information et de la Communication; UNISIC), Internews, and several Congolese media organizations. The association's initial action plan focused on training, journalistic ethics, and the economic sustainability of online media. At the time of the launch, MILRDC said it had 14 full members whose websites reached a combined audience of more than four million people.

In August 2017, MILRDC condemned restrictions on social media and multimedia sharing imposed by the country's telecommunications regulator. In July 2019, MILRDC also protested after online media outlets were excluded from a press conference held by outgoing prime minister Bruno Tshibala. It argued that online media should receive the same access to official information as newspapers, radio stations, and television channels. In response, the association asked its members not to report, publish, or broadcast content from the conference.

In May 2020, MILRDC took part in a training-of-trainers program on web and mobile journalism with a focus on gender. Later, in October 2021, the association worked with Internews and the European Union to support a hackathon aimed at creating a platform for identifying and reporting misinformation in the DRC. Following the Estates General of Communication and Media (États généraux de la communication et des médias), MILRDC organized a workshop in February 2022 to share its recommendations on online media with its members. MILRDC president Israël Mutala stated that 57 of the conference's 80 recommendations supported the growth of online media. These proposals included changing the duties, taxes, and fees placed on digital media, establishing a credit-guarantee fund for media companies, and improving media regulation, self-regulation, and co-regulation.

With support from Internews, MILRDC and the Federation of Businesses of the Congo held a meeting in May 2022 on the media's role in the growth of private businesses. The event sought to improve cooperation between digital media outlets and companies while presenting plans to create an online advertising network. Three months later, MILRDC and Internews began a month-long campaign promoting fact-checking and the responsible use of information from unreliable sources. The campaign encouraged journalists to verify information and comply with professional standards.

In 2023, the association took part in preparing a charter against election-related hate speech. The charter set out ten commitments for media organizations, including establishing mechanisms for reporting hateful content on digital platforms. In February 2024, Reporters Without Borders (RSF) chose MILRDC to receive satellite internet equipment under a program intended to protect internet access during network shutdowns or disruptions. The selected organizations also received free satellite internet service for six months.

In September 2024, MILRDC welcomed the outcome of the UNPC's tenth congress, during which it participated in reviewing amendments to the union's statutes. The congress adopted MILRDC's proposal that the UNPC advocate media access to the assistance provided under the Ordinance-Law of 13 March 2023. It also accepted the association's recommendation that the UNPC's professional-training commission establish an annual training schedule. MILRDC subsequently offered to assist the union's new leadership on matters concerning online media.

== Organization and leadership ==
According to its statutes, MILRDC's objectives include:

- representing the interests of online media in public discussions and decisions affecting the press;
- promoting high-quality online journalism in accordance with the Congolese journalists' code of ethics and professional standards;
- providing training and professional-development programs for online media personnel;
- advocating legal and institutional reforms that address the particular needs of online media;
- promoting the economic sustainability of online news organizations;
- supporting the digital transformation of traditional media outlets; and
- encouraging the creation of journalism start-ups.

MILRDC is governed by a board of directors chosen by the general assembly for renewable one-year terms. At the association's founding general assembly in February 2017, the board consisted of Patient Ligodi of Next Corp and Actualite.cd as president, Israël Mutala of 7sur7.cd as vice president, Eric Tshikuma of Zoom Eco as secretary-general, Patrick Lakwe of Sakola.info as deputy secretary-general, and Chris Elongo of Cas Info as treasurer. The association also established a disciplinary and ethics commission chaired by Axel Gontcho of UNISIC. Its other members were Gino Rehema of Top Congo FM, Turine Ngwala of UNISIC, Déo Safari of UPN, and Prince Yassa of Kinshasa Times.

On 24 August 2018, the general assembly unanimously elected Mutala president, succeeding Ligodi, who did not seek a second term and became vice president. Tshikuma, Lakwe, and Elongo retained their respective positions as secretary-general, deputy secretary-general, and treasurer. The disciplinary commission remained unchanged.
