= Claro Música =

Music streaming platform

- Company type: Subsidiary
- Available in: Spanish and Portuguese
- Founded: 2014
- Industry: Music
- Services: Music streaming
- Parent: Claro
- Website: www.claromusica.com
- Users: 5 million (as of 2015)
- Current status: Active

Claro Música is a music streaming platform available in South America and Central America. This service is offered in countries where the Claro telephone platform exists, for Windows, Android and iOS devices. It has playlists, radios, podcasts, and other divisions in its interface by musical genres.

== History ==
It was launched in 2014, and two years later it already had more than twenty million songs in its catalog and more than 40,000 subscribers. Since its inception, Claro Música has opted to provide its users with hits of international music and local artists from each region where it has services, and has even supported them with the production of some of their video clips.

As a promotional strategy, it makes agreements with artists or segments of the musical environment, also organizes events such as Claro Música fest, and exclusive concerts such as the reunion of the RBD group in 2020.

Currently, it is available in Argentina, Brazil, Chile, Colombia, Costa Rica, Ecuador, El Salvador, Guatemala, Honduras, Mexico, Nicaragua, Panama, Paraguay, Peru, Dominican Republic and Uruguay.

== See also ==
- Claro TV
- List of on-demand streaming music services
