= Stanis Bujakera Tshiamala =

Congolese journalist

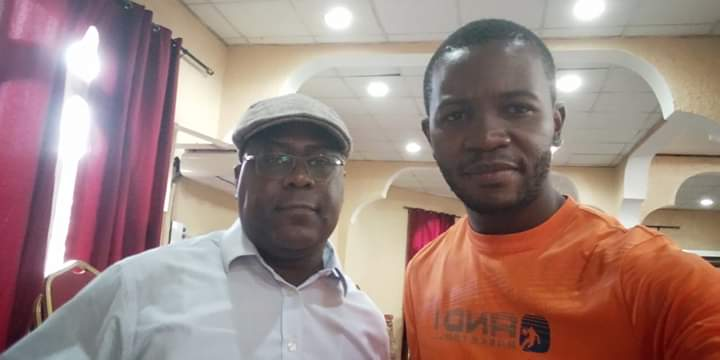
- Félix Tshisekedi and Stanis Bujakera
- Born: 1990 (age 35–36); Kinshasa, DRCongo
- Occupations: Journalist, social activist

Stanis Bujakera Tshiamala is a Democratic Republic of Congo journalist working for the pan-African magazine Jeune Afrique, correspondent for the British press agency Reuters and since 2017 at Actualite.cd.

== Early life and career ==
Stanis Bujakera Tshimanala was born on August 21, 1990, and grew up in the city of Kinshasa, son of an electrical engineer and pastor of a Protestant church, Matthieu Ntita Tshiamala, and Odia Mbombo Kalombo. His passion for journalism and communication goes back to his youngest age, holder of a diploma in journalism from the Training School for Journalists and Computer scientists in Kinshasa. He continued his studies in information and communication science at the National Pedagogical University until obtaining another diploma, he went to IFASIC (Institut facultaire des sciences de l'information et de la communication) where, following financial difficulties, he dropped out during his first year of training.

He began his journalism career in 2011 in the editorial board of RTVS1 radio after a professional internship. At the same time studying at Cardinal Malula University where he left with a brief. Subsequently, Stanis Bujakera became Desk Reportage Manager for the Politico.cd website until its impromptu closure in 2016, correspondent for the British press agency Reuters and journalist for the pan-African magazine Jeune Afrique. He is a journalist at Actualite.cd since its creation in 2016 by the co-founder of Politico.cd and the director of the radio station Univers FM, the journalist Patient Ligodi. On September 8, 2023, Stanis Bujakera Tshiamala was arrested and placed in detention by the Kinshasa judicial police.. On February 23, 2024, Stanis Bujakera Tshiamala's lawyers filed a new request for release. Congolese President Félix Tshisekedi estimated that Stanis Bujakera Tshiamala is “perhaps a victim” of “sick” justice.

On March 8, 2024, the prosecution requested twenty years in prison against Stanis Bujakera, for “counterfeiting, forgery, use of forgery, propagation of false rumors”. On March 18, 2024, Stanis Bujakera was sentenced to six months in prison, a sentence which already covers his period of preventive detention. Stanis Bujakera's lawyers have decided to appeal the verdict. On March 19, Bujakera was free from jail but prosecutors appealed the decision.

== Personal life ==
Stanis Bujakera Tshimanala is a reporter in the political field, particularly Congolese. During his career, he refused to be part of several ministerial cabinets, even more recently to be part of the Presidential press under President Felix Tshisekedi, preferring not to "jeopardize its independence" since he was arrested or threatened several times under the regime of former Congolese president Joseph Kabila. He is the husband of Armelle Mbayi Tshiamala with whom they live between Kinshasa and Washington, D.C., in the United States.
