= Institut Français du Sénégal =

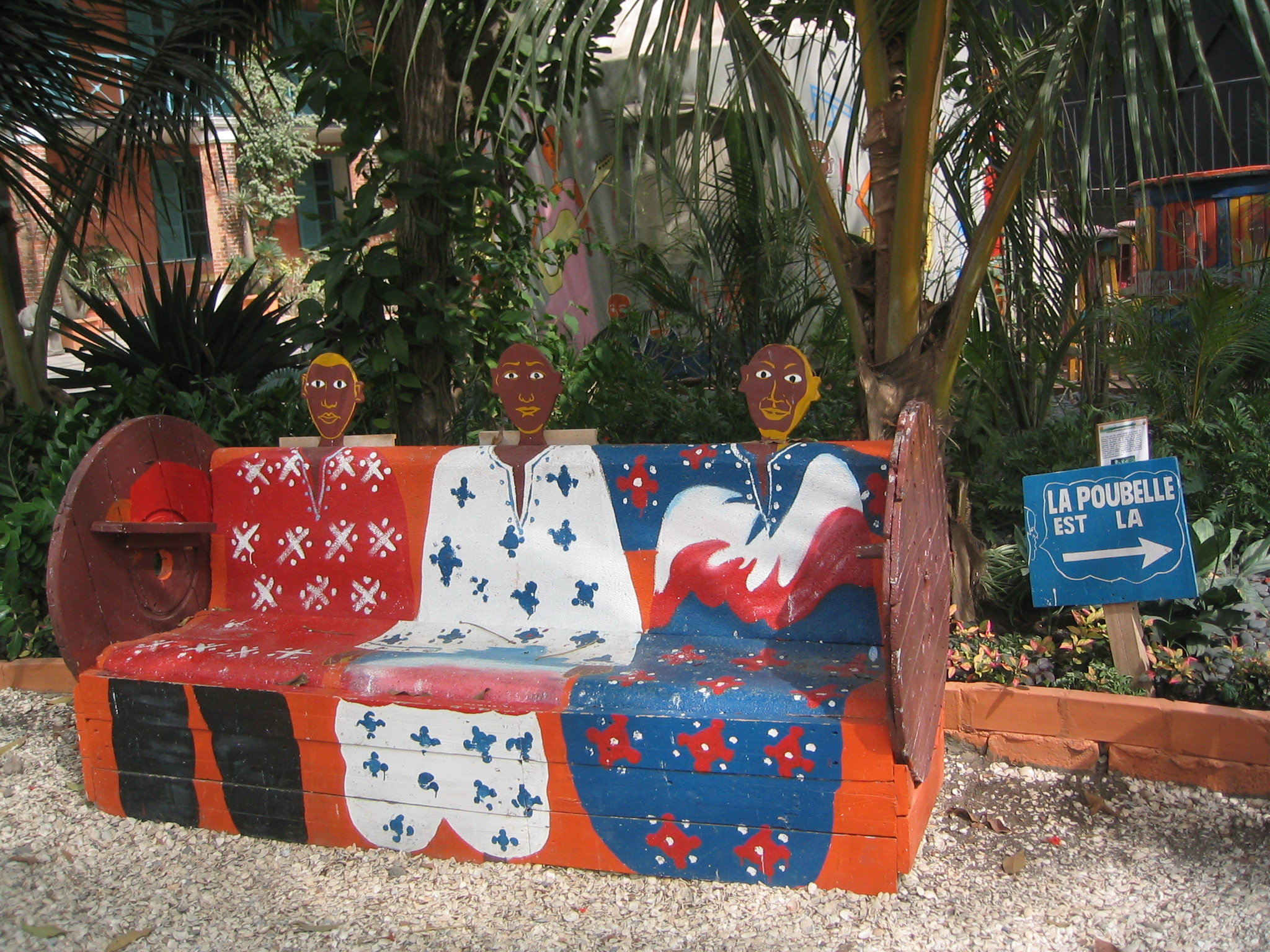
Decorated bench in the garden of the Institute

The Institut Français du Sénégal is a French cultural organization for the diffusion of French culture in Senegal. Its secondary purpose is to promote the culture of Senegal and, more generally, cultural diversity. Léopold Sédar Senghor called this intercultural cooperation le dialogue des cultures (the dialogue of cultures).

== History ==
The current name of the institution is recent. Earlier, it was called the Centre Culturel Français de Dakar ("French cultural centre of Dakar"), or simply the Alliance Française.

== Organization ==
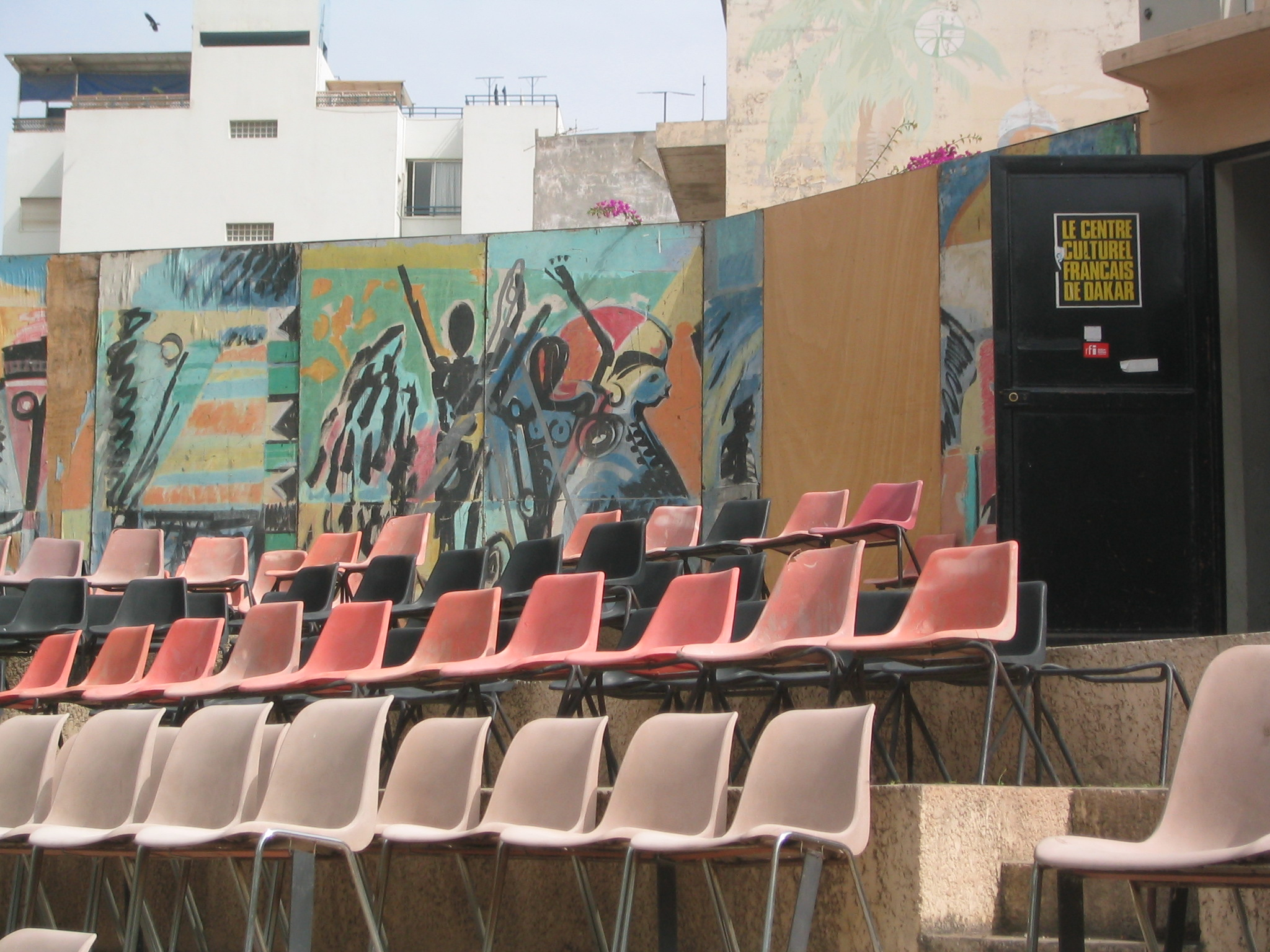
Outdoor cinema

The Institute is composed of a cultural centre and a language centre. The cultural centre holds concerts, dances, theatre, fashion shows, lectures, exhibitions, workshops, and festivals while the language centre offers language courses, certifications, and technology training. French, Wolof, Spanish, and Portuguese are all taught at the language centre.

The director is Jean-Yves Pouliquen. He succeeded Christian Saglio, who left the Institute on July 5, 2007.
