= Univers Rumba Congolaise =

Congolese online media organization

Univers Rumba Congolaise (URC) is a Paris-based online media organization dedicated to documenting and promoting Congolese rumba. Founded by Paulka Hassan Lengo, it publishes material on the genre's history and musicians, including biographies, discographies, interviews, and music news.
