= Strong2Kin Moov =

Congolese digital media outlet

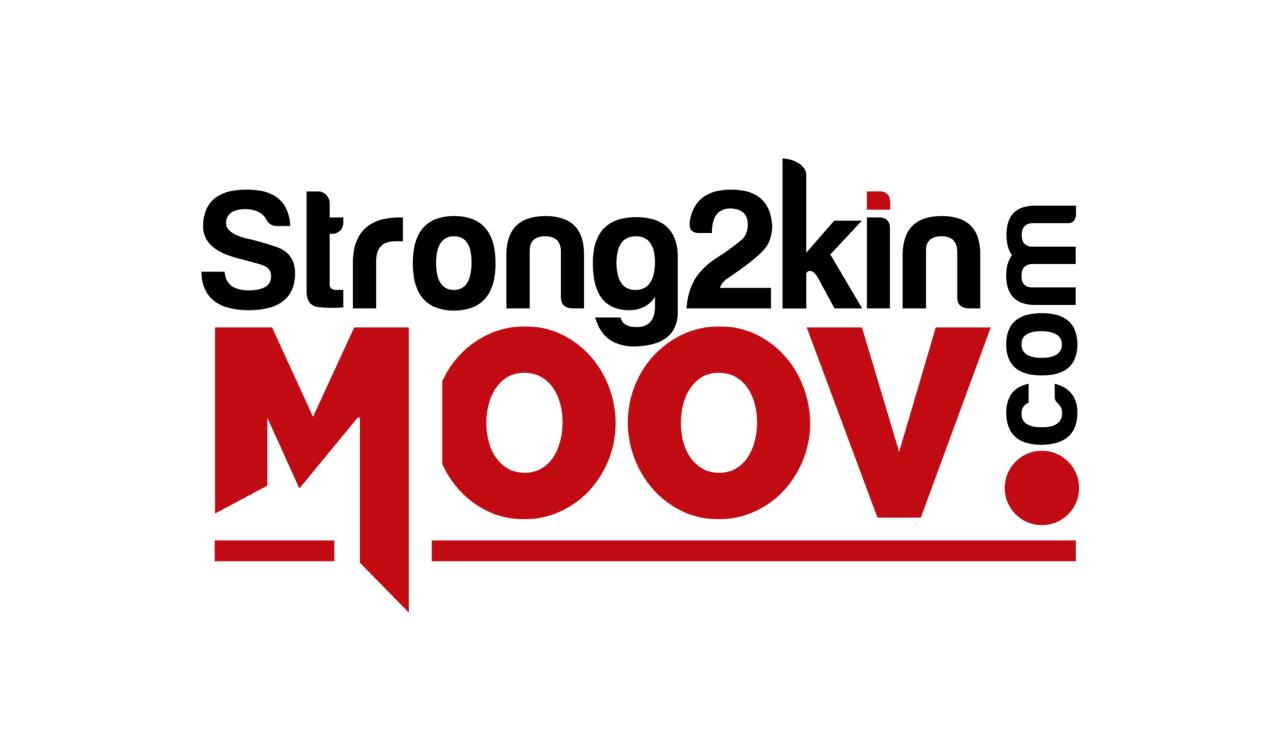
- Website type: Digital media outlet
- Available in: French
- Founded: 22 January 2018; 8 years ago
- Headquarters: Barumbu, Kinshasa, Democratic Republic of the Congo
- Owner: Strong2Kin Group
- Founder: Jérémie Kabamba
- CEO: Jérémie Kabamba
- Website: strong2kinmoov.com
- Current status: Active

Strong2Kin Moov is a Congolese digital media outlet covering music, culture, sports, and entertainment in the Democratic Republic of the Congo. Founded by Congolese media entrepreneur Jérémie Kabamba, Strong2Kin Moov began operating in January 2018 and initially focused on promoting urban musicians and emerging artists. Its coverage later expanded to gospel music, sports, and other cultural events. Strong2Kin Moov is part of Strong2Kin Group, which also includes Strong2Kin Gospel and the music company Strong Music LTD. It is headquartered in Barumbu, Kinshasa.

== History ==
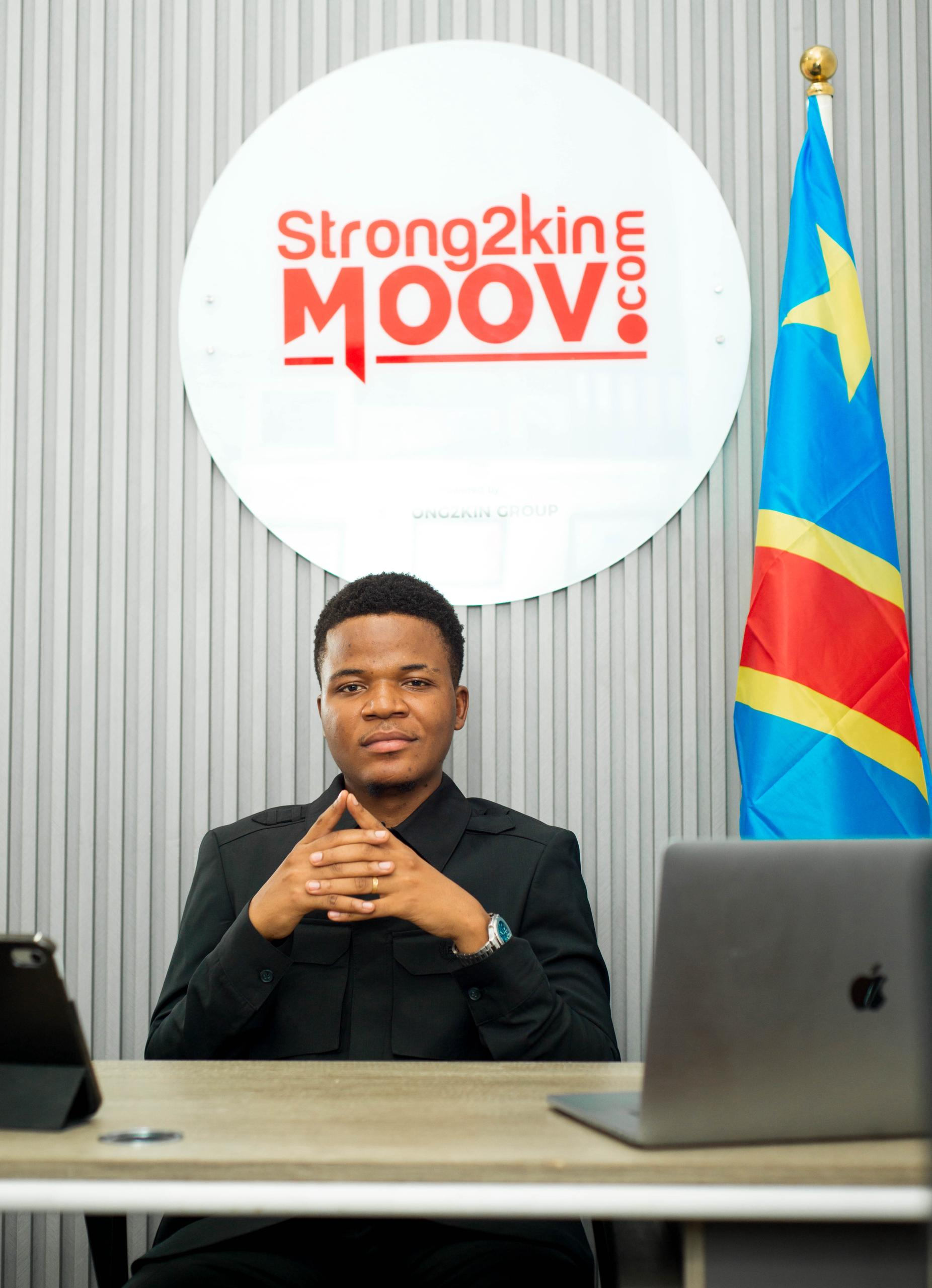
Kabamba in September 2025

Strong2Kin Moov was established on 22 January 2018 in Barumbu, Kinshasa. The outlet initially operated through a Facebook page and focused on urban music popular among younger Congolese audiences. Its initial objective was to give greater exposure to emerging musicians, particularly artists from disadvantaged quarters who received limited coverage from established media. Recalling the outlet's early difficulties, Kabamba said, "I did not have an office", explaining that he frequently worked from a graphic designer friend's office and, because of power outages at home, from restaurants where he could charge his devices. Strong2Kin Moov's initial reliance on Facebook was attributed to the platform's popularity among young Congolese users and the relatively high cost of internet access in the country.

During 2018, Strong2Kin Moov expanded its presence to Instagram, YouTube, and Twitter. In 2019, it launched its website to provide more extensive cultural coverage, including feature stories, artist profiles, interviews, and reports. The outlet subsequently expanded its editorial staff, adding writers covering music, sports, and cultural events. In March 2020, it expanded to TikTok with short-form entertainment content and later increased its YouTube programming featuring emerging Congolese artists. Strong2Kin Moov also established Strong2Kin Gospel, a division focused on gospel music and Christian entertainment, separating this content from its coverage of secular popular music. In July 2021, Strong2Kin Group launched Strong Music LTD, a music company focused on emerging Congolese artists; by 2022, it had signed K2 Shab's and Exauss Feeling. Radio Okapi subsequently described Strong2Kin Moov as a platform promoting emerging Congolese artists.

== Organization ==
Strong2Kin Moov is headed by founder and chief executive officer Jérémie Kabamba and operates as part of Strong2Kin Group, alongside Strong2Kin Gospel and Strong Music LTD.

Strong2Kin Moov publishes cultural news, interviews, profiles, feature articles, and audiovisual content, primarily aimed at young Congolese audiences. In 2022, Kabamba said that increasing competition among Congolese digital media outlets had led Strong2Kin Moov to focus on maintaining a distinctive editorial identity. He also announced plans to establish a television channel focused on young Congolese professionals in music, culture, sports, and event production.

== Awards and nominations ==
Year	Event	Prize	Result	Ref.
2023	Prix Lokumu	Best Cultural Media	Won	
