= Naza (rapper) =

French rapper

- Born: Jean-Désiré Dimitri Sosso Dzabatou; May 26, 1993 (age 33); Amiens, Picardy, France
- Genres: Hip hop, Afro trap
- Years active: 2015–present
- Labels: Mukongo Business, Bomayé Musik

Jean-Désiré Dimitri Sosso Dzabatou (French pronunciation: [ʒɑ̃ deziʁe dimitʁi soso dzabatu]; born 26 May 1993 in Amiens), better known by his stage name Naza (IPA: [naza]), is a French rapper and singer of Congolese descent. He is signed to the record label Bomayé Musik. Naza has released three albums: Incroyable (2017), C'est la loi (2018), and Bénef (2019). He is also known for collaborating frequently with fellow French rapper KeBlack.

== Career ==
Born in Amiens, his family soon moved to Creil, where they operated a nganda, Congolese style bar-restaurant. He started music early, including cooperating with Cédric Matéta Nkomi, also of Congolese origin, a childhood friend later known as KeBlack and Isaac Ryler.

In 2014, with KeBlack seeing success online and through a collaboration with Youssoupha, he proposed his friend Naza to be featured in a number of releases and to be signed with the label Bomayé Musik, Youssoupha's label. "Gater le coin" became Naza's debut solo hit in 2016 followed by "La débauche" and "A gogo" in 2017. "MMM (Mouiller le maillot et mailler)", a soccer-themed song became a big hit for Naza with the inclusion of Brazilian Neymar and Ivory Coast player Serge Aurier. Naza also co-wrote "Bazardée", a hit for KeBlack in 2016 peaking at number seven on the French Singles Chart.

His debut album Incroyable in 2017 was certified gold. The follow-up album was C'est la loi in 2018 both on Bomayé Musik.

== Discography ==
=== Albums ===
Year	Album	Peak positions			Certification
Year	Album	FR	BEL (FL)	BEL (Wa)	Certification
2017	Incroyable	11	175	26	FRA: Gold
2018	C'est la loi	7	138	20	FRA: Gold
2019	Bénef	28	—	39	
2020	Gros bébé	3	98	48	FRA: Gold
2024	Nazaland	—	—	19	

=== Mixtapes ===
Year	Album	Peak positions	
Year	Album	FR	BEL (Wa)
2022	Big Daddy – Mixtape Vol. 1	9	71

=== EPs ===
Year	EP
2016	Tout pour la street

=== Singles ===
Year	Title	Peak positions				Album	Certification
Year	Title	FR	BEL (FL)	BEL (Wa)	SWI	Album	Certification
2017	"La débauche"	162	—	—	—		
2017	"A gogo"	133	—	—	—		
2017	"MMM (Mouiller le maillot et mailler)"	59	—	22 (Ultratip*)	—		
2018	"On t'a dit" (feat. KeBlack)	45	—	—	—		
2019	"Benef"	143	—	—	—		
2019	"Vodka" (with DJ Leska)	151	—	—	—		
2019	"Loin de moi"	5	—	17 (Ultratip*)	—		
2020	"Souris verte"	23	—	6 (Ultratip*)	—		
2020	"Jolie bébé" (feat. Niska)	2	35 (Ultratip*)	17	19	Gros bébé	
2021	"Ma play" (with KeBlack and Naps)	130	—	—	—	Non-album release	
2023	"1, 2, 3, Soleil" (with Nazakeblack and KeBlack)	16	—	—	—	Non-album release	

*Did not appear in the official Belgian Ultratop 50 charts, but rather in the bubbling under Ultratip charts.

=== Other charting songs ===
Year	Title	Peak positions	Album
Year	Title	FR	Album
2017	"Sac à dos"	124	
2017	"Va chercher" (feat. Ohmondieusalva)	182	
2017	"Sans problème"	147	
2017	"Moi je vérifie" (feat. Dadju & Aya Nakamura)	185	
2018	"Cadeaux" (with Aya Nakamura)	171	
2018	"Ça va" (feat. Alonzo)	92	
2018	"Remontada"	88	
2018	"P*tain de m*rde"	27	
2018	"Mon kiki"	158	
2018	"À midi" (feat. Ninho)	130	
2018	"Mon kiki" (feat. Ohmondieusalva)	102	
2018	"On t'a dit" (feat. Keblack)	45	
2019	"Jolie"	160	
2020	"Souris verte"	23	
2020	"La musique est bonne" (feat. Heuss l'Enfoiré)	97	
2020	"Faut pardonner"	29	Gros bébé
2020	"Folie"	63	Gros bébé
2020	"Symphonie du bendo" (feat. Heuss L'Enfoiré)	68	Gros bébé
2020	"Quand même" (feat. RK)	75	Gros bébé
2020	"Liquide"	85	Gros bébé
2020	"Mauvais" (feat. SCH)	89	Gros bébé
2020	"T'as pas idée"	97	Gros bébé
2020	"J'ai pas sommeil"	103	Gros bébé
2020	"C'est comme ça" (feat. KeBlack)	116	Gros bébé
2020	"Toi va là-bas"	122	Gros bébé
2020	"Je peux pas"	134	Gros bébé
2020	"Mytho"	161	Gros bébé
2020	"Ambulance"	162	Gros bébé
2020	"Parka"	176	Gros bébé
2020	"Bye Bye"	199	Gros bébé

=== Featured in ===
Year	Title	Peak positions		Album
Year	Title	FR	BEL (Wa)	Album
2016	"Com'dab" (DJ Kayz feat. KeBlack & Naza)	190	—	
2017	"Pourquoi chérie" (BMYE feat. Naza, KeBlack, Youssoupha, Hiro, Jaymax & DJ Myst)	44	43	
2017	"Mannequin" (Fally Ipupa feat. KeBlack & Naza)	163	—	Fally Ipupa album Tokooos
2017	"Casse la démarche" (DJ Babs feat. Keblack & Naza)	—	14 (Ultratip*)	
2017	"La danse du matin" (BMYE feat. Hiro, Naza, Jaymax, Youssoupha, KeBlack & DJ Myst)	177	9 (Ultratip*)	
2018	"Attache ta ceinture" (Lartiste feat. Naza)	75	—	
2018	"Équilibré" (KeBlack feat. feat. Bamby, Jahyanai & Naza)	170	1 (Ultratip*)	
2018	"Mignon garçon" (4Keus feat. Naza, Keblack & Dry)	107	—	
2018	"Lové" (MRC feat. Naza)	67	—	
2019	"Kitoko" (Eva feat. Keblack & Naza)	52	—	
2019	"Ma petite" (Gradur feat. Naza)	117	—	Gradur album Zone 59
2020	"Allez les gros" (Marwa Loud feat. Naza)	39	8 (Ultratip*)	
2020	"Boire et mousser" (Chily feat. Naza)	75	—	
2021	"Number One" (L'Algérino feat. Naza)	166	—	L'Agérino album Moonlight
2023	"Business" (Dystinct feat. Naza)	31	—	

*Did not appear in the official Belgian Ultratop 50 charts, but rather in the bubbling under Ultratip charts.
