= Actualite.cd =

Congolese media website

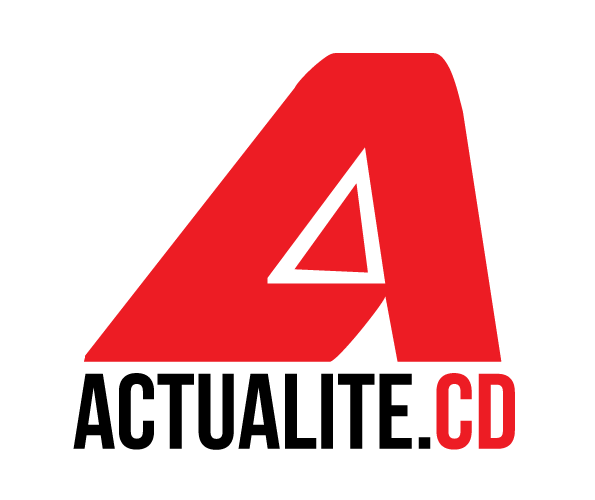
- Website type: news
- Available in: French
- Owner: Groupe Next Corp
- Editor: Patient Ligodi
- Website: actualite.cd
- Commercial: Yes
- Launched: 4 August 2016; 10 years ago
- Current status: Active

Actualite.cd is a Congolese media website specializing in political, security and economic information. It was launched in 2016 as part of Groupe Next Corp.

== Overview ==
Actualite.cd was created following the impromptu closure of Politico.cd, another political news website in the Democratic Republic of Congo. The website was launched on August 4, 2016, by the journalist Patient Ligodi, co-founder of Politico, with the aim of making a site more powerful, captivating, more responsive and more complete. It mainly deals with three headings, politics, economy and security.

The media employs more than fifty journalists covering the news throughout the Congolese territory and is the ninth most visited website in Democratic Republic of Congo according to Alexa Internet.

== Famous journalists ==
- Patient Ligodi : 2017 UNESCO/Guillermo Cano World Press Freedom Prize and Director of the Univers FM radio station
- Pascal Mulegwa : RFI and Agence France-Presse correspondent in the Democratic Republic of the Congo
- Prisca Lokale : 2019 JDH Prize (Journalists for Human Rights Prize)
- Stanis Bujakera Tshiamala : 2019 Patriotism gold medal by the New Dynamics of Civil Society
- Ange Kasongo : Writer and RFI and Agence France-Presse correspondent, author of the novel Les Femmes de Pakadjuma
