= Music in Africa Foundation =

Pan-African music non-profit organization

- Abbreviation: MIAF
- Formation: July 27, 2013; 12 years ago
- Type: Non-profit
- Legal status: Active
- Headquarters: Johannesburg, South Africa
- Region served: Africa
- Website: www.musicinafrica.net

The Music in Africa Foundation (MIAF) is a pan-African non-profit organization established to support the African music sector through information exchange, networking, and professional development. Headquartered in Johannesburg, South Africa, the foundation operates a regional information portal and organizes the annual Music in Africa Conference for Collaborations, Exchange and Showcases (ACCES).

== History ==
The Music in Africa initiative began in 2011 as a collaborative project between the Goethe-Institut and the Siemens Stiftung. The foundation was formally established on 27 July 2013 in Nairobi, Kenya, and officially registered as a non-profit organization in South Africa in February 2014. In 2015, the foundation launched its full-scale online portal, which serves as a directory for artists, service providers, and industry professionals across the continent.

In 2021, the Music in Africa Foundation conducted nationwide research in South Africa examining the various revenue streams available to music creators. The study, published as the Revenue Streams for Music Creators in South Africa 2022 report, surveyed approximately 3,000 musicians across all nine provinces to assess earnings and income distribution across multiple sources, including live performances, services, grants and funding, brand-related activities, and music rights. According to the findings, the average South African music creator earned a monthly income of R9,890, with total reported earnings across all streams amounting to R141,568,500. Grants and funding contributed the largest proportion of average monthly revenue, followed by live performances, brand-related revenue, services, and music rights. The report was part of the foundation’s pilot phase of its Revenue Streams for African Musicians (RSFAM) project, intended to provide data and insights about financial sustainability in the music industry.

== Activities ==
=== Music in Africa portal ===
The foundation maintains a multilingual web magazine portal (English and French) that provides industry news, educational resources, and a directory of over 50,000 music professionals. It acts as a repository for historical and contemporary information on African music genres and scenes.

=== ACCES Conference ===
The Music in Africa Conference for Collaborations, Exchange and Showcases (ACCES) is the foundation's flagship trade event. Launched in 2017 in Dakar, Senegal, the conference moves to a different African city annually. The event includes panel discussions, networking sessions, and live showcases for export-ready talent.

Year | City | Country
2017	Dakar	Senegal
2018	Nairobi	Kenya
2019	Accra	Ghana
2021	Johannesburg	South Africa
2022/23	Dar es Salaam	Tanzania
2024	Kigali	Rwanda
2025	Tshwane	South Africa

=== Grant Programs ===
The foundation administers various funding initiatives, including the Sound Connects Fund, supported by the European Union and the Organization of African, Caribbean and Pacific States (OACPS). The fund provides financial support to creative organizations in Southern Africa.

=== Honours and Recognition ===
In November 2019, the Music in Africa Foundation recognized Ghanaian musicians Ebo Taylor and Bibie Brew during the Music in Africa Conference for Collaborations, Exchange and Showcases (ACCES), held in Accra, Ghana. The recognition formed part of the foundation’s activities at the conference and was presented in acknowledgement of the artists’ contributions to African music. The event was attended by music professionals, artists, and stakeholders from across the continent and beyond, and featured performances, panel discussions, and networking sessions associated with the ACCES conference program.

== Partnerships ==
In January 2025, the foundation formalized a partnership with the African Union Commission to advance the implementation of the AU Plan of Action on Cultural and Creative Industries. MIAF also collaborates with UNESCO on initiatives such as JazzWomenAfrica, which focuses on gender equality in the music sector.

== Governance ==
The foundation is governed by a pan-African board of directors. Maimouna Dembélé served as chairperson for two terms, succeeded by Marcus Tawanda Gora in 2022.

The Music in Africa Foundation is led by its founding executive director, Eddie Hatitye. In a 2025 interview with GQ South Africa, Hatitye discussed the foundation’s work in providing information, training, and industry convenings for music professionals in Africa, including its organisation of the annual Music in Africa Conference for Collaborations, Exchange and Showcases (ACCES). He also commented on structural challenges facing the African music sector, such as access to infrastructure, skills development, and income generation.
