= KeBlack =

French rapper (born 1992)

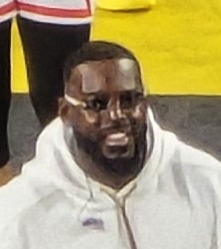

Background information
- Born: Cédric Matéta Nkomi; 30 January 1992 (age 34); Creil, France
- Genre: Hip hop
- Occupations: Rapper, singer
- Years active: 2015–present
- Label: Bomayé Musik

Cédric Matéta Nkomi (born 30 January 1992), known professionally as KeBlack, is a French rapper and singer of Congolese origin. He is signed to the record label Bomayé.

== Career ==
Youssoupha and his record label Bomayé Musik (part of Universal Music) signed him with his release "J'ai déconné", which became a hit in 2015. He became more famous with the certified diamond "Bazardée" which has 265 million views on YouTube ( as of November 2026). Encouraged by its success, he launched a new musical project, the album Premier étage, released on 27 January 2017. The album was certified gold. The follow-up album Appartement 105 was released on 11 May 2018.

== Discography ==
=== Albums ===
| Year | Title | Peak positions | | | | Certification |
| Year | Title | FRA | BEL (Fl) | BEL (Wa) | SWI | Certification |
|---|---|---|---|---|---|---|
| 2015 | Tout va bien (#TVB) | 128 | — | — | — | |
| 2017 | Premier étage | 7 | 160 | 9 | 47 | |
| 2018 | Appartement 105 | 15 | — | 49 | — | |
| 2021 | Contrôle | 16 | — | 111 | — | |
| 2024 | Focus | 9 | — | 6 | 23 | |

=== Singles ===
| Year | Title | Peak positions | | Album |
| Year | Title | FRA | BEL (Wa) | Album |
|---|---|---|---|---|
| 2015 | "Tout va bien" | 104 | — | Tout va bien |
| 2016 | "J'ai déconné" | 30 | — | Premier étage |
| 2016 | "T'es à moi" | 161 | — | Premier étage |
| 2016 | "Bazardée" | 7 | 23 | Premier étage |
| 2017 | "Premier étage" | 59 | 22 (Ultratip)* | Premier étage |
| 2017 | "Vendeurs de rêves" | 193 | — | Non-album releases |
| 2018 | "Sans nouvelles" | — | 8* (Ultratip) | Non-album releases |
| 2019 | "Ne m'en veux pas" | 60 | — | Non-album releases |
| 2019 | "Tchop" | 51 | — | Non-album releases |
| 2020 | "Je fais ma vie" (with Ninho) | 72 | — | Contrôle |
| 2021 | "Ma play" (with Naza and Naps) | 130 | — | Non-album releases |
| 2021 | "Billets mauves" | 131 | — | Non-album releases |
| 2023 | "1, 2, 3, soleil" (with Nazakeblack and Naza) | 16 | — | Non-album releases |
| 2023 | "Laisse moi" | 2 | 26 | Focus |
| 2024 | "Aucune attache" | 10 | 27 | Focus |
| 2024 | "Boucan" (with Franglish) | 1 | 23 | Focus |
| 2024 | "Bababa" | 64 | — | Focus |
| 2025 | "Mood" | 3 | 12 | Focus |
| 2025 | "Melrose Place" (with Guy2Bezbar) | 4 | 16 | Non-album singles |
| 2025 | "Génération impolie" (with Franglish) | 5 | 15 | Non-album singles |

*Did not appear in the official Belgian Ultratop 50 charts, but rather in the bubbling under Ultratip charts.

=== Other charting songs ===
| Year | Title | Peak positions | | Album |
| Year | Title | FRA | BEL (Wa) | Album |
|---|---|---|---|---|
| 2017 | "Walou" (feat. Niska) | 118 | — | Premier étage |
| 2017 | "L'histoire d'une guitare" | 133 | — | Premier étage |
| 2017 | "Enfants d'Afrique" (feat. Dadju) | 162 | — | Premier étage |
| 2017 | "Bercé par la street" | 178 | — | Premier étage |
| 2017 | "Dinguerie" | 192 | — | Premier étage |
| 2018 | "Complètement sonné" | 17 | 20 (Ultratip)* | Appartement 105 |
| 2018 | "Équilibré" (feat. feat. Bamby, Jahyanai & Naza) | 170 | 1 (Ultratip)* | Appartement 105 |
| 2018 | "Menteuse" | 186 | — | Appartement 105 |
| 2025 | "Touché (with Gims) | 18 | 47 | |

*Did not appear in the official Belgian Ultratop 50 charts, but rather in the bubbling under Ultratip charts.

=== Featured in ===
| Year | Title | Peak positions | | Album |
| Year | Title | FRA | BEL (Wa) | Album |
|---|---|---|---|---|
| 2015 | "Cette vie m'emporte" (Ayna feat. Keblack) | 97 | 7 (Ultratip)* | |
| 2016 | "Com'dab" (DJ Kayz feat. Keblack & Naza) | 190 | — | |
| 2016 | "En altitude" (DJ E-Rise feat. Mister You & Keblack) | — | — | |
| 2017 | "Pourquoi chérie" (BMYE feat. Naza, Keblack, Youssoupha, Hiro, Jaymax & DJ Myst) | 24 | 43 | |
| 2017 | "Mélanger" (Kalash Criminel feat. Keblack) | 191 | — | |
| 2017 | "Mannequin" (Fally Ipupa feat. Keblack & Naza) | 163 | — | |
| 2017 | "Casse la démarche" (DJ Babs feat. Keblack & Naza) | — | 14 (Ultratip)* | |
| 2017 | "Orphelin" (Aya Nakamura feat. Keblack) | 151 | — | |
| 2017 | "Trouvez la moi" (Dadju feat. Keblack & Fally Ipupa) | 95 | — | |
| 2017 | "La danse du matin" (BMYE feat. Hiro, Naza, Jaymax, Youssoupha, Keblack & DJ Myst) | 177 | 9 (Ultratip)* | |
| 2018 | "Mignon garçon" (4Keus feat. Naza, Keblack & Dry) | 107 | — | |
| 2018 | "Plus rien" (Franglish feat. Keblack) | 185 | — | |
| 2018 | "On t'a dit" (Naza feat. Keblack) | 45 | — | |
| 2020 | "C'est comme ça" (Naza feat. Keblack) | 116 | — | Naza album Gros bébé |
| 2024 | "Shavo" (Heuss l'Enfoiré feat. Keblack) | 67 | — | |

*Did not appear in the official Belgian Ultratop 50 charts, but rather in the bubbling under Ultratip charts.
