= List of best-selling singles in Germany =

Germany is the third largest music market in the world and the second largest in Europe.

This is a list of the best-selling singles in Germany, some of which have been certified by the Bundesverband Musikindustrie (BVMI). Since June 1, 2014, BVMI certifies a single platinum for the download or shipment of 400,000 copies across Germany.

Certifications for singles released in Germany depend upon their release date.

== Gold and Platinum certification awards (Timeline) ==
Certification	1974–1984	Before January 1, 2003	January 1, 2003 to June 1, 2014	June 1, 2014 to June 29, 2023	After June 29, 2023
Silver	500,000	—	—	—	—
Gold	1,000,000	250,000	150,000	200,000	300,000
Platinum	2,000,000	500,000	300,000	400,000	600,000
Diamond	—	—	—	1,000,000	1,500,000

== Best-selling singles in Germany ==
Sortable table
Year	Title	Artist	Certification	Shipments (Sales)
1997	"Candle in the Wind 1997"	Elton John	9× Platinum	4.5 million
1957	"The River Kwai March"	Mitch Miller	—	(4 million)
1997	"Time To Say Goodbye"	Andrea Bocelli feat. Sarah Brightman	11× Gold	3 million
2013	"Atemlos durch die Nacht"	Helene Fischer	4× Platinum^{‡}	2.4 million
2017	"Shape of You"	Ed Sheeran	6× Platinum^{‡}	2.4 million
1997	"I'll Be Missing You"	Puff Daddy feat. Faith Evans and 112	3× Platinum & 3× Gold^{‡}	2.25 million
1999	"Mambo No. 5"	Lou Bega	7× Gold^{‡}	2.1 million
1958	"Der lachende Vagabund"	Fred Bertelmann	—	(2 million)
1963	"Junge, komm bald wieder"	Freddy Quinn	—	2 million
1965	"Il Silenzio"	Nini Rosso	—	2 million
1971	"Butterfly"	Danyel Gérard	—	(2 million)
1967	"Massachusetts"	Bee Gees	—	(2 million)
1978	"Rivers of Babylon"	Boney M	Platinum	2 million
1998	"My Heart Will Go On"	Celine Dion	4× Platinum	2 million
2017	"Despacito"	Luis Fonsi & Daddy Yankee	9× Gold+Gold^{‡}	2 million
1964	"Vergangen vergessen vorüber"	Freddy Quinn	—	(1.8 million)
1994	"All I Want for Christmas Is You"	Mariah Carey	3× Platinum^{‡}	1.8 million
2001	"In the End"	Linkin Park	3× Platinum^{‡}	1.8 million
1992	"Conquest of Paradise"	Vangelis	3× Platinum	1.7 million
2013	"Wake Me Up"	Avicii	11× Gold^{‡}	1.65 million
2019	“Another Love”	Tom Odell	11× Gold^{‡}	1.65 million
1972	“Ich hab’ die Liebe geseh’n”	Vicky Leandros	—	1.5 million
1985	"Last Christmas"	Wham!	3× Platinum^{‡}	1.5 million
1998	"Flugzeuge im Bauch"	Oli. P	3× Platinum	1.5 million
2000	"Last Resort"	Papa Roach	5× Gold‡	1.5 million
2015	"Faded"	Alan Walker	7× Gold^{‡}	1.4 million
2017	"Perfect"	Ed Sheeran	7× Gold^{‡}	1.4 million
2018	"In My Mind"	Dynoro & Gigi D'Agostino	7× Gold^{‡}	1.4 million
2017	"Was du Liebe nennst"	Bausa	7× Gold^{‡}	1.4 million
2019	“Dance Monkey”	Tones and I	7× Gold^{‡}	1.4 million
2013	"Happy"	Pharrell Williams	9× Gold^{‡}	1.35 million
1998	"Believe"	Cher	5× Gold	1.25 million
1999	"Blue (Da Ba Dee)"	Eiffel 65	5× Gold	1.25 million
1983	"Billie Jean"	Michael Jackson	2× Platinum^{‡}	1.2 million
1991	"Smells Like Teen Spirit"	Nirvana	2× Platinum^{‡}	1.2 million
2007	"Ein Stern (...der deinen Namen trägt)"	DJ Ötzi feat. Nik P.	4× Platinum	1.2 million
2008	"Poker Face"	Lady Gaga	4× Platinum^{‡}	1.2 million
2011	"Titanium"	David Guetta ft. Sia	2× Platinum^{‡}	1.2 million
2012	"Scream & Shout"	Britney Spears	4× Platinum^{‡}	1.2 million
2012	"Radioactive"	Imagine Dragons	4× Platinum^{‡}	1.2 million
2017	"Rockstar"	Post Malone feat. 21 Savage	3× Platinum^{‡}	1.2 million
2010	"Waka Waka (This Time for Africa)"	Shakira	4× Platinum^{‡}	1.2 million
2011	"Somebody That I Used to Know"	Gotye feat. Kimbra	4× Platinum^{‡}	1.2 million
2013	"I See Fire"	Ed Sheeran	Diamond^{‡}	1.2 million
2013	"Blurred Lines"	Robin Thicke feat. T.I. and Pharrell Williams	4× Platinum^{‡}	1.2 million
2014	"Cheerleader (Felix Jaehn Remix)"	Omi	4× Platinum^{‡}	1.2 million
2017	"More Than You Know"	Axwell & Ingrosso	3× Platinum^{‡}	1.2 million
2017	"Unforgettable"	French Montana feat. Swae Lee	3× Platinum^{‡}	1.2 million
2017	"Something Just Like This"	The Chainsmokers & Coldplay	3× Platinum^{‡}	1.2 million
2023	"Flowers"	Miley Cyrus	2× Platinum^{‡}	1.2 million
2001	"I Believe"	Bro'Sis	2× Platinum	1.14 million
1974	“Theo wir fahr’n nach Lodz”	Vicky Leandros	—	1.10 million
1963	"Ich will ’nen Cowboy als Mann"	Gitte	—	(1.05 million)
2003	"Numb"	Linkin Park	7× Gold^{‡}	1.05 million
2009	"Alors on danse"	Stromae	7× Gold^{‡}	1.05 million
2013	"Take Me to Church"	Hozier	7× Gold^{‡}	1.05 million
1956	"Heimweh"	Freddy Quinn	—	(1 million+)
1958	"Heimatlos"	Freddy Quinn	—	(1 million)
1958	"La paloma"	Billy Vaughn and his Orchestra	—	(1 million)
1958	"Sail Along Sil'vry Moon"	Billy Vaughn and his Orchestra	—	(1 million)
1959	"Die Gitarre und das Meer"	Freddy Quinn	—	(1 million)
1960	"Unter fremden Sternen"	Freddy Quinn	—	(1 million)
1960	"Banjo Boy"	Jan and Kjeld	—	(1 million)
1960	"It's Now or Never"	Elvis Presley	Gold	1 million
1960	"Marina"	Rocco Granata	—	(1 million)
1960	"Ramona"	Blue Diamonds	—	(1 million)
1960	"Wir wollen niemals auseinandergehn"	Heidi Brühl	—	(1 million)
1961	"La paloma"	Freddy Quinn	—	(1 million)
1961	"Weisse Rosen aus Athen"	Nana Mouskouri	—	(1 million)
1961	"Wheels"	Billy Vaughn and his Orchestra	—	(1 million)
1962	"Tanze mit mir in den Morgen"	Gerhard Wendland	—	(1 million)
1964	"Do Wah Diddy Diddy"	Manfred Mann	—	1 million
1964	"Liebeskummer Lohnt Sich Nicht"	Siw Malmkvist	—	(1 million)
1965	"Yesterday Man"	Chris Andrews	—	(1 million)
1966	"Ganz in Weiß"	Roy Black	—	(1 million)
1969	"Looky, Looky"	Giorgio	Gold	1 million
1969	"Dein schönstes Geschenk"	Roy Black	—	(1 million)
1969	"Mendocino"	Michael Holm	—	(1 million)
1970	"Chirpy Chirpy Cheep Cheep"	Middle of the Road	—	1 million
1970	"El Cóndor Pasa"	Simon & Garfunkel	—	1 million
1970	"Du"	Peter Maffay	—	(1 million)
1972	"Un canto a Galici"	Julio Iglesias	—	1 million
1972	"I'd Love You to Want Me"	Lobo	—	1 million
1972	"Ich hab dich lieb"	Michael Schanze	—	(1 million)
1975	"Una paloma blanca"	George Baker Selection	—	(1 million)
1978	"Mary's Boy Child / Oh My Lord"	Boney M	Gold^{‡}	1 million
1978	"The Smurf Song"	Father Abraham	Platinum	1 million
1978	"Y.M.C.A."	Village People	Gold	1 million
1979	"A Walk in the Park"	Nick Straker Band	—	(1 million)
1979	"Sun of Jamaica"	Goombay Dance Band	Platinum	1 million
1989	"Lambada"	Kaoma	2× Platinum	1 million
1993	"Over the Rainbow"	Israel Kamakawiwoʻole	2× Platinum	1 million
1993	"What's Up?"	4 Non Blondes	2× Platinum	1 million
1994	"Cotton Eye Joe"	Rednex	2× Platinum	1 million
1995	"Earth Song"	Michael Jackson	2× Platinum	1 million
1995	"Gangsta's Paradise"	Coolio feat. L.V.	2× Platinum	1 million
1996	"Die längste Single der Welt"	Wolfgang Petry	2× Platinum	1 million
1996	"Killing Me Softly"	Fugees	2× Platinum	1 million
1998	"Ein Schwein namens Männer"	Die Ärzte	2× Platinum	1 million
1999	"Anton aus Tirol"	Anton feat. DJ Ötzi	2× Platinum	1 million
2003	"Last Resort"	Papa Roach	2× Platinum^{‡}	1 million
2002	"Der Steuersong"	Die Gerd-Show	2× Platinum	1 million
2002	"The Ketchup Song"	Las Ketchup	2× Platinum	1 million
2002	"All the Things She Said"	t.A.T.u.	2× Platinum^{‡}	1 million
2012	"Lila Wolken"	Marteria, Yasha & Miss Platnum	Diamond^{‡}	1 million
2013	"Take Me to Church"	Hozier	Diamond^{‡}	1 million
2013	"Timber"	Pitbull feat. Kesha	Diamond^{‡}	1 million
2013	"Willst du"	Alligatoah	Diamond^{‡}	1 million
2014	"Au Revoir"	Mark Forster feat. Sido	Diamond	1 million
2014	"Are You with Me"	Lost Frequencies	Diamond	1 million
2014	"Auf uns"	Andreas Bourani	Diamond^{‡}	1 million
2014	"Prayer in C (Robin Schulz Remix)"	Lilly Wood and the Prick	Diamond^{‡}	1 million
2014	"Traum"	Cro	Diamond^{‡}	1 million
2014	"Waves (Robin Schulz Remix)"	Mr. Probz	Diamond^{‡}	1 million
2015	"Ain't Nobody"	Felix Jaehn feat. Jasmine Thompson	Diamond^{‡}	1 million
2015	"Die immer lacht"	Stereoact feat. Kerstin Ott	Diamond^{‡}	1 million
2015	"Don't Be So Shy" (Filatov & Karas remix)	Imany	Diamond^{‡}	1 million
2015	"Geiles Leben"	Glasperlenspiel	Diamond^{‡}	1 million
2015	"Hulapalu"	Andreas Gabalier	Diamond^{‡}	1 million
2015	"Love Yourself"	Justin Bieber	Diamond^{‡}	1 million
2015	"Photograph"	Ed Sheeran	Diamond^{‡}	1 million
2015	"See You Again"	Wiz Khalifa feat. Charlie Puth	Diamond^{‡}	1 million
2015	"So wie du bist"	MoTrip feat. Lary	Diamond^{‡}	1 million
2015	"Sugar"	Robin Schulz feat. Francesco Yates	Diamond^{‡}	1 million
2015	"Stressed Out"	Twenty One Pilots	Diamond^{‡}	1 million
2015	"The Sound of Silence"	Disturbed	Diamond^{‡}	1 million
2016	"Can't Stop the Feeling!"	Justin Timberlake	Diamond^{‡}	1 million
2016	"Cheap Thrills"	Sia feat. Sean Paul	Diamond^{‡}	1 million
2016	"Don't Let Me Down"	The Chainsmokers feat. Daya	Diamond^{‡}	1 million
2016	"Ohne mein Team"	Bonez MC & RAF Camora feat. Maxwell	Diamond^{‡}	1 million
2016	"Palmen aus Plastik"	Bonez MC & RAF Camora	Diamond^{‡}	1 million
2017	"Havana"	Camila Cabello feat. Young Thug	Diamond^{‡}	1 million
2017	"Old Town Road"	Lil Nas X	Diamond^{‡}	1 million
2017	"Señorita"	Kay One feat. Pietro Lombardi	Diamond^{‡}	1 million
2017	"Thunder"	Imagine Dragons	Diamond^{‡}	1 million
2018	"500 PS"	Bonez MC & RAF Camora	Diamond^{‡}	1 million
2018	"Someone You Loved"	Lewis Capaldi	Diamond^{‡}	1 million
2019	"Bad Guy"	Billie Eilish	Diamond^{‡}	1 million
2019	"Blinding Lights"	The Weeknd	Diamond^{‡}	1 million
2019	"Roller"	Apache 207	Diamond^{‡}	1 million
2020	"Heat Waves"	Glass Animals	Diamond^{‡}	1 million
2021	"Bad Habits"	Ed Sheeran	Diamond^{‡}	1 million

^{†} The BVMI also separately certified the Justin Bieber remix Gold.

== Notes ==
- ^{‡}Certification include on-demand audio and video streams and track sale equivalent

== See also ==
- List of best-selling albums in Germany
