= Helene Fischer discography =

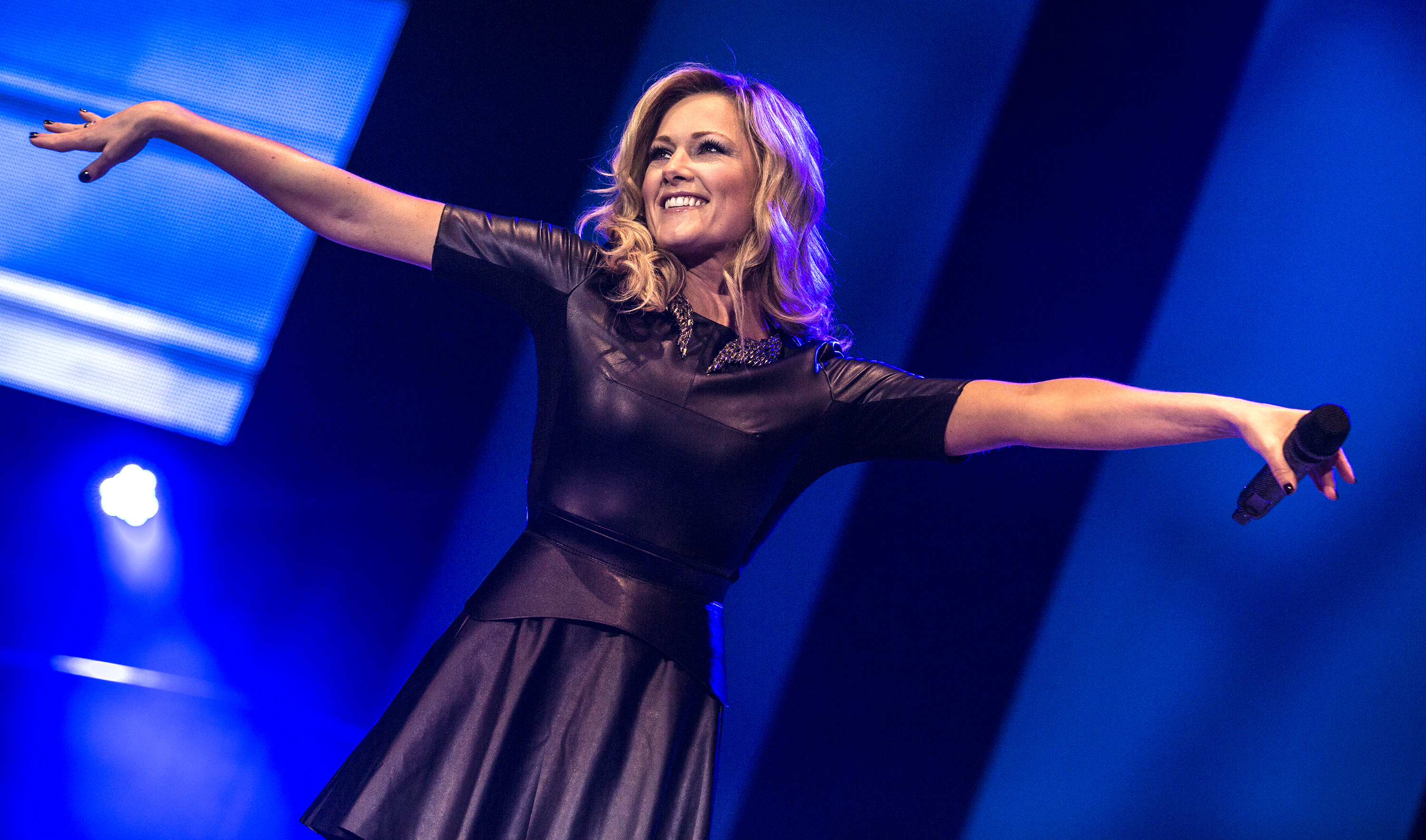
- Fischer in concert
- Studio albums: 13
- Live albums: 9
- Compilation albums: 5
- Singles: 46
- Video albums: 9
- Music videos: 21

German singer Helene Fischer has released twelve studio albums, nine live albums, five compilation albums and 42 singles.

== Albums ==
=== Studio albums ===
List of studio albums, with selected chart positions, sales figures and certifications
| Title | Album details | Peak chart positions | | | | | | Certifications |
| Title | Album details | GER | AUT | BEL (Fl) | DEN | NLD | SWI | Certifications |
|---|---|---|---|---|---|---|---|---|
| Von hier bis unendlich | Released: 2 February 2006; Label: EMI; Format: CD, digital download | 19 | 16 | — | — | — | 49 | BVMI: 5× Gold; IFPI AUT: Platinum |
| So nah wie du | Released: 29 June 2007; Label: EMI; Format: CD, CD/DVD, digital download | 5 | 7 | — | — | — | 45 | BVMI: 5× Gold; IFPI AUT: Platinum; IFPI SWI: Gold |
| Zaubermond | Released: 27 June 2008; Label: EMI; Format: CD, CD/DVD, digital download | 2 | 4 | — | — | — | 17 | BVMI: 2× Platinum; IFPI AUT: 2× Platinum; IFPI SWI: Gold |
| So wie ich bin | Released: 9 October 2009; Label: EMI; Format: CD, CD/DVD, digital download | 2 | 1 | — | — | — | 7 | BVMI: 3× Gold; IFPI AUT: Platinum; IFPI SWI: Gold |
| Für einen Tag | Released: 14 October 2011; Label: EMI; Format: CD, CD/DVD, digital download | 1 | 2 | 7 | 19 | 1 | 2 | BVMI: 4× Platinum; IFPI AUT: 3× Platinum; IFPI SWI: Gold |
| Farbenspiel | Released: 4 October 2013; Label: Polydor; Format: CD, CD/DVD, CD/Blu-ray, digital download | 1 | 1 | 14 | 4 | 8 | 1 | BVMI: 13× Platinum; IFPI AUT: 18× Platinum; IFPI SWI: 4× Platinum |
| Weihnachten (with Royal Philharmonic Orchestra) | Released: 13 November 2015; Label: Polydor; Format: CD, DVD, Blu-ray, vinyl, digital download | 1 | 1 | 12 | 8 | 22 | 2 | BVMI: 6× Platinum; IFPI AUT: 8× Platinum; IFPI SWI: 2× Platinum |
| Helene Fischer | Released: 12 May 2017; Label: Polydor; Format: CD, digital download | 1 | 1 | 5 | 13 | 6 | 1 | BVMI: 5× Platinum; IFPI AUT: 6× Platinum; IFPI SWI: 2× Platinum |
| Rausch | Released: 15 October 2021; Label: Polydor; Format: CD, digital download | 1 | 1 | 8 | — | 7 | 1 | BVMI: 2× Platinum; IFPI AUT: 2× Platinum; IFPI SWI: Gold |
| Die schönsten Kinderlieder | Released: 1 November 2024; Label: Polydor; Format: CD, digital download | 2 | 1 | — | — | — | 3 | |
| Die schönsten Kinderlieder – Tanzen & Feiern | Released: 12 September 2025; Label: Polydor; Format: CD, digital download | 9 | 10 | — | — | — | 27 | |
| Die schönsten Kinderlieder – Winter- und Weihnachtszeit | Released: 12 November 2025; Label: Polydor; Format: CD, digital download | 5 | 7 | — | — | — | 19 | |
| Wir | Scheduled: 4 December 2026; Label: Polydor; Format: CD, digital download, Vinyl | — | — | — | — | — | — | |
"—" denotes a title that did not chart, or was not released in that territory.

=== Compilation albums ===
List of compilation albums, with selected chart positions, sales figures and certifications
| Title | Album details | Peak chart positions | | | | | | Certifications |
| Title | Album details | GER | AUT | BEL (Fl) | DEN | NLD | SWI | Certifications |
|---|---|---|---|---|---|---|---|---|
| Best of Helene Fischer | Released: 4 June 2010; Label: EMI; Format: CD, digital download | 2 | 1 | 19 | 5 | 85 | 4 | BVMI: 10× Platinum; IFPI AUT: 9× Platinum; IFPI SWI: Gold |
| The English Ones | Released: 16 July 2010; Label: EMI; Format: CD, digital download | — | — | — | — | — | — | |
| Best of Live – Die schönsten Live-Momente | Released: 25 October 2014; Label: Polydor/Island; Format: CD, digital download | — | — | — | — | — | — | |
| Die Helene Fischer Show – Meine schönsten Momente (Vol. 1) | Released: 11 December 2020; Label: Polydor; Format: CD, digital download | 1 | 4 | 17 | — | 18 | 2 | |
| Das ultimative Best Of | Released: 12 May 2023; Label: Polydor; Format: CD, digital download | 4 | — | 19 | — | 51 | — | |
"—" denotes a title that did not chart, or was not released in that territory.

=== Live albums ===
List of live albums, with selected chart positions
| Title | Album details | Peak chart positions | | | | |
| Title | Album details | GER | AUT | BEL (Fl) | NLD | SWI |
|---|---|---|---|---|---|---|
| iTunes Live aus München | Released: 23 October 2009; Label: EMI; Format: Digital download | — | — | — | — | — |
| Best of Helene Fischer Live: So wie ich bin | Released: 10 December 2010; Label: EMI; Format: CD, digital download | 2 | 16 | 34 | — | 27 |
| Für einen Tag: Live 2012 | Released: 14 December 2012; Label: EMI; Format: CD, digital download | 1 | 6 | 82 | 83 | 22 |
| Farbenspiel: Live aus dem Deutschen Theater München | Released: 15 November 2013; Label: Polydor; Format: CD, CD/DVD, CD/Blu-ray, digital download | — | — | — | — | — |
| Das Konzert aus dem Kesselhaus | Released: 8 September 2017; Label: Polydor; Format: CD, CD/DVD, CD/Blu-ray, digital download | — | — | 75 | 93 | — |
| Helene Fischer Live – Die Arena-Tournee | Released: 27 April 2018; Label: Polydor; Format: CD, CD/DVD, CD/Blu-ray, digital download | — | — | 18 | — | — |
| Helene Fischer Live – Die Stadion-Tour | Released: 23 August 2019; Label: Polydor; Format: CD, CD/DVD, CD/Blu-ray, digital download | 1 | 4 | 69 | — | 4 |
| Rausch Live – Das größte Konzert ungekürzt live aus München | Released: 21 October 2022; Label: Polydor; Format: CD, CD/DVD, CD/Blu-ray, digital download | — | — | 12 | 47 | — |
| Rausch Live – die Arena Tour | Released: 26 January 2024; Label: Polydor; Format: CD, CD/DVD, CD/Blu-ray, digital download | — | — | 184 | — | — |
"—" denotes a title that did not chart, or was not released in that territory.

== Singles ==
List of singles, with selected chart positions and certifications, showing year released and album name
| Title | Year | Peak chart positions | | | | Certifications | Album |
| Title | Year | GER | AUT | BEL (Fl) | SWI | Certifications | Album |
|---|---|---|---|---|---|---|---|
| "Feuer am Horizont" | 2006 | — | — | — | — | | Von hier bis unendlich |
| "Von hier bis unendlich" | 2006 | — | — | — | — | | Von hier bis unendlich |
| "Im Reigen der Gefühle" | 2006 | — | — | — | — | | Von hier bis unendlich |
| "Mitten im Paradies" | 2007 | 79 | — | — | — | | So nah wie du |
| "Du fängst mich auf und lässt mich fliegen" | 2007 | — | — | — | — | | So nah wie du |
| "Du hast mein Herz berührt" | 2007 | — | — | — | — | | So nah wie du |
| "Ich glaub dir hundert Lügen" | 2008 | — | — | — | — | | So nah wie du |
| "Lass mich in dein Leben" | 2008 | 38 | — | — | — | | Zaubermond |
| "Mal ganz ehrlich" | 2008 | — | — | — | — | | Zaubermond |
| "Ich geb nie auf (Am Anfang war das Feuer)" | 2008 | — | — | — | — | | Zaubermond |
| "Vergeben, vergessen und wieder vertrau'n" | 2009 | — | — | — | — | | Zaubermond |
| "Ich will immer wieder… dieses Fieber spür’n" | 2009 | 30 | 29 | 12 | 55 | BVMI: Gold; IFPI AUT: Platinum | So wie ich bin |
| "Du lässt mich sein, so wie Ich bin" | 2009 | — | — | — | — | | So wie ich bin |
| "Hundert Prozent" | 2010 | — | — | — | — | | So wie ich bin |
| "Nicht von dieser Welt" | 2010 | — | — | — | — | | Best of Helene Fischer |
| "Von Null auf Sehnsucht" | 2010 | — | — | — | — | | Best of Helene Fischer |
| "Sweet Surrender" | 2010 | — | — | — | — | | The English Ones |
| "Manchmal kommt die Liebe einfach so" | 2011 | — | — | — | — | | Best of Helene Fischer |
| "Phänomen" | 2011 | 49 | — | — | 71 | BVMI: Gold | Für einen Tag |
| "Wär heut mein letzter Tag" | 2011 | — | — | — | — | | Für einen Tag |
| "Die Hölle morgen früh" | 2012 | 68 | 74 | — | — | BVMI: Gold; IFPI AUT: Gold | Für einen Tag |
| "Nur wer den Wahnsinn liebt" | 2012 | — | — | — | — | | Für einen Tag |
| "Die Biene Maja" | 2013 | 78 | — | — | — | | Best of Helene Fischer (Tchibo-Edition) |
| "Fehlerfrei" | 2013 | 20 | 24 | 71 | 41 | BVMI: Gold; IFPI AUT: Gold | Farbenspiel |
| "Atemlos durch die Nacht" | 2013 | 3 | 1 | 26 | 2 | BVMI: Diamond; IFPI AUT: 6× Platinum; IFPI SWI: Platinum | Farbenspiel |
| "Marathon" | 2014 | 27 | 16 | — | — | | Farbenspiel |
| "Fröhliche Weihnacht überall" (with Royal Philharmonic Orchestra) | 2015 | 67 | — | — | — | | Weihnachten |
| "Rudolph, the Red-Nosed Reindeer" | 2015 | 88 | 72 | — | — | | Weihnachten |
| "The Power of Love" | 2015 | — | — | — | — | | Weihnachten |
| "Herzbeben" | 2017 | 6 | 23 | 27 | 16 | BVMI: Platinum; IFPI AUT: 2× Platinum | Helene Fischer |
| "Nur mit dir" | 2017 | 34 | 56 | — | 52 | BVMI: Gold; IFPI AUT: Gold | Helene Fischer |
| "Achterbahn" | 2017 | 10 | 37 | — | 25 | BVMI: Platinum; IFPI AUT: Platinum | Helene Fischer |
| "Flieger" | 2018 | 19 | — | — | 12 | | Helene Fischer |
| "Regenbogenfarben" (with Kerstin Ott) | 2018 | 20 | — | — | — | IFPI AUT: 4× Platinum | Non-album single |
| "Vamos a Marte" (featuring Luis Fonsi) | 2021 | 2 | 10 | — | 7 | BVMI: Gold; IFPI AUT: Gold | Rausch |
| "Volle Kraft voraus" | 2021 | 61 | — | — | — | | Rausch |
| "Null auf 100" | 2021 | 23 | 74 | — | 57 | | Rausch |
| "Jetzt oder nie" | 2022 | — | — | — | — | | Rausch |
| "Liebe ist ein Tanz" / "Blitz" | 2022 | — | — | — | — | | Rausch |
| "Wenn alles durchdreht" | 2022 | — | — | — | — | | Rausch |
| "Atemlos durch die Nacht" (10 Year Anniversary Version) (featuring Shirin David) | 2023 | 1 | — | — | 14 | | Non-album single |
| "Schau mal herein" (with Florian Silbereisen) | 2024 | 20 | 25 | — | — | | Non-album single |
| "Heute Nacht" | 2026 | 1 | 24 | — | — | | Wir |
| "An meiner Seite" | 2026 | 2 | 20 | — | — | | Wir |
| "Warum" | 2026 | 11 | 43 | — | — | | Wir |
| "Was hast du mit mir gemacht" | 2026 | — | — | — | — | | Wir |
"—" denotes items which were not released in that country or failed to chart.

== Other charted songs ==
List of songs, with selected chart positions, showing year released and album name
| Title | Year | Peak chart positions | | | Certifications | Album |
| Title | Year | GER | AUT | SWI | Certifications | Album |
|---|---|---|---|---|---|---|
| "Und morgen früh küss ich dich wach" | 2006 | 83 | — | 61 | BVMI: Gold | Von hier bis unendlich |
| "Mit keinem andern" | 2013 | 72 | 55 | — | BVMI: Gold | Farbenspiel |
| "Winter Wonderland" (with Royal Philharmonic Orchestra) | 2025 | 55 | 26 | — | | Weihnachten |

== Guest appearances ==
List of guest appearances with other performing artists, showing year released and album name
| Title | Year | Other performer(s) | Album |
|---|---|---|---|
| "How Am I Supposed to Live Without You" | 2011 | Michael Bolton | Gems: The Duets Collection |
| "The Prayer" | 2011 | Michael Bolton | Gems: The Duets Collection |
| "Make You Feel My Love" | 2011 | Michael Bolton | Gems: The Duets Collection |
| "Vivo per lei" | 2011 | Michael Bolton | Gems: The Duets Collection |
| "When I Fall in Love" | 2013 | Andrea Bocelli | Passione |
| "Wär heut mein letzter Tag" | 2014 | Peter Kraus | Zeitensprung |
| "Ain't No Mountain High Enough" | 2014 | Michael Bolton | Ain't No Mountain High Enough: A Tribute to Hitsville |

== Videography ==
=== Video albums ===
List of video albums, with selected chart positions, sales figures and certifications
| Title | Album details | Peak chart positions | | | Certifications |
| Title | Album details | GER | AUT | SWI | Certifications |
|---|---|---|---|---|---|
| So nah, so fern | Released: 14 September 2007; Label: EMI; Format: DVD, digital download | — | 4 | — | BVMI: 3× Gold |
| Mut zum Gefühl: Live | Released: 14 March 2008; Label: EMI; Format: DVD, digital download | 18 | 2 | 10 | BVMI: 2× Platinum |
| Zaubermond (Live) | Released: 19 June 2009; Label: EMI; Format: DVD, Blu-ray, digital download | 12 | 1 | 3 | BVMI: 3× Gold |
| Best of Helene Fischer Live: So wie ich bin | Released: 10 December 2010; Label: EMI; Format: DVD, Blu-ray, digital download | 1 | 1 | 5 | BVMI: 3× Gold |
| Live: Zum ersten Mal mit Band und Orchester | Released: 2 December 2011; Label: EMI; Format: DVD, Blu-ray, digital download | 14 | 2 | 3 | BVMI: Platinum |
| Für einen Tag: Live 2012 | Released: 14 December 2012; Label: EMI; Format: DVD, Blu-ray, digital download | 1 | 1 | 1 | BVMI: 3× Gold |
| Farbenspiel: Live aus dem Deutschen Theater München | Released: 15 November 2013; Label: Universal; Format: DVD, Blu-ray, digital download | 1 | 1 | 3 | BVMI: 5× Platinum |
| Farbenspiel Live – Die Tournee | Released: 5 December 2014; Label: Universal; Format: DVD, Blu-ray | | | | BVMI: 5× Gold |
| Weihnachten – Live aus der Wiener Hofburg | Released: 4 December 2015; Label: Universal; Format: DVD, Blu-ray | 1 | 1 | 1 | |
"—" denotes items which were not released in that country or failed to chart.

=== Music videos ===
| Title | Year | Director(s) |
|---|---|---|
| "Du fängst mich auf und lässt mich fliegen" | 2007 | Daniel Berlin |
| "So nah wie du" | 2007 | Daniel Berlin |
| "Fantasie hat Flügel" | 2007 | Daniel Berlin |
| "Das Karussell in meinem Bauch" | 2007 | Daniel Berlin |
| "Von hier bis unendlich" | 2007 | Daniel Berlin |
| "Und morgen früh küss ich dich wach" | 2007 | Daniel Berlin |
| "Feuer am Horizont" | 2007 | Daniel Berlin |
| "Mut zum Gefühl" | 2007 | Daniel Berlin |
| "Du hast mein Herz berührt" | 2007 | Daniel Berlin |
| "Im Reigen der Gefühle" | 2007 | Daniel Berlin |
| "Hinter den Tränen" | 2007 | Daniel Berlin |
| "Ich glaub dir hundert Lügen" | 2007 | Daniel Berlin |
| "Mitten im Paradies" | 2007 | Daniel Berlin |
| "Wo das Leben tanzt" | 2007 | Daniel Berlin |
| "Nicht von dieser Welt" | 2010 | Philipp Lenner |
| "Sweet Surrender" | 2010 | |
| "Phänomen" | 2011 | |
| "Atemlos durch die Nacht" | 2013 | Oliver Sommer |
| "Marathon" | 2014 | |
| "Ich bin bereit" | 2016 | |
| "Achterbahn" | 2017 | Kim Willecke |

=== Television ===
| Year | TV show | Role | Notes |
|---|---|---|---|
| 2011 | Die Helene Fischer Show | Herself | Annual Christmas Special; 2011- |
| 2013 | Das Traumschiff | Franziska Stein | Episode: "Puerto Rico" |
| 2015 | Tatort | Leyla Rudienka | Episode: "Der große Schmerz" |
