= List of number-one hits of 2015 (Germany) =

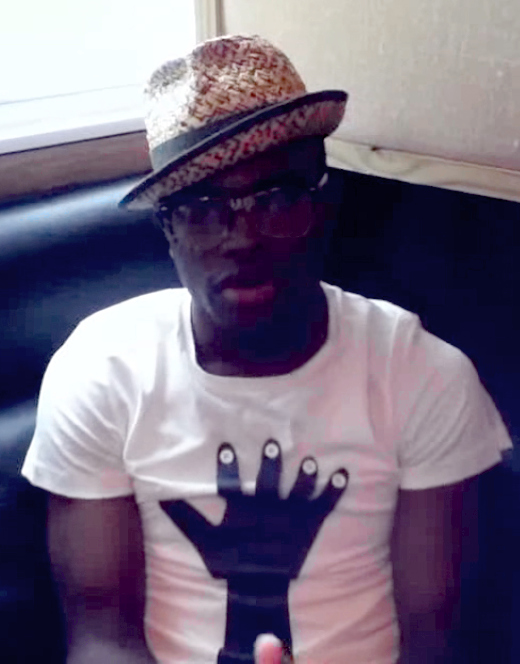
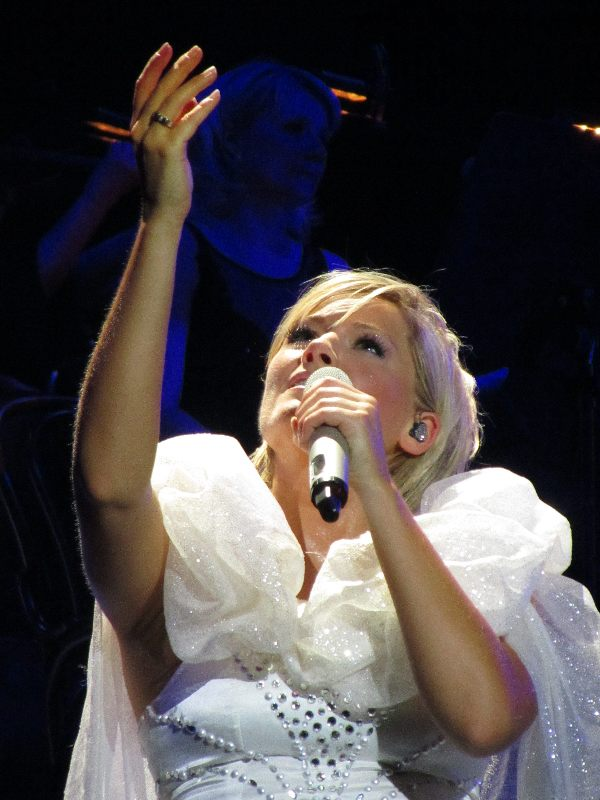
Omi's "Cheerleader" became the best-performing single of 2015, while Helene Fischer's "Weihnachten" became the best-performing album of the year.

The Media Control Charts are record charts compiled by Media Control on behalf of the German record industry. They include the "Single Top 100" and the "Album Top 100" chart. The chart week runs from Friday to Thursday, and the chart compilations are published on Tuesday for the record industry. The entire top 100 singles and top 100 albums are officially released the following Friday by Media Control. The charts are based on sales of physical singles and albums from retail outlets as well as permanent music downloads.

== Number-one hits by week ==
Key
†	Indicates best-performing single and album of 2015

Issue date	Song	Artist(s)	Ref.	Album	Artist(s)	Ref.
2 January	"Dangerous"	David Guetta featuring Sam Martin		Rock or Bust	AC/DC	
9 January	"Dangerous"	David Guetta featuring Sam Martin		Farbenspiel	Helene Fischer	
16 January	"Walk"	Kwabs		Gipfelstürmer	Unheilig	
23 January	"Outside"	Calvin Harris featuring Ellie Goulding		pp=mc²	Prinz Porno	
30 January	"The Hanging Tree"	James Newton Howard featuring Jennifer Lawrence		Kaos	Vega	
6 February	"The Hanging Tree"	James Newton Howard featuring Jennifer Lawrence		Neues von Gott	Favorite	
13 February	"Cheerleader" (Felix Jaehn Remix) †	OMI		Niveau weshalb warum	Deichkind	
20 February	"Love Me like You Do"	Ellie Goulding		Keiner kommt klar mit mir	Frank White	
27 February	"Love Me like You Do"	Ellie Goulding		Carlo Cokxxx Nutten 3	Bushido	
6 March	"Love Me like You Do"	Ellie Goulding		Fifty Shades of Grey: Original Motion Picture Soundtrack	Various artists	
13 March	"Love Me like You Do"	Ellie Goulding		Brandneu	Wolfgang Petry	
20 March	"Love Me like You Do"	Ellie Goulding		Rebel Heart	Madonna	
27 March	"Love Me like You Do"	Ellie Goulding		Tracker	Mark Knopfler	
3 April	"Are You with Me"	Lost Frequencies		Tracker	Mark Knopfler	
10 April	"Are You with Me"	Lost Frequencies		Asphalt Massaka 3	Farid Bang	
17 April	"See You Again"	Wiz Khalifa featuring Charlie Puth		Opposition	Frei.Wild	
24 April	"See You Again"	Wiz Khalifa featuring Charlie Puth		Opposition	Frei.Wild	
1 May	"See You Again"	Wiz Khalifa featuring Charlie Puth		Planktonweed Tape	SpongeBozz	
5 May	"See You Again"	Wiz Khalifa featuring Charlie Puth		Für immer Wochenende	Weekend	
8 May	"Ain't Nobody (Loves Me Better)"	Felix Jaehn featuring Jasmine Thompson		Baba aller Babas	Xatar	
15 May	"Ain't Nobody (Loves Me Better)"	Felix Jaehn featuring Jasmine Thompson		Achter Tag	Genetikk	
22 May	"Ain't Nobody (Loves Me Better)"	Felix Jaehn featuring Jasmine Thompson		Mountain Man	Andreas Gabalier	
29 May	"Ain't Nobody (Loves Me Better)"	Felix Jaehn featuring Jasmine Thompson		Muttersprache	Sarah Connor	
5 June	"Ain't Nobody (Loves Me Better)"	Felix Jaehn featuring Jasmine Thompson		Von Liebe, Tod und Freiheit	Santiano	
12 June	"Ain't Nobody (Loves Me Better)"	Felix Jaehn featuring Jasmine Thompson		Sing meinen Song – Das Tauschkonzert – Volume 2	Various artists	
19 June	"Ain't Nobody (Loves Me Better)"	Felix Jaehn featuring Jasmine Thompson		Fata Morgana	KC Rebell	
26 June	"Ain't Nobody (Loves Me Better)"	Felix Jaehn featuring Jasmine Thompson		Skills in Pills	Lindemann	
3 July	"Bye Bye"	Cro		Santiago Blue	Die Amigos	
10 July	"Bye Bye"	Cro		MTV Unplugged	Cro	
17 July	"Bye Bye"	Cro		Hurra die Welt geht unter	K.I.Z	
24 July	"Reality"	Lost Frequencies featuring Janieck Devy		Sing meinen Song – Das Tauschkonzert – Volume 2	Various artists	
31 July	"Reality"	Lost Frequencies featuring Janieck Devy		Sing meinen Song – Das Tauschkonzert – Volume 2	Various artists	
7 August	"Sugar"	Robin Schulz featuring Francesco Yates		Sing meinen Song – Das Tauschkonzert – Volume 2	Various artists	
14 August	"Astronaut"	Sido featuring Andreas Bourani		7	Paul Kalkbrenner	
21 August	"Sugar"	Robin Schulz featuring Francesco Yates		Zirkus Zeitgeist	Saltatio Mortis	
28 August	"Sugar"	Robin Schulz featuring Francesco Yates		Burning Bridges	Bon Jovi	
4 September	"Lieblingsmensch"	Namika		Bad Magic	Motörhead	
11 September	"Schrei nach Liebe"	Die Ärzte		The Book of Souls	Iron Maiden	
18 September	"Astronaut"	Sido featuring Andreas Bourani		Repentless	Slayer	
25 September	"Astronaut"	Sido featuring Andreas Bourani		Achtung	Pur	
2 October	"Astronaut"	Sido featuring Andreas Bourani		Dos Bros	The BossHoss	
9 October	"Astronaut"	Sido featuring Andreas Bourani		Heimat - Deine Lieder	Kastelruther Spatzen	
16 October	"Astronaut"	Sido featuring Andreas Bourani		Chronik III	Various artists	
23 October	"Astronaut"	Sido featuring Andreas Bourani		Breiter als 2 Türsteher	Majoe	
30 October	"Hello"	Adele		Muttersprache	Sarah Connor	
6 November	"Hello"	Adele		Tabaluga - Es lebe die Freundschaft!	Peter Maffay	
13 November	"Hello"	Adele		CLA$$IC	Bushido & Shindy	
20 November	"Hello"	Adele		Weihnachten †	Helene Fischer & The Royal Philharmonic Orchestra	
27 November	"Hello"	Adele		25	Adele	
4 December	"Hello"	Adele		Weihnachten †	Helene Fischer & The Royal Philharmonic Orchestra	
11 December	"Hello"	Adele		Weihnachten †	Helene Fischer & The Royal Philharmonic Orchestra	
18 December	"Hello"	Adele		Zuhältertape Vol. 4	Kollegah	
25 December	"Hello"	Adele		Weihnachten †	Helene Fischer & The Royal Philharmonic Orchestra	

== See also ==
- List of number-one hits (Germany)
- List of German airplay number-one songs
