= List of number-one hits of 2014 (Germany) =

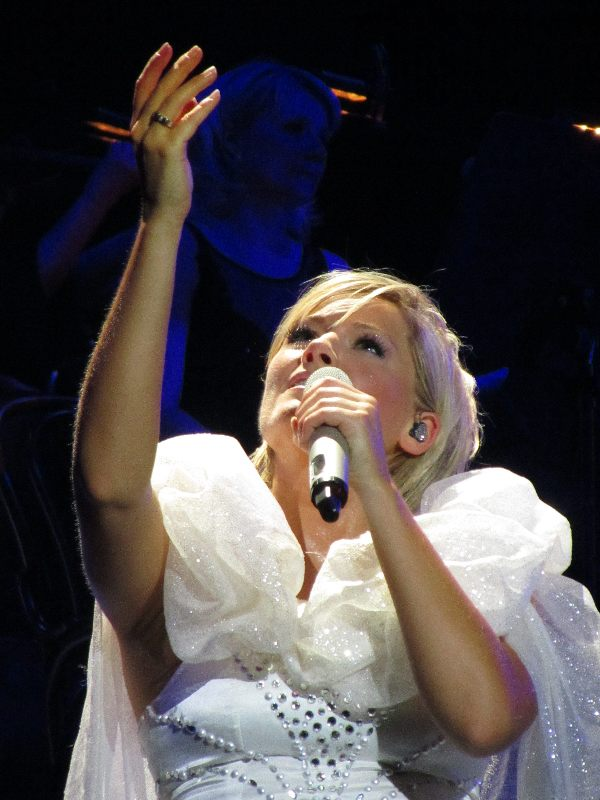
Helene Fischer's (pictured) "Farbenspiel" and "Atemlos durch die Nacht" became the best-performing album and single of the year respectively.

This is a list of the German Media Control Top100 Singles Chart number-ones of 2014. The Media Control Charts are record charts compiled by Media Control on behalf of the German record industry. They include the "Single Top 100" and the "Album Top 100" chart. The chart week runs from Friday to Thursday, and the chart compilations are published on Tuesday for the record industry. The entire top 100 singles and top 100 albums are officially released the following Friday by Media Control. The charts are based on sales of physical singles and albums from retail outlets as well as permanent music downloads.

== Number-one hits by week ==
Key
| † | Indicates best-performing single and album of 2014 |

| Issue date | Song | Artist(s) | Ref. | Album | Artist(s) | Ref. |
|---|---|---|---|---|---|---|
| 3 January | "Timber" | Pitbull featuring Kesha | | Farbenspiel † | Helene Fischer | |
| 10 January | "Timber" | Pitbull featuring Kesha | | Farbenspiel † | Helene Fischer | |
| 17 January | "Happy" | Pharrell Williams | | Farbenspiel † | Helene Fischer | |
| 24 January | "Happy" | Pharrell Williams | | High Hopes | Bruce Springsteen | |
| 31 January | "Happy" | Pharrell Williams | | Wenn das so ist | Peter Maffay | |
| 7 February | "Happy" | Pharrell Williams | | Wenn das so ist | Peter Maffay | |
| 14 February | "Happy" | Pharrell Williams | | Zum Glück in die Zukunft II | Marteria | |
| 21 February | "Happy" | Pharrell Williams | | Noir | Broilers | |
| 28 February | "Waves" (Robin Schulz Remix) | Mr Probz | | Sonny Black | Bushido | |
| 7 March | "Happy" | Pharrell Williams | | Einmal noch! | Wolfgang Petry | |
| 14 March | "Happy" | Pharrell Williams | | Farbenspiel † | Helene Fischer | |
| 21 March | "Waves" (Robin Schulz Remix) | Mr Probz | | Farbenspiel † | Helene Fischer | |
| 28 March | "Waves" (Robin Schulz Remix) | Mr Probz | | Killa | Farid Bang | |
| 4 April | "Waves" (Robin Schulz Remix) | Mr Probz | | Farbenspiel † | Helene Fischer | |
| 11 April | "Rather Be" | Clean Bandit featuring Jess Glynne | | Farbenspiel † | Helene Fischer | |
| 18 April | "Rather Be" | Clean Bandit featuring Jess Glynne | | Live – Der Krach der Republik | Die Toten Hosen | |
| 25 April | "Rather Be" | Clean Bandit featuring Jess Glynne | | Hammer & Michel | Jan Delay | |
| 2 May | "Rather Be" | Clean Bandit featuring Jess Glynne | | Farbenspiel † | Helene Fischer | |
| 9 May | "Auf uns" | Andreas Bourani | | Alphatier | Westernhagen | |
| 16 May | "The One" | Aneta Sablik | | Eine Nacht im Paradies | Fantasy | |
| 23 May | "Traum" | Cro | | King | Kollegah | |
| 30 May | "Traum" | Cro | | Ghost Stories | Coldplay | |
| 6 June | "Traum" | Cro | | Sing meinen Song – Das Tauschkonzert | Various Artists | |
| 13 June | "Traum" | Cro | | Rebellution | KC Rebell | |
| 20 June | "Prayer in C" (Robin Schulz Remix) | Lilly Wood and the Prick & Robin Schulz | | Melodie | Cro | |
| 27 June | "Prayer in C" (Robin Schulz Remix) | Lilly Wood and the Prick & Robin Schulz | | The Hunting Party | Linkin Park | |
| 4 July | "Prayer in C" (Robin Schulz Remix) | Lilly Wood and the Prick & Robin Schulz | | X | Ed Sheeran | |
| 11 July | "Prayer in C" (Robin Schulz Remix) | Lilly Wood and the Prick & Robin Schulz | | Sing meinen Song – Das Tauschkonzert | Various Artists | |
| 18 July | "Prayer in C" (Robin Schulz Remix) | Lilly Wood and the Prick & Robin Schulz | | Sing meinen Song – Das Tauschkonzert | Various Artists | |
| 25 July | "Auf uns" | Andreas Bourani | | The Black Market | Rise Against | |
| 1 August | "When the Beat Drops Out" | Marlon Roudette | | Atlantis – Live 2014 | Andrea Berg | |
| 8 August | "When the Beat Drops Out" | Marlon Roudette | | Sommerträume | Die Amigos | |
| 15 August | "Lovers on the Sun" | David Guetta featuring Sam Martin | | Beatsteaks | Beatsteaks | |
| 22 August | "Lovers on the Sun" | David Guetta featuring Sam Martin | | Farbenspiel† | Helene Fischer | |
| 29 August | "Lovers on the Sun" | David Guetta featuring Sam Martin | | Blind Rage | Accept | |
| 5 September | "Lovers on the Sun" | David Guetta featuring Sam Martin | | Farbenspiel† | Helene Fischer | |
| 12 September | "Lovers on the Sun" | David Guetta featuring Sam Martin | | Das Märchen vom gezogenen Stecker – Live | Niedeckens BAP | |
| 19 September | "Lovers on the Sun" | David Guetta featuring Sam Martin | | Breiter als der Türsteher | Majoe | |
| 26 September | "Lovers on the Sun" | David Guetta featuring Sam Martin | | In Schwarz | Kraftklub | |
| 3 October | "Fade Out Lines" | The Avener | | Stadtrandlichter | Clueso | |
| 10 October | "All About That Bass" | Meghan Trainor | | Boomshakkalakka | 257ers | |
| 17 October | "All About That Bass" | Meghan Trainor | | Fairytales – Best of 2006–2014 | Sunrise Avenue | |
| 24 October | "All About That Bass" | Meghan Trainor | | FVCKB!TCHE$GETMONE¥ | Shindy | |
| 31 October | "All About That Bass" | Meghan Trainor | | Faszination Weltraum | Farin Urlaub Racing Team | |
| 7 November | "All About That Bass" | Meghan Trainor | | Rekord | Die Fantastischen Vier | |
| 14 November | "All About That Bass" | Meghan Trainor | | Mitten im Leben – Das Tribute Album | Udo Jürgens und seine Gäste | |
| 21 November | "Dangerous" | David Guetta featuring Sam Martin | | The Endless River | Pink Floyd | |
| 28 November | "Dangerous" | David Guetta featuring Sam Martin | | Märtyrer | Kool Savas | |
| 5 December | "Do They Know It's Christmas?" (German Version) | Band Aid 30 Germany | | Dauernd jetzt | Herbert Grönemeyer | |
| 12 December | "Do They Know It's Christmas?" (German Version) | Band Aid 30 Germany | | Rock or Bust | AC/DC | |
| 19 December | "Dangerous" | David Guetta featuring Sam Martin | | Farbenspiel† | Helene Fischer | |
| 26 December | "Dangerous" | David Guetta featuring Sam Martin | | Gipfelstürmer | Unheilig | |

=== Best performing single ===
| Song | Artist(s) | Notes |
|---|---|---|
| "Atemlos durch die Nacht" † | Helene Fischer | Peaked at #3 |

== See also ==
- List of number-one hits (Germany)
- List of German airplay number-one songs
