= List of number-one hits of 2014 (Austria) =

This is a list of the Austrian number-one singles and albums of 2014 as compiled by Ö3 Austria Top 40, the official chart provider of Austria.

Issue date	Song	Artist	Album	Artist
3 January	"Timber"	Pitbull featuring Kesha	Swings Both Ways	Robbie Williams
10 January	"Timber"	Pitbull featuring Kesha	Farbenspiel	Helene Fischer
17 January	"Timber"	Pitbull featuring Kesha	Farbenspiel	Helene Fischer
24 January	"Lieder"	Adel Tawil	Neujahrskonzert 2014	Vienna Philharmonic / Daniel Barenboim
31 January	"Hard out Here"	Lily Allen	Neujahrskonzert 2014	Vienna Philharmonic / Daniel Barenboim
7 February	"Atemlos durch die Nacht"	Helene Fischer	Farbenspiel	Helene Fischer
14 February	"Atemlos durch die Nacht"	Helene Fischer	Farbenspiel	Helene Fischer
21 February	"Atemlos durch die Nacht"	Helene Fischer	Farbenspiel	Helene Fischer
28 February	"Happy"	Pharrell Williams	Sonny Black	Bushido
7 March	"Happy"	Pharrell Williams	Farbenspiel	Helene Fischer
14 March	"Happy"	Pharrell Williams	Farbenspiel	Helene Fischer
21 March	"Waves" (Robin Schulz Remix)	Mr. Probz	Farbenspiel	Helene Fischer
28 March	"Waves" (Robin Schulz Remix)	Mr. Probz	Killa	Farid Bang
4 April	"Waves" (Robin Schulz Remix)	Mr. Probz	Farbenspiel	Helene Fischer
11 April	"Waves" (Robin Schulz Remix)	Mr. Probz	Farbenspiel	Helene Fischer
18 April	"Rather Be"	Clean Bandit featuring Jess Glynne	Farbenspiel	Helene Fischer
25 April	"Rather Be"	Clean Bandit featuring Jess Glynne	Farbenspiel	Helene Fischer
2 May	"Budapest"	George Ezra	Farbenspiel	Helene Fischer
9 May	"Budapest"	George Ezra	Farbenspiel	Helene Fischer
16 May	"The One"	Aneta Sablik	Eine Nacht im Paradies	Fantasy
23 May	"Rise Like a Phoenix"	Conchita Wurst	King	Kollegah
30 May	"Traum"	Cro	Sing meinen Song – Das Tauschkonzert	Various Artists
6 June	"Traum"	Cro	Sing meinen Song – Das Tauschkonzert	Various Artists
13 June	"Traum"	Cro	Echt seerisch	Seer
20 June	"Traum"	Cro	Melodie	Cro
27 June	"Prayer in C" (Robin Schulz Remix)	Lilly Wood and the Prick & Robin Schulz	Sing meinen Song – Das Tauschkonzert	Various Artists
4 July	"Prayer in C" (Robin Schulz Remix)	Lilly Wood and the Prick & Robin Schulz	Sing meinen Song – Das Tauschkonzert	Various Artists
11 July	"Prayer in C" (Robin Schulz Remix)	Lilly Wood and the Prick & Robin Schulz	Sing meinen Song – Das Tauschkonzert	Various Artists
18 July	"Prayer in C" (Robin Schulz Remix)	Lilly Wood and the Prick & Robin Schulz	Sing meinen Song – Das Tauschkonzert	Various Artists
25 July	"Auf uns"	Andreas Bourani	Du warst der geilste Fehler meines Lebens	Nockalm Quintett
1 August	"Prayer in C" (Robin Schulz Remix)	Lilly Wood and the Prick & Robin Schulz	Farbenspiel	Helene Fischer
8 August	"Atemlos durch die Nacht"	Helene Fischer	Sommerträume	Die Amigos
15 August	"Lovers on the Sun"	David Guetta featuring Sam Martin	Farbenspiel	Helene Fischer
22 August	"Lovers on the Sun"	David Guetta featuring Sam Martin	Farbenspiel	Helene Fischer
29 August	"Wicked Wonderland"	Martin Tungevaag	Farbenspiel	Helene Fischer
5 September	"Wicked Wonderland"	Martin Tungevaag	Camouflage	Nazar
12 September	"Wicked Wonderland"	Martin Tungevaag	Seer Jubiläums Open Air 2014	Seer
19 September	"Wicked Wonderland"	Martin Tungevaag	Home Sweet Home	Andreas Gabalier
26 September	"Wicked Wonderland"	Martin Tungevaag	Farbenspiel	Helene Fischer
3 October	"All About That Bass"	Meghan Trainor	Popular Problems	Leonard Cohen
10 October	"All About That Bass"	Meghan Trainor	Lieblingsfarben und Tiere	Element of Crime
17 October	"All About That Bass"	Meghan Trainor	Farbenspiel	Helene Fischer
24 October	"All About That Bass"	Meghan Trainor	FVCKB!TCHE$GETMONE¥	Shindy
31 October	"All About That Bass"	Meghan Trainor	Mitten im Leben – Das Tribute Album	Udo Jürgens und seine Gäste
7 November	"All About That Bass"	Meghan Trainor	Mitten im Leben – Das Tribute Album	Udo Jürgens und seine Gäste
14 November	"Fade Out Lines"	The Avener	Farbenspiel	Helene Fischer
21 November	"Dangerous"	David Guetta featuring Sam Martin	The Endless River	Pink Floyd
28 November	"Dangerous"	David Guetta featuring Sam Martin	Four	One Direction
5 December	"Dangerous"	David Guetta featuring Sam Martin	Dauernd jetzt	Herbert Grönemeyer
12 December	"Dangerous"	David Guetta featuring Sam Martin	Rock or Bust	AC/DC
19 December	"The Hanging Tree"	James Newton Howard featuring Jennifer Lawrence	Rock or Bust	AC/DC
26 December	No Top 40 released			
