= List of best-selling albums in Germany =

Germany is the third largest music market in the world, and the largest in Europe. This is a list of the best-selling albums in Germany that have been certified by the Bundesverband Musikindustrie (BVMI). Since January 1, 2003, BVMI certifies an album platinum for the shipment of 200,000 copies across Germany. All albums in this list must have sold more than a million copies.

Certifications for albums released in Germany depend upon their release date.

== Certification levels ==
Certification	till 24 September 1999	till 31. December 2002	till 31 December 2012	since 1 January 2013
Gold	250,000	150,000	100,000	100,000
Platinum	500,000	300,000	200,000	200,000
3× Gold	750,000	450,000	300,000	300,000
2× Platinum	1,000,000	600,000	400,000	400,000
Diamond	–	–	–	750,000

Source: BVMI

== By units ==
Sortable table
Year	Title	Artist	Certification	Shipments
1987	Dirty Dancing	O.S.T. - Various	13× Gold^{‡}	3.25 million
2002	Mensch	Herbert Grönemeyer	21× Gold	3.15 million
1989	...But Seriously	Phil Collins	6× Platinum	3 million
1994	Over the Hump	The Kelly Family	9× Gold	3 million
1984	4630 Bochum	Herbert Grönemeyer	11× Gold	2.75 million
2013	Farbenspiel	Helene Fischer	13× Platinum^{‡}	2.6 million
1991	We Can't Dance	Genesis	5× Platinum	2.5 million
1992	Gold: Greatest Hits	ABBA	5× Platinum	2.5 million
1995	Rock Super Stars	Various artists	—	2.5 million
2001	Best Of	Andrea Berg	8× platinum	2.4 million
1988	Tracy Chapman	Tracy Chapman	9× Gold	2.25 million
1991	Greatest Hits II	Queen	9× Gold	2.25 million
1979	The Wall	Pink Floyd	4× Platinum	2.1 million
1973	1962–1966	The Beatles	4× Platinum	2 million
1987	Bad	Michael Jackson	4× Platinum	2 million
1991	Metallica	Metallica	4× Platinum^{‡}	2 million
1991	Dangerous	Michael Jackson	4× Platinum	2 million
1995	Abenteuerland	Pur	4× Platinum	2 million
1995	Bocelli	Andrea Bocelli	4× Platinum	2 million
1996	Alles	Wolfgang Petry	4× Platinum	2 million
2010	Best Of	Helene Fischer	10× Platinum	2 million
2010	Große Freiheit	Unheilig	9× Platinum^{‡}	1.8 million
1978	Grease	O.S.T. - Various	5× Gold	1.75 million
1978	Saturday Night Fever	O.S.T. - Various	3× Platinum	1.75 million
1981	Face Value	Phil Collins	7× Gold	1.75 million
1981	Greatest Hits	Queen	7× Gold	1.75 million
1988	Ö	Herbert Grönemeyer	7× Gold	1.75 million
1991	Joyride	Roxette	7× Gold	1.75 million
1994	Affentheater	Marius Müller-Westernhagen	7× Gold	1.75 million
1992	The Bodyguard	Whitney Houston	3× Platinum	1.7 million
2000	1	The Beatles	11× Gold	1.65 million
2011	21	Adele	8× Platinum	1.6 million
1972	Simon and Garfunkel's Greatest Hits	Simon & Garfunkel	2× Platinum	1.5 million
1973	The Dark Side of the Moon	Pink Floyd	3× Platinum^{‡}	1.5 million
1973	1967–1970	The Beatles	3× Platinum	1.5 million
1975	Wish You Were Here	Pink Floyd	Platinum	1.5 million
1980	Revanche	Peter Maffay	2× Platinum	1.5 million
1982	Thriller	Michael Jackson	3× Platinum	1.5 million
1985	Movin'	Jennifer Rush	3× Platinum	1.5 million
1985	No Jacket Required	Phil Collins	3× Platinum	1.5 million
1987	Winterkinder	Rolf Zuckowski	3× Platinum	1.5 million
1990	Serious Hits... Live!	Phil Collins	3× Platinum	1.5 million
1993	Both Sides	Phil Collins	3× Platinum	1.5 million
1993	Happy Nation	Ace of Base	3× Platinum	1.5 million
1993	Seiltänzertraum	Pur	3× Platinum	1.5 million
1995	The Lion King (Audio Book)	Diverse	3× Platinum	1.5 million
1995	HIStory: Past, Present and Future, Book I	Michael Jackson	3× Platinum	1.5 million
1995	Made in Heaven	Queen	3× Platinum	1.5 million
1996	Dove c'è musica	Eros Ramazzotti	3× Platinum	1.5 million
1997	Eros	Eros Ramazzotti	3× Platinum	1.5 million
1997	Let's Talk About Love	Celine Dion	3× Platinum	1.5 million
1998	Ray of Light	Madonna	3× Platinum	1.5 million
1998	Westernhagen - Live	Marius Müller-Westernhagen	3× Platinum	1.5 million
2001	Swing When You're Winning	Robbie Williams	5× Platinum	1.5 million
2008	Stadtaffe	Peter Fox	15× gold	1.5 million
1993	Music Box	Mariah Carey	2× Platinum	1.4 million
2013	Die Eiskönigin - Völlig Unverfroren (Audio Book)	Various	7× Platinum	1.4 million
1992	1492: Conquest of Paradise	Vangelis	5× Gold	1.3 million
2008	The Fame	Lady Gaga	13× Gold^{‡}	1.3 million
2010	Rapunzel: Neu verföhnt (Audio Book)	Various	13× Gold	1.3 million
2012	Bis ans Ende der Welt	Santiano	13× Gold	1.3 million
1968	Heintje	Heintje	9× Gold, Platinum	1.25 million
1977	Benjamin Blümchen als Wetterelefant (Audio Book)	Benjamin Blümchen	5× Gold	1.25 million
1977	Rumours	Fleetwood Mac	5× Gold	1.25 million
1979	Weihnachten mit Andrea Jürgens - Meine 20 schönsten Weihnachtslieder	Andrea Jürgens	5× Gold	1.25 million
1979	Benjamin Blümchen und die Schule (Audio Book)	Benjamin Blümchen	5× Gold	1.25 million
1980	Benjamin Blümchen hat Geburtstag (Audio Book)	Benjamin Blümchen	5× Gold	1.25 million
1982	Benjamin Blümchen als Weihnachtsmann (Audio Book)	Benjamin Blümchen	5× Gold	1.25 million
1983	Benjamin Blümchen als Feuerwehrmann (Audio Book)	Benjamin Blümchen	5× Gold	1.25 million
1983	Benjamin Blümchen auf dem Bauernhof (Audio Book)	Benjamin Blümchen	5× Gold	1.25 million
1984	Private Dancer	Tina Turner	5× Gold	1.25 million
1997	Titanic	James Horner	5× Gold	1.25 million
1991	Out of Time	R.E.M.	5× Gold	1.25 million
1991	Stars	Simply Red	5× Gold	1.25 million
1991	Use Your Illusion II	Guns N' Roses	5× Gold	1.25 million
1992	Automatic for the People	R.E.M.	5× Gold	1.25 million
1992	Unplugged	Eric Clapton	5× Gold	1.25 million
1996	Falling into You	Celine Dion	5× Gold	1.25 million
1997	Reload	Metallica	5× Gold	1.25 million
1997	Sehnsucht	Rammstein	5× Gold^{‡}	1.25 million
1998	Radio Maria	Marius Müller-Westernhagen	5× Gold	1.25 million
1998	Back for Good	Modern Talking	5× Gold	1.25 million
1979	Steppenwolf	Peter Maffay	Platinum	1.2 million
1989	Foreign Affair	Tina Turner	2× Platinum	1.2 million
2000	Hybrid Theory	Linkin Park	4× Platinum	1.2 million
2002	Escapology	Robbie Williams	4× Platinum	1.2 million
2006	Back to Black	Amy Winehouse	6× Platinum	1.2 million
2006	Loose	Nelly Furtado	6× Platinum^{‡}	1.2 million
2007	Vom selben Stern	Ich + Ich	6× Platinum	1.2 million
2013	Mit den Gezeiten	Santiano	6× Platinum	1.2 million
2015	25	Adele	6× Platinum	1.2 million
2015	Weihnachten	Helene Fischer	6× Platinum	1.2 million
2003	United	Deutschland sucht den Superstar	11× Gold	1.1 million
2005	Intensive Care	Robbie Williams	11× Gold	1.1 million
2006	Das große Leben	Rosenstolz	11× Gold	1.1 million
2011	MTV Unplugged - Live aus dem Hotel Atlantik	Udo Lindenberg	11× Gold	1.1 million
2015	Muttersprache	Sarah Connor	11× Gold	1.1 million
1999	All the Way... A Decade of Song	Celine Dion	7× Gold	1.05 million
2000	So far ... - Best Of	Marius Müller-Westernhagen	7× Gold	1.05 million
2001	Das Dschungelbuch (audio book)	Various	7× Gold	1.05 million
2001	Elle'ments	No Angels	7× Gold	1.05 million

- Tracy Chapman's eponymous debut album was certified 9× Gold in 2010. Since this album was released prior to September 24, 1999, every Gold certification it receives denotes 250,000 copies shipped. Thus at 9× Gold, 2.25 million copies of the album have been shipped across Germany.
- 1 by The Beatles was certified 11× Gold in 2007. Since this album was released prior to January 1, 2003, every Gold certification it receives denotes 150,000 copies shipped. Thus at 11× Gold, 1.65 million copies of the album have been shipped across Germany.

^{†} Usually the BVMI does not give a 6× Gold certification, but a 3× Platinum instead. The reason for this singular certification is unclear.

== See also ==
- List of best-selling singles in Germany

== Notes ==
- ^{‡}Certification include on-demand audio and video streams and track sale equivalent
