= Und morgen früh küss ich dich wach =

Promotional single by Helene Fischer

from the album Von hier bis unendlich
- Language: German
- Released: July 2006
- Recorded: 2005
- Studio: Taunusstudio
- Genre: Schlager; euro-pop
- Length: 3:44
- Label: EMI; Electrola
- Lyricists: Jean Frankenfurt, Irma Holder
- Producer: Jean Frankenfurt

Helene Fischer chronology
| "Von hier bis unendlich" (2006) | "Und morgen früh küss ich dich wach" (2006) | "Im Reigen der Gefühle" (2006) |

"Und morgen früh küss ich dich wach" (English: And tomorrow morning I'll kiss you awake) is a song by German schlager & euro-pop singer Helene Fischer, released in July 2006, through the labels EMI Music Germany and Electrola. The song was produced by Jean Frankenfurt, and lyrics were written by Irma Holder as well as Jean. Taken from her debut studio album, "Von hier bis unendlich" (2006), "Und morgen früh küss ich dich wach" is a euro-pop and schlager song, talking about tomorrow's promises with her lover, and that nothing will ever destroy their love.

Released as a promotional single, the song was performed on many German music shows, but did not chart during the time of its promotional release. However, in later years, the song became more popular due to other artists covering the song, and therefore causing popularity within the charts. In May 2023, almost 17 years after the release of the album and promotional single, the single was certified Gold in Germany by the Bundesverband Musikindustrie (BVMI) for shipments of 150,000 copies.

== Background and composition ==
The single was recorded, mixed, and mastered by Jean Frankenfurt, who produced all 12 tracks on her debut studio album. Recording sessions took place in Taunusstudio, located in Frankfurt. The song's lyrics were written by Irma Holder and Jean himself.

== Live performances ==
The single was performed on many musical shows, such as "Fernsehgarten", "Musik für Sie", and "Aktuelle Schaubude". The song was also performed on a famous show called "Schlager des Jahres".

== Commercial performance ==
Although the promotional single did not chart on any domestic German charts (or foreign), it had many well-received televised performances, and launched her into the mainstream media.

=== Resurgence in 2013 ===
The single later gained popularity from many covered performances, such as Beatrice Egli's cover of the single in 2013. This later caused the song to resurface the charts of Germany and Switzerland.

== Track listing ==
All tracks are written by Jean Frankenfurt and Irma Holder.

Promo CD
| No. | Title | Length |
|---|---|---|
| 1. | "Und morgen früh küss ich dich wach" | 3:44 |
| Total length: | | 3:44 |

== Charts ==
=== Weekly charts ===
Weekly chart performance
| Chart (2013) | Peak position |
|---|---|
| German Singles Chart (GfK) | 83 |
| Swiss Singles Chart (Swiss HitParade) | 61 |

== Certifications and sales ==
Regional sales/certifications
| Region | Certification | Certified units/sales |
|---|---|---|
| Germany (BVMI) | Gold | 150,000 |
