= List of Dutch Top 40 number-one singles of 2014 =

This is a list of the Dutch Top 40 number-one singles of 2014. The Dutch Top 40 is a chart that ranks the best-performing singles of the Netherlands. It is published every week by radio station Radio 538.

== Chart history ==
Issue date	Song	Artist(s)	Ref.
January 4	"Timber"	Pitbull featuring Kesha	
January 11	"Timber"	Pitbull featuring Kesha	
January 18	"Timber"	Pitbull featuring Kesha	
January 25	"All of Me"	John Legend	
February 1	"All of Me"	John Legend	
February 8	"All of Me"	John Legend	
February 15	"All of Me"	John Legend	
February 22	"Dark Horse"	Katy Perry featuring Juicy J	
March 1	"Dark Horse"	Katy Perry featuring Juicy J	
March 8	"Rather Be"	Clean Bandit featuring Jess Glynne	
March 15	"Rather Be"	Clean Bandit featuring Jess Glynne	
March 22	"Rather Be"	Clean Bandit featuring Jess Glynne	
March 29	"Rather Be"	Clean Bandit featuring Jess Glynne	
April 5	"Rather Be"	Clean Bandit featuring Jess Glynne	
April 12	"Rather Be"	Clean Bandit featuring Jess Glynne	
April 19	"Rather Be"	Clean Bandit featuring Jess Glynne	
April 26	"Rather Be"	Clean Bandit featuring Jess Glynne	
May 3	"Rather Be"	Clean Bandit featuring Jess Glynne	
May 10	"Rather Be"	Clean Bandit featuring Jess Glynne	
May 17	"Rather Be"	Clean Bandit featuring Jess Glynne	
May 24	"Summer"	Calvin Harris	
May 31	"Summer"	Calvin Harris	
June 7	"Am I Wrong"	Nico & Vinz	
June 14	"Am I Wrong"	Nico & Vinz	
June 21	"Am I Wrong"	Nico & Vinz	
June 28	"Stay High"	Tove Lo featuring Hippie Sabotage	
July 5	"Stay High"	Tove Lo featuring Hippie Sabotage	
July 12	"Stay High"	Tove Lo featuring Hippie Sabotage	
July 19	"Salsa Tequila"	Anders Nilsen	
July 26	"Salsa Tequila"	Anders Nilsen	
August 2	"Salsa Tequila"	Anders Nilsen	
August 9	"Prayer in C" (Robin Schulz Remix)	Lilly Wood & The Prick and Robin Schulz	
August 16	"Prayer in C" (Robin Schulz Remix)	Lilly Wood & The Prick and Robin Schulz	
August 23	"Prayer in C" (Robin Schulz Remix)	Lilly Wood & The Prick and Robin Schulz	
August 30	"Prayer in C" (Robin Schulz Remix)	Lilly Wood & The Prick and Robin Schulz	
September 6	"Fireball"	Pitbull featuring John Ryan	
September 13	"Fireball"	Pitbull featuring John Ryan	
September 20	"Fireball"	Pitbull featuring John Ryan	
September 27	"Fireball"	Pitbull featuring John Ryan	
October 4	"Blame"	Calvin Harris featuring John Newman	
October 11	"Blame"	Calvin Harris featuring John Newman	
October 18	"Nothing Really Matters"	Mr Probz	
October 25	"Nothing Really Matters"	Mr Probz	
November 1	"Nothing Really Matters"	Mr Probz	
November 8	"Nothing Really Matters"	Mr Probz	
November 15	"Nothing Really Matters"	Mr Probz	
November 22	"Nothing Really Matters"	Mr Probz	
November 29	"Nothing Really Matters"	Mr Probz	
December 6	"Thinking Out Loud"	Ed Sheeran	
December 13	"Thinking Out Loud"	Ed Sheeran	
December 20	"Thinking Out Loud"	Ed Sheeran	
December 27	No Top 40 released		

== Number-one artists ==
Position	Artist	Weeks #1
1	Clean Bandit	11
1	Jess Glynne	11
2	Mr Probz	7
2	Pitbull	7
3	Calvin Harris	4
3	John Ryan	4
3	John Legend	4
3	Lilly Wood & The Prick	4
3	Robin Schulz	4
4	Anders Nilsen	3
4	Ed Sheeran	3
4	Kesha	3
4	Nico & Vinz	3
4	Tove Lo	3
4	Hippie Sabotage	3
5	John Newman	2
5	Katy Perry	2
5	Juicy J	2

== See also ==
- 2014 in music
