= Für einen Tag =

Studio album by Helene Fischer
- Released: 14 October 2011
- Recorded: 2011
- Studio: Lanxess Arena (Germany), Tanusstudio
- Genre: Schlager, euro-pop, pop
- Length: 2:21:24 (2x CD Exklusive Fan-Edition)
- Label: EMI
- Producer: Jean Frankfurter

Helene Fischer chronology
So wie ich bin (2009)	Für einen Tag (2011)	Farbenspiel (2013)

Für einen Tag (English: For One Day) is the fifth studio album by German singer Helene Fischer. It was released on 14 October 2011 by EMI.

== Critical reception ==
A professional rater from AllMusic (Jon O'Brien) said, "After courting international audiences with 2010's The English Ones, Siberian-born German-raised vocalist Helene Fischer returns to more familiar territory with her fifth studio album, Für einen Tag, hoping to further stake her claim as the natural successor to Andrea Berg's Queen of Schlager-Pop throne."

He also adds, "..its 16 tracks contain her usual blend of slightly camp uptempo singalongs ("Villa In der Schlossallee," "Die Holle Morgen Fruh") and Eurovision-friendly power ballads ("War Heut Mein Letzter Tag," "Ich Lebe Jetzt"), although this time round, there's a slightly more eclectic vibe among the tinny synth-brass hooks and Europop beats. The jaunty Highlands jig of "Du Kennst Mich Doch" and the gentle accordions on "Lass Diese Nacht Nie Mehr Enden" bear the hallmarks of her partner Florian Silbereisen's traditional Volksmusik output; there are convincing attempts at big-band jazz ("Nur Wer den Wahnsinn Liebt"), steel guitar-laden country ("Ich Will Spuren, Dass Ich Lebe"), and flamenco-tinged pop ("Copilot," "Allein im Licht"); while an emotive duet with Michael Bolton on an acoustic cover version of Bob Dylan's "Make You Feel My Love" suggests she hasn't fully abandoned her English-speaking crossover ambitions just yet."

Professional Ratings
Reviewer	Rating
AllMusic	3/5

== Track listing ==
Für einen Tag – Standard edition
No.	Title	Writer(s)	Producer(s)	Length
1.	"Villa in der Schlossallee"	Jean Frankfurter; Kristina Bach	Frankfurter	3:27
2.	"Du kennst mich doch"	Frankfurter; Tobias Reitz	Frankfurter	3:52
3.	"Nur wer den Wahnsinn liebt"	Frankfurter; Joachim Horn-Bernges	Frankfurter	4:03
4.	"Wär' heut' mein letzter Tag"	Frankfurter; Reitz	Frankfurter	3:34
5.	"Copilot"	Frankfurter	Frankfurter	4:06
6.	"Für einen Tag"	Frankfurter; Horn-Bernges	Frankfurter	4:26
7.	"Phänomen"	Frankfurter; Bach	Frankfurter	3:58
8.	"Lass diese Nacht nie mehr enden"	Frankfurter; Bach	Frankfurter	4:19
9.	"Die Hölle morgen früh"	Frankfurter; Horn-Bernges	Frankfurter	4:50
10.	"Ich will spüren, dass ich lebe"	Frankfurter; Bach	Frankfurter	4:33
11.	"Vielleicht bin ich viel stärker als du denkst"	Frankfurter; Reitz	Frankfurter	4:08
12.	"Geradeausv"	Frankfurter; Reitz	Frankfurter	2:51
13.	"Sehnsucht"	Frankfurter; Horn-Bernges	Frankfurter	4:38
14.	"Ich lebe jetzt"	Frankfurter; Bach	Frankfurter	3:36
15.	"Allein im Licht"	Frankfurter; Bach	Frankfurter	4:32

Bonus track
No.	Title	Writer(s)	Producer(s)	Length
16.	"Make You Feel My Love" (Michael Bolton featuring Helene Fischer)	Bob Dylan	Michael Bolton	3:13

== Personnel ==
List of production used in this album.

- Bass – Krischan Freese* (tracks: 3, 10)
- Choir – Bimmey Oberreit*, Franco Leon, Kareena Schönberger, Rainer Marz
- Drums – Jens Carstens (tracks: 3, 10)
- Engineer – Michael Bestmann
- Guitar – Peter Koobs (tracks: 3, 10), Peter Weihe (tracks: 1, 2, 4 to 9, 11 to 15)
- Keyboards, Programmed By, Arranged By – Jean Frankfurter
- Piano, Arranged By [Additional] – Christoph Papendieck (tracks: 3, 10)
- Producer – Jean Frankfurter
- Saxophone – Frank Walden (tracks: 1, 3, 11)
- Strings – Streicherensemble Der Mannheimer Philharmonie (tracks: 4, 6, 7, 13, 15)
- Trombone – Trevor Mires (tracks: 1, 3, 11)
- Trumpet – Henry Collins (3) (tracks: 1, 3, 11)

== Charts ==
=== Weekly charts ===
Chart (2011)	Peak position
Austrian Albums (Ö3 Austria)	2
Belgian Albums (Ultratop Flanders)	7
Danish Albums (Hitlisten)	19
Dutch Albums (Album Top 100)	1
German Albums (Offizielle Top 100)	1
Swiss Albums (Schweizer Hitparade)	2

=== Year-end charts ===
Chart (2011)	Position
Austrian Albums (Ö3 Austria)	21
German Albums (Offizielle Top 100)	10
Swiss Albums (Schweizer Hitparade)	40
Chart (2012)	Position
Austrian Albums (Ö3 Austria)	23
Dutch Albums (Album Top 100)	97
German Albums (Offizielle Top 100)	19
Swiss Albums (Schweizer Hitparade)	48
Chart (2013)	Position
Austrian Albums (Ö3 Austria)	54
German Albums (Offizielle Top 100)	41

== Certifications and sales ==
Region	Certification	Certified units/sales
Austria (IFPI Austria)	3× Platinum	60,000^{*}
Germany (BVMI)	4× Platinum	800,000^{^}
Switzerland (IFPI Switzerland)	Gold	15,000^{^}
^{*} Sales figures based on certification alone.^{^} Shipments figures based on certification alone.
