= Prayer in C =

2014 song by Lilly Wood and the Prick

"Prayer in C" (Robin Schulz remix)

Single by Lilly Wood and the Prick and Robin Schulz

from the album Prayer
- Released: 6 June 2014
- Recorded: 2010–2014
- Genre: Tropical house; deep house; dance-pop
- Length: 3:12
- Label: TONSPIEL; Warner
- Songwriters: Benjamin Cotto; Nili Hadida
- Producer: Robin Schulz

Lilly Wood and the Prick singles chronology
"Into Trouble" (2014)	"Prayer in C" (Robin Schulz remix) (2014)	"Shadows" (2015)

Robin Schulz singles chronology
"Waves" (Robin Schulz remix) (2014)	"Prayer in C" (Robin Schulz remix) (2014)	"Willst Du" (2014)

Music video
- "Prayer In C" on YouTube

"Prayer in C" is a song by the French folk-pop duo Lilly Wood and the Prick that was originally released on their album Invincible Friends in 2010.

In 2014, the German DJ and record producer Robin Schulz remixed the song, and the remix was re-released in June 2014. He used a CD of Invincible Friends as the source and initially made his remix available as a free download, to the consternation of the copyright owner, Wagram Music.

The Schulz remix topped the French Singles Chart. Outside France, the remix of "Prayer in C" topped the charts in Austria, Belgium, the Czech Republic, Denmark, Finland, Schulz's native Germany, Greece, Hungary, Italy, Luxembourg, Norway, Poland, Portugal, the Republic of Ireland, Romania, Spain, Sweden, Switzerland and the United Kingdom, peaked within the top ten in Australia and New Zealand and peaked in the top 40 of the charts in Brazil, Canada and the United States. In September 2014, Kiesza covered the song in Live Lounge on BBC Radio 1 in the United Kingdom.

== Music video ==
The music video for the song was directed by Maxim Rosenbauer and filmed in Berlin, Germany. The video was uploaded on Robin Schulz's YouTube channel on May 21, 2014. As of June 2025, the music video has amassed over 850 million views on Youtube.

== Formats and track listings ==
- Digital download
1. "Prayer in C" (Robin Schulz Radio Edit) – 3:09
- CD single
1. "Prayer in C" (Robin Schulz Radio Edit) – 3:09
2. "Prayer in C" (Robin Schulz Remix) – 5:22
- Digital download – 5th anniversary rework
1. "Prayer in C" (Robin Schulz radio edit) – 3:09
2. "Prayer in C" (5th anniversary remix) – 2:59
3. "Prayer in C" (VIP remix) – 2:44

== Charts ==
=== Original version ===
==== Weekly charts ====
Chart (2014)	Peak position
France (SNEP)	9

==== Year-end charts ====
Chart (2014)	Position
France (SNEP)	196

=== Robin Schulz Remix ===
==== Weekly charts ====
2014–2015 weekly chart performance for "Prayer in C" (Robin Schulz Remix)
Chart (2014–2015)	Peak position
Australia (ARIA)	7
Austria (Ö3 Austria Top 40)	1
Belgium (Ultratop 50 Flanders)	1
Belgium Dance (Ultratop Flanders)	1
Belgium (Ultratop 50 Wallonia)	1
Belgium Dance (Ultratop Wallonia)	1
Brazil (Billboard Brasil Hot 100)	27
Brazil Hot Pop Songs	12
Canada Hot 100 (Billboard)	12
CIS Airplay (TopHit)	1
Czech Republic Airplay (ČNS IFPI)	2
Czech Republic Singles Digital (ČNS IFPI)	1
Denmark (Tracklisten)	1
Euro Digital Song Sales (Billboard)	1
Finland (Suomen virallinen lista)	1
France (SNEP)	1
France Streaming (SNEP)	1
Germany (GfK)	1
Greece (Billboard)	1
Hungary (Dance Top 40)	1
Hungary (Rádiós Top 40)	1
Hungary (Single Top 40)	1
Israel International Airplay (Media Forest)	1
Ireland (IRMA)	1
Italy (FIMI)	1
Mexico (Billboard Ingles Airplay)	1
Mexico Anglo (Monitor Latino)	3
Lebanon (The Official Lebanese Top 20)	1
Luxembourg (Billboard)	1
Netherlands (Dutch Top 40)	1
Netherlands (Single Top 100)	1
New Zealand (Recorded Music NZ)	5
Norway (VG-lista)	1
Poland Airplay (ZPAV)	1
Poland Dance (ZPAV)	1
Portugal (Billboard)	1
Romania (Airplay 100)	6
Romania Airplay (Media Forest)	3
Russia Airplay (TopHit)	1
Scottish Singles Sales (Official Charts)	1
Slovakia Airplay (ČNS IFPI)	1
Slovakia Singles Digital (ČNS IFPI)	1
Slovenia (SloTop50)	1
Spain (Promusicae)	1
Sweden (Sverigetopplistan)	1
Switzerland (Schweizer Hitparade)	1
Ukraine Airplay (TopHit)	19
UK Singles (Official Charts)	1
UK Dance (Official Charts)	1
US Billboard Hot 100	23
US Hot Dance/Electronic Songs (Billboard)	1
US Adult Pop Airplay (Billboard)	18
US Latin Pop Airplay (Billboard)	31
US Pop Airplay (Billboard)	7
US Rhythmic Airplay (Billboard)	23

2016 weekly chart performance for "Prayer in C" (Robin Schulz Remix)
Chart (2016)	Peak position
Russia Airplay (TopHit)	60
CIS Airplay (TopHit)	68
Ukraine Airplay (TopHit)	119

2017 weekly chart performance for "Prayer in C" (Robin Schulz Remix)
Chart (2017)	Peak position
Ukraine Airplay (TopHit)	175

2018 weekly chart performance for "Prayer in C" (Robin Schulz Remix)
Chart (2018)	Peak position
Ukraine Airplay (TopHit)	186

2019 weekly chart performance for "Prayer in C" (Robin Schulz Remix)
Chart (2019)	Peak position
Ukraine Airplay (TopHit)	197

2020 weekly chart performance for "Prayer in C" (Robin Schulz Remix)
Chart (2020)	Peak position
Ukraine Airplay (TopHit)	173

2021 weekly chart performance for "Prayer in C" (Robin Schulz Remix)
Chart (2021)	Peak position
Ukraine Airplay (TopHit)	167

2022 weekly chart performance for "Prayer in C" (Robin Schulz Remix)
Chart (2022)	Peak position
CIS Airplay (TopHit)	196

2023 weekly chart performance for "Prayer in C" (Robin Schulz Remix)
Chart (2023)	Peak position
CIS Airplay (TopHit)	161
Lithuania Airplay (TopHit)	159
Moldova Airplay (TopHit)	179

2024 weekly chart performance for "Prayer in C" (Robin Schulz Remix)
Chart (2024)	Peak position
Belarus Airplay (TopHit)	108
Lithuania Airplay (TopHit)	80
Moldova Airplay (TopHit)	107

2025 weekly chart performance for "Prayer in C" (Robin Schulz Remix)
Chart (2025)	Peak position
Belarus Airplay (TopHit)	155
Lithuania Airplay (TopHit)	69
Moldova Airplay (TopHit)	111

==== Monthly charts ====
2014 monthly chart performance for "Prayer in C" (Robin Schulz Remix)
Chart (2014)	Peak position
CIS Airplay (TopHit)	1
Russia Airplay (TopHit)	1
Ukraine Airplay (TopHit)	20

2015 monthly chart performance for "Prayer in C" (Robin Schulz Remix)
Chart (2015)	Peak position
CIS Airplay (TopHit)	4
Russia Airplay (TopHit)	4
Ukraine Airplay (TopHit)	42

2016 monthly chart performance for "Prayer in C" (Robin Schulz Remix)
Chart (2016)	Peak position
CIS Airplay (TopHit)	99
Russia Airplay (TopHit)	93

==== Year-end charts ====
2014 year-end chart performance for "Prayer in C" (Robin Schulz Remix)
Chart (2014)	Position
Australia (ARIA)	43
Austria (Ö3 Austria Top 40)	4
Belgium (Ultratop Flanders)	2
Belgium (Ultratop Wallonia)	2
CIS Airplay (TopHit)	9
Denmark (Tracklisten)	11
France (SNEP)	2
Germany (Official German Charts)	6
Hungary (Dance Top 40)	28
Hungary (Rádiós Top 40)	10
Hungary (Single Top 40)	3
Israel (Media Forest)	4
Italy (FIMI)	6
Netherlands (Dutch Top 40)	6
Netherlands (Mega Dance Top 30)	1
Netherlands (Single Top 100)	4
Poland (ZPAV)	6
Romania (Airplay 100)	28
Russia Airplay (TopHit)	7
Slovenia (SloTop50)	12
Spain (PROMUSICAE)	11
Sweden (Sverigetopplistan)	13
Switzerland (Schweizer Hitparade)	2
Ukraine Airplay (TopHit)	92
UK Singles (Official Charts Company)	22
US Hot Dance/Electronic Songs (Billboard)	34

2015 year-end chart performance for "Prayer in C" (Robin Schulz Remix)
Chart (2015)	Position
Belgium (Ultratop Wallonia)	61
Canada (Canadian Hot 100)	46
CIS Airplay (TopHit)	13
France (SNEP)	31
Germany (Official German Charts)	100
Hungary (Dance Top 40)	10
Hungary (Single Top 40)	56
Italy (FIMI)	47
Netherlands (Single Top 100)	72
Russia Airplay (TopHit)	10
Slovenia (SloTop50)	19
Spain (PROMUSICAE)	73
Switzerland (Schweizer Hitparade)	39
Ukraine Airplay (TopHit)	180
US Hot Dance/Electronic Songs (Billboard)	7
US Mainstream Top 40 (Billboard)	45

2016 year-end chart performance for "Prayer in C" (Robin Schulz Remix)
Chart (2016)	Position
Argentina Airplay (Monitor Latino)	78

2024 year-end chart performance for "Prayer in C" (Robin Schulz Remix)
Chart (2024)	Position
Lithuania Airplay (TopHit)	125

2025 year-end chart performance for "Prayer in C" (Robin Schulz Remix)
Chart (2025)	Position
Lithuania Airplay (TopHit)	111

=== Decade-end charts ===
10s Decade-end chart performance for "Prayer in C" (Robin Schulz Remix)
Chart (2010–2019)	Position
CIS Airplay (TopHit)	12
Germany (Official German Charts)	41
Netherlands (Single Top 100)	12
Russia Airplay (TopHit)	7
US Hot Dance/Electronic Songs (Billboard)	44

20s Half-decade-end chart performance for "Prayer in C" (Robin Schulz Remix)
Chart (2020–2025)	Position
Lithuania Airplay (TopHit)	192

=== Walter Ego Remix ===
==== Weekly charts ====
2014 weekly chart performance for "Prayer in C" (Walter Ego Remix)
Chart (2014)	Peak position
Ukraine Airplay (TopHit)	6

2015 weekly chart performance for "Prayer in C" (Walter Ego Remix)
Chart (2015)	Peak position
CIS Airplay (TopHit)	191
Ukraine Airplay (TopHit)	3

2016 weekly chart performance for "Prayer in C" (Walter Ego Remix)
Chart (2016)	Peak position
Ukraine Airplay (TopHit)	88

2017 weekly chart performance for "Prayer in C" (Walter Ego Remix)
Chart (2017)	Peak position
Ukraine Airplay (TopHit)	115

2024 weekly chart performance for "Prayer in C" (Walter Ego Remix)
Chart (2024)	Peak position
Moldova Airplay (TopHit)	144

2025 weekly chart performance for "Prayer in C" (Walter Ego Remix)
Chart (2025)	Peak position
Moldova Airplay (TopHit)	169

==== Monthly charts ====
2014 monthly chart performance for "Prayer in C" (Walter Ego Remix)
Chart (2014)	Peak position
Ukraine Airplay (TopHit)	10

2015 monthly chart performance for "Prayer in C" (Walter Ego Remix)
Chart (2015)	Peak position
Ukraine Airplay (TopHit)	5

==== Year-end charts ====
2014 year-end chart performance for "Prayer in C" (Walter Ego Remix)
Chart (2014)	Position
Ukraine Airplay (TopHit)	135

2015 year-end chart performance for "Prayer in C" (Walter Ego Remix)
Chart (2015)	Position
Ukraine Airplay (TopHit)	58

== Certifications ==
Region	Certification	Certified units/sales
Australia (ARIA)	5× Platinum	350,000^{‡}
Austria (IFPI Austria)	Platinum	30,000^{*}
Belgium (BRMA)	Platinum	30,000^{*}
Canada (Music Canada)	6× Platinum	480,000^{‡}
Denmark (IFPI Danmark)	Gold	15,000^{^}
France	—	150,000
Germany (BVMI)	Diamond	1,000,000^{‡}
Italy (FIMI)	5× Platinum	250,000^{‡}
Mexico (AMPROFON)	Gold	30,000^{*}
Netherlands (NVPI)	Platinum	20,000^{‡}
New Zealand (RMNZ)	4× Platinum	120,000^{‡}
Norway (IFPI Norway)	4× Platinum	40,000^{‡}
Spain (Promusicae)	2× Platinum	80,000^{‡}
Sweden (GLF)	3× Platinum	120,000^{‡}
Switzerland (IFPI Switzerland)	3× Platinum	90,000^{‡}
United Kingdom (BPI)	3× Platinum	1,800,000^{‡}
United States (RIAA)	Platinum	1,000,000^{‡}
Streaming
Denmark (IFPI Danmark)	2× Platinum	5,200,000^{†}
Spain (Promusicae)	Platinum	8,000,000^{†}
^{*} Sales figures based on certification alone.^{^} Shipments figures based on certification alone.^{‡} Sales+streaming figures based on certification alone.^{†} Streaming-only figures based on certification alone.

== Release history ==
Country	Date	Format	Label	Ref.
Austria	6 June 2014	CD; digital download	Warner	
Germany	6 June 2014	CD; digital download	Warner	
Switzerland	6 June 2014	CD; digital download	Warner	
France	6 June 2014	Digital download	Warner	
Spain	13 June 2014	Digital download	Warner	
Italy	13 June 2014	Digital download	Warner	
Italy	20 June 2014	Contemporary hit radio	Warner	
United States	17 June 2014	Digital download	Atlantic	
Ireland	22 August 2014	Digital download	Atlantic	
United Kingdom	24 August 2014	Digital download	Atlantic	
United States	21 October 2014	Contemporary hit radio	Roadrunner	
Various	6 June 2019	Digital download	Warner	

== See also ==
- List of number-one hits of 2014 (Austria)
- List of number-one hits of 2014 (Denmark)
- List of number-one singles of 2014 (Finland)
- List of number-one hits of 2014 (France)
- List of number-one hits of 2014 (Germany)
- List of number-one singles of 2014 (Ireland)
- List of number-one singles of 2014 (Netherlands)
- List of number-one hits of 2014 (Norway)
- List of number-one singles of 2014 (Poland)
- List of number-one hits of 2014 (Scotland)
- List of number-one singles of 2014 (Sweden)
- List of UK Dance Chart number-one singles of 2014
- List of UK Singles Chart number ones of the 2010s
