= Atemlos durch die Nacht =

Single by Helene Fischer

from the album Farbenspiel
- Released: 29 November 2013
- Recorded: 2013
- Genre: Europop; Eurodance
- Length: 3:39
- Label: Polydor
- Songwriter: Kristina Bach
- Producer: Jean Frankfurter

Helene Fischer singles chronology
"Fehlerfrei" (2013)	"Atemlos durch die Nacht" (2013)	"Marathon" (2014)

Music video
- "Atemlos durch die Nacht" on YouTube

"Atemlos durch die Nacht" (German pronunciation: [ˈaːtəmˌloːs dʊʁç di ˈnaxt], German for Breathless Through the Night) is a song by German singer Helene Fischer. It was written by Kristina Bach and produced by Fischer's long-time contributor Jean Frankfurter for her sixth studio album, Farbenspiel (2013). Released on 29 November 2013 as the album's second single, it enjoyed major success in German-speaking Europe, becoming Fischer's biggest hit to date and her first top 10 entry in Austria, Germany, Luxembourg and Switzerland. As of December 2022, it is the fifth most successful song in German history.

== Release ==
The song was written by pop singer and composer Kristina Bach, and produced by Jean Frankfurter. Bach says the song came to her in mere minutes while she was on the Spanish island of Mallorca.

The song was originally intended for Bach to sing it herself, but at an event, Helene Fischer asked if Bach had a new song for her. Initially, she declined, but later she gave the song to Fischer.

The song narrates a perfect night between a loving couple, a night without taboos and full of freedom that should never end.

The music video opens with a shot of the Chicago skyline and streets at dusk. Fischer then prepares for the evening. She drives a BMW M6 convertible to the first party location, where she sings her song with the guests. Later, she leaves the party with two friends and takes a traditional London black cab to the next location, a bar. After a short time, she leaves this location as well and goes to a nightclub. Interspersed throughout are shots of Chicago at night and Fischer singing the song at different locations. She is dressed differently at each location, showcasing a total of six outfits. The video runs for 3 minutes and 37 seconds and was directed by Oliver Sommer.

== Other versions ==
Kristina Bach, the composer of "Atemlos durch die Nacht", also released a version of this song in English sung by herself. This version is known as "Take a Breath". The music video for this version was shot in Rome.

The song was also covered in Dutch as "Ademloos door de nacht", by Loona and Ferry de Lits in the Netherlands; as "Jij en ik", by Laura Lynn in Belgium; as well as in Afrikaans as "Asemloos" by Liezel Pieters in South Africa. It was also parodied by Austrian punk band Turbobier as "Arbeitslos durch den Tag" (Unemployed Through the Day) in 2015.

The melody was also used as an interval act during the second-semi-final of Melodifestivalen 2016 performed by Swedish singer Charlotte Perrelli as "Här står jag" (Here I Stand), a Swedish-language metasong referring to the decline in success of Schlager music during Melodifestivalen.

In 2018, the DJ Black Noize made a remix of this song in the hardstyle style. In 2023, the song was remixed by female rapper Shirin David, which eventually became the only version of the song to top the German charts.

In the thirteenth season of The Voice of Holland, the song was covered by Steffany Markovits. The live recording is featured on the album The Blind Auditions #6 (Seizoen 13), which was digitally released on 20 February 2026.

== Track listings ==
- Maxi-single
1. "Atemlos Durch Die Nacht" (Bassflow Main Radio/Video Mix) – 3:38
2. "Atemlos Durch Die Nacht" ("The Pope" Remix) – 3:41
3. "Atemlos Durch Die Nacht" (Bassflow Alternative Remake Edit) – 3:37
4. "Atemlos Durch Die Nacht" (Album Version) – 3:39
5. "Atemlos Durch Die Nacht" (A Class Kuduro Floor Mix) – 5:11
6. "Atemlos Durch Die Nacht" (Florian Paetzold Remix) – 5:02
7. "Atemlos Durch Die Nacht" (Sean Finn Remix) – 5:30
- Remix EP – The Extended Remixes
1. "Atemlos Durch Die Nacht" (Bassflow Extended Main Remake) 06:31
2. "Atemlos Durch Die Nacht" (Bassflow Extended Alternative Remake) 06:30
3. "Atemlos Durch Die Nacht" (Sean Finn Remix) 05:30
4. "Atemlos Durch Die Nacht" (Florian Paetzold Remix) 05:02
5. "Atemlos Durch Die Nacht" (A Class Kuduro Floor Mix) 05:11
6. "Atemlos Durch Die Nacht" (A Class Dance Floor Mix) 04:55
7. "Atemlos Durch Die Nacht" (A Class Spheric Floor Mix) 05:03
- iTunes EP – The Radio Mixes
1. "Atemlos Durch Die Nacht" (Bassflow Main Radio/Video Mix) – 3:38
2. "Atemlos Durch Die Nacht" ("The Pope" Remix) – 3:41
3. "Atemlos Durch Die Nacht" (Bassflow Alternative Remake Edit) – 3:37
4. "Atemlos Durch Die Nacht" (Sean Finn Remix) – 5:30
5. "Atemlos Durch Die Nacht" (A Class Kuduro Edit) 03:36
6. "Atemlos Durch Die Nacht" (A Class Dance Edit) 03:36
7. "Atemlos Durch Die Nacht" (A Class Spheric Floor Edit) 03:38*
8. "Atemlos Durch Die Nacht" (Album Version) – 3:39

== Credits and personnel ==
- Michael Bestmann – mastering, mixing
- Julian Feifel – background vocals
- Jean Frankfurter – keyboards, programming, producer
- Franco Leon – background vocals
- Birney Oberreit – background vocals
- Kareena Schönberger – background vocals
- Peter Weihe – guitar

Credits adapted from Farbenspiel album liner notes.

== Charts and certifications ==
=== Weekly charts ===
Chart (2013–2023)	Peak position
Austria (Ö3 Austria Top 40)	1
Belgium (Ultratip Bubbling Under Flanders)	26
Euro Digital Songs (Billboard)	20
Germany (GfK)	1
Luxembourg Digital Songs (Billboard)	4
Switzerland (Schweizer Hitparade)	2

Chart (2021)	Peak position
Netherlands Single Tip (MegaCharts)	8

=== Year-end charts ===
Chart (2014)	Position
Austria (Ö3 Austria Top 40)	1
Germany (Media Control Charts)	1
Switzerland (Schweizer Hitparade)	4
Chart (2015)	Position
Germany (Official German Charts)	50

=== Decade-end charts ===
Chart (2010–2019)	Position
Germany (Official German Charts)	3

=== All-time charts ===
Chart	Position
Austria (Ö3 Austria Top 40)	2
Germany (Media Control Charts)	2

=== Certifications ===
Region	Certification	Certified units/sales
Austria (IFPI Austria)	6× Platinum	180,000^{*}
Germany (BVMI)	4× Platinum	2,400,000^{‡}
Switzerland (IFPI Switzerland)	Platinum	30,000^{^}
^{*} Sales figures based on certification alone.^{^} Shipments figures based on certification alone.^{‡} Sales+streaming figures based on certification alone.

== See also ==
- List of number-one hits of 2014 (Austria)
