= Weihnachten (album) =

Studio album by Helene Fischer
- Released: 13 November 2015
- Recorded: 2015
- Genre: Christmas; pop
- Label: Polydor
- Producer: Alex Christensen

Helene Fischer chronology
Farbenspiel (2013)	Weihnachten (2015)	Helene Fischer (2017)

Singles from Weihnachten
- 1. "Fröhliche Weihnacht überall" Released: 13 November 2015; 2. "Rudolph the Red-Nosed Reindeer" Released: 13 November 2015; 3. "The Power of Love" Released: 7 December 2015

Weihnachten (German: Christmas) is the seventh studio album by German singer Helene Fischer. It was released on 13 November 2015 by Polydor. The album was supported by the Royal Philharmonic Orchestra.

== Track listing ==
Disc 1: Weihnachten – Standard edition
No.	Title	Length
1.	"Stille Nacht"	4:23
2.	"O du fröhliche"	3:33
3.	"Ihr Kinderlein, kommet"	4:04
4.	"Fröhliche Weihnacht überall"	2:29
5.	"Alle Jahre wieder"	3:06
6.	"Süßer die Glocken nie klingen" (featuring Xavier Naidoo)	3:23
7.	"Vom Himmel hoch, da komm ich her"	3:22
8.	"Lasst uns froh und munter sein"	3:04
9.	"Leise rieselt der Schnee"	3:19
10.	"Maria durch ein Dornwald ging"	3:07
11.	"Adeste Fideles"	3:55
12.	"Tochter Zion, freue dich"	3:05
13.	"Am Weihnachtsbaum die Lichter brennen"	3:01
14.	"In der Weihnachtsbäckerei"	4:01
15.	"O Tannenbaum"	2:38
16.	"Es ist ein Ros entsprungen"	2:41
17.	"Heilige Nacht"	4:03
18.	"Ave Maria"	5:16

Disc 1: Weinachten – Deluxe edition
No.	Title	Length
19.	"Kling, Glöckchen, klingelingeling"	2:31
20.	"Aba Heidschi Bumbeidschi" (with Heintje)	3:19
21.	"Schneeflöckchen, Weißröckchen"	2:46
22.	"Still, still, still"	2:31

Disc 2: Weihnachten – Standard edition
No.	Title	Length
1.	"White Christmas" (featuring Bing Crosby)	3:11
2.	"Winter Wonderland"	2:51
3.	"Rudolph the Red-Nosed Reindeer"	2:57
4.	"Let It Snow"	2:27
5.	"Have Yourself a Merry Little Christmas" (featuring Frank Sinatra)	4:00
6.	"Little Drummer Boy"	3:05
7.	"We Wish You a Merry Christmas"	2:13
8.	"What Child Is This" (featuring Plácido Domingo)	3:52
9.	"The Power of Love"	4:03
10.	"Driving Home for Christmas"	4:13
11.	"Last Christmas" (featuring Ricky Martin)	3:55
12.	"Santa Claus Is Coming to Town"	2:28
13.	"Jingle Bells"	2:26
14.	"Feliz Navidad"	3:33
15.	"The Christmas Song"	3:52
16.	"Hallelujah"	4:33
17.	"I'll Be Home for Christmas"	3:42

Disc 2: Weihnachten – Deluxe edition
No.	Title	Length
18.	"All I Want for Christmas Is You"	3:02
19.	"Santa Baby"	3:31
20.	"Sleigh Ride"	3:16
21.	"The First Noel"	4:11

== Charts ==
=== Weekly charts ===
Chart (2015)	Peak position
Austrian Albums (Ö3 Austria)	1
Belgian Albums (Ultratop Flanders)	12
Belgian Albums (Ultratop Wallonia)	181
Danish Albums (Hitlisten)	8
Dutch Albums (Album Top 100)	22
German Albums (Offizielle Top 100)	1
Swiss Albums (Schweizer Hitparade)	2

=== Year-end charts ===
Chart (2015)	Position
Austrian Albums (Ö3 Austria)	1
Belgian Albums (Ultratop Flanders)	153
German Albums (Offizielle Top 100)	1
Swiss Albums (Schweizer Hitparade)	8
Chart (2016)	Position
Austrian Albums (Ö3 Austria)	5
German Albums (Offizielle Top 100)	4
Swiss Albums (Schweizer Hitparade)	5
Chart (2017)	Position
German Albums (Offizielle Top 100)	49
Swiss Albums (Schweizer Hitparade)	19
Chart (2019)	Position
German Albums (Offizielle Top 100)	99

=== Decade-end charts ===
Chart (2010–2019)	Position
German Albums (Offizielle Top 100)	3

== Certifications and sales ==
Region	Certification	Certified units/sales
Austria (IFPI Austria)	8× Platinum	120,000^{*}
Germany (BVMI)	6× Platinum	1,200,000^{‡}
^{*} Sales figures based on certification alone.^{‡} Sales+streaming figures based on certification alone.
