= Farbenspiel =

Studio album by Helene Fischer
- Released: 4 October 2013
- Recorded: 2013
- Genre: Schlager; pop
- Label: Polydor
- Producer: Jean Frankfurter

Helene Fischer chronology
Für einen Tag (2011)	Farbenspiel (2013)	Weihnachten (2015)

Singles from Farbenspiel
- 1. "Fehlerfrei" Released: 20 September 2013; 2. "Atemlos durch die Nacht" Released: 29 November 2013; 3. "Marathon" Released: 6 June 2014

Farbenspiel (German: Game of Colors) is the sixth studio album by German singer Helene Fischer. It was released on 4 October 2013 by Polydor.

With over 2.7 million copies sold worldwide, Farbenspiel is one of the best-selling German albums of all time. Farbenspiel won the Echo Music Prize for Album of the Year in 2014 and 2015.

== Track listing ==
Farbenspiel – Standard edition
No.	Title	Writer(s)	Producer(s)	Length
1.	"Fehlerfrei"	Jean Frankfurter; Tobias Reitz	Frankfurter	3:39
2.	"Mit keinem Andern"	Frankfurter; Joachim Horn-Bernges	Frankfurter	3:44
3.	"So kann das Leben sein"	Frankfurter; Kristina Bach	Frankfurter	4:04
4.	"Marathon"	Frankfurter; Horn-Bernges	Frankfurter	3:49
5.	"Atemlos durch die Nacht"	Bach	Frankfurter	3:42
6.	"Der Augenblick"	Frankfurter; Reitz	Frankfurter	2:50
7.	"Te quiero"	Roland Spremberg; Christoph Papendieck; Tobias Röger; Marcus Brosch; Michael Ochs; Emily Joe Green	Frankfurter	3:40
8.	"Captain meiner Seele"	Frankfurter; Horn-Bernges	Frankfurter	3:39
9.	"In diesen Nächten"	Frankfurter; Peter Plate; Ulf Leo Sommer	Frankfurter	4:22
10.	"Feuerwerk"	Frankfurter; Bach	Frankfurter	2:56
11.	"Ehrlich und klar"	Frankfurter; Reitz	Frankfurter	4:05
12.	"Wunder dich nicht"	Frankfurter; Reitz	Frankfurter	3:59
13.	"Auf der Suche nach mir"	Frankfurter; Bach	Frankfurter	4:11
14.	"Alice im Wunderland"	Frankfurter; Bach	Frankfurter	4:01
15.	"Unser Tag"	Plate; Sommer; Christopher Applegate	Frankfurter	3:38
16.	"Ein kleines Glück"	Oliver Pinelli; Der Graf; Markus Tumbült	Frankfurter	3:40

Farbenspiel – Special edition
No.	Title	Writer(s)	Producer(s)	Length
17.	"Weit über’s Meer" (featuring Santiano)	Vladimir Cosma	Hardy and Mark	3:14
18.	"How Am I Supposed to Live Without You" (with Michael Bolton)	Bolton; Doug James	Frankfurter	4:47

== Charts ==
=== Weekly charts ===
Chart (2013)	Peak position
Austrian Albums (Ö3 Austria)	1
Belgian Albums (Ultratop Flanders)	14
Danish Albums (Hitlisten)	4
Dutch Albums (Album Top 100)	8
German Albums (Offizielle Top 100)	1
Swiss Albums (Schweizer Hitparade)	1

=== Year-end charts ===
Chart (2013)	Position
Austrian Albums (Ö3 Austria)	2
Belgian Albums (Ultratop Flanders)	108
Dutch Albums (Album Top 100)	100
German Albums (Offizielle Top 100)	1
Swiss Albums (Schweizer Hitparade)	6
Chart (2014)	Position
Austrian Albums (Ö3 Austria)	1
Belgian Albums (Ultratop Flanders)	151
German Albums (Offizielle Top 100)	1
Swiss Albums (Schweizer Hitparade)	1
Chart (2015)	Position
Austrian Albums (Ö3 Austria)	2
German Albums (Offizielle Top 100)	4
Swiss Albums (Schweizer Hitparade)	6
Chart (2016)	Position
Austrian Albums (Ö3 Austria)	19
German Albums (Offizielle Top 100)	36
Swiss Albums (Schweizer Hitparade)	67
Chart (2017)	Position
Austrian Albums (Ö3 Austria)	29
German Albums (Offizielle Top 100)	68
Chart (2018)	Position
Austrian Albums (Ö3 Austria)	56

=== Decade-end charts ===
Chart (2010–2019)	Position
German Albums (Offizielle Top 100)	1

== Certifications and sales ==
Region	Certification	Certified units/sales
Austria (IFPI Austria)	18× Platinum	360,000^{*}
Germany (BVMI)	13× Platinum	2,600,000^{‡}
Switzerland (IFPI Switzerland)	4× Platinum	80,000^{^}
^{*} Sales figures based on certification alone.^{^} Shipments figures based on certification alone.^{‡} Sales+streaming figures based on certification alone.
