= Andreas Gabalier =

Austrian folk singer

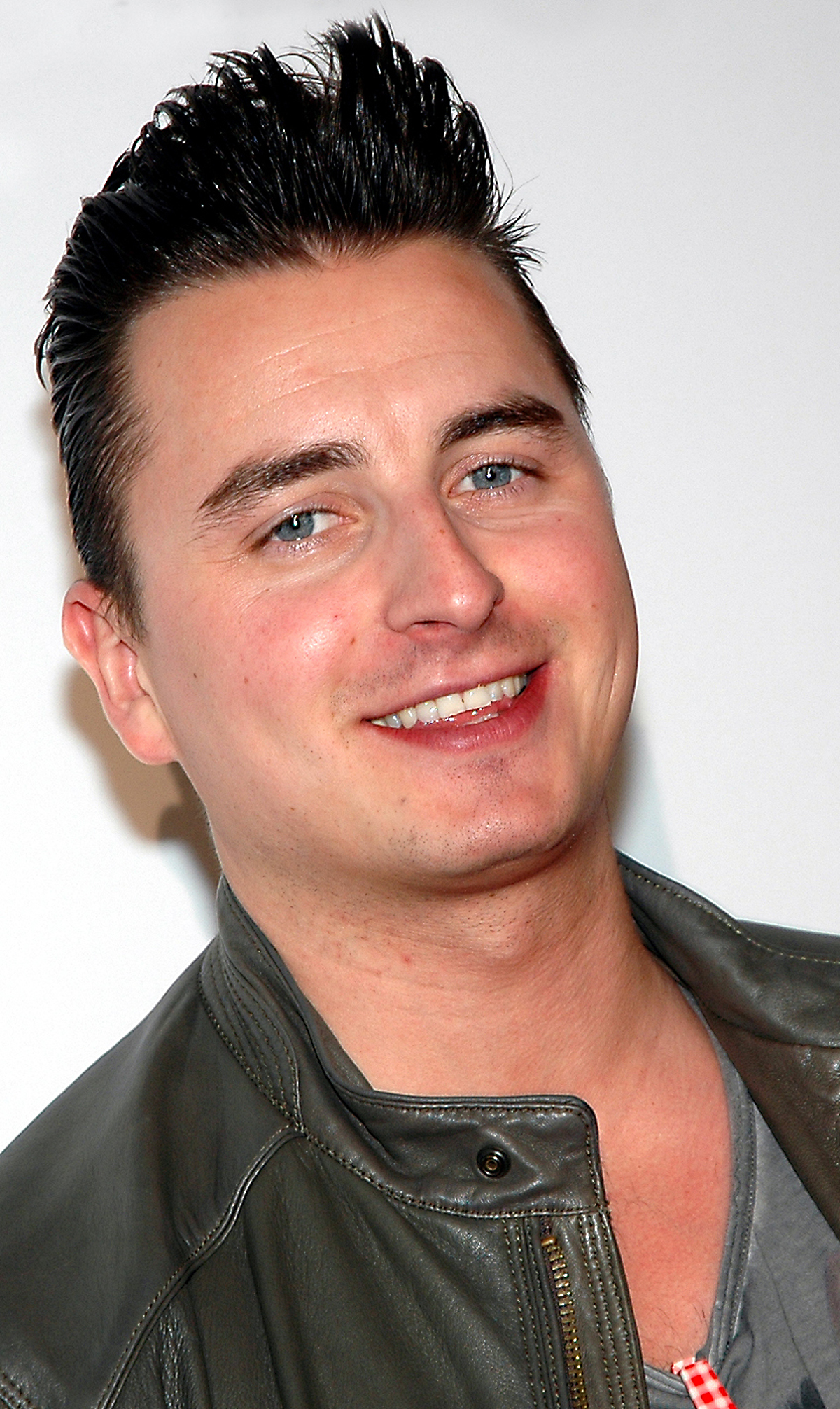
- Gabalier in 2014

Background information
- Born: 21 November 1984 (age 41); Friesach, Austria
- Genres: Austrian-folk; Rock; Schlager; Europop
- Occupation: Singer
- Instrument: Vocals
- Years active: 2009 – present
- Website: www.andreas-gabalier.at

Andreas Gabalier (born next to Friesach on 21 November 1984) is an Austrian folk and Rock and roll singer.

== Family and private life ==
Andreas Gabalier is the second oldest of the four children of Wilhelm and Huberta Gabalier. He grew up in Graz. In addition to tournament dancer Willi Gabalier he has one younger brother. The French family name Gabalier comes from a soldier who came to Austria in 1796 in the course of the Italian campaign by Napoleon Bonaparte and remained there.

Gabalier's father died of suicide in 2006, and his younger sister in 2008. The song Amoi seg' ma uns wieder (We will see each other again sometime) is dedicated to them. From 2013 to September 2019, Gabalier was in a relationship with the Austrian moderator Silvia Schneider.

== Career ==
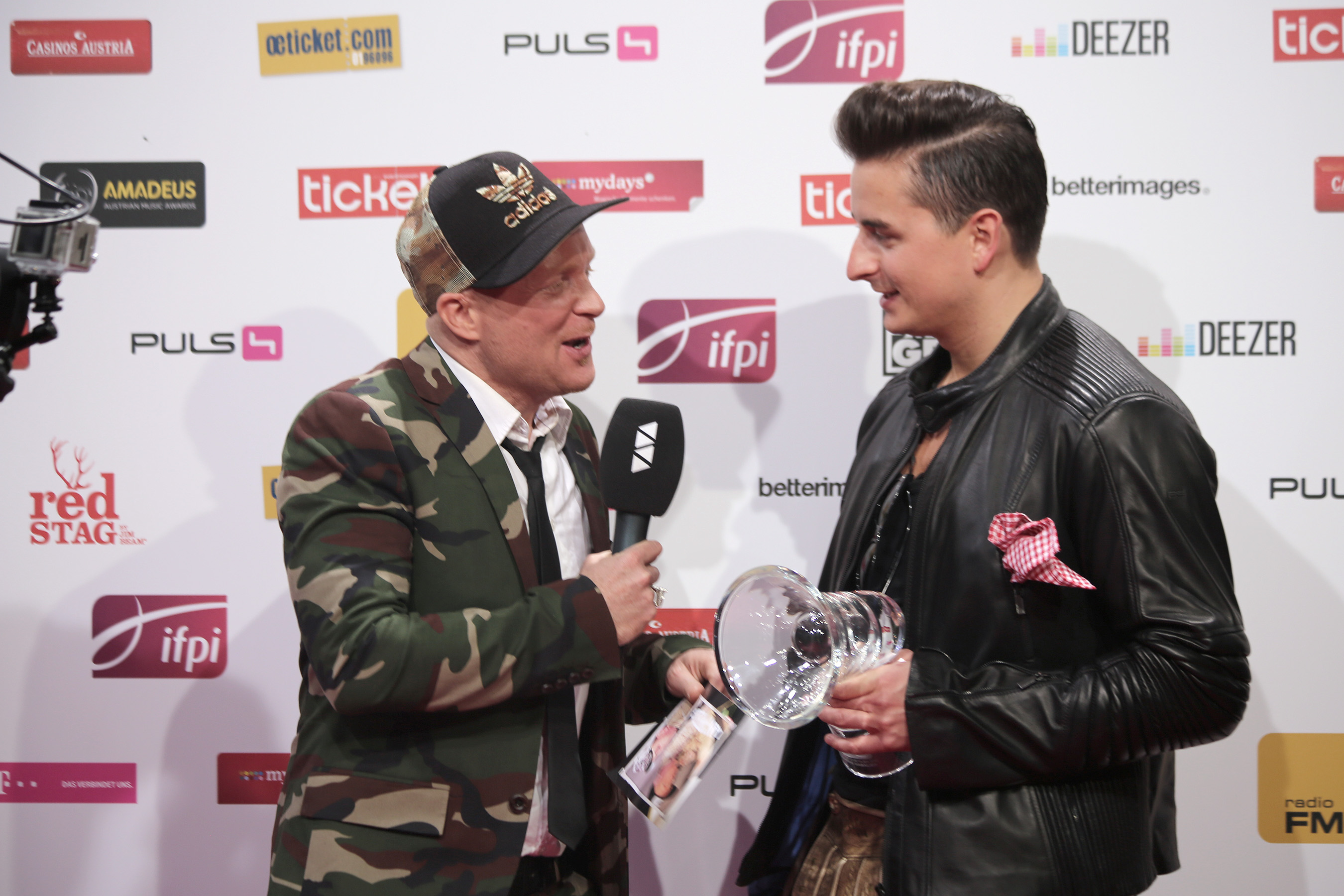
Andreas Gabalier after receiving the Amadeus Award in 2013

After graduating from commercial high school (HAK) Gabalier began his study of law in Graz. He writes and composes his own songs. His first works were recorded in a hobby studio. In the summer of 2008, Gabalier, then still a law student, presented two of his songs to the ORF Landesstudio Steiermark.

== Discography ==
=== Albums ===
Studio albums

Year	Album	Peak positions			Certifications
Year	Album	AUT	GER	SWI	Certifications
2009	Da komm ich her	4	33	19	IFPI AUT: 5× Platinum; BVMI: Gold
2010	Herzwerk	1	31	23	IFPI AUT: 8× Platinum; BVMI: Platinum
2011	Volks-Rock'n'Roller	1	19	35	IFPI AUT: 8× Platinum
2012	Home Sweet Home	1	4	2	IFPI AUT: 6× Platinum; BVMI: Gold
2015	Mountain Man	1	1	1	IFPI AUT: 3× Platinum; BVMI: Gold
2018	Vergiss mein nicht	1	1	1	IFPI AUT: Platinum; BVMI: Gold
2022	Ein neuer Anfang	1	2	2	

Live albums

Year	Album	Peak positions			Certifications
Year	Album	AUT	GER	SWI	Certifications
2012	Volks-Rock'n'Roller Live	1	11	16	BVMI: Platinum
2014	Home Sweet Home Live – Olympiahalle München	—	—	—	
2016	Mountain Man – Live aus Berlin	—	—	—	
2016	MTV Unplugged	1	2	3	

Compilations

Year	Album	Peak positions		
Year	Album	AUT	GER	SWI
2019	Best of Volks-Rock'n'Roller	1	1	3

Christmas Albums

Year	Album	Peak positions		
Year	Album	AUT	GER	SWI
2020	A Volks-Rock'n'Roll Christmas	1	3	2

=== Singles ===
Year	Single	Peak positions			Certifications	Album
Year	Single	AUT	GER	SWI	Certifications	Album
2008	"Amoi seg' ma uns wieder"	—	—	—		Da komm ich her
2009	"So liab hob i di"	20	70	39		Da komm ich her
2009	"Es ist die Zeit"	20	—	—		Da komm ich her
2011	"I sing a Liad für di"	9	30	31		Herzwerk
2011	"Sweet Little Rehlein"	5	—	—		Volks-Rock'n'Roller
2013	"Go for Gold"	1	—	—		Home Sweet Home
2013	"Zuckerpuppen"	29	82	—		Home Sweet Home
2014	"Amoi seg’ ma uns wieder" (re-release)	3	9	6		
2014	"Dieser Weg"	50	—	—		Sing meinen Song - Das Tauschkonzert (Sampler)
2015	"Mountain Man"	7	—	—		Mountain Man
2015	"Verliebt, verliebt"	54	—	—		Mountain Man
2015	"Hulapalu"	10	13	4		Mountain Man
2018	"Verdammt lang her"	19	76	33		Vergiss mein nicht
2019	"Pump It Up (The Motivation Song)" (featuring Arnold Schwarzenegger)	67	—	—		
2020	"Neuer Wind"	22	—	51		
