= Lilly Wood and the Prick =

French folk pop duo

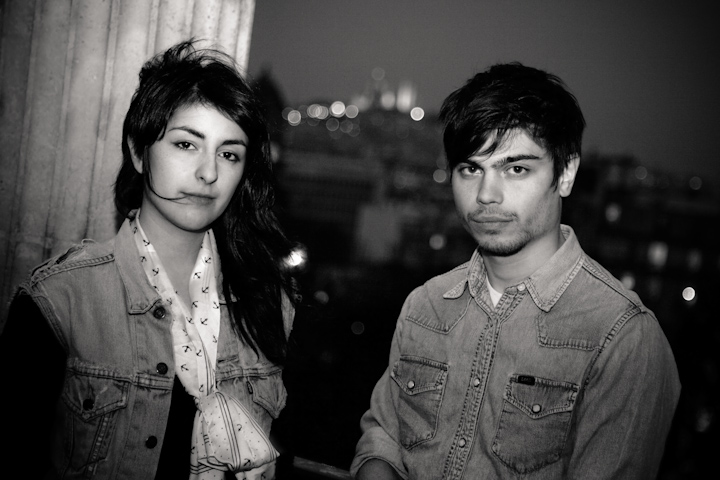
- Lilly Wood and the Prick in 2010

Background information
- Also known as: Lillywood; Lilly Wood
- Origin: Paris, France
- Genre: Folk-pop
- Years active: 2006–present
- Members: Nili Hadida; Benjamin Cotto

Lilly Wood and the Prick (also known simply as Lilly Wood and Lillywood) is a French folk-pop duo composed of Nili Hadida and Benjamin Cotto. They are best known for their single "Prayer in C", which gained popularity after being remixed by German DJ Robin Schulz.

== History ==
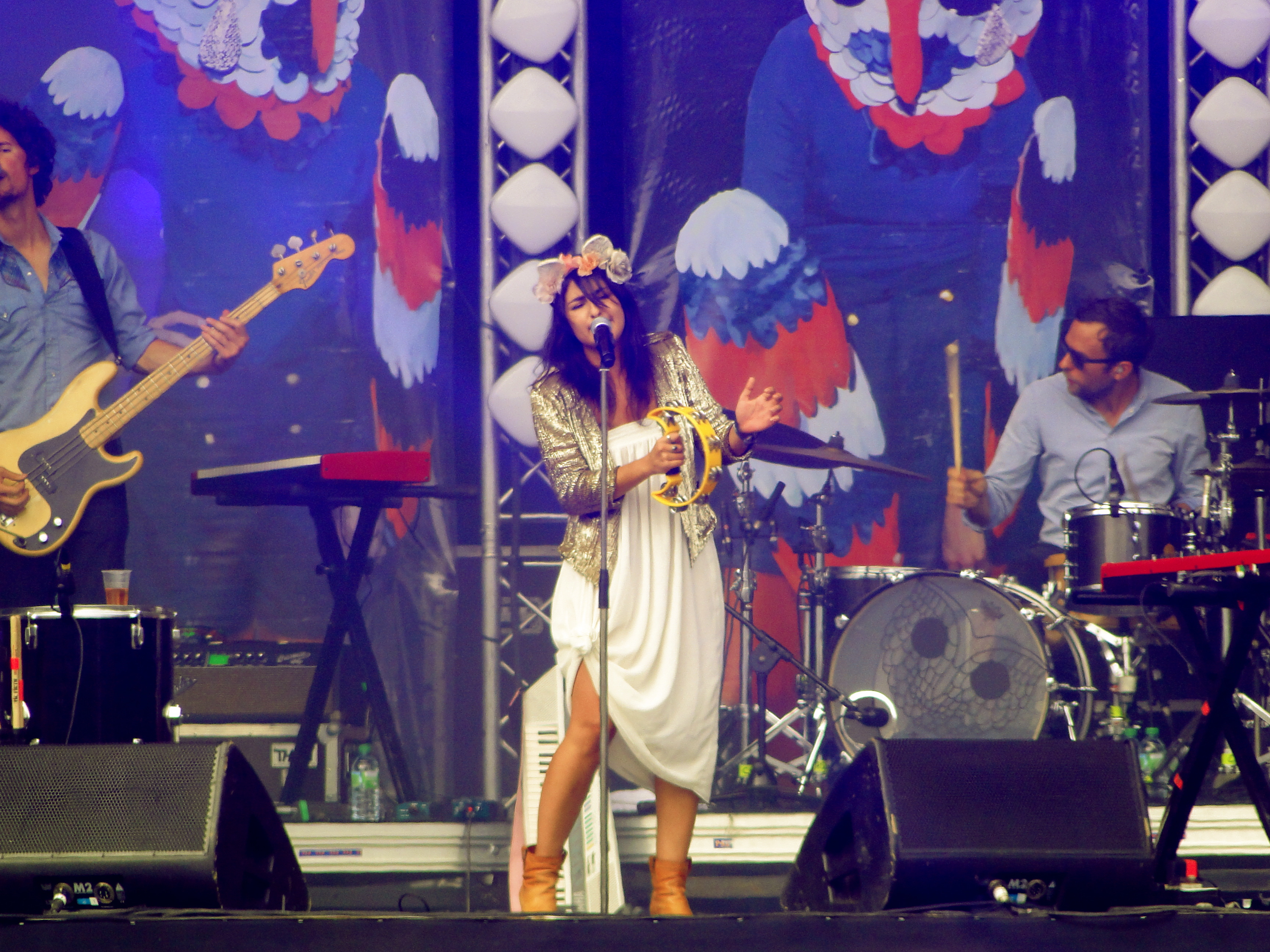
Lilly Wood and The Prick at Rock en Seine Festival, Paris, 2011

=== 2006: Formation ===
The duo was formed in 2006 when they met in a Parisian café and decided to collaborate on writing songs together.

=== 2008–2009: Lilly Who and the What? ===
After collaborating on a number of songs, in 2008 they made a cover of "L.E.S. Artistes" from Santigold. They also met guitarist Pierre Guimard who heard their songs on Myspace and offered to work with them and opened his studio for production of their work. 2008 saw release of their track on a compilation entitled Folk & Proud followed, in 2009, by the EP of the duo Lilly Who and the What? referring to the stage name of the duo. It was released on Choke Industry independent label founded by Pierre Guimard and by Matthieu Tessier, the duo's manager. After 2009, they signed with another independent label called Cinq7.

=== 2010–2013: Invincible Friends and The Fight ===
Their first studio album Invincible Friends was released on 31 May 2010. On 9 February 2011, they were nominated for "revelation of the public" award for the Victoires de la Musique. On the official ceremony held on 1 March and broadcast on France 2, TV5 Monde and France Inter they won against competition in the same category from Ben l'Oncle Soul, Camélia Jordana, Zaz, Féfé, Guillaume Grand, Florent Marchet and Okou. They also engaged on a tour including one at Olympia Paris on 1 June 2011. Their follow up album was The Fight released on 5 November 2012. In 2013, they came to the cinema with a movie called Lilly Wood and The Prick au Trianon directed by Benjamin Lemaire.

=== 2014–2016: "Prayer in C" and Shadows ===
In June 2014 they released the single for "Prayer in C", a track originally included in their 2010 album, Invincible Friends. German DJ and producer Robin Schulz remixed the song bringing with it success across Europe. The success of the song helped propel the duo into their highest charting solo song in France in 2015 with a song called "I Love You" peaking at number 65. They released their album Shadows along with two other singles, "Box of Noise" and a studio session of "Kokomo" in 2016.

=== 2020–present: Most Anything ===
In 2020 they returned with the ballad "Lonely Life" during the COVID-19 pandemic and later announced their new album titled Most Anything, an album from which they released the singles "You Want My Money" "A Song" & "In Love for the Last Time". The album is characterized for being experimental and with new rhythms compared to their previous works.

Time after that they released the Spanish version of "You Want My Money" stylized as (Quieres mi plata).

== Members ==
=== Official members ===
- Nili Hadida – lead vocals (2006–present)
- Benjamin Cotto – guitars (2006–present)

=== Current touring members ===
- Pierre Guimard – guitars, bass (2010–present)
- Mathias Fisch – drums (2010–present)
- Mathieu Genis – bass, keyboards (2011–present)

=== Former touring members ===
- Clément Fonio – bass (2010–2011)

== Discography ==
=== Albums ===
Title	Details	Peak positions		
Title	Details	FRA	BEL (Wa)	SWI
Invincible Friends	Released: 31 May 2010; Labels: Wagram Music; Formats: Digital download, CD	30	177	92
The Fight	Released: 5 November 2012; Labels: Wagram Music; Formats: Digital download, CD	16	81	—
Shadows	Released: 13 November 2015; Labels: Wagram Music; Formats: Digital download, CD	35	194	—
Most Anything	Released: 21 May 2021; Labels: Wagram Music / Cinq 7; Formats: Digital download, CD	84	—	—
Christina	Released: 23 january 2026; Labels: Wagram Music / Cinq 7; Formats: Digital download, Vinyl, CD	154	—	—
"—" denotes an album that did not chart or was not released in that territory.

=== Extended plays ===
Title	Details
Lilly Who and the What?	Released: 2009; Labels: Choke; Formats: Digital download, CD

=== Singles ===
Single	Year	Peak positions											Certifications	Album
Single	Year	FRA	AUS	AUT	BEL	DEN	GER	NL	SWE	SWI	UK	US	Certifications	Album
"Down the Drain"	2011	67	—	—	91	—	—	—	—	—	—	—		Invincible Friends
"This Is a Love Song"	2011	84	—	—	82	—	—	—	—	—	—	—		Invincible Friends
"Middle of the Night"	2012	103	—	—	—	—	—	—	—	—	—	—		The Fight
"Where I Want to Be (California)"	2012	88	—	—	—	—	—	—	—	—	—	—		The Fight
"Long Way Back"	2013	163	—	—	—	—	—	—	—	—	—	—		Non-album singles
"Into Trouble"	2013	78	—	—	—	—	—	—	—	—	—	—		Non-album singles
"Prayer in C" (Robin Schulz Remix)	2014	1	7	1	1	1	1	1	1	1	1	23	BVMI: Diamond; ARIA: 5× Platinum; BPI: 3× Platinum; BRMA: Platinum; FIMI: 5× Platinum; IFPI AUT: Platinum; IFPI DEN: Gold; IPFI SWE: 3× Platinum; IFPI SWI: 3× Platinum; NVPI: Platinum; RIAA: Platinum; RMNZ: 4× Platinum	Prayer
"Prayer in C" (original version)	2014	9	—	—	—	—	—	—	—	—	—	—		Invincible Friends
"Shadows"	2015	165	—	—	—	—	—	—	—	—	—	—		Shadows
"I Love You"	2015	65	—	—	—	—	—	—	—	—	—	—		Shadows
"Kokomo"	2016	111	—	—	—	—	—	—	—	—	—	—		TBA
"—" denotes a single that did not chart or was not released in that territory.

== Awards and nominations ==
=== Berlin Music Video Awards ===
The Berlin Music Video Awards is an international festival that promotes the art of music videos.

Year	Nominated work	Award	Result	Ref.
2026	"Christina"	Best Concept	Nominated	
