= Helene Fischer =

German singer

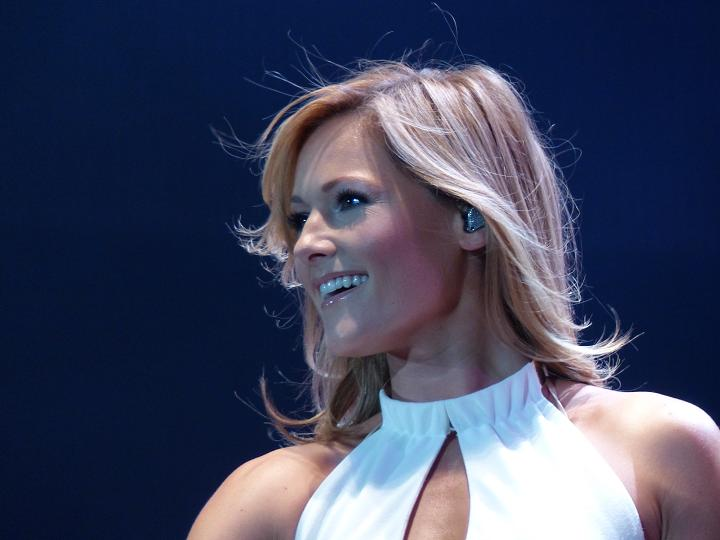
- Stuttgart 2013
- Born: 5 August 1984 (age 42); Krasnoyarsk, Russian SFSR, Soviet Union
- Other name: 'Schlagerkönigin'
- Education: Frankfurt Stage & Musical School
- Occupations: Singer; dancer; entertainer; television presenter; actress
- Years active: 2005–present
- Spouse: Thomas Seitel (m. 2021)
- Partner: Florian Silbereisen (2008–2018)
- Children: 2
- Musical career
- Origin: Wöllstein, Germany
- Genre: Schlager
- Labels: EMI; Universal
- Website: www.helene-fischer.de

Helene Fischer (Note: German pronunciation: [heˈleːnə ˈfɪʃɐ]) (born 5 August 1984) is a German schlager singer. Since her debut in 2005, she has won numerous awards, including 17 Echo awards, four "Die Krone der Volksmusik" awards, and three Bambi awards. She has sold at least 18 million records. In June 2014, her multi-platinum 2013 album Farbenspiel became the most downloaded album ever by a German artist and is the sixth-best-selling album of all time in Germany. Her signature song "Atemlos durch die Nacht" was the best-selling song in Germany in 2014. She has had the best-selling album of the year in Germany five times: in 2013, 2014, 2015, 2017, and 2018. She ranked No. 8 on Forbes' list of "The World's Highest-Paid Women in Music 2018," earning US$ 32 million. Fischer has been referred to as the "Queen of Schlager".

== Early life and career ==
Helene Fischer was born in the Siberian city of Krasnoyarsk, former Russian SFSR, Soviet Union, to Pyotr and Marina Fischer. Her father worked as a physical education teacher, and her mother was an engineer. Her paternal grandparents were Black Sea Germans who were among those sent to forced settlements in Kazakhstan and Siberia. In 1988, at the age of three-and-a-half, she immigrated with her parents and her six-year-old sister to Wöllstein, West Germany.

After graduating from high school, Fischer attended the Frankfurt Stage & Musical School for three years, where she studied singing and acting. During this time, she performed on stage at the Staatstheater Darmstadt, as well as at the Volkstheater Frankfurt.

Fischer's debut on stage occurred on 14 May 2005, in a program by the TV channel ARD. It was a duet with schlager singer Florian Silbereisen. The two later became a couple.

She has won 17 Echo awards, the "Goldene Henne" award seven times, and the "Krone der Volksmusik" prize four times. All her albums and DVDs have achieved multiple gold and double platinum certifications. Her songs, with their stories of the everyday worries and woes of home-loving folks, are lyrically close to what could be called "country music," although musically quite different.

Her fanbase extends beyond Germany, Austria, and Switzerland to Belgium, Canada, the Netherlands, Denmark, Norway, the United Kingdom, Finland, and New Zealand.

She released her first English album, The English Ones, on 7 June 2010. The album was produced by Jean Frankfurter (Erich Ließmann), a German producer, composer, and arranger. On singing in English, Fischer commented: "I have always dreamed of singing my songs in another language. English is the language of country, the music that we call Schlager. Language is a tool, but it is important that what you sing comes from the heart – and that is what this album is about."

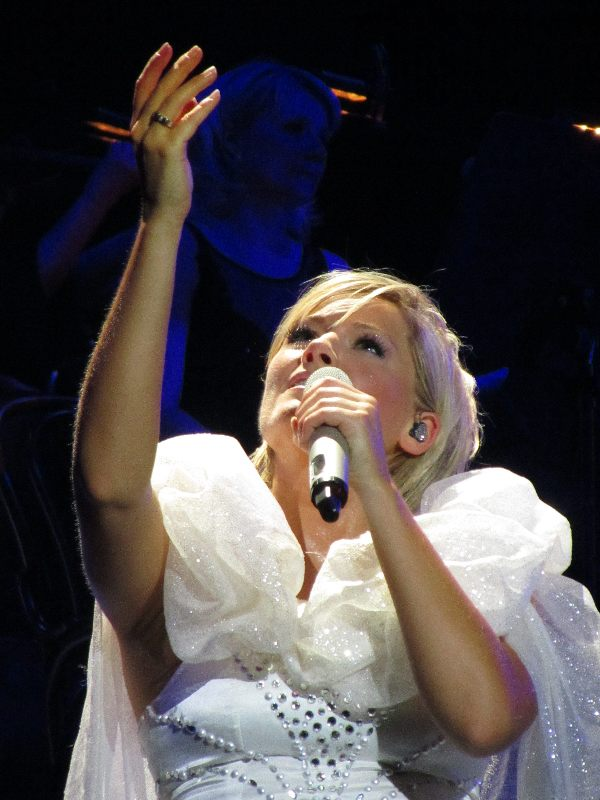
Fischer on tour with orchestra, Vienna 2011

In January 2013, she made her acting debut in an episode of the German TV series Das Traumschiff.

On 4 October 2013, she released her album Farbenspiel in Germany. She went on tour in 2014 and embarked on a major stadium tour in 2015. She performed at the Olympia Stadium in Berlin in front of 120,000 people. The album received platinum certification after just five days in Germany, Denmark, and Austria. Farbenspiel became the most successful release by a German female artist in the first week of release in the past decade. To date, over 2.4 million copies of the album have been sold.

On 13 November 2015, Fischer released a Christmas album entitled Weihnachten. It consists of two CDs, the first featuring Christmas songs sung in German and German dialects, and the second featuring songs sung in English. The album reached number 1 on the year-end charts in both Germany and Austria and received a total of 14 platinum certifications in both countries. It sold over 1.3 million copies.

In 2016, she sang the German version of "How Far I'll Go" ("Ich bin bereit"), the title song from Disney's Moana.

On 12 May 2017, she released her eighth studio album, titled Helene Fischer. It was released by Polydor. The album debuted at number one on the Austrian, German, and Swiss Albums Charts and reached the top ten in the Netherlands and the Flemish region of Belgium. In Germany, Helene Fischer sold more than 300,000 copies in its first week of release, making it the highest-selling debut since Herbert Grönemeyer's 2002 album Mensch. The album won nine platinum certifications in Germany and Austria and has sold over 1 million copies in both countries to date. She performed all her new songs, along with several hits from previous albums, at the Kesselhaus in Munich, and released the album Helene Fischer – Das Konzert aus dem Kesselhaus, showcasing this performance.

In June 2018, she began her second stadium tour, performing in Germany, Switzerland, the Netherlands, and Austria. In several locations on this tour, she performed up to five times in a row. Her show was developed in collaboration with 45 Degrees of Cirque du Soleil. In October 2018, The New York Times ranked Fischer seventh in terms of the world's biggest touring musical acts of the year. In the 2018 Forbes list of top-earning female artists worldwide, she ranked 8th. This also makes her the most successful non-English singer currently.

Fischer performed at the SnowpenAir 2022 Music Festival in Grindelwald Terminal in the Switzerland Alps. There, she sang the Marius Müller-Westernhagen song Freiheit as her response to the most recent Russian invasion of Ukraine and another instance of forced resettlement by Russia. Fischer wore a blue and yellow ribbon in solidarity with Ukraine, tearfully introducing the song by describing the sorrow experienced by Ukrainian families being resettled and torn apart by the war. She performed the song with blue and yellow highlights on the stage.

== Discography ==
=== Studio albums ===
- Von hier bis unendlich (2006)
- So nah wie du (2007)
- Zaubermond (2008)
- So wie ich bin (2009)
- Für einen Tag (2011)
- Farbenspiel (2013)
- Helene Fischer (2017)
- Rausch (2021)
- Wir (2026)

=== Children's music ===
- Die schönsten Kinderlieder (2024)
- Die schönsten Kinderlieder – Tanzen & Feiern (2025)
- Die schönsten Kinderlieder – Winter- und Weihnachtszeit (2025)

=== Christmas albums ===
- Weihnachten (2015)

== Tours ==
- Mut zum Gefühl – Live 2008
- Zum ersten Mal mit Band und Orchester Live (2011)
- Für einen Tag Live (2012)
- Genti King 2013
- Farbenspiel Live (2014/2015)
- Helene Fischer Live 2017/2018
- Die Stadion-Tour 2018
- Rausch Live (2023)
- 360° Stadion Tour (2026)

== Awards ==
=== Bambi ===
- 2013: for Musik national
- 2014: for Entertainment
- 2017: for Musik national

=== Echo ===
- 2009: for Deutschsprachiger Schlager
- 2009: for DVD Produktion des Jahres (Mut zum Gefühl Live)
- 2010: for DVD Produktion national (Zaubermond Live)
- 2012: for Deutschsprachiger Schlager
- 2013: for DVD Produktion national (Für einen Tag – Live 2012)
- 2013: for Deutschsprachiger Schlager
- 2014: for Album des Jahres
- 2014: for Deutschsprachiger Schlager
- 2015: for Schlager
- 2015: for Album des Jahres
- 2015: for Hit des Jahres
- 2015: for Musik-DVD/Blu-Ray national
- 2016: for Musik-DVD/Blu-Ray national (Weihnachten), (Farbenspiel Live)
- 2016: for Album des Jahres
- 2016: for Live-Act national
- 2016: for Crossover
- 2018: for Schlager

=== Goldene Henne ===
- 2007: for Aufsteigerin des Jahres
- 2008: for Musik
- 2010: for Leserpreis Musik
- 2012: for Publikumspreis Musik
- 2014: for Musik
- 2014: Superhenne (Special 20th Anniversary Award)
- 2016: for Musik
- 2020: for Entertainment with Die Helene Fischer Show 2019

=== Goldene Kamera ===
- 2012: for Beste Musik national
- 2016: for Beliebtester deutscher Musik-Act

=== Krone der Volksmusik ===
- 2008: for the Erfolg des Jahres 2007
- 2009: for the Erfolg des Jahres 2008
- 2010: as Erfolgreichste Sängerin 2009
- 2012: as Erfolgreichste Sängerin 2011

=== Romy ===
- 2014: as Beliebteste Moderatorin – Show

=== World Music Awards ===
- 2014: Best-selling German Artist

== Personal life ==
From May 2008, Fischer was in a relationship with Florian Silbereisen. The two were regarded as the "dream couple of German pop music" and frequently became the subject of speculative tabloid headlines. In December 2018, they announced that they had been separated for some time and had remained friends. Fischer later revealed that her new partner was aerial acrobat Thomas Seitel, with whom she collaborates in her stage shows. In December 2021, the couple married and welcomed a daughter. Later that same year, they moved into a house in Inning am Ammersee, where the family has lived ever since. In August 2025, she gave birth to a second daughter.

== Social engagement and political statements ==
Fischer has generally refrained from making political statements in the past. However, she expressed clear opposition to discrimination, racism, hatred, and violence in an interview with the magazine "Stern". She described these as poisonous to society and called for the defense of democratic values, urging people to stand against extremism by participating in elections and resisting intimidation from antidemocratic forces.

Her remarks sparked controversy among her fans, particularly among suspected supporters of the far-right party AfD in Germany, who subsequently spread hateful messages under her Instagram posts and criticized her. On the other hand, she also received support for her outspoken stance against racism and antidemocratic propaganda. Some users praised her for publicly taking a stand and positioning herself against the far-right, with some declaring themselves new fans because of her opposition to hatred and intolerance. Fischer is not the only celebrity to have spoken out in the "Stern" magazine.
