= God, Money, War =

Studio album by King Los
- Released: June 23, 2015
- Recorded: 2014–15
- Genre: East Coast hip hop
- Label: After Platinum; 88 Classic; RCA
- Producer: Los (exec.); Puff Daddy (exec.); Ernie Romero (exec.); J. Grand (exec.); Anomaly; BigHeadDez; Bongo; Da Internz; D.A.; DJ Mustard; J-Holt; Mike Free; Rob Holladay

King Los chronology
Zero Gravity II (2014)	God, Money, War (2015)

Singles from God, Money, War
- 1. "War" Released: April 20, 2015; 2. "Can't Fade Us" Released: April 27, 2015; 3. "Ghetto Boy" Released: May 17, 2015; 4. "Glory to the Lord" Released: June 16, 2015

God, Money, War is the debut studio album of American rapper King Los. It was released on June 23, 2015, by After Platinum Records, 88 Classic, and RCA Records. The album was digital release-only and includes guest appearances from Isaiah Rashad, Marsha Ambrosius, R. Kelly, Ty Dolla $ign, Chrishan, among others.

== Commercial performance ==
God, Money, War debuted at number 68 on the Billboard 200 for the chart dated July 11, 2015 with 8,300 equivalent album units; it sold 7,400 copies in its first week, with the remainder of the units reflecting the album's streaming activity and track sales.

== Track listing ==
No.	Title	Writer(s)	Producer(s)	Length
1.	"War" (featuring Marsha Ambrosius)	Carlos Coleman; Ronald Maia; James Maia; Clapp Carnegie; William Tyler; Marcos Palacios; Ernest Clark; Marsha Ambrosius	Anomaly; Da Internz^{[a]}	5:00
2.	"Ghetto Boy"	Coleman; Palacios; Clark; Kevin Randolph; Tony Russell; Uforo Ebong	Da Internz; Bongo	2:44
3.	"Black and White (Interlude)" (featuring Poo Bear)	Coleman; Palacios; Clark; Randolph; Russell; Ebong; Jason Boyd	Da Internz; Bongo^{[a]}	1:02
4.	"God Money War"	Coleman; Palacios; Clark; Chazwick Bundick; Robert Watson	Da Internz; Rob Holladay	4:08
5.	"Lil Black Boy"	Coleman; Palacios; Clark; Randolph	Da Internz	3:30
6.	"Black Blood" (featuring Isaiah Rashad and Kent Jamz)	Coleman; Jordan Holt; Shama Joseph; Mele Monroe; Isaiah McClain; Khalid Muhammad	J-Holt	4:44
7.	"Glory to the Lord" (featuring R. Kelly)	Coleman; Palacios; Clark; Randolph; Russell; Robert Kelly	Da Internz	4:30
8.	"Can't Fade Us" (featuring Ty Dolla Sign)	Coleman; Christopher Washington; Dijon McFarlane; Mikely Adam; Tyrone Griffin, Jr.	DJ Mustard; Mike Free^{[a]}	3:45
9.	"Blame It on the Money"	Coleman; Palacios; Clark; Randolph; Andre Brown; Tyrone Kelsie; Eric McIntosh; @bennywond3r	@bennywond3r; Da Internz^{[a]}	3:39
10.	"To Be Honest" (featuring Khalil and Mele Monroe)	Coleman; Palacios; Clark; Randolph; Ebong; Monroe; Khalil Sharieff	Da Internz; Bongo^{[a]}	4:13
11.	"Confidence" (featuring Chrishan)	Coleman; Matt Beck; Alex Brofsky; Christopher Dotson; David Doman	D.A.	4:15
12.	"Slave" (featuring Eskeerdo)	Coleman; Palacios; Clark; Alexander Izquierdo	Da Internz	2:54
13.	"Balance Is Good" (featuring Lola Monroe)	Coleman; Palacios; Clark; Russell; Fershgenet Melaku	Da Internz	3:44
14.	"King" (featuring Diddy and Mark Battles)	Coleman; Palacios; Clark; Randolph; Russell; Peterson; Sean Combs; Mark Battles	@bennywond3r; Da Internz^{[a]}	3:28
Total length:				51:38

Notes

- ^{^[a]} signifies a co-producer.
