= Dot N Pro =

American record production duo

- Origin: New York City, New York, U.S.
- Genres: Hip hop
- Years active: 2011–present
- Label: iHipHop Distribution
- Members: S. Dot; Pro

Dot N Pro (sometimes Dot & Pro), are an American record production duo from New York City, New York consisting of S. Dot and Pro, also known as APro and Pro Da Genius. They have produced for artists including Diddy, Jeremih, 2 Chainz, Tyga, Mack Maine, and DMX.

Before becoming acquainted, they produced on separate hip hop projects, resulting in an inadvertent competition. For instance, they both produced most of the songs on Cory Gunz' mixtapes Best Kept Secret and Youngest In Charge. They subsequently formed the duo after recognizing their joint talents. In 2011, they appeared on Cory Gunz' MTV docu-series, Son of a Gun. They also produced the theme song for the show, and musically directed the live series finale.

== Production credits ==
As Dot N Pro
Song	Year	Artist(s)	Album
"One of a Kind (Mob With My Mob)"	2011	Cory Gunz	Son of a Gun
"Young Mula"	2011	Cory Gunz	Son of a Gun
"Outta My Mind"	2011	Cory Gunz	Son of a Gun
"Speed"	2011	Cory Gunz	Son of a Gun
"YMA"	2011	Cory Gunz, Gudda Gudda, Mack Maine, Short Dawg	Son of a Gun
"YMCMB MMG"	2011	Cory Gunz, Meek Mill	Son of a Gun
"House Party"	2011	Cory Gunz	Son of a Gun
"East 2 Da Westside"	2011	Cory Gunz, Schoolboy Q	Son of a Gun
"Ya'll Ain't Got Nothin' On Me"	2011	Cory Gunz, 2 Chainz	Son of a Gun
"Family Like A Business"	2011	Cory Gunz	Son of a Gun
"Hardbody"	2011	Cory Gunz	Son of a Gun
"Ghost Town"	2011	Cory Gunz	Son of a Gun
"Drink"	2011	Cory Gunz	Son of a Gun
"Know My Name"	2011	Cory Gunz	Son of a Gun
"Dope Game"	2011	Cory Gunz	Son of a Gun
"Str8 Drop"	2011	Cory Gunz, Young Hash	AC3 Volume 1
"Past Life"	2011	Lil Twist, Chris Richardson	The Golden Child
"Disappointed"	2012	King Los, Diddy, Ludacris	Becoming King
"My Biz"	2012	King Los	Becoming King
"Hard Life"	2012	King Los	Becoming King
"Nightmares Of Being Broke"	2012	King Los, Raheem Devaughn	Becoming King
"The Weekend"	2013	Maleek, Lil Chuckee	non-album single
"Don't Wanna Be Right"	2013	Amina Buddafly	I Am, Pt. 2
"Never Let It Slip"	2013	Nemesis, Kalculus	Not a Man, But a Monster
"Intro"	2013	Cory Gunz	Datz WTF I'm Talkin' Bout
"Feelat"	2013	Cory Gunz, Mack Maine	Datz WTF I'm Talkin' Bout
"I Try"	2013	Cory Gunz, Sean Hayz	Datz WTF I'm Talkin' Bout
"I'm Laughin'" (produced with Da GOAT)	2013	Cory Gunz, Wiz Khalifa	Datz WTF I'm Talkin' Bout
"Voices In My Head"	2013	Cory Gunz	Datz WTF I'm Talkin' Bout
"Outro"	2013	Cory Gunz, Charlie Rock	Datz WTF I'm Talkin' Bout
"Last Night"	2013	D Mac, Choppazoe Zoe, Jahlissa Sings	Drug Heavy II
"What They Die For"	2014	Fred the Godson, Jaquae	Fat Boy Fresh
"Creator"	2014	King Los, JS	Zero Gravity II
"Don't Get In My Way"	2014	King Los, Royce Da 5'9, Shanica Knowles	Zero Gravity II
"Trap House"	2014	King Los	Zero Gravity II
"Only Nigga Left"	2014	King Los	Zero Gravity II
"Pilot" (produced with Shamtrax and Ky Miller)	2014	50 Cent	Animal Ambition
"Come Up"	2014	G-Unit	—N/a
"Pyrex"	2014	Lil Twist, Cory Gunz	The Golden Child 2
"Middle Fingers"	2014	Reign	—N/a
"Best Kept Secret"	2015	Tiara Thomas	Bad Influence
"Broke"	2015	Lil Twist, Foolie Fame	—N/a
"Free Throw" (produced with Mixx)	2015	King Los	God Money War

== Filmography ==
Television
Year	Title	Role	Notes
2011	Son of a Gun	Themselves	Cameo/support role
