= Zero Gravity II =

Mixtape by Los
- Released: March 24, 2014
- Genres: Hip hop; R&B
- Length: 74:71
- Label: After Platinum
- Producers: Los; Hunter Bressan; Dot N Pro; Devin Cruise; J. Oliver; Hitmaka; Erick Merkinson; Peter Pan; Polo Bandit

Los chronology
Becoming King (2013)	Zero Gravity II (2014)	God, Money, War (2015)

Singles from Zero Gravity II
- 1. "Play Too Rough" Released: March 5, 2014

Zero Gravity II is a mixtape by American rapper Los, billed as King Los, released in 2014 on After Platinum Records.

== Background ==
After parting ways with Bad Boy Records, Los began working on a sequel to his 2010 mixtape, Zero Gravity. Los said that his outlook on the new year is namely to motivate, stating, "In 2014 I just intend to inspire a lot of people and motivate a lot of people. Success and all that it comes with the territory, we want plaques and all kinds of awards and stuff too, but at the same time, it's more important to inspire someone." The first track to leak off of the mixtape was "Play Too Rough", and months later came out with the music video of the song, "Woke Up Like This".

== Track listing ==
Credits adapted from album packaging.

No.	Title	Producer(s)	Length
1.	"Creator /Intro" (featuring JS)	Dot N Pro	4:14
2.	"Don't Get In My Way" (featuring Royce Da 5'9" and Shanica Knowles)	Dot N Pro	5:34
3.	"Woke Up Like This"	Hunter Bressan	4:51
4.	"Trap House"	Dot N Pro	3:04
5.	"Only Nigga Left"	Dot N Pro	4:33
6.	"Everybody Ain't Kings" (featuring Kobe and Devin Cruise)	Peter Pan	6:43
7.	"But You Playin'" (featuring Mario and Lola Monroe)	Los; Devin Cruise	1:38
8.	"Fuck the Club" (featuring Lil Al B)	Los; Polo Bandit; Peter Pan	4:01
9.	"I Don't Give a Fuck"	Peter Pan	3:59
10.	"All On Me"	Hunter Bressan; Peter Pan	4:33
11.	"Hard Time" (featuring Kobe, Mark Battles, and Shanica Knowles)	Devin Cruise	5:13
12.	"Play Too Rough"	J. Oliver	4:16
13.	"OG Bobby Johnson Freestyle"		3:27
14.	"Control Freestyle"		3:42
15.	"Me Too" (featuring Kid Ink and Jeremih)	Devin Cruise	3:50
16.	"Fake Niggas Died"	Hitmaka	2:51
17.	"Poundcake Freestyle"		4:27
18.	"Do Somethin'" (featuring Devin Cruise and Que)	Eric Merkison; Los	3:27
19.	"Bar Mitzvah"		4:08
