= Nothing Really Matters (Mr. Probz song) =

Single by Mr. Probz
- Released: 29 September 2014
- Genre: R&B; power ballad; adult contemporary
- Length: 3:42
- Label: Left Lane; Sony; Ultra
- Songwriters: Dennis Princewell Stehr; Giorgio Tuinfort; Aliaune Thiam; Jake Gosling
- Producers: Giorgio Tuinfort; Mr. Probz

Mr. Probz singles chronology
"Twisted" (2014)	"Nothing Really Matters" (2014)	"Little Secrets" (2014)

Music videos
- "Nothing Really Matters" on YouTube; "Nothing Really Matters" (Afrojack remix) on YouTube

"Nothing Really Matters" is a song by Dutch singer Mr. Probz. It was released on 29 September 2014 as a digital download. The song was written by Dennis Princewell Stehr, Aliaune Thiam, Giorgio Tuinfort and Jake Gosling. It peaked to number one on the Dutch Singles Chart and in Portugal. The song has also charted in Belgium and Sweden.

== Music video ==
A music video to accompany the release of "Nothing Really Matters" was first released onto YouTube on 21 November 2014 at a total length of three minutes and forty-nine seconds. The Afrojack remix video was released on June 2, 2015.

== Track listing ==
Digital download
No.	Title	Length
1.	"Nothing Really Matters"	3:42

Digital download — remixes
No.	Title	Length
1.	"Nothing Really Matters" (Afrojack remix radio edit)	3:19

CD single
No.	Title	Length
1.	"Nothing Really Matters" (Afrojack remix radio edit)	3:19
2.	"Nothing Really Matters"	3:39

== Charts ==
=== Weekly charts ===
Chart (2014–15)	Peak position
Belgium (Ultratop 50 Flanders)	3
Belgium (Ultratop 50 Wallonia)	46
Denmark (Tracklisten)	37
Germany (GfK)	82
Hungary (Stream Top 40)	9
Ireland (IRMA)	45
Netherlands (Dutch Top 40)	1
Netherlands (Single Top 100)	1
Norway (VG-lista)	28
Sweden (Sverigetopplistan)	15
UK Singles (Official Charts)	72
US Hot Dance/Electronic Songs (Billboard)	17

=== Year-end charts ===
Chart (2014)	Position
Netherlands (Dutch Top 40)	41
Netherlands (Single Top 100)	11

Chart (2015)	Position
Netherlands (Dutch Top 40)	41
Netherlands (Single Top 100)	34
Sweden (Sverigetopplistan)	93
US Hot Dance/Electronic Songs (Billboard)	88

=== Decade-end charts ===
Chart (2010s)	Position
Netherlands (Single Top 100)	29

=== All-time charts ===
All-time chart rankings for "Nothing Really Matters"
Chart	Rank
Dutch Love Songs (Dutch Top 40)	18

== Release history ==
Region	Date	Format	Label
Netherlands	29 September 2014	Digital download	Left Lane; Sony; Ultra

== Certifications ==
Region	Certification	Certified units/sales
Belgium (BRMA)	Gold	15,000^{*}
Denmark (IFPI Danmark)	Gold	45,000^{‡}
Netherlands (NVPI)	4× Platinum	120,000^{‡}
Sweden (GLF)	2× Platinum	80,000^{‡}
^{*} Sales figures based on certification alone.^{‡} Sales+streaming figures based on certification alone.
