= Redlight Boogie =

Dutch rapper (born 1973)

- Also known as: SugaCane; Cane; Hurricane; Busy Beat
- Born: Eugene Voorn; October 1, 1973 (age 53); Amsterdam, Netherlands
- Genre: Hip hop
- Occupation: Rapper
- Instrument: Vocals
- Years active: 1985–present
- Labels: TopNotch; Now or Neva

Eugene Voorn (born October 1, 1973), known professionally as Redlight Boogie or SugaCane, is a Dutch rapper. He is considered one of the pioneers of hip hop music in the Netherlands.

== Career ==
Voorn was born in the neighborhood De Pijp in Amsterdam to a Surinamese father and a Dutch mother. In 1982, at the age of nine, he started to take an interest in rapping, breakdancing and beatboxing, three elements of the hip hop culture originating from the United States. He started rapping under the name Busy Beat. Hip hop music in the Netherlands was at that time just known among some enthusiasts in the larger cities, and not by the general public. In 1987, Voorn released the song "Grows in Effect" as Busy Beat, which was produced by LTH. Between 1988 and 1992, he was a member of the group 2 Tuff.

In the early 1990s, he changed his stage name to "Hurricane", but after he learned that the name was already used by DJ Hurricane, he became known as SugaCane. He got the nickname "Cane" in the period that he was dealing cocaine in Amsterdam. He also worked as a pimp for several years. Cane participated in rap battles, contributed to mixtapes of radio program Villa 65 and performed on stages with several international rappers in Amsterdam. Cane became known for his social critical lyrics and his aggressive style and appearance, which ensured that he built up a solid reputation in Amsterdam and other places in the Netherlands. In 1993, Chuck D of Public Enemy advised Dutch rappers to rap in the Dutch language instead of English, because they would have more musical growth opportunities and they could logically express themselves better in their own native language. Dutch rappers like Extince and Brainpower followed this advice and became relatively successful in Dutch. Because of his international aspirations, Cane continued to rap in English to reach a larger public outside the Netherlands and Belgium.

In 1996, Cane had a modest hit in the Dutch rap circuit with his single "Let 'em know", and the accompanying music video was broadcast on television channel TMF. The single was released by the record label Supreme Slice Records (later known as TopNotch). Cane has performed on various stages in both the Netherlands and Germany, and performed as a supporting act for Snoop Dogg, Naughty by Nature, Busta Rhymes, Wu-Tang Clan and Redman. In 1997, he released a mixtape named Killertape Vol. 1. The mixtape included a freestyle with Ol' Dirty Bastard in the studio of Villa 65. In 2000, Cane founded his own record label Now or Neva Records and released his single "You can't fool mine", which was a diss track aimed to rapper E-Life. The single reached the top of the hip hop charts of the Dutch music channel The Box.

In 2006, he formed the English-language hip hop collective The Most Official with Dutch rappers Mr. Probz, U-Niq, Rowdy, MD and Sonny Diablo. The group released the mixtape The Most Official Mixtape, which included the track "Next Block". During interviews, members of The Most Official criticized the majority of the Dutch rappers at the time, who would present a light-hearted version of hip-hop to the general public with their hit repertoires in the Dutch Top 40. Cane also starred in the movie Bolletjes Blues.

In 2009, he changed his stage name to Redlight Boogie and released his studio album Dirty Money, Clean Hands. In January 2010, he collaborated with Sean Price and released the tracks "Heat Rock" and "Welcome Me In" featuring Heltah Skeltah. In February 2010, Redlight Boogie also released a mixtape called Lost 'n Found.

On September 16, 2019, he released the song "Oh Oh" featuring the singer Nivea.

== Discography ==
Albums

- Killertape Vol.1 (1997)
- The Most Official Mixtape (with The Most Official) (2006)
- Dirty Money, Clean Hands (2009)
- Lost 'n Found (2010)
