= Waves (Mr. Probz song) =

2013 single by Mr. Probz

Single by Mr. Probz

from the EP Against the Stream
- Released: 26 April 2013
- Recorded: 2013
- Studio: Han Nuijten @ venue BulletSoundStudios
- Genre: Soft rock; pop
- Length: 2:54
- Label: Left Lane
- Songwriter: Dennis Princewell Stehr
- Producers: Mr. Probz; Mihai Puscoiu

Mr. Probz singles chronology
"Gold Days" (2013)	"Waves" (2013)	"Waves" (Robin Schulz remix) (2014)

Music video
- "Waves" on YouTube

"Waves" is a song by Dutch singer and rapper Mr. Probz. Originally released through Left Lane Productions on 26 April 2013, the song became an international hit upon being remixed in a more up-tempo fashion by German DJ and record producer Robin Schulz, with Schulz's remix topping the charts in multiple countries, including Austria, Sweden, and the United Kingdom. "Waves" was sent to US dance radio by Ultra Music on 14 April 2014. The remix was the fourth best-selling song of 2014 in the UK, selling over 800,000 copies.

== Background ==
Mr Probz told USA Today about writing the song: "It was like someone put a hard drive in the back of my head and boom! The song was there. Everyone knows this type of situation, where the distance between you and a certain person is growing, every time you fight or whatever." The original version of the song debuted in the Dutch Top 40 and also became a hit in Australia, Belgium, New Zealand and South Africa.

== Robin Schulz remix ==
"Waves" (Robin Schulz remix)

Single by Mr. Probz

from the album Prayer
- Released: 4 February 2014
- Recorded: 28 April 2013
- Genre: Tropical house
- Length: 3:28
- Label: Left Lane; Ultra; Epic
- Songwriter: Dennis Princewell Stehr
- Producers: Mr. Probz; Robin Schulz (remix)

Mr. Probz singles chronology
"Waves" (2013)	"Waves" (Robin Schulz remix) (2014)	"Twisted" (2014)

Robin Schulz singles chronology
"Same" (2013)	"Waves" (Robin Schulz remix) (2014)	"Prayer in C" (2014)

Music video
- "Waves" (Robin Schulz remix) on YouTube

"Waves" (Robin Schulz remix)

Single by Mr. Probz featuring Chris Brown and T.I.

from the album Ultra Dance 16
- Released: November 11, 2014
- Length: 3:05
- Songwriter: Dennis Princewell Stehr
- Producers: Mr Probz; Robin Schulz (remix)

Chris Brown singles chronology
"Post to Be" (2014)	"Waves" (Robin Schulz remix) (2014)	"Ayo" (2015)

T.I. singles chronology
"Ejeajo" (2014)	"Waves" (Robin Schulz remix) (2014)	"Private Show" (2015)

Audio video
- "Waves" (Robin Schulz remix) feat. Chris Brown and T.I. on YouTube

In 2014, "Waves" was remixed in a more up-tempo fashion by German DJ and record producer Robin Schulz. "At the time there were a lot of remixes and bootlegs everywhere after the original hit the ceiling in Holland. But when my manager told me about Robin Schulz’s version, I gave it a listen and right away we already knew that if we would want to make a move like that, it should be that version," Mr. Probz told Billboard. "After numerous labels outside of Holland started hitting us up to see if we would be interested in releasing it officially it was all a no brainer from there. We contacted Robin's people after that and the rest is history."

Schulz's remix was released as a single on 4 February 2014 in North America and 7 February in Europe. The remix propelled the song to greater success, topping the charts in Austria, Germany, Norway, Sweden, Switzerland and the United Kingdom, and peaking within the top five of the charts in Denmark, Finland, Hungary, Ireland and Italy. The remix is strongly inspired by the track "Mr Probz - Waves (Roter & Lewis Edit)", released in mid-2013.

An alternate version of the Schulz remix was released on November 11, 2014, featuring additional vocals from American rapper T.I. and American singer Chris Brown. This version is featured on the Ultra Music compilation album Ultra Dance 16.

=== Chart performance ===
On 27 April 2014, "Waves" debuted at number one on the UK Singles Chart, selling 127,000 copies in its first week, and then remained there the following week. The song also peaked at number one in Austria, Germany, Norway, Sweden and Switzerland. In the United States, the remix reached number one on the Billboard Dance/Mix Show Airplay chart for the issue dated 16 August 2014. "Waves" also topped the UK's Official Audio Streaming Chart for eight consecutive weeks and ended 2014 as both the UK's fourth most streamed track and fourth best-seller, with 32.1 million streams and selling 815,000 copies.

=== Music video ===
The music video for the remix of "Waves" was directed by Petro Papahadjopoulos. It was filmed in Tulum, Mexico and released on 3 February 2014; another identical version was uploaded by Ultra Music the following day. Belarusian model Maryna Linchuk and British model James Penfold star in the video as a couple, with Mr. Probz in a cameo in a bar.

The video begins with Penfold swimming towards a desert island. After reaching the shore and knocking some coconuts down from a tree, he recounts a time when he and his girlfriend were on holiday together. They are shown to get on very well at first, but then have several arguments, and this culminates in them breaking up one evening. The scene switches to Penfold sitting in a Jacuzzi and drinking several shots of vodka, revealing that the desert island never existed and was only in his mind. He then collapses back-first into the Jacuzzi and drowns. The video ends with Penfold lying dead in the middle of the ocean. The video has over 600 million views as of November 2024.

== Track listings ==
Digital download

1. "Waves" – 2:54

Digital download (remix)

1. "Waves" (Robin Schulz radio edit) – 3:28

Digital download (remix)

1. "Waves" (Robin Schulz radio edit) [featuring Chris Brown and T.I.] – 3:10

CD single

1. "Waves" (Robin Schulz radio edit) – 3:28
2. "Waves" (original edit) – 2:54

== Charts ==
=== Original version ===
==== Weekly charts ====
Weekly chart performance for "Waves"
Chart (2013–2014)	Peak position
Australia (ARIA)	3
Belgium (Ultratop 50 Flanders)	1
Belgium (Ultratop 50 Wallonia)	2
Netherlands (Dutch Top 40)	6
Netherlands (Single Top 100)	5
New Zealand (Recorded Music NZ)	3
South Africa Airplay (EMA)	5

==== Year-end charts ====
2013 year-end chart performance for "Waves"
Chart (2013)	Position
Netherlands (Dutch Top 40)	3
Netherlands (Single Top 100)	8

2014 year-end chart performance for "Waves"
Chart (2014)	Position
Australia (ARIA)	21
Belgium (Ultratop Flanders)	4
Belgium (Ultratop Wallonia)	14
Netherlands (Single Top 100)	12
New Zealand (Recorded Music NZ)	21

2015 year-end chart performance for "Waves"
Chart (2015)	Position
Netherlands (Single Top 100)	85

=== Robin Schulz remix ===
==== Weekly charts ====
Weekly chart performance for Robin Schulz remix
Chart (2014–2015)	Peak position
Austria (Ö3 Austria Top 40)	1
Belgium (Ultratop Flanders Dance)	1
Belgium (Ultratop Wallonia Dance)	2
Brazil (Billboard Brasil Hot 100)	60
Canada Hot 100 (Billboard)	10
Canada CHR/Top 40 (Billboard)	12
Canada Hot AC (Billboard)	38
CIS Airplay (TopHit)	6
Czech Republic Airplay (ČNS IFPI)	1
Czech Republic Singles Digital (ČNS IFPI)	4
Denmark (Tracklisten)	3
Euro Digital Song Sales (Billboard)	1
Finland (Suomen virallinen lista)	3
France (SNEP)	3
Germany (GfK)	1
Greece Digital Songs (Billboard)	1
Hungary (Dance Top 40)	3
Hungary (Rádiós Top 40)	1
Hungary (Single Top 40)	1
Ireland (IRMA)	3
Israel International Airplay (Media Forest)	6
Italy (FIMI)	2
Lebanon (The Official Lebanese Top 20)	5
Luxembourg Digital Song Sales (Billboard)	2
Norway (VG-lista)	1
Poland Airplay (ZPAV)	1
Poland Dance (ZPAV)	8
Portugal Digital Song Sales (Billboard)	1
Romania (Airplay 100)	7
Russia Airplay (TopHit)	5
Scottish Singles Sales (Official Charts)	1
Slovakia Airplay (ČNS IFPI)	1
Slovakia Singles Digital (ČNS IFPI)	4
Slovenia (SloTop50)	1
Spain (Promusicae)	2
Sweden (Sverigetopplistan)	1
Switzerland (Schweizer Hitparade)	1
UK Singles (Official Charts)	1
UK Dance (Official Charts)	1
Ukraine Airplay (TopHit)	3
US Billboard Hot 100	14
US Hot Dance/Electronic Songs (Billboard)	1
US Adult Contemporary (Billboard)	25
US Adult Pop Airplay (Billboard)	11
US Dance Club Songs (Billboard)	38
US Latin Pop Airplay (Billboard)	40
US Pop Airplay (Billboard)	5
US Rhythmic Airplay (Billboard)	8

2025 weekly chart performance for Robin Schulz remix
Chart (2025)	Peak position
Greece International (IFPI)	100

==== Year-end charts ====
2014 year-end chart performance for Robin Schulz remix
Chart (2014)	Position
Austria (Ö3 Austria Top 40)	7
Canada (Canadian Hot 100)	64
CIS (Tophit)	22
Denmark (Tracklisten)	4
France (SNEP)	9
Germany (Official German Charts)	3
Hungary (Dance Top 40)	11
Hungary (Rádiós Top 40)	3
Hungary (Single Top 40)	4
Italy (FIMI)	10
Ireland (IRMA)	13
Poland (ZPAV)	9
Russia Airplay (TopHit)	10
Slovenia (SloTop50)	5
Spain (PROMUSICAE)	15
Sweden (Sverigetopplistan)	3
Switzerland (Schweizer Hitparade)	5
Ukraine Airplay (Tophit)	34
UK Singles (Official Charts Company)	4
US Hot Dance/Electronic Songs (Billboard)	12

2015 year-end chart performance for Robin Schulz remix
Chart (2015)	Position
Canada (Canadian Hot 100)	59
France (SNEP)	144
Hungary (Dance Top 40)	64
Russia Airplay (TopHit)	22
US Billboard Hot 100	95
US Adult Top 40 (Billboard)	48
US Hot Dance/Electronic Songs (Billboard)	5
US Mainstream Top 40 (Billboard)	47

=== Decade-end charts ===
2010s-end chart performance for original version
Chart (2010–2019)	Position
Netherlands (Single Top 100)	4

2010s-end chart performance for Robin Schulz remix
Chart (2010–2019)	Position
Germany (Official German Charts)	39
UK Singles (Official Charts Company)	41
US Hot Dance/Electronic Songs (Billboard)	21

== Certifications ==
Certifications for "Waves"
Region	Certification	Certified units/sales
Australia (ARIA)	4× Platinum	280,000^{‡}
Austria (IFPI Austria)	Gold	15,000^{*}
Belgium (BRMA)	Platinum	30,000^{*}
Canada (Music Canada)	4× Platinum	320,000^{‡}
Denmark (IFPI Danmark)	Gold	15,000^{^}
France (SNEP)	Gold	75,000^{*}
Germany (BVMI)	4× Platinum	1,200,000^{‡}
Italy (FIMI)	4× Platinum	200,000^{‡}
Mexico (AMPROFON)	2× Platinum	120,000^{‡}
Netherlands (NVPI)	6× Platinum	120,000^{‡}
New Zealand (RMNZ)	6× Platinum	180,000^{‡}
Portugal (AFP)	Gold	10,000^{‡}
Spain (Promusicae)	2× Platinum	120,000^{‡}
Sweden (GLF)	5× Platinum	200,000^{‡}
Switzerland (IFPI Switzerland)	Platinum	30,000^{^}
United Kingdom (BPI)	5× Platinum	3,000,000^{‡}
United States (RIAA)	2× Platinum	2,000,000^{‡}
Streaming
Denmark (IFPI Danmark)	4× Platinum	10,400,000^{†}
Greece (IFPI Greece) Robin Schulz radio edit	Platinum	2,000,000^{†}
Spain (Promusicae)	Platinum	8,000,000^{†}
^{*} Sales figures based on certification alone.^{^} Shipments figures based on certification alone.^{‡} Sales+streaming figures based on certification alone.^{†} Streaming-only figures based on certification alone.

== Release history ==
Release dates for "Waves"
Region	Date	Format	Version	Label	Ref.
Netherlands	26 April 2013	Digital download	Original	Left Lane	
Germany	22 November 2013	Digital download	Original	Left Lane	
Belgium	22 November 2013	Digital download	Original	Left Lane	
Canada	4 February 2014	Digital download	Remix	Left Lane	
United States	4 February 2014	Digital download	Remix	Left Lane	
Belgium	7 February 2014	Digital download	Remix	Left Lane	
France	7 February 2014	Digital download	Remix	Left Lane	
Germany	7 February 2014	Digital download	Remix	Left Lane	
Netherlands	7 February 2014	Digital download	Remix	Left Lane	
United Kingdom	7 February 2014	Digital download	Remix	Left Lane	
Italy	7 February 2014	Contemporary hit radio	Remix	Left Lane	
Germany	14 February 2014	Compact disc	Original; remix	Epic	
United States	14 April 2014	Dance radio	Remix	Ultra	
United States	15 September 2014	Adult album alternative radio	Remix	Ultra; RCA	
United States	11 November 2014	Digital download	Remix (featuring Chris Brown and T.I.)	Left Lane	
