= Matt Dellinger =

American journalist & writer

- Born: Matt Dellinger; Indianapolis, Indiana, U.S.
- Education: DePauw University (BA, 1997)
- Occupations: Journalist, writer, editor, podcaster
- Employer: The New Yorker
- Writing career
- Years active: 1997–present
- Genre: Non-fiction
- Subjects: Transportation, infrastructure, urban planning, American history
- Notable work: Interstate 69: The Unfinished History of the Last Great American Highway
- Website: www.mattdellinger.com

Matt Dellinger is an American journalist and writer who has written for The New Yorker, The Atlantic, Oxford American, and Smithsonian. He has reported on transportation and planning for the public radio show The Takeaway, and for WNYC's TransportationNation.org. He lives in Brooklyn, New York.

== Biography ==
In 2010, he published his first book, Interstate 69: The Unfinished History of the Last Great American Highway, which the Wall Street Journal called "an American-civics reality show, featuring pitched battles among special interests, grass-roots activists, environmentalists, politicians and Beltway bandits."

Dellinger worked for 11 years at The New Yorker magazine, where he led digital efforts including the launch of their first editorial website, the production of their first podcasts, and the creation of their complete digital archive. Dellinger also was director of the Vogue Archive project, which launched in 2011. He oversaw similar archival projects for Esquire, Aviation Week, Maclean's, and Aperture magazine.

In 2016, Dellinger became a Creative and Performing Artist and Writer Fellow at the American Antiquarian Society for research on his second book, about the Brooklyn 14th Regiment, which fought in the Civil War.

Dellinger was born in Indianapolis, Indiana, attended Pike High School, and graduated from DePauw University in 1997. He worked for ten years on staff at The New Yorker as an illustrations editor, multimedia editor, and the producer and host of The New Yorker Out Loud, the magazine's first weekly podcast. He also coached The New Yorker’s softball team for eight seasons.
