= Cleopatra Broumand =

Iranian-born American fashion designer

- کلئوپاترا برومند
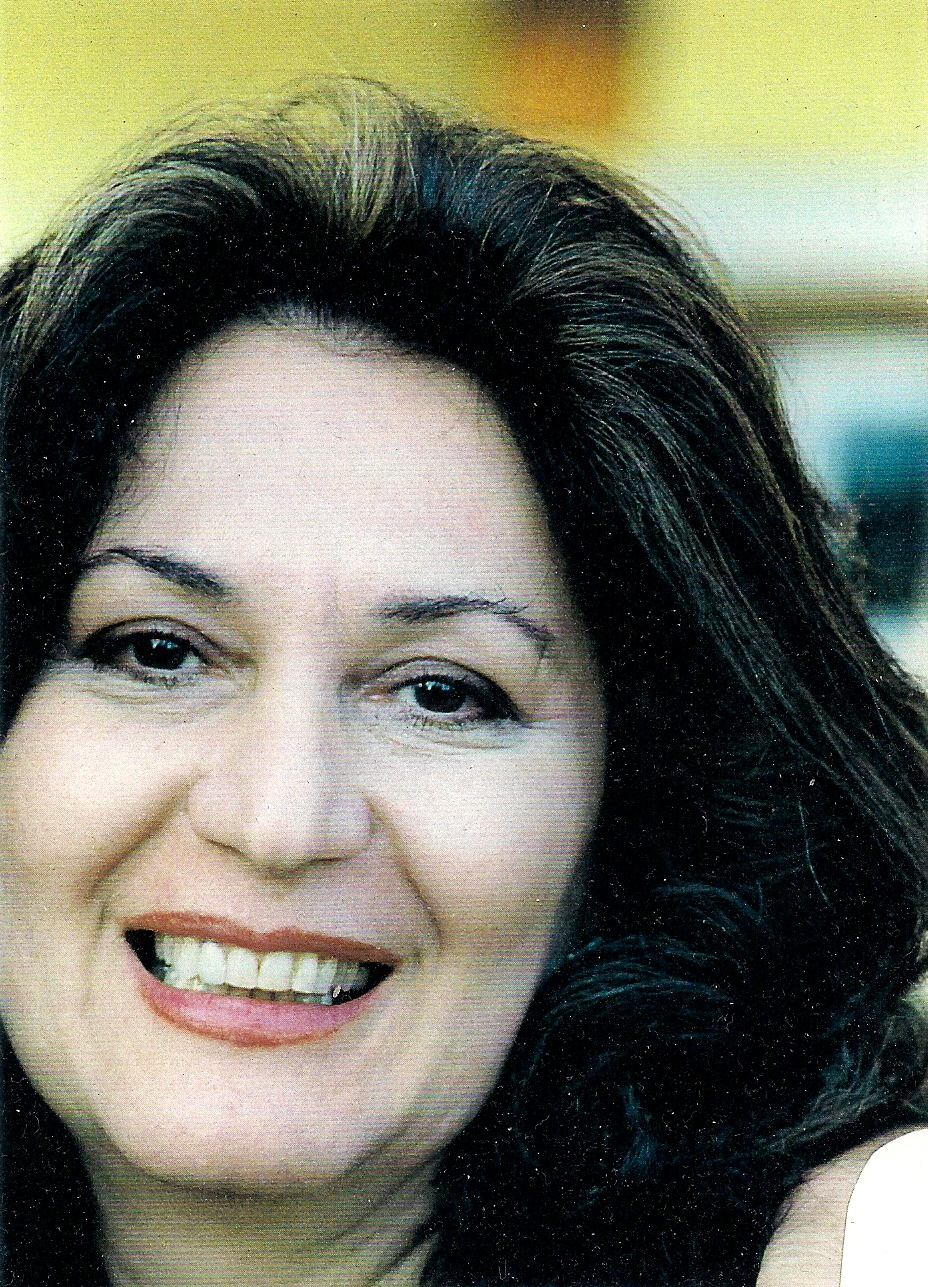
- Born: c. 1944 – c. 1945; Tehran, Imperial State of Iran (now Iran)
- Other names: Cleopatra Birrenbach, Cleopatra Broumand Birrenbach
- Education: Fashion Institute of Technology
- Occupations: Fashion designer, merchandiser, entrepreneur
- Years active: 1965–1996
- Known for: Fashion, recipes, coffee company
- Spouse: Thomas Birrenbach (m. 1972–present)

Cleopatra Broumand (Persian: کلئوپاترا برومند; born c. 1944 – c. 1945) is an Iranian-born American fashion designer, merchandiser, and entrepreneur in the apparel and food industries. Her businesses included Cleopatra Broumand Boutique, Inc., Cleopatra Coffee, and Cyrus International. She is also a chef and member of the International Association of Culinary Professionals. After marriage she also used the names Cleopatra Birrenbach, and Cleopatra Broumand–Birrenbach.

== Early life ==
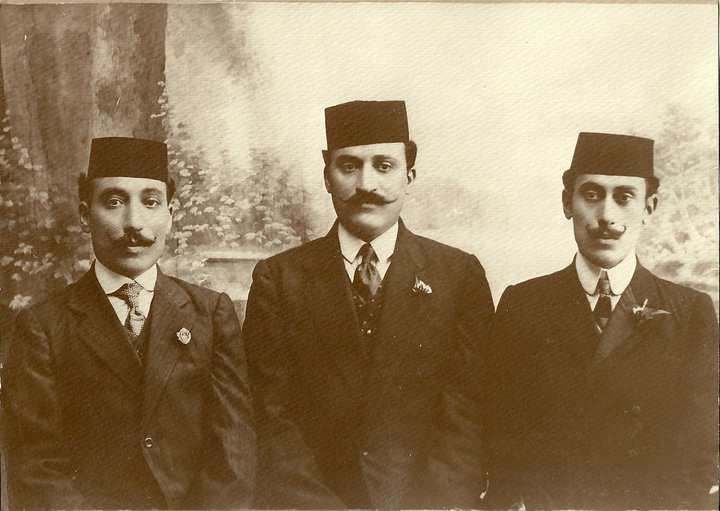
Cleopatra's father Mirza Khalil Broumand, and uncles in Baku, Azerbaijan

Born in Tehran, Imperial State of Iran, and she is the youngest of six children. Her father, Khalil Broumand, was and antique jewelry dealer, turned businessman in the oil industry in Russia. He returned to Iran after the Bolshevik revolution, and started a new life. Her mother Farangis, a graduate of American School in Iran, named her after watching Claudette Colbert play the Egyptian queen in a classic movie. At 8 years old, she announced to her mother her intentions of becoming a fashion designer. Insisting that she wanted to become the next Christian Dior, and young Broumand enrolled in design and sewing classes.

Her father, who had a penchant for things American, sent 15-year-old Cleopatra to live with her older brother who had earlier moved to Indianapolis, Indiana. Starting anew in Indianapolis, Broumand attended Pike High School and at age 17.

After her high school graduation, she moved to New York City to study design at the Fashion Institute of Technology (FIT). Before graduating from FIT, 21- year old Broumand established her first fashion business, Cleopatra Broumand Boutique, Inc., designing and manufacturing ready-to-wear women's fashion.

== Early career ==
Broumand's early apparel designs reflected her Persian origins. Her father's Persian Abba, a square shaped garment with armholes traditionally worn by men, was the inspiration for her initial collection. It was one of her most popular womenswear and menswear given its powerful, opulent look and freedom of movement. She used fabrics and textiles from Iran, India, and Morocco.

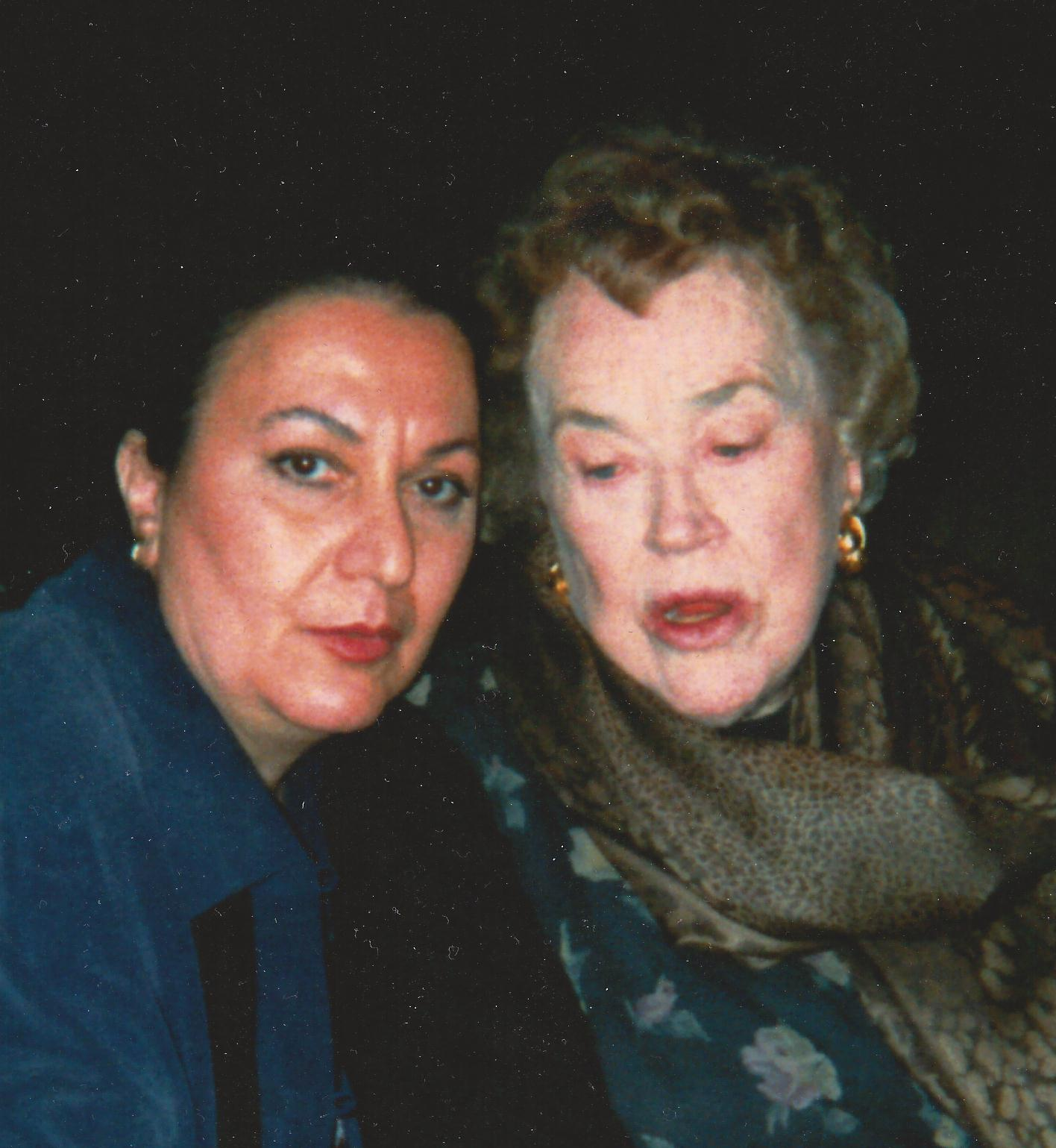
Cleopatra with Julia Child wearing a scarf by Cleopatra in 2000

Buyers were drawn to her marriage of Eastern and Western aesthetics, and her designs were sought out by the likes of Neiman Marcus, Saks Fifth Avenue, Henri Bendel, and Bergdorf Goodman, which was the first to display her designs in their windows four times in the same year.

=== Food and recipes ===
In her early career after graduation, she designed packaging for coffee for Neiman Marcus.

In the early 1970s, she launched Cleopatra Coffee, her own special blend packaged with a Persian coffee maker which sold at Neiman Marcus, Bloomingdale's and B. Altman and Company (she is credited with producing an early designer food product). In the late 1960s, Cleopatra's buyers and private customers were invited to a miniature museum of Persian artifacts, where she would read their fortune from their coffee grounds.

Having learned how to cook especially northern Persian delicacies from her mother, Broumand considers cooking an art form. In early 1974, she was featured in Craig Claiborne's book "Favorites from the New York Times", published by Times Books. Bareh-ye maveh (lamb with fruit), abgoosht limon (lemon stew), fesenjān (duck and meatballs in walnut and pomegranate sauce), and chelo (plain rice with saffron) were among the featured dishes she prepared. In 2000, she became a member of the International Association of Culinary Professionals by invitation of its co-founder, Julia Child.

== International work ==
In 1972, Cleopatra married Thomas Birrenbach, a steel company executive with the German Thyssen Group. He is the son of Kurt Birrenbach, chairman of the supervisory board of the Thyssen Group (today ThyssenKrupp) and Member of the German Bundestag (Parliament). Starting in 1974, Broumand spent the next ten years living and working around the world, in China, Germany, India, Italy, Iran, Japan, Russia, and Scotland. Aided by her knowledge of six languages, Broumand became a global fashion influence.

While residing in Germany, she launched Cyrus International, a Swiss-based consulting company advising American and European firms on marketing and operations in Iran.

At the request of the Thyssen Group of companies, Broumand accompanied her husband to Tehran to further develop the ongoing construction of Iranian oil and gas refineries and the acquisition of other major capital goods projects. Time spent in Iran covered the period before, during and after the Iranian Revolution. In 1977, at the request of her mentor Shirley Goodman, executive vice president of FIT, and under the auspices of Shahbanu Farah Pahlavi of Iran, Cleopatra directed the establishment of a FIT-subsidiary in Tehran. Because of the ensuing revolutionary turmoil this historic development did not come to fruition.

At their Tehran residence in October 1977, the Birrenbachs introduced U.S. Vice President Nelson Rockefeller and Happy Rockefeller, who were on a visit for the opening of the Museum of Contemporary Art in Tehran, for artist Marcos Grigorian. This introduction led to the acquisition of several of his artworks. Mr. Rockefeller eventually donated one of Grigorian's "Earthworks" to the Museum of Modern Art in New York City.

In 1979, the Chinese government invited her to high-level talks in Beijing as an advisor to the National China Textile Corporation on state-of-the-art technology and marketing know-how available in the United States.

On December 10, 1987, General Secretary Mikhail Gorbachev hosted a dinner in honor of President and Mrs. Ronald Reagan at the Soviet Embassy in Washington D.C.. On this occasion, Cleopatra was introduced to Foreign Minister Eduard Shevardnadze who, in the spirit of Glasnost (Openness) and Perestroika (Restructuring), took a vivid interest in her line of work and invited her and her husband to a series of fact finding visits to Moscow, Leningrad, Tbilisi, Tashkent, etc.. Based on her experience in China the purpose was to assess the needs of the antiquated textile and garment factories and to introduce western merchandising and marketing strategies to the Russian Ministry of Light Industries and Textiles. Following numerous countrywide visits, she presented proposals for their modernization. In the late 1980s, as advisor to the project "Russia in the World of Fashion," she conducted negotiations with the Ministry of Culture, the Director of the Hermitage Museum in St. Petersburg, and the vice-chairman of the Cultural Foundation of Russia, helping Russia to become a contender in international fashion.

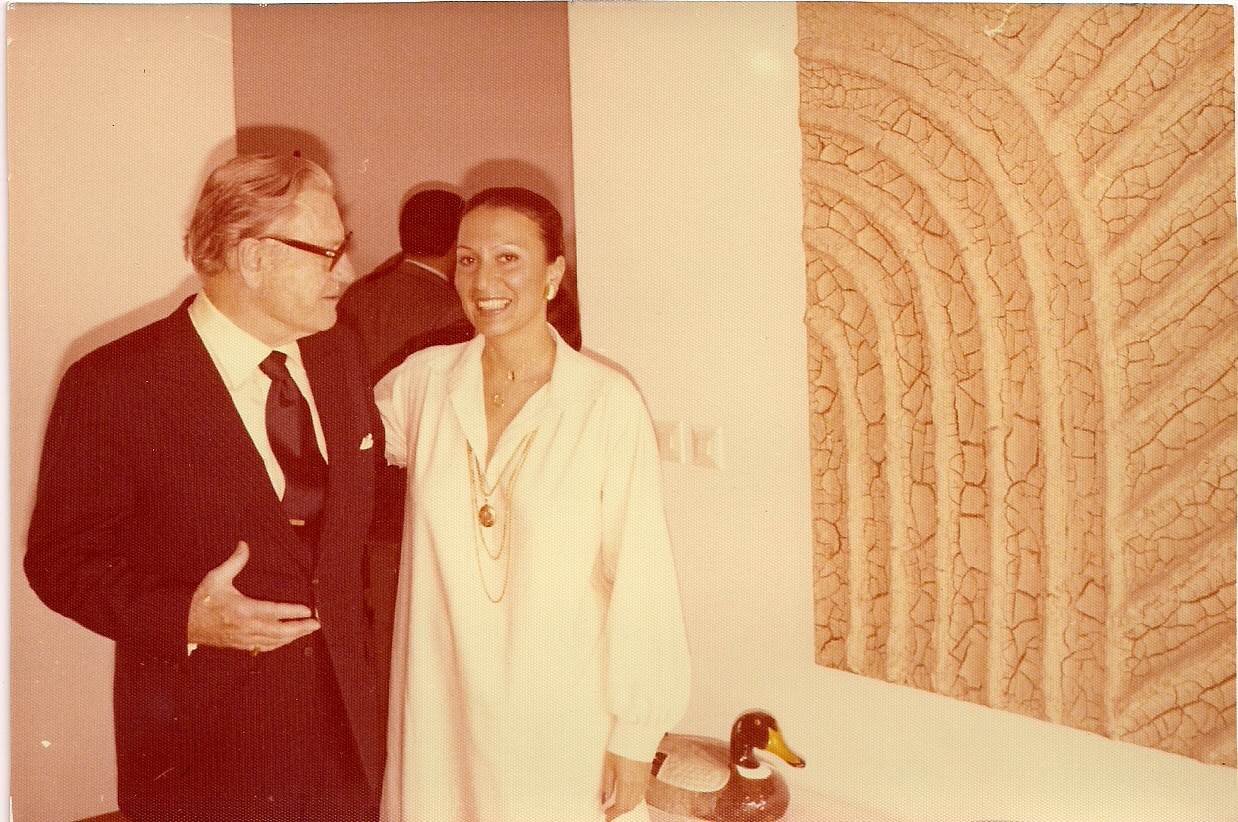
Cleopatra and Vice President Nelson Rockefeller in her home in Tehran, Iran

In 1989, as Artistic Liaison together with Tair Salakhov, contemporary artist and First Secretary of the USSR Artists' Union, she initiated and coordinated the first art exchange between the USSR and the Santa Fe Chamber Music Festival an art exhibition related to the legacy of renown Russian composer and artist Dmitri Shostakovich (1906–1975).

In 1987 Scottish knitting manufacturer Peter Scott praised her for "having advanced their industry a decade in technology."

In her travels, she not only influenced global manufacturing based on Western practices, but returned with Eastern goods and inspirations. She spearheaded a collaboration between Empress Farah and Vice President Nelson Rockefeller on the reproduction of antique Persian jewelries and artifacts for the American market. The Iranian Revolution impeded such development.

With the Indian Government and non-governmental manufacturers, she developed and jointly produced lines of beadings, embroideries, and silks for the United States market.

== Re-emergence as fashion designer ==
In 1983, upon returning to the United States, Broumand re-emerged as a designers on New York's Seventh Avenue and launched her colorful collections of women's ready-to-wear, evening wear, menswear, and accessories in the designer and couture categories. As CEO of Cleopatra Broumand, Inc., her second fashion venture, she presided over a diversified operation with productions in Italy and the Far East, distributing to two hundred top specialty stores and boutiques throughout America, Europe, and Japan. Cleopatra's fall 1983 collection was based on an ancient "Sun Man" mask and "Lady Sun," as well as starbursts and crescent moons. All her silk prints were computer designed and produced in the Como region of Italy by producers such as: Etro, Corisia, Taroni, etc. Her cashmeres and alpaca were from Loro Piana and Agnona.

For her fall 1984 collection, she drew inspiration from contemporary artist Marcos Grigorian's "Earth Work" revealing its cracks. and from German Zero Group artist Adolf Luther's "Light and Matter" (Licht+Materie) coil motif. Her evening designs included quilted silk jackets, pleated skirts, and lightly embroidered silk shirts. In this same season, with the cracked earth and coil motives, she premiered a collection of men's sweaters after actor Paul Newman inquired about menswear while attending an earlier womenswear trunk show and personal appearance in Beverly Hills.

Her fall 1985 collection drew inspiration from the Houghton Shahnameh or Book of Kings, 16th century miniature illustrations of 10th century Persian writer Ferdowsi's poetry. A sweater from this collection was included in a time capsule placed at New York Marriott Marquis' grand opening ceremony on October 8, 1985. A computer design knitted face with red lips and an asymmetrical collar on the sweaters were among other popular designs in the collection. She was using computers to aid in her apparel design process in 1985. Her spring 1985 collection was titled Rajah, and was inspired by Indian royalty.

Reminiscent of her earlier designs, she made garments inspired by the medieval world. The sword, falcon, and metallic glint of armor appeared in her fall 1986 designs which retained their softness in their knitted and silk textures or delicate embroidery as the breastplate inspired pieces did.

The Palm Beach Daily News deemed "Cleopatra's woman a woman of tomorrow with yesterday's romance" and credited her ability to marry the modern with "the exotic".

Bergdorf Goodman, Neiman Marcus, Saks Fifth Avenue, Bloomingdale's, Barneys, Takashimaya, Henri Bendel, Nordstrom, Bullocks Wilshire, etc. are among the stores which carried her line. Celebrity clients included the likes of Jacqueline Kennedy Onassis, Gloria Swanson, Elizabeth Taylor, Joan Collins, Linda Evans, Whitney Houston, Jill St. John, Yue-Sai Kan, Elena Obraztsova, Shirley MacLaine, Oprah Winfrey, Marlon Brando, Paul Newman, Luciano Pavarotti, as well as prominent personalities from the world of business and politics.

== Humanitarian work ==
Following the Armenian earthquake of 1988, she became founder and director of the Children of Crisis Foundation in Washington, D.C., the first Russian/American foundation. In April 1989, per Broumand's suggestion, a three-day auction of one million dollars' worth of her clothing and scarves, inaugurated by Liana Dubinin, wife of the USSR Ambassador to Washington, opened at the Madison Hotel in Washington D.C. benefiting the Armenian Children Relief Fund.

In 1996, contribution from proceeds of a trunk sale in Park City, Utah went to the Huntsman Cancer Foundation.

== Awards ==
In 1989, she was honored with an Order of Merit award by the Supreme Soviet and Council of Ministers of the Armenian SSR in recognition for her charitable contribution. The ceremony took place at the Russian Embassy in Washington, D.C. President Ronald Reagan was among the recipients.

Member of the International Research Council, Near East Museum of Ancient and Contemporary Art, The Marcos and Sabrina Grigorian Collection (Yerevan, Armenia).

== Personal life ==
Broumand resides in New York City with her husband Thomas. She is developing new food items, among them a dough-less, gluten free pizza.
