= Bolletjes Blues =

- Theatrical release poster
- Directed by: Karin Junger
- Written by: Karin Junger; Brigit Hillenius
- Produced by: René Huybrechste; Joram Willink
- Starring: Negativ; Sophie van Oers; SugaCane; Mr. Probz
- Music by: Joram Willink, Giorgio Tuinfort
- Production company: Dutch Mountain Movies
- Distributed by: Buena Vista International
- Release date: 23 March 2006
- Running time: 92 minutes
- Language: Dutch

Bolletjes Blues (Gangsta Blues, also known as Bling!) is a 2006 Dutch musical film with Negativ as the main character, Spike.

== Plot ==
Spike is a young black man from Suriname who lives in the Bijlmermeer. He is a student first, but drops out. In order to have enough money to impress his white girlfriend Rosalie (Sophie van Oers) he joins a gang led by Delano (SugaCane) and commits various robberies.

A related gang operates a cocaine smuggling route from Suriname to the Netherlands with mules swallowing cocaine pellets. As a mule, Spike is arrested on departure from Johan Adolf Pengel International Airport (Zanderij) near Paramaribo, and incarcerated at Santo Boma prison.

Rosalie volunteers as mule also, in order to be able to visit Spike. The film ends after this visit, it does not show whether she actually swallows and smuggles cocaine pellets.

== Cast ==
- Negativ as Spike
- Sophie van Oers as Rosalie
- SugaCane as Delano
- Raymzter as Musu
- Mr. Probz as Jimmy
- Adigun Arnaud as Shed Block Thug
- Kimo as Fred
- Derenzo Sumter as Melvin
- Goldie as Zamira
- Salah Edin as Abid Tounssi
- MC Aldrin as Beatboxer
- Verginia Olijfveld as Tante Jennifer
- Reina Linger as Manuela
- Mike Reus as Meester Kees
- Glenn Durfort as Ome edje

== Reception ==
CineMagazine rated the film 2 stars.

VPRO Cinema rated the film 3 stars.
