= Kevin Sutton =

American college basketball coach (born 1964)

Current position
- Title: Assistant coach
- Team: Florida Gulf Coast
- Conference: Atlantic Sun

Biographical details
- Born: August 31, 1964 (age 62)

Playing career
- 1983–1986: James Madison

Coaching career (HC unless noted)
- 1986–1988: James Madison (asst.)
- 1988–1990: Flint Hill Prep (asst.)
- 1990–1992: Harker Prep
- 1992–1998: St. John's Prospect Hall (asst.)
- 1998–1999: Montrose Christian
- 1999–2001: Old Dominion (asst.)
- 2001–2003: Bishop McNamara HS
- 2004–2011: Montverde Academy
- 2011–2013: George Washington (asst.)
- 2013–2016: Georgetown (asst.)
- 2016–2018: Pittsburgh (asst.)
- 2018–2021: Rhode Island (asst.)
- 2021–present: Florida Gulf Coast (asst.)

Head coaching record
- Overall: 489–102 (.827) (high school)

Raymond Eugene "Kevin" Sutton (born August 31, 1964) is an American college basketball coach, currently an assistant coach at the University of Rhode Island. Sutton previously served as the head boys basketball coach at Bishop McNamara, Montrose Christian, Montverde Academy and was the head coach for Team USA in the 2011 Nike/USA Basketball Hoop Summit.

== Playing career ==
In 1988, Sutton graduated from James Madison University where he played three years of varsity basketball and lettered each season.

== High school coaching ==
Sutton coached at five nationally ranked high school programs—Flint Hill Prep (1988–1990), Harker Prep (1990–1992), St. John's Prospect Hall (1992–1998), Montrose Christian and Montverde Academy (2004–2011)—amassing a 489–102 record and winning two national championships. In 1998, he was the associate head coach on the USA Today Super 25 National Championship team and in 2007, he was the head coach of the Montverde Academy Hoops.Com National Championship team led by future NBA player Solomon Alabi.

While at Montverde Academy, Sutton's program was labeled a "basketball factory" by the Orlando Sentinel. Sutton coached seven nationally ranked teams and compiled a 186-33 record, while turning out 55 Division I scholarship athletes and three All-America selections. During his final two seasons at Montverde, Sutton was assisted by former NBA player Andrew DeClercq, Matthew Wheeler and hip-hop artist Dorian.

== College coaching ==
Sutton had a pair of two-year stints as an assistant coach at both James Madison University and Old Dominion University under Coach Jeff Capel. In 2011, Sutton was hired at George Washington University. In 2013, Sutton joined the staff at Georgetown University under coach John Thompson III. In 2016, he was hired by Kevin Stallings as an assistant coach at University of Pittsburgh.

== Team USA ==
Sutton has also been selected as a coach for USA Basketball on three occasions. He was an assistant coach at the Hoop Festival for the East team, had a two-year stint with the Junior Developmental Team (U16), which won a gold medal at the FIBA Americas Tournament in Argentina, and he was the head coach for the Nike/USA Basketball Hoop Summit, a game showcasing the top 10 international players against the top 10 American players. Led by Austin Rivers and Anthony Davis, Sutton's Team USA beat the World Team 92-80.

== Personal life ==
Sutton and his wife, Beth, have four children, Aaron, Kayleigh, Isaiah and Rileigh.

== Notable players coached ==
- Cory Alexander
- Solomon Alabi
- Bradley Beal
- James Bell
- Jason Capel
- Randolph Childress
- Patricio Garino
- Nate James
- George Lynch
- Luc Richard Mbah A Moute
- Haukur Palsson
- Ruslan Pateev
- L.D Williams
- Serge Zwikker
