= The Treatment (Mr. Probz album) =

Studio album by Mr. Probz
- Released: 16 September 2013
- Recorded: 2013
- Genre: Hip hop
- Label: Left Lane Recordings

Mr. Probz chronology
The Treatment (2013)	Against the Stream (2017)

Singles from The Treatment
- 1. "I'm Right Here" Released: 16 September 2013; 2. "Turning Tables" Released: 16 September 2013; 3. "Gold Days" Released: 16 September 2013

The Treatment is the debut studio album by Dutch rapper Mr. Probz. It was released in the Netherlands on 16 September 2013, through Traumashop and Republic. The album has peaked to number 12 on the Dutch Albums Chart. The album includes the singles "I'm Right Here", "Turning Tables" and "Gold Days".

== Track listing ==
Standard listing
No.	Title	Producer(s)	Length
1.	"Intro"	Mr. Probz	0:34
2.	"The Treatment"	Craze; Hoax	1:39
3.	"Drivin'"	Mr. Probz; T. Wes	3:16
4.	"Hard on Yourself"	City Lights	3:00
5.	"Interlude"	V. Don; Mr. Probz	1:10
6.	"I'm Right Here"	Craze; Hoax; Mr. Probz; M. Renjaan	3:37
7.	"Turning Tables" (featuring Kameron Corvet)	Soulsearchin'; M. Renjaan	2:52
8.	"Look at Us Now"	Mr. Probz	2:38
9.	"Don't Fuck With Me"	Soulsearchin'; J-Dicious; They Fit	3:28
10.	"Gold Days" (featuring Action Bronson)	Neenyo	3:33
11.	"Runnin'" (featuring Sonny Diablo)	Beat Butcha; M. Renjaan	3:35
12.	"Do It All Again"	Mr. Probz; R. De Kievit; M. Puscoiu	2:57
13.	"Hurdles" (featuring Kameron Corvet)	Neenyo	3:34

== Charts ==
Chart (2013–14)	Peak position
Belgian Albums (Ultratop Flanders)	179
Dutch Albums (Album Top 100)	12

== Release history ==
Region	Release date	Format	Label
Netherlands	16 September 2013	Digital download; CD	Left Lane Recordings
