= Dorian (rapper) =

American rapper

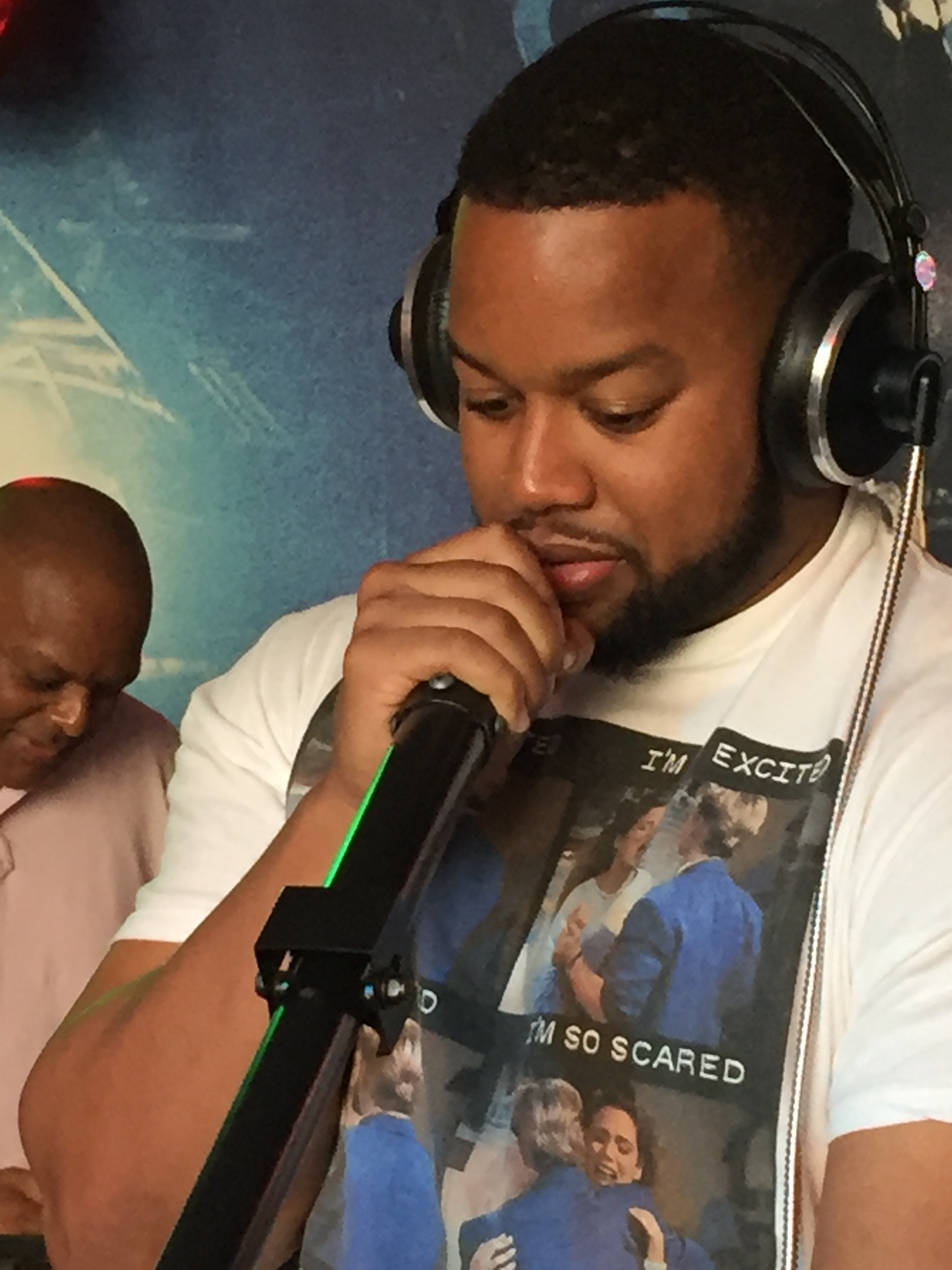
- Dorian in 2016
- Born: Alton Dorian Clark; August 2, 1984 (age 42); Abilene, Texas, U.S.
- Other names: Dorian, Duck
- Education: Indiana University Bloomington (B.A.); University of Central Florida (M.A.)
- Occupations: Rapper; songwriter; record producer
- Years active: 2009–present
- Children: 1
- Parents: Alton Kevin Clark (father); Deborah Lynne Clark (mother)
- Musical career
- Genres: Hip hop
- Instruments: Vocals; percussion
- Label: Group 82 LLC
- Website: group82university.com

Alton Dorian Clark (born August 2, 1984), known mononymously as Dorian, is an American rapper, producer, songwriter, and basketball coach from Indianapolis, Indiana.

== Early life ==
Alton Dorian Clark was born on August 2, 1984, on Dyess Air Force base in Abilene, Texas. His mother named him after actor Dorian Harewood who was from his parents' native town Dayton, Ohio. His father was an airman in the United States Air Force which caused Dorian to move 7 times before he was 10 years old. Dorian's parents grew up during the 1970s funk era and frequently played artists such as The Ohio Players, Lakeside and Bootsy Collins which would later influence Dorian musically. Dorian learned how to read music when he was 9 while playing the trumpet in the elementary school band. In 6th grade, Dorian's family moved to Indianapolis, Indiana where he played the drums in middle school and sang in his Baptist church choir from 8th grade until graduation from North Central High School.

== Career ==
=== Basketball career ===
After graduating from Indiana University Bloomington, Dorian made 800 cold phone calls and sent 1300 cold emails in hopes of landing a basketball coaching job. Dorian would get hired at Lees-McRae College in Banner Elk, North Carolina. In 2009, Dorian enrolled in graduate school at the University of Central Florida and coached high school basketball at Montverde Academy under Kevin Sutton. In the offseason, he trained University of Florida basketball player Patric Young. Dorian would also coach at Virginia Commonwealth University under Shaka Smart and Jacksonville University under Cliff Warren. In 2012, Dorian wrote for ESPN's TrueHoop Network covering the Orlando Magic.

=== Musical career ===
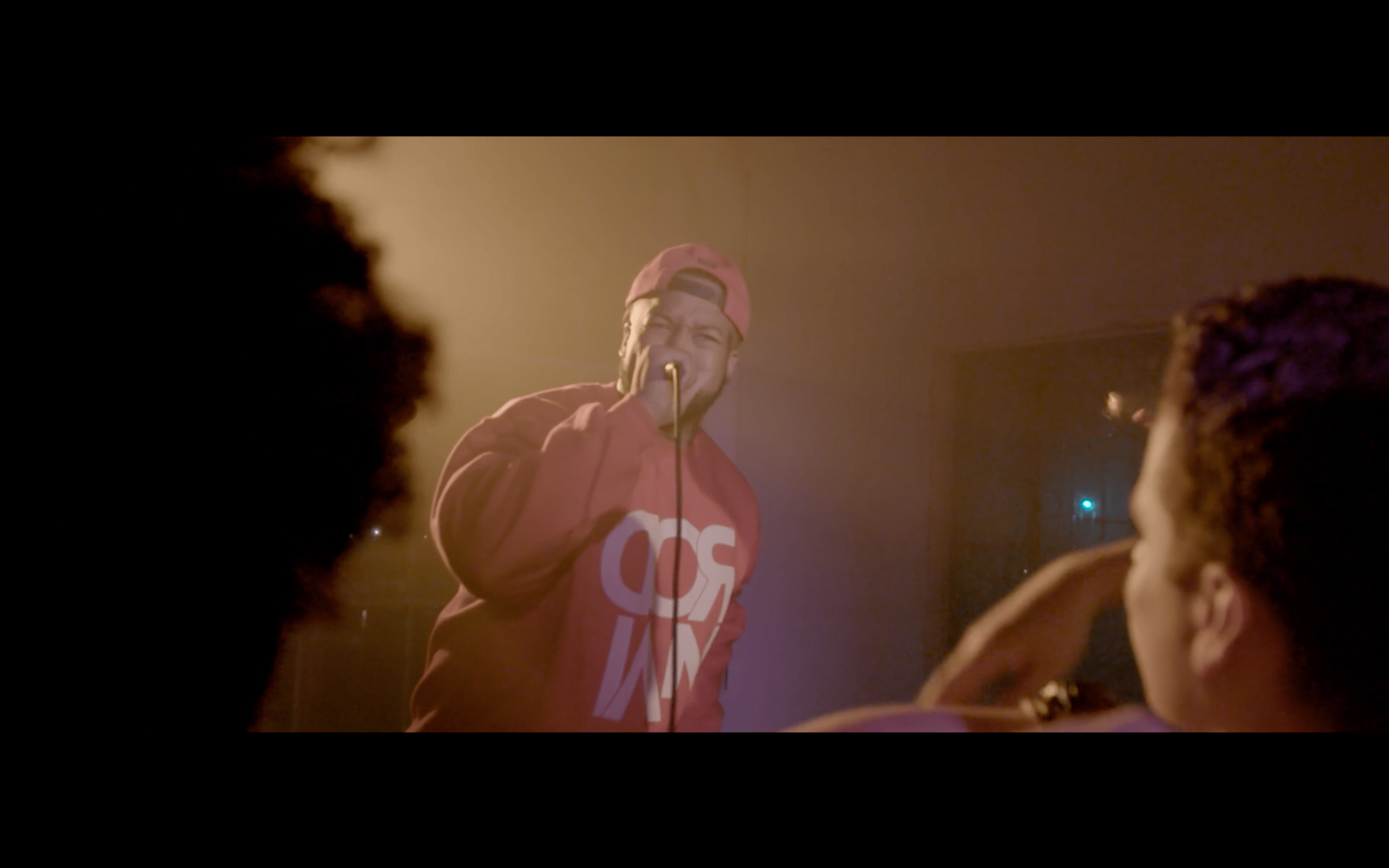
Dorian performing on Prodigy's The Commissary Kitchen Tour in Los Angeles, California

On Valentine's Day in 2014, Dorian bought Apple's music production software Logic Pro X. He taught himself how to make beats from YouTube tutorials. In 2015, Dorian signed a digital distribution deal. On Valentine's Day 2015, Dorian released his first project, The D.U.C.K. Tape. Dorian then moved back to Indianapolis and began to work on his second project with music producer Joey French. Dorian and Joey French met while attending Indiana University. In May 2015, Dorian released “Sunshine” as the lead single to his second album. On October 28, 2015, Dorian released his second full-length LP Every Scar Has A Story. Every Scar Has A Story was co-executive produced by Joey French and featured comedian Rob Sherrell. AllMusic editor Paul Simpson says, "his production style and storytelling skills have more in common with 80s and 90s hip-hop (with Warren G and Dr. Dre as a primary influence)…but his sound encompasses more contemporary influences such as trap and Kanye West”.

Upon moving to Los Angeles, California for his music career, Dorian released the single “Don’t Sleep” on YouTube. After the audio version received 60,000 views, Dorian released "Don’t Sleep" to music streaming services Spotify, Apple Music and Tidal in August 2016. Dorian collaborated with Def Jam signee and Indianapolis rapper Mark Battles for the "Don't Sleep" remix. The music video for "Don't Sleep" premiered on iHeartRadio's WZRL Real 98.3 Indianapolis. In 2017, So You Think You Can Dance Champion Kida The Great choreographed a routine to “Don’t Sleep” that went viral. Later that year, comedienne Jessica Vanessa used “Don’t Sleep” to score posts on Instagram. In April 2017, Dorian received FM radio play with his single "Even Love Me" debuting on WRIU 90.3 FM. Later that year, Dorian signed a music marketing deal with Journeys shoe store where his music video "Sunshine" was shown in all 1300 locations across North America.

=== Business career ===
In 2018, Dorian founded the music consulting firm, Group 82. In October 2018, Group 82 received national recognition from the United States Chamber of Commerce for their economic success.

== Influences ==
Dorian lists Kanye West's The College Dropout, JAY-Z’s The Blueprint, Eminem’s The Eminem Show, Nas’ Stillmatic and Yo Gotti’s Back 2 Da Basics as his favorite rap albums of all time.

== Personal life ==
On June 17, 2019, Dorian announced the birth of his daughter Nova via Instagram.

== Discography ==
=== Albums ===
Title	Album details
The D.U.C.K. Tape	Released: February 14, 2015; Label: Self-released; Formats: Digital Download
Every Scar Has A Story	Released: October 28, 2015; Label: Self-released; Formats: Digital Download
True Support	Released: September 11, 2020; Label: Self-released; Formats: Digital Download

=== Singles ===
Title	Year	Album
"Sunshine"	2015	Every Scar Has A Story
"Don't Sleep"	2016	True Support
"No No"	2016	True Support
"Don't Sleep (Remix)" (feat. Mark Battles)	2016	True Support
“Even Love Me”	2016	True Support
“#TooLit”	2017	True Support
“You Scared”	2017	True Support
"Michael Porter"	2017	True Support
"Rotate"	2018	True Support
"Dope"	2018	True Support
"Bout That"	2018	True Support
"Scroll"	2018	True Support
"She Like That"	2019	True Support

== Videography ==
Year	Title	Director
2017	"Don't Sleep"	Darius Turbak
2017	"Sunshine"	Darius Turbak
2018	"Michael Porter"	Dorian

== Concert tours ==
=== Supporting ===
- The Commissary Kitchen Tour (with Prodigy) (2016)
