= Pilot (song) =

Single by 50 Cent

from the album Animal Ambition
- Released: March 25, 2014
- Recorded: 2013
- Genre: East Coast hip-hop
- Length: 3:20
- Label: G-Unit; Caroline
- Songwriters: Curtis Jackson; Curtis Mayfield; S. Patten
- Producers: Shamtrax; Ky Miller (add.); Dot N Pro (add.)

50 Cent singles chronology
| "Hold On" (2014) | "Pilot" (2014) | "Smoke" (2014) |

"Pilot" is a song by American rapper 50 Cent, released on March 25, 2014, as the third single from his album Animal Ambition. It is the only single off the album to chart on the Bubbling Under Hot 100 Singles Chart.

== Track listing ==
Digital single

- "Pilot"

== Music video ==
On March 25, 2014, the music video for the song was released. The music video on YouTube has received over 15 million views as of April 2024.

== Chart performance ==
| Chart (2014) | Peak position |
|---|---|
| Germany (Deutsche Black Charts) | 20 |
| UK Hip Hop/R&B (Official Charts) | 20 |
| UK Singles (Official Charts) | 95 |
| US Bubbling Under Hot 100 (Billboard) | 19 |
| US Hot R&B/Hip-Hop Songs (Billboard) | 32 |
| US Hot Rap Songs (Billboard) | 20 |
