= Jessica Vanessa =

American dancer and internet personality

- Born: April 13, 1992 (age 34)
- Occupations: Dancer, Actress, Internet Celebrity

Jessica Vanessa DeLeon (born April 13, 1992) is an American internet personality and actress. DeLeon rose to prominence posting comedic videos to the social media application Vine and when Cosmopolitan Magazine wrote a feature naming her "The Woman Who Makes Six Figures Being A Professional Twerker".

== Career ==
Vanessa was a teaching assistant in Florida when she began to post videos of her dancing on Vine. Vanessa quickly amassed 1.9 million followers and began to receive payment from advertisers to promote products. Vanessa has stated, "What I make in six seconds would take me four months to make as a teaching assistant". Her brother helped her out by being her camera person. On Instagram, DeLeon began creating viral videos to popular hip-hop songs such as "Coco" by O.T. Genasis and "Don't Sleep" by Dorian. While most of the responses to her work online has been positive, she shared with Jezebel that she has had two major "breakdowns" over abusive online comments she's received.

In 2016, Vanessa transitioned her internet fame into acting as she landed roles in the Chris Stokes-directed projects Only For One Night and Til Death Do Us Part.

== Filmography ==
=== Film ===
- 2017 'Til Death Do Us Part
