= Hold On (50 Cent song) =

Single by 50 Cent

from the album Animal Ambition
- Released: March 18, 2014
- Recorded: 2013
- Genre: East Coast hip-hop
- Length: 3:46
- Label: G-Unit; Caroline
- Songwriters: Curtis Jackson; Joell Ortiz; Norman Whitfield; Barrett Strong; A. Feeney
- Producer: Frank Dukes

50 Cent singles chronology
| "Don't Worry 'Bout It" (2014) | "Hold On" (2014) | "Pilot" (2014) |

"Hold On" is a song by American rapper 50 Cent. It was released on March 18, 2014 as the second single from his fifth studio album Animal Ambition.

== Track listing ==
Digital single

- "Hold On"

== Controversy ==
The song disses James Rosemond, better known as Jimmy Henchman. 50 Cent and his G-Unit crew have been engaged in a deadly street beef for almost a decade with Jimmy Henchman. 50 Cent mentions the highly publicized beating of Jimmy Henchman's son, allegedly by the hands of G-Unit's Tony Yayo and other members of G-Unit. He also references a shooting that took place at Tony Yayo's house, where his home was sprayed with bullets by gunman paid off by Jimmy Henchman.

"On the phone I heard 'Ye smacked the shit outta a kid Now Jimmy got life, go smack him again. When it's war, it'll be war to the very end If they ever say we lose, I'll start it again That sneaky nigga, spray that Semi at your momma crib With a silencer we couldn't even hear that shit"

== Music video ==
On March 18, 2014, the music video was released for "Hold On". Eif Rivera directed the video.

The music video on YouTube has received over 10 million views as of April 2024.

== Chart performance ==
| Chart (2014) | Peak position |
|---|---|
| Germany (Deutsche Black Charts) | 40 |
| UK Singles (The Official Charts Company) | 199 |
| UK Hip Hop/R&B (Official Charts) | 38 |
| US Hot R&B/Hip-Hop Songs (Billboard) | 47 |
