= Joey French =

- Origin: Indianapolis, Indiana
- Genres: Hip-hop, R&B
- Occupations: record producer, engineer
- Instruments: Sampler, Logic Pro X, keyboard, drums
- Years active: 2000-present

Joseph French, known professionally as Joey French, is an American record producer and recording engineer from Indianapolis, Indiana. French gained recognition for producing on Warner Bros signee Waka Flocka Flame's debut album, Flockaveli.

== Life and career ==
In 2010, French produced the bonus track "Rumors" on Flockaveli by Waka Flocka Flame. In 2015, French was the executive producer of Every Scar Has A Story by Dorian.

== Personal life ==
French owns the production company JoHoSoPhat Productions located in Indianapolis, Indiana. French names hip-hop producer Timbaland as his primary influence.

== Production credits ==
- 2010: Waka Flocka Flame - "Rumors" from Flockaveli
- 2011: [ Ryan McDaniel] - "Naive"
- 2015: Dorian - "Sex God" feat. G. Martin from Every Scar Has A Story
- 2015: Dorian - Every Scar Has A Story (co-executive producer)
- 2016: [ Trajik ] "Country Time"
- 2017: [ The Combine/CBS Sports Making Of A Pro QB ] "Dime City"
- 2017: [ Mark Battles] "Penny" from Day 2
- 2018: [ Mark Battles] "Here We Go Again" from Vasi World
- 2018: [ Trajik ] "Traptown, USA"
- 2018: [ Mike Eazy BEazy ] "Complacent"
- 2018: [ Ceejay 2 Kold ] "Whole Lotta"
- 2018: [ Fox Network ] "Bad As It Gets" Star
- 2019: [ Fox Network ] "Jalen Ramsey Documentary" "All Good"
