= Pike High School =

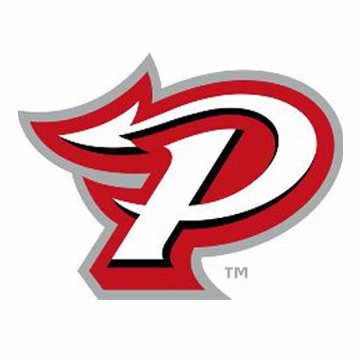

Location
- 5401 West 71st Street; Indianapolis, Indiana 46267; United States; 39°52′33″N 86°15′19″W

Information
- Type: Public High School
- Motto: Developing The Future...One Child at A Time
- Established: 1892
- School district: Metropolitan School District of Pike Township
- Principal: Jeremy Wolley
- Teaching staff: 201.35 (on an FTE basis)
- Grades: 9–12
- Enrollment: 3,193 (2023–2024)
- Student to teacher ratio: 15.86
- Color
- Athletics conference: Metropolitan Interscholastic Conference
- Nickname: Red Devils
- Yearbook: Pike's Peek
- Website: phs.pike.k12.in.us

Pike High School is a public high school on the northwest side of Indianapolis, Indiana.

== Athletics ==
Conference History

| Capital District | 1960–1970 |
| Central Suburban | 1971–1997 |
| Conference Indiana | 1998–2012 |
| MIC | 2013–present |

Varsity Sports

- Baseball (boys)
- Basketball (girls and boys)
- Cross country (girls and boys)
- Football (boys)
- Golf (girls and boys)
- Soccer (girls and boys)
- Softball (girls)
- Swimming and diving (girls and boys)
- Tennis (girls and boys)
- Track and field (girls and boys)
- Volleyball (girls)
- Wrestling (boys)

State Championships

- Boys Basketball (1998, 2001, 2003)
- Boys Tennis (1969)
- Girls Track and Field (1997, 2012, 2015)

== Notable alumni ==
- Mark Battles – rapper, producer and founder of record label Fly America
- LeVante Bellamy – professional football player
- Carl Broemel – rock musician and guitar player for the band "My Morning Jacket"
- Cleopatra Broumand – fashion designer
- Ryan Conwell – basketball player
- Matt Dellinger – journalist and writer
- Peter Dunn – financial author, radio host, television personality, and speaker
- Eric Holcomb – former Governor of Indiana
- R. J. Hunter – former shooting guard for the Maine Red Claws. Hunter formerly played for the Boston Celtics of the NBA
- Lynna Irby – Olympic Sprinter
- Michael Jerrell – NFL player for the Atlanta Falcons
- Stanford Keglar – former NFL player
- R. Scott Morris – American businessman
- Courtney Lee – former NBA shooting guard, Lee formerly played for the Orlando Magic, New Jersey Nets, Houston Rockets, Boston Celtics, Memphis Grizzlies, the Dallas Mavericks, Charlotte Hornets, and the New York Knicks.
- Lori Lindsey – former member of the United States women's national soccer.
- Ivan Rogers (actor) – film actor, director, producer and martial artist
- David Teague – former NBA D-League player for the Fort Wayne Mad Ants. Teague also previously played for several other professional basketball leagues outside of the United States
- Jeff Teague – former professional basketball player and NBA All-Star selection; current head coach of Pike High School Varsity Basketball Team.
- Marquis Teague – former NBA D-League point guard for the Oklahoma City Blue. Teague formerly played for the Brooklyn Nets of the NBA, as well as the Iowa Energy, Teague also won an NCAA championship in 2012 for the Kentucky Wildcats
- Chris Thomas – former professional basketball player
- Mike Walker – member, Canadian Football League Hall of Fame
- Tony Weeden – former basketball player
- Sasheer Zamata – comedian and cast member of Saturday Night Live

== See also ==
- List of schools in Indianapolis
- List of high schools in Indiana
