= Tony Weeden =

American basketball player

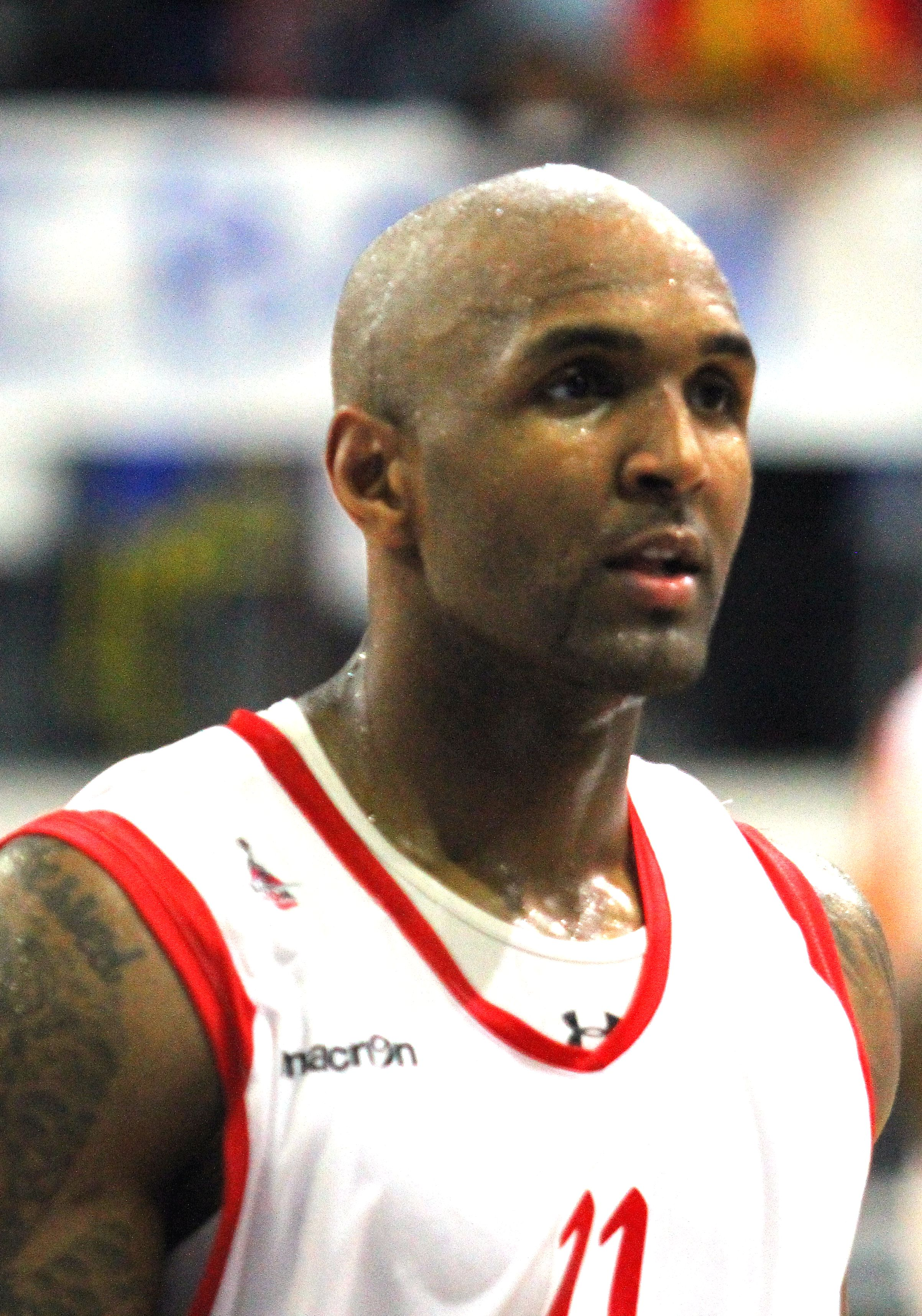

Mayrouba Club
- Position: Point guard / shooting guard
- League: Lebanese Basketball League

Personal information
- Born: July 25, 1982 (age 44) Chicago, Illinois
- Listed height: 6 ft 0 in (1.83 m)
- Listed weight: 205 lb (93 kg)

Career information
- High school: Manual (Indianapolis, Indiana); Pike (Indianapolis, Indiana)
- College: Wabash Valley (2001–2003); Chicago State (2003–2005)
- NBA draft: 2005: undrafted
- Playing career: 2005–present

Career history
- 2005: Macon Blaze
- 2005–2006: Kentucky Colonels
- 2006: Mississippi Hardhats
- 2006: Indiana Alley Cats
- 2006–2007: Quad City Riverhawks
- 2007–2008: Quebec City Kebekwa
- 2008: Al-Ittihad Aleppo
- 2008: Starogard Gdański
- 2008: Śląsk Wrocław
- 2008–2009: Basket Kwidzyn
- 2009–2010: Starogard Gdański
- 2010: Maroussi
- 2011–2012: Starogard Gdański
- 2012: Cimberio Varese
- 2012–2013: Anwil Włocławek
- 2013: Siarka Tarnobrzeg
- 2013–2014: Keravnos
- 2014: Lukoil Academic
- 2014–2015: Keravnos
- 2015–2016: Azad University Tehran
- 2017–present: Mayrouba Club

Career highlights
- 2x Polish League All-Star (2010, 2012)

Anthony L. Weeden Jr. (born July 25, 1982) is an American professional basketball player. He is a 184 cm (6 ft 0 in) guard. He played competitively at Emmerich Manual High School before transferring to Pike High School where they brought home the 2001 National Championship.

== Professional career ==
His career began in 2005 where he played in the United States and then Canada. He then transitioned to Syria, and in 2007 signed a contract with Polpharma Starogard Gdansk. Weeden began the 2008 season in Silesia, Wroclaw and after the withdrawal of the club with PLK, Weeden went on to play in Kwidzyn. In 2009, he returned to Polpharma where he led his team to the Polish Championships and took home the bronze medal. Weeden was selected for the 2010 Polish All Star Game and in the summer of 2010, Weeden signed to Marousi BC in the tough and physical Greek First Division (Athens, Greece).

== College career ==
Weeden was the Mid-Continent 2003–04 All-Newcomer Team Member. He led his team in steals in that same year, led his team in 3pts made for four straight seasons, and ranked 10th on the All-Time scoring list at Chicago State University (NCAA).

== Awards and accomplishments ==
2010: Playoffs Bronze Medal Recipient

Selected for the PLK All-Star Game
Selected for the Import Stars vs. Polish National Team

2008: Kentucky Pro-Am All Tournament

2007: Led Team in Free-Throw Percentage

2006: ABA All-Star Game Nominee

2005: Led Team in 3pts made & minutes played

Ranked 10 in CSU's All-time scoring list (803pts)

2004:Led team in steals (47)

NCAA Mid-Con All Newcomer Team
NCAA All Mid-Con Conference Honorable Mention
NCAA Mid-Con Conference Tournament Semi-finals

2002: Freshman of the year

First team All-Conference
