= Andrew DeClercq =

American professional basketball player and coach

Personal information
- Born: February 1, 1973 (age 53) Detroit, Michigan, U.S.
- Listed height: 6 ft 10 in (2.08 m)
- Listed weight: 255 lb (116 kg)

Career information
- High school: Countryside (Clearwater, Florida)
- College: Florida (1991–1995)
- NBA draft: 1995: 2nd round, 34th overall pick
- Drafted by: Golden State Warriors
- Playing career: 1995–2005
- Position: Center / power forward
- Number: 55, 45
- Coaching career: 2009–present

Career history

Playing
- 1995–1997: Golden State Warriors
- 1997–1999: Boston Celtics
- 1999–2000: Cleveland Cavaliers
- 2000–2005: Orlando Magic

Coaching
- 2009–2010: Montverde Academy
- 2010–2012: Foundation Academy

Career NBA statistics
- Points: 2,815 (4.8 ppg)
- Rebounds: 2,488 (4.2 rpg)
- Assists: 339 (0.6 apg)
- Stats at NBA.com
- Stats at Basketball Reference
Medals
Men's basketball
Representing United States
Goodwill Games
| Bronze medal – third place | 1994 St. Petersburg | National team |

Andrew Donald DeClercq (born February 1, 1973) is an American former professional basketball player and current coach. He was a center and power forward in the National Basketball Association (NBA) for ten seasons during the 1990s and 2000s. DeClercq played college basketball for the University of Florida, and thereafter, he played professionally for the Golden State Warriors, Boston Celtics, Cleveland Cavaliers, and Orlando Magic of the NBA.

Born in Detroit, Michigan, in 1973, DeClercq accepted an athletic scholarship to attend the University of Florida in Gainesville, Florida, where he played center for coach Lon Kruger's Florida Gators men's basketball team from 1991 to 1995. He was a key starter for the Gators in the run to their first NCAA Final Four appearance in 1994. DeClercq graduated from Florida with a bachelor's degree in history in 1995.

The Golden State Warriors selected DeClercq in the second round (thirty-fourth pick overall) in the 1995 NBA draft, and he played for the Warriors for the following two seasons. He went on to play for the Boston Celtics, the Cleveland Cavaliers and Orlando Magic, averaging 4.8 points and 4.2 rebounds per game.

After retiring from the NBA, DeClerq was an assistant coach for the nationally ranked Montverde Academy boys' basketball team under head coach Kevin Sutton. In 2010, he became the head coach of the boys' varsity team and a physical education teacher at Foundation Academy.

Until 2014, he owned and operated DeClercq Basketball which runs youth basketball day camps, training and clinics in central Florida.

DeClercq lives in Clermont, Florida, where, as of 2017, he is the executive pastor of HighPoint Church in Ocoee, Florida.

== See also ==
- List of Florida Gators in the NBA
- List of University of Florida alumni
