= Smoke (50 Cent song) =

Single by 50 Cent featuring Trey Songz

from the album Animal Ambition
- Released: March 31, 2014
- Recorded: 2013
- Genre: East Coast hip-hop
- Length: 3:51
- Label: G-Unit; Caroline
- Songwriters: Curtis Jackson; Andre Young; Dawaun Parker; Tremaine Neverson; Mark Batson; Tony Scales
- Producers: Dr. Dre; Dawaun Parker (co.)

50 Cent singles chronology
"Pilot" (2014)	"Smoke" (2014)	"Hustler" (2014)

Trey Songz singles chronology
"You're Mine (Eternal)" (2014)	"Smoke" (2014)	"SmartPhones" (2014)

Music video
- "Smoke" on YouTube

"Smoke" is a song by American hip-hop recording artist 50 Cent, released on March 31, 2014, as the fourth single from his fifth studio album Animal Ambition (2014). The song features singer Trey Songz and is produced by Dr. Dre and Dawaun Parker. This is the only song of Animal Ambition that is produced by 50 Cent's longtime mentor Dr. Dre. The music video on YouTube has received over 10 million views as of April 2024.

== Background ==
Dr. Dre, Dawaun Parker and Mark Batson developed the instrumental for "Smoke" during recording sessions in Hawaii; at first, it was intended for Dr. Dre's unreleased album Detox. 50 Cent was enlisted to write Dr. Dre's lyrics, but later asked Dr. Dre if he could keep the song for himself and write lyrics to it from his own perspective, which Dr. Dre agreed to. The chorus was originally written for R. Kelly to perform, but for unknown reasons this plan fell through, so it was offered to Trey Songz instead.

== Track listing ==
Digital single

1. "Smoke"

== Chart performance ==
Chart (2014)	Peak position
Australia Urban (ARIA)	36
Belgium (Ultratip Bubbling Under Wallonia)	49
Germany (Deutsche Black Charts)	1
South Korea International Songs (Gaon)	53
UK Hip Hop/R&B (Official Charts)	23
UK Singles (The Official Charts Company)	154
US Hot R&B/Hip-Hop Songs (Billboard)	42

== Release history ==
Region	Date	Format	Label
United States	March 31, 2014	Mainstream urban radio	G-Unit Records; Caroline Records
United Kingdom	May 2, 2014	Urban contemporary radio	G-Unit Records; Caroline Records
