= Don't Worry 'Bout It =

Single by 50 Cent featuring Yo Gotti

from the album Animal Ambition
- Released: March 18, 2014
- Recorded: 2013
- Genre: Hip-hop
- Length: 4:01
- Label: G-Unit; Caroline
- Songwriters: Curtis Jackson; Mario Mims; Charlie Barrionoevo
- Producer: Charli Brown Beatz

50 Cent singles chronology
"We Up" (2013)	"Don't Worry 'Bout It" (2014)	"Hold On" (2014)

Yo Gotti singles chronology
"Yayo" (2014)	"Don't Worry 'Bout It" (2014)	"Maybe" (2014)

"Don't Worry 'Bout It" is a song by American hip-hop recording artist 50 Cent, released on March 18, 2014 as the first single from his fifth studio album Animal Ambition (2014). The song features a guest verse by fellow American rapper Yo Gotti and was produced by Charli Brown Beatz. The music video on YouTube has received over 10 million views as of April 2024.

== Track listing ==
Digital single

- "Don't Worry 'Bout It"

== Chart performance ==
Chart (2014)	Peak position
Australian Urban Singles Chart (ARIA)	32
UK Singles (The Official Charts Company)	165
UK Hip Hop/R&B (Official Charts)	30
US Hot R&B/Hip-Hop Songs (Billboard)	42
