= Mark Battles =

American rapper (born 1991)

- Born: Mark Anthony Battles; September 2, 1991 (age 35); Indianapolis, Indiana, U.S.
- Genre: Hip hop
- Occupations: Rapper; songwriter; entrepreneur; record producer
- Instrument: Vocals
- Years active: 2011–present
- Label: Independent

Mark Anthony Battles (born September 2, 1991) is an American rapper, songwriter, and record producer from Indianapolis, Indiana.

In 2011, Battles released his first project Good Morning America and gained recognition for his single Last Night, after placing second on MTVu and being remixed by Kid Ink. In 2015, Battles released his debut studio album Numb, which peaked in Billboard's Top Hip-Hop/R&B charts followed by a second album in 2016 called Before The Deal, peaking at #15 on the Heatseekers chart. Battles has released numerous projects and collaborations with Dizzy Wright, French Montana, Ab-Soul, Kevin Gates, Curren$y, and Tory Lanez.

Since 2017, Battles has been mentored and managed as an independent artist by music executive Coach K of Quality Control Music. Collectively, Battles has amassed more than 50 million streams on digital platforms such as Spotify and YouTube Music, touring periodically across America, making him one of the most commercially successful rappers from Indianapolis.

== Early life ==
Battles was born on September 2, 1991, in Indianapolis. His mother is Chiffonda Ducking. He grew up with two brothers named Anthony and Carl as well as one sister. Battles and his siblings were raised in an urban, marginalized community of Indianapolis, having lived in several homeless shelters during the early part of his childhood.

Battles began rapping under a different stage name. He graduated from Pike High School as part of Class of 2009 in northern Indianapolis. His inspiration for music is said to originate from industry icons such as Big Pun, Drake, Eminem, and 2Pac.

On August 31, 2006, his brother Carl was riding the backseat of his sibling's car to school. In the morning hours, his sibling's car collided with a pick up truck near Pike High School. Mark and his siblings were rushed to the hospital. However, shortly after arriving at the hospital, Mark's brother, Carl, was pronounced dead. Local media in Indiana reported speeding incidents in the area and prompted officials to enforce speed cameras in the roads near the school. In songs performed by Battles, including One For The Money, he pays tribute to his brother Carl.

== Musical career ==
=== 2011–2012: Career beginnings ===
Battles started rapping officially at age 15. Mark started his own independent record label labeled Fly America in 2011, a brand that is heard throughout his music. In 2011, Mark released his first mixtape called Good Morning America earning airplay in local radio. In 2012, Battles released Walking Distance with appearances by Kid Ink, Lola Monroe and King Los. Walking Distance went on to be certified gold on DatPiff. Battles' single Last Night was remixed by Kid Ink. Most of his mixtape was produced by DJ and music producer DJ Yung 1. Battles' most famous singles were "Ugh Oh" featuring Los and Last Night, which was featured on MTVu Freshman and hit second place for air time on MTV.

Battles has remixed numerous famous hip hop songs which have appeared on his mixtapes. In November 2012, he released the first part of his mixtape series Saturday School. Mark Battles also went on tour with MMG recording artist Rockie Fresh.

=== 2013–2015: Mixtape Series & Numb ===
In 2013, Battles released his three-part Saturday School mixtape series, along with a national tour that included a sold-out show alongside Bad Boy rapper MGK. On December 27, 2013, he released his collaboration mixtape with King Los. The mixtape Broken Silence was released in 2013 and artists featured include Wale, Curren$y, Ab-Soul, French Montana, Dizzy Wright, Cyhi Da Prynce and Chevy Woods. The first single was released titled "Got A Feeling" which featured Wale and Derek Luh. On August 12, 2014, Battles released another mixtape titled Preseason.

On October 2, 2015, Battles released his debut studio album Numb, which was released independently. The album peaked at #25 on the U.S. Billboard Hip-Hop/R&B charts.

=== 2016-2017: Before The Deal & Day 2 ===
On May 13, 2016, Battles announced on his Twitter account a partnership with iconic music producer No ID's record label ARTium Recordings. The deal came after the release of a dozen musical projects and national tours, respectively. Shortly after, Battles announced his latest musical project Before The Deal and released a music video for the single "No Love" featuring Futuristic and King Los.

On May 31, 2016, Battles released his second studio album Before the Deal, for digital release. Within a couple of hours after its release, the album peaked at #8 on the Top Rap album charts on Apple's iTunes store. On the week of June 18, 2016, Before the Deal debuted on Billboard's Top Heatseekers charts at #15. A nationwide tour was announced called "The Before The Deal Tour," which began in June 2016. Throughout 2016, Battles has collaborated with several recording artists including Dizzy Wright, Audio Push and Locksmith. In Summer of 2016, Mark Battles became one of three artists as part of Dizzy Wright's "Still Movin" tour with Audio Push.

In September 2016, Battles collaborated with fellow Indianapolis native Dorian for the official remix of Dorian's hit single Don't Sleep.

In November 2016, Battles was interviewed by XXL magazine, in which he stated he described his relationship with producer NO I.D. as "the new kid on the block." After the radio interview, several hip hop artists including Nebraska rapper HAKIM, expressed their inspiration for Battles' rise.

On May 26, 2017, in collaboration with Quality Control Music executive Coach K, Battles released a studio album with Tory Lanez called Day 2, which received mainstream radio airplay in the US.

=== 2018-present: Vasi World EP, Paramount & Do Not Disturb ===
On February 9, 2018, Battles released his Vasi World EP in affiliation with Quality Control Music. The following month, he announced the Vasi World Spring Tour featuring DJ Yung 1, T.Fitz, 12Fifteen, and King Kap.

In June 2023, Battles discussed gun violence, mental health, and popular culture with Joey Florez on a podcast hosted by Bizzy Bone's colleague Demetrius Reynolds, stating he has been mentored by Kevin Lee, or Coach K, of Quality Control Music.

In May 2024, Battles released an album titled Do Not Disturb, garnering millions of digital streams within 24 hours of release.

== Discography ==
=== Studio albums ===
List of albums, with selected chart positions and sales figures
Title	Album details	Peak chart positions		
Title	Album details	Top Heatseekers	US R&B	US Hip-Hop
Numb	Released: October 2, 2015; Label: Independent; Formats: Digital	25	39	39

Title	Album details	Peak chart positions	
Title	Album details	Top Heatseekers	US R&B
Before The Deal	Released: May 31, 2016; Label: Independent; Formats: Digital	15	--

- Day 2 (2017)
- Metaphorically Speaking (2021)
- Paramount (2023)
- Do Not Disturb (2024)

=== Mixtapes ===
- Good Morning America (2011)
- Walking Distance (2012)
- Saturday School (2011)
- Saturday School 2 (2012)
- Saturday School 3 (2012)
- Broken Silence (2013)
- Black Einstein (2014)
- Preseason (2014)
- Lost In Reality (2015) (with Dizzy Wright and Euroz)
- Shelter Food (2015)
- Until September (2015)
- Vasi World (2018)
- Foturnate (2018)
- Fortunate2 (2019)

== Tours ==
Year	Tour Name
2018	Vasi World Spring Tour
2017	Day 2 Tour
2016	Still Movin Tour
2016	Indy Homecoming Show
2016	The Before The Deal Tour
2015	The Numb Tour
2014	The Dreams 2 Reality Tour

== See also ==
- Hip hop music
