= Mr. Probz =

Dutch singer (born 1984)

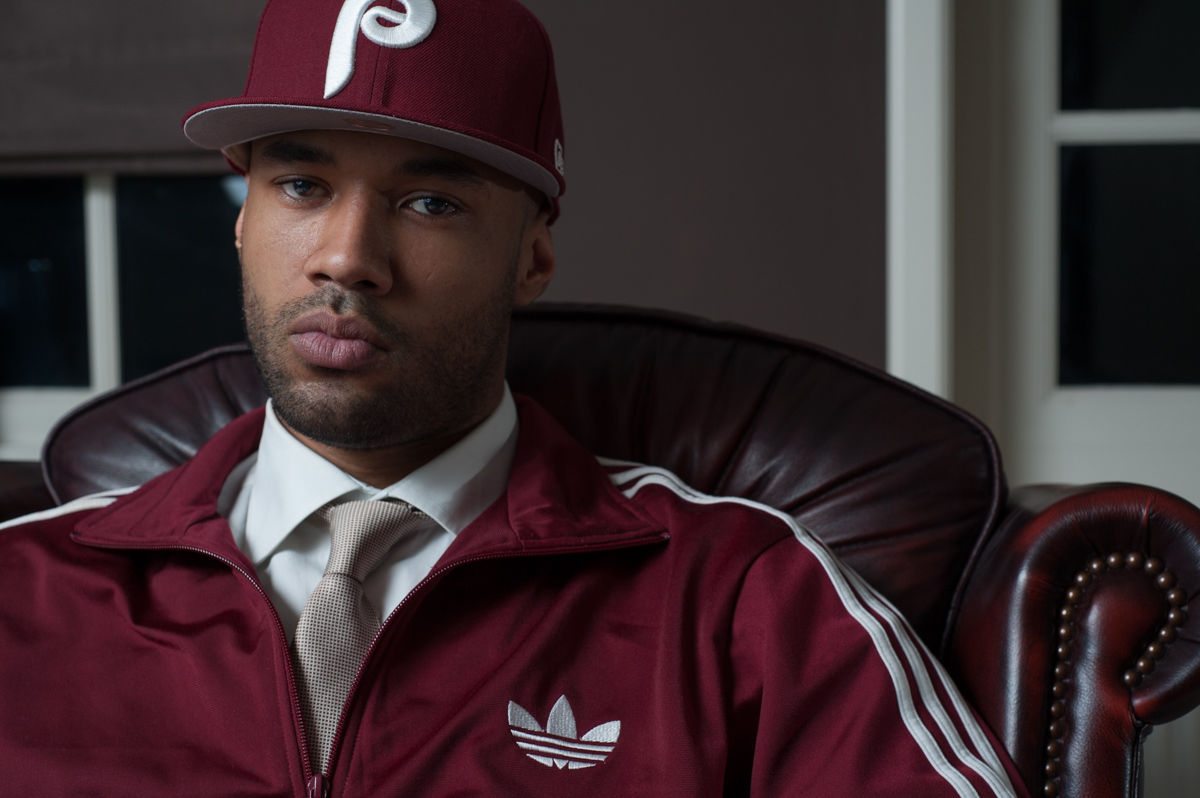
- Mr. Probz in 2013

Background information
- Also known as: Propaganda
- Born: Dennis Princewell Stehr; May 15, 1984 (age 42); Germany
- Origin: Zoetermeer, Netherlands
- Genres: Hip-hop; R&B; soul
- Occupations: Record producer; singer; songwriter; rapper; actor
- Years active: 1999–present
- Labels: Left Lane; RCA
- Website: mrprobz.com

Dennis Princewell Stehr (born May 15, 1984), known professionally as Mr. Probz, is a Dutch record producer, singer and rapper.

He became known for the songs "Drivin'", "Sukkel voor de liefde", "Nothing Really Matters", and his collaborations with American hip-hop acts. He made his mainstream breakthrough with his 2013 guitar ballad "Waves", which was remixed by German DJ Robin Schulz the following year. The remix peaked at number one in the charts of the United Kingdom, Germany, and Norway. Mr. Probz became the first Dutch artist to achieve one billion streams on Spotify. He has collaborated with Chris Brown, 50 Cent, Anderson .Paak, Afrojack, Armin van Buuren, Hardwell, Galantis and Dolly Parton, among others. In addition, Probz has been involved in real estate, and founded the record label Left Lane Recordings.

== Career ==
=== 2008–2013 ===
Mr. Probz began expressing himself creatively as a graffiti artist and later incorporated his daily activities into lyrics. In the first Dutch hip-hop film Bolletjes Blues (2006), he played the lead role of Jimmy. In 2010, Mr. Probz was nominated for a BNN/State Award in the 'Best Artist' category. On August 7, 2010, Mr. Probz and another rapper were shot in Amsterdam. This incident received a lot of media attention.

=== 2013–present ===
At the end of 2013, a fire erupted in Mr. Probz's studio and home in which he lost all his possessions except a box of important documents and a laptop with some of his compositions. Shortly after the fire, he achieved success with his first official single "Waves".

On September 16, 2013, Mr. Probz released his hip-hop solo album titled The Treatment. He decided to release his album for free in gratitude for all the support he received from his fans after the fire. With "Waves", Mr. Probz won several awards, including an Edison, national and international Buma Awards, 'Best Vocal' and 'Best Single' at the FunX Music Awards and 'Best Single' at the 3FM Awards. The multi-platinum single "Waves" still ranks the highest of all the singles on the Dutch charts since 1956. In April 2014, Mr. Probz released a remix of "Waves" by German DJ Robin Schulz. The single earned a Grammy nomination in the "Best Remixed Recording" category in 2015. He featured on 50 Cent's single "Twisted", which was released in May 2014.

In September 2014, Mr. Probz released the single "Nothing Really Matters". In October, "Nothing Really Matters" rose to first place in the charts in several European countries. In the Dutch Top 100 for singles, the song ranked first place for six weeks. In 2015, the single by Mr. Probz and DJ Armin van Buuren "Another You" reached the top of the Billboard dance chart. Following this success, it was announced in 2016 that Mr. Probz was participating in Armin van Buuren's world tour. In 2017, a documentary about Mr. Probz's life was released. This documentary, titled Against the Stream, was released through Red Bull TV and RTL5. Mr. Probz scored a hit with "Faith" in 2019. He created this song in collaboration with the Swedish DJ duo Galantis and Dolly Parton.

In 2020, Mr. Probz and his label Left Lane Recordings sued the record company Sony Music for allegedly failing to comply with the licensing agreement and paying royalties in a timely manner. In the summary proceedings, the court ruled in favor of Mr. Probz and his label Left Lane Recordings. According to the ruling, Sony Music defaulted on its contractual obligations, this allowed Mr. Probz to regain control of the exploitation of his music. In 2022, Mr. Probz again filed legal proceedings against Sony Music, accusing Sony Music of deliberately failing to calculate his cut of any income on an 'at source' basis and of withholding bookkeeping files that his accountants need to see to effectively audit the money he is due.

Mr. Probz is among the top-earning Dutch artists along with Martin Garrix, Afrojack, Tiësto, Armin van Buuren, Giorgio Tuinfort and André Rieu.

== Discography ==
=== Albums ===
Title	Album details	Peak chart positions	
Title	Album details	NL	BEL
The Treatment	Released: September 16, 2013; Labels: Traumashop, Republic; Formats: CD, digital download	12	179

=== Extended plays ===
Title	EP details	Track listing
Against the Stream	Released: May 19, 2017; Label: Left Lane; Formats: CD, digital download	Track listing: 1. "American Dreaming"; 2. "Do It All Again"; 3. "Streets"; 4. "Tears Gone Bad"; 5. "Waves"

=== Singles ===
==== As lead artist ====
Title	Year	Peak chart positions										Certifications	Album
Title	Year	NL	AUS	BEL	DEN	GER	NOR	NZ	SWE	UK	US	Certifications	Album
"I'm Right Here"	2013	—	—	—	—	—	—	—	—	—	—		The Treatment
"Turning Tables"	2013	—	—	—	—	—	—	—	—	—	—		The Treatment
"Gold Days" (featuring Action Bronson)	2013	—	—	—	—	—	—	—	—	—	—		The Treatment
"Waves"^{[A]} (original or Robin Schulz remix)^{[B]}	2014	5	3	1	3	1	1	3	1	1	14	NVPI: 6× Platinum; ARIA: 4× Platinum; BPI: 4× Platinum; BRMA: Platinum; BVMI: 4× Platinum; GLF: 5× Platinum; IFPI DEN: 4× Platinum; RIAA: 2× Platinum; RMNZ: 6× Platinum	Against the Stream and Prayer
"Nothing Really Matters"	2014	1	—	3	37	82	28	—	15	72	—	NVPI: 4× Platinum; BRMA: Gold; GLF: 2× Platinum; IFPI DEN: Gold	Non-album singles
"Fine Ass Mess"	2016	54	—	—	—	—	—	—	—	—	—		Non-album singles
"Till You're Loved"	2017	88	—	—	—	—	—	—	—	—	—	NVPI: Gold	Non-album singles
"Tears Gone Bad"	2017	—	—	—	—	—	—	—	—	—	—		Against the Stream
"Streets"	2017	—	—	—	—	—	—	—	—	—	—		Against the Stream
"Gone" (featuring Anderson .Paak)	2017	— (Note: "Gone" did not enter any official Netherlands singles chart, such as the Dutch Top 40 or the Dutch Single Top 100. However, it did appear on their extensions, reaching number 19 on the Dutch Top 40's Tipparade and number 12 on the Single Top 100's Single Tip.)	—	—	—	—	—	—	—	—	—		Non-album singles
"Space for Two"	2018	43	—	—	—	—	35	—	— (Note: "Space for Two" did not enter the Swedish Singellista Chart, but peaked at number 15 on the Swedish Heatseeker Chart.)	—	—		Non-album singles
"Praying to a God"	2018	—	—	—	—	—	—	—	—	—	—		Non-album singles
"—" denotes a single that did not chart or was not released in that territory.

==== As featured artist ====
Title	Year	Peak chart positions							Certifications	Album
Title	Year	NL	BEL	GER	AUT	SWE	AUS	UK	Certifications	Album
"Welkom in ons leven" (Bolletjes Blues Cast featuring Negativ, Raymzter, Derenzo, Mr. Probz and Kimo)	2006	46	—	—	—	—	—	—		Non-album singles
"Gora Gora Rang (Fair-Skinned)" (Imran Khan featuring Mr. Probz)	2009	—	—	—	—	—	—	—		Unforgettable
"Meisje luister" (Kleine Viezerik featuring Mr. Probz)	2010	93	—	—	—	—	—	—		Non-album singles
"Sukkel voor de liefde" (The Opposites featuring Mr. Probz)	2013	10	43	—	—	—	—	—	NVPI: 2× Platinum	Slapeloze nachten
"Twisted" (50 Cent featuring Mr. Probz)	2014	—	80	—	—	—	—	—		Animal Ambition
"Little Secrets" (Professor Green featuring Mr. Probz)	2014	—	—	—	—	—	—	83		Growing Up in Public
"Another You" (Armin van Buuren featuring Mr. Probz)	2015	7	10	75	55	55	48	—	NVPI: Platinum; GLF: Gold	Embrace
"Faith" (Galantis and Dolly Parton featuring Mr. Probz)	2019	—	—	—	—	— (Note: "Faith" did not enter the Swedish Singellista Chart, but peaked at number one on the Swedish Heatseeker Chart.)	—	—	RIAA: Gold	Church
"—" denotes a single that did not chart or was not released in that territory.

== Other appearances ==
List of non-single guest appearances, with other performing artists, showing year released and album name
Title	Year	Other artist(s)	Album
"Long Way to Go"	2007	Joe Budden	Mood Muzik 3: The Album
"Wake Up"	2010	Thug Lordz, The Jacka	Thug Money
"No Surrender"	2013	Lloyd Banks	A.O.N. (All Or Nothing) Series Vol. 1: F.N.O. (Failure's No Option)
"Birds Fly"	2014	Hardwell	United We Are
"Hustle"	2014	M.O.P.	Street Certified
