= Los (rapper) =

American rapper

King Los
- Also known as: King Los
- Born: Carlos Coleman; Baltimore, Maryland, U.S.
- Genres: Hip hop
- Occupations: Rapper; songwriter
- Years active: 1999–present
- Labels: After Platinum; 88 Classic; Bad Boy; Bloc Incorporated
- Children: 1

Carlos Coleman, better known by his stage name King Los or simply Los, is an American rapper and songwriter from Baltimore, Maryland. He is best known for his affiliation with American rapper Puff Daddy, having frequently served as his ghostwriter and been signed to his label, Bad Boy Records from 2005 until 2008. Coleman re-signed to the label in February 2012, although he departed once more in March 2014. His debut studio album, God, Money, War (2015), was released by RCA Records and entered the Billboard 200; Puff Daddy executive produced the album.

== Career ==
=== 1999–2010 ===
As an 18-year-old high school student, Coleman started as a rapper with his main subject being the murder of his father. In 2002 Los auditioned for Diddy's Making the Band 2, but after being selected to appear on the show, he refused to sign any of the paperwork required so he was unable to appear on it. Later, Coleman would end up signed to Bad Boy Records in 2005 through Da Bloc Incorporated, a local Baltimore record label. Da Bloc Incorporated eventually disbanded due to a legal issue and Los lost his deal in 2008 before he was able to release an album.

In 2008 Los released a number of mixtapes and online freestyles. His first and second would be Guilty Until Proven Innocent and G5: Certified Fly, both released in 2008. He followed that with G5.2 in May 2009. His third mixtape Zero Gravity was released during April 2010. Then, the mixtape was Welcome To Swaggsville was released on August 5, 2010. His sixth mixtape Shooter was released on November 8, 2010. It featured collaborations with Rick Ross and his After Platinum label-mate Cory Gunz. On December 26, 2010, Los released his seventh mixtape The Louis Vuitton Gift Pack. The mixtape was primarily composed of freestyles and featured a collaboration with Chris Brown.

=== 2011–2013: The Crown Ain't Safe and Becoming King ===
On July 18, 2011, Los released a mixtape titled Worth the Wait, mostly made of tracks cut from his mixtape The Crown Ain't Safe. On December 5, 2011, Los released The Crown Ain't Safe. The mixtape featured guest appearances by Lola Monroe, Jazze Pha, DMX, Kid Ink, Twista and XV. Along with production by Jahlil Beats, Lifted, J. Oliver and Rick Steel, among others. It was met with decent critical reception upon release. On February 6, 2012, Diddy announced to MTV that his newest signee to Bad Boy Records was Los. Right after the announcement Coleman began working on his debut mixtape for Bad Boy.

Bad Boy released the mixtape Becoming King on April 25, 2013. The mixtape featured all-original music and numerous guest artists. Production was handled by 1500 or Nothin', Harry Fraud, J. Oliver, Rob Holladay and Sonny Digital, among others. Becoming King was met with generally positive reviews from music critics. XXL gave the mixtape a positive review saying, "There are heartfelt tales touching on his family, love for music and the trials and tribulations of life. As usual, Los’ strongest asset is an ability to deliver vivid imagery through lyrics and a captivating flow[...] Lyrically...the mixtape is a continuation of the verbal assaults he's known for."

=== 2013–present: Departure from Bad Boy and signed to RCA ===
Los was featured on labelmate French Montana's song "Ocho Cinco" also featuring labelmates Diddy, Red Cafe and MGK taken from the deluxe edition of Montana's album Excuse My French. On August 13, 2013, Los released a freestyle over the controversial "Control" song. He was then featured on "No Option" by Kid Ink, a promotional single from Ink's second studio album My Own Lane. On December 28, 2013, Los released Broken Silence, a collaboration mixtape with rapper Mark Battles. The mixtape featured guest appearances from Wale among others.

Following the announcement of the mixtape Zero Gravity II, on March 19, 2014, Los revealed that he was leaving Bad Boy Records and Interscope. He later elaborated on the story to MTV saying, "I've chose to explore other endeavors just like my mentor; just like Puff."

On March 24, 2014, Los released his twelfth official mixtape Zero Gravity II. Following that, from April 1 to May 31, 2014, Los toured with collaborator Kid Ink as a supporting act on the My Own Lane concert tour.

On October 23, 2014 Los made an appearance on HOT 97's Ebro in the Morning radio show and confirmed a new deal with RCA Records and 88 Classic, with the only details revealed being the announcement of P. Diddy being an executive producer for his pre-debut album, titled God, Money, War, with RCA and 88 Classic. It was released June 23, 2015. On August 19, 2015, Los appeared on Why? with Hannibal Buress, performing the title track from God, Money, War. Los then went on to perform on the God, Money, War Tour along with fellow rapper Skate Maloley and others. He was one of many features on P. Diddy's mixtape MMM, Lil Wayne's mixtape No Ceilings 2 and later Wiz Khalifa's mixtape Cabin Fever 3.

On July 3, 2015 Los appeared in Damond Blue's music video "Lemme Talk My Sh*t". In 2018, it was announced that Los would be his battle rap return with Rare Breed Entertainment. His opponent was originally slated to be the West Coast battle rap veteran, Daylyt. However a month before the event, Daylyt dropped out and was replaced by East Coast rapper and battle rap veteran, Head ICE. The battle with Head ICE took place in August 2018 with Los receiving widespread acclaim for his performance and lyricism from the battle rap community. In 2021 Rare Breed Entertainment held this delayed match between King Los and Daylyt at their Max Out 2 Battle Rap event. In November of the same year, Los appeared on the Ultimate Rap League's Volume 8 card, battling DNA.

== Personal life ==
The rapper's wife LoLa Monroe gave birth to a boy in March 2013.

== Discography ==
=== Studio albums ===
List of albums with selected chart positions
Title	Album details	Peak chart positions		
Title	Album details	US	US R&B	US Rap
God, Money, War	Release: June 23, 2015; Label: After Platinum, RCA; Format: CD, digital download	68	5	4

=== Mixtapes ===
- G5: Certified Fly (2008)
- Welcome to Swaggsville (2009)
- 2 Seconds From Greatness (2009)
- G5.2 (2009)
- Zero Gravity (2010)
- G.U.S.A of America (2010)
- Shooter (hosted by DJ ill Will & DJ Rockstar) (2010)
- The Louis Vuitton Gift Pack (2010)
- Worth the Wait (2011)
- The Crown Ain't Safe (hosted by DJ ill Will & DJ Drama) (2011)
- Becoming King (2013) (hosted by Yung Berg)
- Broken Silence (with Mark Battles) (2013)
- Zero Gravity II (2014)(Hosted By Yung berg)
- G.O.A.T. Tape (2017)
- Moor Bars (2017)
- 410 Survival Kit (2018)
- G.O.A.T. Tape 2 (2022)

=== EPs ===
- I Am Not A Industry Plant EP (2017)
- 4 Peace Nugget (2021)

=== Singles ===
==== As a lead artist ====
List of singles, showing year released and album name
Title	Year	Album
"Only One of Me"	2014	—N/a
"War" (featuring Marsha Ambrosius)	2015	God, Money, War
"Can't Fade Us" (featuring Ty Dolla $ign)	2015	God, Money, War
"Ghetto Boy"	2015	God, Money, War
"Glory to the Lord" (featuring R. Kelly)	2015	God, Money, War

==== As a featured artist ====
List of singles, showing year released and album name
Title	Year	Album
"On This Side" (Dirti Diana featuring Phreshy Duzit, Cory Gunz and Los)	2013	R.I.P. To The Competition

=== Other charted songs ===
List of singles, with selected chart positions, showing year released and album name
Title	Year	Peak chart positions		Album
Title	Year	US	US R&B	Album
"Ocho Cinco" (French Montana featuring Machine Gun Kelly, Diddy, Red Cafe and Los)	2013	—	52	Mac & Cheese 3 and Excuse My French
"—" denotes a recording that did not chart or was not released in that territories

=== Guest appearances ===
- 05. "Auction" (with Puff Daddy, Lil' Kim, & Styles P) on MMM (Money Making Mitch)
- 06. "MMM" (with Puff Daddy, & Future) on MMM (Money Making Mitch)
