= Animal Ambition =

Studio album by 50 Cent
- Released: June 3, 2014
- Recorded: 2010–2014
- Genre: Hip-hop
- Length: 39:14
- Labels: G-Unit; Caroline
- Producers: 50 Cent (exec.); Frank Dukes; Jake One; Dr. Dre; Dawaun Parker; Dot N Pro; Mark Batson; Charli Brown Beatz; Swiff D; Shamtrax; Steve Alien; G Rocka; Medi; The University; Ky Miller; Ty Fyffe; Soul Professa; Nascent; QB

50 Cent chronology
5 (Murder by Numbers) (2012)	Animal Ambition (2014)	The Kanan Tape (2015)

Singles from Animal Ambition
- 1. "Don't Worry 'Bout It" Released: March 18, 2014; 2. "Hold On" Released: March 18, 2014; 3. "Pilot" Released: March 25, 2014; 4. "Smoke" Released: March 31, 2014; 5. "Hustler" Released: April 15, 2014; 6. "Chase the Paper" Released: April 22, 2014; 7. "Everytime I Come Around" Released: April 29, 2014; 8. "Irregular Heartbeat" Released: May 6, 2014; 9. "Winners Circle" Released: May 13, 2014; 10. "Twisted" Released: May 20, 2014; 11. "Animal Ambition" Released: May 30, 2014

Animal Ambition: An Untamed Desire to Win, more commonly known as just Animal Ambition, is the fifth studio album by American rapper 50 Cent. It was released on June 3, 2014, by G-Unit Records and Caroline. All 11 tracks on the standard edition were issued as singles prior to the album's release. The album features guest appearances from Yo Gotti, Trey Songz, Kidd Kidd, Jadakiss, Mr. Probz, Guordan Banks, Prodigy, Schoolboy Q and Styles P.

Animal Ambition debuted at number four on the US Billboard 200, giving 50 Cent his fifth consecutive top five album in the country, while also debuting at number one on Billboard's Independent Albums chart.

== Background ==
On December 4, 2013, while doing a press run for the launch of his SMS Audio line of headphones and speakers, 50 Cent announced that a "full body of work", titled Animal Ambition would be released in January 2014. In a December 2013, interview with DJ Whoo Kid, he reiterated plans for the album, saying: "I'm going to drop it in January, it's a full body of work, I wouldn't call it a mixtape because it's a higher grade than the material that I put out on mixtapes. I recorded so many album quality songs that I'm going to put the Animal project out as my viral marketing plan and then it will come out after, Street King Immortal." In January 2014, while visiting the Consumer Electronics Show, he explained his motivation to release new music in early 2014, saying: "I'm so anxious to put out material. It took me so long to get the business portion of music straight, because I had gone through an auditing process because it was the last record required for Interscope Records. And now, I got Animal Ambition, I was inspired to write this. It really has to be current. If it's not like right now, what I feel is like the hottest thing, I know it's done right, but it's not necessarily what I should be doing right now."

In a January 2014 interview with Sonic Electronix, he said that he was recording heavily in preparation for both of the albums, saying, "I want to put Animal Ambition out in the first quarter. And then it'll lead up to Street King Immortal. So it'll be twelve weeks. That's why I'm working so hard, when I leave here I go straight back to record again." He also said that Animal Ambition has a shared sound and theme throughout, saying, "With Animal Ambition, the project is about prosperity. I got an interesting way of writing it, 'cause I wrote it from a distorted vision or viewpoint. When Biggie was doing 'Damn, niggas wanna stick me for my paper, damn,' that's about when you get something, the effects of others responding to you doing better. The jealousies connected to it, there's so many different ways to write it, that the album has those facets to it. The overall theme is ambition and prosperity."

In a January 2014 interview with Complex, he announced that he would release the album before Street King Immortal, saying:

"There's an album I am putting out before Street King Immortal. The title is called Animal Ambition. It's an untamed desire to win. The record is overall about prosperity, ambition, and has an entrepreneurial energy—it's all from a distorted perspective. I just been really excited about the concept, been writing and had a lot of time to create material for the release because it's taken so long. So when you listen the record, you'll see it because I told you it, it's about ambition. If I didn't say that, you wouldn't listen to the record and say what's that song called? Cause when Biggie was saying, 'Damn, niggas wanna stick me for my paper,' that's writing prosperity, but the effects of it from others. Jealousy is created from you moving forward. I wrote it from a lot of different angles in order to create an album with all the facets I was comfortable with so it could all have one thing."

On February 20, 2014, 50 Cent left Shady Records, Aftermath Entertainment and Interscope Records, after a 12-year union and subsequently signed himself and G-Unit Records to Caroline, an independent distributor of Capitol Music Group. On the same day, he announced that the album would be released on June 3, 2014. In a February 2014 interview with Forbes detailing his departure from Interscope, 50 stated, "I'm a special case and situation. It's also because of the leverage of having the strong relationships with Eminem and Dr. Dre. They don't want me to be uncomfortable. They value our friendship to the point that they would never want [to jeopardize] it over that little bit of money."

== Release and promotion ==
In a May 2014, interview with the Business News Network, he spoke about the album's promotional campaign, saying: "I actually decided to create a campaign for the actual record that can sustain the audience. Because it has to sustain your interest for one week until the next song comes, until the next song comes, until the next song comes. And the actual visuals match the song so if you weren't impressed by the music you'll understand creatively why it's the way it is when you see the images. It's obviously a more complex presentation because you have to be really premeditated. You have to know what each one of your songs are gonna feel like. We only needed to know what three looked like. With three records because we're only shooting three music videos before you sold millions of records. The adjustments are technology." In June 2014, 50 announced that he would be accepting Bitcoin payments for the album, making him one of the biggest artists to use the cryptocurrency to date.

== Singles ==
On February 21, 2014, the music video was released for "The Funeral". On March 18, 2014, the songs "Don't Worry 'Bout It", featuring Yo Gotti and "Hold On", were released via digital distribution, as the album's first and second singles. On March 18, 2014, the music video was released for "Hold On". On the same day, the music video was released for "Don't Worry 'Bout It" featuring Yo Gotti. On March 25, 2014, the album's third single "Pilot" was released. On the same day, the music video was released for "Pilot". On March 31, 2014, the album's fourth single "Smoke" featuring Trey Songz and produced by Dr. Dre was serviced to mainstream urban radio in the United States. The following day, the music video was released for "Smoke" featuring Trey Songz. On April 15, 2014, the album's fifth single "Hustler" was released. On the same day, the music video for "Hustler" was released.

On April 21, 2014, the music video for "Chase the Paper" featuring Prodigy, Kidd Kidd and Styles P premiered on MTV Jams. The following day, "Chase the Paper" was released as the album's sixth single. On April 29, 2014, the album's seventh single "Everytime I Come Around" featuring Kidd Kidd was released. On the same day, the music video was released for "Everytime I Come Around". On May 6, 2014, the album's eighth single "Irregular Heartbeat" featuring Jadakiss and Kidd Kidd was released. On the same day, the music video was released for "Irregular Heartbeat". On May 13, 2014, the album's ninth single "Winners Circle" featuring Guordan Banks was released. On the same day, the music video was released for "Winners Circle" featuring Guordan Banks. On May 19, 2014, the music video was released for "Twisted" featuring Mr. Probz. On May 20, 2014, the album's tenth single "Twisted" featuring Mr. Probz was released. On May 30, 2014, the album's eleventh single "Animal Ambition" was released. On June 3, 2014, the music video was released for "Animal Ambition". On June 24, 2014, the music video was released for "You Know".

== Critical response ==
Professional ratings
Aggregate scores
Source	Rating
Metacritic	53/100
Review scores
Source	Rating
AllMusic	3/5 stars
Exclaim!	6/10
HipHopDX	2.0/5
Los Angeles Times	2/4 stars
The Observer	2/5 stars
New York Daily News	3/5 stars
Pitchfork	4.9/10
Rolling Stone	3/5 stars
USA Today	2/4 stars
XXL	(XL)

Animal Ambition was met with generally mixed reviews. At Metacritic, which assigns a normalized rating out of 100 to reviews from critics, the album received an average score of 53, which indicates "mixed or average reviews", based on 15 reviews. Killian Fox of The Guardian wrote "unchanged are his limitations as a rapper, both technically and in his choice of subjects." Also adding, "The theme here, we are told, is prosperity and its discontents, but he doesn't do much more than flaunt it and berate people for hating his success." Sheldon Pearce of HipHopDX said, "This release was essentially pitched as a concept album on how wealth alters perception and inspires envy, and though it's possible to follow this loose narrative, the execution of this idea is thoroughly botched. In truth, this wouldn't be so difficult to stomach if he wasn't still rapping (both lyrically and contextually) like it's 2004. Animal Ambition is a drastically underperformed gut punch marred by its own limitations and its obsessive portrayal of self-worth amid a recitation of Get Rich or Die Tryin' buzzwords." David Jeffries of AllMusic said, "Consider it the album before the album, and it plays out as interesting and often awesome, but put this next to his major works and it seems a bit off and quirky." Simon Vozick-Levinson of Rolling Stone wrote "Tracks like "Hold On" and "Pilot" have all the smirking charm of 50's glory days. At their best, they can even recall his time as a mixtape hustler with a world to conquer and nothing to lose."

Jabbari Weekes of Exclaim! wrote "Animal Ambition showcases a very creatively confused 50 Cent, trapped in some sort of musical purgatory we can only hope he find his way out of." Brandon Soderberg of Spin said, "Animal Ambition half-assedly pimps the phony idea perpetuated by his Jesse Pinkman-like core fans and an increasingly clueless 50 Cent himself: that his success was built on bona fide gangster rap swagger rather than incredibly accessible club bangers." Ian Cohen of Pitchfork Media said, "There may not be much Curtis Jackson on Animal Ambition, but it does give an accurate survey of where 50 Cent is at right now." Eric Diep of XXL said, "50 Cent's credibility as a viable solo artist is still being tested every day. In a rare occasion for Fif, Animal Ambition has got everyone back on the 50 bandwagon and rooting for the second wind in his career. Now, with talks of a G-Unit album later this year, 50 Cent is on the fast-track to becoming the unstoppable force he once was. All of this only means 50 has to push even harder to elevate his status to that level, and with Animal Ambition, he shows he's ready to put in the work." Jordan Sowunmi of Now said, "The album has a few bright spots: on Irregular Heartbeat, the emcee snarls the stone-faced threats that made him an irresistible menace in the early aughts. But it's not enough to save an album that's bogged down by a rapper – and production – stuck in the middle of the last decade." Jesse Cataldo of Slant Magazine wrote "It's unfortunate that 50 Cent can't offer more, tackling his anxieties head-on rather than burying them under the guise of shopworn gangster narratives, but while simple pleasures are about all Animal Ambition can offer, it at least presents them with listenable panache."

== Commercial performance ==
Animal Ambition debuted at number four on the Billboard 200 chart, with first-week sales of 46,000 copies in the United States giving 50 Cent his fifth consecutive top 5 album in the country. In its second week, the album dropped to number 15 on the chart, selling 17,000 copies. In its third week, the album dropped to number 23 on the chart, selling 10,000 copies. In its fourth week, the album dropped to number 39 on the chart, selling 7,200 copies. As of December 2014, the album has sold 124,000 copies in the United States.

Animal Ambition also debuted at number one on Billboard's Independent Album's Chart.

== Track listing ==
Animal Ambition track listing
No.	Title	Writer(s)	Producer(s)	Length
1.	"Hold On"	Curtis Jackson; Joell Ortiz; Norman Whitfield; Barrett Strong; A. Feeney	Frank Dukes	3:46
2.	"Don't Worry 'Bout It" (featuring Yo Gotti)	Jackson; Mario Mims; C. Barrionoevo	Charli Brown Beatz	4:01
3.	"Animal Ambition"	Jackson; S. Thornton	Swiff D	3:08
4.	"Pilot"	Jackson; Curtis Mayfield; S. Patten	Shamtrax; Ky Miller (add.); Dot N Pro (add.)	3:20
5.	"Smoke" (featuring Trey Songz)	Jackson; Andre Young; Dawaun Parker; Tremaine Neverson; Mark Batson; T. Scales	Dr. Dre; Parker (co.)	3:50
6.	"Everytime I Come Around" (featuring Kidd Kidd)	Jackson; Curtis Stewart; Roby Facchinetti; S. Slang; Valerio Negrini	Steve Alien	3:10
7.	"Irregular Heartbeat" (featuring Jadakiss and Kidd Kidd)	Jackson; Stewart; Martin Rodriguez; G. Estrada	G Rocka; Medi	3:39
8.	"Hustler"	Jackson; Jacob Dutton	Jake One	3:05
9.	"Twisted" (featuring Mr. Probz)	Jackson; J. Woods; A. Caines	Capsvl; Just Hustle; Ky Miller (add.)	3:14
10.	"Winners Circle" (featuring Guordan Banks)	Jackson; K. Miller	Ky Miller	3:23
11.	"Chase the Paper" (featuring Prodigy, Kidd Kidd and Styles P)	Jackson; Tyrone Fyffe; Albert Johnson; C. Stewart; David Styles	Ty Fyffe; Ky Miller (add.)	4:17

Deluxe edition bonus tracks
No.	Title	Producer(s)	Length
12.	"The Funeral"	Jake One	2:52
13.	"You Know"	Soul Professa	3:01
14.	"Flip on You" (featuring Schoolboy Q)	Nascent; QB; Ky Miller (add.)	3:19

Deluxe edition bonus DVD
No.	Title	Length
1.	"Hold On"
2.	"Don't Worry About It"
3.	"Pilot"
4.	"Smoke"
5.	"I'm a Hustler"
6.	"Chase the Paper"
7.	"Every Time I Come Around"
8.	"Irregular Heartbeat"
9.	"Twisted"
10.	"Winner Circle"
11.	"Animal Ambition"
12.	"The Funeral"
13.	"U Know"

== Charts ==
=== Weekly charts ===
Weekly chart performance for Animal Ambition
Chart (2014)	Peak position
Australian Albums (ARIA)	16
Austrian Albums (Ö3 Austria)	38
Belgian Albums (Ultratop Flanders)	63
Belgian Albums (Ultratop Wallonia)	110
Canadian Albums (Billboard)	4
Dutch Albums (Album Top 100)	57
French Albums (SNEP)	32
German Albums (Offizielle Top 100)	35
Irish Albums (IRMA)	29
Italian Albums (FIMI)	85
Scottish Albums (Official Charts)	25
Swiss Albums (Schweizer Hitparade)	9
UK Albums (Official Charts)	21
UK R&B Albums (Official Charts)	1
US Billboard 200	4
US Independent Albums (Billboard)	1
US Top R&B/Hip-Hop Albums (Billboard)	1

=== Year-end charts ===
Year-end chart performance for Animal Ambition
Chart (2014)	Position
US Billboard 200	187
US Top R&B/Hip-Hop Albums	36
US Top Rap Albums	18
US Independent Albums	18
