= LoLa Monroe =

American rapper and actress

- Born: Fershgenet Melaku; October 23, 1986 (age 39); Addis Ababa, Ethiopia
- Origin: Washington, D.C., U.S.
- Genre: Hip hop
- Occupations: Rapper, actress
- Years active: 2005–present
- Labels: Blue Rose Entertainment, Taylor Gang (former)
- Spouse: King Los

Fershgenet Melaku (born October 23, 1986), better known as LoLa Monroe and previously known as Angel Melaku, is an American rapper and actress.

== Early life ==
Melaku was born in Addis Ababa, Ethiopia, and raised in Washington D.C. She is of Ethiopian descent. She began writing poems and songs at the age of 12.

== Career ==
Monroe made her acting debut in the Wendy Williams biopic Queen of Media and later acted in Crazy like a Fox. She began modeling and appearing in music videos for various artists such as Kanye West and Trey Songz. She later became LoLa Monroe in 2007; "Monroe" is a reference to the actress, model, film producer and singer Marilyn Monroe.

In June 2009, Monroe released her first mixtape, Boss Bitch's World. Her second mixtape, The Lola Monroe Chronicles: The Art of Motivation, was issued in October. She also released her collaboration mixtape Untouchables later the same year.

In September 2010, Monroe released her mixtape's first single, "Overtime". A video for the song was also recorded and premiered on 106 & Park. In December 2010, LoLa released her fourth mixtape, Batteries Not Included.

Monroe was nominated for Best Female Hip Hop Artist at the BET Awards of 2011.

In October 2011, Monroe was announced as Taylor Gang's first lady, and signed to the label. Her first mixtape to be released under the label was Lipstick & Pistols. After many push backs, the mixtape released on October 23, 2013.

On September 4, 2013, she released her debut single "B.B. (Boss Bitch)" featuring Chevy Woods and Juicy J, produced by Sledgren and supposed to be on her debut album. Then on September 19, she along with producer Cardo left Taylor Gang and dismissed their affiliation with the label. LoLa Monroe later confirmed that she had never signed to the label in the first place.

Artists who have influenced her musical style include Jay-Z, MC Lyte, Trina, Salt-n-Pepa, Lauryn Hill and Tupac Shakur.

== Personal life ==
On December 25, 2012, Monroe announced that she and rapper King Los were expecting their first child together. She gave birth to a boy in March 2013.

== Discography ==
=== Mixtapes ===
- Boss Bitch's World (2009)
- The Lola Monroe Chronicles: The Art of Motivation (2009)
- Untouchables (with Lil Boosie) (2009)
- Batteries Not Included (2010)
- Lipstick & Pistols (2013)
- Boss Bitch's World 2 (2013)

=== Singles ===
List of singles, with selected chart positions, showing year released and album name
Title	Year	Peak chart positions			Album
Title	Year	US	US R&B	US Rap	Album
"Diva's Gettin' Money" (featuring Beyoncé)	2009	—	—	—	Boss Bitch's World
"Overtime" (featuring Trina)	2010	—	—	—	Batteries Not Included
"Darling" (featuring Wiz Khalifa)	2012	—	—	—	—N/a
"Dark Red Lipstick" (featuring Azealia Banks)	2012	—	—	—	Lipstick & Pistols
"Don't Wake Me"	2012	—	—	—	Lipstick & Pistols
"B.B. (Boss Bitch)" (featuring Chevy Woods & Juicy J)	2013	—	—	—	—N/a
"Band Up"	2013	—	—	—	Lipstick & Pistols
"—" denotes a recording that did not chart or was not released in that territory.

=== Guest appearances ===
List of non-single guest appearances, with other performing artists, showing year released and album name
Title	Year	Other artist(s)	Album
"Get Ya Haters Up"	2010	King Los	Shooter
"King Los"	2011	King Los	The Crown Aint Safe
"Balance Is Good"	2015	King Los	God, Money, War
"Shine"	2012	Chevy Woods, Wiz Khalifa	Gang Land
"Transit"	2012	Chevy Woods	Gang Land
"The Code"	2012	Wiz Khalifa	Taylor Allderdice
"Lick It (U Nasty)"	2012	Kid Ink	Up & Away
"Bonnie & Clyde/Louis Gucci Fendi"	2012	Los	2010
"Rain"	2012	Dew Baby	Dew Jack City
"Actin Up" (Remix)	2012	Trina, 3D Na'Tee	—N/a
"Like Mine"	2012	Berner, Wiz Khalifa	Urban Farmer
"Initiation"	2012	Wiz Khalifa	O.N.I.F.C.
"All Gold All Girls" (Remix)	2013	Cassie, Trina	—N/a
"But You Playin"	2014	Los, Mario	Zero Gravity II
"Thug Love"	2015	Kevin McCall, Constantine	RnG Muzic

== Filmography ==
Year	Film	Role	Notes
2009	Before I Self Destruct	Mona	Direct-to-video DVD
2010	Crazy Like a Fox	Angelique Dubois	Direct-to-video DVD
2010	Video Girl	Jessica	Full-length film
2017	The Platinum Life	Herself	Main cast
