= Robin Schulz discography =

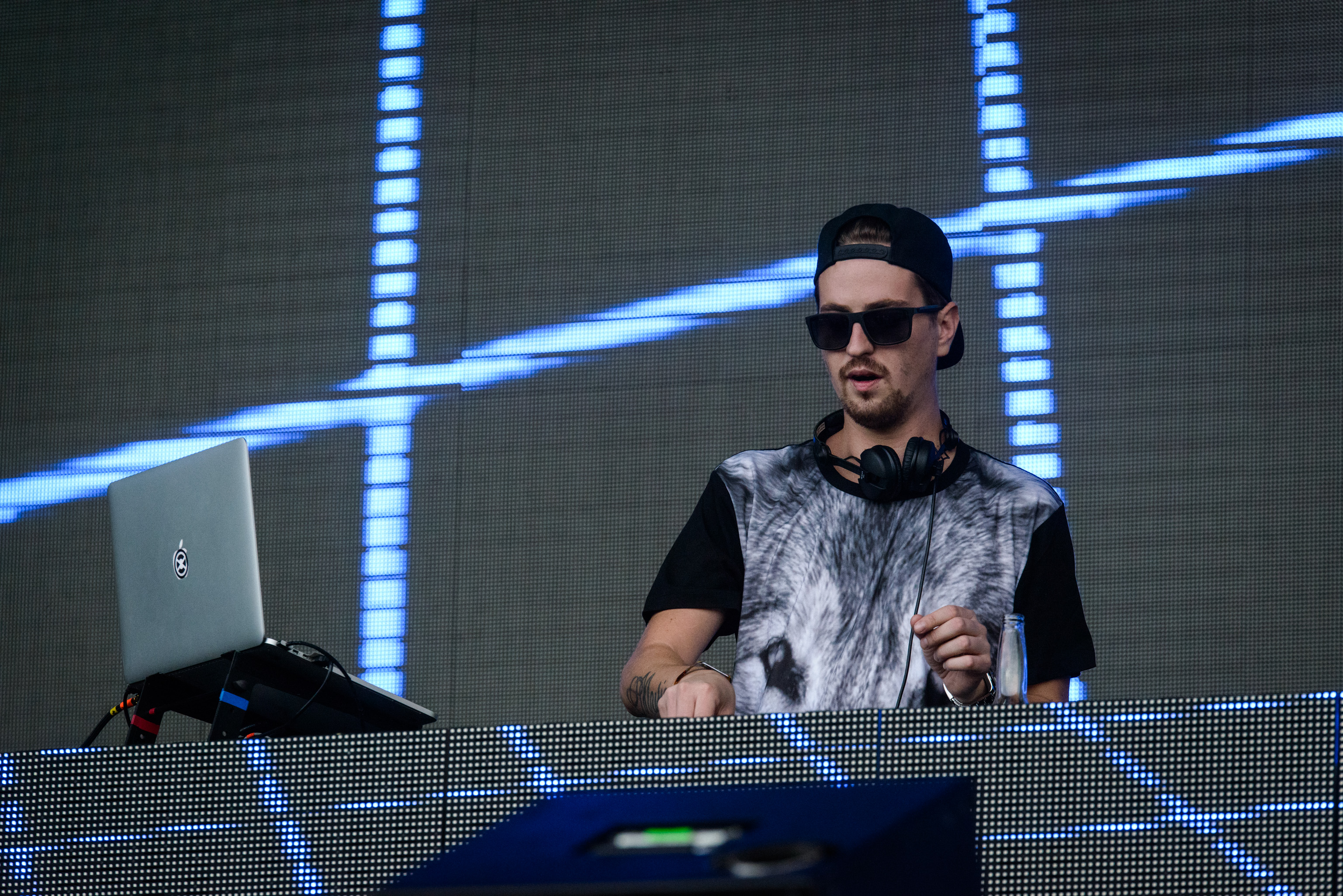
- Schulz performing in 2015
- Studio albums: 5
- Singles: 41
- Promotional singles: 1
- DJ mixes: 2

German DJ Robin Schulz has released five studio albums, two DJ mixes, 41 singles and one promotional single. Schulz achieved his worldwide breakthrough with his remix of Mr. Probz's "Waves" (2014), which reached the top ten of the charts in over ten countries, while further peaking within the top ten in various other. It was also certified—among others—Platinum in both the United Kingdom and the United States. While the disc jockey's follow-up recording, "Prayer in C" (2014), was met with similar commercial acclaim, two fellow singles from his debut studio album Prayer (2015) were released, including a collaboration with Jasmine Thompson.

Sugar (2015), Schulz's second record, received a Gold certification in Germany and was, like Prayer, moderately successful on charts. Sugar incorporated various featurings; "Headlights" and "Sugar" with Ilsey and Francesco Yates, respectively, went on to become chart successes in Europe, with the latter one achieving a Gold certification delivered by United States' RIAA.

== Studio albums ==
List of studio albums, with selected chart positions and certifications, showing details
Title	Album details	Peak chart positions										Certifications
Title	Album details	GER	AUS	AUT	BEL (FL)	DEN	ITA	NOR	SWE	SWI	US	Certifications
Prayer	Released: 19 September 2014; Label: Tonspiel, Warner; Format: CD, LP, digital download	7	37	10	42	30	98	20	18	4	42	BVMI: Platinum; BPI: Platinum; IFPI DEN: Gold; IFPI NOR: Gold; IFPI SWI: Gold
Sugar	Released: 25 September 2015; Label: Tonspiel, Warner; Format: CD, LP, digital download	3	31	4	23	30	22	10	19	1	154	BVMI: Gold; IFPI DEN: Gold
Uncovered	Released: 29 September 2017; Label: Tonspiel, Warner; Format: CD, LP, digital download	11	—	19	92	—	84	37	—	12	—	
IIII	Released: 26 February 2021; Label: Tonspiel, Warner; Format: CD, LP, digital download	9	—	29	47	—	—	11	—	9	—	
Pink	Released: 25 August 2023; Label: Tonspiel, Warner; Format: CD, LP, digital download	27	—	66	—	—	—	—	—	58	—	
"—" denotes a recording that did not chart or was not released.

== DJ mixes ==
List of DJ mixes
Title	Details
In the Mix #1	Released: 24 July 2020; Formats: Digital download
Tomorrowland Around the World 2020: Robin Schulz	Released: 5 August 2020; Formats: Digital download

== Singles ==
=== As lead artist ===
List of singles, with selected chart positions and certifications
Title	Year	Peak chart positions										Certifications	Album
Title	Year	GER	AUS	AUT	BEL (WA)	DEN	FRA	ITA	SWI	UK	US	Certifications	Album
"Rain"	2012	—	—	—	—	—	—	—	—	—	—		Non-album singles
"Feeling"	2012	—	—	—	—	—	—	—	—	—	—		Non-album singles
"To You"	2012	—	—	—	—	—	—	—	—	—	—		Non-album singles
"Stone"	2013	—	—	—	—	—	—	—	—	—	—		Non-album singles
"Same"	2013	—	—	—	—	—	—	—	—	—	—		Non-album singles
"Waves" (Mr. Probz; Robin Schulz remix)	2014	1	3	1	2	3	3	2	1	1	14	BVMI: Diamond; ARIA: 4× Platinum; BEA: Platinum; BPI: 3× Platinum; FIMI: 4× Platinum; IFPI AUT: Gold; IFPI DEN: 4× Platinum; IFPI SWI: Platinum; RIAA: 2× Platinum	Prayer
"Prayer in C" (Remix) (with Lilly Wood and the Prick)	2014	1	7	1	1	1	1	1	1	1	23	BVMI: Diamond; ARIA: 5× Platinum; BEA: Platinum; BPI: 3× Platinum; FIMI: 5× Platinum; IFPI AUT: Platinum; IFPI DEN: 2× Platinum; IFPI NOR: 4× Platinum; IFPI SWI: 3× Platinum; RIAA: Platinum; SNEP: Platinum	Prayer
"Willst Du" (with Alligatoah)	2014	35	—	42	—	—	—	—	47	—	—		Prayer
"Sun Goes Down" (featuring Jasmine Thompson)	2014	2	7	3	8	—	15	62	3	94	—	BVMI: 3× Gold; ARIA: Platinum; BPI: Silver; FIMI: Gold; IFPI AUT: Gold; IFPI NOR: Platinum; IFPI SWI: Platinum	Prayer
"Headlights" (featuring Ilsey)	2015	6	2	2	14	37	30	17	7	96	—	BVMI: 3× Gold; ARIA: Platinum; BPI: Silver; FIMI: 2× Platinum; IFPI AUT: Gold; IFPI DEN: Gold; IFPI NOR: 2× Platinum; IFPI SWI: Gold	Sugar
"Sugar" (featuring Francesco Yates)	2015	1	3	1	3	22	2	3	1	21	44	BVMI: Diamond; ARIA: 6× Platinum; BEA: Platinum; BPI: 2× Platinum; FIMI: 5× Platinum; IFPI AUT: Platinum; IFPI NOR: Platinum; IFPI SWI: 2× Platinum; RIAA: Platinum; SNEP: Gold	Sugar
"Show Me Love" (with J.U.D.G.E.)	2015	2	—	4	44	—	—	—	12	—	—	BVMI: Platinum; FIMI: Gold; IFPI AUT: Gold; IFPI SWI: Gold	Sugar
"Heatwave" (featuring Akon)	2016	30	—	24	—	—	—	—	—	—	—	BVMI: Gold; FIMI: Gold	Sugar
"Shed a Light" (with David Guetta featuring Cheat Codes)	2016	6	23	7	26	35	44	27	19	24	—	BVMI: Platinum; ARIA: 2× Platinum; BPI: Gold; FIMI: 2× Platinum; IFPI AUT: Gold; IFPI DEN: Gold; SNEP: Gold	Uncovered
"OK" (featuring James Blunt)	2017	2	—	2	17	—	8	24	2	62	—	BVMI: 2× Platinum; BEA: Platinum; BPI: Silver; FIMI: 3× Platinum; IFPI AUT: 2× Platinum; IFPI SWI: 2× Platinum; SNEP: Platinum	Uncovered
"I Believe I'm Fine" (with Hugel)	2017	29	—	26	—	—	—	—	88	—	—	BVMI: Gold	Uncovered
"Unforgettable" (with Marc Scibilia)	2017	13	—	31	—	—	—	—	61	—	—	BVMI: Gold; IFPI AUT: Gold	Uncovered
"Oh Child" (with Piso 21)	2018	19	—	20	—	—	—	—	84	—	—	BVMI: Gold; IFPI AUT: Gold	Uncovered
"Right Now" (vs. Nick Jonas)	2018	78	—	—	—	—	—	—	72	—	—		Non-album single
"Speechless" (featuring Erika Sirola)	2018	7	—	8	19	—	32	68	9	—	—	ARIA: Gold; BVMI: Platinum; BEA: Gold; FIMI: Platinum; IFPI AUT: Platinum; IFPI SWI: Platinum; SNEP: Platinum	IIII
"All This Love" (featuring Harlœ)	2019	24	—	32	—	—	—	—	28	—	—	BVMI: Gold; IFPI AUT: Gold	IIII
"Rather Be Alone" (with Nick Martin and Sam Martin)	2019	—	—	—	—	—	—	—	—	—	—		IIII
"In Your Eyes" (featuring Alida)	2020	5	—	3	5	—	52	—	5	—	—	ARIA: Gold; BVMI: 3× Gold; BEA: Platinum; FIMI: Gold; IFPI AUT: 2× Platinum; SNEP: Platinum	IIII
"Oxygen" (with Winona Oak)	2020	—	—	—	—	—	—	—	81	—	—		Non-album single
"Alane" (with Wes)	2020	6	—	3	5	—	15	—	7	—	—	BVMI: Gold; BEA: Gold; IFPI AUT: Platinum; SNEP: Gold	IIII
"All We Got" (featuring Kiddo)	2020	5	—	4	10	—	19	46	4	—	—	BVMI: Platinum; BEA: Gold; FIMI: Platinum; IFPI AUT: Platinum	IIII
"One More Time" (with Felix Jaehn featuring Alida)	2021	37	—	49	—	—	190	—	68	—	—		IIII and Breathe
"Somewhere Over the Rainbow/What a Wonderful World" (with Alle Farben and Israel Kamakawiwoʻole)	2021	82	—	—	48	—	—	—	—	—	—		Pink
"I Got a Feeling" (with Felix Jaehn featuring Georgia Ku)	2021	—	—	—	—	—	—	—	—	—	—		Breathe
"Young Right Now" (with Dennis Lloyd)	2021	28	—	32	—	—	80	—	17	—	—	BVMI: Gold; IFPI AUT: Platinum; SNEP: Gold	Pink
"In Your Arms (For an Angel)" (with Topic, Nico Santos and Paul Van Dyk)	2022	36	—	—	—	—	—	—	61	—	—	IFPI AUT: Gold	Non-album single
"On Repeat" (with David Guetta)	2022	—	—	—	—	—	—	—	—	—	—		Pink
"Sun Will Shine" (with Tom Walker)	2022	—	—	—	—	—	—	—	—	79	—		Pink
"Miss You" (with Oliver Tree)	2022	12	4	10	28	25	23	25	9	3	84	ARIA: 2× Platinum; BPI: Platinum; IFPI AUT: Platinum; RIAA: Platinum; SNEP: Gold	Alone in a Crowd
"Rockstar Baby" (featuring Mougleta)	2022	—	—	—	—	—	—	—	—	—	—		Non-album single
"Sweet Goodbye"	2023	—	—	—	—	—	—	—	—	—	—		Pink
"Smash My Heart"	2023	—	—	—	—	—	—	—	—	—	—		Pink
"Atlantis" (featuring Koppy)	2023	—	—	—	—	—	—	—	—	—	—		Non-album single
"One with the Wolves"	2023	—	—	—	—	—	—	—	—	—	—		Pink
"I'll Be There" (with Rita Ora and Tiago PZK)	2023	52	—	—	—	—	—	—	—	—	—		Non-album singles
"One by One" (with Topic featuring Oaks)	2024	—	—	—	—	—	—	—	—	—	—		Non-album singles
"All the Things She Said" (with Timmy Trumpet and Koppy)	2024	—	—	—	—	—	—	—	—	—	—		Non-album singles
"Upside Down" (with Joel Corry and Koppy)	2024	—	—	—	—	—	—	—	—	—	—		Non-album singles
"World Gone Wild" (with Cyril featuring Sam Martin)	2024	—	—	—	—	—	—	—	—	—	—		Non-album singles
"Million Good Reasons" (with Fast Boy)	2025	—	—	—	—	—	—	—	—	—	—		Non-album singles
"Freaking You Out" (with Nervo and Koppy)	2025	—	—	—	—	—	—	—	—	—	—		Non-album singles
"Old Friend" (featuring Cloves)	2025	—	—	—	—	—	—	—	—	—	—		Non-album singles
"Bloodtype" (with Steve Aoki and Lawrent)	2025	—	—	—	—	—	—	—	—	—	—		Non-album singles
"AM to PM" (with Sigala featuring Zoe Wees)	2025	—	—	—	—	—	—	—	—	—	—		The Collection
"Embers"	2026	—	—	—	—	—	—	—	—	—	—		Non-album singles
"Flames" (with Bandit)	2026	—	—	—	—	—	—	—	—	—	—		Non-album singles
"Better Times" (featuring Barbz)	2026	—	—	—	—	—	—	—	—	—	—		Non-album singles
"Arizona" (with Marten Hørger)	2026	—	—	—	—	—	—	—	—	—	—		Non-album singles
"Take It Slow (Bullit)" (with Watermät)	2026	—	—	—	—	—	—	—	—	—	—		Non-album singles
"—" denotes a recording that did not chart or was not released in that territory.

=== Promotional singles ===
List of promotional singles, with selected chart positions
Title	Year	Peak chart positions			Album
Title	Year	GER	FRA	SWI	Album
"Yellow" (with Disciples)	2015	73	117	70	Sugar

== Remixes ==
List of other remixes
Title	Year	Original artist(s)	Album
"Rather Be" (Robin Schulz Edit)	2014	Clean Bandit featuring Jess Glynne	Prayer
"No Rest for the Wicked" (Robin Schulz Remix)	2014	Lykke Li	Prayer
"Hier Mit Dir" (Robin Schulz Remix)	2014	Tom Thaler & Basil	Prayer
"A Sky Full of Stars" (Robin Schulz Edit)	2014	Coldplay	Prayer
"Dangerous" (Robin Schulz Remix)	2014	David Guetta featuring Sam Martin	Listen and Dangerous - Remixes EP
"Something New" (Robin Schulz Remix)	2015	Axwell Λ Ingrosso	Non-album remix
"Lay It All on Me" (Robin Schulz Remix)	2015	Rudimental featuring Ed Sheeran	Lay It All on Me (The Remixes)
"Bang My Head" (Robin Schulz Remix)	2015	David Guetta featuring Sia and Fetty Wap	Bang My Head - Remixes EP
"I Was Wrong" (Robin Schulz Remix)	2016	A R I Z O N A	Non-album remixes
"2U" (Robin Schulz Remix)	2017	David Guetta featuring Justin Bieber	Non-album remixes
"Complicated" (Robin Schulz Remix)	2017	Dimitri Vegas & Like Mike and David Guetta featuring Kiiara	Complicated (The Remixes)
"Perfect" (Robin Schulz Remix)	2017	Ed Sheeran	Non-album remixes
"Chasing Fire" (Robin Schulz Remix)	2018	Lauv	Non-album remixes
"Flames" (Robin Schulz Remix)	2018	David Guetta and Sia	Non-album remixes
"I'm a Mess" (Robin Schulz Remix)	2018	Bebe Rexha	Non-album remixes
"Let Me Go" (Robin Schulz Remix)	2019	Emin	Non-album remixes
"Giant" (Robin Schulz Remix)	2019	Calvin Harris and Rag'n'Bone Man	Non-album remixes
"Prayer in C" (5th Anniversary Remix)	2019	Lily Wood & The Prick	Non-album remixes
"Hola Señorita" (Robin Schulz Remix)	2019	Maitre Gims and Maluma	Non-album remixes
"Monster" (Robin Schulz Remix)	2019	Lum!x and Gabry Ponte	Non-album remixes
"Let's Love" (Robin Schulz Remix)	2020	David Guetta and Sia	Non-album remixes
"Head Shoulders Knees & Toes" (Robin Schulz Remix)	2020	Ofenbach and Quarterhead featuring Norma Jean Martine	Non-album remixes
"Do It Like Me" (Robin Schulz Remix)	2021	Chico Rose featuring B-Case	Non-album remixes
"Coming Down" (Robin Schulz Remix)	2021	Wave Wave featuring Marigo Bay	Non-album remixes
"Love Tonight" (Robin Schulz Remix)	2021	Shouse	Non-album remixes
"The Motto" (Robin Schulz Remix)	2022	Tiësto and Ava Max	Non-album remixes
"Greatest Day" (Robin Schulz rework)	2023	Take That featuring Calum Scott	TBA
"Последняя любовь" (Robin Schulz Remix)	2024	Morgenshtern	Non-album remix
