= Alex Schulz =

German DJ and record producer

- Born: Alex Schulz; 1993 (age 32–33); Stuttgart, Baden-Württemberg, Germany
- Genres: Deep house; melodic house; tropical house
- Occupations: DJ; record producer
- Instruments: Digital audio workstation; piano
- Label: TONSPIEL

Alex Schulz (German pronunciation: [ˈaːlɛks ˈʃʊlts]; born 1993) is a German DJ and record producer based in Stuttgart. He gained recognition for his song "In the Morning Light" which featured on Robin Schulz's album Prayer. The song gained over 10 million plays on music-streaming website Spotify.

== Biography ==
Schulz started playing the piano at the age of five. He became interested in electronic music at the age of fourteen. However, he started his production career at a later age.

Schulz remixed several songs including "Love Me Better" by Love Thy Brother, "Waves" by Dotan, "Headlights" by Robin Schulz and "Heartbeat" by Autograf, which featured on Tiësto's AFTR-HRS compilation album. He released a free song titled "Please Don't Say You Love Me" and singles titled "The Girl From Paris", "Middle" with producer Kiso, "U & I" and "Dirty Secret".

== Discography ==
=== Charted singles ===
Title	Year	Peak chart positions	Album
Title	Year	AUS	Album
"In the Morning Light"	2015	120	Prayer

=== Other singles ===
Title	Year
"Ways"	2015
"Middle" (with Kiso featuring Kayla Diamond)	2016
"Real You" (featuring A -SHO)	2016
"Be My Lover" (with Sam Feldt)	2017

=== Remixes ===
2014

- Phil Collins – Another Day in Paradise (Felix Jaehn and Alex Schulz Remix)
- Alex Schulz & Felix Jaehn – Dare (Alex Schulz Remix)

2015

- Dotan – Waves (Alex Schulz Remix)
- Robin Schulz – Headlights (Alex Schulz Remix)
- Thomas Jack – Rivers (Alex Schulz Remix)
- Phil Collins – Another Day In Paradise (Felix Jaehn and Alex Schulz Remix)
- Hollow Coves – The Woods (Alex Schulz Remix)
- Feder – Goodbye (Alex Schulz Remix)

2016

- Zara Larsson and MNEK – Never Forget You (Alex Schulz Remix)
- The New Coast – Lost In Your Love (Alex Schulz Remix)
- Clean Bandit featuring Jess Glynne – Real Love (Alex Schulz Remix)
- Major Lazer featuring Wild Belle – Be Together (Alex Schulz Remix)
- Kiso featuring Kayla Diamond – So Long (Alex Schulz Remix)
- OneRepublic – If I Lose Myself (Alex Schulz Remix)
- LOVETHYBROTHER – Love Me Better (Alex Schulz Remix)
- Moguai – Hold On (Alex Schulz Remix)
- Meadowlark – Fire (Alex Schulz Remix)
- MAX MANIE – Laura (Alex Schulz Remix)

2017

- Leo Stannard and Frances – Gravity (Alex Schulz Remix)
- A R I Z O N A – Oceans Away (Alex Schulz Remix)
- Lana Del Rey – Born To Die (Alex Schulz Remix)
- The Chainsmokers – Paris (Alex Schulz & Jona Selle Remix)
