= Love Me Better (disambiguation) =

Love Me Better is a 2017 song by James Blunt.

Love Me Better may also refer to:

- "Love Me Better", song by Alex Schulz from Love Thy Brother
- "Love Me Better", song by Sharon Corr from Dream of You
- "Love Me Better", song by Trey Songz from Passion, Pain & Pleasure
- "Love Me Better", song by The Pleasers
