= Unforgettable (Robin Schulz and Marc Scibilia song) =

Single by Robin Schulz & Marc Scibilia

from the album Uncovered
- Released: 22 December 2017
- Length: 3:45
- Label: Tonspiel; Warner
- Songwriter(s): Dennis Bierbrodt; Jürgen Dohr; Guido Kramer; Stefan Dabruck; Nolan Sipe; Robin Schulz; Marc Scibilia
- Producer(s): Junkx; Robin Schulz; Marc Scibilia

Robin Schulz singles chronology
"I Believe I'm Fine" (2017)	"Unforgettable" (2017)	"Oh Child" (2018)

"Unforgettable" is a song by German DJ and record producer Robin Schulz and American singer-songwriter Marc Scibilia. The song was released on 22 December 2017 as the fourth single from his third studio album, Uncovered (2017). The song was written by Dennis Bierbrodt, Jürgen Dohr, Guido Kramer, Stefan Dabruck, Nolan Sipe, Robin Schulz and Marc Scibilia.

== Background ==
Talking to Billboard about the song, Schulz said, "'Unforgettable' is one of my favorite tracks on my third album Uncovered because of the way it builds up. It's very intense but also danceable, and Marc Scibilia's voice adds very well to the atmosphere of the song. I hope people will like it as much as I do!"

== Music video ==
The official music video of the song was released on 19 January 2018 through Robin Schulz's YouTube account. The music video was directed by Maxim Rosenbauer and Moritz Ross.

== Track listing ==
Digital download – Stadiumx Remix
No.	Title	Length
1.	"Unforgettable" (Stadiumx Remix)	3:38

Digital download – The Remixes
No.	Title	Length
1.	"Unforgettable" (Alle Farben Remix)	3:26
2.	"Unforgettable" (Alle Farben Remix) (Extended Version)	5:22
3.	"Unforgettable" (Kryder Remix)	5:17
4.	"Unforgettable" (Plastik Funk Remix)	4:41
5.	"Unforgettable" (Smash Remix)	3:21
6.	"Unforgettable" (Lokee Remix)	4:57
7.	"Unforgettable" (Radio Edit)	3:27

== Charts ==
=== Weekly charts ===
Chart (2018)	Peak position
Austria (Ö3 Austria Top 40)	31
Belgium (Ultratip Bubbling Under Wallonia)	37
Germany (GfK)	13
Hungary (Rádiós Top 40)	1
Hungary (Single Top 40)	9
Switzerland (Schweizer Hitparade)	61

=== Year-end charts ===
Chart (2018)	Position
Germany (Official German Charts)	60
Hungary (Rádiós Top 40)	22
Hungary (Single Top 40)	55
Chart (2019)	Position
Hungary (Rádiós Top 40)	21

== Certifications ==
Region	Certification	Certified units/sales
Austria (IFPI Austria)	Gold	15,000^{‡}
Germany (BVMI)	Gold	200,000^{‡}
^{‡} Sales+streaming figures based on certification alone.
