= Alligatoah =

German musician (born 1989)

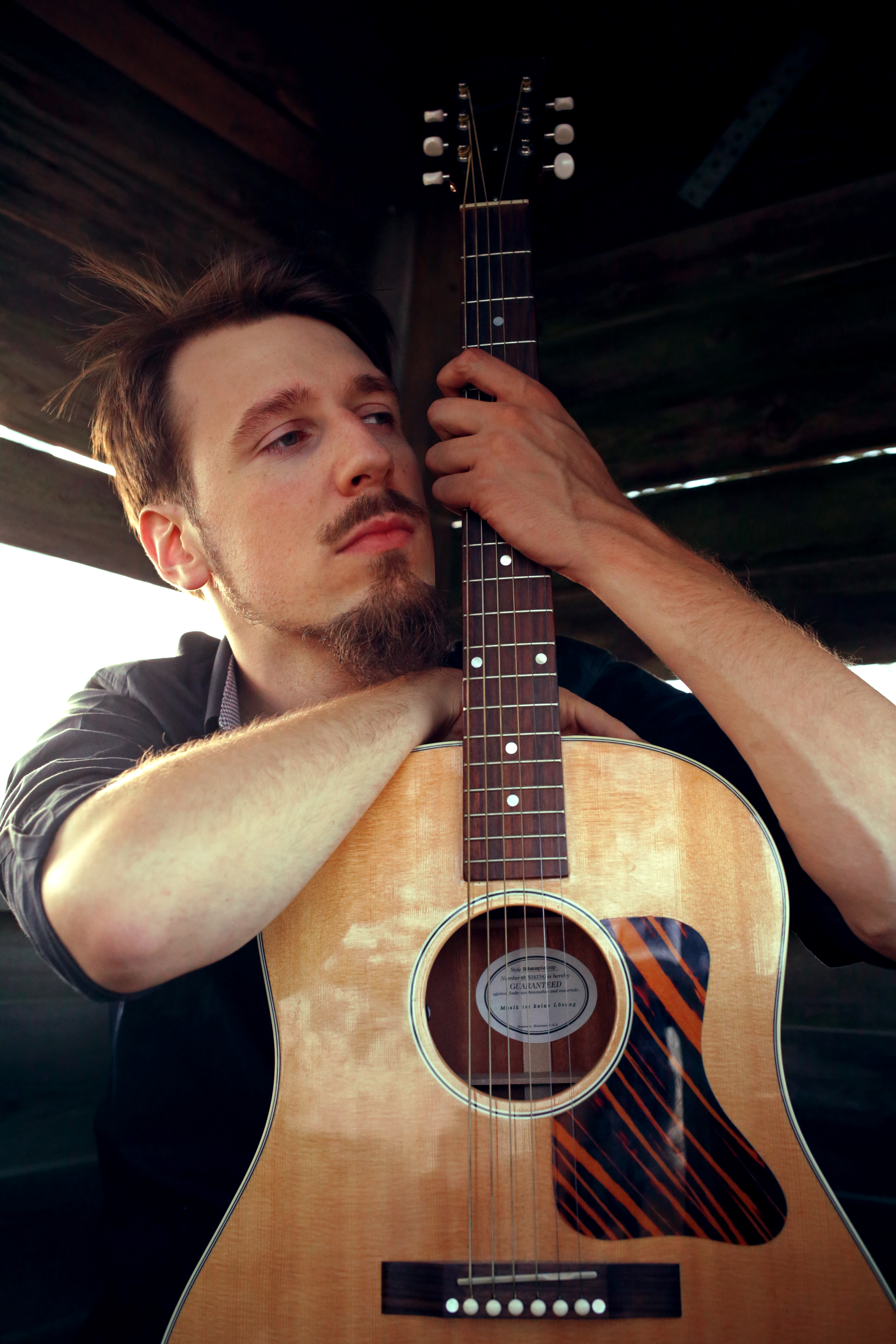
- Alligatoah in 2015

Background information
- Born: Lukas Strobel; 28 September 1989 (age 36)
- Origin: Langen, Cuxhaven, Lower Saxony, West Germany
- Genres: Hip hop; pop rap; rap rock; comedy hip hop; metal
- Occupations: Rapper, singer, DJ, producer
- Instruments: Vocals, guitar
- Years active: 2006–present
- Label: Trailerpark
- Website: alligatoah.de

Lukas Strobel (born 28 September 1989), better known by his stage name Alligatoah, is a German rapper, singer, producer and DJ signed to the independent German hip hop record label Trailerpark. He also publishes music for his two fictional characters Kaliba 69 (rapper) and DJ Deagle (producer) under his stage name. His albums Triebwerke and Musik ist keine Lösung were certified gold while the single "Willst du" was certified platinum.

== Biography ==
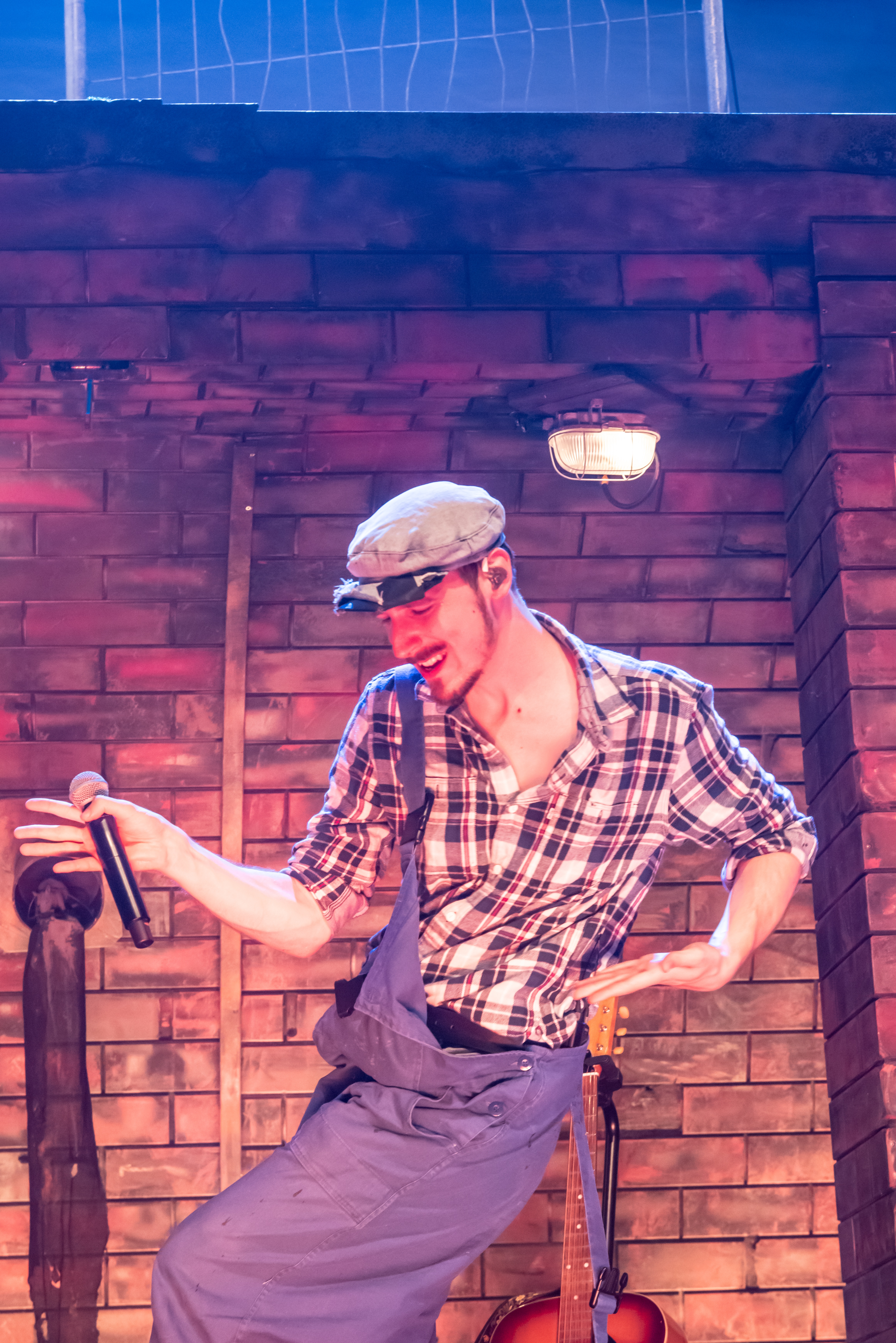
Alligatoah at the Zelt-Musik-Festival 2018 in Freiburg

Lukas Strobel grew up in Neuenwalde, a town near Bremerhaven in Lower Saxony. During his time at school he produced a number of short films and attended a film festival where he won 750 Euros for one of his films. Strobel continues to produce his videos. On 10 April 2006 Strobel founded the band Alligatoah and created two alter egos, to separate his function as a rapper (Kaliba 69) and as a producer (DJ Deagle). According to Strobel himself, another reason for the creation of the two characters is that he does not always "want to be alone" when making music. The greatest influence for his music was German battle rap like Aggro Berlin. In 2006 he released his first album ATTNTAAT and a mixtape called Schlaftabletten, Rotwein Teil I. Both albums, along with his music film Goldfieber, were downloadable for free. In 2007 he published the mixtape Schlaftabletten, Rotwein Teil II. In March 2008 he signed a contract with the German hip hop label rappers.in. Under this label he released the album In Gottes Namen, which was awarded the best demo of the month in the January/February issue of the German hip hop magazine Juice. For this issue Alligatoah produced an exclusive track. After successfully graduating from high school, Strobel moved to Berlin. In 2011 he released the third part of his mixtape named Schlaftabletten, Rotwein Teil III. In August of the same year he left rappers.in and joined the label Trailerpark after Timi Hendrix, a member of this label, recommended Alligatoah. From September 2011 until March 2012 he attended together with Pimpulsiv, Sudden and DNP the PeppNoseDay Tour in Germany.

In August 2013 Alligatoah released his third album Triebwerke, which debuted at number 1 on the German albums chart. The album received a gold certification in 2014 and the single "Willst du" reached platinum status. In September 2014 a remix of the song "Willst du" by the German DJ Robin Schulz was released and charted on the German iTunes singles chart just a few hours after its release. On 31 August 2015, Alligatoah announced his fourth album Musik ist keine Lösung, which was released on 27 November. On 3 December, Strobel won the award "1Live Krone 2015" for the best hip-hop act. In February 2016, Alligatoah embarked on his Himmelfahrtskommando tour and played in 11 German cities, as well as in Graz and Vienna. On 5 April his album Musik ist keine Lösung was certified gold.

== Discography ==
=== Albums ===
Title	Album details	Peak chart positions			Certifications
Title	Album details	GER	AUT	SWI	Certifications
Attntaat	Released: 11 August 2006; Label: Self-released; Format: Digital download	—	—	—	
In Gottes Namen	Released: 19 December 2008; Label: rappers.in; Format: CD, digital download	—	—	—	
Triebwerke	Released: 2 August 2013; Label: Trailerpark; Format: CD, 2×LP, digital download	1	3	27	BVMI: Platinum
Musik ist keine Lösung	Released: 27 November 2015; Label: Trailerpark; Format: CD, digital download	3	5	14	BVMI: Platinum
Schlaftabletten, Rotwein Teil V	Released: 14 September 2018; Label: Trailerpark; Format: CD, digital download	1	2	13	
Rotz & Wasser	Released: 25 March 2022; Label: Trailerpark; Format: Vinyl, digital download	2	4	18	
Off	Released: 22 March 2024; Label: Trailerpark; Format: CD, vinyl, digital download	1	1	3	

=== Mixtapes ===
- Schlaftabletten, Rotwein Teil I (2006)
- Schlaftabletten, Rotwein Teil II (2007)
- Schlaftabletten, Rotwein Teil III (2011)
- Schlaftabletten, Rotwein Teil IV (Collective works from 2008 to 2011)
- Schlaftabletten, Rottwein Teil V (2018)

=== EPs ===
- Goldfieber (Soundtracks) (2007)
- Raubkopierah (2008)
- Narben (2014)
- Nicht wecken (2019)
- Der gestichelte Kater (2025)

=== Singles ===
Title	Year	Peak chart positions			Certifications	Album	
Title	Year	GER	AUT	SWI	Certifications	Album	
"Trauerfeier Lied"	2013	69	—	—	BVMI: Gold	Triebwerke	
"Willst du"	2013	14	20	—	BVMI: Diamond	Triebwerke	
"Willst du (Robin Schulz Remix)"	2014	35	42	47		Prayer	
"Denk an die Kinder"	2015	38	—	—		Musik ist keine Lösung	
"Mein Gott hat den Längsten (Live)"	2016	—	—	—		In Gottes Namen	
"Alli-Alligatoah"	2018	85	—	—		Schlaftabletten, Rotwein Teil V	
"Wie Zuhause"	2018	—	—	—		Schlaftabletten, Rotwein Teil V	
"Meine Hoe"	2018	—	—	—		Schlaftabletten, Rotwein Teil V	
"Wo kann man das kaufen"	2018	—	—	—		Schlaftabletten, Rotwein Teil V	
"I Need A Face"	2018	—	—	—		Schlaftabletten, Rotwein Teil V	
"Nicht wecken (Heute)"	2019	83	—	—		Nicht wecken EP	
"Wie Zuhause (MTV Unplugged) (with Santiano)	2019	—	—	—		Non Album release	
"Lungenflügel"	2019	—	—	—		Schlaftabletten, Rotwein Teil V Zugabe	
"Beten & Beißen" (with Dazzle)	2020	—	—	—		Non Album release	
"Merch"	2020	—	—	—		Non Album release	
"Monet" (with Sido)	2020	9	29	74		Non Album release	
"Flugblätter" (with Lazy Lizzard Gang)	2020	—	—	—		Erde (by Lazy Lizzard Gang)	
"Keine bösen Wörter" (with FiNCH)	2021	83	—	—		Rummelbums (by FiNCH)	
"Mir dir schlafen"	2021	67	—	—		Rotz & Wasser	
"Nebenjob"	2021	44	—	—		Rotz & Wasser	
"Stay in Touch"	2021	71	—	—		Rotz & Wasser	
"Nachbeben"	2022	24	49	—		Rotz & Wasser	
"Nicht adoptiert"	2022	53	—			Rotz & Wasser	
"SO RAUS"	2023	—	—	—		off	—

=== Other charted songs ===
Title	Year	Peak chart positions	Certifications	Album
Title	Year	GER	Certifications	Album
"Vor Gericht"	2015	59		Musik ist keine Lösung
"Lass liegen"	2015	74		Musik ist keine Lösung
"Teamgeist"	2015	79		Musik ist keine Lösung
"Gute Bekannte"	2015	91		Musik ist keine Lösung
"Du bist schön"	2015	50	BVMI: Gold	Musik ist keine Lösung
"Musik ist keine Lösung"	2015	82		Musik ist keine Lösung
"Ein Problem mit Alkohol"	2018	92		Schlaftabletten, Rotwein V
"Beinebrechen" (featuring Felix Brummer)	2018	93		Schlaftabletten, Rotwein V

== Filmography ==
- Goldfieber (2007)

== Awards and certifications ==
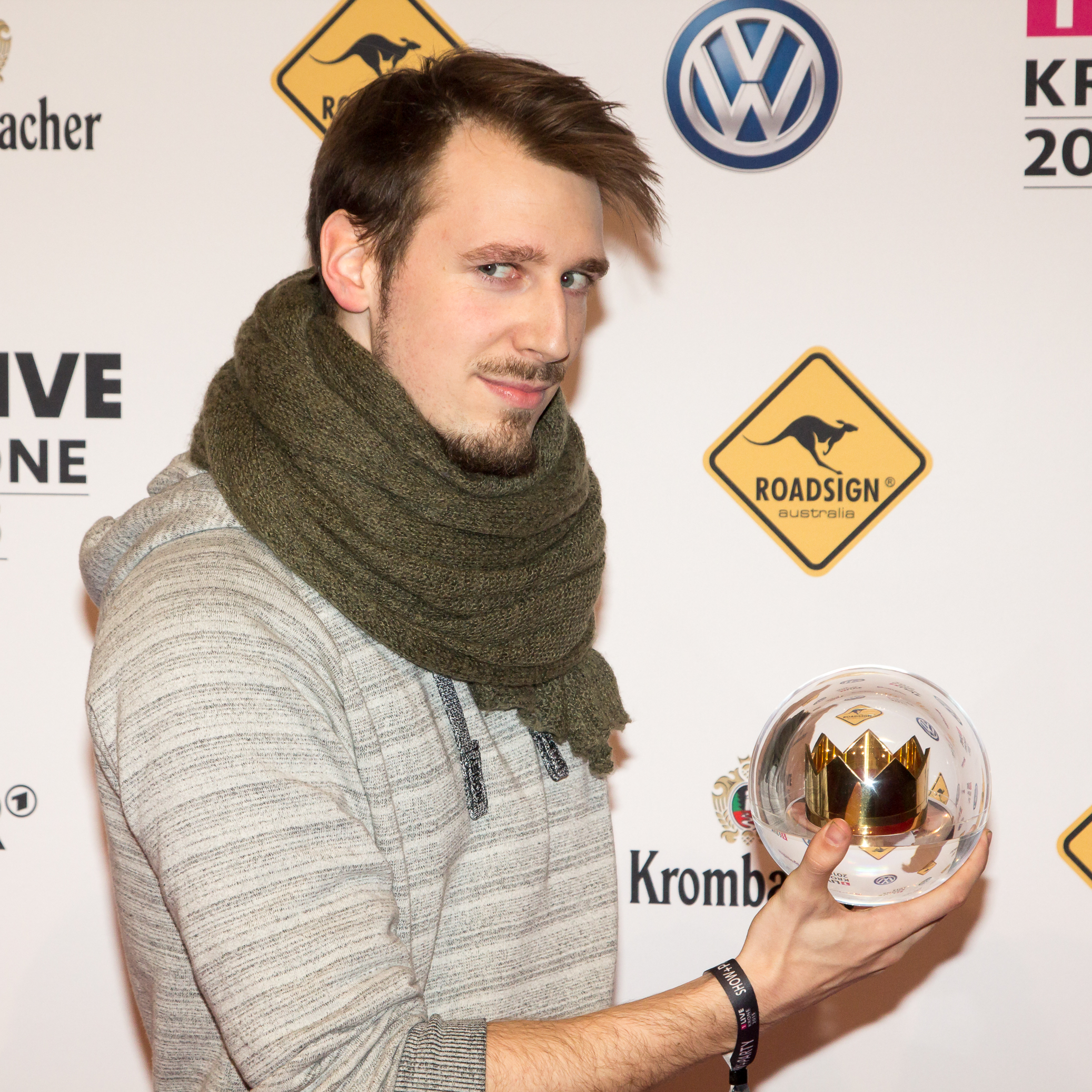
Alligatoah with the award 1LIVE Krone 2015

- 2015: German 1 Live Krone in the category Best Hip-Hop Act for the single "Vor Gericht"

Gold certification in Germany

- 2014: For the single "Willst du"
- 2014: For the album "Triebwerke"
- 2016: For the album "Musik ist keine Lösung"

Platinum certification in Germany

- 2015: For the single "Willst du"
