= Oh Child =

Single by Robin Schulz & Piso 21

from the album Uncovered
- Released: 22 June 2018
- Length: 3:14
- Label: Tonspiel; Warner
- Songwriters: Dennis Bierbrodt; Jürgen Dohr; Guido Kramer; Stefan Dabruck; Richard Boardman; Robin Schulz; Daniel Boyle; Pablo Bowman; Alejandro Patiño; David Escobar; Juan David Castaño; Juan David Huertas; Pablo Mejia
- Producers: Junkx; Richard Boardman; Robin Schulz; Daniel Boyle; Pablo Bowman

Robin Schulz singles chronology
"Unforgettable" (2017)	"Oh Child" (2018)	"Right Now" (2018)

"Oh Child" is a song by German DJ and record producer Robin Schulz and Colombian Latin pop group Piso 21. The song was released on 22 June 2018 as the fifth single from his third studio album, Uncovered (2017). The song was written by Dennis Bierbrodt, Jürgen Dohr, Guido Kramer, Stefan Dabruck, Richard Boardman, Robin Schulz, Daniel Boyle, Pablo Bowman, Alejandro Patiño, David Escobar, Juan David Castaño, Juan David Huertas and Pablo Mejia.

== Music video ==
The official music video of the song was released on 22 June 2018 through Robin Schulz's YouTube account.

== Track listing ==
Digital download and stream
No.	Title	Length
1.	"Oh Child"	3:14

Digital download – The Remixes
No.	Title	Length
1.	"Oh Child" (NERVO & ALIGEE Remix)	4:22
2.	"Oh Child" (Ashworth Remix)	2:43
3.	"Oh Child" (Me & My Monkey Remix)	5:51
4.	"Oh Child" (Mushroom People Remix)	3:10
5.	"Oh Child" (LOVRA Remix)	4:13
6.	"Oh Child" (Tocadisco Remix)	6:22

== Charts ==
=== Weekly charts ===
Chart (2018)	Peak position
Austria (Ö3 Austria Top 40)	20
Belgium (Ultratip Bubbling Under Wallonia)	22
Germany (GfK)	19
Hungary (Editors' Choice Top 40)	26
Switzerland (Schweizer Hitparade)	84
US Hot Dance/Electronic Songs (Billboard)	46

=== Year-end charts ===
Chart (2018)	Position
Germany (Official German Charts)	96

== Certifications ==
Region	Certification	Certified units/sales
Austria (IFPI Austria)	Gold	15,000^{‡}
Canada (Music Canada)	Gold	40,000^{‡}
Germany (BVMI)	Gold	200,000^{‡}
^{‡} Sales+streaming figures based on certification alone.
