= OK (Robin Schulz song) =

2017 single by Robin Schulz feat. James Blunt

Single by Robin Schulz featuring James Blunt

from the album Uncovered
- Released: 19 May 2017
- Genre: Deep house
- Length: 3:09
- Label: Tonspiel; Warner
- Songwriters: Robin Schulz; James Blunt; Steve Mac; MoZella
- Producer: Robin Schulz

Robin Schulz singles chronology
| "Shed a Light" (2016) | "OK" (2017) | "I Believe I'm Fine" (2017) |

James Blunt singles chronology
| "Bartender" (2017) | "OK" (2017) | "Melody" (2018) |

Music video
- "OK" on YouTube

"OK" is a song by German DJ and record producer Robin Schulz. The song was released on 19 May 2017 as the second single from his third studio album, Uncovered (2017). It features vocals by English singer-songwriter James Blunt.

== Background ==
The song was originally written by Blunt for his album The Afterlove but did not make the final cut. Blunt told Sodajerker, a podcast about songwriting, that the record company thought the song was a hit, but that he himself did not think he "nailed it" and refused to release it. Later he met his friend Schulz, who, to Blunt's surprise, had heard the unreleased song and had been "fucking with it". Blunt said that the DJ had "added the Robin Schulz magic", and admitted that the record company had been right about the song's potential.

The song was performed by Schulz for an audience of 8,500 fans at the König Pilsener Arena.

== Music video ==
The official music video of the song was released on 19 May 2017 through Robin Schulz's YouTube account. It was directed by Liza Minou Morberg and is an obvious homage to the film Eternal Sunshine of the Spotless Mind.

== Track listing ==
| No. | Title | Length |
|---|---|---|
| 1. | "OK" (featuring James Blunt) | 3:09 |

Maxi CD
| No. | Title | Length |
|---|---|---|
| 1. | "OK" (featuring James Blunt) | 3:09 |
| 2. | "OK" (featuring James Blunt; extended version) | 4:52 |
| 3. | "OK" (featuring James Blunt; Heyder remix) | 4:39 |
| 4. | "OK" (featuring James Blunt; Ofenbach remix) | 3:04 |
| 5. | "OK" (featuring James Blunt; Stadiumx remix) | 4:38 |
| 6. | "OK" (featuring James Blunt; Black Saint remix) | 5:45 |
| 7. | "OK" (featuring James Blunt; Sylvain Armand remix) | 3:00 |
| 8. | "OK" (featuring James Blunt; Blunty's Johnny Vix mix) | 3:16 |

== Charts ==
=== Weekly charts ===
| Chart (2017) | Peak position |
|---|---|
| Austria (Ö3 Austria Top 40) | 2 |
| Belarus Airplay (Eurofest) | 11 |
| Belgium (Ultratop 50 Flanders) | 16 |
| Belgium (Ultratop 50 Wallonia) | 17 |
| Czech Republic Airplay (ČNS IFPI) | 4 |
| Czech Republic Singles Digital (ČNS IFPI) | 22 |
| Finland (Suomen virallinen lista) | 7 |
| France (SNEP) | 8 |
| Germany (GfK) | 2 |
| Hungary (Dance Top 40) | 2 |
| Hungary (Rádiós Top 40) | 1 |
| Hungary (Single Top 40) | 3 |
| Hungary (Stream Top 40) | 3 |
| Ireland (IRMA) | 96 |
| Italy (FIMI) | 24 |
| Mexico Airplay (Billboard) | 48 |
| Netherlands (Dutch Top 40) | 23 |
| Netherlands (Single Top 100) | 35 |
| Norway (VG-lista) | 11 |
| Poland Airplay (ZPAV) | 1 |
| Poland Dance (ZPAV) | 4 |
| Portugal (AFP) | 71 |
| Russia Airplay (Tophit) | 20 |
| Scottish Singles Sales (Official Charts) | 62 |
| Slovakia Airplay (ČNS IFPI) | 6 |
| Slovakia Singles Digital (ČNS IFPI) | 20 |
| Slovenia Airplay (SloTop50) | 3 |
| Spain (Promusicae) | 9 |
| Sweden (Sverigetopplistan) | 10 |
| Switzerland (Schweizer Hitparade) | 2 |
| Ukraine Airplay (Tophit) | 1 |
| US Adult Pop Airplay (Billboard) | 33 |
| US Dance Club Songs (Billboard) | 1 |
| US Hot Dance/Electronic Songs (Billboard) | 25 |

=== Year-end charts ===
| Chart (2017) | Position |
|---|---|
| Austria (Ö3 Austria Top 40) | 7 |
| Belgium (Ultratop Flanders) | 59 |
| Belgium (Ultratop Wallonia) | 57 |
| France (SNEP) | 113 |
| Germany (Official German Charts) | 7 |
| Hungary (Dance Top 40) | 19 |
| Hungary (Rádiós Top 40) | 4 |
| Hungary (Single Top 40) | 7 |
| Hungary (Stream Top 40) | 7 |
| Italy (FIMI) | 46 |
| Latvia Airplay (LaIPA) | 23 |
| Poland Airplay (ZPAV) | 15 |
| Slovenia Airplay (SloTop50) | 22 |
| Spain Airplay (Promusicae) | 5 |
| Sweden (Sverigetopplistan) | 37 |
| Switzerland (Schweizer Hitparade) | 10 |
| US Dance Club Songs (Billboard) | 39 |
| US Hot Dance/Electronic Songs (Billboard) | 68 |

| Chart (2018) | Position |
|---|---|
| Hungary (Dance Top 40) | 27 |
| Hungary (Rádiós Top 40) | 5 |

== Certifications ==
| Region | Certification | Certified units/sales |
|---|---|---|
| Austria (IFPI Austria) | 2× Platinum | 60,000^{‡} |
| Belgium (BRMA) | Platinum | 20,000^{‡} |
| Canada (Music Canada) | Platinum | 80,000^{‡} |
| Denmark (IFPI Danmark) | Gold | 45,000^{‡} |
| France (SNEP) | Platinum | 133,333^{‡} |
| Germany (BVMI) | 2× Platinum | 800,000^{‡} |
| Italy (FIMI) | 3× Platinum | 150,000^{‡} |
| New Zealand (RMNZ) | Gold | 15,000^{‡} |
| Poland (ZPAV) | 2× Platinum | 100,000^{‡} |
| Portugal (AFP) | Gold | 5,000^{‡} |
| Spain (Promusicae) | Platinum | 40,000^{‡} |
| Switzerland (IFPI Switzerland) | 2× Platinum | 40,000^{‡} |
| United Kingdom (BPI) | Silver | 200,000^{‡} |
^{‡} Sales+streaming figures based on certification alone.
