= Heatwave (Robin Schulz song) =

Single by Robin Schulz featuring Akon

from the album Sugar
- Released: 12 February 2016
- Recorded: 2014–15
- Genre: House, pop
- Length: 3:07
- Label: Tonspiel (Warner Music Group)
- Songwriter(s): Thomas Troelsen; Aliaune Thiam; Bryan Nelson
- Producer(s): Robin Schulz

Robin Schulz singles chronology
"Show Me Love" (2015)	"Heatwave" (2016)	"Shed a Light" (2016)

Akon singles chronology
"Act Like You Know" (2015)	"Heatwave" (2016)	"I Am Somebody" (2016)

"Heatwave" is a song by German DJ and record producer Robin Schulz featuring vocals from American singer, rapper and songwriter Akon. The song was released as a digital download in Germany on 12 February 2016 as the fourth and final single from his second studio album Sugar (2015). The song was written by Thomas Troelsen, Aliaune Thiam and Bryan Nelson.

== Music video ==
The music video for this song was released onto YouTube on 7 April 2016 and runs for a total length of three minutes and twenty-six seconds.

== Track listing ==
Digital download
No.	Title	Length
1.	"Heatwave" (feat. Akon)	3:07

Digital download - Remixes
No.	Title	Length
1.	"Heatwave" (feat. Akon) (Extended Version)	5:25
2.	"Heatwave" (feat. Akon) (HUGEL Remix)	3:52
3.	"Heatwave" (feat. Akon) (Deepend Remix)	5:06
4.	"Heatwave" (feat. Akon) (Muzzaik Remix)	4:16
5.	"Heatwave" (feat. Akon) (Remady Remix)	3:46
6.	"Heatwave" (feat. Akon) (DJ Katch Remix)	3:20
7.	"Show Me Love" (Calvo Remix)	4:40

== Charts ==
=== Weekly charts ===
Weekly chart performance for "Heatwave"
Chart (2016)	Peak position
Austria (Ö3 Austria Top 40)	24
Germany (GfK)	30
Netherlands (Tipparade)	28
Slovenia (SloTop50)	27
Sweden (Sverigetopplistan)	29

=== Year-end charts ===
Year-end chart performance for "Heatwave"
Chart (2016)	Position
Germany (Official German Charts)	85

== Certifications ==
Certifications for "Heatwave"
Region	Certification	Certified units/sales
Canada (Music Canada)	Gold	40,000^{‡}
Germany (BVMI)	Gold	200,000^{‡}
Italy (FIMI)	Gold	25,000^{‡}
^{‡} Sales+streaming figures based on certification alone.

== Release history ==
Release dates for "Heatwave"
Region	Date	Format	Version	Label	Ref.
Germany	12 February 2016	Digital download; CD	Original	Tonspiel (Warner Music Group)	
Italy	6 May 2016	Contemporary hit radio	Original	Warner	
Germany	17 June 2016	Digital download	Remixes EP	Tonspiel (Warner Music Group)	
