= Better to Be Loved =

Single by Francesco Yates

from the album Francesco Yates EP
- Released: 2015
- Recorded: 2015
- Genre: Funk
- Length: 3:27
- Label: Warner Music
- Songwriter(s): Francesco Yates, Matt Morris, Robin Hannibal
- Producer(s): Robin Hannibal

Francesco Yates singles chronology
"When I Found You" (2014)	"Better to Be Loved" (2015)	"Nobody Like You" (2015)

Music video
- "Better to Be Loved" on YouTube

"Better to Be Loved" is a single by Canadian singer-songwriter Francesco Yates. It was released in 2015 as a single from his EP Francesco Yates.

== Charts ==
=== Weekly charts ===
Chart (2015)	Peak position
Canada (Canadian Hot 100)	37
Canada AC (Billboard)	6
Canada Hot AC (Billboard)	5
Canada CHR/Top 40 (Billboard)	9
France (SNEP)	196

=== Year-end charts ===
Chart (2015)	Position
Canada (Canadian Hot 100)	95
