= Uncovered (Robin Schulz album) =

Studio album by Robin Schulz
- Released: 8 September 2017
- Label: Tonspiel; Warner

Robin Schulz chronology
Sugar (2015)	Uncovered (2017)	IIII (2021)

Singles from Uncovered
- 1. "Shed a Light" Released: 25 November 2016; 2. "OK" Released: 19 May 2017; 3. "I Believe I'm Fine" Released: 8 September 2017; 4. "Unforgettable" Released: 22 December 2017; 5. "Oh Child" Released: 22 June 2018

Uncovered is the third studio album by German DJ and record producer Robin Schulz, it was released on 8 September 2017. The album includes the singles "Shed a Light", "OK", "I Believe I'm Fine", "Unforgettable" and "Oh Child". The album peaked at number eleven on the German Albums Chart.

== Singles ==
"Shed a Light" was released as the lead single from the album on 25 November 2016. The song peaked at number six on the German Singles Chart. "OK" was released as the second single from the album on 19 May 2017. The song peaked at number two on the German Singles Chart. "I Believe I'm Fine" was released as the third single from the album on 8 September 2017. The song peaked at number twenty-nine on the German Singles Chart. "Unforgettable" was released as the fourth single from the album on 22 December 2017. The song peaked at number thirteen on the German Singles Chart. "Oh Child" was released as the fifth single from the album on 22 June 2018. The song peaked at number nineteen on the German Singles Chart.

== Critical reception ==
Robert Wunsch of Billboard gave the album a positive review stating, "It's 18 tracks of mood-altering musical enjoyment, running the gamut of thoughtful pop, energetic dance, folksy tropical rhythms, and cool repose. It opens with a very cinematic 'Intro' that moves smooth into the melancholy chords of 'Unforgettable'. Fans will recognize the fun melody of single 'Shed A Light' featuring fellow pop-dance heroes David Guetta and Cheat Codes, and the easy flow keeps strong into the instantly-catchy 'Oh Child'. Uncovered is full of emotional vocal features, including a powerful performance from soulful up-and-comer IRO on 'Fools', and a big, bright sing-along from radio star James Blunt on 'Okay'".

== Track listing ==
No.	Title	Writer(s)	Producer(s)	Length
1.	"Intro"	Robin Schulz; Dennis Bierbrodt; Jurgen Dohr; Guido Kramer; Stefan Dabruck	Schulz; Junkx	2:06
2.	"Unforgettable" (with Marc Scibilia)	Schulz; Bierbrodt; Dohr; Kramer; Dabruck; Marc Scibilia; Nolan Sipe	Schulz; Junkx; Scibilia	3:45
3.	"Shed a Light" (with David Guetta featuring Cheat Codes)	Schulz; Bierbrodt; Dohr; Kramer; Dabruck; Pierre Guetta; Giorgio Tuinfort; Ammar Malik; John Ryan II; Jacob Kasher Hindlin; Jason Evigan	Schulz; Junkx; David Guetta; Trevor Dahl	3:11
4.	"Oh Child"	Schulz; Bierbrodt; Dohr; Kramer; Dabruck; Richard Boardman; Pablo Bowman; Daniel Boyle	Schulz; Junkx; The Six	3:17
5.	"Fools" (with Aalias featuring IRO)	Schulz; Bierbrodt; Dohr; Kramer; Dabruck; Coyle Girelli; Aaron Kleinstub; Ori Rakib	Schulz; Junkx; Aalias	3:06
6.	"Like You Mean It" (featuring Rhys)	Schulz; Bierbrodt; Dohr; Kramer; Dabruck; Julia Michaels; Justin Tranter; Mason "MdL" Levy	Schulz; Junkx; Jorgen Elofsson	3:33
7.	"OK" (featuring James Blunt)	Schulz; Bierbrodt; Dohr; Kramer; Dabruck; James Blunt; Maureen McDonald; Steve McCutcheon	Schulz; Junkx; Steve Mac	3:12
8.	"Naked" (featuring Sam Martin)	Schulz; Bierbrodt; Dohr; Kramer; Dabruck; Joaquin Banuelos; Samuel Martin; Malik; Evigan	Schulz; Junkx; Martin; Evigan	3:25
9.	"Above the Clouds"	Schulz; Bierbrodt; Dohr; Kramer; Dabruck	Schulz; Junkx	3:30
10.	"Higher Ground"	Schulz; Bierbrodt; Dohr; Kramer; Dabruck; John Newman; David Gibson	Schulz; Junkx; Newman^{[c]}	3:43
11.	"Love Me a Little"	Schulz; Bierbrodt; Dohr; Kramer; Dabruck; Iman Jordan; James Nosanow	Schulz; Junkx; Jimmy Harry	3:32
12.	"Tonight and Every Night"	Schulz; Bierbrodt; Dohr; Kramer; Dabruck; Thomas Lee James; Kyle Guisande; Devin Guisande	Schulz; Junkx	3:55
13.	"More than a Friend" (featuring Nico Santos)	Schulz; Bierbrodt; Dohr; Kramer; Dabruck; Nico Santos; Martin Gallop; Tabias Topic	Schulz; Junkx	3:12
14.	"I Believe I'm Fine" (with Hugel)	Schulz; Bierbrodt; Dohr; Kramer; Dabruck; Florent Hugel; Lindsay Lohan; Kara DioGuardi; Chriatopher Braide; Gibson	Schulz; Junkx; Hugel	3:47
15.	"Ha Leh Lou Ya" (featuring Christy McDonald)	Schulz; Bierbrodt; Dohr; Kramer; Dabruck; Christy McDonald; Daniel Radar; Nathan Chapman	Schulz; Junkx; Danny Radar; Chapman	3:38
16.	"Sounds Easy" (featuring Ruxley)	Schulz; Bierbrodt; Dohr; Kramer; Dabruck; Ivan Peroti; Timothy Boomsma; Dennis Baffoe; Rudy Mackaij	Schulz; Junkx; Boomsma; Baffoe	3:08
17.	"Un Sueno"	Schulz; Bierbrodt; Dohr; Kramer; Dabruck	Schulz; Junkx	4:18
18.	"Outro"	Schulz; Bierbrodt; Dohr; Kramer; Dabruck	Schulz; Junkx	2:26

== Charts ==
Chart (2017)	Peak position
Austrian Albums (Ö3 Austria)	19
Belgian Albums (Ultratop Flanders)	92
Belgian Albums (Ultratop Wallonia)	50
Canadian Albums (Billboard)	99
Czech Albums (ČNS IFPI)	23
Dutch Albums (Album Top 100)	89
Finnish Albums (Suomen virallinen lista)	13
French Albums (SNEP)	92
German Albums (Offizielle Top 100)	11
Italian Albums (FIMI)	84
Latvian Albums (LaIPA)	63
Norwegian Albums (VG-lista)	37
Slovak Albums (ČNS IFPI)	41
Spanish Albums (PROMUSICAE)	62
Swiss Albums (Schweizer Hitparade)	12
US Top Dance Albums (Billboard)	12

== Release history ==
Region	Date	Format	Label
Various	8 September 2017	Digital download	TONSPIEL; Warner
