= Marc Scibilia =

American singer-songwriter (born 1986)

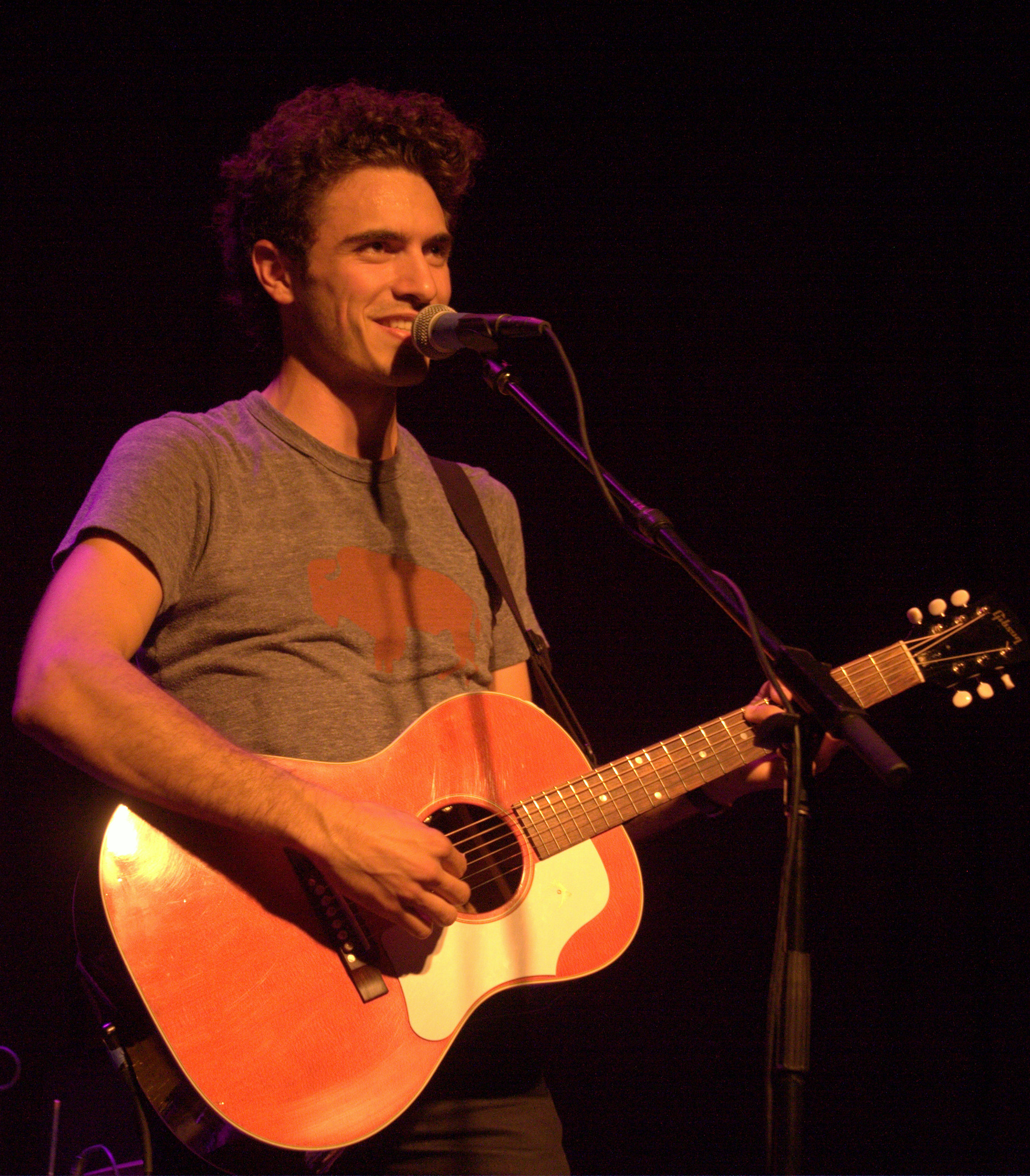
- Scibilia performing in 2013

Background information
- Born: Marc Anthony Scibilia; June 20, 1986 (age 40); Buffalo, New York
- Origin: East Nashville, Tennessee
- Genres: Pop rock; folk
- Occupations: Singer-songwriter; musician; producer
- Instruments: Vocals; guitar; bass guitar; piano; keyboards; drums; banjo
- Years active: 2004–present
- Labels: Good Lander Records; I.R.S.; Sony/ATV; Capitol
- Website: marcscibilia.com

Marc Anthony Scibilia (born June 20, 1986) is an American singer-songwriter and musician whose work is known as a blend of soul, folk, country, and anthemic pop music. His Gold-certified single "Unforgettable", which is a collaboration with German DJ Robin Schulz, garnered over 100 million streams and was a number 1 radio hit in Germany. Scibilia’s latest album, More to This, was recorded in his East Nashville studio, Good Lander Records, and includes a mix of original songs, covers, and mashups. The title track, "More to This", garnered over 10 million streams. After growing his social media followings, he went on his first sold-out headline fall tour in 2024, which included multiple nights in Chicago, Nashville, and New York City. Following the success of that tour, Scibilia headlined his first world tour in spring 2025.

His songs have been featured in television shows and movies such as Shrinking, Peter Rabbit, Bones, and About a Boy, and has been used in other media for companies such as Jeep, Chrysler, Samsung, and Water.org. In addition to his own music, Marc has been credited for songwriting and producing for other musical artists, including Teddy Swims, Keith Urban, Robin Schulz, Quinn XCII, Claptone, Ingrid Andress, Seal, Ben Rector, and Lennon Stella, among others.

== Early life ==
Scibilia was born on June 20, 1986, in Buffalo, New York. He is of Italian and Lebanese descent. By the time he was six, he started taking drum lessons and writing his own songs. In high school, he began classical piano training with Steve Parisi, and eventually picked up guitar. He grew up in a musical family, and his father, Robert, and grandfather, Antony, were professional musicians while pursuing other careers to support their families. Specifically, Antony had his own orchestra and played bass alongside famed guitarist Tommy Tedesco. Scibilia's brother, Matt, plays drums in his touring band and has played for artists such as Brendan Benson, Cory Chisel, and Colorfeels.

== Career ==
Scibilia moved to Nashville after high school wanting to become a musician. In 2007, he released his debut EP Fixity, followed by another EP, From Brooklyn To Maine, in 2009. In 2010, Scibilia signed with Sony ATV. In 2012, he released his self-titled EP, which included "How Bad We Need Each Other", a song that was featured on the FOX Network series Bones. The song also appeared in NBC's About a Boy. On October 30, 2015, Scibilia released his debut full-length eleven-song album Out Of Style.

Outside of his own records, he has written and produced songs for other musical artists. In 2014, he wrote and produced the song "Bright Lights" for American Idol contestant Paul McDonald. In 2016, Scibilia co-wrote the song "Focus" with Jacob Whitesides for his 2016 album Why?

Scibilia worked with Sony ATV's Brian Monaco on a cover of Woody Guthrie's song "This Land Is Your Land" that was included in the Jeep TV commercial "Beautiful Lands" for Super Bowl XLIX on February 1, 2015. The ad fared well, making Scibilia one of the most Shazam-ed artists of the telecast and led to mentions in several publications.

Scibilia has toured with James Bay, ZZ Ward, Butch Walker, Gavin James, Steve Winwood, Zac Brown Band, Ben Rector, Drew Holcomb and the Neighbors, Green River Ordinance, and Michael Franti, among others. He has also opened for the Wallflowers, John Oates (Hall & Oates) and Sixpence None the Richer. He played with Sixpence None the Richer and collaborated with Leigh Nash, the lead singer of the band, where they wrote the Christmas song "Deeper Than You Know".

In 2015, he performed at NFL Draft Town as part of the festivities surrounding the NFL Draft that year.

On December 5, 2016, Scibilia released a cover of John Lennon's "Happy Xmas (War Is Over)" with fellow Nashville-based musician Lennon Stella of the Canadian duo Lennon & Maisy.

On February 10, 2017, Scibilia released his single "Summer Clothes" independently through his label, Good Lander Records, and on March 6, he released the music video for the song via a premiere on Rolling Stone including dates for his first headline tour, The Summer Clothes Tour. His single, "On The Way", was included in his second Jeep commercial on TV where he was also featured performing the song on a beach live. The Summer of Jeep Campaign featured the summer line of Jeep vehicles and ran from May through September 2017.

Scibilia collaborated with Hungarian progressive house DJ producer duo Stadiumx on the song "Those Were the Days" released on July 14, 2017. Scibilia's next collaboration, with German musician, DJ and producer Robin Schulz produced the song "Unforgettable" released on September 29, 2017, as a part of Schulz's album Uncovered. "Unforgettable" has been certified Gold by the Federal Music Industry Association and reached the No. 1 position on the German radio airplay charts. Scibilia joined Schulz on select dates of his Germany arena tour in October 2017. On March 21, 2018, Scibilia joined Schulz at the WDM Radio Awards to perform "Unforgettable" in front of a record crowd of 90,000 attendees at Estadio Azteca in Mexico City.

In February 2018, Marc Scibilia's cover of the Clean Bandit song "Rather Be" appeared in the film Peter Rabbit starring Domhall Gleeson, Rose Byrne, James Corden, Margot Robbie, Daisy Ridley, and Sia, among others.

In November 2018, Scibilia released his first EP since his debut album, titled 7th & Christopher, which consists of four songs and is named after the cross streets in Manhattan, NY where he and his wife spent time that year.

Through 2019 and 2020, Scibilia released three different versions of his song "90's" including the original version of "90's", "90's (U.S. Version)" and "90's (Piano Version)" with different musical production on each version. This production exploration continued into songs like "Unforgettable (Acoustic)" based on his original version with DJ Robin Schulz and "You Are The Night (Acoustic)" which culminated in the 2020 EP Versions which contained these alternate versions of songs and one cover, "Dancing In The Dark" by Bruce Springsteen, which Scibilia had been heard playing live on previous tours.

In 2020, Scibilia also released "All Day All Night", a single which was featured in a Chrysler TV commercial and co-written with rapper and songwriter Gizzle and Grammy Award-winning songwriter David 'Swag R'Celious' Harris, and featured rapper Jim Jones and musician Phil Collen of Def Leppard. Scibilia featured in more songs with Jim Jones including "State of the Union" featuring rapper Rick Ross and ultimately contributied songwriting to several of the tracks on Jim Jones' album El Capo.

In March 2020, Samsung released their "Stay Apart, Stay Together" worldwide ad campaign promoting the use of their technology products to stay connected to family and friends while staying apart due to the global COVID-19 pandemic. Scibilia's 2010 demo of his song "How Bad We Need Each Other" was chosen as the song for the ad, and in April of that year, Scibilia released the 10-year old demo. Later that year, non-profit organization Water.org used the song for their new PSA campaign featuring co-founder and actor, Matt Damon.

In November 2020, Scibilia released his sophomore album, Seed of Joy, which featured contributions by Brian Fallon (The Gaslight Anthem), Cory Wong (Vulfpeck, Jon Batiste), Mike Sabbath (Lizzo, Jonas Brothers), Jake Sinclair (Panic! At The Disco, Beck), Nolan Sipe (Zac Brown Band, Dave Matthews Band), and Jon Nite (Keith Urban, Luke Bryant), and was mixed by Michael Brauer (The Rolling Stones, John Mayer, Coldplay). The album, mostly written by Scibilia whom also played most of the instruments and recorded it himself in his basement studio, centered around Scibilia's experiences earlier in 2020 when his father was diagnosed with terminal brain cancer and later died, while at the same time, he and his wife welcomed their first child.

By mid-2020, Scibilia began construction on his new backyard studio in East Nashville, Tennessee, called Good Lander Studios. The studio, named after his long-time dog, Lander, was completed by the end of the year and it is where Scibilia currently writes, records and produces all his music.

In 2021, Scibilia released a new single, "Rivals", followed by an acoustic single, "Wild World", which became bonus tracks along with two more acoustic singles, "This Dream" and "Already Miss You" on the deluxe edition of Seed of Joy which came out in April 2021.

In 2022, Scibilia collaborated on the single "Smile" with singer-songwriter Mat Kearney, and the two toured together in November across the mid-west of the US. The duo toured again in February 2023 across the east coast.

In June 2023, Scibilia released his third album Mindy.

In November 2024, Scibilia released his fourth album More To This.

In February 2025, Scibilia embarked on his first world headline tour, selling out venues across the globe, and the tour ran through May 2025.

== Discography ==
Studio albums

- Fixity (2007)
- From Brooklyn to Maine – EP (2009)
- Marc Scibilia – EP (2012)
- The Shape I'm In – EP (2013)
- Out of Style – EP (2015)
- Out of Style (2015)
- 7th & Christopher – EP (2018)
- Versions – EP (2020)
- Seed of Joy (2020)
- Mindy (2023)
- Synth Folk, Vol. 1 – EP (2023)
- More To This (2024)
