= I Believe I'm Fine =

Single by Robin Schulz and Hugel

from the album Uncovered
- Released: 8 September 2017
- Genre: Future bass • dance-pop
- Length: 3:47
- Label: Tonspiel; Warner
- Songwriters: Dennis Bierbrodt; Jürgen Dohr; Guido Kramer; Dave Gibson; Stefan Dabruck; Florent Hugel; Christopher Braide; Robin Schulz; Kara DioGuardi; Lindsay Lohan
- Producers: Junkx; Robin Schulz; Hugel

Robin Schulz singles chronology
"OK" (2017)	"I Believe I'm Fine" (2017)	"Unforgettable" (2017)

"I Believe I'm Fine" is a song by German DJ Robin Schulz and French DJ Hugel. The song was released on 8 September 2017 as the third single from his third studio album, Uncovered (2017). The song was written by Dennis Bierbrodt, Jürgen Dohr, Guido Kramer, Dave Gibson, Stefan Dabruck, Florent Hugel, Christopher Braide, Kara DioGuardi, Lindsay Lohan and Robin Schulz.

== Music video ==
The official music video of the song was released on 8 September 2017 through Robin Schulz's YouTube account. The music video was directed by Annegret von Feiertag.

== Track listing ==
Digital download and stream
No.	Title	Length
1.	"I Believe I'm Fine"	3:46

Digital download – The Remixes
No.	Title	Length
1.	"I Believe I'm Fine" (Dimitri Vegas & Like Mike Remix)	4:15
2.	"I Believe I'm Fine" (Dimitri Vegas & Like Mike Remix) (Extended Version)	5:19
3.	"I Believe I'm Fine" (NERVO Remix)	4:29
4.	"I Believe I'm Fine" (DJ Katch Remix)	3:19
5.	"I Believe I'm Fine" (Nick Martin Remix)	4:49
6.	"I Believe I'm Fine" (Adam Trigger Remix)	3:24

== Charts ==
=== Weekly charts ===
Weekly chart performance
Chart (2017)	Peak position
Austria (Ö3 Austria Top 40)	26
Belgium (Ultratip Bubbling Under Wallonia)	30
Germany (GfK)	29
France (SNEP)	182
Sweden (Sverigetopplistan)	92
Switzerland (Schweizer Hitparade)	88

=== Year-end charts ===
Year-end chart performance
Chart (2017)	Position
Latvia Airplay (LaIPA)	77

== Certifications ==
Region	Certification	Certified units/sales
Germany (BVMI)	Gold	200,000^{‡}
^{‡} Sales+streaming figures based on certification alone.
