= Sugar (Robin Schulz album) =

Studio album by Robin Schulz
- Released: 25 September 2015
- Recorded: 2014–2015
- Genre: Deep house; EDM
- Length: 52:17
- Label: Tonspiel; Warner
- Producer: Robin Schulz

Robin Schulz chronology
| Prayer (2014) | Sugar (2015) | Uncovered (2017) |

Singles from Sugar
- 1. "Headlights" Released: 3 April 2015; 2. "Sugar" Released: 17 July 2015; 3. "Show Me Love" Released: 13 November 2015; 4. "Heatwave" Released: 12 February 2016

Sugar is the second studio album by German DJ and record producer Robin Schulz, it was released on 25 September 2015. The album includes the singles "Headlights", "Sugar", "Show Me Love", and "Heatwave".

== Singles ==
- "Headlights" was released as the first single from the album on 3 April 2015. The song features vocals from Ilsey and reached a peak of number two in Australia and Austria. It also charted in Belgium, Denmark, Finland, France, Germany, Hungary, Ireland, Italy, the Netherlands, Norway, Poland, Sweden and Switzerland.
- "Sugar" was released as the second single from the album in July 2015. The song features vocals from Canadian recording artist Francesco Yates and samples Baby Bash's 2003 single "Suga Suga".

== Track listing ==
Sugar track listing
| No. | Title | Writer(s) | Producer(s) | Length |
|---|---|---|---|---|
| 1. | "Headlights" (featuring Ilsey) | Robin Schulz; Ilsey Juber; John Ryan II; Andreas Schuller; Eric Frederic; Thomas Peyton; Joseph Spargur | | 3:29 |
| 2. | "Sugar" (featuring Francesco Yates) | Schulz; Francesco Yates; Dennis Bierbrodt; Guido Kramer; Jürgen Dohr; Francisco Bautista; Ronald Bryant; Nathan Perez | Schulz; Junkx | 3:39 |
| 3. | "Heatwave" (featuring Akon) | Aliaune Thiam; Thomas Troelsen; Bryan Nelson | Schulz; Junkx; Nelson | 3:07 |
| 4. | "Yellow" (with Disciples) | Schulz; Bierbrodt; Kramer; Dohr; Nathan Duvall; Gavin Koolman; Luke McDermott | Schulz; Disciples; JUNKX | 3:36 |
| 5. | "Show Me Love" (with J.U.D.G.E.) | Schulz; Richard Judge; Bierbrodt; Kramer; Dohr | Schulz; Junkx; J.U.D.G.E. | 4:15 |
| 6. | "Love Me Loud" (with M-22 featuring Aleesia) | Schulz; Bierbrodt; Kramer; Dohr; Matthew James; Frank Bülles; Alicia Stamkos; Lucy Batty; Ryan Kowarsky; Daniel Talevski; Alexander Vujic | Schulz; M-22; JUNKX | 3:35 |
| 7. | "Pride" (with SoFly and Nius) | Marvin Gaye; Norman Whitfield; William Stevenson | Schulz; SoFly and Nius; Junkx | 3:04 |
| 8. | "Find Me" (with Heyhey) | Schulz; Bierbrodt; Kramer; Dohr | Schulz; Heyhey; Junkx | 3:17 |
| 9. | "Titanic" | Schulz; Alex Isaak; Bierbrodt; Dohr; Kramer | | 3:41 |
| 10. | "This Is Your Life" | Schulz; Kevin Bleibaum; Dana Al Fardan | | 3:27 |
| 11. | "Save Tonight" (with Moguai featuring Solamay) | Eagle-Eye Cherry | | 3:36 |
| 12. | "4 Life" (featuring Graham Candy) | Schulz; Bierbrodt; Dohr; Kramer; Martijn Konijnenburg | | 3:15 |
| 13. | "Wave Goodbye" (with Henri PFR featuring Jeffrey Jey) | Schulz; Henri Peiffer; Gianfranco Randone | | 3:16 |
| 14. | "World Turns Grey" (with Heyhey featuring Princess Chelsea) | Chelsea Nikkel | | 3:52 |
| 15. | "Moonlit Sky" (with Moby and the Void Pacific Choir) | Richard Melville Hall | | 3:08 |
| Total length: | | | | 52:17 |

Non-US iTunes bonus track
| No. | Title | Length |
|---|---|---|
| 16. | "Sugar" (continuous album mix) | 51:47 |
| Total length: | | 104:04 |

== Charts ==
=== Weekly charts ===
Weekly chart performance for Sugar
| Chart (2015–2016) | Peak position |
|---|---|
| Australian Albums (ARIA) | 31 |
| Austrian Albums (Ö3 Austria) | 4 |
| Belgian Albums (Ultratop Flanders) | 27 |
| Belgian Albums (Ultratop Wallonia) | 23 |
| Canadian Albums (Billboard) | 81 |
| Danish Albums (Hitlisten) | 30 |
| Dutch Albums (Album Top 100) | 48 |
| Finnish Albums (Suomen virallinen lista) | 38 |
| French Albums (SNEP) | 39 |
| German Albums (Offizielle Top 100) | 3 |
| Hungarian Albums (MAHASZ) | 8 |
| Irish Albums (IRMA) | 53 |
| Italian Albums (FIMI) | 22 |
| Norwegian Albums (VG-lista) | 10 |
| Swedish Albums (Sverigetopplistan) | 19 |
| Swiss Albums (Schweizer Hitparade) | 1 |
| US Billboard 200 | 154 |
| US Top Dance Albums (Billboard) | 5 |

=== Year-end charts ===
2015 year-end chart performance for Sugar
| Chart (2015) | Position |
|---|---|
| German Albums (Offizielle Top 100) | 79 |
| Swiss Albums (Schweizer Hitparade) | 72 |

2016 year-end chart performance for Sugar
| Chart (2016) | Position |
|---|---|
| Danish Albums (Hitlisten) | 96 |
| French Albums (SNEP) | 193 |
| Swiss Albums (Schweizer Hitparade) | 100 |

== Certifications ==
Certifications for Sugar
| Region | Certification | Certified units/sales |
|---|---|---|
| Canada (Music Canada) | Gold | 40,000^{‡} |
| Denmark (IFPI Danmark) | Gold | 10,000^{‡} |
| Germany (BVMI) | Gold | 100,000^{‡} |
| New Zealand (RMNZ) | Platinum | 15,000^{‡} |
^{‡} Sales+streaming figures based on certification alone.

== Release history ==
Release history and formats for Sugar
| Region | Date | Format | Label |
|---|---|---|---|
| Various | 25 September 2015 | Digital download; CD | Warner |
