= Sun Goes Down (Robin Schulz song) =

Single by Robin Schulz featuring Jasmine Thompson

from the album Prayer
- Released: 24 October 2014
- Recorded: 2014
- Genre: Deep house; tropical house
- Length: 2:59
- Label: Tonspiel (Warner Music Group)
- Songwriters: Robin Schulz; Tom Havelock
- Producer: Robin Schulz

Robin Schulz singles chronology
"Willst Du" (2014)	"Sun Goes Down" (2014)	"Headlights" (2015)

Jasmine Thompson singles chronology
"Ain't Nobody" (2013)	"Sun Goes Down" (2014)	"Ain't Nobody (Loves Me Better)" (2015)

Music video
- "Sun Goes Down" on YouTube

"Sun Goes Down" is a song by German DJ and record producer Robin Schulz. It features the vocals from British singer Jasmine Thompson. The song was released in Germany as a digital download on 24 October 2014. The song peaked at number two on the German Singles Chart.

It served as the official song of the 2015 CONCACAF Gold Cup.

The song's composition consists of a piano, and a saxophone drop, accompanied by Schulz's beats, and Thompson's vocals. At the beginning of the song, the vocals and the drop, a loud, horn-like sound effect is played.

== Music video ==
The accompanying music video for "Sun Goes Down" was made in September 2014 by director Lilja and shows various protagonists in different places all over Europe.

Filmed in four locations around Europe, the video features actress and model Milla Puolakanaho in Turku, Finland, a group of friends around cinematographer Karol Łakomiec and singer Kasia Zielińska on a rooftop in Warsaw, Poland, terra-cotta artist Dino Daddiego in the old town of Sassi di Matera, Italy, as well as both artists of the song, Robin Schulz and Jasmine Thompson in London, England. The gathering of Jasmine Thompson and her friends was shot in Burgess Park in Southwark, the DJ set with Robin Schulz was shot during a regular gig of his at the club EGG LDN.

The aerials were filmed by Markus Gelhard of Zebraworkz on location in Turku and Matera.

The total length of the video is two minutes and fifty-four seconds. The video was released on 1 October 2014 on Robin Schulz’s YouTube channel and has received more than 750 million views as of September 2022.

== Formats and track listings ==
Digital download – single
No.	Title	Length
1.	"Sun Goes Down" (featuring Jasmine Thompson)	2:57

Digital download – remixes
No.	Title	Length
1.	"Sun Goes Down" (featuring Jasmine Thompson) (Tocadisco Remix)	5:54
2.	"Sun Goes Down" (featuring Jasmine Thompson) (TEEMID Remix)	3:41
3.	"Sun Goes Down" (featuring Jasmine Thompson) (Pingpong Remix)	6:13
4.	"Sun Goes Down" (featuring Jasmine Thompson) (Kris Menace Remix)	4:00
5.	"Sun Goes Down" (featuring Jasmine Thompson) (ManiezzL Remix)	4:50

== Charts ==
=== Weekly charts ===
Chart (2014–15)	Peak position
Australia (ARIA)	7
Austria (Ö3 Austria Top 40)	3
Belgium (Ultratop 50 Flanders)	6
Belgium (Ultratop 50 Wallonia)	8
Colombia (Monitor Latino)	5
Czech Republic Airplay (ČNS IFPI)	2
Finland (Suomen virallinen lista)	18
France (SNEP)	15
Germany (GfK)	2
Hungary (Dance Top 40)	6
Hungary (Single Top 40)	24
Hungary (Stream Top 40)	8
Ireland (IRMA)	11
Mexico Anglo (Monitor Latino)	12
Poland Airplay (ZPAV)	2
Poland Dance (ZPAV)	5
Romania (Airplay 100)	35
Slovenia (SloTop50)	3
Spain (Promusicae)	27
Sweden (Sverigetopplistan)	57
Switzerland (Schweizer Hitparade)	3
UK Singles (Official Charts)	94
US Hot Dance/Electronic Songs (Billboard)	21

=== Year-end charts ===
Chart (2014)	Position
Austria (Ö3 Austria Top 40)	61
Germany (Official German Charts)	29
Hungary (Dance Top 40)	86
Switzerland (Schweizer Hitparade)	53
Chart (2015)	Position
Australia (ARIA)	70
Belgium (Ultratop Wallonia)	81
CIS (Tophit)	9
France (SNEP)	106
Germany (Official German Charts)	58
Hungary (Dance Top 40)	14
Poland (ZPAV)	49
Russia Airplay (Tophit)	8
Slovenia (SloTop50)	12
Spain (PROMUSICAE)	88
Switzerland (Schweizer Hitparade)	47
Ukraine Airplay (Tophit)	55
US Hot Dance/Electronic Songs (Billboard)	80

== Certifications ==
Certifications for "Sun Goes Down"
Region	Certification	Certified units/sales
Australia (ARIA)	Platinum	70,000^{‡}
Austria (IFPI Austria)	Gold	15,000^{*}
Canada (Music Canada)	Gold	40,000^{‡}
Denmark (IFPI Danmark)	Gold	45,000^{‡}
Germany (BVMI)	3× Gold	600,000^{‡}
Italy (FIMI)	Gold	25,000^{‡}
Mexico (AMPROFON)	Gold	30,000^{*}
New Zealand (RMNZ)	Gold	7,500^{*}
Norway (IFPI Norway)	Platinum	40,000^{‡}
Spain (Promusicae)	Platinum	60,000^{‡}
Switzerland (IFPI Switzerland)	Platinum	30,000^{‡}
United Kingdom (BPI)	Silver	200,000^{‡}
^{*} Sales figures based on certification alone.^{‡} Sales+streaming figures based on certification alone.

== Release history ==
Region	Date	Format	Label	Ref.
Germany	24 October 2014	Digital download	Tonspiel (Warner Music Group)	
United Kingdom	7 June 2015	Digital download	Tonspiel (Warner Music Group)	
