= Brian Monaco =

American music executive

Brian J. Monaco
- Born: Brooklyn, NY
- Occupation: Music Executive
- Years active: 1995-present

Brian J. Monaco is an American music executive who is the President, Global Chief Marketing Officer of Sony/ATV Music Publishing.

== Career ==
Upon graduation from the University of Dayton in 1994, Monaco founded Worldwide Talent Group (WTG).

WTG represented authors, politicians, athletes, entertainers and poets. While at WTG, Monaco pioneered the extensive college tours of MTV's “The Real World/Road Rules” cast, which played tour dates in the US, including a show at the Beacon Theatre in New York City.

In 2007, Monaco sold Worldwide Talent Group and went on to become the Executive Vice President, Worldwide Head of Advertising, Film & TV for both EMI Music Publishing and EMI Records, which at the time included Astralwerks, Blue Note Records, Capitol Records, Parlophone and Virgin Records.

In 2012, EMI Music Publishing was acquired by a consortium led by Sony. In July 2012, Monaco joined Sony/ATV Music Publishing as Executive Vice President, Commercial Music Group following the acquisition of EMI Music Publishing.

In 2017 and 2018 Monaco serve on Clio Music juries.

Monaco is currently a voting member of the Rock & Roll Hall of Fame and the Songwriters Hall of Fame. Monaco hosts a proprietary sync camp twice a year for songwriters.
