= Willst du =

Song by German rapper Alligatoah

Single by Alligatoah

from the album Triebwerke
- Released: 16 August 2013
- Recorded: 2013
- Genre: Pop rap
- Length: 3:38
- Label: Trailerpark
- Songwriter(s): Lukas Strobel

Alligatoah singles chronology
"Trauerfeier Lied" (2013)	"Willst du" (2013)	"Denk an die Kinder" (2015)

"Willst du" is a song by German rapper Alligatoah from his third studio album Triebwerke (2013). The song was released in Germany as a digital download on 16 August 2013 and reached number 14 on the German Singles Chart and number 20 on the Austrian Singles Chart. The song's lyrics detail a couple, one of them asking the other if they want to take drugs together.

== Track listing ==
Digital download
No.	Title	Length
1.	"Willst du"	3:38
2.	"Willst du" (Acoustic)	4:03
3.	"Willst du" (Stereoids Remix)	6:25
4.	"Willst du" (Video)	3:43

== Charts ==
=== Weekly charts ===
Chart (2013–14)	Peak position
Austria (Ö3 Austria Top 40)	20
Germany (GfK)	14

=== Year-end charts ===
Chart (2013)	Position
Germany (Official German Charts)	83

== Certifications ==
Region	Certification	Certified units/sales
Austria (IFPI Austria)	Gold	15,000^{*}
Germany (BVMI)	Diamond	1,000,000^{‡}
^{*} Sales figures based on certification alone.^{‡} Sales+streaming figures based on certification alone.

== Release history ==
Region	Date	Format	Label
Germany	16 August 2013	Digital download	Trailerpark

== Robin Schulz version ==
"Willst du"

Single by Robin Schulz and Alligatoah

from the album Prayer
- Released: 22 August 2014
- Recorded: 2014
- Genre: Deep house; dance
- Length: 3:10
- Label: Tonspiel (Warner Music Group)
- Songwriter(s): Lukas Strobel
- Producer(s): Robin Schulz

Robin Schulz singles chronology
"Prayer in C" (2014)	"Willst du" (2014)	"Sun Goes Down" (2014)

German DJ and record producer Robin Schulz remixed the song, with the remix being released as a digital download on 22 August 2014 and reaching number 35 on the German Singles Chart.

=== Music video ===
A music video to accompany the release of "Willst du" was first released onto YouTube on 22 August 2014 at a total length of four minutes and thirteen seconds.

=== Track listing ===
Digital download
No.	Title	Length
1.	"Willst du"	3:10

=== Chart performance ===
Chart (2014)	Peak position
Austria (Ö3 Austria Top 40)	42
Belgium (Ultratip Bubbling Under Flanders)	14
Germany (GfK)	35
Switzerland (Schweizer Hitparade)	47

=== Release history ===
Region	Date	Format	Label
Germany	22 August 2014	Digital download	Tonspiel (Warner Music Group)
