= Sugar (Robin Schulz song) =

2015 single by Robin Schulz featuring Francesco Yates

Single by Robin Schulz featuring Francesco Yates

from the album Sugar
- Released: 17 July 2015
- Length: 3:42
- Label: Tonspiel (Warner Music Group)
- Songwriters: Robin Schulz; Francesco Yates; Francisco Bautista; Nathan Perez; Jay Mac; Ronald Bryant; Dennis Bierbrodt; Guido Kramer; Jürgen Dohr
- Producers: Robin Schulz; JUNKX

Robin Schulz singles chronology
"Headlights" (2015)	"Sugar" (2015)	"Show Me Love" (2015)

Francesco Yates singles chronology
"Call" (2015)	"Sugar" (2015)	"Come Over" (2018)

Music video
- "Sugar" on YouTube

"Sugar" is a song by German DJ and record producer Robin Schulz, featuring vocals from Canadian singer Francesco Yates. The song was released in Germany on 17 July 2015 as the second single from his second studio album of the same name. It interpolates Baby Bash's 2003 single "Suga Suga".

== Music video ==
The music video for this song was released onto YouTube on 24 July 2015 and runs for a total length of three minutes and forty-two seconds. Yates is seen in the video along with a rogue police officer, Officer Finkleman (played by comedian Nathan Barnatt), who gyrates and grooves to the tune of the song while driving. Schulz also appears on a billboard for a concert. In the end, references are made to the music video of Baby Bash's "Suga Suga" when the police officer dresses in the clothes that match those of Baby Bash in that video: a green T-shirt over a white T-shirt, baggy jeans, a chain and a white beanie. At the end of the video, his car meets an accident and tumbles upside down, while still leaving the officer dancing as additional police cars arrive at the scene.

== Chart performance ==
The song has become Schulz's most successful song from the album. "Sugar" was a hit in many European countries, peaking atop the singles chart of seven countries including Austria, Germany and Switzerland, where it became his third chart-topper single in all these countries following 2014's singles "Waves" and "Prayer in C". It also attained to peak at number one in the Czech Republic, Hungary, Poland, and Slovenia. In the United Kingdom, "Sugar" outperformed the album's lead single "Headlights" charting in the top 40 at number 21 and was certified double platinum by the British Phonographic Industry (BPI).

In the United States, the song also became a hit, charting on the Billboard Hot 100 chart at number 44, where it became his third highest-charting single after "Waves" at number 14, and "Prayer in C" at number 23, in 2014. "Sugar" is the only song from the album to chart on the Billboard Hot 100, and was certified platinum by the Recording Industry Association of America (RIAA). The song was certified gold in Austria, double platinum in Australia, Germany, and Switzerland, and five-times platinum in Italy.

== Track listing ==
Digital download
No.	Title	Length
1.	"Sugar" (featuring Francesco Yates)	3:39

CD single
No.	Title	Length
1.	"Sugar" (featuring Francesco Yates)	3:39
2.	"Sugar" (featuring Francesco Yates; extended mix)	5:01

== Charts ==
=== Weekly charts ===
Weekly chart performance for "Sugar"
Chart (2015–2016)	Peak position
Argentina Airplay (Monitor Latino)	18
Australia (ARIA)	3
Austria (Ö3 Austria Top 40)	1
Belgium (Ultratop 50 Flanders)	10
Belgium (Ultratop 50 Wallonia)	3
Brazil Hot 100 (Billboard)	76
Canada Hot 100 (Billboard)	42
CIS Airplay (TopHit)	7
Czech Republic Airplay (ČNS IFPI)	3
Czech Republic Singles Digital (ČNS IFPI)	1
Denmark (Tracklisten)	22
Finland (Suomen virallinen lista)	10
France (SNEP)	2
Germany (GfK)	1
Hungary (Dance Top 40)	1
Hungary (Rádiós Top 40)	2
Hungary (Single Top 40)	2
Hungary (Stream Top 40)	1
Ireland (IRMA)	16
Italy (FIMI)	3
Mexico Anglo Airplay (Monitor Latino)	19
Netherlands (Dutch Top 40)	4
Netherlands (Single Top 100)	6
New Zealand (Recorded Music NZ)	4
Norway (VG-lista)	9
Poland Airplay (ZPAV)	2
Poland Dance (ZPAV)	1
Russia Airplay (TopHit)	8
South Africa Airplay (EMA)	10
Slovakia Singles Digital (ČNS IFPI)	2
Slovenia Airplay (SloTop50)	1
Spain (Promusicae)	22
Sweden (Sverigetopplistan)	9
Switzerland (Schweizer Hitparade)	1
Ukraine Airplay (TopHit)	12
UK Singles (Official Charts)	21
UK Dance (Official Charts)	6
US Billboard Hot 100	44
US Dance Club Songs (Billboard)	44
US Hot Dance/Electronic Songs (Billboard)	2
US Adult Pop Airplay (Billboard)	37
US Pop Airplay (Billboard)	14

2017 weekly chart performance for "Sugar"
Chart (2017)	Peak position
CIS Airplay (TopHit)	186
Russia Airplay (TopHit)	164

2023–2026 weekly chart performance for "Sugar"
Chart (2023–2026)	Peak position
Estonia Airplay (TopHit)	128
Latvia Airplay (LaIPA)	15
Lithuania Airplay (TopHit)	73
Moldova Airplay (TopHit)	200
Romania Airplay (TopHit)	172

Weekly chart performance for "Sugar" (Alok Remix)
Chart (2025)	Peak position
Latvia Airplay (TopHit)	44

Weekly chart performance for "Sugar" (Zerb Remix)
Chart (2025)	Peak position
Latvia Airplay (TopHit)	10

=== Monthly charts ===
2015 monthly chart performance for "Sugar"
Chart (2015)	Peak position
CIS Airplay (TopHit)	9
Russia Airplay (TopHit)	10
Ukraine Airplay (TopHit)	20

2016 monthly chart performance for "Sugar"
Chart (2016)	Peak position
CIS Airplay (TopHit)	25
Russia Airplay (TopHit)	23
Ukraine Airplay (TopHit)	69

2025 monthly chart performance for "Sugar"
Chart (2025)	Peak position
Latvia Airplay (TopHit)	52

2025 monthly chart performance for "Sugar" (Alok Remix)
Chart (2025)	Peak position
Latvia Airplay (TopHit)	47

2025 monthly chart performance for "Sugar" (Zerb Remix)
Chart (2025)	Peak position
Latvia Airplay (TopHit)	43

=== Year-end charts ===
2015 year-end chart performance for "Sugar"
Chart (2015)	Position
Australia (ARIA)	48
Austria (Ö3 Austria Top 40)	10
Belgium (Ultratop Flanders)	78
Belgium (Ultratop Wallonia)	76
CIS Airplay (TopHit)	90
France (SNEP)	39
Germany (Official German Charts)	8
Hungary (Dance Top 40)	26
Hungary (Rádiós Top 40)	47
Italy (FIMI)	30
Netherlands (Dutch Top 40)	43
Netherlands (Single Top 100)	53
New Zealand (Recorded Music NZ)	46
Poland (ZPAV)	22
Russia Airplay (TopHit)	89
Slovenia Airplay (SloTop50)	42
Sweden (Sverigetopplistan)	55
Switzerland (Schweizer Hitparade)	18
Ukraine Airplay (TopHit)	156
US Hot Dance/Electronic Songs (Billboard)	36

2016 year-end chart performance for "Sugar"
Chart (2016)	Position
Argentina Airplay (Monitor Latino)	35
Belgium (Ultratop Wallonia)	81
Brazil (Brasil Hot 100)	45
CIS Airplay (TopHit)	87
Denmark (Tracklisten)	89
France (SNEP)	73
Germany (Official German Charts)	82
Hungary (Dance Top 40)	8
Hungary (Rádiós Top 40)	29
Hungary (Single Top 40)	35
Italy (FIMI)	52
Netherlands (Dutch Top 40)	63
Netherlands (Single Top 100)	53
New Zealand (Recorded Music NZ)	48
Russia Airplay (TopHit)	89
Spain (Promusicae)	84
Sweden (Sverigetopplistan)	91
Switzerland (Schweizer Hitparade)	36
UK Singles (Official Charts Company)	88
US Hot Dance/Electronic Songs (Billboard)	12

2017 year-end chart performance for "Sugar"
Chart (2017)	Position
Hungary (Rádiós Top 40)	60

2025 year-end chart performance for "Sugar"
Chart (2025)	Position
Lithuania Airplay (TopHit)	131

== Certifications ==
Certifications for "Sugar"
Region	Certification	Certified units/sales
Australia (ARIA)	6× Platinum	420,000^{‡}
Austria (IFPI Austria)	Platinum	30,000^{‡}
Belgium (BRMA)	Platinum	20,000^{‡}
Canada (Music Canada)	6× Platinum	480,000^{‡}
Denmark (IFPI Danmark)	2× Platinum	180,000^{‡}
France (SNEP)	Diamond	333,333^{‡}
Germany (BVMI)	Diamond	1,000,000^{‡}
Italy (FIMI)	5× Platinum	250,000^{‡}
Netherlands (NVPI)	Platinum	30,000^{‡}
New Zealand (RMNZ)	5× Platinum	150,000^{‡}
Norway (IFPI Norway)	Platinum	40,000^{‡}
Poland (ZPAV)	3× Diamond	750,000^{‡}
Portugal (AFP)	Platinum	20,000^{‡}
Spain (Promusicae)	2× Platinum	120,000^{‡}
Switzerland (IFPI Switzerland)	2× Platinum	60,000^{‡}
United Kingdom (BPI)	2× Platinum	1,200,000^{‡}
United States (RIAA)	Platinum	1,000,000^{‡}
^{‡} Sales+streaming figures based on certification alone.

== Release history ==
Release history and formats for "Sugar"
Region	Date	Format	Label	Ref.
Germany	17 July 2015	CD; digital download	Tonspiel (Warner Music Group)	
United States	8 December 2015	Mainstream radio	Atlantic; Big Beat; RRP	
