= Francesco Yates =

Canadian singer-songwriter (born 1995)

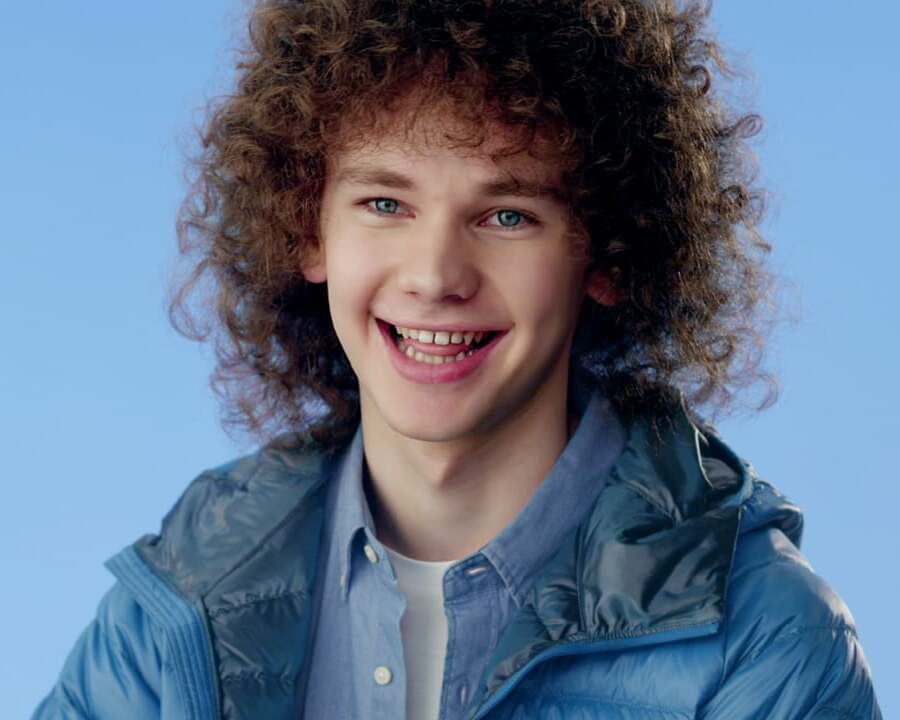
- Yates in 2014

Background information
- Born: Francesco David Yates; September 11, 1995 (age 31); Toronto, Ontario, Canada
- Genres: Pop; R&B
- Occupations: Singer-songwriter
- Instruments: Vocals; guitar; piano
- Years active: 2012–present
- Labels: Atlantic; FY
- Website: francescoyates.com

Francesco David Yates (born September 11, 1995) is a Canadian singer-songwriter, best known for his featurette in the 2015 hit single "Sugar" by German DJ Robin Schulz.

== Life and career ==
Yates was born in Toronto, Ontario, and started writing music at the age of 11. He signed to Atlantic Records when he was 16. His self-titled debut EP, released on September 11, 2015, was co-produced by Robin Hannibal and Pharrell Williams.

In 2015, Yates received the Heatseeker Award at the Canadian Radio Music Awards and performed at the official Canada Day celebration in Ottawa. He provides the vocals on the Robin Schulz song "Sugar". He also performed at We Day events across Canada that same year. In 2016, he was an opening act for Canadian pop rock band Hedley on their Hello World Tour with Carly Rae Jepsen.

On February 2, 2018, his single "Come Over", was released, alongside the announcement that Francesco was going to be the opening act on the Canadian leg of Justin Timberlake's The Man of the Woods Tour. His next song, "Do You Think About Me", was released on April 6. This is the first song which Yates wrote, produced, and performed entirely by himself. He released his single "Somebody Like You", on July 20.

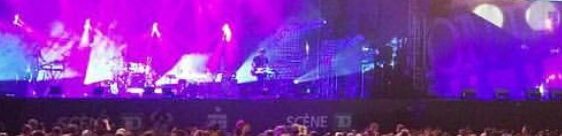
Yates performing in 2016

At the end of August, it was announced that he was opening for Justin Timberlake again on the remaining North American part of his tour. The tour ended on April 13, 2019, after being postponed due to Timberlake suffering from bruised vocal cords.

On December 27, 2019, Yates officially released his single "I Got You", having previously uploaded it on SoundCloud at the beginning of the year.

On April 10, 2020, Yates released his single "Superbad" along with an official video. On May 29, 2020, he released a second single called "Bad Decisions". On June 26, 2020, Yates released his second EP Superbad. It features the two previously released singles, as well as the songs "Angel", "Dirty Little Secrets", and "Queen St. Blues". The EP is accompanied by a short film, which contains parts of the songs.

On September 18, 2020, his single "Late Night Love" was released. On February 14, 2021, Yates released his song "Dive".

After performing it on an episode of The Recording Academy's "Press Play at Home" series, on June 10, 2022, he released his single "Jimi", which is inspired by the famous guitarist Jimi Hendrix. In July, he announced on Instagram that he's opening for Backstreet Boys on the American and Canadian leg of their DNA World Tour.

Yates released his songs "Thunderbomb" and "Chanel" on April 14, 2023, and May 5, 2023, respectively. Both songs were later included in his second EP Little Rockstar alongside "Jimi" and three other songs.

== Discography ==
=== Extended plays ===
| Title | Album details |
|---|---|
| Francesco Yates | Release date: September 11, 2015; Label: Atlantic; Format: CD, digital download, streaming |
| Superbad | Release date: June 26, 2020; Label: FY; Format: Digital download, streaming |

=== Singles ===
==== As main artist ====
| Title | Year | Peak positions | | Album |
| Title | Year | CAN | FRA | Album |
|---|---|---|---|---|
| "When I Found You" | 2014 | — | — | Francesco Yates EP |
| "Better to Be Loved" | 2015 | 37 | 196 | Francesco Yates EP |
| "Nobody Like You" | 2015 | — | — | Non-album single |
| "Call" | 2015 | 77 | — | Francesco Yates EP |
| "Come Over" | 2018 | — | — | Non-album singles |
| "Do You Think About Me" | 2018 | — | — | Non-album singles |
| "Somebody Like You" | 2018 | — | — | Non-album singles |
| "I Got You" | 2019 | — | — | Non-album singles |
| "Superbad" | 2020 | — | — | Superbad |
| "Bad Decisions" | 2020 | — | — | Superbad |
| "Late Night Love" | 2020 | — | — | Non-album singles |
| "Dive" | 2021 | — | — | Non-album singles |
| "Jimi" | 2022 | — | — | TBA |
| "Thunderbomb" | 2023 | — | — | TBA |
| "Chanel" | 2023 | — | — | TBA |
"—" denotes a recording that did not chart or was not released.

==== As featured artist ====
| Title | Year | Peak positions | | | | | | | | | Certifications | Album |
| Title | Year | CAN | AUT | FRA | GER | NLD | SWE | SWI | UK | US | Certifications | Album |
|---|---|---|---|---|---|---|---|---|---|---|---|---|
| "Sugar" (Robin Schulz featuring Francesco Yates) | 2015 | 42 | 1 | 2 | 1 | 6 | 9 | 1 | 21 | 44 | ARIA: 6× Platinum; BVMI: 2× Platinum; RMNZ: Gold; FIMI: Platinum | Sugar |
| "Hurts to Love You" (ATCK featuring AJ McLean, Francesco Yates and Kelsie Watts) | 2020 | — | — | — | — | — | — | — | — | — | | Non-album singles |
| "Don't Call Me Back" (ATCK featuring Francesco Yates, DJ Lux and AJ McLean) | 2021 | — | — | — | — | — | — | — | — | — | | Non-album singles |
"—" denotes a recording that did not chart or was not released.
