= Shed a Light =

Single by Robin Schulz and David Guetta featuring Cheat Codes

from the album Uncovered
- Released: 25 November 2016
- Genre: House
- Length: 3:11
- Label: Tonspiel
- Songwriters: Robin Schulz; David Guetta; Jason Evigan; Jacob Kasher; Giorgio Tuinfort; Stefan Dabruck; John Ryan; Guido Kramer; Dennis Bierbrodt; Ammar Malik; Jürgen Dohr
- Producers: Robin Schulz; David Guetta; Guido Kramer; Dennis Bierbrodt; Jürgen Dohr; Trevor Dahl

Robin Schulz singles chronology
| "Heatwave" (2016) | "Shed a Light" (2016) | "OK" (2017) |

David Guetta singles chronology
| "Would I Lie to You" (2016) | "Shed a Light" (2016) | "Light My Body Up" (2017) |

Cheat Codes singles chronology
| "Queen Elizabeth" (2016) | "Shed a Light" (2016) | "No Promises" (2017) |

Music video
- "Shed a Light (Official Music)" on YouTube

"Shed a Light" is a song by German DJ and record producer Robin Schulz and French DJ and music producer David Guetta, featuring American electronic music DJ trio Cheat Codes. The song was released as a digital download in Germany on 25 November 2016 as the lead single from Schulz's third studio album Uncovered (2017). It was written by Schulz, Guetta, Jason Evigan, Jacob Kasher, Giorgio Tuinfort, Stefan Dabruck, John Ryan, Guido Kramer, Dennis Bierbrodt, Ammar Malik, and Jürgen Dohr.

== Music video ==
The official music video of the song was released on 31 January 2017 through Robin Schulz's YouTube account. It was directed by Mario Clement and produced by Christopher Kane, and features actors Franziska Nylen and Christopher Reinhardt. The music video is about a male and female astronaut couple on a space mission, when the male crashes to a planet in his spaceship. His lover speeds to him in her spaceship, but he becomes surrounded by dark matter and warns her not to come closer. She does not heed his warning and goes to his side, causing both to be consumed by the matter.

== Track listings ==
Digital download
| No. | Title | Length |
|---|---|---|
| 1. | "Shed a Light" (featuring Cheat Codes) | 3:11 |

CD single
| No. | Title | Length |
|---|---|---|
| 1. | "Shed a Light" | 3:11 |
| 2. | "Shed a Light" (extended version) | 5:04 |

Digital download – remixes, part 1
| No. | Title | Length |
|---|---|---|
| 1. | "Shed a Light" (extended version) | 5:04 |
| 2. | "Shed a Light" (Moti remix) | 4:31 |
| 3. | "Shed a Light" (Hugel remix) | 4:30 |
| 4. | "Shed a Light" (Oliver Moldan remix) | 4:55 |
| 5. | "Shed a Light" (Blank & Jones remix) | 4:35 |
| 6. | "Shed a Light" (Blank & Jones Relax remix) | 4:31 |

Digital download – remixes, part 2
| No. | Title | Length |
|---|---|---|
| 1. | "Shed a Light" (MDZN remix) | 3:27 |
| 2. | "Shed a Light" (Mosimann remix) | 6:01 |
| 3. | "Shed a Light" (Heyder remix) | 3:39 |
| 4. | "Shed a Light" (Aligee remix) | 4:12 |
| 5. | "Shed a Light" (Tocadisco remix) | 6:22 |
| 6. | "Shed a Light" (acoustic version) | 3:19 |

== Charts ==
=== Weekly charts ===
| Chart (2016–17) | Peak position |
|---|---|
| Argentina Anglo (Monitor Latino) | 15 |
| Australia (ARIA) | 23 |
| Austria (Ö3 Austria Top 40) | 7 |
| Belgium (Ultratip Bubbling Under Flanders) | 13 |
| Belgium (Ultratop 50 Wallonia) | 26 |
| Czech Republic Airplay (ČNS IFPI) | 23 |
| Czech Republic Singles Digital (ČNS IFPI) | 31 |
| Denmark (Tracklisten) | 35 |
| Finland Download (Latauslista) | 5 |
| France (SNEP) | 44 |
| Germany (GfK) | 6 |
| Hungary (Dance Top 40) | 22 |
| Hungary (Rádiós Top 40) | 4 |
| Hungary (Single Top 40) | 22 |
| Ireland (IRMA) | 24 |
| Italy (FIMI) | 27 |
| Mexico Airplay (Billboard) | 8 |
| Netherlands (Dutch Top 40) | 21 |
| Netherlands (Single Top 100) | 20 |
| New Zealand (Recorded Music NZ) | 29 |
| Norway (VG-lista) | 30 |
| Poland Airplay (ZPAV) | 8 |
| Portugal (AFP) | 37 |
| Scottish Singles Sales (Official Charts) | 12 |
| Slovakia Singles Digital (ČNS IFPI) | 65 |
| Slovenia Airplay (SloTop50) | 11 |
| Spain (Promusicae) | 38 |
| Sweden (Sverigetopplistan) | 36 |
| Switzerland (Schweizer Hitparade) | 19 |
| UK Singles (Official Charts) | 24 |
| UK Dance (Official Charts) | 4 |
| US Hot Dance/Electronic Songs (Billboard) | 11 |

=== Year-end charts ===
| Chart (2017) | Position |
|---|---|
| Australia (ARIA) | 100 |
| Austria (Ö3 Austria Top 40) | 75 |
| Germany (Official German Charts) | 80 |
| Hungary (Dance Top 40) | 66 |
| Hungary (Rádiós Top 40) | 79 |
| Hungary (Stream Top 40) | 84 |
| Italy (FIMI) | 97 |
| Latvia Airplay (LaIPA) | 22 |
| Netherlands (Dutch Top 40) | 98 |
| Poland Airplay (ZPAV) | 66 |
| Switzerland (Schweizer Hitparade) | 58 |
| US Hot Dance/Electronic Songs (Billboard) | 47 |

== Certifications ==
| Region | Certification | Certified units/sales |
|---|---|---|
| Australia (ARIA) | 2× Platinum | 140,000^{‡} |
| Austria (IFPI Austria) | Gold | 15,000^{‡} |
| Canada (Music Canada) | Platinum | 80,000^{‡} |
| Denmark (IFPI Danmark) | Gold | 45,000^{‡} |
| France (SNEP) | Gold | 66,666^{‡} |
| Germany (BVMI) | Platinum | 400,000^{‡} |
| Italy (FIMI) | 2× Platinum | 100,000^{‡} |
| New Zealand (RMNZ) | Platinum | 30,000^{‡} |
| Poland (ZPAV) | Gold | 25,000^{‡} |
| Spain (Promusicae) | Gold | 20,000^{‡} |
| United Kingdom (BPI) | Gold | 400,000^{‡} |
^{‡} Sales+streaming figures based on certification alone.

== Release history ==
| Region | Date | Format | Label |
|---|---|---|---|
| Germany | 25 November 2016 | Digital download | Tonspiel (WMG) |
| Germany | 9 December 2016 | CD single | Tonspiel (WMG) |
| Various | 10 February 2017 | Digital download (remixes, part 1) | Tonspiel (WMG) |
| Various | 24 February 2017 | Digital download (remixes, part 2) | Tonspiel (WMG) |
