= Show Me Love (Robin Schulz song) =

Single by Robin Schulz & J.U.D.G.E.

from the album Sugar
- Released: 13 November 2015
- Recorded: 2014–15
- Genre: Deep house
- Length: 4:15
- Label: Tonspiel (Warner Music Group)
- Songwriters: Dennis Bierbrodt; Jürgen Dohr; Guido Kramer; Robin Schulz; Richard Judge
- Producers: Robin Schulz; Richard Judge

Robin Schulz singles chronology
"Sugar" (2015)	"Show Me Love" (2015)	"Heatwave" (2016)

J.U.D.G.E. singles chronology
"Show Me Love" (2015)

"Show Me Love" is a song by German DJ and record producer Robin Schulz and British singer Richard Judge. The song was released as a digital download in Germany on 13 November 2015 as the third single from his second studio album Sugar (2015). The song was written by Dennis Bierbrodt, Jürgen Dohr, Guido Kramer, Robin Schulz and Richard Judge.

== Music video ==
The music video for this song was released onto YouTube on 13 November 2015 and runs for a total length of four minutes and fifty-one seconds.

== Track listing ==
Digital download
No.	Title	Length
1.	"Show Me Love"	4:15

Digital download - Remixes
No.	Title	Length
1.	"Show Me Love" (HUGEL Remix)	5:11
2.	"Show Me Love" (MOGUAI Remix)	5:34
3.	"Show Me Love" (Max Manie & KT Remix)	4:23
4.	"Show Me Love" (Garry Ocean Remix)	6:16
5.	"Show Me Love" (Spada Remix)	4:31
6.	"Show Me Love" (Acoustic Version)	4:15

== Charts and certifications ==
=== Weekly charts ===
Chart (2015–16)	Peak position
Austria (Ö3 Austria Top 40)	4
Belgium (Ultratip Bubbling Under Flanders)	3
Belgium (Ultratop 50 Wallonia)	44
Germany (GfK)	2
Hungary (Dance Top 40)	25
Hungary (Rádiós Top 40)	30
Hungary (Single Top 40)	3
Poland Airplay (ZPAV)	1
Slovenia (SloTop50)	5
Switzerland (Schweizer Hitparade)	12

=== Year-end charts ===
Chart (2015)	Position
Germany (Official German Charts)	93

Chart (2016)	Position
Austria (Ö3 Austria Top 40)	71
Germany (Official German Charts)	75
Hungary (Dance Top 40)	85
Hungary (Single Top 40)	59
Poland (ZPAV)	13
Slovenia (SloTop50)	50
Switzerland (Schweizer Hitparade)	71

=== Certifications ===
Region	Certification	Certified units/sales
Austria (IFPI Austria)	Gold	15,000^{‡}
Germany (BVMI)	Platinum	400,000^{‡}
Italy (FIMI)	Gold	25,000^{‡}
Poland (ZPAV)	2× Platinum	40,000^{‡}
Switzerland (IFPI Switzerland)	Gold	15,000^{‡}
^{‡} Sales+streaming figures based on certification alone.

== Release history ==
Region	Date	Format	Label	Ref.
Germany	13 November 2015	Digital download; CD	Tonspiel (Warner Music Group)	
Italy	22 January 2016	Contemporary hit radio	Warner	
