= Prayer (album) =

Studio album by Robin Schulz
- Released: 19 September 2014
- Genre: Deep house; EDM; tropical house
- Length: 66:48
- Label: Tonspiel; Warner
- Producer: Robin Schulz

Robin Schulz chronology
Prayer (2014)	Sugar (2015)

Singles from Prayer
- 1. "Waves" Released: 4 February 2014; 2. "Prayer in C" Released: 6 June 2014; 3. "Willst Du" Released: 22 August 2014; 4. "Sun Goes Down" Released: 24 October 2014

Prayer is the debut studio album by German DJ and record producer Robin Schulz, released on 19 September 2014. The album includes the singles "Waves (Robin Schulz Remix)", "Prayer in C (Robin Schulz Remix)", "Willst Du" and "Sun Goes Down".

== Singles ==
- "Waves (Robin Schulz Remix)" (Mr. Probz) was released as the first single from the album on 4 February 2014. The original was released by Mr. Probz on 22 November 2013. The song was remixed by Robin Schulz. The song topped the charts in Austria, Germany, Hungary, Norway, Sweden, Switzerland and the United Kingdom and also reached the top ten in Canada, Denmark, Finland, France, Ireland, Italy and Spain.
- "Prayer in C (Robin Schulz Remix)" (Lilly Wood and the Prick) was released as the second single from the album on 6 June 2014. He released the song with Lilly Wood and the Prick. The song topped the charts in Austria, Belgium, Denmark, Finland, France, Germany, Ireland, the Netherlands, Norway, Spain, Sweden, Switzerland and the United Kingdom.
- "Willst Du" was released as the third single from the album on 22 August 2014. The song has charted in Austria, Germany and Switzerland.
- "Sun Goes Down" was released as the fourth single from the album on 24 October 2014. The song features vocals from British singer Jasmine Thompson. The song peaked at number two in Germany and number three in Austria and Switzerland. The song has also charted in Australia, Belgium, Finland, France, Spain and Sweden.

== Track listing ==
Prayer track listing
No.	Title	Writer(s)	Producer(s)	Length
1.	"Prayer in C" (with Lilly Wood & the Prick; Robin Schulz radio edit)	Benjamin Cotto; Nili Hadida; Pierre Guimard; Robin Schulz	Guimard; Schulz^{[a]}	3:09
2.	"Willst Du" (with Alligatoah)	Lukas Stobel	Schulz	3:10
3.	"Sun Goes Down" (featuring Jasmine Thompson; radio mix)	Tom Havelock; Schulz	Schulz	2:59
4.	"No Rest for the Wicked" (by Lykke Li; Robin Schulz edit)	Björn Yttling; Lykke Li	Yttling; Li; Lasse Mårtén^{[b]}; Schulz^{[a]}	3:21
5.	"Rather Be" (by Clean Bandit featuring Jess Glynne; Robin Schulz edit)	Grace Chatto; James Napier; Jack Patterson; Nicole Marshall	Chatto; Patterson; Schulz^{[a]}	3:12
6.	"We Don't Have to Take Our Clothes Off" (by Lexer and Nico Pusch; radio mix)	Narada Michael Walden; Preston Glass	Lexer; Nico Pusch	3:20
7.	"House on Fire" (with Me and My Monkey; radio mix)	Iman H. Mehdi	Mehdi; Schulz	3:20
8.	"Taking Me Home" (by Heyhey; radio mix)	Heyhey	Heyhey	3:02
9.	"Never Know Me" (with Dansir; radio mix)	Daniel Bruns; Schulz	Bruns; Dansir; Schulz	3:18
10.	"Snowflakes" (with Pingpong; radio edit)	Ryan Lawhon	Pingpong	3:24
11.	"Waves" (by Mr. Probz; Robin Schulz radio edit)	Dennis Princewell Stehr	Schulz^{[a]}	3:27
12.	"Warm Minds" (radio mix)	Schulz	Schulz	3:24
13.	"Wrong" (radio mix)	Schulz	Schulz	3:26
14.	"Summer Nights" (by Scheinizzl and Chroph featuring David Lageder; radio mix)	David Lageder; Christoph Scheinast; Florian Scheinast	C. Scheinast; F. Scheinast	3:46
15.	"Spree Ahoi" (by Thomas Lizzara featuring Steven Coulter; radio edit)	Steven Coulter; Thomas Lizzara	Coulter; Lizzara	4:00
16.	"Hier mit Dir" (with Tom Thaler and Basil; Robin Schulz radio mix)	Marius Förster; Tom Ulrichs	Basil; Schulz^{[a]}	3:16
17.	"Changes" (by Faul & Wad Ad vs. Pnau; Robin Schulz remix – radio edit)	Nick Littlemore; Peter Mayes; Sam Littlemore	Schulz^{[a]}	3:24
18.	"A Sky Full of Stars" (by Coldplay; Robin Schulz edit)	Chris Martin; Guy Berryman; Jonny Buckland; Will Champion; Tim Bergling	Coldplay; Daniel Green; Paul Epworth; Rik Simpson; Avicii; Schulz^{[a]}	3:15
19.	"Whatever" (by Stil & Bense)	Dr. Arne Bense; Thomas Kunde	Stil & Bense	3:18
20.	"In the Morning Light" (by Alex Schulz; radio mix)	Alex Schulz	Alex Schulz	3:17
Total length:				66:48

iTunes bonus track (pre-order only)
No.	Title	Length
21.	"Prayer" (continuous DJ mix)	77:55

Notes

- "Snowflakes" contains a sample of "Snowflakes" by White Apple Tree.
- ^{^[a]} signifies a remixer
- ^{^[a]} signifies a vocal producer

== Charts ==
=== Weekly charts ===
Weekly chart performance for Prayer
Chart (2014–2015)	Peak position
Australian Albums (ARIA)	37
Austrian Albums (Ö3 Austria)	10
Belgian Albums (Ultratop Flanders)	42
Belgian Albums (Ultratop Wallonia)	42
Danish Albums (Hitlisten)	30
Dutch Albums (Album Top 100)	54
Finnish Albums (Suomen virallinen lista)	31
French Albums (SNEP)	73
German Albums (Offizielle Top 100)	7
Irish Albums (IRMA)	29
Italian Albums (FIMI)	98
Norwegian Albums (VG-lista)	20
Swedish Albums (Sverigetopplistan)	18
Swiss Albums (Schweizer Hitparade)	4
UK Albums (OCC)	86
UK Album Downloads (OCC)	86
UK Dance Albums (OCC)	1
US Billboard 200	42
US Top Dance Albums (Billboard)	3

=== Year-end charts ===
2014 year-end chart performance for Prayer
Chart (2014)	Rank
German Albums (Offizielle Top 100)	82
Swiss Albums (Schweizer Hitparade)	70

2015 year-end chart performance for Prayer
Chart (2015)	Rank
Australian Dance Albums (ARIA)	34
Swedish Albums (Sverigetopplistan)	99
Swiss Albums (Schweizer Hitparade)	51
US Dance/Electronic Albums (Billboard)	16

== Certifications ==
Certifications for Prayer
Region	Certification	Certified units/sales
Canada (Music Canada)	Platinum	80,000^{‡}
Denmark (IFPI Danmark)	Gold	10,000^{‡}
Germany (BVMI)	Platinum	200,000^{‡}
New Zealand (RMNZ)	2× Platinum	30,000^{‡}
Norway (IFPI Norway)	Gold	15,000^{‡}
Switzerland (IFPI Switzerland)	Gold	10,000^{^}
United Kingdom (BPI)	Platinum	300,000^{‡}
^{^} Shipments figures based on certification alone.^{‡} Sales+streaming figures based on certification alone.

== Release history ==
Release history and formats for Prayer
Region	Date	Format	Label
Australia	19 September 2014	CD; digital download	
New Zealand	19 September 2014	CD; digital download	TONSPIEL; Warner
Europe	19 September 2014	CD; digital download	TONSPIEL; Warner
United Kingdom	15 June 2015	CD; digital download	TONSPIEL; Warner
