= Headlights (Robin Schulz song) =

Single by Robin Schulz featuring Ilsey

from the album Sugar
- Released: 3 April 2015
- Recorded: 2014
- Genre: Tropical house; dance
- Length: 3:29
- Label: Tonspiel (Warner Music Group)
- Songwriters: Tom Peyton; Ilsey Juber; John Ryan; Eric Frederic; Robin Schulz; Andreas Schuller; Joe London
- Producer: Robin Schulz

Robin Schulz singles chronology
"Sun Goes Down" (2014)	"Headlights" (2015)	"Sugar" (2015)

Ilsey singles chronology
"Headlights" (2015)

"Headlights" is a song by German DJ and record producer Robin Schulz. It features the vocals from American singer and songwriter Ilsey. The song was released in Germany as a digital download on 3 April 2015 as the lead single from his second studio album Sugar (2015). The song has peaked at number 6 on the German Singles Chart. The song was written by Robin Schulz, Ilsey Juber, John Ryan, Andreas Schuller, Eric Frederic, Tom Peyton and Joe London. The original demo version included a sample of an acoustic guitar taken from a sample library, which was replayed for the official release by Mark Summers at Scorccio Sample Replays.

== Music video ==
A music video to accompany the release of "Headlights" was first released onto YouTube on 3 April 2015 at a total length of three minutes and forty-nine seconds. The video features a small group of pool-goers in an abandoned waterpark in Algarve, Portugal. The people do water-related stunts in the empty pools. The video ends with a couple posing with, and then driving off in a Toyota Aygo, with the numberplate "AYGO8".

== Track listing ==
Digital download
No.	Title	Length
1.	"Headlights" (featuring Ilsey)	3:29

CD single
No.	Title	Length
1.	"Headlights" (featuring Ilsey)	3:29
2.	"Headlights" (featuring Ilsey; extended version)	5:30

== Chart performance ==
=== Weekly charts ===
Chart (2015)	Peak position
Australia (ARIA)	2
Austria (Ö3 Austria Top 40)	2
Belgium (Ultratop 50 Flanders)	16
Belgium (Ultratop 50 Wallonia)	14
Czech Republic Airplay (ČNS IFPI)	9
Denmark (Tracklisten)	37
Finland (Suomen virallinen lista)	15
France (SNEP)	30
Germany (GfK)	6
Hungary (Dance Top 40)	20
Hungary (Rádiós Top 40)	16
Hungary (Single Top 40)	12
Hungary (Stream Top 40)	8
Ireland (IRMA)	39
Italy (FIMI)	17
Netherlands (Dutch Top 40)	26
Netherlands (Single Top 100)	33
Norway (VG-lista)	8
Poland Airplay (ZPAV)	15
Slovenia (SloTop50)	5
Spain (Promusicae)	29
Sweden (Sverigetopplistan)	17
Switzerland (Schweizer Hitparade)	7
UK Singles (Official Charts)	96
US Hot Dance/Electronic Songs (Billboard)	17

=== Year-end charts ===
Chart (2015)	Position
Australia (ARIA)	63
Austria (Ö3 Austria Top 40)	17
Belgium (Ultratop Flanders)	100
Belgium (Ultratop Wallonia)	83
France (SNEP)	129
Germany (Official German Charts)	19
Hungary (Dance Top 40)	96
Hungary (Rádiós Top 40)	90
Hungary (Single Top 40)	51
Italy (FIMI)	52
Netherlands (Single Top 100)	99
Slovenia (SloTop50)	37
Spain (PROMUSICAE)	69
Sweden (Sverigetopplistan)	65
Switzerland (Schweizer Hitparade)	21
US Hot Dance/Electronic Songs (Billboard)	45

== Certifications ==
Region	Certification	Certified units/sales
Australia (ARIA)	Platinum	70,000^{‡}
Austria (IFPI Austria)	Gold	15,000^{‡}
Canada (Music Canada)	Gold	40,000^{‡}
Denmark (IFPI Danmark)	Gold	30,000^{^}
Germany (BVMI)	3× Gold	900,000^{‡}
Italy (FIMI)	2× Platinum	100,000^{‡}
New Zealand (RMNZ)	Gold	7,500^{*}
Norway (IFPI Norway)	2× Platinum	80,000^{‡}
Poland (ZPAV)	2× Platinum	100,000^{‡}
Spain (Promusicae)	Platinum	40,000^{‡}
Sweden (GLF)	Gold	20,000^{‡}
Switzerland (IFPI Switzerland)	Gold	15,000^{‡}
United Kingdom (BPI)	Silver	200,000^{‡}
^{*} Sales figures based on certification alone.^{^} Shipments figures based on certification alone.^{‡} Sales+streaming figures based on certification alone.

== Release history ==
Region	Date	Format	Label	Ref.
Germany	3 April 2015	Digital download	Tonspiel (Warner Music Group)	
Germany	24 April 2015	CD single	Tonspiel (Warner Music Group)	
