= Robin Schulz =

German DJ and record producer (born 1987)

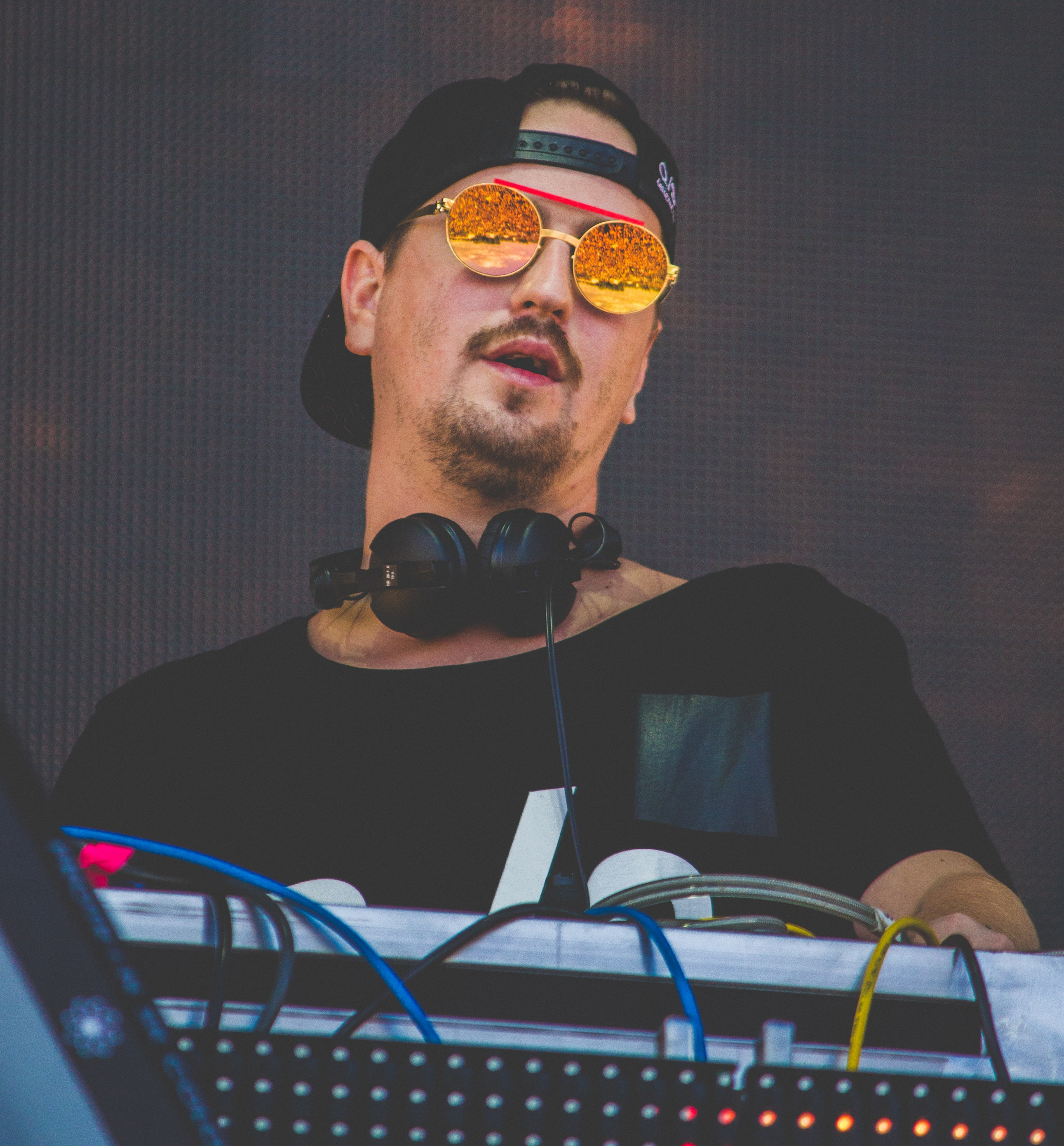
- Schulz performing in 2017

Background information
- Also known as: KOPPY
- Born: Robin Schulz; 28 April 1987 (age 39); Osnabrück, West Germany
- Genres: Deep house; tropical house; future house
- Occupations: Musician; DJ; record producer
- Instruments: Digital audio workstation; synthesizer; keyboards
- Years active: 2007–present
- Labels: Tonspiel; Warner; Big Beat
- Website: robin-schulz.com

Robin Schulz's "Show Me Love" official music video

Robin Alexander Schulz (German pronunciation: [ˈʁɔbɪn ʔalɛkˈsandɐ ˈʃʊlts]; born 28 April 1987) is a German musician, DJ, and record producer. On 4 February 2014, he released the first single from his debut album, a remix of "Waves" by Dutch hip-hop artist Mr. Probz. This remix later received a nomination for Best Remixed Recording, Non-Classical at the 57th Annual Grammy Awards.

His follow-up single, released 6 June 2014, was a remix of the Lilly Wood and the Prick track "Prayer in C" from their 2010 album Invincible Friends. Both remixes have charted in many European countries and the United States, leading to international recognition for Schulz. He co-founded Lausbuben Records with Daniel Bruns and Christopher Noble.

== Career ==
=== 2004–2012: Early career ===
Born in Osnabrück, West Germany in 1987, Schulz began working as a DJ at age 17, earning his own club night in three years. In 2009, Schulz began producing his own music, which would eventually receive millions of views on his YouTube channel.

=== 2013–2014: Prayer ===
Schulz remixed the song "Waves" by Mr. Probz in a more up-tempo fashion, with the remix being released as a single on 4 February 2014 in North America and 7 February 2014 in Europe. The song became a worldwide hit, topping the charts in Austria, Germany, Norway, Sweden, Switzerland and the United Kingdom, and peaking within the top five of the charts in Denmark, Finland, Hungary, Ireland and Italy. An alternate version of the Schulz remix was released on 11 November 2014, featuring additional vocals from American rapper T.I. and American singer Chris Brown. Schulz released a remix of the song "Prayer in C" by Lilly Wood and the Prick on 6 June 2014. The remix topped the charts in Austria, Germany, Switzerland, Luxembourg, France, Netherlands, Belgium, Greece, Italy, Hungary, Czech Republic, Slovakia, Poland, Denmark, Finland, Norway, Sweden, Portugal, Spain, Ireland, and the United Kingdom. This track also reached the top 10 in Australia and New Zealand and charted in Canada and the United States. He released "Willst Du" as the third single from the album on 22 August 2014.

The song has charted in Germany, Austria and Switzerland. On 24 October 2014, "Sun Goes Down" was released as the fourth single from the album, featuring vocals from British singer Jasmine Thompson. The song has peaked to number 2 in Germany and number 3 in Austria, Poland and Switzerland. The song has also charted in Finland, France and Sweden.

=== 2015: Sugar ===
After the success of "Prayer in C" and "Waves", Schulz released the lead single from his second studio album titled "Headlights" featuring vocals from American singer and songwriter Ilsey. The song was a mild success in Europe. Schulz later released "Sugar" featuring vocals from Canadian singer Francesco Yates. The song was a success in Europe as well, with success in the US and Canada, and over a billion Spotify streams. Schulz released his second album of the same name on 25 September 2015. A third single titled "Show Me Love" featuring Richard Judge was released with a music video.

=== 2016–present: Uncovered and film ===
A new single from Schulz premiered on his YouTube channel on 24 November 2016, titled "Shed a Light" with French DJ David Guetta and American DJ trio Cheat Codes on production, with one Cheat Codes member on vocals. The song was first uploaded as a lyric video, and later had an official video on 31 January 2017. A film on Schulz, simply titled Robin Schulz – The Movie was in the making, with multiple teasers on his YouTube channel starting from 12 October 2016. The official 90-minute movie was uploaded on 1 March 2017. It was a documentary style film on Schulz's life after the smash hits of his first album, and also revealed his new fashion line, called "Q/S Designed by Robin Schulz". The movie also features other notable producers being interviewed such as Lost Frequencies, Axwell and Ingrosso, Oliver Heldens and Sam Feldt.

== Discography ==
- Prayer (2014)
- Sugar (2015)
- Uncovered (2017)
- IIII (2021)
- Pink (2023)

== Awards and nominations ==
Award	Year	Nominee(s)	Category	Result	Ref.
Echo Music Prize	2015	Robin Schulz	Best National Newcomer	Nominated	
Echo Music Prize	2015	Robin Schulz	Best National Dance	Won	
Echo Music Prize	2015	"Prayer in C"	Hit of the Year	Nominated	
Echo Music Prize	2015	"Waves"	Hit of the Year	Nominated	
Echo Music Prize	2016	Robin Schulz	Best National Act Abroad	Won	
Echo Music Prize	2016	Robin Schulz	Best National Dance	Won	
Echo Music Prize	2018	Robin Schulz	Best National Dance	Won	

=== DJ Magazine top 100 DJs ===
Year	Position	Notes	Ref.
2015	89	New Entry	
2016	69	Up 20	
2017	76	Down 7	
2018	60	Up 16	
2019	82	Down 22	
2020	99	Down 17	

=== Grammy Awards ===
Year	Nominee / work	Award	Result
2015	"Waves" (Robin Schulz Remix)	Best Remixed Recording, Non-Classical	Nominated

=== Berlin Music Video Awards ===
Year	Nominee / work	Award	Result
2020	IN YOUR EYES	Best Animation	Nominated
2023	Miss You	Most Trashy	Nominated
