= German airplay chart =

German music chart

The official German airplay chart is an airplay chart compiled by MusicTrace on behalf of Bundesverband Musikindustrie (Federal Association of Phonographic Industry; BVMI). The chart was introduced in 1977 and was first compiled by Nielsen Music Control and since September 2015 by MusicTrace. The Current Number one is "Find Me" by Aris Tiffany.

== Records ==
=== Song achievements ===
==== Most weeks at number one ====
13 weeks

- Nelly Furtado – "Say It Right" (2007)

11 Weeks

- Ed Sheeran – "Azizam" (2025)

9 weeks

- Leona Lewis – "Bleeding Love" (2008)
- Robbie Williams – "Bodies" (2009)
- Robin Schulz featuring Francesco Yates – "Sugar" (2015)
- Miley Cyrus – "Flowers" (2023)
- The Weeknd – "Dancing in the Flames" (2024)
- Taylor Swift – "The Fate of Ophelia" (2025/2026)

8 weeks

- Daniel Powter – "Bad Day" (2005)
- Pink – "So What" (2008)
- Pink – "Blow Me (One Last Kiss)" (2012)
- Rihanna – "Diamonds" (2012/2013)
- Avicii featuring Aloe Blacc – "Wake Me Up" (2013)
- Katy Perry – "Roar" (2013)
- Adele – "Hello" (2015/2016)
- Justin Timberlake – "Can't Stop the Feeling!" (2016)
- David Guetta – "Flames" (2018)
- Calvin Harris – "Promises" (2018)
- Ed Sheeran and Justin Bieber – "I Don't Care" (2019)
- Ed Sheeran – "Bad Habits" (2021)
- Harry Styles – "As It Was" (2022)
- Alex Warren – "Fever Dream" (2026)

=== Artist achievements ===
==== Most weeks at number one ====
Artist	Wks.
Pink	51
Ed Sheeran	50
Robin Schulz	46
David Guetta	34
Katy Perry	34
Robbie Williams	32
Ava Max	28
Nelly Furtado	25
Sia	24
Taylor Swift	24

==== Most number-one songs ====
Artist	No.	Songs
Pink	15	"Stupid Girls"; "Who Knew"; "So What"; "Sober"; "Please Don't Leave Me"; "Funhouse"; "I Don't Believe You"; "Bad Influence"; "Raise Your Glass"; "Perfect"; "Blow Me (One Last Kiss)"; "Just Give Me a Reason"; "What About Us"; "Cover Me in Sunshine"; "Trustfall"
Robin Schulz	15	"Waves"; "Prayer in C"; "Sun Goes Down"; "Headlights"; "Sugar"; "Show Me Love"; "OK"; "Unforgettable"; "Oh Child"; "Alane"; "All We Got"; "One More Time"; "Young Right Now"; "In Your Arms (For an Angel)"; "I'll Be There"
Ed Sheeran	11	"Thinking Out Loud"; "Shape of You"; "Galway Girl"; "Perfect"; "I Don't Care"; "Afterglow"; "Bad Habits"; "Shivers"; "Eyes Closed"; "Azizam"; "Sapphire"
David Guetta	10	"Lovers on the Sun"; "Dangerous"; "Would I Lie to You"; "Flames"; "Let's Love"; "I'm Good (Blue)"; "Baby Don't Hurt Me"; "I Don't Wanna Wait"; Forever Young"; "Gone Gone Gone"
Katy Perry	10	"I Kissed a Girl"; "Hot n Cold"; "Waking Up in Vegas"; "California Gurls"; "Teenage Dream"; "Last Friday Night (T.G.I.F.)"; "Roar"; "Chained to the Rhythm"; "Feels; "Bandaids"
Nico Santos	9	"Home"; "Safe"; "Better"; "Running Back to You"; "Would I Lie to You"; "In Your Arms (For an Angel)"; "Weekend Lover"; "All Time High"; "Why Don't You Stay"
Calvin Harris	8	"We Found Love"; "Blame"; "Outside"; "My Way"; "Feels"; "One Kiss"; "Promises"; "Giant"
Robbie Williams	8	"Misunderstood"; "Tripping"; "Advertising Space"; "Sin Sin Sin"; "Bodies"; "Shame"; "Candy"; "The Days"
Ava Max	8	"Sweet but Psycho"; "So Am I"; "Salt"; "Kings & Queens"; "My Head & My Heart"; "Maybe You're the Problem"; "Whatever"; "Forever Young"
Rihanna	7	"Umbrella"; "S&M"; "We Found Love"; "Diamonds"; "Stay"; "Can't Remember to Forget You"; "FourFiveSeconds"
Dua Lipa	7	"One Kiss"; "Don't Start Now"; "Physical"; "Prisoner"; "Love Again"; "Dance the Night; "Houdini"
OneRepublic	7	"Apologize"; "Stop and Stare"; "Secrets"; "All the Right Moves"; "Good Life"; "Love Runs Out"; "I Don't Wanna Wait"

== Number-one songs by year ==
=== 2007 ===
Week	Title	Artist
1	"Shame"	Monrose
2	"If Everyone Cared"	Nickelback
3	"All Good Things (Come to an End)"	Nelly Furtado
4	"All Good Things (Come to an End)"	Nelly Furtado
5	"All Good Things (Come to an End)"	Nelly Furtado
6	"Lied 1 – Stück vom Himmel"	Herbert Grönemeyer
7	"Lied 1 – Stück vom Himmel"	Herbert Grönemeyer
8	"Lied 1 – Stück vom Himmel"	Herbert Grönemeyer
9	"Lied 1 – Stück vom Himmel"	Herbert Grönemeyer
10	"Lied 1 – Stück vom Himmel"	Herbert Grönemeyer
11	"Say It Right"	Nelly Furtado
12	"Say It Right"	Nelly Furtado
13	"Say It Right"	Nelly Furtado
14	"Say It Right"	Nelly Furtado
15	"What Goes Around... Comes Around"	Justin Timberlake
16	"Say It Right"	Nelly Furtado
17	"Say It Right"	Nelly Furtado
18	"Say It Right"	Nelly Furtado
19	"Say It Right"	Nelly Furtado
20	"Say It Right"	Nelly Furtado
21	"Say It Right"	Nelly Furtado
22	"Say It Right"	Nelly Furtado
23	"Makes Me Wonder"	Maroon 5
24	"Makes Me Wonder"	Maroon 5
25	"Say It Right"	Nelly Furtado
26	"Umbrella"	Rihanna featuring Jay-Z
27	"Say It Right"	Nelly Furtado
28	"4 in the Morning"	Gwen Stefani
29	"4 in the Morning"	Gwen Stefani
30	"Big Girls Don't Cry"	Fergie
31	"Big Girls Don't Cry"	Fergie
32	"Big Girls Don't Cry"	Fergie
33	"Rockstar"	Nickelback
34	"1973"	James Blunt
35	"1973"	James Blunt
36	"1973"	James Blunt
37	"1973"	James Blunt
38	"1973"	James Blunt
39	"1973"	James Blunt
40	"Hey There Delilah"	Plain White T's
41	"1973"	James Blunt
42	"When Did Your Heart Go Missing?"	Rooney
43	"When Did Your Heart Go Missing?"	Rooney
44	"About You Now"	Sugababes
45	"About You Now"	Sugababes
46	"About You Now"	Sugababes
47	"Apologize"	Timbaland presents OneRepublic
48	"Apologize"	Timbaland presents OneRepublic
49	"Apologize"	Timbaland presents OneRepublic
50	"Apologize"	Timbaland presents OneRepublic
51	"Apologize"	Timbaland presents OneRepublic
52	"Apologize"	Timbaland presents OneRepublic

=== 2008 ===
Week	Title	Artist
1	"Apologize"	Timbaland presents OneRepublic
2	"Bleeding Love"	Leona Lewis
3	"Bleeding Love"	Leona Lewis
4	"Bleeding Love"	Leona Lewis
5	"Bleeding Love"	Leona Lewis
6	"Bleeding Love"	Leona Lewis
7	"Early Winter"	Gwen Stefani
8	"I'll Be Waiting"	Lenny Kravitz
9	"Bleeding Love"	Leona Lewis
10	"Bleeding Love"	Leona Lewis
11	"Bleeding Love"	Leona Lewis
12	"Bleeding Love"	Leona Lewis
13	"Stop and Stare"	OneRepublic
14	"Stop and Stare"	OneRepublic
15	"Stop and Stare"	OneRepublic
16	"Stop and Stare"	OneRepublic
17	"Mercy"	Duffy
18	"4 Minutes"	Madonna featuring Justin Timberlake
19	"4 Minutes"	Madonna featuring Justin Timberlake
20	"4 Minutes"	Madonna featuring Justin Timberlake
21	"Love Song"	Sara Bareilles
22	"Love Song"	Sara Bareilles
23	"Love Song"	Sara Bareilles
24	"Love Song"	Sara Bareilles
25	"Helden 2008"	Revolverheld
26	"Helden 2008"	Revolverheld
27	"Better in Time"	Leona Lewis
28	"Mercy"	Duffy
29	"Viva la Vida"	Coldplay
30	"Viva la Vida"	Coldplay
31	"Viva la Vida"	Coldplay
32	"Viva la Vida"	Coldplay
33	"Viva la Vida"	Coldplay
34	"Viva la Vida"	Coldplay
35	"I Kissed a Girl"	Katy Perry
36	"I Kissed a Girl"	Katy Perry
37	"So What"	Pink
38	"So What"	Pink
39	"So What"	Pink
40	"So What"	Pink
41	"So What"	Pink
42	"So What"	Pink
43	"So What"	Pink
44	"So What"	Pink
45	"Through the Eyes of a Child"	Reamonn
46	"Through the Eyes of a Child"	Reamonn
47	"Miles Away"	Madonna
48	"Miles Away"	Madonna
49	"Hot n Cold"	Katy Perry
50	"Hot n Cold"	Katy Perry
51	"Hot n Cold"	Katy Perry
52	"Sober"	Pink

=== 2009 ===
Week	Title	Artist
1	"Sober"	Pink
2	"Sober"	Pink
3	"Broken Strings"	James Morrison featuring Nelly Furtado
4	"Broken Strings"	James Morrison featuring Nelly Furtado
5	"Broken Strings"	James Morrison featuring Nelly Furtado
6	"Broken Strings"	James Morrison featuring Nelly Furtado
7	"Irgendwas bleibt"	Silbermond
8	"Irgendwas bleibt"	Silbermond
9	"Irgendwas bleibt"	Silbermond
10	"Irgendwas bleibt"	Silbermond
11	"Irgendwas bleibt"	Silbermond
12	"Irgendwas bleibt"	Silbermond
13	"My Life Would Suck Without You"	Kelly Clarkson
14	"My Life Would Suck Without You"	Kelly Clarkson
15	"Ayo Technology"	Milow
16	"Ayo Technology"	Milow
17	"Please Don't Leave Me"	Pink
18	"Please Don't Leave Me"	Pink
19	"Please Don't Leave Me"	Pink
20	"Please Don't Leave Me"	Pink
21	"Please Don't Leave Me"	Pink
22	"The Whole Story"	Sunrise Avenue
23	"Ayo Technology"	Milow
24	"Ayo Technology"	Milow
25	"Moments Like This"	Reamonn
26	"Moments Like This"	Reamonn
27	"Moments Like This"	Reamonn
28	"Waking Up in Vegas"	Katy Perry
29	"Waking Up in Vegas"	Katy Perry
30	"Waking Up in Vegas"	Katy Perry
31	"21 Guns"	Green Day
32	"21 Guns"	Green Day
33	"21 Guns"	Green Day
34	"21 Guns"	Green Day
35	"21 Guns"	Green Day
36	Manos al Aire	Nelly Furtado
37	"Funhouse"	Pink
38	"Bodies"	Robbie Williams
39	"Bodies"	Robbie Williams
40	"Bodies"	Robbie Williams
41	"Bodies"	Robbie Williams
42	"Bodies"	Robbie Williams
43	"Bodies"	Robbie Williams
44	"Bodies"	Robbie Williams
45	"Bodies"	Robbie Williams
46	"Bodies"	Robbie Williams
47	"Secrets"	OneRepublic
48	"Pflaster"	Ich + Ich
49	"Pflaster"	Ich + Ich
50	"Pflaster"	Ich + Ich
51	"I Will Love You Monday (365)"	Aura Dione
52	"I Don't Believe You"	Pink
53	"I Don't Believe You"	Pink

=== 2010 ===
Week	Title	Artist
1	"Secrets"	OneRepublic
2	"I Like"	Keri Hilson
3	"Fireflies"	Owl City
4	"Fireflies"	Owl City
5	"Fireflies"	Owl City
6	"Fireflies"	Owl City
7	"Fireflies"	Owl City
8	"Fight for This Love"	Cheryl Cole
9	"Fight for This Love"	Cheryl Cole
10	"Fight for This Love"	Cheryl Cole
11	"Fight for This Love"	Cheryl Cole
12	"All the Right Moves"	OneRepublic
13	"All the Right Moves"	OneRepublic
14	"Satellite"	Lena Meyer-Landrut
15	"Satellite"	Lena Meyer-Landrut
16	"Bad Influence"	Pink
17	"Bad Influence"	Pink
18	"Whataya Want from Me"	Adam Lambert
19	"Whataya Want from Me"	Adam Lambert
20	"Whataya Want from Me"	Adam Lambert
21	"Whataya Want from Me"	Adam Lambert
22	"Whataya Want from Me"	Adam Lambert
23	"California Gurls"	Katy Perry featuring Snoop Dogg
24	"California Gurls"	Katy Perry featuring Snoop Dogg
25	"California Gurls"	Katy Perry featuring Snoop Dogg
26	"California Gurls"	Katy Perry featuring Snoop Dogg
27	"California Gurls"	Katy Perry featuring Snoop Dogg
28	"California Gurls"	Katy Perry featuring Snoop Dogg
29	"Alejandro"	Lady Gaga
30	"Alejandro"	Lady Gaga
31	"Alejandro"	Lady Gaga
32	"Alejandro"	Lady Gaga
33	"We No Speak Americano"	Yolanda Be Cool and DCUP
34	"Wonderful Life"	Hurts
35	"Wonderful Life"	Hurts
36	"Alejandro"	Lady Gaga
37	"Teenage Dream"	Katy Perry
38	"Teenage Dream"	Katy Perry
39	"Teenage Dream"	Katy Perry
40	"Teenage Dream"	Katy Perry
41	"Shame"	Robbie Williams and Gary Barlow
42	"Stay the Night"	James Blunt
43	"Raise Your Glass"	Pink
44	"Raise Your Glass"	Pink
45	"Raise Your Glass"	Pink
46	"Raise Your Glass"	Pink
47	"Raise Your Glass"	Pink
48	"Raise Your Glass"	Pink
49	"Just the Way You Are"	Bruno Mars
50	"Raise Your Glass"	Pink
51	"Just the Way You Are"	Bruno Mars
52	"Hold My Hand"	Michael Jackson featuring Akon

=== 2011 ===
Week	Title	Artist
1	"Good Life"	OneRepublic
2	"Good Life"	OneRepublic
3	"Rolling in the Deep"	Adele
4	"Rolling in the Deep"	Adele
5	"Rolling in the Deep"	Adele
6	"Rolling in the Deep"	Adele
7	"Grenade"	Bruno Mars
8	"Grenade"	Bruno Mars
9	"Stay"	Hurts
10	"Stay"	Hurts
11	"Stay"	Hurts
12	"Hollywood Hills"	Sunrise Avenue
13	"Perfect"	Pink
14	"You and Me (In My Pocket)"	Milow
15	"You and Me (In My Pocket)"	Milow
16	"You and Me (In My Pocket)"	Milow
17	"You and Me (In My Pocket)"	Milow
18	"S&M"	Rihanna
19	"Price Tag"	Jessie J featuring B.o.B
20	"Price Tag"	Jessie J featuring B.o.B
21	"Price Tag"	Jessie J featuring B.o.B
22	"Price Tag"	Jessie J featuring B.o.B
23	"Price Tag"	Jessie J featuring B.o.B
24	"Price Tag"	Jessie J featuring B.o.B
25	"Price Tag"	Jessie J featuring B.o.B
26	"The Lazy Song"	Bruno Mars
27	"The Lazy Song"	Bruno Mars
28	"Mr. Saxobeat"	Alexandra Stan
29	"Last Friday Night (T.G.I.F.)"	Katy Perry
30	"Last Friday Night (T.G.I.F.)"	Katy Perry
31	"The Edge of Glory"	Lady Gaga
32	"The Edge of Glory"	Lady Gaga
33	"The Edge of Glory"	Lady Gaga
34	"Danza Kuduro"	Lucenzo featuring Don Omar
35	"Danza Kuduro"	Lucenzo featuring Don Omar
36	"New Age"	Marlon Roudette
37	"New Age"	Marlon Roudette
38	"New Age"	Marlon Roudette
39	"New Age"	Marlon Roudette
40	"New Age"	Marlon Roudette
41	"New Age"	Marlon Roudette
42	"New Age"	Marlon Roudette
43	"Marry You"	Bruno Mars
44	"Marry You"	Bruno Mars
45	"Marry You"	Bruno Mars
46	"Geronimo"	Aura Dione
47	"Paradise"	Coldplay
48	"Geronimo"	Aura Dione
49	"We Found Love"	Rihanna featuring Calvin Harris
50	"Hangover"	Taio Cruz featuring Flo Rida
51	"Hangover"	Taio Cruz featuring Flo Rida
52	"Somebody That I Used to Know"	Gotye featuring Kimbra

=== 2012 ===
Week	Title	Artist
1	"Somebody That I Used to Know"	Gotye featuring Kimbra
2	"Somebody That I Used to Know"	Gotye featuring Kimbra
3	"Somebody That I Used to Know"	Gotye featuring Kimbra
4	"Somebody That I Used to Know"	Gotye featuring Kimbra
5	"Himmel auf"	Silbermond
6	"Heart Skips a Beat"	Olly Murs featuring Rizzle Kicks
7	"Ai se eu te pego!"	Michel Teló
8	"Ai se eu te pego!"	Michel Teló
9	"Ai se eu te pego!"	Michel Teló
10	"Heart Skips a Beat"	Olly Murs featuring Rizzle Kicks
11	"Heart Skips a Beat"	Olly Murs featuring Rizzle Kicks
12	"Friends"	Aura Dione
13	"Friends"	Aura Dione
14	"Drive By"	Train
15	"Breathing"	Jason Derulo
16	"Heart Skips a Beat"	Olly Murs featuring Rizzle Kicks
17	"Heart Skips a Beat"	Olly Murs featuring Rizzle Kicks
18	"Count On Me"	Bruno Mars
19	"Count On Me"	Bruno Mars
20	"Count On Me"	Bruno Mars
21	"Tage wie diese"	Die Toten Hosen
22	"Tage wie diese"	Die Toten Hosen
23	"Too Close"	Alex Clare
24	"Too Close"	Alex Clare
25	"Too Close"	Alex Clare
26	"M&F"	Die Ärzte
27	"Payphone"	Maroon 5 featuring Wiz Khalifa
28	"Whistle"	Flo Rida
29	"Whistle"	Flo Rida
30	"Blow Me (One Last Kiss)"	Pink
31	"Blow Me (One Last Kiss)"	Pink
32	"Blow Me (One Last Kiss)"	Pink
33	"Blow Me (One Last Kiss)"	Pink
34	"Blow Me (One Last Kiss)"	Pink
35	"Blow Me (One Last Kiss)"	Pink
36	"Blow Me (One Last Kiss)"	Pink
37	"Blow Me (One Last Kiss)"	Pink
38	"Candy"	Robbie Williams
39	"Candy"	Robbie Williams
40	"Candy"	Robbie Williams
41	"Candy"	Robbie Williams
42	"Candy"	Robbie Williams
43	"Diamonds"	Rihanna
44	"Diamonds"	Rihanna
45	"Diamonds"	Rihanna
46	"Diamonds"	Rihanna
47	"Diamonds"	Rihanna
48	"Diamonds"	Rihanna
49	"Diamonds"	Rihanna
50	"Skyfall"	Adele
51	"Skyfall"	Adele
52	"Skyfall"	Adele

=== 2005–2006, 2013 – present ===
- 2005
- 2006
- 2013
- 2014
- 2015
- 2016
- 2017
- 2018
- 2019
- 2020
- 2021
- 2022
- 2023
- 2024
- 2025
- 2026
