= List of German airplay number-one songs of 2022 =

The official German Airplay Chart is an airplay chart compiled by Nielsen Music Control on behalf of Bundesverband Musikindustrie (Federal Association of Phonographic Industry).

== Chart history ==
Key
‡	Indicates singles which also reached the top of the German singles chart

Issue date	Title	Artist(s)	Ref.
7 January	"Easy on Me" ‡	Adele	
14 January	"Moth to a Flame"	Swedish House Mafia and The Weeknd	
21 January	"Young Right Now"	Robin Schulz and Dennis Lloyd	
28 January	"Young Right Now"	Robin Schulz and Dennis Lloyd	
4 February	"ABCDEFU" ‡	Gayle	
11 February	"ABCDEFU" ‡	Gayle	
18 February	"ABCDEFU" ‡	Gayle	
25 February	"ABCDEFU" ‡	Gayle	
4 March	"ABCDEFU" ‡	Gayle	
11 March	"Infinity"	Jaymes Young	
18 March	"Infinity"	Jaymes Young	
25 March	"In the Dark"	Purple Disco Machine and Sophie and the Giants	
1 April	"In the Dark"	Purple Disco Machine and Sophie and the Giants	
8 April	"In the Dark"	Purple Disco Machine and Sophie and the Giants	
15 April	"In the Dark"	Purple Disco Machine and Sophie and the Giants	
22 April	"In the Dark"	Purple Disco Machine and Sophie and the Giants	
29 April	"In the Dark"	Purple Disco Machine and Sophie and the Giants	
6 May	"In Your Arms (For an Angel)"	Topic, Robin Schulz, Nico Santos and Paul van Dyk	
13 May	"Sorry"	ClockClock	
20 May	"As It Was" ‡	Harry Styles	
27 May	"As It Was" ‡	Harry Styles	
3 June	"As It Was" ‡	Harry Styles	
10 June	"As It Was" ‡	Harry Styles	
17 June	"As It Was" ‡	Harry Styles	
24 June	"As It Was" ‡	Harry Styles	
1 July	"As It Was" ‡	Harry Styles	
8 July	"As It Was" ‡	Harry Styles	
15 July	"Maybe You're the Problem"	Ava Max	
22 July	"Maybe You're the Problem"	Ava Max	
29 July	"Maybe You're the Problem"	Ava Max	
5 August	"Maybe You're the Problem"	Ava Max	
12 August	"Weekend Lover"	Nico Santos	
19 August	"Weekend Lover"	Nico Santos	
26 August	"Weekend Lover"	Nico Santos	
2 September	"Weekend Lover"	Nico Santos	
9 September	"Weekend Lover"	Nico Santos	
16 September	"Weekend Lover"	Nico Santos	
23 September	"Looking for Love"	Lena	
30 September	"Sunroof"	Nicky Youre and Dazy	
7 October	"Hold Me Closer"	Elton John and Britney Spears	
14 October	"Hold Me Closer"	Elton John and Britney Spears	
21 October	"Hold Me Closer"	Elton John and Britney Spears	
28 October	"Hold Me Closer"	Elton John and Britney Spears	
4 November	"Hold Me Closer"	Elton John and Britney Spears	
11 November	"Hold Me Closer"	Elton John and Britney Spears	
18 November	"I'm Good (Blue)" ‡	David Guetta and Bebe Rexha	
25 November	"I'm Good (Blue)" ‡	David Guetta and Bebe Rexha	
2 December	"Hold Me Closer"	Elton John and Britney Spears	
9 December	"Someone Else"	ClockClock	
16 December	"Someone Else"	ClockClock	
23 December	"Anti-Hero"	Taylor Swift	
30 December	"Anti-Hero"	Taylor Swift	
