= Never Go Back =

Never Go Back may refer to:

== Books ==
- Never Go Back (novel), a Jack Reacher novel by Lee Child
- Never Go Back, a Harry Barnett novel by Robert Goddard 2007
- Never Go Back, novel by Margaret Pargeter Mills & Boon 1977
- Never Go Back, novel by Henry Cloud 2014
- Never Go Back, novel by Anne Weale Mills & Boon 1995

== Film ==
- Jack Reacher: Never Go Back, a 2016 film starring Tom Cruise

== Music ==
- "Never Go Back" (song), a song by Dennis Lloyd
- "Never Go Back", a song by Evanescence from Evanescence
- "Never Go Back", a song by Camper Van Beethoven from Our Beloved Revolutionary Sweetheart
- "Never Go Back", a song by Grace Potter and the Nocturnals from The Lion the Beast the Beat
