= Never Go Back (song) =

2019 single by Dennis Lloyd

Single by Dennis Lloyd

from the EP Exident
- Language: English; Spanish
- Released: 15 February 2019
- Genre: Pop rock; reggae
- Length: 2:55
- Label: Arista
- Songwriter: Nir Tibor
- Producer: Dennis Lloyd

Dennis Lloyd singles chronology
"Leftovers" (2017)	"Never Go Back" (2019)	"Wild West" (2019)

Music video
- "Never Go Back" on YouTube

"Never Go Back" is a song by Israeli singer-songwriter Dennis Lloyd. Written and produced by Lloyd, it was released by Arista Records on 15 February 2019 as the lead single from his debut extended play, Exident (2019). The song's lyrics are a continuation of the narrative of his 2016 single "Nevermind". Lloyd said, "I recorded 'Nevermind' at the beginning of my relationship, and I wrote 'Never Go Back' two days after we broke up."

== Track listing ==
Digital download
No.	Title	Length
1.	"Never Go Back"	2:55

Digital download – Remixes
No.	Title	Length
1.	"Never Go Back" (Robin Schulz remix)	3:04
2.	"Never Go Back" (Eden Prince remix)	2:57
3.	"Never Go Back"	2:55

== Charts ==
=== Weekly charts ===
Chart (2019)	Peak position
Austria (Ö3 Austria Top 40)	32
Belgium (Ultratop 50 Wallonia)	38
Czech Republic Airplay (ČNS IFPI)	20
France (SNEP)	51
Germany (GfK)	40
Israel International Airplay (Media Forest)	1
Lithuania (AGATA)	53
Portugal (AFP)	91
Slovakia Singles Digital (ČNS IFPI)	61
Sweden (Sverigetopplistan)	49
Switzerland (Schweizer Hitparade)	31

=== Year-end charts ===
Chart (2019)	Position
France (SNEP)	128
Switzerland (Schweizer Hitparade)	56

== Certifications ==
Region	Certification	Certified units/sales
Denmark (IFPI Danmark)	Gold	45,000^{‡}
France (SNEP)	Platinum	200,000^{‡}
Germany (BVMI)	Gold	200,000^{‡}
Poland (ZPAV)	Gold	10,000^{‡}
Portugal (AFP)	Platinum	10,000^{‡}
Switzerland (IFPI Switzerland)	Platinum	20,000^{‡}
Streaming
Sweden (GLF)	Gold	4,000,000^{†}
^{‡} Sales+streaming figures based on certification alone.^{†} Streaming-only figures based on certification alone.
