= List of German airplay number-one songs of 2014 =

The official German airplay chart ranks the most frequently broadcast songs on German radio stations. In 2014, 21 different songs reached the top, based on weekly airplay data compiled by MusicTrace on behalf of Bundesverband Musikindustrie (BVMI). The radio stations are chosen based on the reach of each station. A specific number of evaluated stations is not given.

== Chart history ==
Key
‡	Indicates singles which also reached the top of the German single chart

Issue date	Title	Artist(s)	Ref.
5 January	"Changes" ‡	Faul & Wad Ad vs. Pnau	
12 January	"Demons"	Imagine Dragons	
19 January	"Happy" ‡	Pharrell Williams	
26 January	"Happy" ‡	Pharrell Williams	
2 February	"Happy" ‡	Pharrell Williams	
9 February	"Happy" ‡	Pharrell Williams	
16 February	"Hard out Here"	Lily Allen	
23 February	"Can't Remember to Forget You"	Shakira featuring Rihanna	
2 March	"Can't Remember to Forget You"	Shakira featuring Rihanna	
9 March	"Waves" (Robin Schulz Remix) ‡	Mr. Probz	
16 March	"Waves" (Robin Schulz Remix) ‡	Mr. Probz	
23 March	"Waves" (Robin Schulz Remix) ‡	Mr. Probz	
30 March	"Waves" (Robin Schulz Remix) ‡	Mr. Probz	
6 April	"Addicted to You"	Avicii featuring Audra Mae	
13 April	"Addicted to You"	Avicii featuring Audra Mae	
20 April	"Rather Be" ‡	Clean Bandit featuring Jess Glynne	
27 April	"Waves (Robin Schulz Remix)" ‡	Mr. Probz	
4 May	"Traum" ‡	Cro	
11 May	"Is It Right"	Elaiza	
18 May	"Is It Right"	Elaiza	
25 May	"Traum" ‡	Cro	
1 June	"Traum" ‡	Cro	
8 June	"Traum" ‡	Cro	
15 June	"Traum" ‡	Cro	
22 June	"Traum" ‡	Cro	
29 June	"A Sky Full of Stars"	Coldplay	
6 July	"Love Runs Out"	OneRepublic	
13 July	"Love Runs Out"	OneRepublic	
20 July	"Prayer in C" (Robin Schulz Remix) ‡	Lilly Wood and the Prick and Robin Schulz	
27 July	"Love Runs Out"	OneRepublic	
3 August	"When the Beat Drops Out" ‡	Marlon Roudette	
10 August	"When the Beat Drops Out" ‡	Marlon Roudette	
17 August	"When the Beat Drops Out" ‡	Marlon Roudette	
24 August	"Prayer in C" (Robin Schulz Remix) ‡	Lilly Wood and the Prick and Robin Schulz	
31 August	"Lovers on the Sun" ‡	David Guetta featuring Sam Martin	
7 September	"Lovers on the Sun" ‡	David Guetta featuring Sam Martin	
14 September	"Lovers on the Sun" ‡	David Guetta featuring Sam Martin	
21 September	"Prayer in C" (Robin Schulz Remix) ‡	Lilly Wood and the Prick and Robin Schulz	
28 September	"Superheroes"	The Script	
5 October	"Superheroes"	The Script	
12 October	"All About That Bass" ‡	Meghan Trainor	
19 October	"All About That Bass" ‡	Meghan Trainor	
25 October	"All About That Bass" ‡	Meghan Trainor	
1 November	"All About That Bass" ‡	Meghan Trainor	
8 November	"The Days"	Avicii featuring Robbie Williams	
15 November	"Blame"	Calvin Harris featuring John Newman	
22 November	"Blame"	Calvin Harris featuring John Newman	
29 November	"The Days"	Avicii featuring Robbie Williams	
6 December	"Sun Goes Down"	Robin Schulz featuring Jasmine Thompson	
13 December	"Dangerous" ‡	David Guetta featuring Sam Martin	
20 December	"Dangerous" ‡	David Guetta featuring Sam Martin	
27 December	"Dangerous" ‡	David Guetta featuring Sam Martin	
