= List of German airplay number-one songs of 2023 =

The official German Airplay Chart is an airplay chart compiled by Nielsen Music Control on behalf of Bundesverband Musikindustrie (Federal Association of Phonographic Industry).

== Chart history ==
Key
| ‡ | Indicates singles which also reached the top of the German singles chart |

| Issue date | Title | Artist(s) | Ref. |
|---|---|---|---|
| 6 January | "Anti-Hero" | Taylor Swift | |
| 13 January | "Anti-Hero" | Taylor Swift | |
| 20 January | "Anti-Hero" | Taylor Swift | |
| 27 January | "Anti-Hero" | Taylor Swift | |
| 3 February | "10:35" | Tiësto and Tate McRae | |
| 10 February | "10:35" | Tiësto and Tate McRae | |
| 17 February | "10:35" | Tiësto and Tate McRae | |
| 24 February | "Flowers" ‡ | Miley Cyrus | |
| 3 March | "Flowers" ‡ | Miley Cyrus | |
| 10 March | "Flowers" ‡ | Miley Cyrus | |
| 17 March | "Flowers" ‡ | Miley Cyrus | |
| 24 March | "Flowers" ‡ | Miley Cyrus | |
| 31 March | "Flowers" ‡ | Miley Cyrus | |
| 7 April | "Flowers" ‡ | Miley Cyrus | |
| 14 April | "Flowers" ‡ | Miley Cyrus | |
| 21 April | "Flowers" ‡ | Miley Cyrus | |
| 28 April | "Feel Alive" | Kamrad | |
| 5 May | "Trustfall" | Pink | |
| 12 May | "Eyes Closed" | Ed Sheeran | |
| 19 May | "Eyes Closed" | Ed Sheeran | |
| 26 May | "Eyes Closed" | Ed Sheeran | |
| 2 June | "Eyes Closed" | Ed Sheeran | |
| 9 June | "Eyes Closed" | Ed Sheeran | |
| 16 June | "Baby Don't Hurt Me" | David Guetta, Anne-Marie and Coi Leray | |
| 23 June | "Baby Don't Hurt Me" | David Guetta, Anne-Marie and Coi Leray | |
| 30 June | "Baby Don't Hurt Me" | David Guetta, Anne-Marie and Coi Leray | |
| 7 July | "Baby Don't Hurt Me" | David Guetta, Anne-Marie and Coi Leray | |
| 14 July | "Baby Don't Hurt Me" | David Guetta, Anne-Marie and Coi Leray | |
| 21 July | "Baby Don't Hurt Me" | David Guetta, Anne-Marie and Coi Leray | |
| 28 July | "Dance the Night" | Dua Lipa | |
| 4 August | "Dance the Night" | Dua Lipa | |
| 11 August | "Over" | ClockClock | |
| 18 August | "Dance the Night" | Dua Lipa | |
| 25 August | "Dance the Night" | Dua Lipa | |
| 1 September | "Dance the Night" | Dua Lipa | |
| 8 September | "What I Want" | Lena | |
| 15 September | "Cynical" | Twocolors, Safri Duo and Chris De Sarandy | |
| 22 September | "Cynical" | Twocolors, Safri Duo and Chris De Sarandy | |
| 29 September | "Cynical" | Twocolors, Safri Duo and Chris De Sarandy | |
| 6 October | "Cynical" | Twocolors, Safri Duo and Chris De Sarandy | |
| 13 October | "Cruel Summer" | Taylor Swift | |
| 20 October | "Cruel Summer" | Taylor Swift | |
| 27 October | "Cruel Summer" | Taylor Swift | |
| 3 November | "Cruel Summer" | Taylor Swift | |
| 10 November | "Lifeline" | Glockenbach/Ella Henderson | |
| 17 November | "Single Soon" | Selena Gomez | |
| 24 November | "Greedy" | Tate McRae | |
| 1 December | "Strangers" | Kenya Grace | |
| 8 December | "Strangers" | Kenya Grace | |
| 15 December | "Strangers" | Kenya Grace | |
| 22 December | "I'll Be There" | Robin Schulz, Rita Ora and Tiago PZK | |
| 29 December | "Houdini" | Dua Lipa | |
