= List of German airplay number-one songs of 2025 =

The Official German Airplay Chart is an airplay chart compiled by MusicTrace on behalf of Bundesverband Musikindustrie (Federal Association of Phonographic Industry).

== Chart history ==
Key
| ‡ | Indicates singles which also reached the top of the German singles chart |

| Issue date | Title | Artist(s) | Ref. |
|---|---|---|---|
| 3 January | "Forever Young" | David Guetta, Alphaville and Ava Max | |
| 10 January | "Forever Young" | David Guetta, Alphaville and Ava Max | |
| 17 January | "Forever Young" | David Guetta, Alphaville and Ava Max | |
| 24 January | "Forever Young" | David Guetta, Alphaville and Ava Max | |
| 31 January | "Rock N Roll" | Leony and G-Eazy | |
| 7 February | "That's So True" | Gracie Abrams | |
| 14 February | "That's So True" | Gracie Abrams | |
| 21 February | "That's So True" | Gracie Abrams | |
| 28 February | "Touch Me" | Ásdís | |
| 7 March | "Touch Me" | Ásdís | |
| 14 March | "By Your Side (In My Mind)" | Leony | |
| 21 March | "By Your Side (In My Mind)" | Leony | |
| 28 March | "By Your Side (In My Mind)" | Leony | |
| 4 April | "By Your Side (In My Mind)" | Leony | |
| 11 April | "By Your Side (In My Mind)" | Leony | |
| 18 April | "By Your Side (In My Mind)" | Leony | |
| 25 April | "Abracadabra" | Lady Gaga | |
| 2 May | "Azizam" | Ed Sheeran | |
| 9 May | "Azizam" | Ed Sheeran | |
| 16 May | "Azizam" | Ed Sheeran | |
| 23 May | "Azizam" | Ed Sheeran | |
| 30 May | "Azizam" | Ed Sheeran | |
| 6 June | "Azizam" | Ed Sheeran | |
| 13 June | "Azizam" | Ed Sheeran | |
| 20 June | "Azizam" | Ed Sheeran | |
| 27 June | "Azizam" | Ed Sheeran | |
| 4 July | "Azizam" | Ed Sheeran | |
| 11 July | "Azizam" | Ed Sheeran | |
| 18 July | "Be Mine" | Kamrad | |
| 25 July | "Be Mine" | Kamrad | |
| 1 August | "Be Mine" | Kamrad | |
| 8 August | "Be Mine" | Kamrad | |
| 15 August | "Be Mine" | Kamrad | |
| 22 August | "Be Mine" | Kamrad | |
| 29 August | "Sapphire" | Ed Sheeran | |
| 5 September | "Sapphire" | Ed Sheeran | |
| 12 September | "Sapphire" | Ed Sheeran | |
| 19 September | "Adore Ya" | ClockClock | |
| 26 September | "Adore Ya" | ClockClock | |
| 10 October | "Home" | Glockenbach and Tom Walker | |
| 17 October | "Home" | Glockenbach and Tom Walker | |
| 24 October | "The Dead Dance" | Lady Gaga | |
| 31 October | "The Dead Dance" | Lady Gaga | |
| 7 November | "The Dead Dance" | Lady Gaga | |
| 14 November | "The Fate of Ophelia"‡ | Taylor Swift | |
| 21 November | "The Fate of Ophelia"‡ | Taylor Swift | |
| 28 November | "The Fate of Ophelia"‡ | Taylor Swift | |
| 5 December | "The Fate of Ophelia"‡ | Taylor Swift | |
| 12 December | "The Fate of Ophelia"‡ | Taylor Swift | |
| 19 December | "The Fate of Ophelia"‡ | Taylor Swift | |
| 26 December | "The Fate of Ophelia"‡ | Taylor Swift | |
