= List of German airplay number-one songs of 2016 =

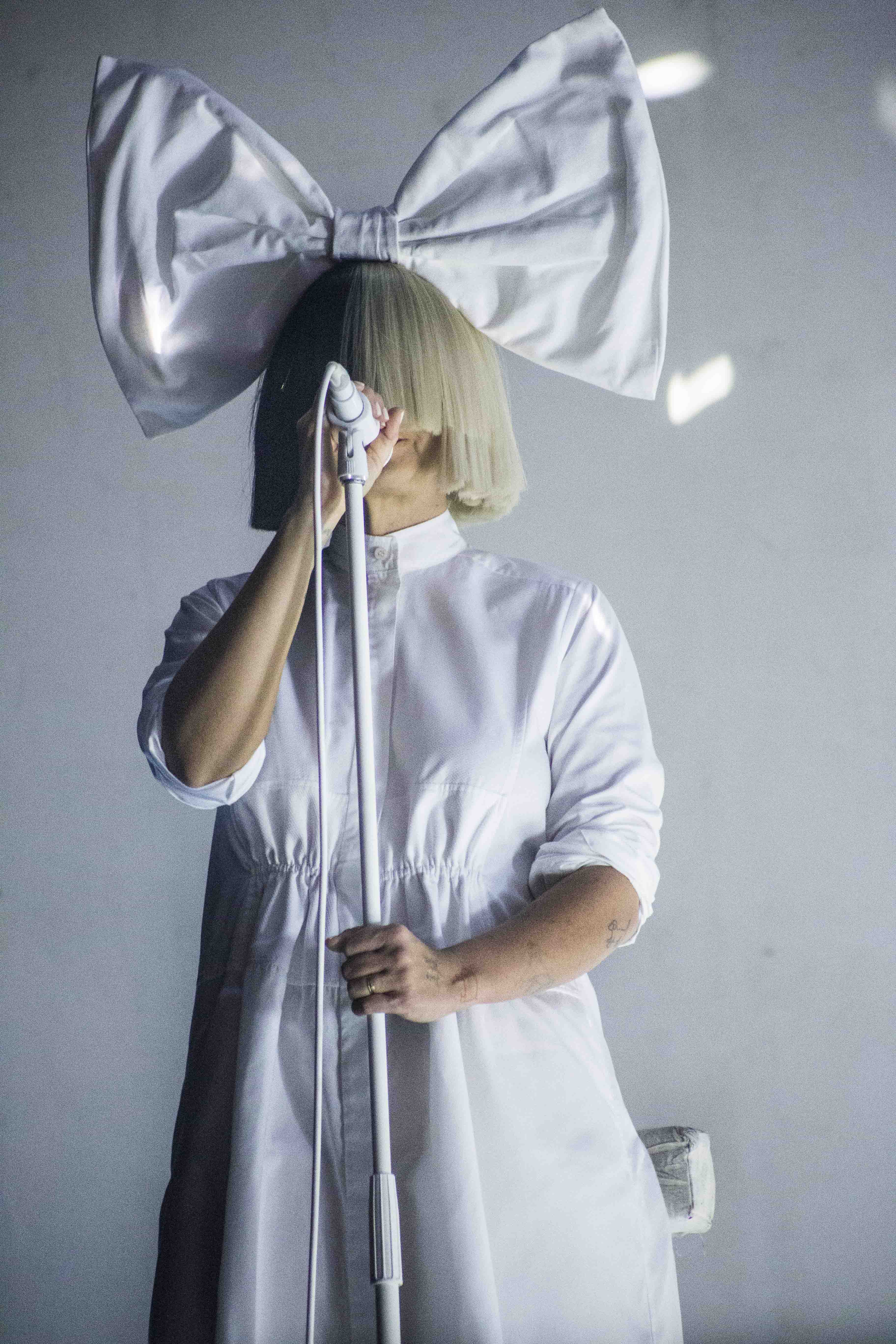
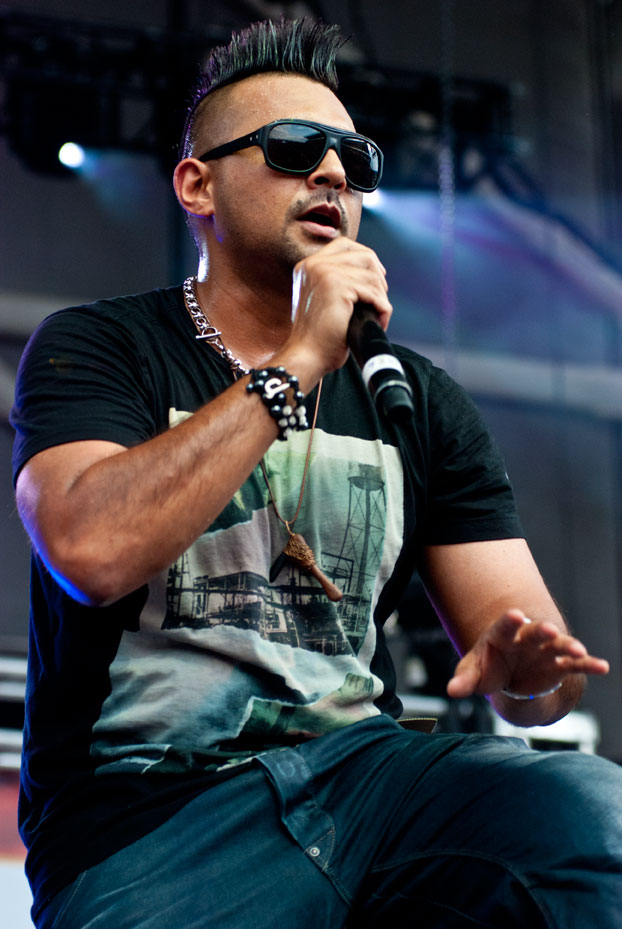
Sia (pictured in 2016; left) and Sean Paul's (pictured in 2012; right) "Cheap Thrills" was the best-performing song of the year.

The official German airplay chart ranks the most frequently broadcast songs on German radio stations. In 2016, 20 different songs reached the top, based on weekly airplay data compiled by MusicTrace on behalf of Bundesverband Musikindustrie (BVMI). The radio stations are chosen based on the reach of each station. A specific number of evaluated stations is not given.

== Chart history ==
Key
†	Indicates best-performing single of 2016
‡	Indicates singles which also reached the top of the German single chart

Issue date	Title	Artist(s)	Ref.
1 January	"Hello" ‡	Adele	
8 January	"Hello" ‡	Adele	
15 January	"Show Me Love"	Robin Schulz and J.U.D.G.E.	
22 January	"Show Me Love"	Robin Schulz and J.U.D.G.E.	
29 January	"Show Me Love"	Robin Schulz and J.U.D.G.E.	
5 February	"Stimme" ‡	EFF	
12 February	"Stimme" ‡	EFF	
19 February	"Something in the Way You Move"	Ellie Goulding	
26 February	"Something in the Way You Move"	Ellie Goulding	
4 March	"Something in the Way You Move"	Ellie Goulding	
11 March	"Love Yourself"	Justin Bieber	
18 March	"Love Yourself"	Justin Bieber	
25 March	"Love Yourself"	Justin Bieber	
1 April	"Faded" ‡	Alan Walker	
8 April	"Faded" ‡	Alan Walker	
15 April	"Home"	Topic featuring Nico Santos	
22 April	"Cheap Thrills" † ‡	Sia featuring Sean Paul	
29 April	"Cheap Thrills" † ‡	Sia featuring Sean Paul	
6 May	"Cake by the Ocean"	DNCE	
13 May	"Cake by the Ocean"	DNCE	
20 May	"Cake by the Ocean"	DNCE	
27 May	"Wir sind groß"	Mark Forster	
3 June	"Can't Stop the Feeling!" ‡	Justin Timberlake	
10 June	"Can't Stop the Feeling!" ‡	Justin Timberlake	
17 June	"Can't Stop the Feeling!" ‡	Justin Timberlake	
24 June	"Can't Stop the Feeling!" ‡	Justin Timberlake	
1 July	"Can't Stop the Feeling!" ‡	Justin Timberlake	
8 July	"Can't Stop the Feeling!" ‡	Justin Timberlake	
15 July	"Can't Stop the Feeling!" ‡	Justin Timberlake	
22 July	"Can't Stop the Feeling!" ‡	Justin Timberlake	
29 July	"If I Were Sorry"	Frans	
5 August	"Treat You Better"	Shawn Mendes	
12 August	"Treat You Better"	Shawn Mendes	
19 August	"Treat You Better"	Shawn Mendes	
26 August	"Bonfire"	Felix Jaehn featuring Alma	
2 September	"Bonfire"	Felix Jaehn featuring Alma	
9 September	"The Ocean"	Mike Perry featuring Shy Martin	
16 September	"Bonfire"	Felix Jaehn featuring Alma	
23 September	"Bonfire"	Felix Jaehn featuring Alma	
30 September	"Human" ‡	Rag'n'Bone Man	
7 October	"Human" ‡	Rag'n'Bone Man	
14 October	"Human" ‡	Rag'n'Bone Man	
21 October	"The Greatest"	Sia featuring Kendrick Lamar	
28 October	"The Greatest"	Sia featuring Kendrick Lamar	
4 November	"The Greatest"	Sia featuring Kendrick Lamar	
11 November	"The Greatest"	Sia featuring Kendrick Lamar	
18 November	"My Way"	Calvin Harris	
25 November	"My Way"	Calvin Harris	
2 December	"My Way"	Calvin Harris	
9 December	"Would I Lie to You"	David Guetta, Cedric Gervais and Chris Willis	
16 December	"Rockabye" ‡	Clean Bandit featuring Sean Paul and Anne-Marie	
23 December	"Rockabye" ‡	Clean Bandit featuring Sean Paul and Anne-Marie	
30 December	"Rockabye" ‡	Clean Bandit featuring Sean Paul and Anne-Marie	
