= List of German airplay number-one songs of 2019 =

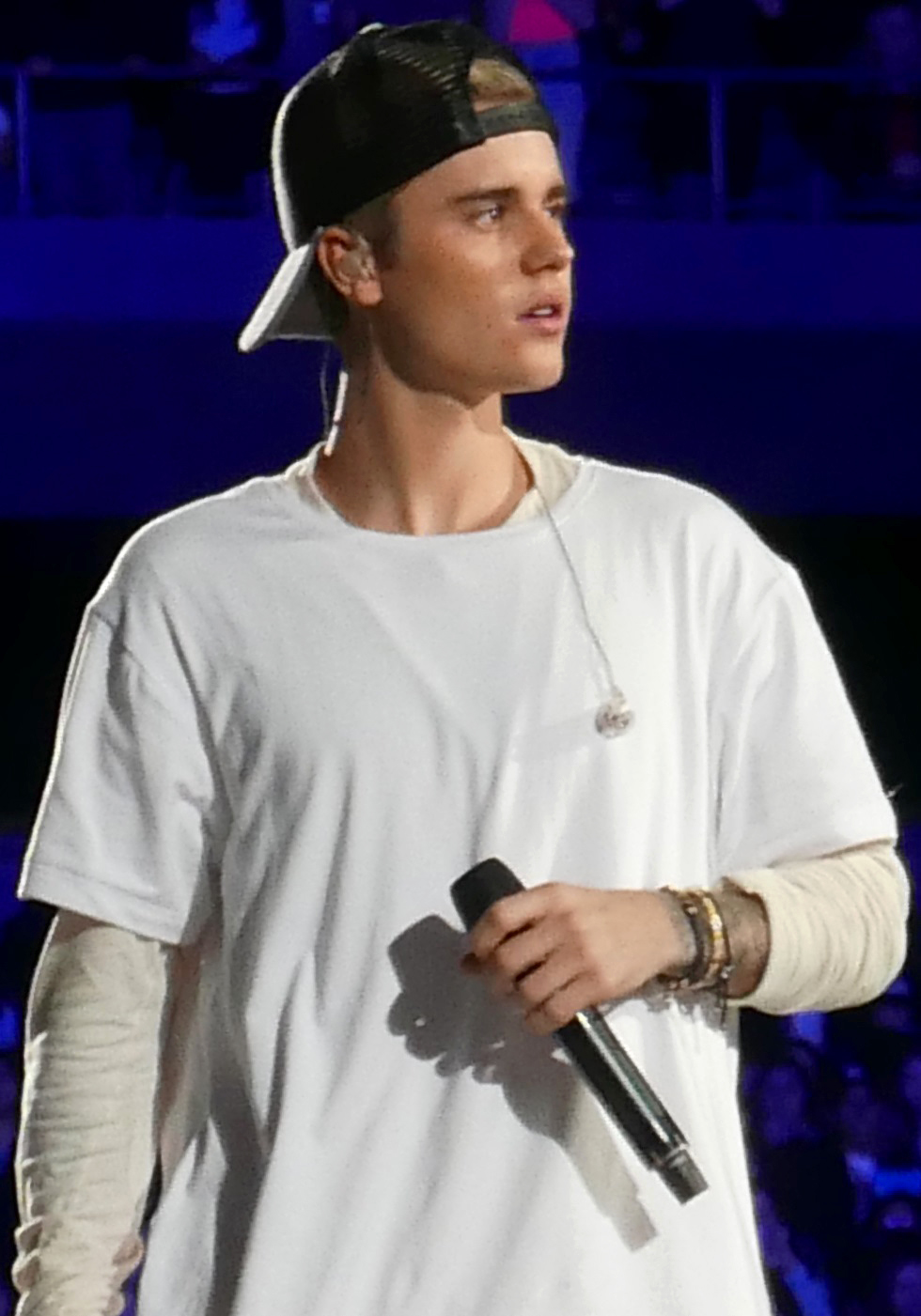
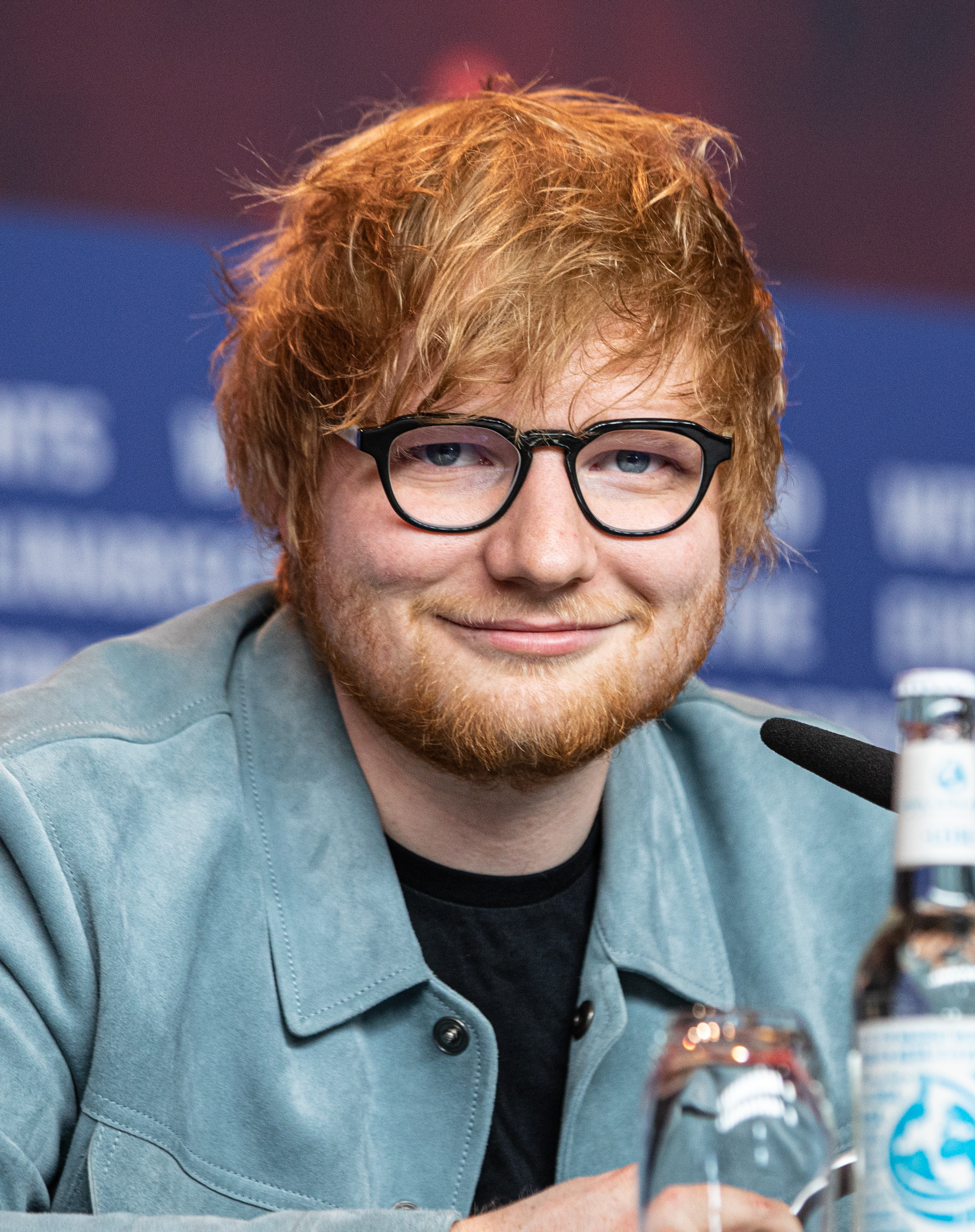
Ed Sheeran and Justin Bieber's (pictured in 2015) "I Don't Care" was the best-performing song of the year.

The official German airplay chart ranks the most frequently broadcast songs on German radio stations. In 2019, 19 different songs reached the top, based on weekly airplay data compiled by MusicTrace on behalf of Bundesverband Musikindustrie (BVMI). The radio stations are chosen based on the reach of each station. A specific number of evaluated stations is not given.

== Chart history ==
Key
†	Indicates best-performing single of 2019
‡	Indicates singles which also reached the top of the German singles chart

Issue date	Title	Artist(s)	Ref.
4 January	"Sweet but Psycho"	Ava Max	
11 January	"Fading"	Alle Farben and Ilira	
18 January	"Fading"	Alle Farben and Ilira	
25 January	"Fading"	Alle Farben and Ilira	
1 February	"Fading"	Alle Farben and Ilira	
8 February	"Nothing Breaks Like a Heart"	Mark Ronson featuring Miley Cyrus	
15 February	"Power Over Me"	Dermot Kennedy	
22 February	"Power Over Me"	Dermot Kennedy	
1 March	"Nothing Breaks Like a Heart"	Mark Ronson featuring Miley Cyrus	
8 March	"Giant"	Calvin Harris and Rag'n'Bone Man	
15 March	"Giant"	Calvin Harris and Rag'n'Bone Man	
22 March	"Giant"	Calvin Harris and Rag'n'Bone Man	
29 March	"Giant"	Calvin Harris and Rag'n'Bone Man	
5 April	"Bad Liar"	Imagine Dragons	
12 April	"Bad Liar"	Imagine Dragons	
19 April	"Bad Liar"	Imagine Dragons	
26 April	"Bad Liar"	Imagine Dragons	
3 May	"Don't Call Me Up"	Mabel	
10 May	"Con Calma"	Daddy Yankee featuring Snow	
17 May	"So Am I"	Ava Max	
24 May	"So Am I"	Ava Max	
31 May	"So Am I"	Ava Max	
7 June	"So Am I"	Ava Max	
14 June	"I Don't Care"	Ed Sheeran and Justin Bieber	
21 June	"I Don't Care"	Ed Sheeran and Justin Bieber	
28 June	"I Don't Care"	Ed Sheeran and Justin Bieber	
5 July	"I Don't Care"	Ed Sheeran and Justin Bieber	
12 July	"I Don't Care"	Ed Sheeran and Justin Bieber	
19 July	"I Don't Care"	Ed Sheeran and Justin Bieber	
26 July	"I Don't Care"	Ed Sheeran and Justin Bieber	
2 August	"I Don't Care"	Ed Sheeran and Justin Bieber	
9 August	"Señorita"	Shawn Mendes and Camila Cabello	
16 August	"Señorita"	Shawn Mendes and Camila Cabello	
23 August	"Señorita"	Shawn Mendes and Camila Cabello	
30 August	"Señorita"	Shawn Mendes and Camila Cabello	
6 September	"Señorita"	Shawn Mendes and Camila Cabello	
13 September	"Señorita"	Shawn Mendes and Camila Cabello	
20 September	"Señorita"	Shawn Mendes and Camila Cabello	
27 September	"Higher Love"	Kygo and Whitney Houston	
4 October	"Better"	Lena and Nico Santos	
11 October	"Better"	Lena and Nico Santos	
18 October	"Better"	Lena and Nico Santos	
25 October	"Dance Monkey"	Tones and I	
1 November	"Dance Monkey"	Tones and I	
8 November	"Dance Monkey"	Tones and I	
15 November	"Dance Monkey"	Tones and I	
22 November	"Circles"	Post Malone	
29 November	"Circles"	Post Malone	
6 December	"Ride It"	Regard	
13 December	"Ride It"	Regard	
20 December	"Stack It Up"	Liam Payne featuring A Boogie wit da Hoodie	
27 December	"Don't Start Now"	Dua Lipa	
