= List of German airplay number-one songs of 2013 =

The official German airplay chart ranks the most frequently broadcast songs on German radio stations. In 2013, 17 different songs reached the top, based on weekly airplay data compiled by MusicTrace on behalf of Bundesverband Musikindustrie (BVMI). The radio stations are chosen based on the reach of each station. A specific number of evaluated stations is not given.

== Chart history ==
Key
†	Indicates best-performing single of 2013
‡	Indicates singles which also reached the top of the German single chart

Issue date	Title	Artist(s)	Ref.
6 January	"Diamonds" ‡	Rihanna	
13 January	"Everything at Once"	Lenka	
20 January	"Everything at Once"	Lenka	
27 January	"Everything at Once"	Lenka	
3 February	"Troublemaker"	Olly Murs featuring Flo Rida	
10 February	"Troublemaker"	Olly Murs featuring Flo Rida	
17 February	"Troublemaker"	Olly Murs featuring Flo Rida	
24 February	"Lights"	Ellie Goulding	
3 March	"Stay"	Rihanna featuring Mikky Ekko	
10 March	"Stay"	Rihanna featuring Mikky Ekko	
17 March	"Stay"	Rihanna featuring Mikky Ekko	
24 March	"Let Her Go" ‡	Passenger	
31 March	"Let Her Go" ‡	Passenger	
7 April	"Mirrors"	Justin Timberlake	
14 April	"Mirrors"	Justin Timberlake	
21 April	"Mirrors"	Justin Timberlake	
28 April	"Mirrors"	Justin Timberlake	
5 May	"Mirrors"	Justin Timberlake	
12 May	"Just Give Me a Reason" ‡	Pink featuring Nate Ruess	
19 May	"Safe and Sound" ‡	Capital Cities	
26 May	"Safe and Sound" ‡	Capital Cities	
2 June	"Safe and Sound" ‡	Capital Cities	
9 June	"Safe and Sound" ‡	Capital Cities	
16 June	"Safe and Sound" ‡	Capital Cities	
23 June	"Safe and Sound" ‡	Capital Cities	
30 June	"Get Lucky" ‡	Daft Punk featuring Pharrell Williams	
7 July	"Get Lucky" ‡	Daft Punk featuring Pharrell Williams	
14 July	"Wake Me Up" ‡	Avicii featuring Aloe Blacc	
21 July	"Wake Me Up" ‡	Avicii featuring Aloe Blacc	
28 July	"Wake Me Up" ‡	Avicii featuring Aloe Blacc	
4 August	"Wake Me Up" ‡	Avicii featuring Aloe Blacc	
11 August	"Wake Me Up" ‡	Avicii featuring Aloe Blacc	
18 August	"Wake Me Up" ‡	Avicii featuring Aloe Blacc	
25 August	"Wake Me Up" ‡	Avicii featuring Aloe Blacc	
1 September	"Wake Me Up" ‡	Avicii featuring Aloe Blacc	
8 September	"Roar"	Katy Perry	
15 September	"Roar"	Katy Perry	
22 September	"Roar"	Katy Perry	
29 September	"Roar"	Katy Perry	
6 October	"Roar"	Katy Perry	
13 October	"Roar"	Katy Perry	
20 October	"Roar"	Katy Perry	
27 October	"Roar"	Katy Perry	
3 November	"Hey Brother" ‡	Avicii featuring Dan Tyminski	
10 November	"Jubel" ‡	Klingande	
17 November	"Jubel" ‡	Klingande	
24 November	"Hey Brother" ‡	Avicii featuring Dan Tyminski	
1 December	"Hey Brother" ‡	Avicii featuring Dan Tyminski	
8 December	"Hey Brother" ‡	Avicii featuring Dan Tyminski	
15 December	"Lieder"	Adel Tawil	
22 December	"Timber" ‡	Pitbull featuring Kesha	
29 December	"Changes" ‡	Faul & Wad Ad vs. Pnau	
