= List of German airplay number-one songs of 2018 =

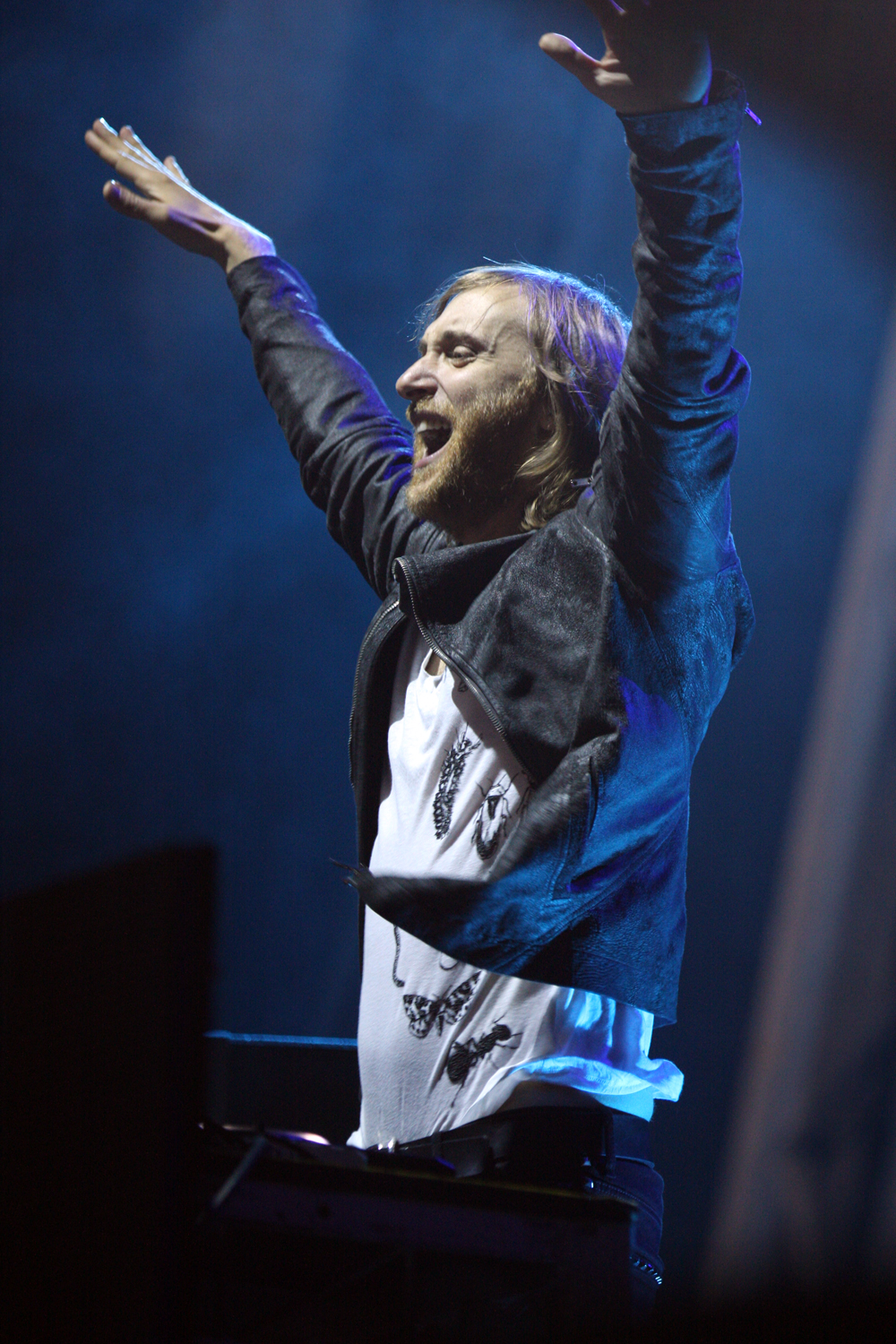
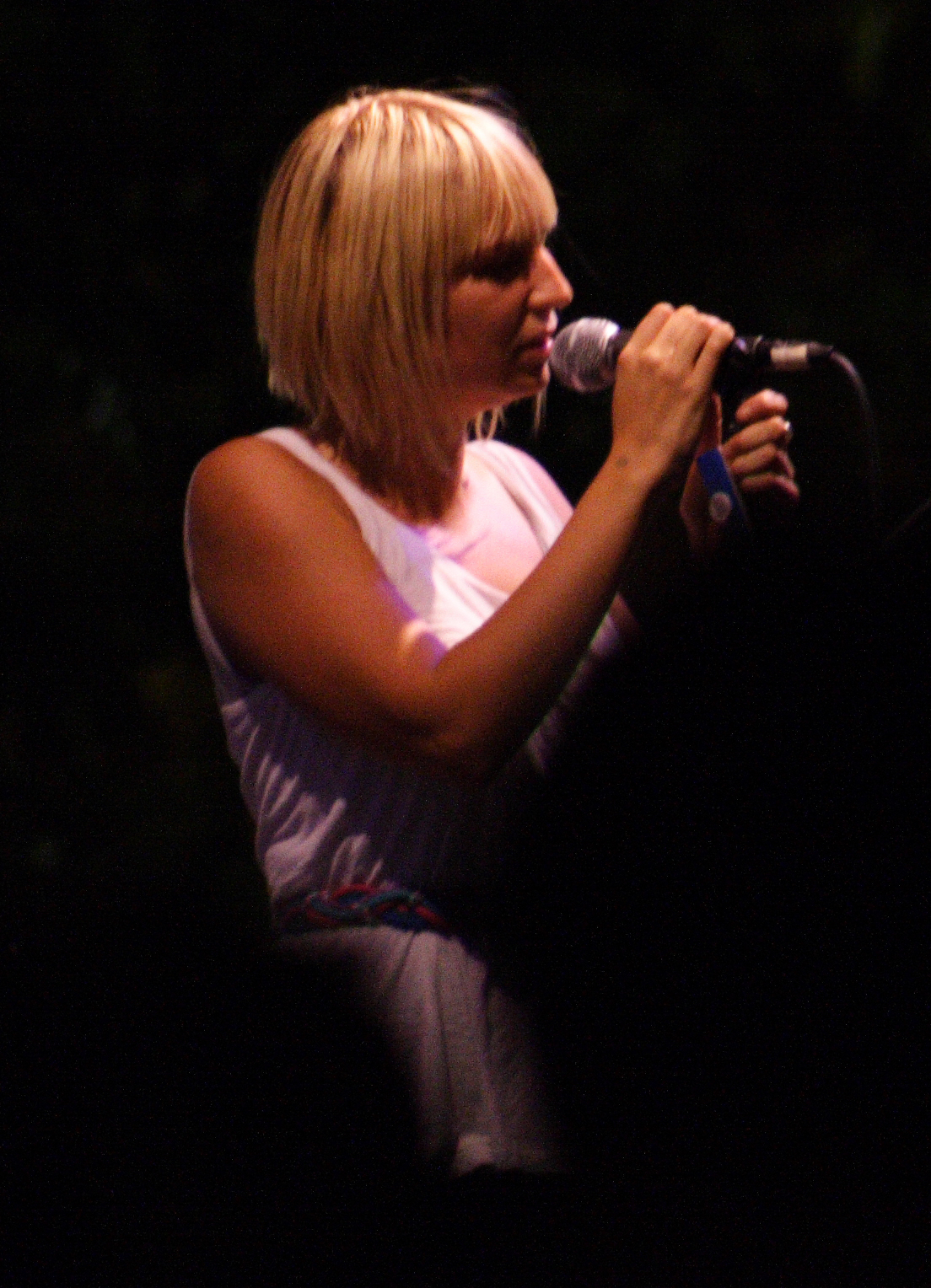
David Guetta's (pictured in 2012; left) and Sia's (pictured in 2006; right) "Flames" spent eight consecutive weeks atop the chart and was the best-performing song of the year.

The official German airplay chart ranks the most frequently broadcast songs on German radio stations. In 2018, 19 different songs reached the top, based on weekly airplay data compiled by MusicTrace on behalf of Bundesverband Musikindustrie (BVMI). The radio stations are chosen based on the reach of each station. A specific number of evaluated stations is not given.

Felix Jaehn's collaboration "Like a Riddle" with Hearts and Colours & Adam Trigger was the first number one of the year. It was replaced the following week by P!nk's "Beautiful Trauma". Lost Frequencies' & Zonderling's "Crazy" dethroned P!nk after her two-week reign and topped the chart for the following five weeks. "Flames", released in March, by French DJ David Guetta and Australian singer Sia reached the top on 11 May. After eight consecutive weeks atop, it was replaced by Calvin Harris' and Dua Lipa's "One Kiss" on 29 June, which was the second best-performing song of the year and was played more than 48,000 times within 2018. Namika's "Je ne parle pas français (Beatgees Remix)", featuring Black M, was the only German and French song atop the chart in 2018 and was played 35,000 times on evaluated stations. Nico Santos' "Safe" and Alle Farben, Kelvin Jones & Younotus "Only Thing We Know" topped the chart for four weeks each in the summer.

Calvin Harris' song "Promises", alongside English singer Sam Smith, was his second song to top the chart and the second to hold the position for eight consecutive weeks in 2018. The final number one of 2018 was "Sweet but Psycho" by American singer Ava Max which topped the chart for the last three weeks of the year. The best-performing single of the year was "Flames" by David Guetta and Sia.

== Chart history ==
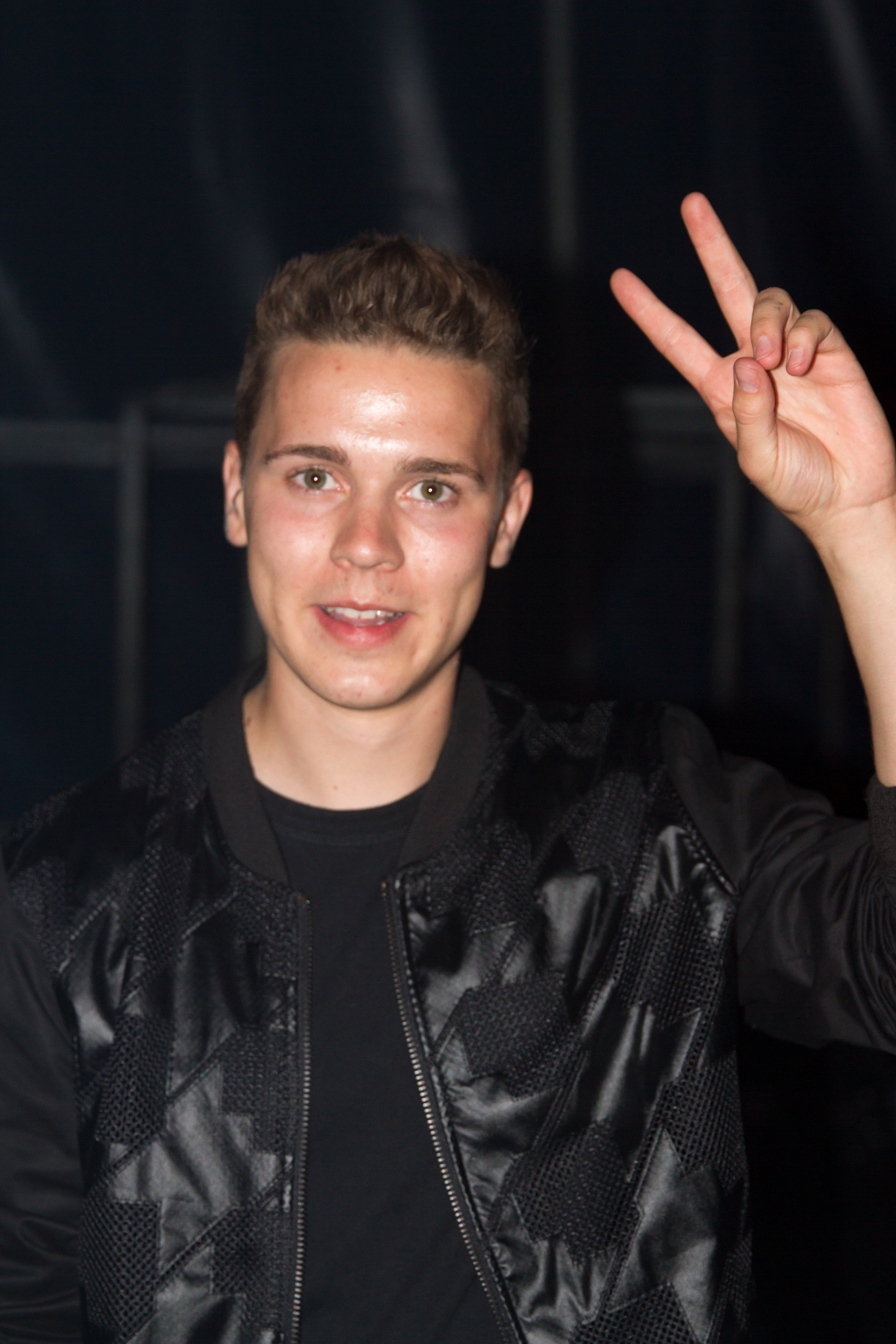
German DJ Felix Jaehn (pictured in 2015) produced the two number-one songs "Like a Riddle" and "Cool" and is credited as the lead artist.

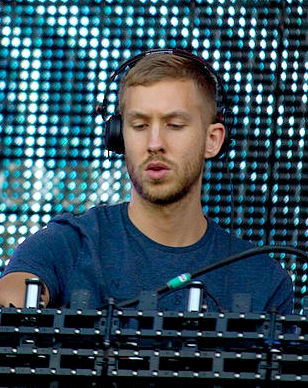
Calvin Harris (pictured in 2012) songs "One Kiss" and "Promises" spent a total of nine weeks atop the chart.

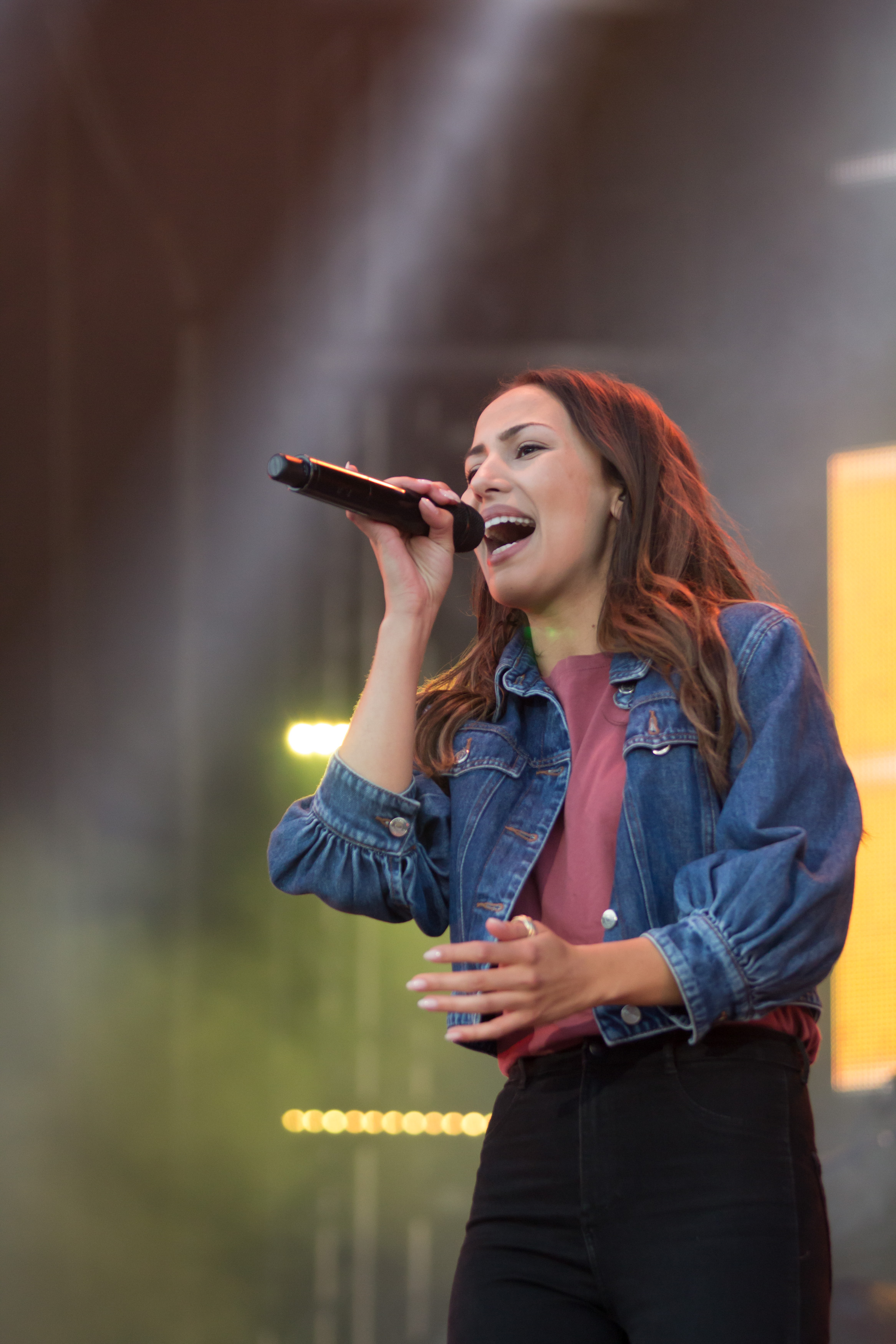
German singer Namika (pictured in 2018) had the only German and French song atop the chart in 2018. The remix of her song "Je ne parle pas français" by Beatgees, featuring Black M, topped the chart on 13 July.

Key
†	Indicates best-performing single of 2018
‡	Indicates singles which also reached the top of the German singles chart

Issue date	Title	Artist(s)	Ref.
5 January	"Like a Riddle"	Felix Jaehn featuring Hearts and Colours & Adam Trigger	
12 January	"Beautiful Trauma"	Pink	
19 January	"Beautiful Trauma"	Pink	
26 January	"Crazy"	Lost Frequencies & Zonderling	
2 February	"Crazy"	Lost Frequencies & Zonderling	
9 February	"Crazy"	Lost Frequencies & Zonderling	
16 February	"Crazy"	Lost Frequencies & Zonderling	
23 February	"Crazy"	Lost Frequencies & Zonderling	
2 March	"For You" ‡	Liam Payne and Rita Ora	
9 March	"For You" ‡	Liam Payne and Rita Ora	
16 March	"For You" ‡	Liam Payne and Rita Ora	
23 March	"Say Something"	Justin Timberlake featuring Chris Stapleton	
30 March	"For You" ‡	Liam Payne & Rita Ora	
6 April	"Say Something"	Justin Timberlake featuring Chris Stapleton	
13 April	"Unforgettable"	Robin Schulz & Marc Scibilia	
20 April	"Unforgettable"	Robin Schulz & Marc Scibilia	
27 April	"These Days"	Rudimental featuring Jess Glynne, Macklemore & Dan Caplen	
4 May	"Cool"	Felix Jaehn featuring Marc E. Bassy & Gucci Mane	
11 May	"Flames" †	David Guetta and Sia	
18 May	"Flames" †	David Guetta and Sia	
25 May	"Flames" †	David Guetta and Sia	
1 June	"Flames" †	David Guetta and Sia	
8 June	"Flames" †	David Guetta and Sia	
15 June	"Flames" †	David Guetta and Sia	
22 June	"Flames" †	David Guetta and Sia	
29 June	"Flames" †	David Guetta and Sia	
6 July	"One Kiss" ‡	Calvin Harris & Dua Lipa	
13 July	"Je ne parle pas français (Beatgees Remix)" ‡	Namika	
20 July	"Safe"	Nico Santos	
27 July	"Safe"	Nico Santos	
3 August	"Safe"	Nico Santos	
10 August	"Safe"	Nico Santos	
17 August	"Only Thing We Know"	Alle Farben, Kelvin Jones & YOUNOTUS	
24 August	"Only Thing We Know"	Alle Farben, Kelvin Jones & YOUNOTUS	
31 August	"Only Thing We Know"	Alle Farben, Kelvin Jones & YOUNOTUS	
7 September	"Only Thing We Know"	Alle Farben, Kelvin Jones & YOUNOTUS	
14 September	"Shotgun"	George Ezra	
21 September	"Oh Child"	Robin Schulz & Piso 21	
28 September	"Promises"	Calvin Harris & Sam Smith	
5 October	"Promises"	Calvin Harris & Sam Smith	
12 October	"Promises"	Calvin Harris & Sam Smith	
19 October	"Promises"	Calvin Harris & Sam Smith	
26 October	"Promises"	Calvin Harris & Sam Smith	
2 November	"Promises"	Calvin Harris & Sam Smith	
9 November	"Promises"	Calvin Harris & Sam Smith	
16 November	"Promises"	Calvin Harris & Sam Smith	
23 November	"Let You Love Me"	Rita Ora	
30 November	"Let You Love Me"	Rita Ora	
7 December	"Let You Love Me"	Rita Ora	
14 December	"Sweet But Psycho" ‡	Ava Max	
21 December	"Sweet But Psycho" ‡	Ava Max	
28 December	"Sweet But Psycho" ‡	Ava Max	
