= List of German airplay number-one songs of 2017 =

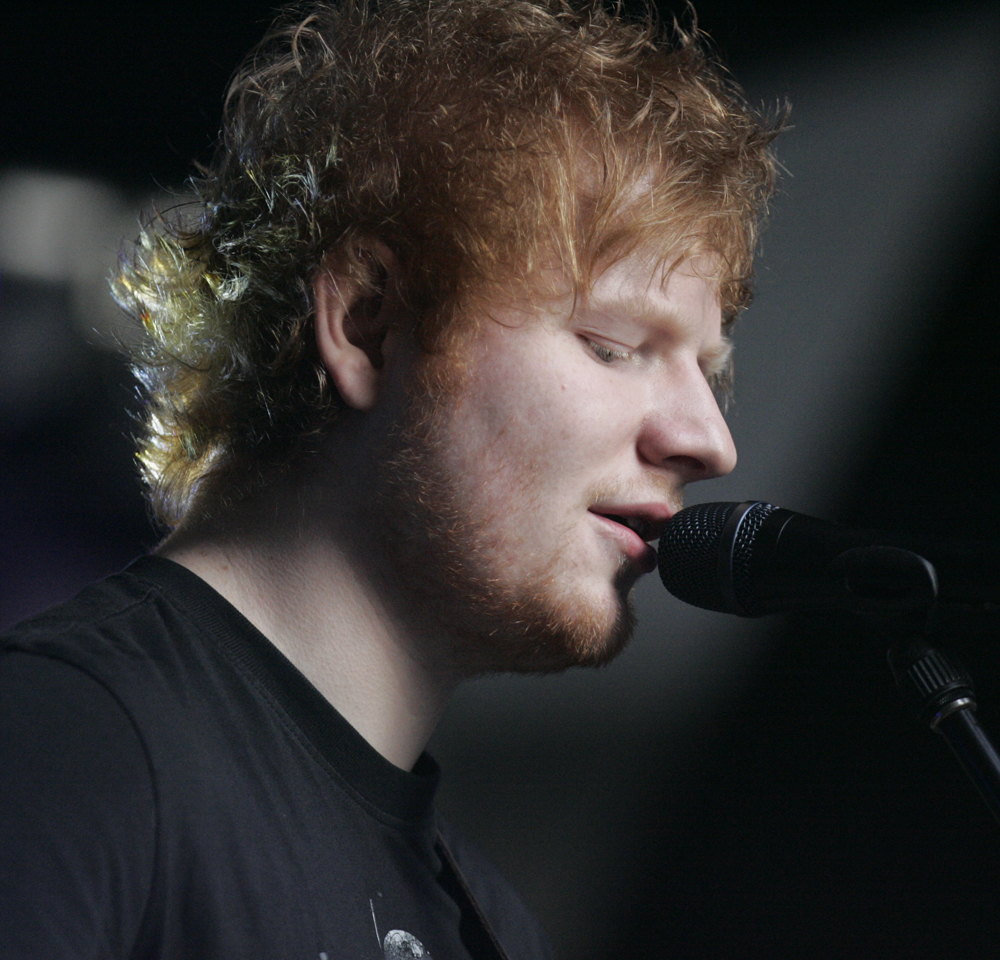
Ed Sheeran's (pictured in 2013) "Shape of You" spent seven consecutive weeks atop the chart and was the best-performing song of the year. Furthermore, two other songs by Sheeran topped the chart for a total of 11 weeks.

The official German airplay chart ranks the most frequently broadcast songs on German radio stations. In 2017, 19 different songs reached the top, based on weekly airplay data compiled by MusicTrace on behalf of Bundesverband Musikindustrie (BVMI). The radio stations are chosen based on the reach of each station. A specific number of evaluated stations is not given.

Clean Bandit's collaboration "Rockabye" with Jamaican singer and rapper Sean Paul and English singer Anne-Marie was the first song to top the chart in 2017. After two weeks, the single was replaced by "Never Give Up" by Sia. Ed Sheeran's "Shape of You", released in January, reached the number one on 10 February and stayed atop for eight consecutive weeks. The first song by a German artist to top the chart was "Little Hollywood" by DJ Alle Farben and Dutch singer Janieck Devy for four weeks in May and June. "OK" by German DJ Robin Schulz featuring James Blunt, topped the chart for the entirety of August. Pink's "What About Us" was the third longest reigning song of 2017, with five consecutive weeks in September and October. Zayn's "Dusk Till Dawn" featuring Sia, replaced P!nk on issue date 27 October and became the second longest reigning song with six consecutive weeks.

The year concluded with "Perfect" by Sheeran, which topped the chart in the last three weeks. The best-performing single of the year was "Shape of You" by Ed Sheeran. Alongside "Galway Girl" and "Perfect", Sheeran's songs have been played more than 160,000 times on evaluated stations.

== Chart history ==
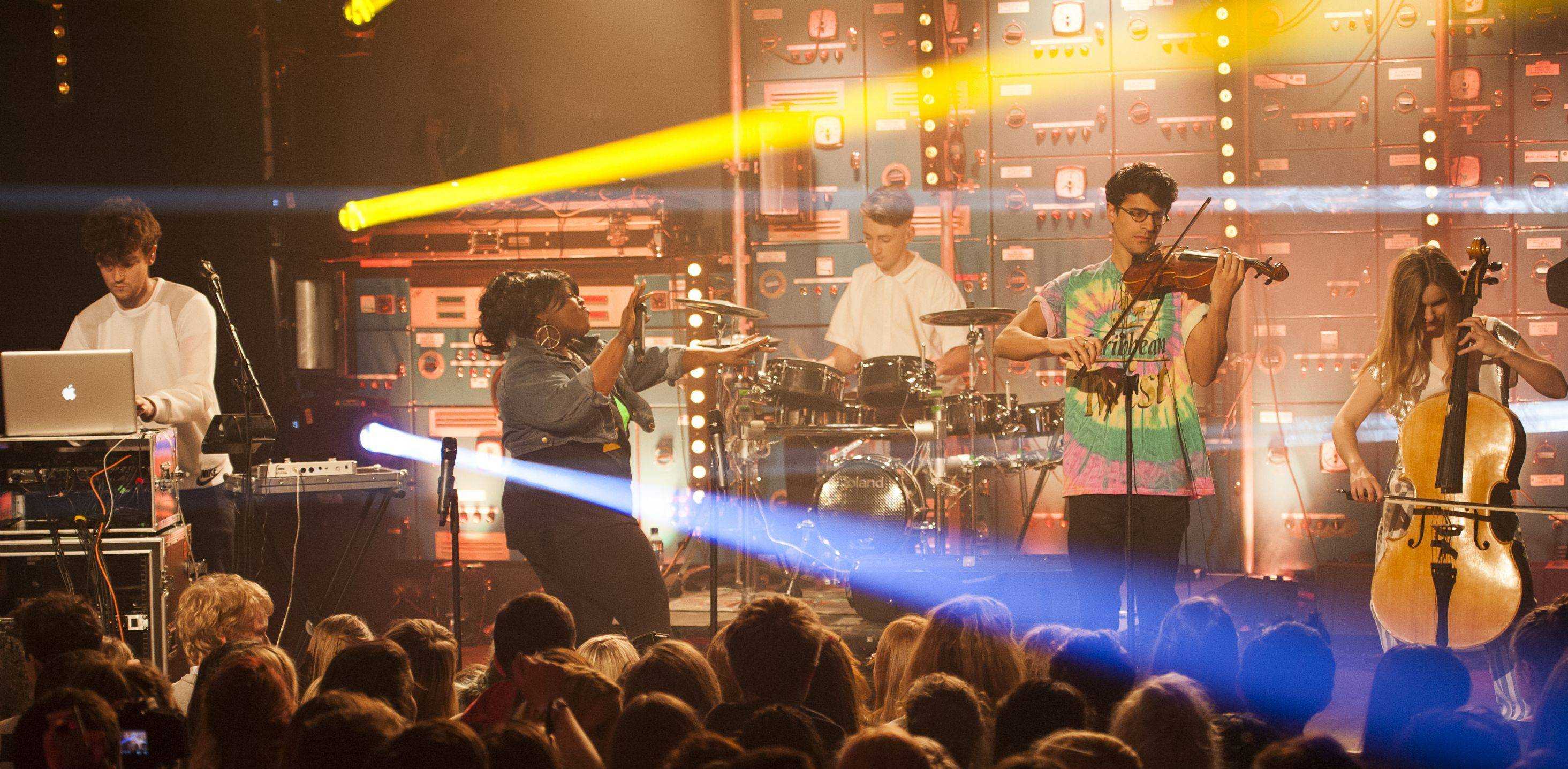
Clean Bandit's (pictured in 2013) collaboration "Rockabye" with Sean Paul & Anne-Marie was the first song to top the chart in 2017 for two weeks.

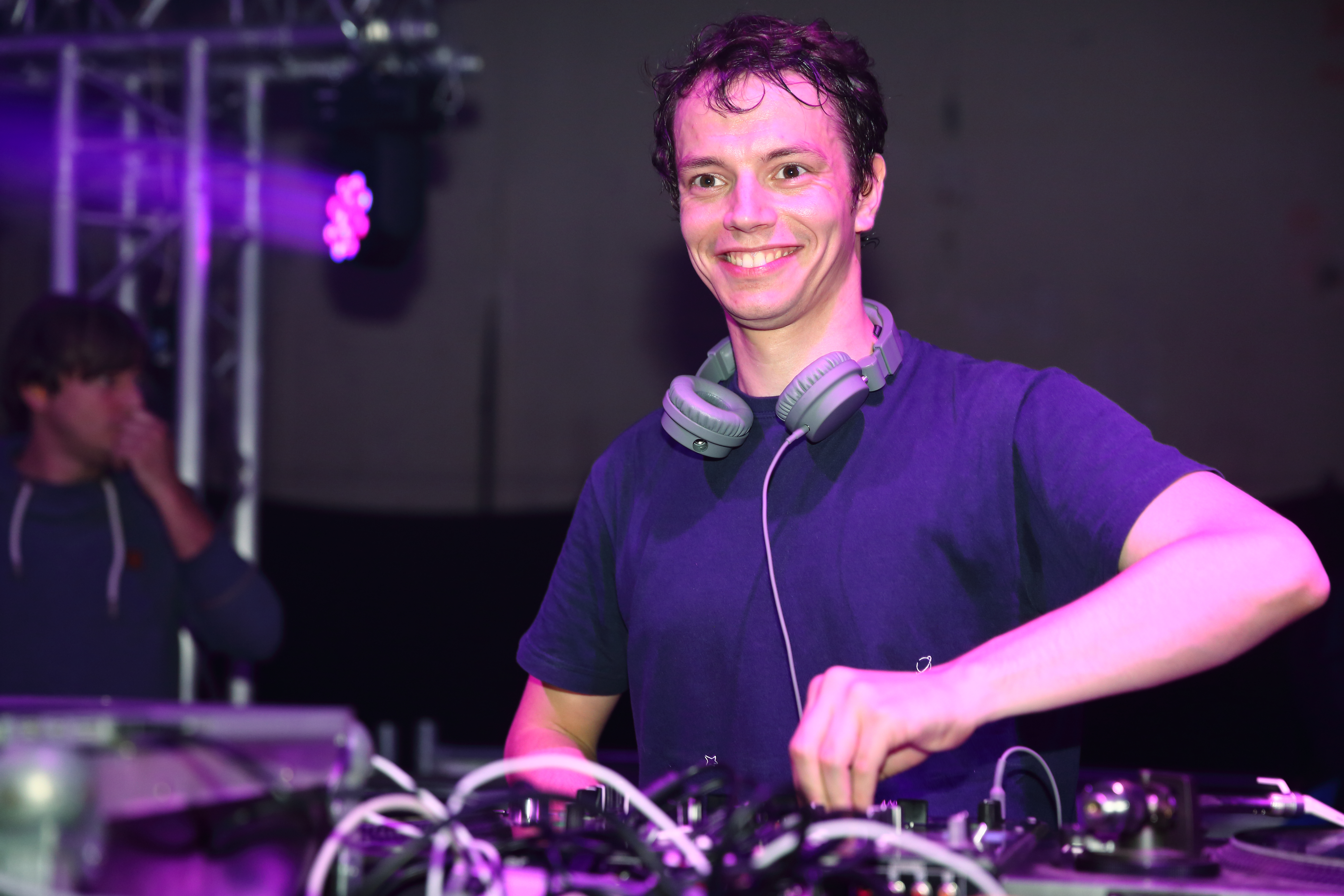
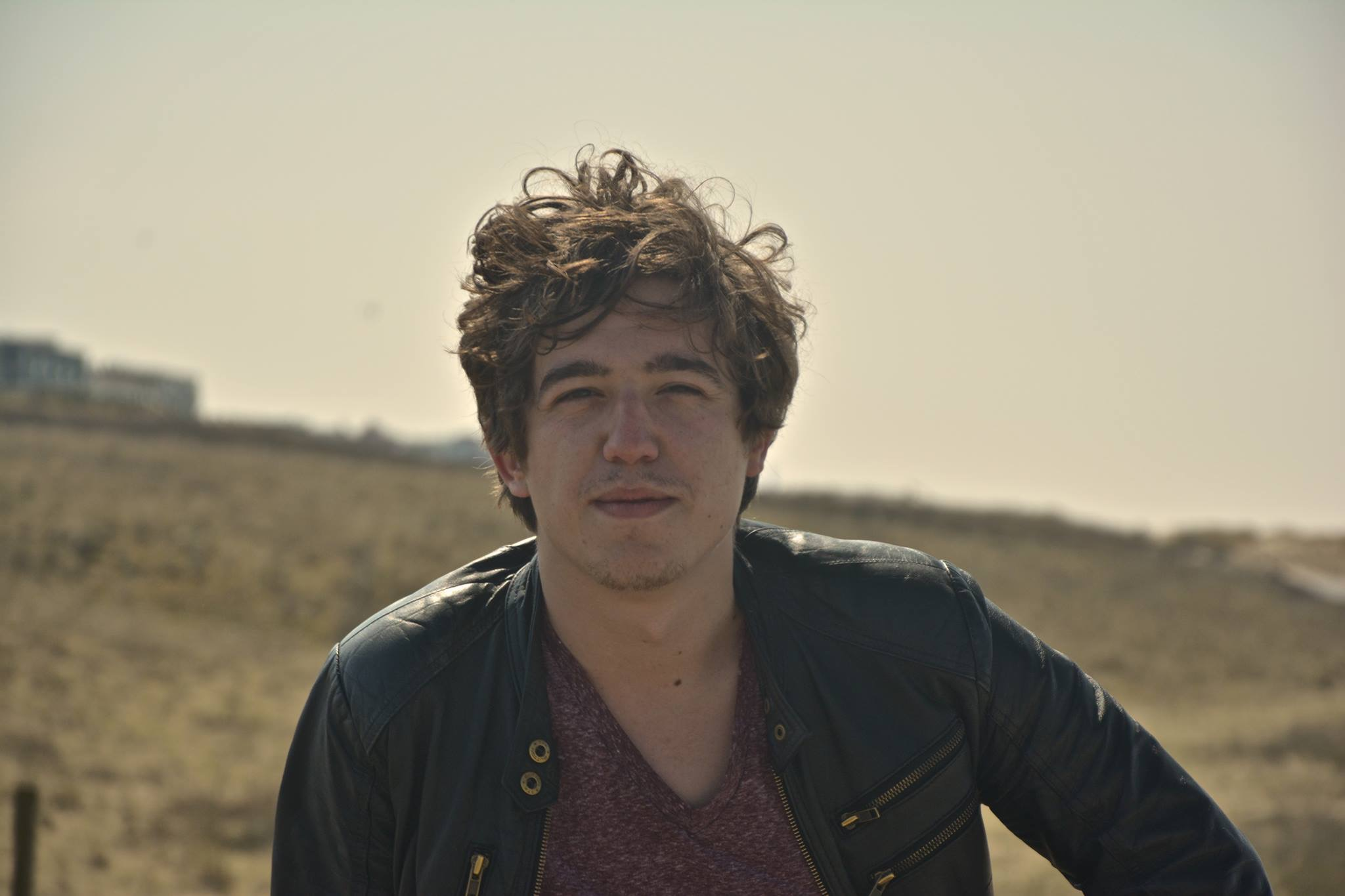
Alle Farben (pictured in 2014; top) was the first German artist atop the chart on 26 May. His song "Little Hollywood" with Janieck Devy (pictured in ?; bottom) topped the chart for four consecutive weeks.

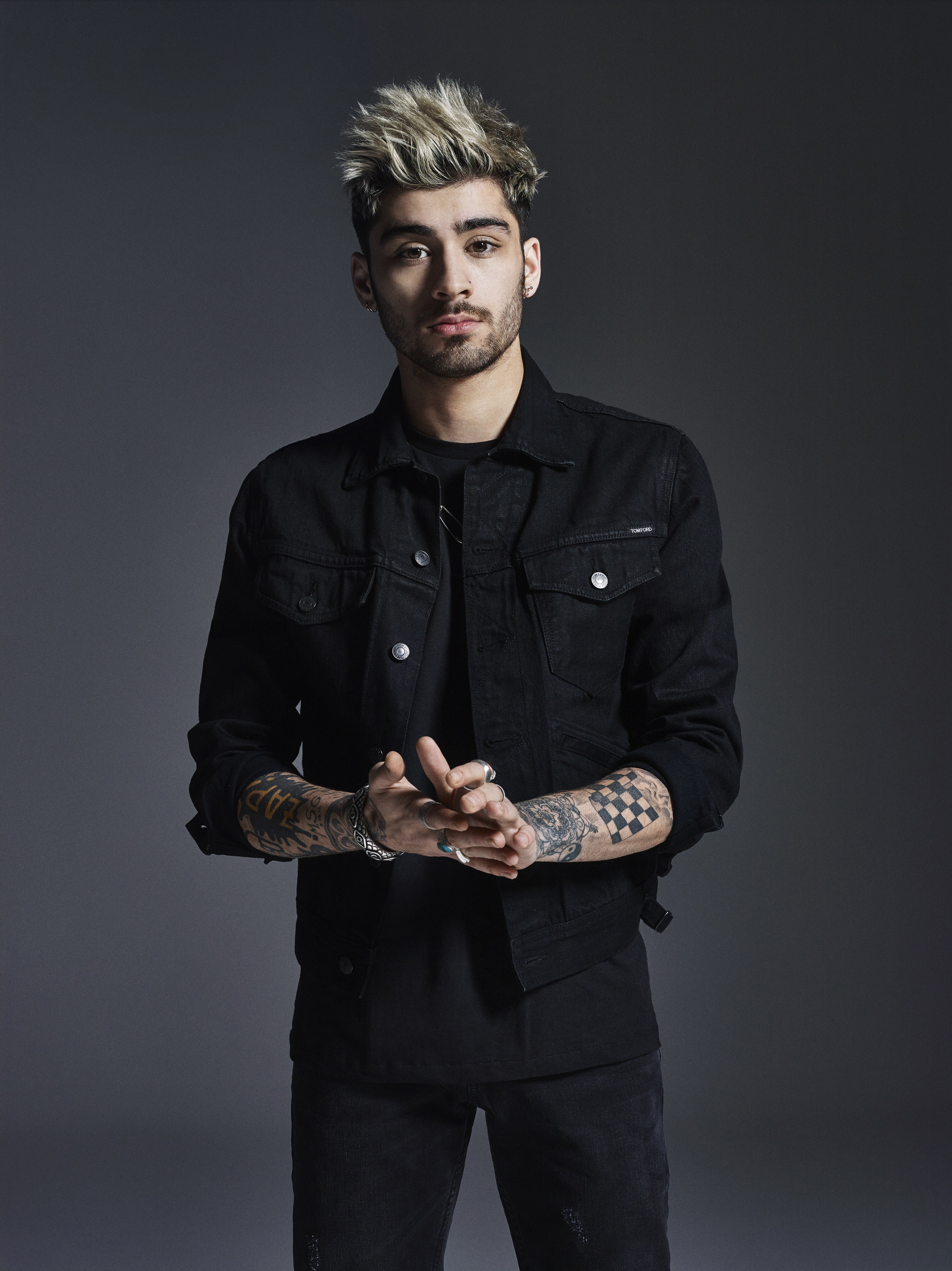
English singer Zayn's (pictured in 2015) song "Dusk Till Dawn" alongside Australian singer Sia was the second longest reigning song with 6 consecutive weeks.

Key
†	Indicates best-performing single of 2017
‡	Indicates singles which also reached the top of the German single chart

Issue date	Title	Artist(s)	Ref.
6 January	"Rockabye" ‡	Clean Bandit featuring Sean Paul and Anne-Marie	
13 January	"Rockabye" ‡	Clean Bandit featuring Sean Paul and Anne-Marie	
20 January	"Never Give Up"	Sia	
27 January	"Never Give Up"	Sia	
3 February	"Scars to Your Beautiful"	Alessia Cara	
10 February	"Shape of You" †‡	Ed Sheeran	
17 February	"Shape of You" †‡	Ed Sheeran	
24 February	"Shape of You" †‡	Ed Sheeran	
3 March	"Shape of You" †‡	Ed Sheeran	
10 March	"Shape of You" †‡	Ed Sheeran	
17 March	"Shape of You" †‡	Ed Sheeran	
24 March	"Shape of You" †‡	Ed Sheeran	
31 March	"Chained to the Rhythm"	Katy Perry featuring Skip Marley	
7 April	"Chained to the Rhythm"	Katy Perry featuring Skip Marley	
14 April	"Skin"	Rag'n'Bone Man	
21 April	"Chained to the Rhythm"	Katy Perry featuring Skip Marley	
28 April	"Something Just like This"	The Chainsmokers and Coldplay	
5 May	"Something Just like This"	The Chainsmokers and Coldplay	
12 May	"Despacito" ‡	Luis Fonsi featuring Daddy Yankee	
19 May	"Galway Girl"	Ed Sheeran	
26 May	"Little Hollywood"	Alle Farben & Janieck Devy	
2 June	"Little Hollywood"	Alle Farben & Janieck Devy	
9 June	"Little Hollywood"	Alle Farben & Janieck Devy	
16 June	"Little Hollywood"	Alle Farben & Janieck Devy	
23 June	"Hot2Touch"	Felix Jaehn, Hight & Alex Aiono	
30 June	"Hot2Touch"	Felix Jaehn, Hight & Alex Aiono	
7 July	"There's Nothing Holdin' Me Back"	Shawn Mendes	
14 July	"There's Nothing Holdin' Me Back"	Shawn Mendes	
21 July	"There's Nothing Holdin' Me Back"	Shawn Mendes	
28 July	"Hot2Touch"	Felix Jaehn, Hight & Alex Aiono	
4 August	"OK"	Robin Schulz featuring James Blunt	
11 August	"OK"	Robin Schulz featuring James Blunt	
18 August	"OK"	Robin Schulz featuring James Blunt	
25 August	"OK"	Robin Schulz featuring James Blunt	
1 September	"Feels"	Calvin Harris featuring Pharrell Williams, Katy Perry & Big Sean	
8 September	"Feels"	Calvin Harris featuring Pharrell Williams, Katy Perry & Big Sean	
15 September	"More Than You Know" ‡	Axwell Λ Ingrosso	
22 September	"What About Us"	Pink	
29 September	"What About Us"	Pink	
6 October	"What About Us"	Pink	
13 October	"What About Us"	Pink	
20 October	"What About Us"	Pink	
27 October	"Dusk Till Dawn"	Zayn featuring Sia	
3 November	"Dusk Till Dawn"	Zayn featuring Sia	
10 November	"Dusk Till Dawn"	Zayn featuring Sia	
17 November	"Dusk Till Dawn"	Zayn featuring Sia	
24 November	"Dusk Till Dawn"	Zayn featuring Sia	
1 December	"Dusk Till Dawn"	Zayn featuring Sia	
8 December	"Havana"	Camila Cabello featuring Young Thug	
15 December	"Perfect" ‡	Ed Sheeran	
22 December	"Perfect" ‡	Ed Sheeran	
29 December	"Perfect" ‡	Ed Sheeran	
