= List of German airplay number-one songs of 2015 =

The official German airplay chart ranks the most frequently broadcast songs on German radio stations. In 2015, 17 different songs reached the top, based on weekly airplay data compiled by MusicTrace on behalf of Bundesverband Musikindustrie (BVMI). The radio stations are chosen based on the reach of each station. A specific number of evaluated stations is not given.

== Chart history ==
Key
‡	Indicates singles which also reached the top of the German single chart

Issue date	Title	Artist(s)	Ref.
3 January	"Thinking Out Loud"	Ed Sheeran	
10 January	"Thinking Out Loud"	Ed Sheeran	
17 January	"Thinking Out Loud"	Ed Sheeran	
24 January	"Outside"	Calvin Harris featuring Ellie Goulding	
1 February	"Outside"	Calvin Harris featuring Ellie Goulding	
8 February	"Real Love"	Clean Bandit and Jess Glynne	
15 February	"Outside"	Calvin Harris featuring Ellie Goulding	
22 February	"Lips Are Movin"	Meghan Trainor	
1 March	"Lips Are Movin"	Meghan Trainor	
8 March	"Lips Are Movin"	Meghan Trainor	
15 March	"Lips Are Movin"	Meghan Trainor	
22 March	"Lips Are Movin"	Meghan Trainor	
29 March	"Love Me like You Do" ‡	Ellie Goulding	
5 April	"Love Me like You Do" ‡	Ellie Goulding	
12 April	"FourFiveSeconds"	Rihanna, Kanye West and Paul McCartney	
19 April	"Like I Can"	Sam Smith	
26 April	"Don't Worry"	Madcon featuring Ray Dalton	
3 May	"Don't Worry"	Madcon featuring Ray Dalton	
10 May	"Don't Worry"	Madcon featuring Ray Dalton	
17 May	"Don't Worry"	Madcon featuring Ray Dalton	
24 May	"Don't Worry"	Madcon featuring Ray Dalton	
31 May	"Want to Want Me"	Jason Derulo	
6 June	"Want to Want Me"	Jason Derulo	
13 June	"Headlights"	Robin Schulz	
20 June	"Headlights"	Robin Schulz	
27 June	"Stole the Show"	Kygo featuring Parson James	
4 July	"Stole the Show"	Kygo featuring Parson James	
11 July	"Bye Bye"	Cro	
18 July	"Bye Bye"	Cro	
25 July	"Bye Bye"	Cro	
1 August	"Bye Bye"	Cro	
8 August	"Reality"‡	Lost Frequencies featuring Janieck Devy	
15 August	"Reality"‡	Lost Frequencies featuring Janieck Devy	
22 August	"Sugar"	Robin Schulz featuring Francesco Yates	
29 August	"Sugar"	Robin Schulz featuring Francesco Yates	
5 September	"Sugar"	Robin Schulz featuring Francesco Yates	
12 September	"Sugar"	Robin Schulz featuring Francesco Yates	
19 September	"Sugar"	Robin Schulz featuring Francesco Yates	
25 September	"Sugar"	Robin Schulz featuring Francesco Yates	
2 October	"Sugar"	Robin Schulz featuring Francesco Yates	
9 October	"Sugar"	Robin Schulz featuring Francesco Yates	
16 October	"Sugar"	Robin Schulz featuring Francesco Yates	
23 October	"Book of Love"	Felix Jaehn featuring Polina	
30 October	"Book of Love"	Felix Jaehn featuring Polina	
6 November	"Book of Love"	Felix Jaehn featuring Polina	
13 November	"Book of Love"	Felix Jaehn featuring Polina	
20 November	"Hello" ‡	Adele	
27 November	"Hello" ‡	Adele	
4 December	"Hello" ‡	Adele	
11 December	"Hello" ‡	Adele	
18 December	"Hello" ‡	Adele	
25 December	"Hello" ‡	Adele	
