= Nevermind (Dennis Lloyd song) =

Single by Dennis Lloyd
- Released: 5 December 2016
- Genre: Deep house; dance-pop
- Length: 2:36
- Songwriter: Nir Tibor
- Producer: Tibor

Dennis Lloyd singles chronology
"Think About It" (2016)	"Nevermind" (2016)	"Analyzing" (2016)

Music video
- "Nevermind" on YouTube

"Nevermind" is a 2016 song by Israeli musician and singer Dennis Lloyd. It is his signature song and biggest hit single to date, having accumulated over 1 billion streams on Spotify and in June 2018, Time listed it as one of the "songs of summer".

== Track listing ==
Digital download
No.	Title	Length
1.	"Nevermind"	2:36

== Charts ==
=== Weekly charts ===
Chart (2018–2019)	Peak position
Australia (ARIA)	10
Australia Dance (ARIA)	15
Austria (Ö3 Austria Top 40)	1
Belgium (Ultratop 50 Flanders)	20
Belgium Dance (Ultratop Flanders)	3
Belgium (Ultratop 50 Wallonia)	26
Belgium Dance (Ultratop Wallonia)	3
Canada (Canadian Hot 100)	32
Czech Republic Airplay (ČNS IFPI)	6
Czech Republic Singles Digital (ČNS IFPI)	6
Denmark (Tracklisten)	22
France (SNEP)	10
Germany (GfK)	3
Greece (IFPI)	18
Hungary (Single Top 40)	11
Hungary (Stream Top 40)	3
Ireland (IRMA)	14
Italy (FIMI)	28
Netherlands (Single Top 100)	24
New Zealand (Recorded Music NZ)	15
Norway (VG-lista)	3
Poland Airplay (ZPAV)	14
Portugal (AFP)	29
Romania (Airplay 100)	7
Scotland Singles (OCC)	11
Slovakia Airplay (ČNS IFPI)	28
Slovakia Singles Digital (ČNS IFPI)	3
Slovenia (SloTop50)	3
Spain (Promusicae)	88
Sweden (Sverigetopplistan)	9
Switzerland (Schweizer Hitparade)	2
UK Singles (OCC)	17
US Billboard Hot 100	86
US Alternative Songs (Billboard)	3
US Adult Top 40 (Billboard)	31
US Mainstream Top 40 (Billboard)	30
US Dance Club Songs (Billboard)	33

=== Year-end charts ===
Chart (2018)	Position
Australia (ARIA)	44
Austria (Ö3 Austria Top 40)	2
Belgium (Ultratop Flanders)	50
Belgium (Ultratop Wallonia)	86
Canada (Canadian Hot 100)	73
Denmark (Tracklisten)	60
France (SNEP)	25
Germany (Official German Charts)	5
Hungary (Single Top 40)	49
Iceland (Plötutíóindi)	27
Ireland (IRMA)	29
Italy (FIMI)	85
Netherlands (Single Top 100)	78
New Zealand (Recorded Music NZ)	41
Portugal (AFP)	57
Romania (Airplay 100)	46
Slovenia (SloTop50)	22
Sweden (Sverigetopplistan)	46
Switzerland (Schweizer Hitparade)	5
UK Singles (Official Charts Company)	77

== Certifications ==
Region	Certification	Certified units/sales
Australia (ARIA)	2× Platinum	140,000^{‡}
Austria (IFPI Austria)	3× Platinum	90,000^{‡}
Belgium (BRMA)	Platinum	40,000^{‡}
Canada (Music Canada)	7× Platinum	560,000^{‡}
Denmark (IFPI Danmark)	Platinum	90,000^{‡}
France (SNEP)	Diamond	333,333^{‡}
Germany (BVMI)	3× Gold	600,000^{‡}
Italy (FIMI)	2× Platinum	100,000^{‡}
New Zealand (RMNZ)	5× Platinum	150,000^{‡}
Poland (ZPAV)	Diamond	250,000^{‡}
Portugal (AFP)	Platinum	10,000^{‡}
Spain (Promusicae)	Platinum	60,000^{‡}
Switzerland (IFPI Switzerland)	Platinum	30,000^{‡}
United Kingdom (BPI)	2× Platinum	1,200,000^{‡}
United States (RIAA)	Platinum	1,000,000^{‡}
^{‡} Sales+streaming figures based on certification alone.
