= List of German airplay number-one songs of 2005 =

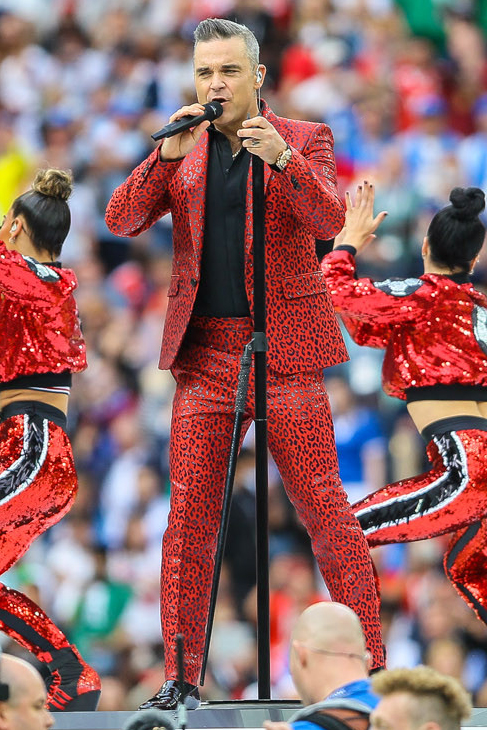
Three songs of English singer Robbie Williams topped the charts for a total of ten weeks.

The official German Airplay Chart is an airplay chart compiled by Nielsen Music Controlon behalf of Bundesverband Musikindustrie (Federal Association of Phonographic Industry). In 2005, 19 different songs by 15 artists reached the top of the chart. Robbie Williams "Misunderstood" was the first number-one of the year. It was replaced by Söhne Mannheims "Und wenn ein Lied...", the following week.

== Chart history ==
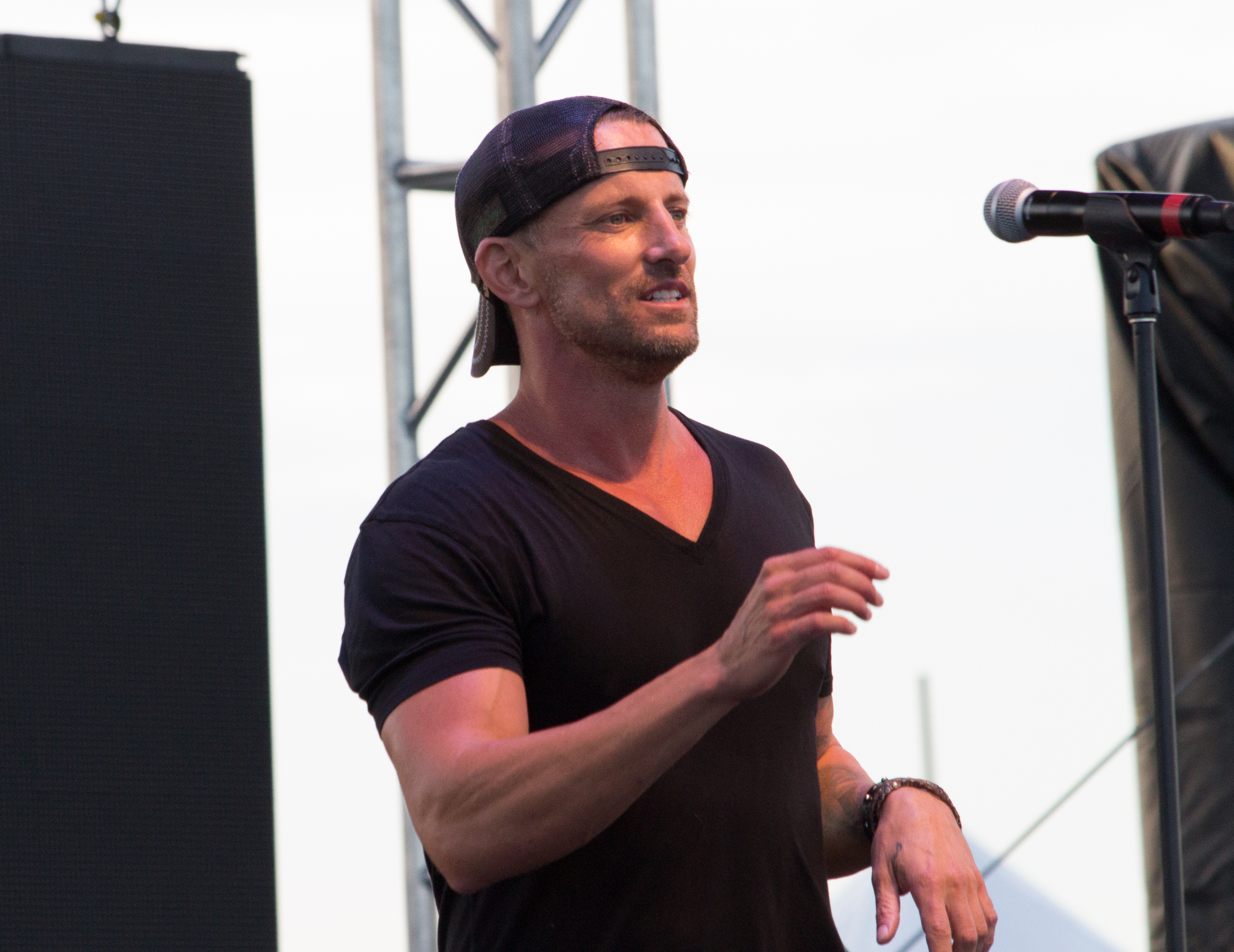
Canadian singer Daniel Powter single "Bad Day" topped the chart for eight consecutive weeks.

Key
‡	Indicates singles which also reached the top of the German single chart

CW.	Title	Artist(s)	Ref.
1	"Misunderstood"	Robbie Williams	
2	"Und wenn ein Lied..."	Söhne Mannheims	
3	"Geile Zeit"	Juli	
4	"Geile Zeit"	Juli	
5	"Boulevard of Broken Dreams"	Green Day	
6	"Unwritten"	Natasha Bedingfield	
7	"Unwritten"	Natasha Bedingfield	
8	"Unwritten"	Natasha Bedingfield	
9	"Unwritten"	Natasha Bedingfield	
10	"Unwritten"	Natasha Bedingfield	
11	"Liebe ist"‡	Nena	
12	"Liebe ist"‡	Nena	
13	"Liebe ist"‡	Nena	
14	"From Zero to Hero"‡	Sarah Connor	
15	"Let Me Love You"‡	Mario	
16	"Let Me Love You"‡	Mario	
17	"Next Best Superstar"	Melanie C	
18	"Next Best Superstar"	Melanie C	
19	"Shiver"	Natalie Imbruglia	
20	"Shiver"	Natalie Imbruglia	
21	"Regen und Meer"	Juli	
22	"Regen und Meer"	Juli	
23	"Lonely No More"	Rob Thomas	
24	"Lonely No More"	Rob Thomas	
25	"Speed of Sound"	Coldplay	
26	"Bad Day"	Daniel Powter	
27	"Bad Day"	Daniel Powter	
28	"Bad Day"	Daniel Powter	
29	"Bad Day"	Daniel Powter	
30	"Bad Day"	Daniel Powter	
31	"Bad Day"	Daniel Powter	
32	"Bad Day"	Daniel Powter	
33	"Bad Day"	Daniel Powter	
34	"Wake Me Up When September Ends"	Green Day	
35	"Don't Lie"	The Black Eyed Peas	
36	"Wake Me Up When September Ends"	Green Day	
37	"Don't Lie"	The Black Eyed Peas	
38	"Tripping"‡	Robbie Williams	
39	"Tripping"‡	Robbie Williams	
40	"Tripping"‡	Robbie Williams	
41	"Tripping"‡	Robbie Williams	
42	"Tripping"‡	Robbie Williams	
43	"Tripping"‡	Robbie Williams	
44	"Tripping"‡	Robbie Williams	
45	"Hung Up"‡	Madonna	
46	"Hung Up"‡	Madonna	
47	"Hung Up"‡	Madonna	
48	"Hung Up"‡	Madonna	
49	"Hung Up"‡	Madonna	
50	"Hung Up"‡	Madonna	
51	"Advertising Space"	Robbie Williams	
52	"Advertising Space"	Robbie Williams	
