= Dennis Lloyd =

Israeli record producer and musician

Dennis Lloyd ניר טיבור
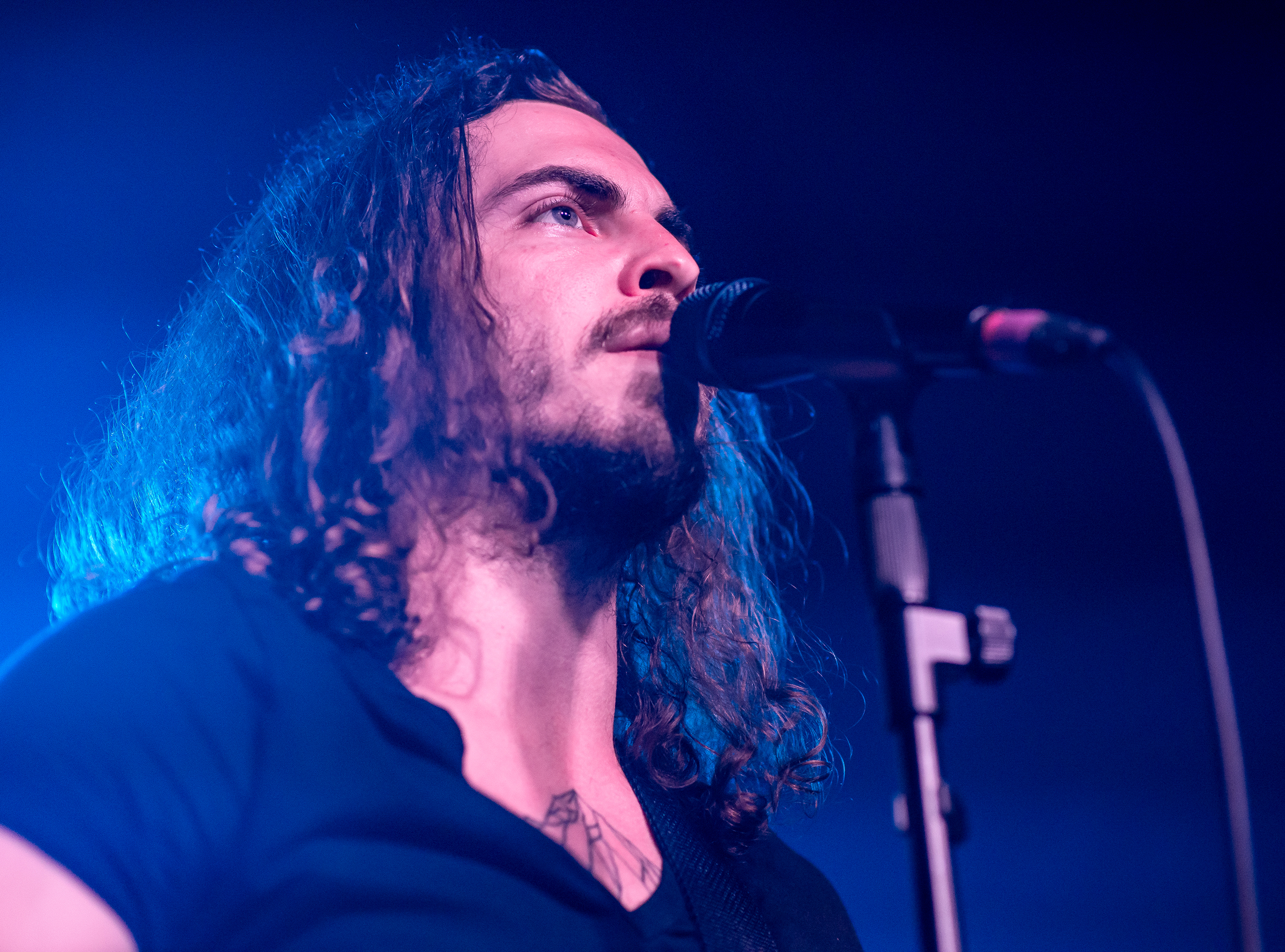
- Lloyd performing in 2018

Background information
- Born: Nir Tibor; 18 June 1993 (age 32); Tel Aviv, Israel
- Genres: Indie pop
- Instruments: Trumpet & guitar, keys
- Years active: 2015–present

Nir Tibor (Hebrew: ניר טיבור; born 18 June 1993), known professionally by his stage name Dennis Lloyd, is an Israeli musician, producer, singer, songwriter, and multi-instrumentalist. He is best known for his 2016 hit single "Nevermind", which charted in several countries.

Lloyd is considered one of the most successful musical artists to ever come out of Israel, achieving worldwide recognition.

== Early life and education ==
Nir Tibor was born in Tel Aviv, Israel, to an Ashkenazi family. He grew up largely in Ramat Gan. Lloyd learned how to play the trumpet at age 8 and taught himself to play the guitar at 13. He attended the Thelma Yellin High School of the Arts in Givatayim. At 18, he was conscripted into the Israeli Navy.

== Career ==
Lloyd released his first single, "Playa (Say That)", in mid-2015. Toward the end of 2015, he moved to Bangkok, Thailand, where he stayed for a year. During his time in Bangkok, Lloyd focused exclusively on music and wrote 35 songs. After his year in Bangkok, Lloyd returned to Israel where he began releasing more music including the songs, "Snow White" and "Nevermind (Alright)". Lloyd remixed the latter song and released it as "Nevermind" in the winter of 2016. The remixed version quickly garnered success on Spotify, eventually peaking at number 4 on the Spotify Global Viral chart. It would eventually accumulate more than 900 million streams on Spotify and over 1.5 million Shazams. In June 2018, Time listed it as one of the "songs of summer".

In June 2017, Lloyd was featured in a video on the German "Colors" YouTube channel, performing an acoustic version of his song "Leftovers". The video has accrued 43 million views. In March 2018, Lloyd announced the MTFKR Tour that began in May 2018 in Italy with dates across Europe and North America. The song "Nevermind" was featured in the commercial for the release of the new BMW 3 Series in 2019. Lloyd performed "Nevermind" on Jimmy Kimmel Live! on July 24, 2018.

In February 2019, Lloyd released his single "Never Go Back". "Never Go Back" received praise by various publications including Billboard, Time and Forbes. This single would lead into the release of Lloyd's debut EP Exident on April 5, 2019. Lloyd shared music videos for EP tracks "Never Go Back" and "GFY". Following this, Lloyd embarked on his sold-out Never Go Back tour across the United States, Canada and Australia, also performing at various music festivals including Coachella, Governor's Ball and Montreux Jazz Festival.

In July 2019, Dennis featured on a Spotify Singles session, collaborating with guitarist Tom Morello to cover Audioslave's "Like a Stone". On September 14, 2019, Lloyd released his song "Wild West", which was included on EA Sports' FIFA 20 soundtrack.

== Discography ==
=== Albums ===
Title	Details	Peak chart positions
Title	Details	SWI
Some Days	Released: 2 July 2021; Label: Arista; Formats: Digital download, streaming	38

=== Extended plays ===
Title	Details
The Breakdown	Released: 7 October 2015; Label: Self-release; Formats: Digital download
Acts & Results	Released: 7 August 2019; Label: Self-release; Format: Digital download, streaming
Exident	Released: 5 April 2019; Label: Arista; Formats: Digital download, streaming
Spotify Singles	Released: 7 August 2019; Label: Arista; Format: Streaming

=== Singles ===
Title	Year	Peak positions													Certifications	Album
Title	Year	ISR	AUS	AUT	BEL (FL)	FRA	GER	ITA	NLD	NOR	SWE	SWI	UK	US	Certifications	Album
"Playa (Say That)"	2015	—	—	—	—	—	—	—	—	—	—	—	—	—		Non-album singles
"Snow White"	2015	—	—	—	—	—	—	—	—	—	—	—	—	—		Non-album singles
"Demons"	2016	—	—	—	—	—	—	—	—	—	—	—	—	—		Non-album singles
"Acts & Results"	2016	—	—	—	—	—	—	—	—	—	—	—	—	—		Non-album singles
"Think About It"	2016	—	—	—	—	—	—	—	—	—	—	—	—	—		Non-album singles
"Nevermind"	2016	1	10	1	20	16	3	28	24	3	9	2	17	86	ARIA: 2× Platinum; BPI: 2× Platinum; BVMI: 3× Gold; FIMI: 2× Platinum; IFPI AUT: Platinum; IFPI SWI: Platinum; SNEP: Platinum; RIAA: Platinum	Non-album singles
"Analyzing"	2016	—	—	—	—	—	—	—	—	—	—	—	—	—		Non-album singles
"Leftovers"	2017	—	—	—	—	—	—	—	—	—	—	—	—	—		Non-album singles
"Nevermind (Alright)"	2017	—	—	—	—	—	—	—	—	—	—	—	—	—		Non-album singles
"Never Go Back"	2019	1	—	32	—	51	40	—	—	—	49	31	—	—	BVMI: Gold; SNEP: Gold	Exident
"Wild West"	2019	—	—	—	—	—	—	3	—	—	—	—	—	—		Non-album singles
"Unfaithful"	2019	—	—	—	—	—	—	20	—	—	—	—	—	—		Non-album singles
"Alien"	2020	1	—	28	—	122	32	—	—	—	—	47	—	—	BVMI: Gold	Some Days
"Anxious"	2021	—	—	—	—	—	—	—	—	—	—	—	—	—		Some Days
"The Way"	2021	—	—	—	—	—	—	—	—	—	—	—	—	—		Some Days
"Young Right Now" (with Robin Schulz)	2021	—	—	32	20	80	28	—	40	—	—	17	—	—	BVMI: Gold; IFPI AUT: Platinum	Pink
"Berlin"	2022	—	—	—	—	—	—	—	—	—	—	—	—	—		Non-album singles
"Mad World"	2025	—	—	—	—	—	—	—	—	—	—	—	—	—		Non-album singles
"Diamonds" (with YouNotUs)	2026	—	—	—	—	—	—	—	—	—	—	—	—	—		Non-album singles
"—" denotes a recording that did not chart or was not released in that territory.
