= List of German airplay number-one songs of 2006 =

The official German Airplay Chart is an airplay chart compiled by Nielsen Music Controlon behalf of Bundesverband Musikindustrie (Federal Association of Phonographic Industry). In 2006, 22 different songs by 19 artists reached the top of the chart. Robbie Williams's song "Advertising Space" was the first number-one of the year.

== Chart history ==
Key
‡	Indicates singles which also reached the top of the German single chart

Week	Title	Artist	Ref
1	"Advertising Space"	Robbie Williams	
2	"Advertising Space"	Robbie Williams	
3	"Hung Up"‡	Madonna	
4	"High"	James Blunt	
5	"High"	James Blunt	
6	"Far Away"	Nickelback	
7	"High"	James Blunt	
8	"High"	James Blunt	
9	"Sorry"	Madonna	
10	"Sorry"	Madonna	
11	"Sorry"	Madonna	
12	"Sorry"	Madonna	
13	"Because of You"	Kelly Clarkson	
14	"Stupid Girls"	Pink	
15	"Stupid Girls"	Pink	
16	"Promise (You and Me)"	Reamonn	
17	"Because of You"	Kelly Clarkson	
18	"Unendlich"	Silbermond	
19	"Because of You"	Kelly Clarkson	
20	"Hips Don't Lie"‡	Shakira featuring Wyclef Jean	
21	"Hips Don't Lie"‡	Shakira featuring Wyclef Jean	
22	"Hips Don't Lie"‡	Shakira featuring Wyclef Jean	
23	"Sin Sin Sin"	Robbie Williams	
24	"Sin Sin Sin"	Robbie Williams	
25	"Sin Sin Sin"	Robbie Williams	
26	"Who Knew"	Pink	
27	"Hips Don't Lie"‡	Shakira featuring Wyclef Jean	
28	"Hips Don't Lie"‡	Shakira featuring Wyclef Jean	
29	"Hips Don't Lie"‡	Shakira featuring Wyclef Jean	
30	"Tonight"	Reamonn	
31	"Tonight"	Reamonn	
32	"Tonight"	Reamonn	
33	"Breakaway"	Kelly Clarkson	
34	"Breakaway"	Kelly Clarkson	
35	"Breakaway"	Kelly Clarkson	
36	"Wisemen"	James Blunt	
37	"Wisemen"	James Blunt	
38	"Tonight"	Reamonn	
39	"Dieses Leben"	Juli	
40	"Dieses Leben"	Juli	
41	"Dieses Leben"	Juli	
42	"Dieses Leben"	Juli	
43	"Dieses Leben"	Juli	
44	"Das Beste"‡	Silbermond	
45	"Das Beste"‡	Silbermond	
46	"Patience"‡	Take That	
47	"Hurt"	Christina Aguilera	
48	"Was wir alleine nicht schaffen"	Xavier Naidoo	
49	"All Good Things (Come to an End)"‡	Nelly Furtado	
50	"All Good Things (Come to an End)"‡	Nelly Furtado	
51	"All Good Things (Come to an End)"‡	Nelly Furtado	
52	"All Good Things (Come to an End)"‡	Nelly Furtado	
