= Young Right Now =

2021 single by Robin Schulz and Dennis Lloyd

Single by Robin Schulz and Dennis Lloyd

from the album Pink
- Released: 12 November 2021
- Length: 3:06
- Label: Warner
- Songwriter(s): Daniel Deimann; Dennis Bierbrodt; Dennis Lloyd; Guido Kramer; Jürgen Dohr; Robin Schulz; Robin Stjernberg; Sandro Cavazza; Fredrik Samsson; Stefan Dabruck
- Producer(s): Dennis Lloyd; Junkx; Robin Schulz

Robin Schulz singles chronology
"I Got a Feeling" (2021)	"Young Right Now" (2021)	"In Your Arms (For an Angel)" (2022)

Dennis Lloyd singles chronology
"The Way" (2021)	"Young Right Now" (2021)	"Not Around Me" (2023)

Music video
- "Young Right Now" on YouTube

"Young Right Now" is a song by German DJ and record producer Robin Schulz and Israeli singer-songwriter and producer Dennis Lloyd, released as a single on 12 November 2021. The song was written by Daniel Deimann, Dennis Bierbrodt, Lloyd, Guido Kramer, Jürgen Dohr, Schulz, Robin Stjernberg, Sandro Cavazza, Fredrik Samsson, Stefan Dabruck, and produced by Schulz, Lloyd and Junkx.

== Background and content ==
"Having written 'Young Right Now' when I was eighteen, ten years later to have Robin hear it and bring a fresh, exciting perspective to the production has me super excited for the song to be heard. The lyrics couldn't be more relevant to today’s world".

— Dennis Lloyd, We Rave You

Ale Mancinelli of EDM-Lab wrote that the song talks about "the young people who are fighting against global warming". It is written in the key of F major, with a tempo of 123 beats per minute.

== Track listing ==
Digital download
No.	Title	Length
1.	"Young Right Now"	3:06

Digital download – VIP mix
No.	Title	Length
1.	"Young Right Now" (VIP mix)	2:58

== Credits and personnel ==
Credits adapted from AllMusic.

- Dennis Bierbrodt – composer, lyricist
- Sandro Cavazza – composer, lyricist
- Stefan Dabruck – composer, lyricist
- Daniel Deimann – composer, lyricist
- Jürgen Dohr – composer, lyricist
- Junkx – engineer, keyboards, mixing, producer, programming
- Guido Kramer – composer, lyricist
- Dennis Lloyd – composer, guitar, lyricist, primary artist, producer, vocals
- Robin Schulz – composer, keyboards, lyricist, primary artist, producer, programming
- Michael Schwabe – mastering
- Robin Stjernberg – composer, lyricist

== Charts ==
=== Weekly charts ===
Weekly chart performance for "Young Right Now"
Chart (2021–2022)	Peak position
Austria (Ö3 Austria Top 40)	32
Belgium (Ultratop 50 Flanders)	20
Croatia (HRT)	12
Czech Republic (Rádio – Top 100)	35
France (SNEP)	80
Germany (GfK)	28
Germany Airplay (BVMI)	1
Hungary (Rádiós Top 40)	39
Netherlands (Dutch Top 40)	10
Netherlands (Single Top 100)	40
Poland (Polish Airplay Top 100)	3
Slovakia (Rádio Top 100)	9
Switzerland (Schweizer Hitparade)	17
US Hot Dance/Electronic Songs (Billboard)	40

=== Year-end charts ===
2022 year-end chart performance for "Young Right Now"
Chart (2022)	Position
Austria (Ö3 Austria Top 40)	62
Belgium (Ultratop 50 Flanders)	49
Germany (Official German Charts)	68
Netherlands (Dutch Top 40)	35
Poland (ZPAV)	58
Switzerland (Schweizer Hitparade)	43

== Certifications ==
Region	Certification	Certified units/sales
Austria (IFPI Austria)	Platinum	30,000^{‡}
France (SNEP)	Gold	100,000^{‡}
Germany (BVMI)	Gold	200,000^{‡}
Poland (ZPAV)	Platinum	50,000^{‡}
^{‡} Sales+streaming figures based on certification alone.
