= 2009 in hip-hop =

This article summarizes the events, album releases, and album release dates in hip-hop for the year 2009.

== Events ==
=== January ===
- Eminem, 50 Cent and Dr. Dre's new song "Crack a Bottle" has leaked on the internet. The song will be featured on Eminem's Relapse as a track not a single. It later reached number one.
- Jermaine Dupri has split from Def Jam.
- Bun B stated there would be one last album by UGK titled 4 Life. Bun B stated that the album would have 12 tracks and no guest appearances.
- Lupe Fiasco, last year stated he would be retiring and ending his career with a 3 disc album entitled LupE.N.D but now he said he is not going to retire instead, he's planning to release three albums over the next year and a half.

=== February ===
- Soulja Boy and Bow Wow start a small feud. They both release diss tracks, but later ended it.
- 50 Cent and Rick Ross began trading insults on various diss tracks.
- For the first time in four years, The Game says he sides with 50 Cent in a beef; continuing to state that Rick Ross needs to ring him so he can help Ross out of the career ending mess he has become involved in with 50 Cent.
- Lil Wayne won four Grammy Awards at the 2009 Grammy Awards, followed by Kanye West winning two awards and Jay-Z and T.I. winning one each.
- Deonta Cummings is filing a suit against Jim Jones and E1 Records alleging that his artist, Ivory Keys, was not given proper compensation or credit for his contribution to the album Jim Jones & Skull Gang Present A Tribute To Bad Santa Starring Mike Epps.
- Lil Wayne's Tha Carter III sold 3 million copies.
- Lil Wayne sued for $1.3 Million caused by canceling New York shows.
- Flo Rida breaks a digital sales record, by selling over 630,000 digital units of his single "Right Round" in one week.
- Eminem sues Universal Music over digital royalties.
- Upcoming rap artist Drake comes out with mixtape named So Far Gone spawning the six hit singles Best I Ever Had, Say Something, Brand New, Houstatlantavegas, Forever, and Uptown.

=== March ===
- Snoop Dogg joins the Nation of Islam.
- Eminem plans to release two albums in this year.
- 50 Cent also plans to release two albums this year and joins Fall Out Boy in their tour.
- Rapper B.o.B changes his stage name to Bobby Ray.
- R.O.O.T.S. the second album from Flo Rida leaks onto the internet on March 24.
- T.I. is sentenced to go to jail for 1 year and a day for gun possessions. He will go to federal prison sometime after May 19 for trying to purchase machine guns, ammunition, and silencers in October 2007.
- New Jack City II the last album from Bow Wow leaks onto the internet.
- Cam'ron says there will not be a Dipset reunion.

=== April ===
- Jadakiss releases his third studio album, The Last Kiss.
- Cash Money Records are suing mixtape DJs including DJ Drama
- Bone Thugs-n-Harmony member Flesh-n-Bone got picked up on gun possession charges in Santa Clarita, California according to TMZ.
- Ludacris signed rapper Lil Scrappy to his Disturbing tha Peace imprint.
- Jim Jones was arrested in New Jersey, on an outstanding warrant, all while giving followers on his Twitter page updates during the incident.
- Eminem releases his first official single in 2 years, "We Made You" off his highly anticipated album Relapse.
- Cam'ron says he and Jim Jones are done on Hot 97.
- Bow Wow announces that he is dismissing himself from the rap game, because he feels there is no more to be done on the music side.
- Asher Roth's Asleep in the Bread Aisle & Rick Ross' Deeper Than Rap leaked onto the internet before their official release.

=== May ===
- The Smoking Gun a website that posts legal documents, arrest records, and police mugshots on a daily basis, exposes Cedric "Alfamega" Zellars, as his last job being a DEA informant.
- T.I. drops Alfamega from Grand Hustle Records.
- DMX is released from prison in Arizona.
- Jermaine Dupri, Nelly, Usher, Bryan-Michael Cox, Johntá Austin, Trey Songz & Tyrone Davis form a Hip-Hop/R&B Supergroup, known as Ocean's 7.
- Method Man and Joe Budden start beefing.
- Rapper/producer Swizz Beatz admitted to having a relationship with Alicia Keys.
- Atlanta-based rapper Dolla was shot dead at the Beverly Center on May 18.
- Jay-Z officially leaves Def Jam Records.
- T.I. checked into a federal prison in Forrest City, Arkansas on Tuesday (May 26). The rapper is serving a 366-day federal prison sentence for attempting to buy illegal machine guns and silencers from undercover agents in October 2007.
- Eminem becomes the highest selling artist of 2009 so far with the release of Relapse.
- Rapper Tega, known for being a member of Nelly's St. Lunatics crew, died May 27 from injuries he sustained after being shot on May 16.
- Rapper DJ Paul releases his first solo album in 7 years. Guests includes Lord Infamous

=== June ===
- Jay-Z announces he will release The Blueprint³ September 11, 2009.
- 50 Cent releases a mixtape called War Angel LP and says "it's the best body of work I put out in the mixtape circuit".
- Plies throws $50,000 into the concert crowd at the 107.9 FM Birthday Bash at Philips Arena to promote his single "Plenty Money".
- Legendary graffiti artist IZ the Wiz dies.
- Michael Jackson dies at the age of 50.
- Daz Dillinger disses Jermaine Dupri, Suge Knight and Alan Grumblatt.
- The Game ends beef with 50 Cent on Michael Jackson tribute song Better on the Other Side.

=== July ===
- The Game apologizes to 50 Cent and Interscope.
- Alfamega announces he is still signed to Grand Hustle. His manager Reek Walker says "We never received any documentation. Technically, Alfa is still a member of Grand Hustle. T.I. can denounce him all he wants, but as long as that contract is in [place], he's still there."
- BET has expressed remorse over a performance by Lil Wayne, Drake and Young Money Entertainment that involved underage girls during songs "Best I Ever Had" and "Every Girl".
- The death of Michael Jackson inspires Mase's return to music.
- Jay-Z becomes hip hop's biggest earner topping the 2009 Forbes Hip-Hop Cash Kings List.
- Red City Entertainment sues Lil Wayne for not appearing at a concert in the Bahamas, which they paid $432,000 up front for him to appear.
- The Game leaks out a diss track aiming at Jay-Z.
- Soulja Boy Tell Em attempts to end beef with New Boyz
- Rakim makes an official comeback and releases his first single, "Holy Are You", off his upcoming third solo studio album The Seventh Seal; ten years after his 1999 album The Master.
- Monkey: Journey to the West English rapper, it's an animated movie similar to gorillaz singer and songwriter.
- Fabolous's fifth studio album Loso's Way leaks onto the internet a week before its official release.
- Jermaine Dupri and Janet Jackson split up after a seven-year relationship
- Pitbull launches a new website blog at planetpit.com.
- Eminem leaks a diss track aimed at Mariah Carey and Nick Cannon in response to Mariah Carey's "Obsessed".
- Fat Joe announces on Twitter that his album Jealous Ones Still Envy 2 (J.O.S.E. 2) will be released on October 6, 2009. He comes out with a second single for the album, Aloha.
- The final Big Pun recordings are announced to be released in September, with the DVD release of Big Pun: The Legacy.
- Young Jeezy disses DJ Drama in XXL Magazine; Drama responds on Twitter.
- Cam'ron announces that he will expand his record label under the new company U.N., and will launch Dipset West.
- The company who created the Auto-Tune, Antares Audio Technologies, said that since the release of Jay-Z's single D.O.A. (Death of Auto-Tune), the Auto-tune sales have increased.
- Baatin of Slum Village dies, July 31, 2009.

=== August ===
- Hell Rell blames Jim Jones for Dipset falling apart.
- The Game and others are sued by Robert Kirkwood, for fighting at a family funeral.
- Chamillionaire releases the final mixtape in the Mixtape Messiah Series, Mixtape Messiah 7.
- Joe Budden attacked by Raekwon and his crew.
- C-Murder sentenced to life in prison for murder.
- Bow Wow signs with Cash Money Records.
- Pitbull received the key to his home-city of Miami.
- Adam Goldstein a club disc jockey better known as DJ AM died of an accidental drug overdose August 28.

=== September ===
- Harlem-based rapper Max B was sentenced to 75 years in prison September 3 for his role in a botched robbery that led to a double murder in a Fort Lee, New Jersey hotel.
- On September 8, 50 Cent & Robert Greene released their book "The 50th Law".
- On September 13, 2009, while Taylor Swift presented her speech in winning Best Female Video at the 2009 MTV Video Music Awards, Kanye West interrupted her speech and stated that Beyoncé had a better video. His outburst received negative reaction from the audience and he was removed from the award show. He later apologized.
- Jay-Z and Alicia Keys performed "Empire State of Mind" at the 2009 MTV Video Music Awards. Towards the end of performing, Lil Mama jumped onstage.
- Rapper/producer Kia Shine stated he co-wrote "Best I Ever Had" with Drake and has of 25% ownership of the song, at the BMI awards; but Drake later denied this on his blog.
- DJ, turntablist & producer, Roc Raida died on September 19.
- Rapper Lil Boosie was sentenced to two years in prison for gun and marijuana possession. He could serve as little as one year depending on his behavior in prison.
- Charles Hamilton was released from Interscope Records on September 19.
- New York-based rapper N.O.R.E. releases a video blog saying he doesn't support S.O.R.E., an album that hit stores on September 15 that was supposedly released by him.
- Chamillionaire announces his third studio album, Venom, to be released on February 2, 2010.

=== October ===
- DJ, Mr. Magic dies of a heart attack.
- Wu-Tang Clan's Method Man, was arrested on October 5 for tax evasion.
- Jim Jones pleaded guilty on October 5 in a New York courtroom to a misdemeanor assault charge – a result of an altercation involving a member of singer Ne-Yo's entourage last December.
- Chamillionaire released the first single, "Good Morning", from his upcoming album on iTunes
- Lil Wayne pleads guilty to gun charges from his 2007 arrest and could face up 8 months to 1 year in prison.
- Rapper Jamal "Shyne" Barrow was released from prison after serving almost nine years for his role in a violent nightclub shooting in 1999 involving Bad Boy mogul Sean "Diddy" Combs and his ex-girlfriend, Jennifer Lopez. He was deported to Belize the next day.

=== November ===
- Gucci Mane is sentenced to 12 months in jail for violating probation.
- Lil Boosie has his sentence doubled to 4 years for marijuana and gun charges.
- Beanie Sigel as well as 50 Cent, has ignited a beef with Jay-Z.

=== December ===
- Young Jeezy has squashed his beef with DJ Drama as well as Gucci Mane.
- Jim Jones leaves Columbia Records and stays at E1.
- Long-awaited Lil Wayne album, Rebirth leaks 2 months before release.
- Billboard names The Neptunes "Producers Of Decade".
- Entertainment Weekly named Kid Cudi's Man on the Moon: The End of Day the best Hip-Hop Album of 2009.
- T.I. was released three months early from prison and was admitted into a halfway house in his hometown of Atlanta.
- Following the burglary in his St. Louis mansion, Nelly offers a cash reward for information leading to the arrest of the housebreaker.
- Trina made an appearance at Minnesota Vikings tackle Bryant McKinnie's birthday party and while on stage took shots at rapper Khia.

== Albums ==
| Release Date | Artist | Album | Notes |
|---|---|---|---|
| January 13 | Various artists | Notorious | Debuted at No. 4 on the Billboard 200; Jay-Z & Jadakiss have tracks on the album |
| January 27 | OJ Da Juiceman | The Otha Side of the Trap | Failed to Debut on Billboard 200, but debuts at No. 9 on Billboard Rap Albums; Singles: "I’m Gettin' Money", "Make Tha Trap Say Aye" |
| January 27 | Lisa "Left Eye" Lopes | Eye Legacy | Failed to chart on Billboard 200, but peaked at No. 44 on Billboard R&B/Hip-Hop Albums; Singles: "Crank It", "Let's Just Do It", "Block Party"; This was Lisa Lopes' first posthumously released album, after her death in 2002. |
| January 27 | X Clan | Mainstream Outlawz | |
| February 17 | Zion I | The Takeover | |
| February 24 | B-Real | Smoke N Mirrors | Debuted at No. 143 on the Billboard 200; Singles: "Fire" |
| February 24 | Grandmaster Flash | The Bridge - Concept Of A Culture | Failed to chart on the Billboard 200; Singles: "Swagger" |
| February 24 | Havoc | Hidden Files | Singles: "Watch Me", "Heart of the Grind" |
| February 24 | Joe Budden | Padded Room | Debuted at No. 42 on the Billboard 200; Singles: "The Future", "In My Sleep" |
| February 24 | Project Pat | Real Recognize Real | Debuted at No. 70 on the Billboard 200; Singles: "Keep It Hood" |
| February 27 | O.S.T.R. | O.c.b. | Debuted at No. 2 on the OLiS |
| March 3 | Romeo | Get Low | Debuted at No. 149 on the Billboard 200; Singles: "Get Low wit it" |
| March 17 | Gorilla Zoe | Don't Feed Da Animals | Debuted at No. 8 on the Billboard 200; Singles: "Lost", "What It Is", "Echo" |
| March 17 | Capone-N-Noreaga | Channel 10 | Debuted at No. 136 on the Billboard 200; Singles: "Rotate", "Talk To Me Big Time"; Their first album in nine years |
| March 17 | Twiztid | W.I.C.K.E.D. (Wish I Could Kill Every Day) | |
| March 23 | Noah23 & Madadam | Crab Nebula | |
| March 24 | MF Doom | Born Like This | |
| March 24 | Jim Jones | Pray IV Reign | Debuted at No. 9 on the Billboard 200; Singles: "Pop Champagne", "Na Na Nana Na Na", "Blow the Bank"; Major label debut |
| March 24 | Slim Thug | Boss of All Bosses | Debuted at No. 15 on the Billboard 200; Singles: "I Run" |
| March 24 | Hell Rell | Get In Line or Get Lined Up | Failed to chart on the Billboard 200; Singles: "Shoot 'em Up" |
| March 31 | Bow Wow | New Jack City II | Debuted at No. 16 on the Billboard 200; Singles: "You Can Get It All" |
| March 31 | Flo Rida | R.O.O.T.S. | Debuted at No. 8 on the Billboard 200; Singles: "Right Round", "Shone", "Sugar"; The album spawned his second #1 single; "Right Round" |
| March 31 | Stoupe the Enemy of Mankind | Decalogue | |
| March 31 | UGK | UGK 4 Life | Debuted at No. 6 on the Billboard 200; Singles: "Da Game Been Good to Me" |
| April 7 | Classified | Self Explanatory | Failed to chart on the Billboard 200, but debuted at No. 25 on the Canadian Albums Chart; Singles: "Anybody Listening" |
| April 7 | Del the Funky Homosapien | Funk Man (The Stimulus Package) | |
| April 7 | Jadakiss | The Last Kiss | Debuted at No. 3 on the Billboard 200; Singles: "By My Side", "Can't Stop Me", "Death Wish", "Who's Real"; The last album title to contain the word "kiss". |
| April 7 | Mims | Guilt | Debuted at No. 53 on the Billboard 200; Singles: "Move (If You Wanna)", "Love Rollercoaster" |
| April 7 | Mobb Deep | The Safe Is Cracked | |
| April 11 | Various Artists | Lost in the Game (soundtrack) | |
| April 14 | k-os | Yes! | Singles: "4, 3, 2, 1" |
| April 20 | Asher Roth | Asleep in the Bread Aisle | Debuted at No. 5 on the Billboard 200; Singles: "I Love College", "Lark on My Go-Kart", "Be by Myself" |
| April 21 | Rick Ross | Deeper Than Rap | Debuted at No. 1 on the Billboard 200; Singles: "Mafia Music", "Magnificent", All I Really Want", "Maybach Music 2" |
| April 21 | X-Raided | The Eternally Unforgiven Project | Failed to chart on the Billboard 200 |
| April 28 | Hell Rell | Hard as Hell | Failed to chart on the Billboard 200 |
| April 28 | Mike Jones | The Voice | Debuted at No. 12 on the Billboard 200; Singles: "Drop & Gimme 50", "Cuddy Buddy", "Next To You", "Swagg Thru The Roof" |
| April 28 | Tech N9ne | Sickology 101 | Debuted at No. 19 on the Billboard 200; Singles: "Red Nose", "Sickology 101", "Nothin'" |
| April 28 | Violent J | The Shining | Debuted at No. 48 on the Billboard 200; Singles: "Jealousy" |
| May 1 | Bobby Creekwater | The B.C. Era Deuce EP | Failed to chart on the Billboard 200 |
| May 5 | Skull Gang | Skull Gang | Debuted at No. 142 on the Billboard 200; Singles: "I am the Club", "Aggy" |
| May 5 | DJ Paul | Scale-A-Ton | Debuted at No. 157 on the Billboard 200; Singles: "Jus Like Dat", "You Don't Want It" |
| May 5 | Gucci Mane | Murder Was The Case | Debuted at No. 23 on the Billboard 200; Singles: "Stoopid" |
| May 12 | Cam'ron | Crime Pays | Debuted at No. 3 on the Billboard 200; Singles: "My Job", "Get it in Ohio" |
| May 12 | Haystak | The Natural II | Failed to chart on the Billboard 200 |
| May 12 | Paul Wall | Fast Life | Debuted at No. 15 on the Billboard 200; Singles: "Bizzy Body" |
| May 19 | Eminem | Relapse | Debuted at No. 1 on the Billboard 200; Singles: "Crack a Bottle", "We Made You", "3 a.m.", "Old Time's Sake", "Beautiful"; Certified Platinum |
| May 19 | Busta Rhymes | Back on My B.S. | Debuted at No. 5 on the Billboard 200; Singles: "Arab Money", "Hustler's Anthem '09", "Respect My Conglomerate", "World Go Round" |
| May 19 | Method Man & Redman | Blackout! 2 | Debuted at No. 7 on the Billboard 200; Singles: "A-Yo", "Mrs. International" |
| May 19 | DJ Drama | Gangsta Grillz: The Album (Vol. 2) | Debuted at No. 26 on the Billboard 200; Singles: "Day Dreaming", "Ridiculous" |
| May 19 | Sheek Louch | Life on D-Block | Debuted at No. 122 on the Billboard 200; Singles: "In the Rain" |
| May 19 | Freeway | Philadelphia Freeway 2 | Debuted at No. 99 on the Billboard 200; Singles: "Finally Free" |
| May 19 | Guru | Guru 8.0: Lost and Found | Failed to chart on the Billboard 200; Singles: "Divine Rule", "Fastlane", "Ride", "After Time & "No Gimmick Sh*t" |
| May 26 | Lil' Flip & Gudda Gudda | Certified | Failed to chart on the Billboard 200 |
| June 2 | J Dilla | Jay Stay Paid | Debuted at No. 96 on the Billboard 200; Singles: "Reality Check" |
| June 2 | AZ | Legendary | Failed to chart on the Billboard 200, but debuted at No. 54 on the Top R&B/Hip-Hop Albums and at No. 24 on the Top Rap Albums; Singles: "Get Money" |
| June 9 | Pastor Troy | Ready For War | Failed to chart on the Billboard 200, but debuted at No. 52 on the Top R&B/Hip-Hop Albums and at No. 25 on the Top Rap Albums; Singles: "PT" |
| June 9 | D-Block | No Security | Debuted at No. 40 on the Billboard 200; Singles: "Get That Paper" |
| June 9 | Mos Def | The Ecstatic | Debuts at No. 9 on the Billboard 200; Singles: "Life in Marvelous Times", "Quiet Dog Bite Hard", "Casa Bey" |
| June 9 | Kurupt & DJ Quik | BlaQKout | Debuted at No. 61 on the Billboard 200; Singles: "BlaQKout" |
| June 9 | Busdriver | Jhelli Beam | Failed to chart on the Billboard 200; Singles: "Me – Time" |
| June 10 | Various Artists | Mellow Beats, Friends & Lovers | |
| June 12 | Hilltop Hoods | State of the Art | Debuted at No. 1 on the ARIA Australian Top 50 Albums; Singles: "Chase That Feeling", "Still Standing", "The Light You Burned" |
| June 16 | Hussein Fatal | Born Legendary | Failed to chart on the Billboard 200; Singles: "Wut You Talkin Bout" |
| June 16 | Juicy J | Hustle Till I Die | Debuted at No. 106 on the Billboard 200 |
| June 16 | L.E.G.A.C.Y. | Suicide Music | Failed to chart on the Billboard 200 |
| June 16 | Street Sweeper Social Club | Street Sweeper Social Club | Debuted at No. 37 on the Billboard 200; Singles: "100 Little Curses" |
| June 23 | Fast Life Yungstaz | Jamboree | Debuted at No. 109 on the Billboard 200; Singles: "Swag Surfin'" |
| June 23 | Dead Prez & DJ Green Lantern | Pulse Of The People | Failed to chart on the Billboard 200, but debuted at No. 81 on the Top R&B/Hip-Hop Albums |
| June 23 | Playaz Circle | Flight 360: The Takeoff | Debuted at No. 74 on the Billboard 200; Singles: "Stupid", "Hold Up", "Can't Remember" |
| June 23 | Willy Northpole | Tha Connect | Failed to chart on the Billboard 200, but debuted at No. 47 on the Top R&B/Hip-Hop Albums and at No. 21 on the Top Rap Albums; Singles: "Body Marked Up", "Hood Dreamer", "#1 Side Chick" |
| June 23 | Soul Assassins | Intermission | Failed to chart on the Billboard 200; Singles: "Classical", "Gangsta Shit" |
| June 23 | U-God | Dopium | Failed to chart on the Billboard 200, but debuted at No. 93 on the Top R&B/Hip-Hop Albums; Singles: "Train Trussle" |
| June 23 | Grand Puba | Retroactive | Failed to chart on the Billboard 200, but debuted at No. 97 on the Top R&B/Hip-Hop Albums |
| June 23 | Sa-Ra Creative Partners | Nuclear Evolution: The Age of Love | Failed to chart on the Billboard 200 |
| June 30 | Maino | If Tomorrow Comes... | Debuted at No. 25 on the Billboard 200; Singles: "Hi Hater", "All the Above", "Hood Love", "Million Bucks" |
| June 30 | Ace Hood | Ruthless | Debuted at No. 23 on the Billboard 200; Singles: "Overtime", "Loco Wit the Cake", "Champion" |
| June 30 | Blaq Poet | Tha Blaqprint° | |
| June 30 | Wu-Tang Clan | Wu-Tang Chamber Music | |
| July 7 | The Alchemist | Chemical Warfare | Singles: "Lose Your Life", "Smile" |
| July 14 | Krizz Kaliko | Genius | Debuted at No. 85 on the Billboard 200; Singles: "Misunderstood" |
| July 14 | La Coka Nostra | A Brand You Can Trust | Debuted at No. 84 on the Billboard 200 |
| July 14 | Twista | Category F5 | Debuted at No. 8 on the Billboard 200; Singles: "Wetter", "Birthday" |
| July 14 | Yukmouth | The West Coast Don | Failed to chart on the Billboard 200 |
| July 14 | Hell Rell | Hell Up In the Bronx | Failed to chart on the Billboard 200 |
| July 14 | Chico DeBarge | Chico DeBarge | |
| July 21 | Eyedea & Abilities | By the Throat | |
| July 28 | Fabolous | Loso's Way | Debuted at No. 1 on the Billboard 200; Singles: "Throw It in the Bag", "My Time", "Everything, Everyday, Everywhere"; First album from Fabolous to debut at No. 1 on the Billboard 200 |
| July 28 | Lord Infamous, T-Rock & II Tone | Blood Money | Failed to chart on the Billboard 200 |
| August 4 | Dorrough | Dorrough Music | Debuted at No. 36 on the Billboard 200; Singles: "Walk That Walk","Ice Cream Paint Job" |
| August 11 | Slaughterhouse | Slaughterhouse | Debuted at No. 26 on the Billboard 200; Singles: "The One" |
| August 21 | Plague Language (Noah23, Baracuda, Livestock, The Main, Lord Kufu & Madadam) | Plague Language Compilation | |
| August 25 | Lil Wyte | The Bad Influence | Debuted at No. 104 on the Billboard 200 |
| August 31 | Pitbull | Rebelution | Debuted at No. 8 on the Billboard 200; Singles: "Krazy", "I Know You Want Me (Calle Ocho)", "Hotel Room Service", "Shut It Down" |
| August 31 | Killer Mike | Underground Atlanta | Failed to chart on the Billboard 200, but debuted at No. 34 on the Top R&B/Hip-Hop Albums and at No. 10 on the Top Rap Albums; Singles: "Imma Fool Wit It" |
| September 1 | Beanie Sigel | The Broad Street Bully | |
| September 1 | Insane Clown Posse | Bang! Pow! Boom! | Debuted at No. 4 on the Billboard 200 |
| September 8 | JAY Z | The Blueprint 3 | Debuted at No. 1 on the Billboard 200; Singles: "D.O.A. (Death of Auto-Tune)", "Run This Town", "Empire State of Mind", "On to the Next One", "Young Forever"; Certified Platinum; 11th album from Jay-Z to debuted at No. 1 on the Billboard 200 (9th album as a solo artist). |
| September 8 | Raekwon | Only Built 4 Cuban Linx... Pt. II | Debuted at No. 4 on the Billboard 200; Singles: "New Wu", "House Of Flying Daggers" |
| September 10 | Tede | Note2 | Debuts at No. 3 on the OLiS; Certified Gold in Poland |
| September 15 | Big Scoob | Monsterifik | |
| September 15 | Kid Cudi | Man on the Moon: The End of Day | Debuted at No. 4 on the Billboard 200; Singles: "Day 'n' Nite", "Make Her Say", "Pursuit of Happiness"; Certified Gold |
| September 15 | KRS-One & Buckshot | Survival Skills | Debuted at No. 200 on the Billboard 200; Singles: "Robot" |
| September 15 | Lil Boosie | Superbad: The Return of Boosie Bad Azz | Debuted at No. 7 on the Billboard 200; Singles: "Better Believe It" |
| September 15 | N.O.R.E. | S.O.R.E. | Failed to chart on the Billboard 200; Singles: "Move" |
| September 15 | New Boyz | Skinny Jeans and a Mic | Debuted at No. 56 on the Billboard 200; Singles: "You're a Jerk", "Tie Me Down" |
| September 15 | Trick Daddy | Finally Famous: Born a Thug, Still a Thug | Debuted at No. 34 on the Billboard 200; Singles: "Why They Jock" |
| September 21 | Dizzee Rascal | Tongue n' Cheek | Certified Platinum in the UK; Singles: "Dance Wiv Me", "Bonkers", "Holiday", "Dirtee Cash" |
| September 22 | CRUNK23 (Noah23 & Crunk Chris) | Spare Ribs for the Eve of Destruction | |
| September 22 | Esoteric | Saving Seamus Ryan | |
| September 22 | Famous Playaz (Noah23 & DS) | Feature Presentation | |
| September 22 | X-Raided | The Unforgiven Vol. 1: In The Beginning | Failed to debut on the Billboard 200 |
| September 25 | Del the Funky Homosapien | Automatik Statik | |
| September 29 | Mack 10 | Soft White | Debuted at No. 141 on the Billboard 200; Singles: "Big Balla", "So Sharp", "Mirror, Mirror" |
| September 29 | Ghostface Killah | Ghostdini: The Wizard of Poetry in Emerald City | Debuted at No. 28 on the Billboard 200; Singles: "Baby", "Forever", "Let's Stop Playin'", "Guest House" |
| September 29 | Warren G | The G Files | Failed to chart on the Billboard 200; Singles: "Ringtone", "Crush" |
| September 29 | Skyzoo | The Salvation | Debuted at No. 126 on the Billboard 200; Singles: "The Beautiful Decay", "Popularity" |
| September 29 | Stevie Stone | New Kid Comin | Failed to debut on Billboard 200 |
| September 29 | Various Artists | More than a Game (soundtrack) | |
| October 6 | Fat Joe | Jealous Ones Still Envy (J.O.S.E. 2) | Debuted at No. 73 on the Billboard 200; Singles: "One", "Aloha" |
| October 6 | Jim Jones & Webstar | The Rooftop | Failed to debut on Billboard 200; Singles: "Dancin on Me", "She Can Get It" |
| October 12 | Chipmunk | I Am Chipmunk | Singles: "Beast", "Chip Diddy Chip", "Diamond Rings", "Oopsy Daisy", "Look for Me" |
| October 13 | Kottonmouth Kings | Hidden Stash 420 | Failed to debut on Billboard 200; Singles: "Tangerine Sky" |
| October 13 | Snoop Doggy Dogg | Death Row: The Lost Sessions Vol. 1 | |
| October 20 | Royce da 5'9" | Street Hop | Debuted at No. 110 on the Billboard 200; Singles: "Shake This", "Part of Me", "New Money" |
| October 26 | Tech N9ne | K.O.D. | Debuted at No. 14 on the Billboard 200; Singles: "Leave Me Alone", "Show Me A God", "Strange Music Box" |
| October 27 | Doom | Unexpected Guests | |
| October 27 | Hopsin | Gazing at the Moonlight | |
| October 27 | Mike Epps | Funny Bidness: Da Album | Failed to debut on Billboard 200; Singles: "Big Girls", "Trying to Be a Gangsta", "Ain't Chu You" |
| October 27 | Triple C's | Custom Cars & Cycles | Debuted at No. 120 on the Billboard 200; Singles: "Go", "Errday" |
| October 27 | Swollen Members | Armed to the Teeth | Debuted at No. 146 on the Billboard 200; Singles: "Warrior", "Red Dragon", "Bollywood Chick", "Porn Star" |
| November 3 | Hell Rell | Live From Hell | Failed to debut on Billboard 200 |
| November 3 | Ol' Dirty Bastard | Message to the Other Side | Failed to debut on Billboard 200 |
| November 10 | Wale | Attention Deficit | Debuted at No. 21 on the Billboard 200; Singles: "Chillin'", "World Tour", "Pretty Girls" |
| November 17 | 50 Cent | Before I Self Destruct | Debuted at No. 5 on the Billboard 200; Released digitally on November 9; Singles: "Ok, You're Right", "Baby by Me", "Do You Think About Me"; Certified Gold |
| November 17 | Danny! | Where Is Danny? | Debuted at No. 189 on the Billboard 200; Singles: "Get Down" |
| November 17 | Felt | Felt 3: A Tribute to Rosie Perez | |
| November 17 | Pretty Ricky | Pretty Ricky | Debuted at No. 97 on the Billboard 200; Singles: "Tipsy (In Dis Club)", "Say a Command" |
| November 17 | Rakim | The Seventh Seal | Debuted at No. 67 on the Billboard 200; Singles: "Holy Are U", "Walk These Streets" |
| November 23 | Birdman | Priceless | Debuted at No. 29 on the Billboard 200; Singles: "Always Strapped", "Written on Her", "Money to Blow", "4 My Town (Play Ball)" |
| November 24 | Wiz Khalifa | Deal or No Deal | |
| November 27 | BlakRoc | BlakRoc | Debuted at No. 176 on the Billboard 200; Singles: "Ain't Nothing Like You (Hoochie Coo)" |
| December 1 | Juvenile | Cocky & Confident | Debuted at No. 43 on the Billboard 200; Singles: "Hands On You", "Gotta Get It", "We Be Getting Money" |
| December 1 | k-os | The Trill: A Journey so Far | |
| December 1 | Souls of Mischief | Montezuma's Revenge | |
| December 8 | B.G. | Too Hood 2 Be Hollywood | Debuted at No. 77 on the Billboard 200; Singles: "For a Minute", "Ya Heard Me", "My Hood" |
| December 8 | Clipse | Til the Casket Drops | Debuted at No. 41 on the Billboard 200; Singles: "Kinda Like a Big Deal", "I'm Good", "All Eyes on Me", "Popular Demand (Popeyes)" |
| December 8 | Gucci Mane | The State vs. Radric Davis | Debuted at No. 10 on the Billboard 200; Singles: "Wasted", "Spotlight", "Worst Enemy", "Heavy", "Lemonade" |
| December 8 | Snoop Dogg | Malice n Wonderland | Debuted at No. 23 on the Billboard 200; Singles: "Gangsta Luv", "That's Tha Homie", "I Wanna Rock", "Upside Down" |
| December 8 | Timbaland | Timbaland Presents Shock Value II | Debuted at No. 36 on the Billboard 200; Singles: "Morning After Dark", "Say Something", "Carry Out", "If We Ever Meet Again" |
| December 15 | Obie Trice & MoSS | Special Reserve | Failed to chart on the Billboard 200; Singles: "Got Hungry" |
| December 21 | Eminem | Relapse: Refill | Debuted at No. 1 on the Billboard 200; Singles: "Forever", "Hell Breaks Loose", "Elevator", "Music Box"; Certified 4× Platinum |
| December 21 | Hurricane Chris | Unleashed | Failed to chart on the Billboard 200, but debuted at No. 46 on the Top R&B/Hip-Hop Albums and at No. 20 on the Top Rap Albums; Singles: "Halle Berry (She's Fine)", "Headboard" |
| December 21 | Young Money Entertainment | We Are Young Money | Debuted at No. 9 on the Billboard 200; Singles: "Every Girl", "BedRock", "Roger That"; Certified Gold |
| December 25 | Tyler, the Creator | Bastard | Ranked at number 32 on Pitchfork's list of the Top 50 Albums of 2010 |

== Highest-charting singles ==
Hip hop singles from any year which charted in the 2009 Top 40 of the Billboard Hot 100
| Song | Artist | Project | Peak position |
|---|---|---|---|
| "Empire State of Mind" | Jay-Z featuring Alicia Keys | The Blueprint 3 | 1 |
| "Right Round" | Flo Rida featuring Ke$ha | R.O.O.T.S. | 1 |
| "Crack a Bottle" | Eminem, Dr. Dre & 50 Cent | Relapse | 1 |
| "Best I Ever Had" | Drake | So Far Gone | 2 |
| "Replay" | Iyaz | Replay | 2 |
| "Run This Town" | Jay-Z featuring Kanye West & Rihanna | The Blueprint 3 | 2 |
| "Heartless" | Kanye West | 808s & Heartbreak | 2 |
| "Dead and Gone" | T.I. featuring Justin Timberlake | Paper Trail | 2 |
| "Day 'n' Nite" | Kid Cudi | Man on the Moon: The End of Day | 3 |
| "Sugar" | Flo Rida featuring Wynter Gordon | R.O.O.T.S. | 5 |
| "Forever" | Drake featuring Kanye West, Lil Wayne & Eminem | Music Inspired by More than a Game | 8 |
| "We Made You" | Eminem featuring Charmagne Tripp | Relapse | 9 |
| "I Love College" | Asher Roth | Asleep In The Bread Aisle | 12 |
| "Throw It in the Bag" | Fabolous featuring The-Dream | Loso's Way | 14 |
| "Prom Queen" | Lil Wayne featuring Shanell | Rebirth | 15 |
| "Successful" | Drake featuring Trey Songz & Lil Wayne | So Far Gone | 17 |
| "Beautiful" | Eminem | Relapse | 17 |
| "Be on You" | Flo Rida featuring Ne-Yo | R.O.O.T.S. | 19 |
| "Pop Champagne" | Jim Jones & Ron Browz featuring Juelz Santana | Pray IV Reign | 22 |
| "Tie Me Down" | New Boyz featuring Ray J | Skinny Jeanz and a Mic | 22 |
| "D.O.A. (Death of Autotune)" | Jay-Z | The Blueprint 3 | 24 |
| "You’re a Jerk" | New Boyz | Skinny Jeanz and a Mic | 24 |
| "Old Time's Sake" | Eminem featuring Dr. Dre | Relapse | 25 |
| "Money to Blow" | Birdman featuring Lil Wayne & Drake | Priceless | 26 |
| "Baby By Me" | 50 Cent featuring Ne-Yo | Before I Self Destruct | 28 |
| "Hell Breaks Loose" | Eminem featuring Dr. Dre | Relapse: Refill | 29 |
| "Remember Me" | T.I. featuring Mary J. Blige | Paper Trail: Case Closed | 29 |
| "3 a.m." | Eminem | Relapse | 32 |
| "Hot Revolver" | Lil Wayne | —N/a | 33 |
| "Gangsta Luv" | Snoop Dogg featuring The-Dream | Malice n Wonderland | 35 |
| "Wasted" | Gucci Mane featuring Plies | The State vs. Radric Davis | 36 |
| "I'm Going In" | Drake featuring Lil Wayne & Young Jeezy | So Far Gone | 40 |
| "Good Morning" | Chamillionaire | —N/a | 40 |

== Highest first week sales ==
As of December 31, 2009.

| Number | Artist | Album | 1st week sales | 1st week position |
|---|---|---|---|---|
| 1 | Eminem | Relapse | 608,000 | #1 |
| 2 | Jay-Z | The Blueprint 3 | 476,000 | #1 |
| 3 | 50 Cent | Before I Self Destruct | 160,000 | #5 |
| 4 | Rick Ross | Deeper Than Rap | 158,000 | #1 |
| 5 | Young Money | We Are Young Money | 142,000 | #9 |
| 6 | Jadakiss | The Last Kiss | 134,000 | #3 |
| 7 | Kid Cudi | Man on the Moon: The End of Day | 104,000 | #4 |
| 8 | Fabolous | Loso's Way | 99,000 | #1 |
| 9 | Gucci Mane | The State vs. Radric Davis | 90,000 | #10 |
| 10 | UGK | UGK 4 Life | 76,000 | #6 |

== Highest critically reviewed albums (Metacritic) ==
| Number | Artist | Album | Average score | Number of reviews | Reference |
|---|---|---|---|---|---|
| 1 | Raekwon | Only Built 4 Cuban Linx... Pt. II | 88 | 19 reviews | |
| 2 | UGK | UGK 4 Life | 84 | 11 reviews | |
| 3 | DJ Quik | Blaqkout | 83 | 8 reviews | |
| 4 | Brother Ali | Us | 83 | 28 reviews | |
| 5 | Mos Def | The Ecstatic | 81 | 28 reviews | |
| 6 | J Dilla | Jay Stay Paid | 81 | 15 reviews | |
| 7 | Method Man & Redman | Blackout! 2 | 79 | 17 reviews | |
| 8 | Q-Tip | Kamaal/The Abstract | 78 | 13 reviews | |
| 9 | Wale | Attention Deficit | 77 | 21 reviews | |
| 10 | Doom | Born Like This | 77 | 21 reviews | |

== See also ==
- Previous article: 2008 in hip-hop
- Next article: 2010 in hip-hop
