= Beautiful (Eminem song) =

Single by Eminem

from the album Relapse
- Released: August 11, 2009
- Genre: Conscious hip-hop; rap rock
- Length: 6:32 (album version); 4:00 (radio edit); 6:37 (instrumental version)
- Label: Aftermath; Shady; Interscope
- Songwriters: Marshall Mathers; Luis Resto; Jeffrey Bass; Don Black; Andy Hill
- Producers: Eminem; Jeff Bass

Eminem singles chronology
"3 a.m." (2009)	"Beautiful" (2009)	"Forever" (2009)

Music video
- "Beautiful" on YouTube

"Beautiful" is the fifth and final single from American rapper Eminem's sixth studio album Relapse, released on August 11, 2009. The song samples "Reaching Out", originally recorded by British rock band Rock Therapy. This version of "Reaching Out" is taken from the Queen + Paul Rodgers 2005–2006 tour, which used Eminem's "Lose Yourself" as the house music.

The song was partially written during the first time Eminem went to rehab. After he got clean, he added a third verse to the song and released it on Relapse.

== Music video ==
The video was shot in Detroit and was directed by Anthony Mandler. It premiered on July 2, 2009, on Yahoo Music. The video opens with captions stating that "In 1950, Michigan was 1 of 8 states in America that collectively produced 36% of the world's GNP" and that "Detroit was the greatest manufacturing city in the world." It then cuts to present-day images of the city, featuring Eminem walking through three abandoned structures from that era: Michigan Central Station; the former Packard plant; and Tiger Stadium, including demolition footage of the latter. In each location, he is joined by several people appropriate to each building: an older woman with a suitcase, several autoworkers holding their lunchboxes and tools, and a neighborhood youth baseball team, respectively.

== Critical reception ==
Rolling Stone called the song a "touching attempt at an inspirational ballad". Pitchfork stated, "Relapse hits something of a stride with 'Beautiful'". "Beautiful" scored Eminem his ninth straight Top 40 single on the Billboard Hot 100, going back to "Smack That" with Akon. Billboard called the song "epic" and described it as "part confessional ('I'm just so fucking depressed', begins the track's explicit version) and part 'Lose Yourself'-style motivational anthem, 'Beautiful' encapsulates the introspective nature of 'Relapse' but deviates from the shock tactics that dominate the album", adding that "The song is as much a lighters-in-the-air, arena rock power ballad as it is a lyrical showcase". The song was nominated at the 52nd Grammy Awards in the Best Rap Solo Performance category but lost to Jay-Z's "D.O.A. (Death of Auto-Tune)".

== Chart performance ==
"Beautiful" entered the UK Singles Chart on May 17, 2009, at number 38 and re-entered at number 31 due to increased airplay. The song was released as the third UK single after "We Made You" and peaked at number 12. It became Eminem's 21st Top 40 single in the UK but also his second official single to miss the Top 10. In the U.S., it debuted at #17 on the Billboard Hot 100. The song was on the A-List of the BBC Radio 1 playlist. In the week of July 23, 2009, it re-entered the Hot 100 at #98.

== Awards and nominations ==
Year	Ceremony	Award	Result
2010	Grammy Awards	Best Rap Solo Performance	Nominated
2010	Much Music Video Awards	International Video of the Year	Nominated

== Track listing ==
Digital download
No.	Title	Writer(s)	Producer(s)	Length
1.	"Beautiful"	Marshall Mathers; Luis Resto; Jeffrey Bass; Don Black; Andy Hill	Eminem, Jeff Bass	6:32

Digital single
No.	Title	Writer(s)	Producer(s)	Length
1.	"Beautiful"	Marshall Mathers; Luis Resto; Jeffrey Bass; Don Black; Andy Hill	Eminem, Jeff Bass	6:32
2.	"Beautiful" (music video)	Mathers; Resto; Bass; Black; Hill	Eminem, Jeff Bass	4:21
Total length:				10:53

CD single
No.	Title	Writer(s)	Producer(s)	Length
1.	"Beautiful"	Marshall Mathers; Luis Resto; Jeffrey Bass; Don Black; Andy Hill	Eminem, Jeff Bass	6:32
2.	"3 a.m." (Travis Barker remix)	Mathers; Andre Young; Dawaun Parker; Mark Batson; Mike Elizondo; Trevor Lawrence, Jr.	Dr. Dre	5:20
Total length:				11:52

Digital EP
No.	Title	Writer(s)	Producer(s)	Length
1.	"Beautiful" (radio edit)	Marshall Mathers; Luis Resto; Jeffrey Bass; Don Black; Andy Hill	Eminem, Jeff Bass	4:00
2.	"Beautiful"	Mathers; Resto; Bass; Black; Hill	Eminem, Jeff Bass	6:32
3.	"Beautiful" (instrumental)	Mathers; Resto; Bass; Black; Hill	Eminem, Jeff Bass	6:37
4.	"3 a.m." (Travis Barker remix)	Mathers; Andre Young; Dawaun Parker; Mark Batson; Mike Elizondo; Trevor Lawrence, Jr.	Dr. Dre	5:20
Total length:				22:29

== Personnel ==
Credits adapted from Relapse digital booklet.

- Songwriters: M. Mathers, L. Resto, J. Bass, D. Black, A. Hill
- Recorded by: Mike Strange at 54 Sound in Ferndale, Michigan
- Assistant engineers: Tony Campana at 54 Sound in Ferndale, Michigan
- Mixed by: Eminem and Mike Strange at Effigy Studios
- Keyboards by: Jeffrey Bass and Luis Resto
- Bass and guitar by: Jeffrey Bass
- Samples: Contains samples from "Reaching Out" by Queen + Paul Rodgers, written by Don Black and Andy Hill

== Charts ==
Chart (2009)	Peak position
Australia (ARIA)	33
Austria (Ö3 Austria Top 40)	11
Belgium (Ultratip Bubbling Under Flanders)	16
Canada Hot 100 (Billboard)	8
Denmark (Tracklisten)	40
European Hot 100 Singles (Billboard)	26
Germany (GfK)	39
Ireland (IRMA)	5
New Zealand (Recorded Music NZ)	4
Scottish Singles Sales (Official Charts)	6
Sweden (Sverigetopplistan)	47
Switzerland (Schweizer Hitparade)	8
UK Hip Hop/R&B (Official Charts)	7
UK Singles (Official Charts)	12
US Billboard Hot 100	17
US Pop Airplay (Billboard)	35
US Rhythmic Airplay (Billboard)	32

=== Year-end charts ===
Chart (2009)	Position
New Zealand Singles Chart	40
UK Singles Chart	173

== Certifications ==
Region	Certification	Certified units/sales
Australia (ARIA)	3× Platinum	210,000^{‡}
Brazil (Pro-Música Brasil)	Platinum	60,000^{‡}
Denmark (IFPI Danmark)	Gold	45,000^{‡}
New Zealand (RMNZ)	2× Platinum	60,000^{‡}
United Kingdom (BPI)	Platinum	600,000^{‡}
United States (RIAA)	3× Platinum	3,000,000^{‡}
^{‡} Sales+streaming figures based on certification alone.
