= Music Box (song) =

Song by Eminem

from the album Relapse: Refill
- Released: December 21, 2009
- Recorded: 2008
- Genre: Horrorcore
- Length: 5:05
- Label: Aftermath; Shady; Interscope
- Songwriters: Marshall Mathers; Andre Young; Mark Batson; Dawaun Parker; Trevor Lawrence, Jr.
- Producer: Dr. Dre

"Music Box" is a song by American rapper Eminem, featured on his 2009 album Relapse: Refill, the reissue of his album Relapse.

== Content and production ==
In the song Eminem raps through the eyes of a sadistic killer who likens his prey to a delicious meal, fueled by the haunting sound of his music box. The production was praised as "minimalistic, which consists simply of deep bass thump and a looping toy-chest's song, which provides the perfect backdrop for Eminem's ferocious delivery."

== Track listing ==
iTunes digital single

No.	Title	Writer(s)	Producer(s)	Length
1.	"Music Box"	Marshall Mathers; Andre Young; Mark Batson; Dawaun Parker; Trevor Lawrence, Jr.	Dr. Dre; Dawaun Parker	5:05

== Charts ==
Chart (2010)	Peak position
U.S. Billboard Hot 100	82
Canada (Canadian Hot 100)	63
