= 3 a.m. (Eminem song) =

- Travis Barker remix cover

Single by Eminem

from the album Relapse
- Released: April 23, 2009
- Genre: Horrorcore
- Length: 5:19
- Label: Aftermath; Shady; Interscope
- Songwriters: Marshall Mathers; Dawaun Parker; Mark Batson; Mike Elizondo; Trevor Lawrence, Jr.
- Producer: Dr. Dre

Eminem singles chronology
"We Made You" (2009)	"3 a.m." (2009)	"Beautiful" (2009)

Music video
- "3 a.m." on YouTube

Audio sample
- file; help

"3 a.m." is a song by American rapper Eminem as the third single from his album Relapse. The single was produced by Dr. Dre. It was released onto the iTunes Store on April 28, 2009. A music video followed on May 2, 2009, via Cinemax. The song was later included on Eminem's second greatest-hits album Curtain Call 2.

== Concept ==
Eminem raps from the perspective of a serial killer questioning his own sanity and recalling a string of murders. The song, according to Eminem, is said to be closer to the overall sound of the album, as opposed to the poppy, fun-poking "We Made You". It's meant to be an ode to his fascination with horror movie characters such as Freddy Krueger and Hannibal Lecter. It features Eminem presumably rapping from the perspective of his alter ego Slim Shady, using both internal and multi-syllabic rhyme schemes in his three verses. The song contains a line from The Silence of the Lambs ('She puts the lotion in the bucket, she puts the lotion on her skin. She puts the lotion in the bucket, she puts the lotion on her skin, or else she will get the hose again.'). This is the third time Eminem uses a reference to The Silence of the Lambs, to which Eminem also referred in the D12 song "American Psycho" from Devil's Night and the music video for "You Don't Know" from The Re-Up. He later referenced the movie again in the track "Buffalo Bill" from Relapse: Refill. The beginning of the song uses a sample of "Ghost of Love" by Timeless Legend. The song has a much darker concept than most of Relapse's songs, which are generally more humorous, which sets it aside greatly from much of the album. The censored version removes references to killing or murder, but the music video keeps the words in.

== Reception ==
The song received critical acclaim. Simon Vozick-Levinson of Entertainment Weekly gave the song a positive review, writing, "This is, more or less, the Eminem I've been waiting for. (...) Nobody finds poetry in violence and perviness like Marshall". While noting that "he's still rapping in a silly accent for some reason," Vozick-Levinson concluded that "He's a majorly offensive verbal acrobat, the world's most eloquent sociopath." AllMusic chose it as a track pick also.

== Chart performance ==
"3 a.m." debuted at number 32 on the Billboard Hot 100, selling 66,000 downloads in its first week.

== Music video ==
On Shade 45, Eminem announced that shooting for the video had been entirely complete and was shot in Detroit, Michigan, at 3 a.m. with director Syndrome, who also worked on the video for "Crack a Bottle". It premiered on Cinemax on May 2, right before the movie The Strangers. It follows Eminem playing a serial killer who is escaping from a rehabilitation clinic and killing everyone who might try to stop him. The video takes place at Popsomp Hills Rehabilitation Center in Detroit; the name of a fake rehabilitation clinic, which serves as a viral campaign for the release of Relapse. The music video shows murder victims laying bloody, beaten and helpless after what seems to be a killing spree performed by Eminem's alter ego, Slim Shady. The song and video suggest that it has a Dr. Jekyll and Mr. Hyde theme, with Eminem as the good side and Slim Shady as the evil side. Slim Shady roams the halls of Popsomp Hills at 3:00 am and violently slaughters members of the staff on duty and warns the audience: "It's 3 a.m. and here I come so you should probably run." Eminem is also shown watching the music video to "Crack a Bottle" on a television, which is also directed by Syndrome. New York magazine described the video as a revival of the "torture porn" subgenre of horror films. It was voted the fourth best video of 2009 by Fuse TV.

== Travis Barker remix ==
Blink-182 drummer Travis Barker remixed the track on May 29, 2009, and it was released via his YouTube account, as well as on Eminem's official website. According to an interview with RapRadar, Travis Barker explained how the song came about, saying that "Paul [Rosenberg] had hit me up and said that Em kind of heard in his head some sort of rock remix for it. They let me have a stab at it and then the rest is history." He also stated that "it's going to be available on Eminem.com for like some special release." It was released onto iTunes on August 11, 2009, and also included on the "Beautiful" CD single and digital EP. The Travis Barker remix has received extensive play on Los Angeles rock and alternative radio station KROQ-FM.

== Track listing ==
Digital download

No.	Title	Writer(s)	Producer(s)	Length
1.	"3 a.m."	Marshall Mathers; Andre Young; Dawaun Parker; Mark Batson; Mike Elizondo; Trevor Lawrence, Jr.	Dr. Dre	5:19

Digital download – remix single

No.	Title	Writer(s)	Producer(s)	Length
1.	"3 a.m." (Travis Barker remix)	Marshall Mathers; Andre Young; Dawaun Parker; Mark Batson; Mike Elizondo; Trevor Lawrence, Jr.	Dr. Dre	5:02

Promotional CD single

No.	Title	Writer(s)	Producer(s)	Length
1.	"3 a.m."	Marshall Mathers; Andre Young; Dawaun Parker; Mark Batson; Mike Elizondo; Trevor Lawrence, Jr.	Dr. Dre	5:19

== Personnel ==
- Mike Elizondo – guitar, bass, keyboards
- Mark Batson – keyboards
- Dawaun Parker – keyboards
- Trevor Lawrence, Jr. – keyboards

== Charts ==
Chart (2009)	Peak position
Australia (ARIA)	38
Brazil (ABPD)	63
Canada (Canadian Hot 100)	24
UK Singles (The Official Charts Company)	56
US Billboard Hot 100	32
US Pop 100 (Billboard)	37

== Certifications ==
Region	Certification	Certified units/sales
Australia (ARIA)	Gold	35,000^{‡}
United States (RIAA)	Gold	500,000^{‡}
^{‡} Sales+streaming figures based on certification alone.
