= I Get It In =

I Get It In may refer to:

- "I Get It In" (50 Cent song), 2009
- "I Get It In" (Omarion song), 2009
