= Old Time's Sake =

Promotional single by Eminem featuring Dr. Dre

from the album Relapse
- Released: June 2, 2009 (digital)
- Studio: Effigy Studios (Ferndale, Michigan)
- Genre: Hip-hop; gangsta rap
- Length: 4:38
- Label: Aftermath; Shady; Interscope
- Songwriters: Marshall Mathers; Andre Young; Mark Batson; Dawaun Parker; Trevor Lawrence
- Producer: Dr. Dre

"Old Time's Sake" is a song by American rapper Eminem featuring fellow American rapper and producer Dr. Dre, and the only promotional single from the former's Relapse (2009).

== Background ==
News of the song's future release was first published on the official Eminem site on April 30, 2009, as a part of the official countdown. The song features and is also produced by Dr. Dre. It is one of the only two songs on the album to have guest appearances; the other song, "Crack a Bottle", also features Dr. Dre, as well as 50 Cent.

== Reception ==
The song received mixed reviews from critics. MTV summarized "Old Time's Sake" as "featuring a party vibe". The article went on to describe that "the record has the familiar West Coast bounce, and that Dr. Dre himself leads the song with a 'simple sing-songy flow' as well as adult content." AllMusic highlighted the song. The Guardian was negative: "More troubling is the sense of going through the motions - something that comes with the album's attempts to scandalise, and which seems to have seeped through into the song title". Louis Pattison was also negative: "'Old Time's Sake' with Dre heralds a mid-album slump." Pitchfork was really positive: "the mere fact he's working with Dr. Dre is seen as cause for celebration (the entirety of "Old Time's Sake" is great)." Rolling Stone wrote that the song is "where Dre drops tasteless lines about getting Shady stoned again."

== Track listing ==
Digital single

No.	Title	Writer(s)	Producer(s)	Length
1.	"Old Time's Sake" (feat. Dr. Dre)	Eminem, Dr. Dre, Mark Batson, Dawaun Parker, Trevor Lawrence	Dr. Dre, Mark Batson	4:38

== Personnel ==
- Eric "Jesus" Coomes – guitar, bass
- Mark Batson – keyboards
- Dawaun Parker – keyboards
- Trevor Lawrence – keyboards

== Charts ==
Chart (2009)	Peak position
Australia (ARIA)	76
Canada (Canadian Hot 100)	14
Ireland (IRMA)	49
UK Singles (The Official Charts Company)	61
US Billboard Hot 100 (Billboard)	25
US Bubbling Under R&B/Hip-Hop Singles (Billboard)	15
US Pop 100 (Billboard)	31
