= I Get It In (50 Cent song) =

Single by 50 Cent

from the album Before I Self Destruct (intended)
- Released: January 15, 2009; February 10, 2009 (iTunes release)
- Recorded: 2008
- Genre: Hip-hop
- Length: 3:21 (album version); 3:04 (radio edit)
- Label: Aftermath; Shady; Interscope; Universal
- Songwriters: C. Jackson; Mark Batson
- Producers: Dr. Dre; Mark Batson

50 Cent singles chronology
"Get Up" (2008)	"I Get It In" (2009)	"Crack a Bottle" (2009)

"I Get It In" is a song by rapper 50 Cent. It was initially released as the official second single from Before I Self Destruct, but it was later replaced by "Do You Think About Me".

== Background ==
The instrumental for "I Get It In" was originally made for Eminem; Dr. Dre, the track's producer, gave it to Eminem during studio sessions in 2008. According to 50 Cent, the track came into his possession after finding it on one of Eminem's personal computers (whilst visiting Eminem's home city of Detroit to record music) and deciding he wanted to keep it for himself; he promptly began writing lyrics to the track. Eminem was impressed with the results and gave 50 Cent his blessing to keep the track for himself, reportedly telling 50 Cent "You gotta keep that for yourself. This is too crazy".

The unmixed version was leaked by Hot 97's Funkmaster Flex on January 5. The mix version was originally posted for a January 12 release date but was delayed to January 15 for unknown reason. The single was first released to 50 Cent's official personal internet community. The song was officially released to online music stores on February 10, 2009. The single was released online one week after his single "Crack a Bottle" with Eminem and Dr. Dre. Aftermath Entertainment collaborator Dawaun Parker has stated that he is also featured on the song. The song contains a sample of Alexander O'Neal's 1985 hit "Saturday Love".

== Track listing ==
Digital single

No.	Title	Writer(s)	Producer(s)	Length
1.	"I Get It In" (album version)	C. Jackson, A. Young, M. Batson, D. Parker	Dr. Dre, Mark Batson	3:21

== Chart performance ==
After the week of the song's release, the single debuted on the Billboard Hot R&B/Hip-Hop Songs at #64, since then it has peaked at #43. On the Hot Rap Tracks it peaked at #16. On the Billboard Rhythmic Top 40 it peaked at #33. On the Billboard Mainstream R&B/Hip-Hop chart it peaked at #29. After its iTunes release it made a "Hot Shot Debut" at #53 on the Billboard Hot 100 based on downloads. In Canada it debuted at #52 on the Canadian Hot 100 based on digital downloads.

== Charts ==
Chart (2009)	Peak position
Canada Hot 100 (Billboard)	52
UK Hip Hop/R&B (Official Charts)	20
UK Singles (Official Charts)	75
US Billboard Hot 100	53
US Hot R&B/Hip-Hop Songs (Billboard)	43
US Pop 100 (Billboard)	56
US Rhythmic Airplay (Billboard)	31
