= Relapse (Eminem album) =

2009 studio album

- Standard artwork (Note: The Refill edition features the same artwork but with a white background.)

Studio album by Eminem
- Released: May 15, 2009
- Recorded: 2005–2009
- Studios: 54 Sound (Ferndale, Michigan); Effigy (Ferndale, Michigan); KDS (Orlando); Phantom City (Orlando); Record One (Los Angeles); Studio at the Palms (Las Vegas)
- Genres: Horrorcore; hip-hop
- Length: 76:05
- Labels: Shady; Goliath; Aftermath; WEB; Interscope
- Producers: Eminem; Dr. Dre (exec.); Doc Ish; Dawaun Parker; Jeff Bass; Mark Batson; Boi-1da; Trevor Lawrence, Jr.

Eminem chronology
Curtain Call: The Hits (2005)	Relapse (2009)	Recovery (2010)

Singles from Relapse
- 1. "Crack a Bottle" Released: February 2, 2009; 2. "We Made You" Released: April 7, 2009; 3. "3 a.m." Released: April 23, 2009; 4. "Old Time's Sake" Released: June 2, 2009; 5. "Beautiful" Released: August 11, 2009

Relapse is the sixth studio album by the American rapper Eminem. It was released on May 15, 2009, through Shady Records, Goliath Artists, Aftermath Entertainment, WEB Entertainment, and Interscope Records. It was Eminem's first studio album after a hiatus following Encore (2004), due to writer's block and an addiction to prescription sleeping medication. Eminem's mentor Dr. Dre produced every track except for "Beautiful", which Eminem produced himself. Guest appearances include Dr. Dre and 50 Cent; a reissue, released on December 21, adds Drake, Kanye West, and Lil Wayne.

Relapse is a horrorcore album about drug rehabilitation and relapse. It features the return of Eminem's Slim Shady alter ego, and Eminem described it as reminiscent of The Slim Shady LP (1999) and The Marshall Mathers LP (2000). The concept album features Eminem as a serial killer using various accents, and includes skits with performances from Dominic West, Paul Rosenberg, and Angela Yee, among others.

Relapse was promoted with five singles: "Crack a Bottle" (which topped the US Billboard Hot 100), "We Made You", "3 a.m.", "Old Time's Sake", and "Beautiful". It received mixed reviews; critics generally praised its production, but were divided over the writing and criticized Eminem's accents. Nonetheless, Relapse won Best Rap Album at the 52nd Annual Grammy Awards, while "Crack a Bottle" won for Best Rap Performance by a Duo or Group. While Eminem expressed dissatisfaction with Relapse following its release, it developed a cult following and underwent a critical reevaluation; it is now regarded as one of Eminem's best albums, with praise for its humor, performances, and creativity.

One of the most anticipated albums of 2009, Relapse debuted atop the US Billboard 200, with 608,000 copies sold in its first week, staying at top for two weeks. It also reached number one in 12 other countries. In 2022, it was certified triple platinum by the Recording Industry Association of America (RIAA). A sequel called Relapse 2 was planned, but canceled in favor of Recovery (2010).

== Background ==
After releasing Encore in 2004, Eminem planned to take some time off from recording his own music to become a hip-hop producer for other rap acts, especially for the artists signed on his own label, Shady Records. However, Eminem entered his hiatus earlier than expected after cancelling the European leg of the Anger Management Tour in the summer of 2005 because of exhaustion and an addiction to prescription sleeping drugs. Eminem faced a number of setbacks in 2006, with his remarriage to former wife Kimberly Scott lasting only eleven weeks before a second divorce, while his best friend and fellow rapper Proof was later shot and killed during an altercation outside a Detroit nightclub. Devastated, Eminem relapsed into prescription drug abuse and became increasingly reclusive. In a June 2009 interview for XXL, Eminem elaborated on the impact of Proof's death on him, stating that while it affected many people, he experienced the loss in a personal way. He described becoming overwhelmed by grief and being in a "dark place" marked by increased drug use, which worsened his depression and self-perception.

Speculation on an upcoming album by Eminem which was named King Mathers confirmed by Cashis and many different leaks, was reported since early 2007 from announcements made by artists 50 Cent and Stat Quo, former members of Shady Records. Also, rapper Bizarre – a member of the hip-hop group D12 – stated that the release of the group's third studio album was on hold because Interscope Records wanted to release Eminem's album first. By the end of the year, additional musicians associated with Shady Records – including The Alchemist, Bishop Lamont, Cashis and Obie Trice – had confirmed on different occasions that the rapper was effectively working on a new album. On September 12, 2007, during a call at the radio station WQHT Hot 97, Eminem stated that he was in limbo and was not sure whether he would release any new material in the near future. He then elaborated that at that point he was constantly working in the recording studio and had come to terms with his personal issues. However, in December 2007, he was hospitalized because of an overdose of methadone that nearly killed him. In early 2008, he began a 12-step program to recover from his addiction; in a later interview, he said that he got sober on April 20, 2008. He has stayed sober since then.

== Recording ==
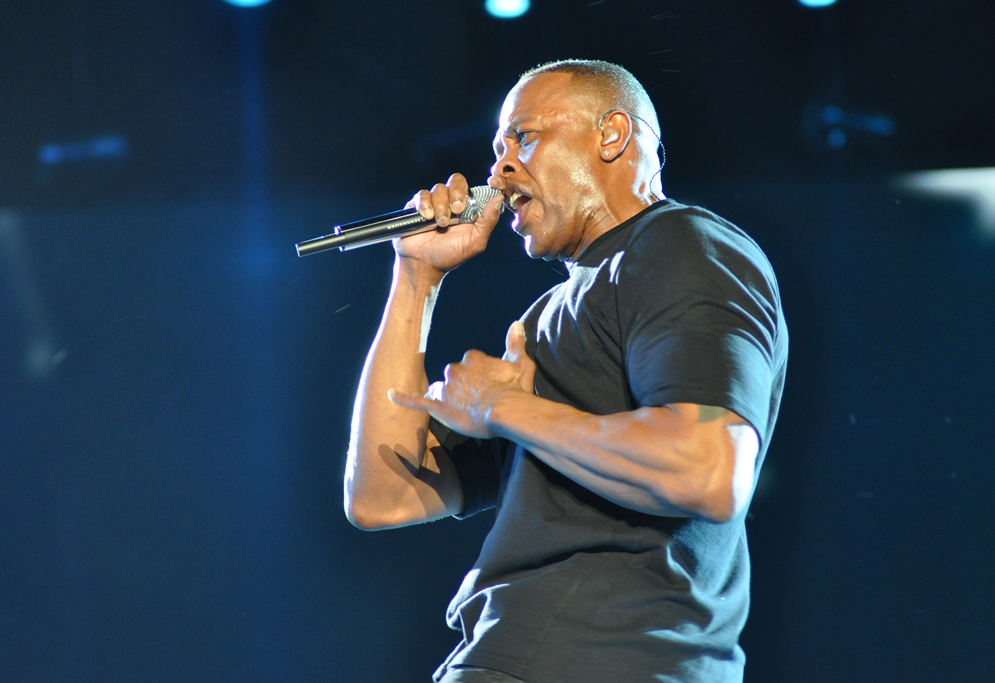
Dr. Dre (pictured in 2012) provided the vast majority of production for the album.

Eminem continued recording throughout 2005 and released most of this work on his Shady Records compilation album Eminem Presents: The Re-Up. He also wrote a track called "Beautiful" when he was in rehab, finishing it after he left, which later became the fifth and final single on Relapse. Eminem began the recording stages of Relapse in mid-2008, after completing a 12-step program to control his drug addiction. Record producer and long-time Detroit collaborator Jeff Bass of the Bass Brothers worked with Eminem on 25 tracks, two years after the rapper had received treatment for his sleeping pill addiction in 2005. Depressed by Proof's death, Eminem fell into a period of "writer's block", where he felt everything he wrote was not worth recording. To compensate for this, Bass chose to follow a production style that would allow the artist to rap "off the top of his head, as opposed to writing a story". Eminem would then freestyle or record vocals one line at a time before interrupting and then recording another line. At the same time, according to Eminem's song rights supervisor Joel Martin, the rapper began to collect additional songs without noticing it. He would often record or produce material initially intended for the musical projects of other artists but end up with tracks he really liked.

Eminem purchased the Effigy Studio in Ferndale, Michigan, in 2007, and ended his working relationship with much of his former production team of the 54 Sound recording studio, including the Bass Brothers. In September 2007, Dr. Dre stated his intention to dedicate two months to the production of King Mathers. Working with Dr. Dre allowed Eminem to concentrate on the processes of songwriting rather than the production, which was largely taken care of by the former. The rapper justified his choice of using Dr. Dre for the vast majority of the production due to their long collaborative history and a musical "chemistry" they both shared. This allowed the rapper to pick the beats from Dr. Dre's catalog that challenged him rhythm-wise to experiment with different flows. The making of the album progressed at the Effigy Studio up to a year after, as recording sessions were then moved to Orlando, Florida, in July or August 2008. By then, Eminem had begun to start writing verses again at such a pace that he often took more time to record the lyrics than write them. He credited sobriety for his new creative run, acknowledging that his mind was free of the clutter that "blocked" him during his drug abuse in the last years. Dr. Dre would start the song-writing process by giving a number of his beats on a CD to Eminem, who in a separate room in the studio would listen and select the ones he preferred and inspired him the most. Eminem would then write lyrics to the instrumentals, while Dr. Dre and his production staff continued to create new music. Once he felt he had written lyrics for enough songs, Eminem would dedicate an entire day to record his songs to the point that he would lose his voice for the following days. At that point, he would then begin to write lyrics for new songs. The process continued for the next six months and allowed Eminem to have enough material for a second album, initially called Relapse 2, which evolved to Recovery (2010).

During this recording period, a handful of songs intended for Relapse were leaked on the Internet, including an incomplete version of "Crack a Bottle". The song was finished in January 2009 and featured vocals from Dr. Dre and 50 Cent. Despite the leak, the album was being completed in a state of near-total secrecy, according to the British newspaper The Independent. Even Polydor Records, the multinational owner of Interscope, had no information on the album at the time. On April 23, Eminem suggested he and possibly Dr. Dre were the only ones in possession of the final copy of Relapse; his manager Paul Rosenberg added that even Eminem's record labels were not in possession of the music less than a month before its release to prevent possible bootlegging.

== Music and lyrics ==
"3 a.m."
The song was produced by Dr. Dre and features Eminem lyrically depicting himself as a murderer of several people.

In an interview for XXL, Eminem described the concept behind Relapse to be the ending of his drug rehabilitation and thus rap as if he was on drugs again, as well as the return of his fictional alter-ego Slim Shady. According to the interviewer Datwon Thomas, Eminem's influences for the album came from his own past drug issues and from television shows and documentaries involving crime and serial killers, as the rapper was fascinated by "serial killers and their psyche and their mind states". In a May 2009 interview for The New York Times, Eminem discussed his view of serial killers, stating:

"You listen to these people talk, or you see them, they look so regular. What does a serial killer look like? He don't look like anything. He looks like you. You could be living next door to one. If I lived next door to you, you could be."

Music critic Robert Christgau interpreted the opening line to the album featuring the phrase "horror corridor" as Eminem telling listeners that it is a horrorcore album. Ben Kaplan of the Vancouver Courier also categorized it as a horrorcore album. Ann Powers of the Los Angeles Times said that the album's "horrorcore scenes" show Eminem as "a madman created by the hypocrisy of therapy". Music journalist Rob Sheffield remarked on its sensationalist drug references and said that Relapse is "a hip-hop version" of comedian Richard Pryor's Live on the Sunset Strip (1982).

=== Songs ===
Relapse opens with the skit "Dr. West", where actor Dominic West voices a drug counselor who becomes creepier as the skit goes on and turns out to be Slim Shady, his alter ego who comes back after faking his death to possess Eminem to bring back his career. The skit leads to "3 a.m.", where Eminem depicts himself as a serial killer during a murder spree. When "3 a.m." was released as a single prior to the album's own release, Eminem noted that the song closely mirrored what he believed was the overall dark tone of the album. On "My Mom", the rapper traces his addictive tendencies to his mother and shows how he became a drug addict just like her. Eminem continues his family tales on "Insane", where he imagines himself as a victim of child sexual abuse. For Eminem, the goal of "Insane" was to make song that would disgust the listeners and "make them puke", adding that he came up with this idea after thinking of the song's first line ("I was born with a dick in my brain/Yeah, fucked in the head"). Mariah Carey and her then-husband Nick Cannon are targeted in "Bagpipes from Baghdad", where Eminem raps over a pungi loop.

After "Hello", where Eminem re-introduces himself after years of being absent mentally, he continues his violent fantasies on "Same Song & Dance", where he abducts and murders Lindsay Lohan and Britney Spears. The upbeat rhythm of "Same Song & Dance" reminded Eminem of a dance track, which inspired him to write something in order to "get women to dance to it and not really know what the fuck they're dancing to" without listening to the lyrics. On the ninth track of the album, "We Made You", Eminem mocks several celebrities and plays the role of a "pop star serial killer". Eminem noted that his various "celebrity bashings" were not meant to be seen as personal attacks, but it was rather "picking names out of a hat" that rhymed with the words he wanted to use during the writing process. On "Medicine Ball", Eminem mocks and impersonates deceased actor Christopher Reeve in order to get his audience to "laugh at it, and then almost feel bad for laughing". The next track, "Stay Wide Awake", shows Eminem rapping about assaulting and raping women. Dr. Dre also has a guest appearance on "Old Time's Sake", a duet Eminem described as a "fun, yet reminiscent record old times" in which he and Dre rap back and forth between each other, advocating the use of marijuana for creative and financial benefits. "Must Be the Ganja" follows, where Eminem raps that working in the recording studio is like a drug and an addiction for him.

After the skit "Mr. Mathers", where Eminem is found unconscious in bathroom by paramedics due to a drug overdose and taken to a hospital, "Déjà Vu" addresses his overdose in 2007 and drug dependency during his hiatus from music. On the song, Eminem also explains how this has affected him in the last five years, to the point where his daughter has become scared of her father's behavior. "Beautiful", a ballad which samples "Reaching Out" by Queen + Paul Rodgers, also deals with the same time period where Eminem believed he had "reached rock bottom" and lost hope for his future. Eminem felt it was important to include "Beautiful" on the album as a reminder to himself as well as "anybody who is in a dark place [...] that you can get out of it". Following "Crack a Bottle", a collaboration with Dr. Dre and 50 Cent, Relapse continues the skits with "Steve Berman (Skit)". The skit contains Steve Berman yelling at Eminem after previously shooting him, and Berman makes him leave by pulling out a gun himself. Relapse concludes with "Underground". On this final track, Eminem sought to bring back his music and lyrics to the subject matter and punchlines reminiscent of "the Hip-Hop Shop times" (The Hip-Hop Shop was a clothing store in Detroit where local rappers, including Eminem, would compete in freestyle battles), before he had become famous and thus did not have worry about the explicit content of his lyrics.

== Release and promotion ==
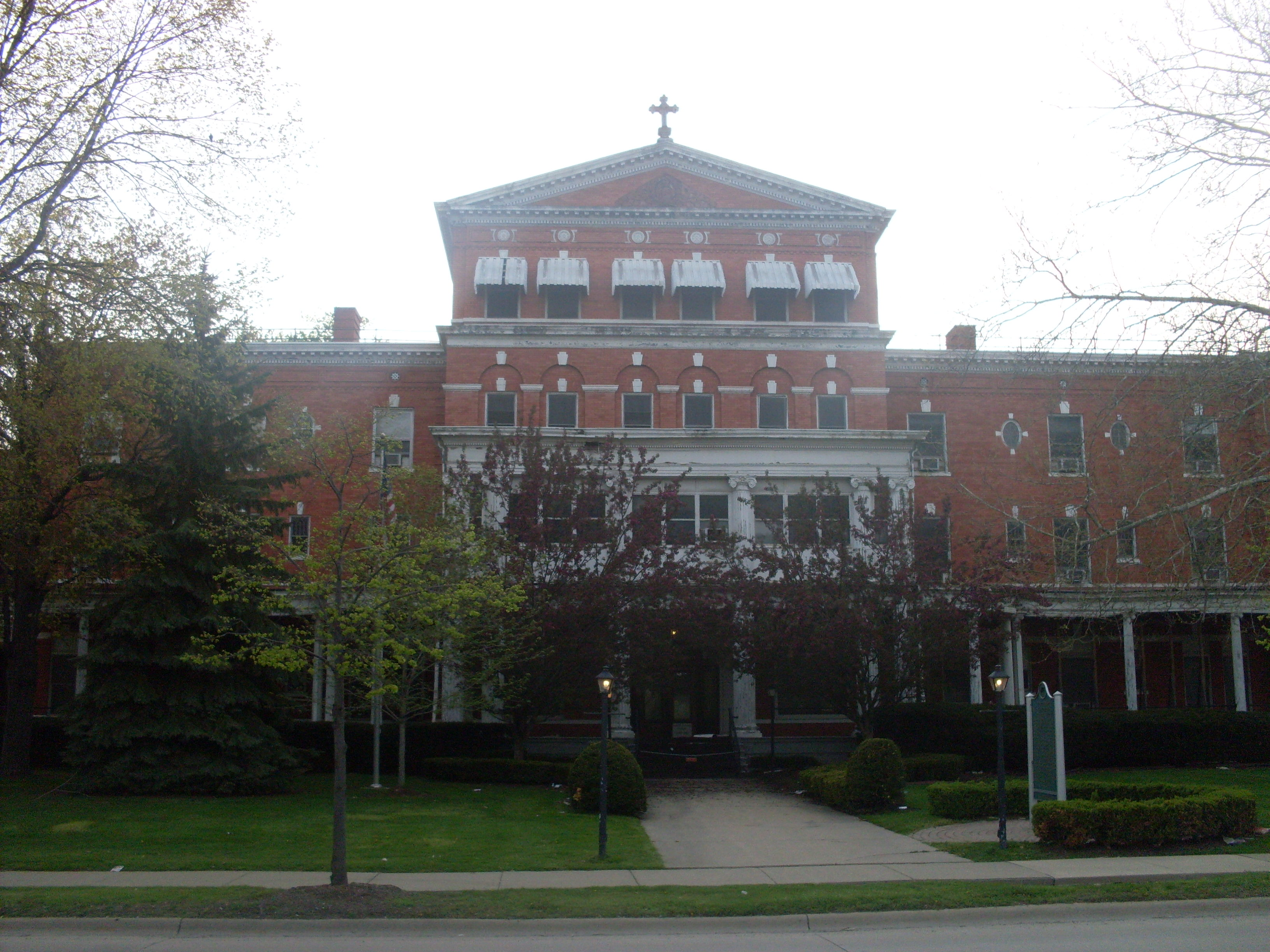
"Popsomp Hills", a fictional rehabilitation center established to promote Relapse

In 2007, Shady Records rapper Cashis discussed the album, referring to it by the title King Mathers and adding that it would be released later that year. However, Eminem's publicist Dennis Dennehy would later deny this and stated that "there was no album scheduled for a 2007 release" and that, as of August 2007, there was no confirmed title. No other official statement was made for over a year. It was not until September 15, 2008, at an event held by Shade 45 to celebrate the publication of Eminem's autobiography The Way I Am, the rapper confirmed his plans to release a studio album by the title of Relapse. During the party, he also previewed to the audience a song called "I'm Having a Relapse".

In regards to the album's release date, Rolling Stone wrote in its October 2008 issue that Virgin Megastores had planned to distribute Relapse on November 27, 2008, in the United States. On October 27, a spokesperson for Interscope explained that there was no official date at the time, and that any release dates that had been posted on any website were unfounded. In a phone conversation during the finale of Total Request Live on November 16, 2008, Eminem asserted that Relapse would be released during the first quarter of 2009, precisely during either of the first two months of the year, explaining that he was in the process of selecting the songs for the album.

Despite the leak two months before, "Crack a Bottle" was eventually released for legal paid digital download as a single on February 2, 2009, and also reached the number one position on the US Billboard Hot 100; according to Eminem's manager Paul Rosenberg, a music video for the song had been produced and directed by Syndrome and was released in several parts of the world from May to early June. At the time of the release, various contradicting reports disputed whether the song would be included on Relapse, but a press release from head label Universal Music Group confirmed the single's inclusion on the album. In similar press statements after March 5, Universal made public the regional release dates for Relapse: as early as May 15, 2009, in Italy and the Netherlands; most other European countries and Brazil on May 18; and the following day in the United States and Australia. Additionally, the record label also announced a second album by Eminem, then called Relapse 2 but later titled Recovery, which was to be released by the end of the year, but expected in June 2010. Eminem explained that he and Dr. Dre had recorded a considerable amount of music and thus, by releasing two albums, would allow listeners to have access to all of his music.

After the release of "Crack a Bottle", the music video of the single "We Made You" was aired on April 7, and became available for purchase a week later on April 13. The video was directed by Joseph Kahn and premiered simultaneously on several MTV channels as well as MTV's website. On April 28, the third overall single for the album, "3 a.m.", was released again for paid music download. A music video for "3 a.m." was directed by Syndrome and filmed in Detroit. It premiered on May 2 on Cinemax, several days after a trailer for the video was posted online. Two more singles were distributed prior to the album's release, as "Old Time's Sake" and "Beautiful" went on sale on the iTunes Store on May 5 and 12 respectively. "My Darling" and "Careful What You Wish For" were made available upon purchase of the Premium version of the album. The track "Insane" peaked at position 85 on the US Billboard Hot 100 chart on the album's release via iTunes.

On April 4, 2009, CBS featured Eminem during the network's coverage of the 2009 NCAA Final Four in a segment where he recited the spoken word "Love Letter to Detroit". Later on the same day, the rapper inducted the hip-hop group Run-D.M.C. to the Rock and Roll Hall of Fame. Adam Graham of The Detroit News described this as "all part of the calculated promotional push" for Relapse. The rapper performed live at the 2009 MTV Movie Awards on May 31, while he appeared on the covers of hip-hop magazines Vibe and XXL in their respective issues in June 2009; the latter was created by a deal struck with Eminem and Marvel Comics, where the rapper would pose as Marvel's main vigilante, the Punisher. Marvel created an issue of the comic co-starring Eminem. An iPhone game to accompany the album was released on May 19, 2009.

While on the Never Say Never tour, fellow group members Swifty and Kuniva (D12) along with Royce Da 5'9" stopped by KISS 100FM for a live interview and spoke on Relapse. Royce stated that the album will be a game changer and jokingly said he might have to push his own album back three years after Eminem drops his. Kuniva added that D12 recorded many tracks for Relapse but wasn't sure if they would make the album or not. Swifty then confirmed that Eminem would be dropping two albums in 2009, with Relapse 2 following Relapse. Relapse was re-released on December 21, 2009, as Relapse: Refill, with seven bonus tracks and including the single "Forever" (originally on More Than a Game soundtrack), "Taking My Ball" (released with DJ Hero), and five previously unreleased tracks. On its re-release, Eminem stated: "I want to deliver more material for the fans this year like I originally planned. Hopefully these tracks on The Refill will tide the fans over until we put out Relapse 2 next year".

=== Artwork ===
The album cover for Relapse was first published through Eminem's Twitter account on April 21, 2009. It illustrates a head shot of the rapper composed by a mosaic of thousands of pills. A sticker on the cover resembles a prescription drug label, on which the patient is Eminem and the prescribing doctor is Dr. Dre. Gil Kaufman of MTV News described the cover as a reference to the rapper's struggle and addiction to prescription drugs, adding that it follows Eminem's habit of displaying personal issues in his art. The album booklet and back cover follow a pill prescription design. On the backside of the booklet is a dedication to Proof, where Eminem explains that he's sober and that he tried to write a song for him, but that he didn't find one of them good enough therefore he dedicates the whole album to him. The CD itself is meant to represent the lid on a bottle of prescription pills, grey with the big red inscription "Push Down & Turn". The cover for Relapse: Refill is the same, with the background color changed from black to white. The prescription drug label is scratched out and the writing "Refill" is posed next to it.

=== Reissue ===
Because Eminem recorded far more material than he could use for one album and felt that he had to offer his fans more music after staying on hiatus for so long, fellow D12 member Swift confirmed that Eminem in fact had planned to put out two albums the same year, following with Relapse 2, in late 2009. According to Angela Yee's Shade 45 interview with Eminem on April 23, 2009, Relapse 2 was to be a continuation of Relapse. During the interview, Eminem confirmed: "It's extremely close to being finished, it just depends on how many songs I want to put on it." Eminem also explained the album was more "emotionally driven" than Relapse, which was, as he explains, "[just] rap records". Guest appearances were expected to come from the likes of Dr. Dre, 50 Cent, D12, Royce da 5'9", Lloyd Banks and Cashis. The album was subsequently pushed back for an early 2010 release, so Eminem decided to re-release Relapse as Relapse: Refill, which includes a bonus disc featuring seven new tracks, including the single "Forever" (originally on More Than a Game soundtrack) and "Taking My Ball" (released with DJ Hero), as well as five previously unreleased tracks. On its re-release, Eminem stated: "I want to deliver more material for the fans this year like I originally planned. Hopefully these tracks on The Refill will tide the fans over until we put out Relapse 2 next year."

On April 13, 2010, Eminem tweeted "There is no Relapse 2", thus announcing that the album has been scrapped in favor of his new project Recovery. While recording Relapse 2 and witnessing the mixed reaction of its predecessor among fans and critics alike, Eminem decided to throw away most of the recorded material and started from scratch. The result did not seem to him as continuation of Relapse but more of an individual project that deserved its own name. Eminem said: "I had originally planned for Relapse 2 to come out last year. But as I kept recording and working with new producers, the idea of a sequel to Relapse started to make less and less sense to me, and I wanted to make a completely new album. The music on Recovery came out very different from Relapse, and I think it deserves its own title." The now-renamed album debuted at number 1 on the US Billboard 200 chart, with first-week sales of 741,000 copies in the United States. As of September 25, 2011, the album had sold 4,040,000 copies in the United States and was also the best-selling album of 2010 worldwide, earning a Grammy Award for Best Rap Album.

== Critical reception ==
Professional ratings
Aggregate scores
Source	Rating
AnyDecentMusic?	5.7/10
Metacritic	59/100
Review scores
Source	Rating
AllMusic	4/5 stars
The A.V. Club	C−
Entertainment Weekly	A−
The Guardian	3/5 stars
The Independent	2/5 stars
MSN Music (Consumer Guide)	B−
NME	5/10
Pitchfork	4.8/10
Rolling Stone	4/5 stars
Spin	4/10

According to the review aggregator Metacritic, Relapse received "mixed or average reviews" based on a weighted average score of 59 out of 100 from 27 critic scores.

Andy Gill of The Independent found the album to be "drably repetitive, while its dated tone is emphasised by the return of Dr. Dre as producer." NME's Louis Pattison found Eminem's wordplay "wicked in the depths of its depravity", but felt that "the overriding feel is of an album just too jaded, too joyless to truly count as a return to form". Slant Magazine's Eric Henderson viewed that "the further Relapse strays from narrative veracity, the more one suspects his fanbase feels he's tapping into his bottomless well for horror-show grandstanding." The Times called Relapse "an album that sits square between what Eminem is theoretically still capable of and what we feared he has become." Nathan Rabin, writing in The A.V. Club, panned it as "facile pre-adolescent shock mixed with gory, corpse-strewn, Fangoria-damaged horrorcore." MSN Music's Robert Christgau called it a "dud" and accused Eminem of sensationalism: "this is not a Slim Shady album. Slim Shady had a lightness about him".

In a positive review, Rolling Stone magazine's Rob Sheffield called the album a "more painful, honest and vital record" that is on-par or better than Eminem's 2002 album The Eminem Show. Stephen Thomas Erlewine of AllMusic described the album as "musically white-hot, dense, and dramatic" and said that "his flow is so good, his wordplay so sharp, it seems churlish to wish that he addressed something other than his long-standing obsessions and demons". The Daily Telegraph commended its honest depiction of Eminem's drug addiction and overuse. Although he found its concept "spotty", Vibe's Benjamin Meadows-Ingram praised Eminem's lyricism, writing that "Em works wonders with words, expanding the boundaries of the art of rap itself [...] the composition is experimental and abstract, a master toying with form". Despite calling it an "impressively focused and clever work", Los Angeles Times writer Ann Powers felt the music was "not transcendent" and commented that "Eminem could have pulled his music into a new category. What he presents is still powerful, but narrowly cast". At the 52nd Grammy Awards, the album won a Grammy Award for Best Rap Album.

=== Retrospective appraisals ===
"Relapse is a masterpiece. I was blessed to be there during this wave of creative brilliance that for me is tell-tale-heart of hip-hop." - Mark Batson

Despite the lukewarm reviews at its release, Relapse gained a strong cult following and it is considered by many as one of Eminem's classic albums. Mark Batson, one of the co-producers with Dr. Dre, said: "When we made Relapse with Eminem, it was not well received at the moment but now it is considered to be a classic. That's how it goes." Eminem's long-time manager Paul Rosenberg singled out "Underground" as one of his favorite songs.

Mitch Findlay from HotNewHipHop touted Relapse as Eminem's strongest project after The Eminem Show: "Relapse is probably the strongest of Eminem's post-comeback catalog, largely in part to some excellent production from Dr. Dre, Dawaun Parker, and Mike Elizondo. Plus, Em seems to be in the zone here, especially when it comes to his flow. The concept, in which he embodies a depraved, accented serial killer, can be a little tiresome, but it also leads to a gratuitous bout of lyrical and hilarious Grand-Guignol." He singled out "Hello", "Beautiful" and "Deja Vu" as highlights. In 2019, Findlay included "Same Song & Dance" and "Music Box" on his "Dr. Dre's Top 10 Most Haunting Beats". Complex magazine's "The 100 Best Eminem Songs" ranks "Stay Wide Awake" at number 86, "Elevator" at number 81, "My Darling" at number 79, "Underground" at number 74, "3 a.m." at number 67, "Insane" at number 27, and "Déjà Vu" at number 20.

Drew Landry from DJBooth called Relapse a "dark, disturbing and often hilarious album" and said: "Relapse sounds like a "how many violent dick jokes can I shout before someone tries to decapitate me" science experiment. If you simply sit back and embrace the depravity, though, it's oddly glorious. Eminem wasn't trying to make radio hits nor was he trying to inspire fans; he just wanted to gross us all out. And in that regard, holy shit does he succeed." He singled out "Insane", "Stay Wide Awake", "Same Song & Dance", "Medicine Ball" and "3 a.m." as the five most disgusting songs on the album and referred to the album as "an episode of South Park written by Stephen King".

Patrick Bierut from UDiscoverMusic named Relapse "the true marvel of Eminem's sinister return to hip-hop" and said "Relapse remains one of the most overlooked releases not only of Eminem's career, but the mid-to-late 00s. Not only is it the Eminem album in which Dr. Dre had the truest hand in production, it's also the most remarkable demonstration of his raw ability to rap better than almost anyone else. Due to its divisive content, however, Relapse doesn't get enough credit for being the marvel it truly is."

Spin also included some songs of the album on the top 100 of All 289 Eminem Songs, Ranked article, included "Déjà Vu" at 36 position, "Crack a Bottle" at number 48, "Beautiful" at number 62, "3 a.m." at number 68, "Elevator" at number 76, "Stay Wide Awake" at number 79 and "Underground" at number 82. HipHopDX called Relapse a "horrorcore masterpiece" and said: "the record stands as an artistic achievement that further solidifies Eminem as one of the greatest, most creative MCs to ever pick up a microphone. The article goes on to reflect the changing fan sentiment toward the album, stating that it took "years to uncover its brilliance".

In July 2024, Damien Scott from Billboard magazine ranked Relapse as Eminem's eighth best album and described it as "the most fantastical album he's made since The Slim Shady LP: There is a song where he plays a serial killer, a song where he fantasizes about abducting pop stars, a song where he threatens Mariah Carey's then-husband Nick Cannon, and an incredible song where he goes into great detail about the depths of his drug addiction. It's a dark album that, unlike The Slim Shady LP, sounds and feels as dark as its content."

=== Eminem's thoughts on the album ===
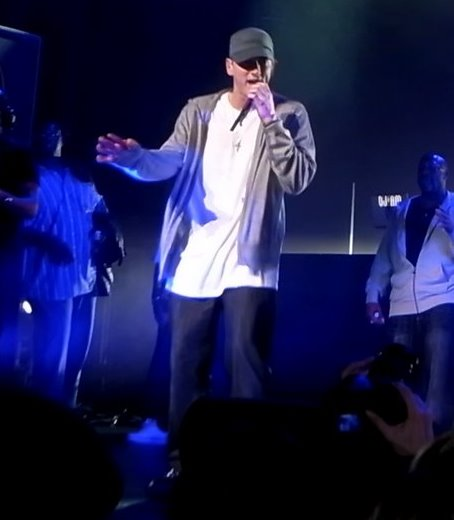
Eminem performing in support of Relapse in 2009

Given its status as one of Eminem's more polarizing albums, the rapper has offered his own reflections on the record over a number of years since its release. For a significant period of time following Relapse, Eminem's opinion appeared to be a distinctly negative one. On his following album Recovery (2010), he criticised Relapse in the second verse of the song "Not Afraid": "In fact, let's be honest/That last Relapse CD was 'ehh'/ Perhaps I ran them accents into the ground/ Relax, I ain't going back to that now". Furthermore, in the song "Talkin' 2 Myself", Eminem states that he was deep in the process of getting clean from his drug addiction when he produced the album, claiming this heavily contributed to its subpar status.

While denying his apparent dislike for the album in 2011, Eminem did not rank the project among his best work: "I don't hate Relapse. I don't hate it at all, but when I'm looking back.. especially with that album, (I have a tendency) to run things into the ground. That was one of those instances where I got in a zone, like, 'Yo I just want to be this demented serial killer on this album.' And part of that was a growing process to get to Recovery, working through those steps, relearning how to rap, and relearning where I need to be at." He reiterated this sentiment during a 2013 Q&A with Rolling Stone: "I don't hate the record. I want to rap and be able to always try to do my best lyrically, but at the same time find the right balance between that and making the right songs. And you know, I don't know if I necessarily found that balance yet, because I was just getting sober and just kind of finding my feet again... I don't know if that record was particularly my best work as far as... writing songs that felt like something, that brought some kind of emotions... I got stuck on that kind of serial killer, crazy vibe and just kind of went with it."

The use of different accents on the record was controversial upon release. In a 2017 interview, preceding the release of his album Revival, Eminem addressed this directly: "I recorded at least 50 to 60 songs for that album and on each one I would get a little more drastic with the accents, trying to bend the words and make them rhyme in ways they wouldn't if you just said them regular. It was this gradual thing and I didn't even realize how accent-heavy the album got." Eminem stated that the use of accents was highlighted by his record label and that he felt it impacted on the albums overall quality. "Paul [Rosenberg] (Eminem's manager) didn't realize either until he went and played the music for somebody at Interscope and they were like, "Why is he doing all those accents?" So yeah, I don't know how much replay value that album has."

Following the lacklustre reception towards Revival, Eminem dropped a surprise response album – Kamikaze (2018) – the following year. Shortly following its release, he participated in a four-part interview with Sway Calloway, where he once again highlighted his dissatisfaction with Relapse, going as far as to rank it towards the bottom of his own discography: "I have made albums that definitely... would not be at the top of my list — Encore, Relapse...I believe Encore is a better album than Relapse. Relapse is something I went back to and cringed at. Like, 'Jesus Christ, I didn't realize I was doing that many accents.'"

However, in 2020, Eminem's opinion towards Relapse started to become more positive. Before the YouTube premiere of the "Godzilla" music video on the Lyrical Lemonade channel, Eminem answered fan questions on the live chat. Fans filled the chat with requests for Relapse 2, which Eminem addressed, "I see a lot of requests for accents!" He would also post on social media celebrating the 11th anniversary of the album's release. Later that year, Eminem released Music to Be Murdered By – Side B (Deluxe Edition), which included the song "Discombobulated". On the track, he rapped in his Relapse rap style, which many fans interpreted as him both embracing and paying tribute to the album for the first time.

In a 2024 skit conducted for Complex as part of The Death of Slim Shady (Coup de Grâce) album release cycle, Eminem and his alter ego Slim Shady interview each other. Slim Shady mocks Eminem for his rap style on Relapse, mirroring many of the critiques Eminem himself has levelled at the album over the years: "Are you fucking kidding me? No one told your retarded ass to go record an entire album in accents." However, on this occasion, Eminem responds defending Relapse, acknowledging its critical reappraisal and the cult status that it has gained among his fanbase: "For what it's worth, there's an entire generation of people who think that (album) is a fucking classic."

== Commercial performance ==
One of the most anticipated albums of 2009, Relapse was the top-selling hip-hop album of the year. Upon its release, the album debuted at No. 1 on the US Billboard 200 chart, selling 608,000 copies in its first week. In Canada, the album sold 64,000 copies in its first week and debuted at number 1 on the Canadian Albums Chart. By the end of 2009, the album had sold 180,000 physical units in Canada, making it the ninth best-selling physical album in Canada of 2009. Outside of North America, Relapse managed to reach the number one spot in its first week in various other countries including Australia, France, Norway, Denmark and New Zealand, while climbing into the Top 5 in many other countries, including Germany, Italy, Finland, Spain, Belgium, the Netherlands, Austria, Switzerland and Sweden. In its second week the album stayed at number one and sold a further 211,000 copies, taking its total to 819,000 to become the fifth best-seller of the year. In the third week, Relapse dropped to number two and sold another 141,000 copies, bringing the total U.S. sales to 962,000, Relapse dropped to number three in its fourth week, selling 87,000 copies for a total of 1,049,000 in the U.S. The next week, Relapse went down to number four and sold 72,000 copies. In its sixth week, the album was at number five and sold another 47,000 copies, pushing its total sales to 1,169,000. It dropped down to the number nine in its seventh week, selling 39,000 copies and taking its total U.S. sales up to 1,207,000 copies. In its eighth week, it remained at number nine and sold a further 34,000 copies for a total of 1,241,000.

Relapse became the best selling rap album of 2009. As of March 2014, Relapse has sold 2.3 million copies in the United States. The album was certified double platinum by the Recording Industry Association of America on August 27, 2010.

== Track listing ==
Standard edition
No.	Title	Writer(s)	Producer(s)	Length
1.	"Dr. West (Skit)" (performed by Dominic West & Marshall Mathers)	Marshall Mathers; Paul Rosenberg	Dr. Dre; Eminem	1:29
2.	"3 a.m."	Mathers; Andre Young; Mark Batson; Dawaun Parker; Trevor Lawrence; Mike Elizondo	Dr. Dre	5:19
3.	"My Mom"	Mathers; Young; Batson; Parker; Lawrence	Dr. Dre	5:19
4.	"Insane"	Mathers; Young; Batson; Parker; Lawrence; Elizondo	Dr. Dre	3:01
5.	"Bagpipes from Baghdad"	Mathers; Young; Batson; Parker; Lawrence; Elizondo; Sean Cruse	Dr. Dre; Trevor Lawrence, Jr.	4:43
6.	"Hello"	Mathers; Young; Batson; Parker; Lawrence	Dr. Dre; Mark Batson	4:08
7.	"Tonya (Skit)" (performed by Elizabeth Keener)	Mathers; Rosenberg	Dr. Dre; Eminem	0:42
8.	"Same Song & Dance"	Mathers; Young; Batson; Parker; Lawrence; Elizondo	Dr. Dre; Dawaun Parker	4:06
9.	"We Made You"	Mathers; Young; Batson; Parker; Lawrence; Walter Egan	Dr. Dre; Eminem; Doc Ish^{[a]}	4:29
10.	"Medicine Ball"	Mathers; Young; Batson; Parker; Lawrence	Dr. Dre; Mark Batson	3:57
11.	"Paul (Skit)" (performed by Paul Rosenberg)	Mathers; Rosenberg	Eminem; Bass; Luis Resto^{[a]}	0:19
12.	"Stay Wide Awake"	Mathers; Young; Batson; Parker; Lawrence; Elizondo	Dr. Dre	5:19
13.	"Old Time's Sake" (featuring Dr. Dre)	Mathers; Young; Batson; Parker; Lawrence	Dr. Dre; Mark Batson	4:38
14.	"Must Be the Ganja"	Mathers; Young; Batson; Parker; Lawrence	Dr. Dre; Mark Batson	4:02
15.	"Mr. Mathers (Skit)"	Mathers; Rosenberg	Dr. Dre; Eminem	0:42
16.	"Déjà Vu"	Mathers; Young; Batson; Parker; Lawrence; Cruse	Dr. Dre	4:43
17.	"Beautiful"	Mathers; Luis Resto; Jeffrey Bass; Don Black; Andy Hill	Eminem; Jeff Bass	6:32
18.	"Crack a Bottle" (with Dr. Dre & 50 Cent)	Mathers; Young; Curtis Jackson; Batson; Parker; Lawrence; Jean Renard	Dr. Dre	4:57
19.	"Steve Berman (Skit)" (performed by Angela Yee, Marshall Mathers & Steve Berman)	Mathers; Rosenberg	Eminem; Resto^{[a]}	1:29
20.	"Underground"	Mathers; Young; Batson; Parker; Lawrence	Dr. Dre; Curtis "Sauce" Wilson (chorus vocals)	6:11
Total length:				76:05

Deluxe edition
No.	Title	Writer(s)	Producer(s)	Length
21.	"My Darling"	Marshall Mathers; Andre Young; Luis Resto; Mike Strange	Eminem	5:20
22.	"Careful What You Wish For"	Mathers; Resto; Steve King	Eminem	3:47
Total length:				85:12

Refill edition disc two
No.	Title	Writer(s)	Producer(s)	Length
1.	"Forever" (with Drake, Kanye West and Lil Wayne)	Mathers; Aubrey Graham; Kanye West; Dwayne Carter; Matthew Samuels	Boi-1da	5:58
2.	"Hell Breaks Loose" (featuring Dr. Dre)	Mathers; Andre Young; Mark Batson; Dawaun Parker; Trevor Lawrence, Jr.	Dr. Dre; Mark Batson	4:04
3.	"Buffalo Bill"	Mathers; Young; Batson; Parker; Lawrence; Mike Elizondo	Dr. Dre; Batson	3:52
4.	"Elevator"	Mathers; Luis Resto	Eminem; Luis Resto^{[a]}	4:52
5.	"Taking My Ball"	Mathers; Young; Batson; Parker; Lawrence	Dr. Dre	5:01
6.	"Music Box"	Mathers; Young; Batson; Parker; Lawrence	Dr. Dre; Dawaun Parker	5:05
7.	"Drop the Bomb on 'Em"	Mathers; Young; Batson; Parker; Lawrence	Dr. Dre	4:48
Total length:				33:40

Notes

- ^{^[a]} signifies an additional producer.
- On the clean version, "Must Be The Ganja" is written as "Must Be The".
- iTunes deluxe edition includes the single versions of "We Made You" and "Crack a Bottle" and the music videos of "3 a.m." and "We Made You".

== Personnel ==
Musicians

- Eminem – vocals (tracks 2–6, 8–10, 12–14, 16–18 and 20)
- Mark Batson – keyboards (tracks 1–10, 12–16, 18 and 20)
- Dawaun Parker – keyboards (tracks 1–8, 10, 12–16, 18 and 20)
- Trevor Lawrence Jr. – keyboards (tracks 1–6, 8 and 12–14)
- Mike Elizondo – guitar (tracks 2, 4, 8 and 12), keyboards (tracks 2 and 4–5), bass (track 2)
- Eric "Jesus" Coomes – guitar (tracks 3, 14 and 18), bass (tracks 13, 14 and 18)
- Sean Cruse – guitar (tracks 5 and 16)
- Charmagne Tripp – chorus vocals (track 9)
- Traci Nelson – backing vocals (track 14)
- Jeff Bass – keyboards, bass and guitar (track 17)
- Luis Resto – keyboards (track 17)

Production

- Dr. Dre – production (all tracks except 17), audio mixing (tracks 1–10, 12–16, 18–20), executive production
- Eminem – production (tracks 1, 7, 9, 15, 17)
- Jeff Bass – production (track 17)
- Mike Strange – recording engineer (tracks 1–6, 8–10, 12–20), audio mixing (track 17)
- Mauricio "Veto" Iragorri – recording engineer (tracks 1–10, 12–16, 18–20)
- Paul Foley – recording engineer (tracks 15 and 20)
- Ruben Rivera – recording engineer (track 20)
- Robert Reyes – assistant recording engineer (tracks 1–10, 12–16, 18–20)
- Joe Strange – assistant recording engineer (tracks 1–10, 12, 15–20)
- Tommy Hicks Jr. – assistant recording engineer (tracks 3–4, 13–14, 18)
- Conor Gilligan – assistant recording engineer (track 6)
- Lizette Rangel – assistant recording engineer (track 20)
- Brian Gardner – mastering

== Charts ==
=== Weekly charts ===
Weekly chart performance for Relapse
Chart (2009–2010)	Peak position
Australian Albums (ARIA)	1
Austrian Albums (Ö3 Austria)	2
Belgian Albums (Ultratop Flanders)	1
Belgian Albums (Ultratop Wallonia)	4
Canadian Albums (Billboard)	1
Danish Albums (Hitlisten)	1
Dutch Albums (Album Top 100)	3
European Top 100 Albums (Billboard)	2
Finnish Albums (Suomen virallinen lista)	5
French Albums (SNEP)	1
German Albums (Offizielle Top 100)	2
Greek Albums (IFPI)	13
Hungarian Albums (MAHASZ)	14
Icelandic Albums (Tónlistinn)	3
Irish Albums (IRMA)	1
Italian Albums (FIMI)	4
Japanese Albums (Oricon)	1
Mexican Albums (Top 100 Mexico)	24
New Zealand Albums (RMNZ)	1
Norwegian Albums (VG-lista)	1
Polish Albums (ZPAV)	1
Scottish Albums (Official Charts)	1
South Korean Albums (Circle) Relapse: Refill	60
South Korean International Albums (Circle) Relapse: Refill	21
South African Albums (RISA)	10
Spanish Albums (Promusicae)	5
Swedish Albums (Sverigetopplistan)	3
Swiss Albums (Schweizer Hitparade)	2
Taiwan International Albums (G-Music)	1
UK Albums (Official Charts)	1
UK R&B Albums (Official Charts)	1
US Billboard 200	1
US Top Rap Albums (Billboard)	1
US Top R&B/Hip-Hop Albums (Billboard)	1

=== Year-end charts ===
2009 year-end chart performance for Relapse
Chart (2009)	Position
Australian Albums (ARIA)	17
Australian Urban Albums (ARIA)	4
Austrian Albums (Ö3 Austria)	50
Belgian Albums (Ultratop Flanders)	43
Belgian Alternative Albums (Ultratop Flanders)	22
Canadian Albums (Billboard)	9
Danish Albums (Hitlisten)	63
Dutch Albums (MegaCharts)	72
European Top 100 Albums (Billboard)	38
French Albums (SNEP)	73
German Albums (Offizielle Top 100)	61
Japanese Albums (Oricon)	70
New Zealand Albums (RMNZ)	17
Polish Albums (ZPAV)	96
Swedish Albums (Sverigetopplistan) (Relapse Refill)	79
Swiss Albums (Schweizer Hitparade)	27
UK Albums (OCC)	30
US Billboard 200	9
US Top Rap Albums (Billboard)	2
US Top R&B/Hip-Hop Albums (Billboard)	7

2010 year-end chart performance for Relapse
Chart (2010)	Position
Australian Urban Albums (ARIA)	25
US Billboard 200	43
US Top Rap Albums (Billboard)	4
US Top R&B/Hip-Hop Albums (Billboard)	11

== Certifications and sales ==
Region	Certification	Certified units/sales
Australia (ARIA)	2× Platinum	140,000^{‡}
Austria (IFPI Austria)	Gold	10,000^{*}
Belgium (BRMA)	Gold	15,000^{*}
Denmark (IFPI Danmark)	Gold	10,000^{‡}
France (SNEP)	Gold	50,000^{*}
GCC (IFPI Middle East)	Gold	3,000^{*}
Germany (BVMI)	Gold	100,000^{^}
Ireland (IRMA)	2× Platinum	30,000^{^}
Italy (FIMI)	Gold	30,000^{*}
Japan (RIAJ)	Gold	100,000^{^}
New Zealand (RMNZ) Relapse: The Refill	4× Platinum	60,000^{‡}
Russia (NFPF)	Gold	10,000^{*}
South Africa (RISA)	Gold	20,000^{*}
Switzerland (IFPI Switzerland)	Platinum	30,000^{^}
United Kingdom (BPI)	2× Platinum	588,000
United States (RIAA)	3× Platinum	3,000,000^{‡}
^{*} Sales figures based on certification alone.^{^} Shipments figures based on certification alone.^{‡} Sales+streaming figures based on certification alone.

== Release history ==
Region	Date	Distributing label	Format	Catalog
Australia	May 15, 2009	Universal Music	CD	2703216
Germany	May 15, 2009	Universal Music	CD	0602527032160
Italy	May 15, 2009	Universal Music	CD	
Netherlands	May 15, 2009	Universal Music	CD	0602527032160
Denmark	May 18, 2009	Universal Music	CD	
France	May 18, 2009	Polydor, Universal Music	CD	
New Zealand	May 18, 2009	Universal Music	CD	2703216
Poland	May 18, 2009	Universal Music	CD	2708880
Portugal	May 18, 2009	Universal Music	CD	
Russia	May 18, 2009	Universal Music	CD	
Sweden	May 18, 2009	Universal Music	CD	
United Kingdom	May 18, 2009	Polydor	CD	2703216
Brazil	May 19, 2009	Universal Music	CD	602527032160
Canada	May 19, 2009	Universal Music	CD	B001286302
India	May 19, 2009	Universal Music	CD	0602527032160
Spain	May 19, 2009	Universal Music	CD	
United States	May 19, 2009	Interscope	CD	001286302
United States	May 19, 2009	Interscope	CD [Clean]	001286402
United States	May 19, 2009	Interscope	LP	001286301
Japan	May 20, 2009	Universal Music	CD	UICS-1190
Japan	May 20, 2009	Universal Music	CD + DVD	UICS-9106
Argentina	May 28, 2009	Universal Music	CD	

== See also ==
- List of UK Albums Chart number ones of the 2000s
- List of number-one albums of 2009 (Australia)
- List of number-one albums of 2009 (Canada)
- List of number-one albums of 2009 (Ireland)
- List of number-one albums of 2009 (Japan)
- List of number-one albums of 2009 (New Zealand)
- List of number-one albums of 2009 (U.S.)
- List of UK R&B Chart number-one albums of 2009
