= We Made You =

2009 single by Eminem

Single by Eminem

from the album Relapse
- B-side: "We Made You (Instrumental)"
- Released: April 7, 2009
- Recorded: November 2008
- Genre: Comedy hip hop
- Length: 4:29
- Label: Aftermath; Shady; Interscope
- Songwriters: Marshall Mathers; Andre Young; Mark Batson; Dawaun Parker; Trevor Lawrence, Jr.; Walter Egan
- Producers: Dr. Dre; Eminem

Eminem singles chronology
"Crack a Bottle" (2009)	"We Made You" (2009)	"3 a.m." (2009)

Music video
- "We Made You" (Kids friendly) on YouTube "We Made You" (Smurf version) on YouTube

"We Made You" is a song by American rapper Eminem from his sixth studio album Relapse (2009). It was released as the second single from the album on April 7, 2009. "We Made You" was written by Eminem, Dr. Dre, Dawaun Parker, Mark Batson, Trevor Lawrence Jr. and Walter Egan. Production was handled by Dr. Dre, with Eminem and Doc Ish serving as additional co-producers.

"We Made You" received generally positive reviews from music critics, and became a success, peaking inside the Top 10 in fourteen countries and at number nine on the Billboard Hot 100. Just like "Shake That", this single is known for being a departure from the serious tone of his second released singles from his previous albums such as "Cleanin' Out My Closet", "The Way I Am" and "Like Toy Soldiers", instead having a more comedic tone.

== Background ==
Doc Ish originally offered the "We Made You" instrumental (along with the same chorus as the final version) to Red Café, before eventually selling it to Bizarre. After Bizarre had written his own lyrics to the instrumental, Eminem heard it and decided he wanted it for himself; when Bizarre called Doc Ish to reveal Eminem's interest, he initially thought Bizarre was joking and hung up the phone on him.

It features chorus vocals by Charmagne Tripp. Produced by Dr. Dre and co-produced by Doc Ish and Eminem himself, the song samples "Hot Summer Nights" by Walter Egan. The official cover for the single is a picture of the music video, with Eminem, Oxen, Lisa Ann and Bobby Lee.

== Critical reception ==
"We Made You" has generally positive reviews from music critics. Daniel Kreps of Rolling Stone magazine gave it a positive review stating, "It's nice to see Eminem goofing around again after a few years out of the spotlight during which he grappled with serious issues like the death of his friend Proof, and 'We Made You' with its damnation of current celebrities will likely prove to be a solid pop cultural time capsule of this weird 2009 moment we're experiencing now." Billboard said, "Atop Dr. Dre's marching beat is primarily piano instrumentation, which amid drums and tubas give the track a carnival feel... And in case his word play was too fast and strange accent too difficult to decipher, Charmagne Tripp sings the chorus." Tim Jonze of The Guardian however, reported, "'We Made You' is not Eminem doing what he does best."

== Chart performance ==
"We Made You" sold 167,000 downloads in its first week to enter the Hot Digital Songs chart in Billboard Magazine at number three. The song also debuted at number nine on the Billboard Hot 100, becoming Eminem's second top-ten in a row on the chart, following "Crack a Bottle", a collaboration with Dr. Dre and 50 Cent. This marks the first time that Eminem has had back-to-back top-ten hits on the Hot 100 as a lead artist since 2002, when he scored with "Without Me", "Cleanin' Out My Closet" and "Lose Yourself". "We Made You" has reached the top ten in twelve countries, including number one in Ireland, New Zealand, and Australia.

== Music video ==
=== Development and release ===
The single's music video was directed by Joseph Kahn, who also shot "Without Me" from The Eminem Show is in the same vein as previous videos under the Slim Shady persona, and the first of its kind since Encore's "Ass Like That". The video was filmed in Las Vegas and features guest star appearances by Dr. Dre, 50 Cent, Denaun Porter, Bobby Lee, The Palms hotel owner George Maloof, Francesca Le (playing Kim Kardashian), Melissa Peterman, Vanilla Ice, Trisha Paytas (playing Jessica Simpson's role in The Dukes of Hazzard), Derrick Barry (playing Britney Spears), actress Gabrielle Salinger (playing Amy Winehouse) and pornographic actress Lisa Ann (playing Sarah Palin). The music video for "We Made You" premiered on April 7, 2009 at 6:00 AM on several MTV networks, as well as MTV.com. The video also premiered on Channel 4 in the United Kingdom on the next day.

There is an R-Rated Director's Cut version of the video that premiered in a live show of Eminem's Concert in 2009.

=== Concept ===
The music video parodies TV shows Rock of Love and Star Trek (with the Starfleet insignia replaced with an inverted 2nd Infantry Division), as well as video game Guitar Hero with Eminem against an imitation version background of the notes while the homage to film Rain Man was shot at The Palms, a film Eminem has previously referenced in his lyrics. Alfred Hitchcock's Psycho is also homaged. On April 3, 2009, Eminem talked about the music video in an MTV News interview, stating that there is some "Celebrity bashing in it", which is often a feature of his album's lead singles. Celebrities mocked include Bret Michaels, Kevin Federline, Britney Spears, Lindsay Lohan, Samantha Ronson, Amy Winehouse and her then-husband Blake Fielder-Civil, Ellen DeGeneres, Portia de Rossi, Jessica Alba, Elvis Presley, Tony Romo, John Mayer, Jennifer Aniston, and Kim Kardashian. Eminem spoofed himself, wearing an ALF T-shirt and holding a cake, referencing a commonly circulated pre-fame photo of him of when he was an adolescent. The video features appearances from Lisa Ann as Sarah Palin, Trisha Paytas as Jessica Simpson, and Derrick Barry, a famous Britney Spears female impersonator, as Spears. The video also features appearances from Dr. Dre and 50 Cent as themselves.

=== Reception ===
The music video won the award at the 2009 MTV Video Music Awards for Best Hip-Hop Video and was nominated for Best Male Video as well as Video of the Year. The video also ranked at #81 on BET's Notarized: Top 100 Videos of 2009 countdown. The music video also features Beats by Dr. Dre Monster headphones.

== Awards and nominations ==
Year	Ceremony	Award	Result
2009	BET Hip Hop Awards	Best Hip Hop Video	Nominated
2009	MTV Europe Music Awards	Best Video	Nominated
2009	MTV Video Music Awards	Video of the Year	Nominated
2009	MTV Video Music Awards	Best Hip-Hop Video	Won
2009	MTV Video Music Awards	Best Male Video	Nominated
2009	MTV Video Music Awards	Best Special Effects	Nominated

== Track listing ==
Digital EP

No.	Title	Writer(s)	Producer(s)	Length
1.	"We Made You"	Marshall Mathers; Andre Young; Mark Batson; Dawaun Parker; Trevor Lawrence, Jr.; Walter Egan	Dr. Dre; Eminem; Doc Ish^{[a]}	4:47
2.	"We Made You" (super clean)	Mathers; Young; Batson; Parker; Lawrence, Jr.; Egan	Dr. Dre; Eminem; Doc Ish^{[a]}	4:47
3.	"We Made You" (instrumental)	Mathers; Young; Batson; Parker; Lawrence, Jr.; Egan	Dr. Dre; Eminem; Doc Ish^{[a]}	4:47
Total length:				15:21

UK CD single

No.	Title	Writer(s)	Producer(s)	Length
1.	"We Made You"	Marshall Mathers; Andre Young; Mark Batson; Dawaun Parker; Trevor Lawrence, Jr.; Walter Egan	Dr. Dre; Eminem; Doc Ish^{[a]}	4:47
2.	"We Made You" (instrumental)	Mathers; Young; Batson; Parker; Lawrence, Jr.; Egan	Dr. Dre; Eminem; Doc Ish^{[a]}	4:47
Total length:				9:34

German CD single

No.	Title	Writer(s)	Producer(s)	Length
1.	"We Made You"	Marshall Mathers; Andre Young; Mark Batson; Dawaun Parker; Trevor Lawrence, Jr.; Walter Egan	Dr. Dre; Eminem; Doc Ish^{[a]}	4:47
2.	"We Made You" (super clean)	Mathers; Young; Batson; Parker; Lawrence, Jr.; Egan	Dr. Dre; Eminem; Doc Ish^{[a]}	4:47
3.	"We Made You" (instrumental)	Mathers; Young; Batson; Parker; Lawrence, Jr.; Egan	Dr. Dre; Eminem; Doc Ish^{[a]}	4:47
4.	"We Made You" (video)	Mathers; Young; Batson; Parker; Lawrence, Jr.; Egan	Dr. Dre; Eminem; Doc Ish^{[a]}	4:47
Total length:				20:08

Notes

- ^{^[a]} signifies an additional producer.

== Personnel ==
- Mark Batson – keyboards
- Charmagne Tripp – chorus vocals

== Charts ==
=== Weekly charts ===
Weekly chart performance for "We Made You"
Chart (2009)	Peak position
Australia (ARIA)	1
Austria (Ö3 Austria Top 40)	6
Belgium (Ultratop 50 Flanders)	13
Belgium (Ultratop 50 Wallonia)	12
Brazil (ABPD)	32
Canada Hot 100 (Billboard)	6
Croatia (HRT)	2
Czech Republic Airplay (ČNS IFPI)	5
Denmark (Tracklisten)	8
European Hot 100 Singles (Billboard)	4
France (SNEP)	11
Germany (GfK)	9
Hungary (Rádiós Top 40)	28
Ireland (IRMA)	1
Italy (FIMI)	33
Israel (Media Forest)	2
Netherlands (Dutch Top 40)	14
Netherlands (Single Top 100)	19
New Zealand (Recorded Music NZ)	1
Norway (VG-lista)	5
Romania (Romanian Top 100)	5
Scottish Singles Sales (Official Charts)	1
Sweden (Sverigetopplistan)	11
Switzerland (Schweizer Hitparade)	4
UK Singles (Official Charts)	4
UK Hip Hop/R&B (Official Charts)	2
US Billboard Hot 100	9
US Hot Rap Songs (Billboard)	19
US Pop Airplay (Billboard)	23
US Rhythmic Airplay (Billboard)	15

=== Year-end charts ===
Year-end chart performance for "We Made You"
Chart (2009)	Position
Australia (ARIA)	26
Australia Hip-Hop/R&B Singles (ARIA)	8
Austria (Ö3 Austria Top 40)	47
Belgium (Ultratop Wallonia)	79
France (SNEP)	83
Hungary (Rádiós Top 40)	127
Japan Adult Contemporary (Billboard)	92
New Zealand (Recorded Music NZ)	27
Sweden (Sverigetopplistan)	94
Switzerland (Schweizer Hitparade)	44
UK Singles (Official Charts)	50

== Certifications ==
Region	Certification	Certified units/sales
Australia (ARIA)	4× Platinum	280,000^{‡}
New Zealand (RMNZ)	Platinum	15,000^{*}
United Kingdom (BPI)	Platinum	600,000^{‡}
United States (RIAA)	2× Platinum	2,000,000^{‡}
^{*} Sales figures based on certification alone.^{‡} Sales+streaming figures based on certification alone.

== Release history ==
Release dates and formats for "We Made You"
Region	Date	Format	Label(s)	Ref.
United States	April 14, 2009	Mainstream airplay	Interscope	

== See also ==
- List of number-one singles in Australia in 2009
- List of number-one singles of 2009 (Ireland)
- List of number-one singles from the 2000s (New Zealand)
- List of Romanian Singles Chart top 10 Singles in 2009
