= Crack a Bottle =

2009 single by Eminem, Dr. Dre and 50 Cent

Single by Eminem, Dr. Dre and 50 Cent

from the album Relapse
- Released: February 2, 2009
- Recorded: September 2008 to January 2009
- Genre: Hip-hop
- Length: 4:57 (album version); 5:15 (single version)
- Label: Aftermath; Shady; Interscope
- Songwriters: Marshall Mathers; Andre Young; Curtis Jackson; Mark Batson; Dawaun Parker; Trevor Lawrence, Jr.; Jean Renard
- Producer: Dr. Dre

Eminem singles chronology
"Jimmy Crack Corn" (2007)	"Crack a Bottle" (2009)	"We Made You" (2009)

Dr. Dre singles chronology
"Set It Off (Remix)" (2008)	"Crack a Bottle" (2009)	"Kush" (2010)

50 Cent singles chronology
"I Get It In" (2009)	"Crack a Bottle" (2009)	"Mujeres in the Club" (2009)

Music video
- "Crack a Bottle" on YouTube

"Crack a Bottle" is a song by American rappers Eminem, Dr. Dre and 50 Cent. The song was released as the lead single from the former's sixth studio album Relapse (2009). On February 12, 2009, the song broke the first week digital sales record with 418,000 downloads, topping the previous record held by "Live Your Life" by T.I. featuring Rihanna. This record was broken again the following week by "Right Round" by Flo Rida. The song won the Grammy Award for Best Rap Performance by a Duo or Group in 2010.

== Background ==
"Crack a Bottle" initially gained attention in December 2008, when an unfinished version of the song was initially leaked under the name "Number One" on the mixtape 4th Quarter Pressure Part 2, while a final working version was leaked on January 6, 2009. Various media outlets had reported that the recording was to be the first single from Eminem's 2009 album Relapse, however the Italian branch of Universal Music Group, owner of Interscope Records, later denied this, stating that "Crack a Bottle" was only a promotional recording. Despite all this, the song was released on February 2, 2009, and made available for paid digital download, with 50 Cent stating that the song will be included on his upcoming album Before I Self Destruct. According to Danielle Harling of HipHopDX—a website dedicated to hip-hop music coverage—the song will ultimately be present on both Relapse and Before I Self Destruct, while in contrast, Daniel Kreps of Rolling Stone Magazine stated that it is still unsure which rapper will feature this song on his upcoming album. Despite the confusion, Universal eventually announced that "Crack a Bottle" would be included in Relapse exclusively; however, the record label did not consider it the album's first single. The song samples "Mais dans la lumière" by Israeli singer Mike Brant, written by Jean Renard, who also received songwriting credits for the song. The same sample is used in the song Preservation by Aesop Rock and Del tha Funkee Homosapien, found on Wu-Tang Clan's 2005 album Wu-Tang Meets the Indie Culture. The song is in the key of C-sharp minor. American rapper Jay Rock released a remix to the song. Rappers Cashis and Bobby Creekwater were featured in the official remix of "Crack a Bottle". Rick Ross also released a remix as a diss to G-Unit.

== Critical reception ==
Billboard gave a positive review of the song: "Although not quite as strong as the title track to Eminem's 2004 album Encore, the return of Eminem, Dr. Dre and 50 Cent has been anticipated for a long time, and it is sure to put Eminem back atop the marquee. His skills remain some of the best in hip-hop, and the accompanying contributions make the music that little bit more stronger." Rolling Stone commented negatively on the song, saying that it is one of the weakest tracks on the album, along the other single "We Made You". The song won at the 52nd Grammy Awards in the Grammy Award for Best Rap Performance by a Duo or Group category.

== Music video ==
During an interview for MTV, 50 Cent originally told that there were plans to make an animated music video for "Crack a Bottle", which was to be shot along with a music video for 50 Cent's song "I Get It In". On February 25, Eminem's manager Paul Rosenberg posted on his blog a still frame from the music video illustrating a homeless person holding a bottle wrapped in a brown bag. According to Rosenberg, it is directed by Syndrome and was planned to be released within a couple of weeks. The music video was playing on TV in Eminem's music video "3 a.m.", which has been directed by Syndrome as well. On May 7, 2009, an unfinished version of the video was released via TheRelapse.com, featuring Eminem's verse and chorus. Later during the same day, 50 Cent's rapped verse of the video was released via ThisIs50.com as well. This was added to the unfinished video on therelapse.com. A month later, on June 7, 2009, Cashis posted a link on Twitter to the full video in which he makes a cameo appearance. The music video portrays each rappers' style; Eminem's chaotic style, Dr. Dre's West Coast style, and 50 Cent's more club-oriented style. None of the performers are featured in the video. On August 1, 2022, the official music video was released on YouTube after 13 years.

== Awards and nominations ==
Year	Ceremony	Award	Result
2010	Grammy Awards	Best Rap Performance by a Duo or Group (with Dr. Dre and 50 Cent)	Won

== Track listing ==
Digital download

No.	Title	Writer(s)	Producer(s)	Length
1.	"Crack a Bottle"	Marshall Mathers; Andre Young; Curtis Jackson; Mark Batson; Dawaun Parker; Trevor Lawrence, Jr.; Jean Renard	Dr. Dre	5:15

Promotional CD single

No.	Title	Writer(s)	Producer(s)	Length
1.	"Crack a Bottle" (edited)	Marshall Mathers; Andre Young; Curtis Jackson; Mark Batson; Dawaun Parker; Trevor Lawrence, Jr.; Jean Renard	Dr. Dre	5:15
2.	"Crack a Bottle" (clean radio edit)	Mathers; Young; Jackson; Batson; Parker; Lawrence, Jr.; Renard	Dr. Dre	4:10
3.	"Crack a Bottle" (instrumental)	Mathers; Young; Jackson; Batson; Parker; Lawrence, Jr.; Renard	Dr. Dre	5:11
4.	"Crack a Bottle" (explicit)	Mathers; Young; Jackson; Batson; Parker; Lawrence, Jr.; Renard	Dr. Dre	5:15
5.	"Crack a Bottle" (super clean)	Mathers; Young; Jackson; Batson; Parker; Lawrence, Jr.; Renard	Dr. Dre	5:15
Total length:				25:06

== Chart performance ==
Since its release, "Crack a Bottle" has charted mainly in the United States, entering various charts including the Billboard Hot 100 and Hot R&B/Hip-Hop Songs. The song peaked in the top ten on the Hot Rap Tracks, reaching number four. After spending three consecutive weeks at number seventy-eight on the Hot 100, on Billboard's edition of February 21, 2009, "Crack a Bottle" reached the number one position on the Hot 100 due to sales of 418,000 downloads, becoming the fourth-biggest jump to the top of the Hot 100 in the chart's history. "Crack a Bottle" is Eminem's second song to peak the top the Billboard Hot 100 since "Lose Yourself", which it peaked number one in 2002 and 2003 for twelve weeks. With this song, Dr. Dre reached the top of the Hot 100 for a third time while this is 50 Cent's fourth. The song has also entered in various European national charts, including the Irish Singles Chart and UK Singles Chart, and also debuted at number one on the Canadian Hot 100, which was the first number one debut on the chart.

== Charts ==
=== Weekly charts ===
Weekly chart performance for "Crack a Bottle"
Chart (2009)	Peak position
Australia (ARIA)	18
Austria (Ö3 Austria Top 40)	41
Belgium (Ultratop 50 Flanders)	39
Belgium (Ultratip Bubbling Under Wallonia)	6
Brazil (ABPD)	24
Canada Hot 100 (Billboard)	1
Canada CHR/Top 40 (Billboard)	29
Croatia (HRT)	10
Czech Republic Airplay (ČNS IFPI)	10
Denmark (Tracklisten)	28
France (SNEP)	3
Ireland (IRMA)	6
Israel International Airplay (Media Forest)	8
Mexico Ingles Airplay (Billboard)	46
Netherlands (Single Top 100)	56
New Zealand (Recorded Music NZ)	6
Norway (VG-lista)	5
Sweden (Sverigetopplistan)	9
Switzerland (Schweizer Hitparade)	4
UK Hip Hop/R&B (Official Charts)	1
UK Singles (Official Charts)	4
US Billboard Hot 100	1
US Hot R&B/Hip-Hop Songs (Billboard)	60
US Hot Rap Songs (Billboard)	4
US Latin Rhythm Airplay (Billboard)	27
US Pop Airplay (Billboard)	22
US Rhythmic Airplay (Billboard)	6

=== Year-end charts ===
Year-end chart performance for "Crack a Bottle"
Chart (2009)	Position
Australia Hip-Hop/R&B Singles (ARIA)	33
Canada Hot 100 (Billboard)	80
UK Singles (Official Charts)	89
US Billboard Hot 100	47

== Certifications ==
Region	Certification	Certified units/sales
Australia (ARIA)	2× Platinum	140,000^{‡}
Brazil (Pro-Música Brasil)	Gold	30,000^{‡}
New Zealand (RMNZ)	Platinum	30,000^{‡}
United Kingdom (BPI)	Platinum	600,000^{‡}
United States (RIAA)	3× Platinum	3,000,000^{‡}
^{‡} Sales+streaming figures based on certification alone.

== Release history ==
Release dates and formats for "Crack a Bottle"
Region	Date	Format	Label(s)	Ref.
United States	February 3, 2009	Mainstream airplay	Interscope	

== See also ==
- Grammy Award for Best Rap Performance by a Duo or Group
- List of Hot 100 number-one singles of 2009 (U.S.)
- List of Hot 100 number-one singles of 2009 (Canada)
- List of UK R&B Singles Chart number ones of 2009
- List of Romanian Singles Chart top 10 Singles in 2009
