= Dawaun Parker =

American musician

- Also known as: D.Parker; D-Park; The One & Only; MostArt
- Born: Dawaun Parker; May 9, 1984 (age 42); Providence, Rhode Island, United States
- Origin: Boston, Massachusetts; Los Angeles, California
- Genres: Hip hop
- Occupations: Producer; songwriter; rapper
- Instruments: Keyboards; drums; guitar
- Labels: Aftermath; High Renaissance

Dawaun Parker (born May 9, 1984) is an American record producer and rapper. After graduating from Berklee College of Music in 2005, he became a producer for Dr. Dre’s record label Aftermath Entertainment. He received his first formal credit on 50 Cent’s Get Rich or Die Tryin' soundtrack, and contributed to several songs on Busta Rhymes' number 1 album, The Big Bang, as well as Jay-Z's return record, Kingdom Come. Parker co-wrote the number 1 single, "Crack a Bottle", by Eminem, Dr. Dre and 50 Cent, and co-produced nearly every track on Relapse.

On October 20, 2010, Parker released his first single, Lost, co-produced by Dr. Dre and featuring Phil Beaudreau. Since he left Aftermath sometime in 2014, he has been working on several projects, including production on Phil Beaudreau's album Ether.

== Production ==
- 50 Cent – Come & Go
- 50 Cent feat. Nicole Scherzinger & Young Buck – Fire
- 50 Cent – I Get It In
- 50 Cent – Talk About Me
- 50 Cent – Death To My Enemies
- 50 Cent feat. Eminem – Psycho
- 50 Cent – Straight to the Bank
- Bishop Lamont – No Stoppin' Carson
- Bishop Lamont – Grow Up
- Bobby Digital – Up Again
- Busta Rhymes – Get You Some
- Busta Rhymes – How We Do It Over Here
- Busta Rhymes feat. Nas – Don't Get Carried Away
- Busta Rhymes feat. Q-Tip – You Can't Hold The Torch
- Busta Rhymes – Legend Of The Fall Off's
- Busta Rhymes feat. Raekwon – Goldmine
- Busta Rhymes feat. Rick James – In The Ghetto
- Busta Rhymes feat. Stevie Wonder – Been Through The Storm
- Cory Gunz – Go Slow
- Dawaun Parker – Lost (Co-Produced By Dr. Dre)
- Dawaun Parker – Schemin'
- Eminem feat. Dr. Dre and 50 Cent – Crack A Bottle
- Eminem – Hello
- Eminem – Medicine Ball
- Eminem – Same Song & Dance
- Eminem feat. Dr. Dre – Old Time's Sake
- Eminem – Must Be the Ganja
- Eminem – 3 a.m.
- Eminem – My Mom
- Eminem – Insane
- Eminem – Bagpipes From Baghdad
- Eminem – We Made You
- Eminem – Stay Wide Awake
- Eminem – Déjà Vu
- Eminem – Underground
- Eminem – Im Having A Relapse
- Eminem feat. Dr. Dre – Hell Breaks Loose
- Eminem – Taking My Ball
- Eminem – Music Box
- Eminem – Drop The Bomb On 'Em
- Eminem – So Bad
- Eminem – Walk On Water
- Eminem – Premonition (Intro)
- Eminem – Alfred (Interlude)
- Eminem – Never Love Again
- Eminem – Little Engine
- Eminem – Lock It Up
- Eminem – Alfred (Outro)
- G.A.G.E. feat. Raekwon & Jabar – Goin Leave You
- Game – Blood of Christ
- Game – Dead People
- The GodBody – Beef
- The GodBody – The Fly Butter (Holy Smokes)
- The GodBody – Just Another Day
- The GodBody – Fell Off
- Jay Z – 30 Something
- Jay-Z – Lost One
- Jay-Z – Trouble
- Jay-Z feat. Ne-Yo – Minority Report
- Joe Budden – Hate Me
- Joyner Lucas - Just Like You
- Joyner Lucas - Lullaby
- Kendrick Lamar – Black Boy Fly
- Raekwon – Catalina
- Raekwon – About Me
- Snoop Dogg – Round Here
- Snoop Dogg feat. Dr. Dre and D'Angelo – Imagine
- Snoop Dogg feat. Nate Dogg and – Boss' Life
- Stat Quo – Get Low
- T.I. – Why You Wanna
- Travis Barker feat. The Clipse & Kobe – City Of Dreams
- Travis Barker and Yelawolf – Director's Cut
- Young Buck – Hold On
- Young Buck – U Ain't Goin' Nowhere

== Awards and nominations ==
Year	Award	Work
2009	Grammy Award Best Rap Album	Relapse
2009	Grammy Award Best Rap Performance By A Duo Or Group	"Crack a Bottle"
2010	Grammy Award Best Rap Album	Recovery
