= Young Buck discography =

Hip hop recording artist discography

- Studio albums: 6
- Extended plays: 2
- Singles: 20
- Music videos: 27
- Independent albums: 10
- Mixtapes: 32

American rapper Young Buck has released two studio albums, three independent albums, 6 collaborative albums, 32 mixtapes, 20 singles (including seven as a featured artist), and 27 music videos.

== Albums ==
=== Studio albums ===
List of albums, with selected chart positions, sales figures and certifications
Title	Album details	Peak chart positions										Certifications
Title	Album details	US	US R&B	US Rap	AUS	BEL (FL)	CAN	FRA	NL	SWI	UK	Certifications
Straight Outta Cashville	Released: August 24, 2004; Label: G-Unit, Interscope; Format: CD, LP, cassette, digital download	3	2	1	71	86	1	75	41	94	22	RIAA: Platinum
Buck the World	Released: March 27, 2007; Label: G-Unit, Interscope; Format: CD, LP, digital download	3	1	1	—	—	7	131	—	87	—	

=== Independent albums ===
List of albums, with selected chart positions
Title	Album details	Peak chart positions			
Title	Album details	US	US R&B	US Rap	US Ind
Born to Be a Thug	Released: October 10, 2002; Label: UTP Records, Thug Entertainment; Format: CD, LP, digital download	—	—	—	—
T.I.P.	Released: November 8, 2005; Label: Mass Appeal Entertainment; Format: CD, LP, digital download	40	11	8	2
The Rehab	Released: September 7, 2010; Label: Real Talk Entertainment; Format: CD, digital download	56	12	6	6
"—" denotes items that did not chart or were not released.

=== EPs ===
- Until Death (2018)(with Ghosts in the Room)
- From Lex to Ca$hville (2025)(with Tres Aurland)

=== Collaboration albums ===
with	Album details	Peak chart positions												Certifications
with	Album details	US	US R&B	US Ind	AUS	BEL	CAN	FRA	IRE	NZ	SWE	SWI	UK	Certifications
D-Tay	Thuggin' til the End: Released: August 22, 2000; Label: Next Level, Alternative Distribution Alliance; Format: CD, LP	—	34	17	—	—	—	—	—	—	—	—	—	
UTP Playas	The Compilation: Released: October 8, 2002; Label: Orpheus Records; Format: CD, LP	—	60	—	—	—	—	—	—	—	—	—	—	
G-Unit	Beg for Mercy: Released: November 14, 2003; Label: G-Unit, Interscope; Format: CD, LP	2	2	—	30	31	5	39	10	26	58	28	13	RIAA: 2× Platinum; MC: 2× Platinum; BPI: Gold
D-Tay	Da Underground Vol. 1: Released: June 15, 2004; Label: John Galt; Format: CD, LP	—	—	—	—	—	—	—	—	—	—	—	—	
G-Unit Records	Get Rich or Die Tryin': Released: November 8, 2005; Label: G-Unit, Interscope; Format: CD, LP	2	1	—	—	50	2	35	—	19	—	23	18	RIAA: Platinum
Savion Saddam	Salute to the Streetz: Released: June 1, 2012; Label: Cashville Records, CPK Musik; Format: CD, LP	—	—	—	—	—	—	—	—	—	—	—	—	
"—" denotes items that did not chart or were not released.

=== Remix albums ===
List of remix albums, with selected details
Title	Album details
The Rehab (Remix)	Released: October 25, 2019; Label: Real Talk Entertainment; Format: Digital download

=== Official mixtapes ===
List of mixtapes, showing year released
Title	Mixtape details
Welcome to the Hood (Hosted by: DJ Whoo Kid)	Released: May 31, 2004; Label: G-Unit, Cashville, Shadyville Entertainment
Case Dismissed – The Introduction of G-Unit South (Hosted by: DJ Drama)	Released: February 6, 2006; Label: G-Unit South, BCD Music Group
Chronic 2006 (Hosted by: Jamie Foxx & DJ Whoo Kid)	Released: August 4, 2006; Label: Shadyville Entertainment
Welcome to the Traphouse (Hosted by: DJ Drama)	Released: August 21, 2006; Label: G-Unit South
Mr. Ten-A-Key (Product of the South) (Hosted by: DJ Whoo Kid)	Released: September 4, 2007; Label: Shadyville Entertainment
Back for the Streets (Hosted by: The Future)	Released: April 11, 2009; Label: Cashville, 24Hour Grind
Back on My Buck Shit (Hosted by: DJ Smallz & DJ Scream)	Released: May 26, 2009; Label: Cashville
Only God Can Judge Me (Hosted by: Freeway Ricky Ross & Bigga Rankin)	Released: September 16, 2009; Label: Cashville, Strong Family Entertainment
Back on My Buck Shit Vol. 2: Change of Plans (Hosted/Produced by: Drumma Boy)	Released: October 31, 2010; Label: Cashville, Drum Squad
Live Loyal Die Rich (Hosted by: DJ Crisis & Drumma Boy)	Released: January 24, 2012; Label: Cashville, Drum Squad, Shut Up & Listen
Strictly 4 Traps N Trunks 44: Free Young Buck Edition (Hosted by: DJ Crisis)	Released: October 31, 2012; Label: Cashville, Traps N Trunks, Drum Squad, Shut Up & Listen
Before the Beast (Hosted by: DJ Whoo Kid)	Released: February 12, 2015; Label: Cashville, G-Unit South
10 Bullets (Hosted by: DJ Whoo Kid)	Released: April 7, 2015; Label: Cashville, G-Unit South
10 Bricks (Hosted by: DJ Whoo Kid)	Released: May 26, 2015; Label: Cashville, G-Unit South
10 Pints (Hosted by: DJ Whoo Kid)	Released: December 10, 2015; Label: Cashville, G-Unit South
10 Bodies (Hosted by: DJ Drama & DJ Whoo Kid)	Released: July 15, 2016; Label: Cashville, G-Unit South
10 Toes Down	Released: June 30, 2017; Label: Cashville, G-Unit South
10 Street Commandments	Released: December 1, 2017; Label: Cashville, G-Unit South
10 Plugs	Released: July 3, 2018; Label: Cashville, G-Unit South
10 Politics	Released: October 12, 2018; Label: Cashville, G-Unit South
10 Felonies	Released: October 31, 2018; Label: Cashville, G-Unit South
Box of Chocolates EP	Released: February 14, 2019; Label: The Dispensary
Compulsive	Released: April 12, 2019; Label: The Dispensary
The Impeachment (Soundtrack)	Released: November 21, 2019; Label: Cashville
Outbreak EP	Released: May 20, 2020; Label: Cashville
Vaccine	Released: February 19, 2021; Label: Cashville
Back on My Buck Shit, Vol. 3 (Hosted/Produced by: Drumma Boy)	Released: February 26, 2021; Label: Cashville, Drum Squad
40 Days and 40 Nights EP	Released: July 2, 2021; Label: Cashville
Renovation EP	Released: March 15, 2025; Label: Cashville
Target Practice EP	Released: July 2, 2025; Label: Street Flavor, Cashville

=== Collaboration mixtapes ===
List of mixtapes, showing year released
Title	Mixtape details
Starbucks (with: All Star)	Released: June 13, 2008; Label: Cashville, Inevitable Entertainment, GrindHard
Cashville Takeover (with: Cashville Records) (Hosted by: DJ Rip)	Released: February 3, 2009; Label: Cashville
601 to the 615 (with: Boo Rossini) (Hosted by: DJ D.A. and Bigga Rankin)	Released: June 22, 2010; Label: Cashville, Corporate Thugz Entertainment
G.a.S – Gangsta and Street (with: Tha City Paper)	Released: July 3, 2012; Label: Cashville, Drum Squad
Welcome 2 Cashville (with: Cashville Records)	Released: December 25, 2012; Label: Cashville, Traps-N-Trunks
G.a.S – Gangsta and Street 2 (with: Tha City Paper) (Hosted by: DJ Smallz)	Released: May 27, 2013; Label: Cashville, Drum Squad
Warrior Music (with: The Outlawz) (Hosted by: Young Noble, Hussein Fatal & DJ X-Rated)	Released: October 21, 2013; Label: Cashville, 1Nation
Gun Smoke (with: Chitty)	Released: May 14, 2017; Label: Cashville, MPR
Tenn EP (with: Tremaine)	Released: October 31, 2018; Label: Cashville

== Singles ==
=== As lead artist ===
List of singles, with selected chart positions and certifications, showing year released and album name
Title	Year	Peak chart positions						Album
Title	Year	US	US R&B	US Rap	AUS	GER	UK	Album
"Let Me In" (featuring 50 Cent)	2004	34	15	11	70	94	62	Straight Outta Cashville
"Shorty Wanna Ride"	2004	17	8	6	—	—	—	Straight Outta Cashville
"Look at Me Now" (featuring Mr. Porter)	2004	—	—	—	—	—	—	Straight Outta Cashville
"I Know You Want Me" (featuring Jazze Pha)	2006	—	67	—	—	—	—	Buck the World
"Get Buck"	2007	87	43	22	—	—	—	Buck the World
"U Ain't Goin' Nowhere" (featuring LaToiya Williams)	2007	—	57	—	—	—	—	Buck the World
"Bring My Bottles" (featuring 50 Cent & Tony Yayo)	2014	—	—	—	—	—	—	The Beast is G-Unit
"Can't Lose" (featuring Twanee)	2018	—	—	—	—	—	—	non-album single
"Too Rich"	2018	—	—	—	—	—	—	10 Plugs
"Narcos"	2018	—	—	—	—	—	—	10 Plugs
"Boom"	2018	—	—	—	—	—	—	10 Plugs
"—" denotes a title that did not chart, or was not released in that territory.

=== As featured artist ===
List of singles, with selected chart positions and certifications, showing year released and album name
Title	Year	Peak chart positions							Certifications	Album
Title	Year	US	US R&B	US Rap	AUS	CAN	NZ	UK	Certifications	Album
"P.I.M.P." (50 Cent featuring Snoop Dogg, Lloyd Banks and Young Buck)	2003	3	2	1	2	18	2	5	RIAA: Gold; ARIA: Platinum	Get Rich or Die Tryin'
"Stay Fly" (Three 6 Mafia featuring Young Buck and 8Ball & MJG)	2005	13	9	3	—	—	16	33	RIAA: 2× Platinum	Most Known Unknown
"I'll Whip Ya Head Boy" (50 Cent featuring Young Buck and M.O.P.)	2006	—	74	—	—	—	—	—		Get Rich or Die Tryin' soundtrack
"Give It to Me" (Mobb Deep featuring Young Buck)	2006	—	113	—	—	—	—	—		Blood Money
"Money in the Bank" (Lil Scrappy featuring Young Buck)	2006	28	7	5	—	—	—	—	RIAA: Platinum	Bred 2 Die Born 2 Live
"I Like the Way She Do It" (G-Unit featuring Young Buck)	2008	95	54	23	—	—	—	117		T.O.S: Terminate on Sight
"Rider Pt. 2" (G-Unit featuring Young Buck)	2008	122	83	—	—	—	—	—		T.O.S: Terminate on Sight
"—" denotes a title that did not chart, or was not released in that territory.

=== Other charted songs ===
List of songs, with selected chart positions, showing year released and album name
Title	Year	Peak chart positions	Album
Title	Year	US R&B	Album
"Right Thurr" (50 Cent featuring Young Buck)	2003	120	G-Unit Radio Part 3: Takin' It to the Streets
"Stomp" (featuring Ludacris and T.I.)	2004	110	Straight Outta Cashville
"—" denotes a title that did not chart, or was not released in that territory.

== Guest appearances ==
List of guest appearances, with other performing artists, showing year released and album name
Title	Year	Other performer(s)	Album
"All Black"	1999	D-Tay	Shippin' and Handlin', Vol. 2
"All My Life"	1999	First Born	Riders
"Purse First, Ass Last"	1999	First Born, Bun B	Riders
"Hard Hitters"	1999	First Born, D-Tay	Riders
"Caught in the Wind"	1999	First Born, 50	Riders
"M.E.M.P.H.I.S." _{(Produced by: DJ Paul, Juicy J)}	2000	Three 6 Mafia, Hypnotize Camp Posse	When the Smoke Clears: Sixty 6, Sixty 1
"Walk It Like Ya Talk It"	2001	Smoked Outt	Done Didit
"Wanda"	2001	Smoked Outt	Done Didit
"You Ready" _{(Produced by: Juvenile)}	2002	UTP Playas	The Compilation
"Neck Gone" _{(Produced by: Juvenile)}	2002	UTP Playas	The Compilation
"Less Than a Playa" _{(Produced by: Juvenile)}	2002	UTP Playas	The Compilation
"Streets Done Took Me Under" _{(Produced by: Juvenile)}	2002	UTP Playas	The Compilation
"Don't Be Fucking wit Me" _{(Produced by: Juvenile)}	2002	UTP Playas	The Compilation
"Warn Em'" _{(Produced by: Juvenile)}	2002	UTP Playas	The Compilation
"Outro" _{(Produced by: Shalmoney XL}	2002	UTP Playas	The Compilation
"Hey Yo!" _{(Produced by: Shalmoney XL )}	2002	UTP Playas, Lower Level	The Compilation
"You Want It (We Got It)" _{(Produced by: Juvenile)}	2002	Soulja Slim, Wacko, Godfather, Tara	The Compilation
"I Just Wanna Fuck You" _{(Produced by: Juvenile)}	2002	Juvenile, Wacko, Skip	The Compilation
"Ya'll in Trouble" _{(Produced by: Juvenile)}	2002	Lil Tee, Tank, Brother Mohammed, Chill, Tara	The Compilation
"Gotta Get It" _{(Produced by: Juvenile, JT the Bigga Figga)}	2002	Juvenile, JT the Bigga Figga, Billy Cook	Gotta Get It
"C.E.O. Stacks" _{(Produced by: Juvenile, JT the Bigga Figga)}	2002	Juvenile, JT the Bigga Figga, Skip	Gotta Get It
"A Lil Bit of Everything U.T.P." _{(Produced by: Juvenile)}	2002	G-Unit, UTP Playas	50 Cent Is the Future
"Luv 2 Get High" _{(Produced by: Juvenile)}	2002	B-Legit, Skip	Hard 2 B-Legit
"Nigger What" _{(Produced by: Juvenile)}	2003	Skip, Wacko	Live From Hollygrove
"Big Thangs" _{(Produced by: Juvenile)}	2003	Skip, Wacko	Live From Hollygrove
"Keep It Gangsta" _{(Produced by: Juvenile)}	2003	Skip, Wacko	Live From Hollygrove
"We Dont Play" _{(Produced by: Juvenile)}	2003	Skip, UTP Playas	Live From Hollygrove
"Right Thurr" _{(Produced by: The Trak Starz)}	2003	50 Cent	Takin' It To The Streets
"Blood Hound" _{(Produced by: Sean Blaze)}	2003	50 Cent	Get Rich or Die Tryin'
"Don't Start No Shit"	2003	Snoop Dogg	Welcome 2 Tha Chuuch Vol. 3 - Snoop Dogg For Prezident
"Chronic's Blowin"	2003	Snoop Dogg	Welcome 2 Tha Chuuch Vol. 3 - Snoop Dogg For Prezident
"Work Magic" _{(Produced by: Scram Jones)}	2004	Lloyd Banks	The Hunger For More
"I Luv da Hood"	2004	The Game	You Know What It Is Vol. 2
"Angels Around Me"	2004	DJ Kay Slay, 50 Cent, Lloyd Banks	The Streetsweeper, Vol. 2
"Killin Folks"	2004	MC Eiht, Skip	Smoke in tha City
"O It's On" _{(Produced by: Q)}	2004	Petey Pablo	Still Writing in My Diary: 2nd Entry
"Your Hood"	2004	DJ Green Lantern, Xzibit	Invasion Part Three: Countdown to Armageddon
"Loyal to the Game" _{(Produced by: Eminem, Luis Resto)}	2004	2Pac, G-Unit	Loyal To The Game
"I Know You Don't Love Me" _{(Produced by: Studio 44)}	2005	Tony Yayo, Lloyd Banks, 50 Cent	Thoughts of a Predicate Felon
"Datz Me"	2005	YoungBloodz	Ev'rybody Know Me
"Look Alive"	2005	Ras Kass, Strong Arm Steady	Institutionalized
"How The Hell"	2005	I-20, Ludacris	The DTP Mixtape
"Yappin'" _{(Produced by: Master P)}	2005	Master P	Ghetto Bill
"300 Shots"	2005	G-Unit, DJ Whoo Kid, M.O.P., Mobb Deep	The Return Of The Mixtape Millionaire
"Last of a Dying Breed" _{(Produced by: San "Chez" Holmes)}	2005	Young Jeezy, Trick Daddy, Lil Wil	Let's Get It: Thug Motivation 101
"You Already Know" _{(Produced by: The Outfit)}	2005	Lloyd Banks, 50 Cent	Get Rich or Die Tryin' OST
"I'll Whip Ya Head Boy" _{(Produced by: Ron Browz)}	2005	50 Cent	Get Rich or Die Tryin' OST
"Don't Need No Help" _{(Produced by: Hi-Tek, J. R. Rotem)}	2005		Get Rich or Die Tryin' OST
"Undertaker" _{(Produced by: Kevin "Khao" Cates)}	2006	T.I., Young Dro	King
"Rob the Robbers"	2006	Ludacris, I-20	Pre-Release Therapy
"I'm Bad"	2006	Quanie Cash	Loyalty & Respect Soundtrack
"Iceman" _{(Produced by: Dave Morris)}	2006	Lloyd Banks, Scarface, 8Ball	Rotten Apple
"That'z Me" _{(Produced by: DJ Cinema)}	2006	2Pac, Young Jeezy, Tony Gambino	Tupac Duets: NY 2 Cali
"Sleep" _{(Produced by: Sha Money XL)}	2006	2Pac, Chamillionaire	Pac's Life
"It'z Not a Dance" _{(Produced by: Johnny Juice)}	2006	C-Bo	The Money to Burn Mixtape
"They Shoot'n" _{(Produced by: Johnny Juice)}	2006	C-Bo, Spider Loc	The Money to Burn Mixtape
"Slow Down" _{(Produced by: Lyfe Jennings)}	2006	Lyfe Jennings, Doc Black	The Phoenix
"Straight Up" _{(Produced by: Gold Ru$h)}	2006	Trick Daddy	Back by Thug Demand
"Ain't Nothin' Like Me" _{(Produced by: The Underdogs)}	2007	Joe, Tony Yayo	Ain't Nothin' Like Me
"Ride or Die"	2007	Chauncey Black, Rah Digga	—N/a
"I'm Back"	2007	Ky-Mani Marley, Louie Rankin	Radio
"I Don't Lie"	2007	Haystak	The New South
"Tear It Up"	2007	Starlito	Starlito's Way
"Drank 'n' Drive"	2007	Ya Boy	The Fix
"26 Inches"	2007	Blood Raw	My Life: The True Testimony
"Fire" _{(Produced by: Dr. Dre)}	2007	50 Cent, Nicole Scherzinger	Curtis
"Don't Like Me"	2007	Hot Rod, Nyce Da Future	The Hitman
"Where You From"	2007	E.S.G.	—N/a
"Drivin Down the Freeway"	2007	The Outlawz, Snoop Dogg, Stormey	Cashville Takeover
"Fed's Takin' Pictures" _{(Produced by: Dame Grease)}	2007	DJ Drama, Rick Ross, Jim Jones, Willie The Kid, T.I., Young Jeezy	Gangsta Grillz: The Album
"Talk About Me" _{(Produced by: Nottz)}	2007	DJ Drama, Lloyd Banks, Tony Yayo	Gangsta Grillz: The Album
"God's Plan" _{(Produced by: Hi-Tek)}	2007	Hi-Tek, The Outlawz	Hi-Teknology 3: Underground
"Sukka Dukkas" _{(Produced by: Seven)}	2008	Skatterman & Snug Brim	Word on tha Streets
"If I Die II Night" _{(Produced by: Jean "JRock" Borges)}	2008	Bun B, Lyfe Jennings	II Trill
"Dead Wrong" _{(Produced by: Jake One)}	2008	Jake One	White Van Music
"Piano Man" _{(Produced by: Tha Bizness)}	2008	G-Unit	T.O.S: Terminate on Sight
"Rider Pt. 2" _{(Produced by: Rick Rock)}	2008	G-Unit	T.O.S: Terminate on Sight
"No Day's Off" _{(Produced by: Dual Output)}	2008	G-Unit	T.O.S: Terminate on Sight
"Party Ain't Over" _{(Produced by: Damien Taylor)}	2008	G-Unit	T.O.S: Terminate on Sight
"I Like The Way She Do It" _{(Produced by: Street Radio Inc)}	2008	G-Unit	T.O.S: Terminate on Sight
"Chase Da Cat" _{(Produced by: Kadis & Sean)}	2008	G-Unit	T.O.S: Terminate on Sight
"It Ain't a Problem" _{(Produced by: JT the Bigga Figga)}	2008	JT the Bigga Figga	Mandatory Business - Block Edition
"Ridin' Gettin' Blunted" _{(Produced by: Coop)}	2008	Starlito	I Love You, Too
"Go Hard"	2008	615	The Hustle Don't Stop
"Can't Tell Me Nothin"	2008	615	The Hustle Don't Stop
"Down South Hustlaz"	2009	Rick Ross, Bun B, Trae, Willie D	Deeper Than Rap
"I'm Fine"	2009	Colin Munroe	—N/a
"Round Me" _{(Produced by: Drumma Boy)}	2009	Drumma Boy, 8Ball & MJG	Back On My Buck Shit Vol. 2: Change Of Plans
"Ridin"	2009	Starlito	—N/a
"I Love You Too Much" _{(Produced by: Scorp-Dezel)}	2009	Starlito	I Love You, Too Much: The Necessary Evils
"Let's Get It"	2009	Bigg Steele, Glasses Malone	Back 2 Tha Basics
"Go Head"	2009	Blood Raw	The Real American Gangstaz
"Real Talk"	2009	Blood Raw, Young Jeezy	The Real American Gangstaz
"Trap Masters"	2009	Yo Gotti	Live from the Kitchen
"Break Ya Back"	2009	Will Roush, Redman, Stat Quo, Prodigy	—N/a
"Respect My Mind"	2009	Young Jeezy, Slick Pulla	Trappin' Ain't Dead
"Fuck You"	2009	The Outlawz	The Lost Songs Vol. 3
"Gang Injunction"	2009	JT the Bigga Figga	—N/a
"Nigga Owe Me Some Money" _{(Produced by: KLC)}	2009	B.G., C-Murder, Lil Boosie, Soulja Slim	Too Hood 2 Be Hollywood
"Whitney & Bobby"	2010	Jay'Ton, Rick Ross, Trae	Got It By Tha Ton
"Lego" _{(Produced by: Drumma Boy)}	2010	J. Futuristic	Mr. Futuristic 2 (Da Return Of Mr. Miyagi)
"Duece's & Trae's"	2010	Trae, Big Pokey	Can't Ban Tha Truth
"So Many"	2010	D Eazy, Crooked I	Street Lingo
"Issues" _{(Produced by: Drumma Boy)}	2010	2 Chainz, Dolla Boy	Trap-A-Velli 2: (The Residue)
"Business Man"	2010	Boo Rossini	A One Da Loud Pack
"Get to the Money"	2010	C-Bo	—N/a
"American Dream"	2010	Stix Izza	Bridge To Jupiter
"Out da Way"	2010	Brotha Lynch Hung	Da Coke Up Boss
"Sell Out Everything" _{(Produced by: The Runners)}	2010	DJ Freddy Fred, Murphy Lee, Gunplay	Return of a St. Lunatic
"Seen It All" _{(Produced by: Two Band Geeks)}	2010	The Outlawz	Killuminati 2K10
"This Side (Fuck Boy)" _{(Produced by: The Renegades)}	2010	Young Breed, Boo Rossini, Schife	Project Prezident
"Blow My High" _{(Produced by: Mpire)}	2011	The Outlawz, Trae	Killuminati 2K11
"So Long" _{(Produced by: Drumma Boy)}	2011	HK	—N/a
"Choppa Down" _{(Produced by: Billionaire Boyscout)}	2011	Waka Flocka, French Montana	Waka Flocka Myers Pt. 2
"Get Rowdy" _{(Produced by: Drumma Boy)}	2011	Drumma Boy, DJ Paul	Clash Of The Titans
"Quit Handcuffin' (Freestyle)"	2011	D12	Return Of The Dozen, Vol. 2
"Pay Off" _{(Produced by: Aone)}	2011	The Outlawz, Kastro	Perfect Timing
"I'm on Worldstar" _{(Produced by: Drumma Boy)}	2011	Drumma Boy, Gucci Mane, 2 Chainz	The Birth Of D-Boy Fresh
"Guilty" _{(Produced by: Drumma Boy)}	2011	Gucci Mane	Writings On The Wall 2
"Mad at Me"	2011	DJ Paul, Charlie P	Pray For Forgiveness
"She Got" _{(Produced by: Drumma Boy)}	2011	Kinfolk Thugs, PlayaFly, GK	There's Only 1 God
"What's Happening"	2011	Cashis, Spleen	—N/a
"People in the Streets" _{(Produced by: Coop)}	2011	Starlito	@ War W/ Myself
"Wake Up" _{(Produced by: Drumma Boy)}	2011	Starlito	Ultimate Warrior
"Big Dog" _{(Produced by: Celsizzle)}	2011	Starlito	Ultimate Warrior
"Gotta Whole Lotta" _{(Produced by: Coop)}	2011	Starlito, West	Ultimate Warrior
"Take Mine" _{(Produced by: Whiteboy Fresh)}	2011	Jmic, Layzie Bone	The Law of Attraction
"Got Em' Killed"	2012	Lil' Chris, Roc Child	I'm Up Next
"#ForeverScoob" _{(R.I.P. DJ Scooby)}	2012	Starlito, Stix Izza, Tha City Paper, Quanie Cash, Robin Raynelle	—N/a
"Car Cloudy"	2012	The Outlawz	Outlaw Rydahz, Vol. 1
"Callin' My Name" _{(Produced by: Y-Not for Soundsmith Productions)}	2012	C-Bo	Cali Connection
"Gun Shots" _{(Produced by: Mike Mosley)}	2012	C-Bo	Cali Connection
"Dedicated Hustler" _{(Produced by: Mike Mosley)}	2012	C-Bo	Cali Connection
"TN Boyz" _{(Produced by: Drumma Boy)}	2012	Criminal Mane, Don Trip	Welcome To My City 2
"All Kinds of Drugs" _{(Produced by: Big BOI Beats, Lex Luger)}	2012	Lil Wyte, Lil Wil	Still Doubted
"Something on Your Mind"	2012	Allie Baby, 2 Chainz	DJ Smallz - Southern Smoke Radio Pt. 11
"No Warning" _{(Produced by: Scorp-Dezel)}	2012	C-Bo, Big O	Orca
"On My Counter" _{(Produced by: Vibe)}	2012	Rukus 100	Money Hungry
"I Have Nothing" _{(Produced by: Coop)}	2012	Starlito	Produced by Coop: The Starlito Tape
"If I Have To" _{(Produced by: Coop)}	2012	Starlito	Produced by Coop: The Starlito Tape
"Ridin Gettin Blunted" _{(Produced by: Coop)}	2012	Starlito	Produced by Coop: The Starlito Tape
"Grind Hard 4 the $$" _{(Produced by: Coop)}	2012	Starlito, Yo Gotti, Robin Raynelle	Produced by Coop: The Starlito Tape
"By Myself" _{(Produced by: TMack)}	2012	MJG, TMack	Bitches Money Guns
"CTN Way" _{(Produced by: Certified Trunk Bangers)}	2012	Goatalini, Hambino, Clacc Dude	Actin' Brand New
"Breaking All the Rules" _{(Produced by: Koto)}	2013	Rukus 100	Smokin' Out the Pound
"Key to My Heart" _{(Produced by: 1320 Mega Def)}	2013	Rukus 100, The Fatal 4	Smokin' Out the Pound
"Hard Drugz" _{(Produced by: DJ King Assassin)}	2013	6 Tre G	El Trapo
"Talk About It" _{(Produced by: Broadway)}	2013	Charlie P	The Black Market
"Goonz"	2013	Cashis, Novoa	—N/a
"I Wanna Be Your Man" _{(Produced by: Mark Morrison)}	2013	K.O. MCcoy, Mark Morrison	Against The World
"Trap Phone" _{(Produced by: DJ Skinny)}	2013	Paperchase	The Next Big Thang Pt. 2
"Put da Clip In" _{(Produced by: Tha Advocate)}	2013	Young Noble, C-Bo	Outlaw Nation Vol. 2
"Tonite" _{(Produced by: Drumma Boy)}	2013	EDIDON, Hussein Fatal, Young Noble	O.G. Est. 1992
"Talk Nasty" _{(Produced by: Drumma Boy)}	2013	Gangsta Boo	It's Game Involved
"They Hate Me"	2013	Lil Scrappy	Reparations
"Top Down"	2013	Peter Jackson, G5ive	Good Company
"Living Dangerous"	2014	DJ Whoo Kid, Chris Webby	The N Word Bond Project
"Rolling Stone" _{(Produced by: The MeKanics)}	2014	DJ Kay Slay, Game, Papoose	The Rise of a City
"Out in a Blaze"	2014	Hussein Fatal, Young Noble, EDIDON, 2Pac	Jerzey Giantz
"Murda Barz"	2014	DJ OP, Styles P, Uncle Murda	I Refuse to Lose
"Devil’s Advocate"	2014	Tony Yayo	El Chapo 3
"Amerikkka"	2014	Tha City Paper, Paperchase	Paper View 2
"Action" _{(Produced by: Drumma Boy)}	2014	C-Good, Drumma Boy	—N/a
"Murda" _{(Produced by: Arkay)}	2014	DJ Kay Slay, Gunplay, N.O.R.E.	The Last Hip Hop Disciple
"Talk 2 Me"	2014	Lil Bankhead, Cap. 1, Jim Jones	—N/a
"Choppa on Deck"	2014	Yukmouth, C-Bo	GAS (Grow & Sale)
"The Reason Why"	2014	Daz Dillinger, Short Khop, Bo$$, Murphy Lee	Weed Money
"Memories"	2015	DJ Kay Slay, Freeway, Lil' Fame	The Industry Purge
"I Ain't Worried"	2015	Nat Lotto	—N/a
"Rock Ya Body"	2015	Twanée	The Purest Product, Volume 1
"Dealer"	2015	Obie Trice, Tone Tone	The Hangover
"Realest in the Game"	2015	Jadakiss, Sheek Louch	Top 5 Dead or Alive
"Nigga"	2015	50 Cent, Lil Boosie	The Kanan Tape
"Recession Back"	2015	Young Scooter, Lil Boosie	Married to the Streets 2
"We Thuggin"	2016	Freeway	Free Will
"Gangsta Muzik"	2017	DJ Kayslay, Ms. Hustle, Uncle Murda	Can't Knoc The Hustle
"Overtime"	2017	Freddie Gibbs	—N/a
"Keep Your Eyes on Me"	2017	DJ Kay Slay, Maino, Nick Grant	The Big Brother
"Can't Tell Me Nothing"	2017	DJ Kay Slay, Jay Rock, Raekwon, Meet Sims	The Big Brother
"Total Concentration"	2017	Kerser, Future, Ghosts in the Room	—N/a
"Easy"	2018	Riff Raff, Jimmy Wopo, DJ Afterthought	Cool Blue Jewels
"Godzilla" _{(Produced by: Yk808)}	2018	Berner, Philthy Rich	Rico
"Work" _{(Produced by: Rikanatti, The Punisher)}	2018	Cashis, Project Pat, Sullee J	Ima Ride
"Work (G-Mix)" _{(Produced by: Rikanatti, The Punisher)}	2018	Cashis, Flip Major, Goldie Gold, Project Pat, Sullee J	Ima Ride
"Kingpin" _{(Produced by: The Coalition)}	2018	Cashis, June B, Arez Cobain	Ima Ride
"MIA"	2020	Cassius Jay	Trap Sinatra 2
"Mawlee" _{(Produced by: Riot Ten, DJ Afterthought)}	2022	Riot Ten, DJ Afterthought	Ad Infinitum
"Rise Up" _{(Produced by: George Pettus)}	2023	Kelly Monrow	Rise Up
"Ain't Like Y'all" _{(Produced by: Young Seph)}	2024	Smallwood	Ain't Like Y'all
"Chrome on the Wheels"	2024	Landon Sears, Bubba Sparxxx	All Men Lie
"Expire"	2025	Deezy Hollow	—N/a
"Bulldozer"	2025	Vinnie Paz	God Sent Vengeance

== Remixes ==
Year	Song	Artist(s)	Album
2003	Throw It Up (Remix)	Lil Jon & the East Side Boyz, Pastor Troy	Part II
2003	P.I.M.P. (Remix)	50 Cent, Lloyd Banks, Snoop Dogg	Takin' It to the Streets (G-Unit Radio Part 3)
2004	Game Over (Flip) (Remix)	Lil Flip, Bun B	U Gotta Feel Me
2005	Hate It or Love It (Remix)	The Game, Tony Yayo, 50 Cent, Lloyd Banks	The Massacre
2007	Come Around (Remix)	Collie Buddz, Tony Yayo	Collie Budz
2007	B.U.D.D.Y. (Remix)	Musiq Soulchild, T.I.	Luvanmusiq
2007	Krispy (Remix)	Kia Shine, Swizz Beats, Jim Jones, Slim Thug, E-40, Remy Ma, LL Cool J	Due Season
2007	You Lying (Remix)	All Star	Starlito's Way 2: Internal Affairs
2008	Game's Pain (Remix)	The Game, Jadakiss, Pusha T, Keyshia Cole, Bun B, Fat Joe, Queen Latifah	LAX
2009	Not My Self (Remix)	Foxx	—N/a
2009	Shining Down (Remix)	Lupe Fiasco, Matthew Santos	Lasers
2009	Nigga Owe Me Some (Remix)	B.G., Lil Boosie, C-Murder, Soulja Slim, Plies	Too Hood 2 Be Hollywood
2009	Soldier of Love (Remix)	Sade	Soldier of Love (album)
2010	Stop Playin Wit Me (Remix)	Young Jeezy, Boo Rossini	—N/a
2010	Zone Money (Remix)	CJ Platinumn, Young Ralph	—N/a
2011	Dope Boy Sawg (Remix)	Tha City Paper	DOPaminE
2012	Na Wut (Remix)	Young Breed, Rick Ross, Billy Blue	—N/a
2012	Lean Wit It (Remix)	Meek Mill	—N/a
2012	Hard For The Money (Remix)	Brasco, N.O.R.E.	—N/a
2012	Body Bag (Remix)	Rolls Royce Rizzy, Lil Scrappy, Young Breed, Princess, Tom G	Y'all Sleep
2012	Hammer Time (Remix)	P.Grant, Gunplay	On The Grind
2013	Body Bag (Remix)	G.A., Lil Boosie	This Is Chopper City
2013	One False Move (Remix)	C-Murder, Akon, B.G., Cuttboy G Dinero	Ricochet
2013	God Don't Love Me (Remix)	Mistah F.A.B., Blast Holiday	The Coldest Winter Ever 2
2014	Shit (Remix)	Future	Bricktape
2014	Karate Chop (Remix)	Future, Lil Wayne	Bricktape
2014	Kemosabe (Remix)	Doe B, T.I., B.o.B, Birdman, Young Dro	Bricktape
2014	My Nigga (Remix)	YG, Jeezy, Rich Homie Quan	Bricktape
2014	LeBron James (Remix)	Yo Gotti	Bricktape
2014	The Devil Is a Lie (Remix)	Rick Ross, Jay-Z	Bricktape
2014	Worst Behavior (Remix)	Drake	Bricktape
2014	I B On Dat (Remix)	Meek Mill, Nicki Minaj	Bricktape
2014	This Is Murder Not Music (Remix)	50 Cent	Bricktape
2014	Fuck You (Remix)	Yo Gotti, Meek Mill	Bricktape
2014	Gunwalk (Remix)	Lil Wayne, Gudda Gudda	Bricktape
2014	Walk Thru (Remix)	Rich Homie Quan, Problem	Bricktape

== Music videos ==
List of music videos, with directors, showing year released
Title	Year	Director(s)
"Let Me In"	2004	Darren Lavett
"Shorty Wanna Ride"	2004	Gil Green
"Look At Me Now"	2004	Klasic
"I Know You Want Me"	2006	Paul Hunter
"Get Buck"	2007	Phillip G. Atwell
"U Ain't Goin' Nowhere"	2007	Gil Green
"Hold On"	2007	Gil Green
"Buck the World"	2007	Gil Green
"Play Foul"	2009	Willie Curtis
"When The Rain Stops"	2010	Damon Jamal
"Smoke Our Life Away"	2010	Young Buck
"Came Back"	2011	Jordan Tower
"I'm Done Wit Y'all"	2011	Black Fly Music
"Taxin"	2011	Black Fly Music
"Round Me"	2011	Mr. Boomtown
"Go Loco"	2011	Black Fly Music
"I'm Ready Now"	2011	Black Fly Music
"A Lotta Bodiez" (With: Hambino)	2011	Quanie Cash
"No Place For Me"	2012	Charlie P
"Oh My God" (With: Tha City Paper)	2012	Charlie P
"Word Iz" (With: Savion Saddam)	2012	Charlie P
"Rubberband Banks"	2013	Charlie P
"Something's Got Me On It"	2013	Charlie P
"Push"	2015	Charlie P
"Not This Time"	2015	
"Lean and Molly"	2015	
"Back To The Old Me"	2015	
"Bury The Bag"	2015	
"Can't Lose" (With: Twanee)	2018	
"Too Rich"	2018	
"Narcos"	2018	
"Boom"	2018	
