= Cashville =

Cashville may refer to:

- Cashville, South Carolina
- Cashville, Virginia
- Cashville Records
- Cashville Takeover
- a nickname for Nashville, Tennessee
