= Starbucks (mixtape) =

Mixtape by All Star and Young Buck
- Released: June 13, 2008
- Genre: Hip-hop
- Label: Ca$hville Records, Inevitable Entertainment, GrindHard
- Producer: Fate Eastwood, J.A., NYSE

All Star and Young Buck chronology
Starbucks	Starbucks 2 (TBD)

Starbucks is a mixtape by American rappers All Star Cashville Prince and Young Buck. The mixtape features exclusive tracks and freestyles from All Star and Young Buck with appearances by Yo Gotti, the Outlawz, $o$a Da Plug, and more. It was released for digital download and sale on iTunes on June 13, 2008. It was mainly released to promote the upcoming collab album Cashville Takeover from Ca$hville Records. Later in 2009, rapper Yo Gotti released the mixtape through his label Inevitable Entertainment.

== Track list ==
No.	Title	Performed By:	Length
1.	"Starbucks" (Intro)	All Star & Young Buck	0:28
2.	"Where You At"	All Star & Young Buck	4:51
3.	"Taped Conversation" (G-Unit Diss) (featuring Pharrell)	Young Buck	5:00
4.	"Shine On Em"	All Star	4:09
5.	"My Whole Life" (G-Unit Diss)	Young Buck	4:14
6.	"Jackin 4 Beats"	All Star	5:49
7.	"Money Rite" (featuring $o$a Da Plug)	All Star & Young Buck	3:58
8.	"All Eyes On Me"	Young Buck	2:56
9.	"I Got That"	All Star	4:00
10.	"My Interview" (50 Cent Diss)	Young Buck	3:37
11.	"Rap Music Ruined My Life"	All Star	5:34
12.	"You Lyin'" (featuring Grind Hard)	All Star & Young Buck	4:33
13.	"Flashing Lights Starstyle"	All Star	2:17
14.	"Kill Me A Nigga"	Young Buck	3:32
15.	"Grind Hard For The Money" (featuring Yo Gotti)	All Star & Young Buck	4:35
16.	"Flossin" (featuring Cowboy)	All Star & Young Buck	4:25
17.	"My Money On My Mind" (featuring $o$a Da Plug & The Outlawz)	All Star & Young Buck	4:19
18.	"A Milli"	All Star	3:39
19.	"Do Ya Thang"	All Star & Young Buck	3:17
