= Case Dismissed – The Introduction of G-Unit South =

Mixtape by Young Buck
- Released: August 29, 2006
- Genre: Hip-hop
- Label: G-Unit South, Aphilliates Music Group

Young Buck chronology
| Welcome To The Traphouse (2006) | Case Dismissed – The Introduction of G-Unit South (2006) | Cashville Takeover (2009) |

Case Dismissed – The Introduction of G-Unit South is a mixtape by rapper Young Buck, hosted by DJ Drama. DJ Drama celebrates Young Buck's legal victory in his case resulting from his arrest at the VIBE Awards with this mixtape introduction to the new G-Unit South branch. The mixtape features D-Tay, Lil Murda, Hi-C, Lil Scrappy, All Star Cashville Prince, and more. It was released on August 29, 2006. On the mixtape website DatPiff, it has been certified Bronze for being downloaded over 25,000 times.

== Background ==
The mixtape was one of three released by Young Buck to promote his upcoming 2007 album, Buck The World (the other two being Welcome To The Traphouse and Chronic 2006).

== Track list ==
| No. | Title | Performed by: | Length |
|---|---|---|---|
| 1. | "Case Dismissed!" (Intro) | Young Buck | 1:35 |
| 2. | "Come And Catch Me" (featuring Lil Scrappy & All Star Cashville Prince) | Young Buck | 5:05 |
| 3. | "You Can Get It Too" (featuring D-Tay) | Young Buck | 3:41 |
| 4. | "Real Niggas Across The World" | Young Buck | 1:20 |
| 5. | "Here We Come" (featuring D-Tay & 615) | Young Buck | 3:13 |
| 6. | "I Need A Freak" | Young Buck | 4:07 |
| 7. | "Move It Like I Do" (featuring D-Tay & Hi-C) | Young Buck | 3:35 |
| 8. | "Once A Month" | Young Buck & DJ Drama | 0:33 |
| 9. | "Postin' Up" (featuring Shannon Sanders) | Young Buck | 3:21 |
| 10. | "Where The Haters At" (featuring All Star Cashville Prince & 615) | Young Buck | 3:25 |
| 11. | "I'll Be Back" | Young Buck | 3:45 |
| 12. | "Let's Get Dirty" (featuring D-Tay & 615) | Young Buck | 2:39 |
| 13. | "G-Unit South" (featuring Hi-C) | Young Buck | 2:46 |
| 14. | "G Shit" | All Star Cashville Prince | 1:35 |
| 15. | "Hood Love" | Young Buck | 3:18 |
| 16. | "Money In The Bank" (featuring Young Buck) | Lil Scrappy | 3:54 |
| 17. | "Sippin' Purp" (featuring D-Tay) | Young Buck | 3:29 |
| 18. | "Pop A Pill" (featuring D-Tay & 615) | Young Buck | 3:13 |
| 19. | "We The Fuck Outta Here" | Young Buck | 1:45 |
| 20. | "War Witcha Homeboy" | Young Buck | 3:20 |
| 21. | "Shout Out To Pimp C & Project Pat" | Young Buck | 0:55 |
