= Welcome 2 Cashville =

Mixtape by Cashville Records
- Released: December 25, 2012
- Genre: Hip hop
- Label: Cashville, Traps-N-Trunks

Cashville Records chronology
Cashville Takeover (2009)	Welcome 2 Cashville (2012)

Welcome 2 Cashville is the second mixtape released by Young Buck featuring new music from the label's The Outlawz, Tha City Paper, Rukus 100, Sosa Tha Plug & Paperchase. The mixtape features exclusive tracks and freestyles from Cashville Records. Other Nashville, Ten-A-Keyans that appear on this project include CTN, Charlie P, Bezzled Gang, and Frank Wyte. It was released for digital download on December 25, 2012. One Cashville Records artist that didn't make it on the mixtape due to being in prison was West coast rapper C-Bo.

== Track listing ==
Welcome 2 Cashville track listing
No.	Title	Performed by:	Length
1.	"Bout Money" (featuring Rukus 100)	Young Buck	3:33
2.	"Turnt Up" (featuring Paperchase & Rukus 100)	Tha City Paper	4:39
3.	"Keep It Dirty"	Young Buck	2:54
4.	"Broke Bitch"	Charlie P	3:17
5.	"Shine"	Ice Cold Jay	3:54
6.	"My Garage" (featuring Tha City Paper & Tiko)	Generation X	3:49
7.	"Trap Phone" (featuring Young Buck)	Paperchase	4:19
8.	"The CTN Way" (featuring Young Buck)	CTN	4:47
9.	"Dusted" (featuring Young Buck)	Bezzeled Gang	4:34
10.	"God Bless Em"	Tha City Paper	3:13
11.	"Stupid Money" (featuring Blood Raw & Jimmie Hoff)	Young Buck	3:23
12.	"Peep Hole" (featuring Charlie P)	Young Buck	2:24
13.	"This Ain't That"	Rukus 100	3:34
14.	"Phone Jumpin"	Paperchase	3:49
15.	"Blink" (featuring Young Buck)	Frank Whyte	4:09
16.	"My City" (featuring Tha City Paper)	Dirty Diana	3:30
17.	"How To Shake It"	Paperchase	3:40
18.	"What It Do" (featuring The Outlawz & Sosa Tha Plug)	Young Buck	5:20
19.	"Kill Me A Nigga" (featuring Rukus 100)	Charlie P	3:32
