= Frenzy! =

Studio album by D'Prince
- Released: 5 November 2012
- Genre: Afro pop
- Length: 78:55
- Label: Mavin
- Producers: Don Jazzy (also exec.); Babyfresh; Altims; Aone Beats; Spellz; Joshbeatz

D'Prince chronology
Solar Plexus (2012)	Frenzy! (2012)	Lavida (2019)

Singles from Frenzy!
- 1. "Goody Bag" Released: 31 October 2012; 2. "Call Police" Released: 31 October 2012; 3. "Real G" Released: 31 October 2012

Frenzy! is the debut studio album by Nigerian singer D'Prince. The standard edition was released in stores on 5 November 2012 and the deluxe edition was released digitally on 16 November 2012, through Mavin Records. The album features guest appearances from Don Jazzy, Wande Coal, Wizkid, Tiwa Savage, Sinzu, Dr Sid, Timaya, Bracket, Eva, Ice Prince, M.I, General Pype, and Young Breed. Production was handled by Don Jazzy, Babyfresh, Altims, Aone Beats, Spellz, and Joshbeatz. The album received mostly negative reviews from critics, who cited weak lyrics and a lack of clear direction. Frenzy! earned D'Prince a nomination for Hip Hop World Revelation of the Year at the 2013 edition of the Headies.

== Background ==
Mo' Hits Records was a Nigerian record label co-founded by D'banj and Don Jazzy, the latter being the brother of D'Prince. Its roster included D'Prince, Wande Coal, Dr Sid, and Kayswitch. The label disbanded in 2012 following reported creative differences between its founders. After the split, D'banj launched DB Records, while Don Jazzy established Mavin Records on 8 May 2012. The label debuted the same day with the compilation album Solar Plexus, which included songs such as "Oma Ga" and "Take Banana". D'Prince began work on Frenzy! following several years of solo releases and collaborations. He first gained wider recognition in 2009 with songs such as "Omoba" and "Ooze", the latter featuring Wande Coal. Although plans for a debut album were announced during this period, its release was delayed as his profile in the industry continued to grow. He later appeared on Samklef's "Molowo Noni" alongside Ice Prince and Wizkid, and released "Give It To Me" featuring D'banj in 2010. Following the dissolution of Mo' Hits Records, D'Prince joined Mavin Records, where he became the first artist to issue a full-length studio album under the label.

== Singles and other releases ==
"Goody Bag", "Call Police", and "Real G" featuring M.I were released on 31 October 2012. All three tracks were produced by Don Jazzy. The same day, D'Prince released the video for the remix of his song "Take Banana" off Solar Plexus (2012). "Goody Bag" was nominated for Best Pop Single at the 2013 edition of the Headies. D'Prince released the video to the second track, "Journey of a Thousand Miles" featuring Don Jazzy and Wande Coal, on 5 August 2013. The video was shot and directed by Godfather Productions in South Africa.

== Critical reception ==
Professional ratings
Review scores
Source	Rating
TayoTV	6/10
Nigerian Entertainment Today	3/5 stars

Ayomide Tayo of Nigerian Entertainment Today described the album as a flashy but inconsistent debut that excels in delivering party anthems but lacks substance overall. He praised tracks like "Journey of a Thousand Miles" for their inspirational tone but criticized others for weak lyrics, noting, "You may have one hell of a ride bumping this album, but you’ll be left with a nasty hangover the morning after." The album received a rating of 3/5. The review received backlash from D'Prince's labelmate Dr Sid, who criticized the 3/5 rating and accused the review of bias. Defending D'Prince on Twitter, Dr. Sid described the album as "banging" and questioned the credibility of the reviewers, stating, "Abi dem pay you money to knock the hardworking boy down?" A writer for TayoTV who goes by the moniker Teaponpi described Frenzy! by D'Prince as an album with strong production and catchy beats, but criticized it heavily for weak lyrics and lack of artistic direction. While a few tracks featuring guest artists like Tiwa Savage, Wizkid, and Wande Coal stood out, most solo efforts were dismissed as shallow or poorly written. Rating it 6/10, the writer concluded "If you are willing to listen to an album with great beats and careless for lyrics, i recommend Frenzy! but if you want something with lyrical content? Yeah.. keep it moving!".

=== Accolades ===
Awards and nominations for Frenzy!
Organization	Year	Category	Result	Ref.
The Headies	2013	Hip Hop World Revelation of the Year	Nominated	

== Track listing ==
Frenzy! track listing
No.	Title	Writer(s)	Producer(s)	Length
1.	"Bad Girls"	Charles Enebeli	Don Jazzy	2:21
2.	"Journey of a Thousand Miles" (featuring Don Jazzy and Wande Coal)	Enebeli; Michael Ajereh; Oluwatobi Ojosipe	Don Jazzy	5:00
3.	"Goody Bag"	Enebeli	Don Jazzy	3:48
4.	"Amina" (featuring Dr Sid)	Enebeli; Sidney Esiri	Don Jazzy	4:11
5.	"Africa Zumba"	Enebeli	Don Jazzy; Babyfresh^{[a]}	3:47
6.	"Painting the Town" (featuring Wizkid)	Enebeli; Ayodeji Balogun	Don Jazzy; Babyfresh^{[a]}	4:50
7.	"Carry It Up" (featuring Timaya)	Enebeli; Inetimi Odon	Don Jazzy; Babyfresh^{[a]}	3:33
8.	"Believe"	Enebeli	Don Jazzy	3:42
9.	"Call Police"	Enebeli	Don Jazzy	3:13
10.	"Real G" (featuring M.I)	Enebeli; Jude Abaga	Don Jazzy	4:19
11.	"Overdose and Jonzing" (featuring Young Breed)	Enebeli; Young Breed	Don Jazzy; Babyfresh^{[a]}	4:37
12.	"Shower"	Enebeli	Don Jazzy; Babyfresh^{[a]}	3:55
13.	"Ife" (featuring Tiwa Savage)	Enebeli; Tiwatope Savage	Don Jazzy	4:02
14.	"By Myself"	Enebeli	Joshbeatz	3:51
15.	"Because of Love" (featuring Bracket)	Enebeli; Nwachukwu Ozioko; Obumneme Ali	Spellz	3:50
16.	"Get Some"	Enebeli	Don Jazzy	3:14
17.	"Ojoro" (featuring Wande Coal)	Enebeli; Ojosipe	Spellz	3:11
18.	"No More Sleeping On 'Em" (featuring Wizkid)	Enebeli; Balogun	Aone Beats	4:47
19.	"Chant"	Enebeli	Don Jazzy	3:40
20.	"Thank You"	Enebeli	Don Jazzy; Babyfresh^{[a]}; Altims^{[a]}	3:57
21.	"Skit"	Enebeli	Don Jazzy	0:24
Total length:				78:55

Deluxe edition bonus tracks
No.	Title	Writer(s)	Producer(s)	Length
22.	"L.O.V.E You" (featuring Wande Coal)	Enebeli; Ojosipe	Don Jazzy	3:58
23.	"Tortoise" (featuring Wande Coal, Sinzu, General Pype, Eva, and Ice Prince)	Enebeli; Babalola Falemi; Ibrahim Majekodunmi; Eva Alordiah; Panshak Zamani	Don Jazzy	5:35
24.	"Take Banana" (remix)	Enebeli	Don Jazzy; Altims^{[a]}	4:17
25.	"Mr. World Critic" (skit)	Enebeli; Ajereh	Don Jazzy	2:21

Notes

- ^{^[a]} signifies an co-producer.

== Personnel ==
- Charles Enebeli - vocals, songwriter
- Oluwatobi Ojosipe - vocals, songwriter
- Ayodeji Balogun - vocals, songwriter
- Tiwatope Savage - vocals, songwriter
- Babalola Falemi - vocals, songwriter
- Sidney Esiri - vocals, songwriter
- Inetimi Odon - vocals, songwriter
- Bracket (Nwachuwku Ozioko and Obumneme Ali) - vocals, songwriters
- Eva Alordiah - vocals, songwriter
- Panshak Zamani - vocals, songwriter
- Jude Abaga - vocals, songwriter
- Ibrahim Majekodunmi - vocals, songwriter
- Young Breed - vocals, songwriter
- Don Jazzy - vocals, songwriter, producer (all tracks)
- Babyfresh - co-producer (5, 6, 7, 11, 12, 20, 23)
- Joshbeatz - producer (14)
- Spellz - producer (15, 17)
- Aone Beats - producer (18)
- Altims - co-producer (20, 24)

== Release history ==
Release history and formats for Frenzy!
Region	Date	Version	Format	Label	
Nigeria	5 November 2012	Standard	CD	Mavin	
Nigeria	Various	16 November 2012	Deluxe	Mavin	Digital download
