= Before the Beast =

Mixtape by Young Buck
- Released: February 12, 2015
- Genre: Hip-hop
- Length: 25:07
- Label: G-Unit South

Young Buck chronology
Strictly 4 Traps N Trunks 44: Free Young Buck Edition (2012)	Before the Beast (2015)	10 Bullets (2015)

Before the Beast is a seven-track mixtape by rapper Young Buck, hosted by DJ Whoo Kid. It is the first official mixtape from Buck under G-Unit after being dismissed from the group in 2008. The mixtape features seven exclusive tracks from Young Buck with appearances by his label mates Lloyd Banks, Tony Yayo, Kidd Kidd, and more. It was released for digital download on February 12, 2015.

== Background ==
The mixtape was released by Young Buck to promote the upcoming G-Unit EP, The Beast Is G-Unit.

== Track listing ==
No.	Title	Producer(s):	Length
1.	"Life" (featuring Tony Yayo and Kidd Kidd)	Bandplay	4:09
2.	"Count Me Out"	Bandplay	3:31
3.	"Been Dat Nigga"	Drumma Boy	2:51
4.	"Pull Up" (featuring Boosie Badazz and Cap 1)	True Wealth of Drum Squad	3:42
5.	"Ain't Gone Fool Me" (featuring Trae Tha Truth)	Sonny Digital, Metro Boomin	3:38
6.	"Push"	Drumma Boy	2:34
7.	"Exclusive" (featuring Lloyd Banks, Yo Gotti and Lil Reese)	Doe Pesci	4:38
