= Lavida =

Lavida may refer to:

- Volkswagen Lavida, a compact car
- Lavida (EP), an EP by D'Prince
