= Welcome to the Traphouse =

Mixtape by Young Buck
- Released: August 21, 2006
- Genre: Hip-hop
- Length: 70:26
- Label: G-Unit South

Young Buck chronology
| Chronic 2006 (2006) | Welcome to the Traphouse (2006) | Case Dismissed – The Introduction of G-Unit South (2006) |

Welcome to the Traphouse is a mixtape by rapper Young Buck, hosted by DJ Drama. The mixtape features exclusive tracks and freestyles from Young Buck with appearances by Pimp C, All Star Cashville Prince, Yo Gotti, B.G., and more. It was released for digital download on August 21, 2006. This is the second of three mixtapes released by Buck to promote his upcoming album, Buck the World.

== Track list ==
| No. | Title | Length |
|---|---|---|
| 1. | "Work Wit It" (featuring Yo Gotti, All Star & Lil Murda) | 5:18 |
| 2. | "Welcome to the Traphouse" (Skit) | 0:29 |
| 3. | "Oooh Nooo" (featuring 615) | 3:50 |
| 4. | "Prepare for War" | 4:38 |
| 5. | "Niggas Change" (featuring Shannon Sanders) | 4:04 |
| 6. | "Rap Money" | 2:51 |
| 7. | "Make It Home" (featuring Pimp C & 615) | 3:11 |
| 8. | "Cmon" | 1:51 |
| 9. | "South Ain't Lyrical?" (Skit) | 0:39 |
| 10. | "I'm a G" (featuring 615) | 4:03 |
| 11. | "Don't Make Me Hurt You" (featuring Tony Yayo) | 2:18 |
| 12. | "Piecin Out My Pack" (featuring CP & 615) | 4:22 |
| 13. | "Twistin My Blunt" | 4:36 |
| 14. | "Still" (featuring CP & 615) | 3:59 |
| 15. | "Let's Ride" (featuring Anthony Hamilton) | 2:21 |
| 16. | "Thuggin Til My Death Date" | 3:09 |
| 17. | "I Got Mine" (featuring B.G.) | 4:37 |
| 18. | "How U Wanna Act" | 2:40 |
| 19. | "Drink & Drive" (featuring 615) | 2:55 |
| 20. | "Buck the World (Coming Soon)" (Skit) | 0:50 |
| 21. | "Heavenly Father" | 3:27 |
| 22. | "All by Myself" (featuring 50 Cent) | 4:18 |
