= DJ Smallz =

American hip-hop DJ

DJ Smallz is an American hip-hop DJ, known for his Southern Smoke mixtapes as well as his weekly show on Sirius Satellite Radio and DISH Network, Southern Smoke Radio. His tapes have featured such artists as Young Buck, Ludacris, Master P, Lil Wayne, B.o.B, Outlawz KO McCoy, Drake, and Chingy, Yung Berg, and Juicy J with Project Pat.

== Mixtapes ==
- Southern Smoke Radio Pt. 1
- Southern Smoke Radio Pt. 2
- Southern Smoke Radio Pt. 3
- Southern Smoke Radio Pt. 4
- Southern Smoke Radio Pt. 5
- Southern Smoke Radio Pt. 6
- Southern Smoke Radio Pt. 7
- Southern Smoke Radio Pt. 8
- Southern Smoke Radio Pt. 9
- Southern Smoke Radio Pt. 10
- 2011: This That Southern Smoke!
- 2012: Southern Smoke Radio Pt. 11
- 2012: This That Southern Smoke! Vol. 2
- 2012: This That Southern Smoke! Vol. 3
- 2013: This That Southern Smoke! Vol. 4
- 2013: This That Southern Smoke! Vol. 5
- 2013: This That Southern Smoke! Vol. 7
- 2013: This That Southern Smoke! Vol. 8

=== Hosted mixtapes ===
- 2006: Drake - Room for Improvement
- 2007: B.o.B - Cloud 9
- 2008: Cash Daddy, MeatSpady, Meek Mill - Streets May Be Icy
- 2009: Young Buck - Back on My Buck Shit (hosted with DJ Scream)
- 2009: Diamond - P.M.S.: Pardon My Swag
- 2009: Ahmad da God - Northern Dope
- 2009: Juicy J & Project Pat - Cutthroat
- 2013: Young Buck & Tha City Paper - G.a.S – Gangsta and Street 2
- 2014: Stekaly tha Singer - Panic Disorder the Prequel
