= Back on My Buck Shit =

Mixtape by Young Buck
- Released: May 26, 2009
- Genre: Hip-hop
- Label: Ca$hville Records

Young Buck chronology
Back for the Streets (2009)	Back on My Buck Shit (2009)	Only God Can Judge Me (2009)

Back on My Buck Shit is a mixtape by rapper Young Buck, hosted by DJ Smallz and DJ Scream. The mixtape features exclusive tracks and freestyles from Young Buck with appearances by All Star Cashville Prince, Lil Wayne, Yo Gotti, and Plies. It was released for digital download on May 26, 2009. The mixtape is volume one of a three-volume release. However, instead of DJ Smallz and DJ Scream, volumes two and three are hosted by Drumma Boy.

== Background ==
Due to contract issues with G-Unit Records and a feud with label head 50 Cent, Young Buck was unable to release a new album. With help from DJ Smallz and DJ Scream, Buck released an official mixtape strictly for his fans through his record label, Ca$hville Records.

== Track list ==
No.	Title	Length
1.	"Back on My Buck Shit" (Intro)	1:21
2.	"Did You Miss Me"	4:14
3.	"Way Out Here"	3:08
4.	"Everythings on Sale"	3:46
5.	"Smoke Break"	1:09
6.	"I Just Done It"	3:13
7.	"You Gotta Love It"	2:46
8.	"Letter to the Labels"	3:02
9.	"Real Nigga Thoughts"	1:29
10.	"My City"	3:08
11.	"30 Birds Away"	3:25
12.	"Nuthin’ on It"	2:54
13.	"Bag It Up" (featuring All Star & Yo Gotti)	3:34
14.	"Win, Lose or Draw"	1:20
15.	"Lose My Mind"	2:23
16.	"A Lot to Learn"	2:50
17.	"What They Talkin’ Bout" (featuring Plies)	2:48
18.	"Who Run It"	2:45
19.	"Back on My Buck Shit" (Outro)	1:00
20.	"Somebody Gon’ Pay"	3:01
21.	"Let the Beat Rock"	3:12

bonus track
No.	Title	Length
22.	"Ups and Downs" (featuring Lil' Wayne)	4:18
