= Movin' On (Playa Fly album) =

Studio album by Playa Fly
- Released: June 16, 1998
- Recorded: 1996
- Studio: Freetoes Productions
- Genres: Memphis rap, Southern hip-hop, underground hip-hop
- Length: 1:01:51
- Label: Super Sigg Records
- Producers: Playa Fly (Exec. Van Siggers); Blackout; Psycho; Tahilo; Rusty

Playa Fly chronology
Fly Shit (1996)	Movin' On (1998)	Just Gettin' It On (1999)

Movin' On is the third studio album completed by Playa Fly in 1998, the album was under a 3 album contract deal with Super Sigg Records. Bill Chill died shortly before the album's completion.

== Background ==
Movin On recorded in 1996 in Memphis, Tennessee. Movin on is the third studio album by Playa Fly, in 1996 playa fly completed Fly Shit which was his second studio album, "Funk-N-Buck" was originally intended for the album and was later released under movin on. Playa fly stayed late nights out in different studios commonly in warehouses just as his previous projects such as Just Gettin' It On. Most notably, the studio he used to record songs like "M-M-M" and "Movin On" was "Freetoes Productions"

== Altercation ==
Movin' On, Playa Fly's 1998 album. Initially, Playa Fly, who was once a member of Three 6 Mafia and went by the name Lil' Fly, parted ways with the group due to personal and professional conflicts that included issues over money and creative control. After his departure, tensions rose between Playa Fly and Three 6 Mafia, culminating in a series of diss tracks throughout the mid-late 1990s.

Movin' On marked a mature point in Fly's career, as he avoided direct disses toward Three 6 Mafia, believing at the time that the beef was cooling down. By 1996, both Playa Fly and Three 6 Mafia had already taken shots at each other through various tracks—Three 6 Mafia in "Gotcha Shakin" and Playa Fly on earlier releases like Just Gettin' It On released disses like "Triple Bitch Mafia". But on Movin' On, Fly took a more introspective approach, focusing on his own journey and growth rather than continuing the feud.

In 1999, however, Playa Fly reignited the conflict by re-releasing Just Gettin' It On, signaling that tensions with Three 6 Mafia had not fully resolved. Later that same year, on his album Da Game Owe Me, Fly included direct disses toward Three 6 Mafia, reinforcing that the rivalry was still alive. This feud reflects a long-standing tension that impacted both artists' careers and the Memphis rap scene during the 1990s.

== Singles ==
"Funk-N-Buck", made originally in 1996, was included in this album.

== Track listing ==
Movin' On
No.	Title	Length
1.	"Intro"	0:29
2.	"M-M-M Ft. Bill Chill"	5:42
3.	"Situation"	6:08
4.	"Movin' On"	4:57
5.	"Start Runnin'"	4:56
6.	"I-B-N"	5:17
7.	"Still Iz On"	5:15
8.	"Nobody Needs Nobody ft. Gangsta Blac"	5:45
9.	"Luv da Hay Ft. Gangsta Blac"	6:06
10.	"Funk-N-Buck"	6:23
11.	"Write Sum Bump"	5:58
12.	"Outro"	4:47
