= Live Loyal Die Rich =

Mixtape by Young Buck
- Released: January 24, 2012
- Genre: Hip-hop
- Length: 74:42
- Label: Ca$hville Records, Drum Squad, Shut Up & Listen
- Producer: Drumma Boy, Aone, Celsizzle, Lil Lody, Bassline, Jussi Jaakola, Freeway TJay, 3ftfty7, DJ Pain, Yung Berg, Drumma Drama, Syk Sense, Boss Devito, J-Mac & 4th Quarter

Young Buck chronology
Back On My Buck Shit Vol. 2: Change Of Plans (2010)	Live Loyal Die Rich (2012)	Strictly 4 Traps N Trunks 44: Free Young Buck Edition (2012)

Singles from Live Loyal Die Rich
- 1. "I'm Ready Now" Released: August 31, 2011; 2. "Touchdown" Released: November 8, 2011; 3. "Go Loco" Released: November 24, 2011; 4. "No Place For Me" Released: April 11, 2012; 5. "Dusted" Released: October 8, 2012; 6. "Somethings Got Me On It" Released: June 22, 2013

Professional ratings
Review scores
Source	Rating
HipHopDX	4.5/5 stars
PopMatters	7/10 stars
XXL	3/5 stars

Live Loyal Die Rich is a mixtape by rapper Young Buck, hosted by DJ Crisis and Drumma Boy. The mixtape features exclusive tracks and freestyles from Young Buck with appearances by The Outlawz, All Star Cashville Prince, and more. It was released for digital download on January 24, 2012.

== Background ==
Due to contract issues with G-Unit Records and a feud with label head 50 Cent, Young Buck couldn't release a new album. With help from Drumma Boy and Drum Squad Records, Buck released an official mixtape through his record label, Cashville Records, and Drumma Boy's label, Drum Squad Records. Live Loyal Die Rich is an official release from Young Buck since dropping Back On My Buck Shit Vol. 2: Change Of Plans back in 2010.

"I'm Ready Now", produced by Boss DeVito, was the first track released off the mixtape along with the music video featuring Shannon Sanders on August 11, 2011.

"Touchdown" was the second single released off Live Loyal Die Rich; it featured an appearance from CTN. The music video was released on November 8, 2011.

"Go Loco" was the third and final single released off Live Loyal Die Rich before its release date on January 24, 2012. The music video was shot in Nashville's Elite Clothing store, with a guest feature from Tha City Paper and a cameo appearance from DJ Crisis. The video was released on November 24, 2011.

"No Place For Me" was the fourth single released off the mixtape. The music video was shot in Nashville and released April 11, 2012. The video was directed by Charlie P and BlackFlyMusic. It was the first music video released off Live Loyal Die Rich after its January 24 release.

"Dusted" was the fifth single released off the mixtape. The music video was shot in Nashville and released October 8, 2012. The video was directed by Charles M. Robinson. It was the second music video released off Live Loyal Die Rich after its January 24 release.

"Somethings Got Me On It" was the sixth single released off the mixtape. The music video for the song was released June 22, 2013. It was the third music video released off Live Loyal Die Rich after its January 24, 2012 release.

== Track listing ==
Live Loyal Die Rich track listing
No.	Title	Producer	Length
1.	"2nd Chance"	Bass Line	4:59
2.	"Shit Head"	Celsizzle	4:30
3.	"Somethings Got Me on It"	Jussi Jaakola	4:30
4.	"Go Loco" (featuring Tha City Paper)	Freeway TJay	3:49
5.	"No Place for Me"	Celsizzle	2:44
6.	"Money In the Walls"	3ftfty7	3:24
7.	"Drug Related"	Aone	3:22
8.	"Death of Me"	Celsizzle	3:08
9.	"Touch the Ceilings" (featuring All Star)	Lil Lody	4:28
10.	"Personal" (featuring Cruna)	DJ Pain	3:24
11.	"Car Cloudy" (featuring The Outlawz)	Freeway TJay	4:42
12.	"Think They Know"	Drumma Boy	3:39
13.	"Closer to My Dreams" (featuring Goapele & Hambino)	Yung Berg Young Buck	4:19
14.	"Hate on Me"	Celsizzle	3:33
15.	"No Smiles"	Drumma Drama	3:42
16.	"Touchdown" (featuring CTN)	Celsizzle	4:42
17.	"21 and Up"	J-Mac & 4th Quarter	3:14
18.	"Get It All"	Lil Lody	3:21
19.	"Dusted" (featuring Bezzeled Gang)	Syk Sense	4:32
20.	"I'm Ready Now" (featuring Shannon Sanders)	Boss Devito	4:40
