= G.a.S – Gangsta and Street 2 =

Mixtape by Young Buck and Tha City Paper
- Released: May 27, 2013
- Genre: Southern hip-hop
- Label: Ca$hville Records, Drum Squad
- Producer: G.O.T.H.A.M. City, Drumma Boy

Young Buck and Tha City Paper chronology
G.a.S – Gangsta and Street (2012)	G.a.S – Gangsta and Street 2 (2013)

Singles from G.a.S - Gangsta and Street 2
- 1. "I See Why" Released: February 23, 2013

G.a.S – Gangsta and Street 2 is the second mixtape by rappers Young Buck and Tha City Paper. The mixtape features exclusive tracks and freestyles from Tha City Paper and Young Buck. It was released on May 27, 2013.

== Track listing ==
No.	Title	Producer(s)	Length
1.	"Freeway Rick Ross Speaks"		1:07
2.	"One More Time"	Chizzy, Mike & Sarah J	3:14
3.	"I See Why"	G.O.T.H.A.M City	3:27
4.	"Throwed Off"	Jokaa & Sarah J	3:47
5.	"Pussy Bill"	Mouse On Tha Track	3:23
6.	"Amerika" (featuring Paperchase)	G.O.T.H.A.M City	4:42
7.	"Disrespectful"	G.O.T.H.A.M City	3:39
8.	"Plastic Bag"	Chizzy, Mike & Sarah J	3:20
9.	"Reason I Ball" (featuring Rukus 100)	Chris & Sarah J	4:05
10.	"I Ball Hard" (featuring Grenade Strap & Cocaine)	2G's	3:43
11.	"God Bless Em"	G.O.T.H.A.M City	3:30
12.	"Scale & Trap Phone"	Brandon Broadway Settles	3:27
13.	"Mama Spot" (featuring Generation X)	Brandon Broadway Settles	3:56
14.	"Rubberband Banks"	Purps	3:52
