= Perfect Timing (Outlawz album) =

Studio album by Outlawz
- Released: September 13, 2011
- Recorded: 2009–2011
- Genre: Gangsta rap
- Length: 62:08
- Label: UMG; Fontana; 1Nation; Ca$hville; Krude
- Producer: Outlawz (exec.); Cozmo, Maxwell Smart, Beatnick & K-Salaam, Jay Mac, Focus..., AONE, Aktual, Tha Formula, Lex Lucazi, Automatik BEATZ

Outlawz chronology
| Killuminati 2K11 (2011) | Perfect Timing (2011) | Livin' Legendz (2016) |

Singles from Perfect Timing
- 1. "100 MPH" Released: May 3, 2011

Professional ratings
Review scores
| Source | Rating |
|---|---|
| XXL | 4/5 stars |
| HipHop DX | 3/5 stars |

Perfect Timing is the sixth studio album by American hip-hop group Outlawz, consisting of members Hussein Fatal, Young Noble and E.D.I. Perfect Timing missed its original March 2011 release date and was finally released on September 13, 2011, the fifteenth anniversary of 2Pac's death.

== Track listing ==
| No. | Title | Producer(s) | Length |
|---|---|---|---|
| 1. | "Intro – Change Gon Come" (featuring Prentice of Tru Soul) | Beatnick & K-Salaam | 1:42 |
| 2. | "Perfect Timing" (featuring Chae & Tony Williams) | Jay Mac for Dark City | 4:15 |
| 3. | "Keep It Lit" (featuring Yung Phat Pat) | Focus... | 4:36 |
| 4. | "Fast Lane" (featuring King Malachi) | Beatnick & K-Salaam | 3:45 |
| 5. | "Pay Off" (featuring Young Buck & Kastro) | AONE | 3:26 |
| 6. | "Paranoid" (featuring ABN & June Summers) | Cozmo | 4:23 |
| 7. | "Pushin On" (featuring Scarface & Lloyd) | Maxwell Smart | 4:25 |
| 8. | "Tell Me Sumthin Good" | Cozmo | 3:44 |
| 9. | "Once in a Lifetime" (featuring Aktual) | Aktual | 3:55 |
| 10. | "So Clean" (featuring Stormey Coleman) | Tha Formula | 3:57 |
| 11. | "100 MPH" (featuring Bun B & Lloyd) | Cozmo | 4:04 |
| 12. | "Remember Me" (featuring Tony Williams) | Tha Formula | 3:27 |
| 13. | "Borrowed Time" (featuring Livya Lee) | Aktual | 3:46 |
| 14. | "Dont Wait" (featuring Krayzie Bone & Aktual) | Lex Lucazi | 4:34 |
| 15. | "New Years" (featuring Tech N9ne) | Tha Formula | 4:14 |
| 16. | "All the Time" (featuring Belly) | Automatik BEATZ | 3:55 |
