= Salute to the Streetz =

Studio album by Young Buck and Savion Saddam
- Released: June 1, 2012
- Recorded: 2010–2012
- Genre: Hip-hop
- Label: Ca$hville Records, CPK Musik
- Producer: Young Seph

Singles from Salute to the Streetz
- 1. "Birdshit" Released: September 17, 2011; 2. "My City" Released: September 17, 2011; 3. "Put It All on the Line" Released: May 8, 2012

Salute to the Streetz is a compilation album by rappers Young Buck and Savion Saddam that was released for digital download June 1, 2012, through Ca$hville Records and CPK Musik.

== Background ==
Young Buck joins forces with Kinston, North Carolina's Savion Saddam to drop a collaboration album.

The first singles were released on September 17, 2011, along with music videos for the songs "Birdshit" and "My City".

On May 9, 2012, Savion Saddam released four tracks, including the intro "Salute" off the album, via his official Twitter account.

== Track listing ==
No.	Title	Produced by:	Length
1.	"Salute" (Intro)	Young Seph	3:14
2.	"My City" (Remix)	Young Seph	3:45
3.	"Put It All On The Line"	Young Seph	3:30
4.	"Birdshit"	Young Seph	3:43
5.	"Shine On 'Em"	Young Seph	3:18
6.	"Mr. Sportscenter (Throw Away Money)" (featuring Slim Gutta)	Young Seph	4:24
7.	"Gangsta Dick"	Young Seph	2:52
8.	"If I Had U"	Young Seph	3:38
9.	"Rucker"	Young Seph	2:42
10.	"Bang Dat"	Young Seph	2:58
11.	"Tourchure" (featuring Ion Philly)	Young Seph	4:04
12.	"Word Iz"	Young Seph	4:15
13.	"He Snitchin" (featuring Hugg E Bear)	Young Seph	2:55
14.	"Struggling" (featuring Charlie P & Lin Mercer)	Young Seph	4:31
