= G.a.S – Gangsta and Street =

Mixtape by Young Buck and Tha City Paper
- Released: July 3, 2012
- Genre: Southern hip-hop
- Label: Ca$hville Records, Drum Squad
- Producer: G.O.T.H.A.M. City, Drumma Boy, Charlie Heat, Sarah J, 2G's, Freeway TJay, SAT, 2Much, BTP

Young Buck and Tha City Paper chronology
G.a.S – Gangsta and Street (2012)	G.a.S – Gangsta and Street 2 (2013)

Singles from G.a.S - Gangsta and Street
- 1. "Oh Lord" Released: June 17, 2012

G.a.S – Gangsta and Street is a mixtape by rappers Young Buck and Tha City Paper. The mixtape features exclusive tracks and freestyles from Tha City Paper and Young Buck.

== Background ==
This is the first project Tha City Paper released through Ca$hville Records since signing to the label in early 2012.

Young Buck released the first single off the mixtape called "Oh Lord" when he posted it to his ReverbNation account and then tweeted it to his fans from his official Twitter account on June 17, 2012.

== Track list ==
No.	Title	Producer(s)	Length
1.	"Intro"		0:17
2.	"No B.S."	G.O.T.H.A.M. City	3:56
3.	"Oh Lord"	G.O.T.H.A.M. City	3:25
4.	"Breaker Breaker"	Charlie Heat & Sarah J	3:06
5.	"No Competition"	2G's	3:04
6.	"Go Loco"	Freeway TJay	3:17
7.	"Turn Myself In"	G.O.T.H.A.M. City	3:37
8.	"Money Talk"	Sarah J	2:51
9.	"Collect Call"	Charlie Heat & Sarah J	3:23
10.	"I'm Hard"	2G's	3:02
11.	"Interlude"		0:27
12.	"Your Not Here"	SAT & Sarah J	2:47
13.	"Droppin It Off"	G.O.T.H.A.M. City	3:21
14.	"Don Dada"	2Much, BTP & Sarah J	3:37
15.	"I Don't Know"	Drumma Boy	3:51
16.	"Out My Mind"	Charlie Heat & Sarah J	3:37
17.	"Lotta Hoes"	G.O.T.H.A.M. City	3:25
18.	"Shootem Up" (featuring Quanie Cash)	G.O.T.H.A.M. City	4:58
19.	"Shake the City"	G.O.T.H.A.M. City	3:16
20.	"Yo Turn" (featuring Hambino)	G.O.T.H.A.M. City	4:18
21.	"Outro"		0:30

iTunes Store Deluxe Edition bonus tracks
No.	Title	Producer(s)	Length
22.	"Head Up"	G.O.T.H.A.M. City	3:22
23.	"Thowed Off"	Jokaa & Sarah J	2:56
24.	"'U Reason I Ball"	Hits by Chris & Sarah J	3:00
25.	"Dope Boy"	Broadway	5:04
