= Chronic 2006 =

Mixtape by Young Buck
- Released: August 4, 2006
- Genre: Hip-hop
- Length: 56:35
- Label: Shadyville Entertainment

Young Buck chronology
| Welcome To The Hood (2005) | Chronic 2006 (2006) | Welcome To The Traphouse (2006) |

Chronic 2006 is a mixtape by rapper Young Buck, hosted by Jamie Foxx and DJ Whoo Kid. The mixtape features exclusive tracks and freestyles from Young Buck with appearances by Mobb Deep, Lil Scrappy, M.O.P., and more. It was released for digital download on August 4, 2006.

== Background ==
The mixtape was one of three released by Young Buck to promote his upcoming album Buck The World (the other two being Welcome To The Traphouse and Case Dismissed – The Introduction of G-Unit South).

== Track list ==
| No. | Title | Performed by: | Length |
|---|---|---|---|
| 1. | "Chronic 2006" (Intro) | Jamie Foxx | 0:57 |
| 2. | "Doin' My Thing" | Young Buck | 2:49 |
| 3. | "Thug Til Your Death Day" | Young Buck | 3:48 |
| 4. | "Ride" | Young Buck | 3:42 |
| 5. | "Chronic 2006" (Skit) | Jamie Foxx | 0:07 |
| 6. | "Do It Myself" (featuring 50 Cent) | Young Buck | 3:47 |
| 7. | "Dont Make Me Hurt You" (featuring Tony Yayo) | Young Buck | 2:25 |
| 8. | "Return Of The Project Nigga" | Young Buck | 2:59 |
| 9. | "Vibe Awards" (Skit) | | 1:03 |
| 10. | "Niggas A Change On You" | Young Buck | 2:17 |
| 11. | "Gettin High" | Young Buck | 3:27 |
| 12. | "Married To My Gun" | Young Buck | 2:19 |
| 13. | "Get That Brick" (featuring Hi-C) | Young Buck | 2:51 |
| 14. | "Vibe Awards" (Skit #2) | | 0:59 |
| 15. | "Stomp That Snitch" (featuring 615) | Young Buck | 3:56 |
| 16. | "Skit" | Jamie Foxx | 0:06 |
| 17. | "Project Niggas" (featuring Mobb Deep) | Young Buck | 3:54 |
| 18. | "Vibe Awards" (Skit #3) | | 0:40 |
| 19. | "On The Corner" | Young Buck | 2:57 |
| 20. | "The Projects" (featuring Tony Yayo & Lil Murda) | Young Buck | 1:41 |
| 21. | "Guns Go Bang" (featuring M.O.P.) | Young Buck | 3:24 |
| 22. | "Skit" | Jamie Foxx & Lil Scrappy | 0:12 |
| 23. | "Money In The Bank" (featuring Lil Scrappy) | Young Buck | 3:56 |
| 24. | "Freak" (featuring DJ Drama) | Young Buck | 3:55 |
