= Playa Fly =

American rapper from Memphis, Tennessee

- Also known as: Lil' Fly Lil Flizy
- Born: September 2, 1977 (age 48); Memphis, Tennessee
- Genres: Hip-hop; Memphis rap; gangsta rap
- Occupation: Rapper
- Years active: 1993–present

Playa Fly (born Ibn Young; September 2, 1977) is an American rapper from Memphis, Tennessee. Pursuing a solo career as Playa Fly, he released one independent album before signing a three-album contract with Super Sigg Records. During that period he had many underground hits, perhaps the most famous being "Nobody Needs Nobody". Fly's early hit immediately gained notoriety from the song "Triple Bitch Mafia", which lashed out against his former group.

== Biography ==
=== Super Sigg ===
In 1996, Playa Fly released his first album with Super Sigg, Fly Shit. The album had songs such as "Nappy Hair & Gold Teeth", "Da Show", "Crownin' Me", "Flizy Comin' (Triple Bitch Mafia pt.2)" and "Work To Do". It included other artists such as Gangsta Blac, Bill Chill, Criminal Manne, Icy K, D-A-V, Tay-Dog and Playa Posse. This album was also where Fly began his association with producer Blackout.

In 1998, Movin' On was released. Movin' On had such tracks as "Situation", "Start Runnin", "Nobody", "Funk-N-Buck" and "Write Sum Bump". It also featured Gangsta Blac, Bill Chill (Fly's father), Minnie Mae Mafia, and Cool B. Fly's father died shortly before this album's completion.

Just Gettin' It On, a re-release of his underground solo CD (with a bonus track), was released by Diamond in March 1999. Da Game Owe Me was released in November of the same year, the last album to be released by Super Sigg Records. Just Gettin' It On had songs like "Gettin' It On", "Just Awaken Shaken", "Triple Bitch Mafia" and "Fuck A Wanna Be". Just Gettin' It On included the Minnie Mae Mafia, Terror, Lil' Yo, Gangsta Blac and the late Bill Chill. The album's bonus track, "Fuck A Wanna Be", had a video made for it (under the title "Just A Wanna Be") and is Playa Fly's only music video. Da Game Owe Me featured Gangsta Blac, Thaistik, Blackout and Terror.

=== Minnie Mae Muzik ===
After leaving Super Sigg, Playa Fly created his own label named after his grandmother, Minnie Mae Muzik. On this label, Fly began production on Fly2K along with the forces of Diamond Records. Midway through the project, Fly was arrested for possession of narcotics and sent to prison to serve a seven-year sentence in 1999. The release date for Fly2K was pushed back from 2000 to 2002. Playa Fly was still present on his album while he was in prison, as he rapped a cappella over the phone ("Flexxin' Skit" and "Sap Sucka"). Fly2K was released in November 2002, the album included such songs like "Bill Chill Lives" (a tribute to Bill Chill), "Universal Heartthrob", "Here Fly Come", "Club Friendly", "We Ain't Playin Witcha", "Life Goes On" and "Few & Da Proud". The album included other artist like Mista Tito, Maimi Miane, D-A-V, Bubba Wiley, Thaistik, DeRico, R-E-G and LaCynthia.

In mid-2006, Fly was released from prison and resumed his career, with a new album planned - Mafia All Day. On July 5, a single "Horses", was featured on the XXL website. In addition to his release, Fly joined the New Prophet Camp.

In December 2010, Playa Fly released the single "Blast Off", taken from the new Mafia All Day album that has been delayed for more than two years.

== Discography ==
=== Albums ===
- 1993: From Da Darkness Of Da Kut (as Lil Fly) (underground album)
- 1996: Fly Shit
- 1998: Movin' On - US R&B Albums #90
- 1999: Just Gettin' It On
- 1999: Da Game Owe Me - US R&B Albums #63
- 2002: Fly2K - US R&B Albums #64, Top Independent Albums #33
- TBA: Mafia All Day

=== Mixtapes ===
- 2007: Prepare Or Beware: Da Mafia Massacre
- 2010: K.O.A.K. (King of All Kings) Produced by DJ Scream
- 2011: Fly In July

== Guest appearances ==
Year	Song	Artist(s)	Album
2012	"Welcome" (featuring Zed Zilla & Playa Fly)	Young Dolph	Welcome To My City 2
