= Only God Can Judge Me (mixtape) =

Mixtape by Young Buck
- Released: September 16, 2009
- Genre: Hip-hop
- Length: 53:03
- Label: Ca$hville Records, Strong Family Entertainment

Young Buck chronology
Back On My Buck Shit (2009)	Only God Can Judge Me (2009)	Back On My Buck Shit Vol. 2: Change Of Plans (2010)

Only God Can Judge Me is a mixtape by rapper Young Buck, hosted by Freeway Ricky Ross and Bigga Rankin. The mixtape features exclusive tracks and freestyles from Young Buck with appearances by All Star Cashville Prince, 8Ball & MJG, Lupe Fiasco, Yo Gotti, and more. It was released for digital download on September 16, 2009. Due to contract issues with G-Unit Records and a feud with label head 50 Cent, Young Buck could not release a new album, so through his own label, Cashville Records, and Strong Family Entertainment, he released an official mixtape for his fans.

== Track list ==
No.	Title	Produced by:	Length
1.	"Only God Can Judge Me" (Intro)		2:05
2.	"Without Me" (featuring 8Ball & MJG)	Drumma Boy	3:41
3.	"Sellin’ Dope Again"	Melle Mel & Bigga Rankin	2:24
4.	"Serve Me" (featuring Cruna)	Melle Mel & Bigga Rankin	2:45
5.	"Nuthins Gonna Stop Me"	Melle Mel & Bigga Rankin	3:25
6.	"Grind Don’t Stop (That Money)"	Melle Mel & Bigga Rankin	3:22
7.	"Anticipation"	Melle Mel & Bigga Rankin	2:24
8.	"You Know I Got It" (featuring All Star)	Melle Mel & Bigga Rankin	2:45
9.	"Can’t Catch Me"	Melle Mel & Bigga Rankin	2:09
10.	"Don’t Want Nuthin’"	Melle Mel & Bigga Rankin	2:56
11.	"Somethin On My Books"	Melle Mel & Bigga Rankin	4:41
12.	"Play Foul" (featuring All Star)	Melle Mel & Bigga Rankin	2:47
13.	"That Work"	Melle Mel & Bigga Rankin	2:32
14.	"Money Maker" (featuring All Star & Yo Gotti)	Melle Mel & Bigga Rankin	3:35
15.	"Feelin’ Like A Million"	Melle Mel & Bigga Rankin	3:15
16.	"Bill Time"	Melle Mel & Bigga Rankin	2:58
17.	"Get High"	Melle Mel & Bigga Rankin	1:50
18.	"Burn Out"	Melle Mel & Bigga Rankin	2:22
19.	"Shinin’ Down (Remix)" (featuring Lupe Fiasco)	Soundtrakk	2:06
20.	"Only God Can Judge Me" (Outro)		3:01
