= The Rehab =

Studio album by Young Buck
- Released: September 7, 2010
- Recorded: 2008–2010
- Genre: Gangsta rap, southern hip hop, crunk
- Length: 42:50
- Label: Real Talk Entertainment
- Producer: Derrick "Sac" Johnson (Exec.) Vince V., Cozmo, Big Hollis, Warrington, Real Talk Ent.

Young Buck chronology
They Don't Bother Me (2007)	The Rehab (2010)	Straight Outta Cashville 2 (TBA)

Singles from The Rehab
- 1. "When the Rain Stops" Released: May 18, 2010; 2. "Ya Betta Know It" Released: June 8, 2010; 3. "Hood Documentary" Released: September 7, 2010

Professional ratings
Review scores
Source	Rating
Allmusic	3.5/5 stars
ThaCorner	2.5/5 stars

The Rehab is the fifth solo studio album and third independent album by rapper Young Buck. It was released on September 7, 2010. A remix version was released in 2019.

== Background ==
Originally intended to be his third studio album, its release was promised since early 2008, but was repeatedly pushed back due to Young Buck's problems with G-Unit and 50 Cent. At one point, Buck made an exaggerated claim to buy himself out of his contract with G-Unit Records that The Rehab would sell a million copies in its first week. The track "Hood Documentary" is a diss track directed at 50 Cent. The announcement came amidst rumors that 50 Cent had finally released Buck from his G-Unit contract. On September 13, 2010 an interview with Shade 45 radio host Angela Yee, 50 Cent stated Young Buck was still signed to G-Unit Records at that time.

== Commercial performance ==
The Rehab debuted at number 55 on the U.S. Billboard 200 chart, selling over 6,400 units in its first week.

== Singles ==
"When the Rain Stops" became the first single when it was released to iTunes on May 18, 2010. "Ya Betta Know It" became the second single when it was released on iTunes on June 8, 2010. "Hood Documentary" is the third and final single. A music video was released for the single "When the Rain Stops".

== Track listing ==
No.	Title	Producer(s)	Length
1.	"Tha Streetz"	Hollis	1:25
2.	"This Is Mine"	Vince V. & Warrington	4:15
3.	"Smoke Our Life Away"	Vince V.	5:01
4.	"Statistics"	Real Talk Ent.	0:46
5.	"Keep It Moving"	Hollis	3:50
6.	"Hood Documentary"	Vince V.	4:07
7.	"Ya Betta Know It"	Hollis	3:22
8.	"When the Rain Stops"	Cozmo	3:57
9.	"Not Killing Me"	Vince V.	3:51
10.	"Nothin' 4 Ya"	Hollis	3:11
11.	"The Bust"	Real Talk Ent.	0:58
12.	"Like a Million"	Hollis	3:32
13.	"Leave It Alone"	Vince V.	3:09
14.	"Reality Check"	Hollis	1:25
