= Prince of the Ville =

Studio album by All Star Cashville Prince
- Released: October 25, 2005
- Genres: Southern hip hop, Hardcore rap, Gangsta rap
- Labels: Loyalty Records, Inevitable Records

All Star Cashville Prince chronology
Prince of the Ville (2005)	Starlito's Way 2 (2007)

Prince of the Ville is the debut album by rapper All Star Cashville Prince, it was released through the independent label, Loyalty Records & Inevitable Records. Guest appearances include Young Paper and Yo Gotti.

== Track list ==
No.	Title	Length
1.	"Prince of the Ville" (Intro)	0:12
2.	"Whole Name [produced by Fate Eastwood]"	4:34
3.	"Like Me [produced by Fate Eastwood]"	4:13
4.	"252 [produced by Fate Eastwood]" (featuring Young Paper)	4:12
5.	"Prince of the Ville [produced by Fate Eastwood]"	4:09
6.	"Sloppy Jocko [produced by Fate Eastwood]"	4:34
7.	"Whip Game [produced by Fate Eastwood]" (featuring Young Paper)	4:17
8.	"Hard But Fair [produced by Fate Eastwood]"	3:54
9.	"Real Hustlers [produced by Fate Eastwood]" (featuring Yo Gotti)	3:21
10.	"Ohh! [produced by Fate Eastwood]"	4:28
11.	"You Ain't Gotta Clue [produced by Fate Eastwood]"	5:01
12.	"Get Ya Paper Up [produced by Fate Eastwood]" (featuring Tha City Paper)	4:24
13.	"Prince of the Ville" (Outro)	0:13
