= Back on My Buck Shit Vol. 2: Change of Plans =

Mixtape by Young Buck
- Released: October 31, 2010
- Genre: Hip-hop
- Length: 64:26
- Label: Ca$hville Records, Drum Squad
- Producer: Drumma Boy (exec.)

Young Buck chronology
Only God Can Judge Me (2009)	Back on My Buck Shit Vol. 2: Change of Plans (2010)	Live Loyal Die Rich (2012)

Professional ratings
Review scores
Source	Rating
PopStache	3/5 stars
HipHopDX	4.5/5 stars

Back on My Buck Shit Vol. 2: Change of Plans is a mixtape by rapper Young Buck, hosted by Drumma Boy. The mixtape features exclusive tracks and freestyles from Young Buck with appearances by The Game, The Outlawz, Lupe Fiasco, and more. It was released for digital download on October 31, 2010. The mixtape is volume two of a three-volume release. However, instead of DJ Smallz and DJ Scream, volume two is hosted and produced by Drumma Boy. On the mixtape website DatPiff, it has been certified Silver for being downloaded over 50,000 times.

== Background ==
Due to contract issues with G-Unit Records and a feud with label head 50 Cent, Young Buck could not release a new album. With help from Drumma Boy and Drum Squad Records, Buck released an official mixtape for the streets through his record label Ca$hville Records and Drumma Boy's label Drum Squad Records. The mixtape sold 70,000 copies in the first week of its release. As of 2011, it has sold up to 500,000 copies, which was certified gold record sales.

== Track list ==
No.	Title	Produced By:	Length
1.	"Let Me Go"	Drumma Boy	3:14
2.	"Came Back"	Drumma Boy	3:43
3.	"Got Me One"	Drumma Boy	4:31
4.	"In the Clouds"	Drumma Boy	4:07
5.	"AM/FM" (featuring Lupe Fiasco)	Drumma Boy	3:40
6.	"Cleaned Off" (featuring The Outlawz)	Drumma Boy	3:32
7.	"Betta Tell 'Em" (featuring 8Ball)	Drumma Boy	4:11
8.	"Identify" (featuring Rocko)	Drumma Boy	4:03
9.	"U Know What It Is" (featuring MJG & 2 Chainz)	Drumma Boy	3:51
10.	"I'm Done wit Y'all"	Drumma Boy	4:33
11.	"Mark Barton"	Drumma Boy	2:31
12.	"The Blues" (featuring The Game)	Drumma Boy	2:52
13.	"Gettin' It"	Drumma Boy	4:13
14.	"Lockdown"	Drumma Boy	3:17
15.	"The Streets"	Drumma Boy	2:35
16.	"Down wit 'Em"	Drumma Boy	3:51
17.	"Taxin'"	Drumma Boy	4:20

Bonus track
No.	Title	Produced by:	Length
18.	"Round Me" (Drumma Boy featuring Young Buck & 8Ball & MJG)	Drumma Boy	4:42
