= Cashville, Virginia =

Unincorporated community in Virginia, United States

Coordinates: 37°42′07″N 75°48′30″W

Cashville is an unincorporated community in Accomack County, Virginia, United States.
