= Welcome to My City 2 =

Studio album by Drumma Boy
- Released: March 30, 2012
- Genre: Southern hip hop
- Label: Drum Squad Records
- Producer: Drumma Boy (exec.); Don Vito, Mars, DJ Squeeky, Degree, Peezy, Fate Eastwood

Drumma Boy chronology
The Birth of D-Boy Fresh (2010)	Welcome to My City 2 (2012)

Welcome to My City 2 is the third studio album by rapper Drumma Boy. The album features exclusive tracks from Drumma Boy with appearances by Young Buck, Gangsta Boo, DJ Paul, Juicy J, 8 Ball & MJG and more. It was released for digital download on March 30, 2012.

== Track listing ==
Welcome to My City 2 track listing
No.	Title	Producer	Length
1.	"From da City" (DJ LL featuring Drumma Boy, Kristyle, B-Hav, Lionheart, GK, Degree, Allie Baby & Gangsta Boo)	Drumma Boy	7:16
2.	"Welcome" (Young Dolph featuring Zed Zilla & Playa Fly)	Drumma Boy	3:51
3.	"My City Is the Realest" (Drumma Boy featuring DJ Paul)	Drumma Boy	3:01
4.	"Where I Come From" (Drumma Boy featuring Junior Reid)	Mars	3:52
5.	"M.E.M.P.H.I.S." (Frayser Boy featuring Gangsta Boo & La Chat)	Drumma Boy	3:56
6.	"Rollin'" (Drumma Boy featuring B-Hav & Gangsta Boo)	Drumma Boy	4:59
7.	"Dolla Signs" (Beanie Sigel featuring 8Ball & MJG)	Don Vito	5:31
8.	"My City on Lock" (Drumma Boy featuring Juicy J & Lil Peanut)	DJ Squeeky	4:15
9.	"Go Head Den" (P.B.Z. featuring Drumma Boy)	Drumma Boy	4:04
10.	"Dat Recipe" (Future featuring Drumma Boy & Young Dolph)	Peezy	4:15
11.	"TN Boyz" (Criminal Mane featuring Young Buck & Don Trip)	Drumma Boy	4:22
12.	"Drum Gang" (Drumma Boy featuring B-Hav, Degree, GK, Kristyle, Allie Baby & Gangsta Boo)	Degree	4:54
13.	"Hood on Smash" (Young Dolph featuring Criminal Mane & O.G. Boo Dirty)	Drumma Boy	4:07
14.	"My Block Major" (Bump featuring Yung Kee & Lionheart)	DJ Squeeky	4:09
15.	"Talk of da Town" (2Deep Feat. Devin Hill)	Drumma Boy	3:33
16.	"Know Your History" (Drumma Boy featuring 8 Ball & MJG)	Fate Eastwood	5:53
