= U Ain't Goin' Nowhere =

Single by Young Buck featuring LaToiya Williams

from the album Buck the World
- Released: May 18, 2007
- Recorded: 2006–2007
- Genre: Hip hop
- Length: 3:58
- Label: G-Unit; Interscope
- Songwriters: David Brown; Michael Flowers; Andre Young; V. Morgan
- Producers: Dr. Dre; Mark Batson

Young Buck singles chronology
| "Get Buck" (2007) | "U Ain't Goin' Nowhere" (2007) |

"U Ain't Goin' Nowhere" was the third single from Young Buck's second album, Buck the World. It features contemporary R&B singer LaToiya Williams and was produced by Dr. Dre and Mark Batson.

== Music video ==
In the music video, the song is cut off about halfway through the video and goes to his other song, "Buck the World", which features Lyfe Jennings.. The video was directed by Gil Green (director). The music video was unique as it was filmed in Havana Cuba. The filming in Cuba was made possible after Interscope Records and Gil Green received special authorization from The U.S. Department of the Treasury’s Office of Foreign Assets Control (OFAC).

== Charts ==
| Chart (2007) | Peak position |
|---|---|
| US Hot R&B/Hip-Hop Songs (Billboard) | 57 |

== Personnel ==
- Young Buck: vocals
- LaToiya Williams: vocals
- Mark Batson: keyboard
- Dawaun Parker: keyboard
- Mike Elizondo: guitar
- Mixed and produced by Dr. Dre
