= Lavida (EP) =

EP by D'Prince
- Released: May 3, 2019
- Genre: Afrobeat; Afropop; R&B; Highlife
- Length: 9:45
- Label: Mavin
- Producer: Altims; Baby Fresh

D'Prince chronology
Frenzy! (2012)	Lavida (2019)

Lavida is the first extended play by Nigerian singer, and songwriter D'Prince released on 3 May 2019, through Mavin Records. The EP blends various genres, including afrobeat, afropop, r&b, and highlife. Lyrically, it explores themes of desire, sex, and love.

== Background and release ==
Following the success of his debut studio album Frenzy!, D'Prince announced his record label Jonzing World, and released Lavida unannounced, a three-track extended play through Mavin Records, featuring Don Jazzy and Rema. The release was accompanied by a music video for "Lavida", produced by Capital Dream Pictures.

== Composition ==
The extended play contains tracks produced by Altims and Baby Fresh.

The opening track "Lavida", produced by Altims, is a smooth blend of R&B and Afrobeat. The second track, "My Place", Baby Fresh attempts to merge Afro-folk and Hi-life elements. The closing track, "True Love", is an Afrobeat fusion track produced by Baby Fresh, with D’Prince exploring themes of genuine affection. The song's blend of '90s pop drums, guitar solos, and rap elements culminates in a memorable outro, offering a satisfying conclusion to the EP.

== Critical reception ==
Professional ratings
Review scores
Source	Rating
Pulse Nigeria	5/10

In a review for Pulse Nigeria, Motolani Alake noted that “What is worth doing should be done well. You can’t help but feel something is missing.” Moreover, Alake added: “As things stand now, we are left with more questions than total satisfaction. That said, the only saving grace this project has is the 90’s pop moment with the guitar solo and D’Prince's fresh air of rap at the end of ‘True Love.’” In his closing remark, Alake said: “It's by no means bad, but something is missing.”

== Track listing ==
Lavida track listing
No.	Title	Writer(s)	Producer(s)	Length
1.	"Lavida" (with Rema)	Charles Enebeli; Divine Ikubor	Altims	3:32
2.	"My Place" (with Don Jazzy)	Charles; Michael Collins Ajereh	Baby Fresh	3:26
3.	"True Love"	Charles	Baby Fresh	2:47
Total length:				9:45
