= Da Game Owe Me =

Studio album by Playa Fly
- Released: November 16, 1999
- Recorded: 1998
- Genre: Memphis rap, Southern rap, underground rap
- Length: 1:07:59
- Label: Super Sigg Records
- Producer: Van Sigger

Playa Fly chronology
Just Gettin' It On (1999)	Da Game Owe Me (1999)	Fly2K (2002)

Da Game Owe Me is the 1999 album by Playa Fly and the final album of his to be released on Super Sigg Records.

== Track listing ==
1. "Intro" – 2:52
2. "Get Me Out" – 4:23
3. "M^{3} II" – 4:42
4. "Ghetto Eyes" – 4:53
5. "Talkin' Cash" (Featuring Thaistik) – 6:02
6. "Damn What Another Say" – 5:36
7. "Breakin' Da Law" (Featuring Terror & Gangsta Blac) – 5:28
8. "Skit (Luv 2 Hate Me)" – 1:21
9. "Start Runnin'" – 4:45
10. "Get' Em" (Featuring Blackout & Terror) – 6:56
11. "Feel Me" – 5:14
12. "Send for Me" – 5:25
13. "N God We Trust" – 4:53
14. "As-Salaam Aliakum" – 5:21

== Personnel ==
- Blackout – Producer
- Gangsta Blac – Performer
- Mista I-B-N – Producer, Production Assistant
- Rusty – Engineer
- Brandon "Wundabred" Seavers – Graphic Design
- Van Siggers – Executive Producer
