= Cashville, South Carolina =

Unincorporated community in South Carolina, United States

Coordinates: 34°48′26″N 82°07′47″W

Cashville is an unincorporated community in Spartanburg County, in the U.S. state of South Carolina.

== History ==
Cashville once contained a sawmill and cotton gin. The Cashville post office closed in 1901.
