= I Know You Want Me (Young Buck song) =

American rapper single

Single by Young Buck featuring Jazze Pha

from the album Buck the World
- Released: September 26, 2006
- Recorded: 2006
- Genre: Dirty rap, Southern hip hop
- Length: 4:47
- Label: G-Unit/Interscope
- Songwriters: Young Buck, Jazze Pha, Curtis Williams
- Producer: Jazze Pha

Young Buck singles chronology
"Do It Myself" (2006)	"I Know You Want Me" (2006)	"Get Buck" (2007)

Jazze Pha singles chronology
"I Know You Want Me" (2006)

"I Know You Want Me" was the first single from Young Buck's second album, Buck the World. It was released in November 2006 and was produced by and features Jazze Pha.

== Music video ==
There were many cameos, including 50 Cent, Tony Yayo, M.O.P, Mobb Deep, Lloyd Banks, Brisco, Rick Ross, Yung Joc, P. Diddy, Jeezy, Ludacris, Spider Loc, LoLa Monroe and others.

== Charts ==
Chart (2007)	Peak position
US Hot R&B/Hip-Hop Songs (Billboard)	67
