= Get Buck =

Single by Young Buck

from the album Buck the World
- Released: February 13, 2007
- Recorded: 2006
- Genre: Gangsta rap; hardcore hip hop; Southern hip hop
- Length: 4:16
- Label: G-Unit; Interscope
- Songwriters: David Brown; Timothy Clayton; Jamal Jones; Zachary Wallace; Elvis Williams
- Producer: Polow da Don

Young Buck singles chronology
"I Know You Want Me" (2006)	"Get Buck" (2007)	"U Ain't Goin' Nowhere" (2007)

"Get Buck" is the second single off American rapper Young Buck's second album, Buck the World. It was released on February 13, 2007 through G-Unit Records. The track was produced by Polow da Don. It was the only track off the album to chart on the Billboard Hot 100, peaking at #87.

The beat for this song was used on Ludacris' "Politics As Usual".

A clip of the instrumental version of "Get Buck" was used in a 2017 Budweiser TV commercial.

== Music video ==
The music video features cameos by DJ Drama, Young Jeezy, E-40, Young Dro, Rich Boy, Gorilla Zoe, Jody Breeze, Ace Hood, Polow da Don, Young Noble & E.D.I. of Outlawz as well as fellow G-Unit Records members Lloyd Banks, Lil Scrappy, Tony Yayo, Young Hot Rod & Spider Loc.

== Charts ==
Chart (2007)	Peak position
US Billboard Hot 100	87
US Hot R&B/Hip-Hop Songs (Billboard)	43
US Pop 100 (Billboard)	94
US Hot Rap Songs (Billboard)	22

== Appearances in other media ==
- Tyler, the Creator sampled this song for his 2024 single "Sticky".
