= Tha City Paper =

American rapper

- Also known as: Young Paper
- Origin: Nashville, Tennessee, United States
- Genres: Hip hop
- Occupation: Rapper
- Years active: 2006–present
- Label: Ca$hville Records (2012–present)

Marcus Fitzgerald, known professionally as Tha City Paper, is American rapper and hip hop artist.

== Early life ==
The City Paper grew up on the north and west side of Nashville, Tennessee. While in high school, Tha City Paper enjoyed basketball before joining the hip-hop scene.

== Music career ==
=== Solo career ===
Around 1996–1997 while in high school, Paper was dating the cousin of a rapper named Pistol. He also knew Pistol's cousins, who were a part of a group called "PJN", which Pistol created. The City Paper began to frequently listen in on the group PJN recording sessions, which sparked his interest in rap. He later became a part of that group. Over time, he featured on plenty of Pistol's tracks, and gradually gained success. He has written several songs, including "City Paper (dope boy swagg)", and "Lil Bo Tuff" which were off his independent album Paper View. In 2011, he dropped a mixtape entitled DOPaminE which was hosted by DJ Scream.

=== Cashville Records ===
After Young Buck heard Tha City Paper's mixtape DOPaminE he was quick to sign him to Ca$hville Records in early 2012. In the summer of 2012, Buck and Paper worked together on a collaboration mixtape entitled G.a.S - Gangsta and Street. This was the first project Paper released through Ca$hville Records.

== Discography ==
Studio albums

- 2014: Paper View 2

Independent albums

- 2008: Paper View

Official mixtapes

- 2010: Dis What Money Do (Hosted By: DJ Wheezy)
- 2011: DOPaminE (Hosted By: DJ Scream)
- 2014: Paper View In HD

Collaboration mixtapes

- 2012: G.a.S – Gangsta and Street (With: Young Buck)
- 2012: Welcome 2 Cashville (With: Ca$hville Records)
- 2013: G.a.S – Gangsta and Street 2 (With: Young Buck)
- TBD: G.a.S – Gangsta and Street 3 (With: Young Buck)

== Guest appearances ==
Year	Song	Artist(s)	Album
2006	"252 Grams" (featuring Young Paper)	Starlito	Prince Of The Ville
2006	"Whip Game" (featuring Young Paper)	Starlito	Prince Of The Ville
2010	"Certified Street" (featuring Young Paper)	Prolifik	No Nigga Season
2011	"I'm From Cashville" (featuring Tha City Paper)	D-Tay	Gone King Kong
2012	"#ForeverScoob" (R.I.P. DJ Scooby) (featuring Stix Izza, Young Buck, Tha City Paper, Quanie Cash & Robin Raynelle)	Starlito	—N/a
2012	"Buy It All" (featuring Tha City Paper)	Bezzeled Gang	Tha Musik City Miracle
2012	"Go Loco" (featuring Tha City Paper)	Young Buck	Live Loyal Die Rich
2012	"Tyler Perry" (featuring Tha City Paper)	J-Gutta	Duffy Gang
2012	"Throwd Off" (featuring Tha City Paper)	Young Buck	Strictly 4 Traps N Trunks 44: Free Young Buck Edition
2012	"The Reason" (featuring Tha City Paper)	Young Buck	Strictly 4 Traps N Trunks 44: Free Young Buck Edition
2012	"Pussy Bill" (featuring Tha City Paper)	Young Buck	Strictly 4 Traps N Trunks 44: Free Young Buck Edition
2012	"House Shoes" (featuring Young Buck & Tha City Paper)	B-Do	—N/a
2012	"The Storm" (featuring Tha City Paper & Ms. Trice)	Ahren-B	Ahren-B EP
2012	"Leanin' On Dat Leather" (featuring Tha City Paper)	Goatalini	Actin' Brand New
2013	"Turnt Up" (featuring Tha City Paper & Rukus 100)	Paperchase	The Next Big Thang Pt.2
2013	"Get Sum'n" (featuring Starlito & Tha City Paper)	L Roy Da Boy	—N/a
2013	"Turnt Up" (featuring Tha City Paper)	Q. Marley	Success Over Night

== Awards and nominations ==
Year	Nominee / work	Award	Result
2008	Young Paper	Southern Entertainment Awards – Performance Of The Year	Nominated
2009	Young Paper	Southern Entertainment Awards – Best Indie Rap Artist Of The Year	Nominated
2009	Young Paper	Southern Entertainment Awards – Slept On Artist Of The Year	Won
2009	Paper View	Southern Entertainment Awards – Indie Album Of The Year	Nominated
2009	Paper View	Southern Entertainment Awards – Best Indie Album Of The Year	Nominated
2011	Tha City Paper	Southern Entertainment Awards – Indie Rap Artist Of The Year	Nominated
2011	Dope Boy Swag (Produced by: Broadway)	Southern Entertainment Awards – Beat Of The Year	Nominated
2011	Dope Boy Swag (Produced by: Broadway)	Southern Entertainment Awards – Song Of The Year	Nominated
