= Cashville Takeover =

Mixtape by Ca$hville Records
- Released: February 3, 2009
- Genre: Hip-hop
- Label: Ca$hville Records

Ca$hville Records chronology
Cashville Takeover (2009)	Welcome 2 Cashville (2012)

Cashville Takeover is a mixtape by rappers Young Buck, C-Bo, The Outlawz, and $o$a Da Plug, hosted by DJ Rip. This was the first mixtape released with all of the Ca$hville Records roster on one disc together. The mixtape features exclusive tracks and freestyles from Ca$hville with appearances by Snoop Dogg, All Star Cashville Prince, Yo Gotti, and more. It was released for digital download and sale on iTunes on February 3, 2009.

== Track listing ==
No.	Title	Performed By:	Length
1.	"Cashville Takeover" (Intro)	DJ Rip	1:51
2.	"Money on My Mind" (featuring All Star Cashville Prince, The Outlawz & $o$a Da Plug)	Young Buck	4:42
3.	"My Interview"	Young Buck	4:07
4.	"Cashville Drop"	DJ Rip	0:29
5.	"Fucks with Me" (featuring The Outlawz & $o$a Da Plug)	Young Buck	3:21
6.	"It’s Not Ok" (50 Cent Diss)	Young Buck	3:46
7.	"Hot 97 Interview"	50 Cent	1:28
8.	"Only Life I Know"	The Outlawz	3:45
9.	"Dopeman Bitch" (featuring All Star, $o$a Da Plug & 615)	Young Buck	3:17
10.	"Money Rite" (featuring All Star & $o$a Da Plug)	Young Buck	4:32
11.	"Cashville Drop"	DJ Rip	0:29
12.	"Driving Down the Freeway (G-Mix)" (featuring The Outlawz, Snoop Dogg & Stormey)	Young Buck	5:44
13.	"HBI Fuckin Exclusive Drop"	DJ Rip	0:32
14.	"We Outta Here" (featuring The Outlawz & $o$a Da Plug)	Young Buck	4:56
15.	"Lookin for Some Hoes" (featuring $o$a Da Plug)	Young Buck	4:25
16.	"Real Niggaz" (featuring Stormey)	The Outlawz	5:04
17.	"Jays on My Feet"	C-Bo	3:59
18.	"Cashville Drop"	DJ Rip	0:29
19.	"Kill Me a Nigga"	Young Buck	3:56
20.	"Real as It Gets" (featuring Stormey)	The Outlawz	4:18
21.	"Re-Up" (featuring $o$a Da Plug)	Young Buck	3:19
22.	"Godz Plan" (featuring The Outlawz)	Young Buck	2:55
23.	"Cashville Drop"	DJ Rip	0:29
24.	"Grind Head" (featuring Yo Gotti & Young Buck)	All Star	5:02
25.	"Sirius Radio Interview"	Young Buck	18:01
26.	"We Want It" (featuring Stormey)	The Outlawz	4:20
27.	"Cashville Takeover" (Outro)	DJ Rip	1:51
