= Buck the World =

Studio album by Young Buck
- Released: March 27, 2007
- Recorded: 2006–2007
- Studios: The Blue Room (Nashville, TN); Sony Music Studios (New York, NY); Sony BMG Studios; Quad Studios (Nashville, TN); Doppler Studios (Atlanta, GA); Legacy Recording Studios (New York, NY); Record One (Los Angeles, CA); SoundTrap Studios (Atlanta, GA); Avex Honolulu Studios (Honolulu, HI); S-Line Studios (Atlanta, GA); Chalice Recording Studios (Los Angeles, CA); Integrated Studios (New York, NY); PatchWerk Recording Studios (Atlanta, GA); 54 Sound (Ferndale, MI); Marshall's House
- Genres: Southern hip hop; gangsta rap; hardcore hip hop; crunk
- Length: 73:45
- Labels: G-Unit; Interscope
- Producers: Ced Keyz; DJ Toomp; Doc McKinney; Dr. Dre; Eminem; Gramps; Hi-Tek; Jake One; Jazze Pha; Jiggolo; J.U.S.T.I.C.E. League; Lil' Jon; Mark Batson; Polow da Don; Tha Bizness; Vitamin D; Young RJ; Key Kat

Young Buck chronology
| T.I.P. (2005) | Buck the World (2007) | They Don't Bother Me (2007) |

Alternative cover

Singles from Buck the World
- 1. "I Know You Want Me" Released: July 23, 2006; 2. "Get Buck" Released: February 13, 2007; 3. "U Ain't Goin' Nowhere" Released: May 18, 2007

Buck the World is the fourth solo studio album by American rapper Young Buck. It was released on March 27, 2007, through G-Unit Records and Interscope Records, marking it his second and final major label solo full-length. The album's title is a play on the expression, "Fuck the world".

Recording sessions took place at The Blue Room and Quad Studios in Nashville, Sony Music Studios, Legacy Recording Studios and Integrated Studios in New York, Doppler Studios, SoundTrap Studios, S-Line Studios and PatchWerk Recording Studios in Atlanta, Record One and Chalice Recording Studios in Los Angeles, Avex Honolulu Studios in Hawaii, 54 Sound in Ferndale, Sony BMG Studios and Marshall's House.

Production was handled by Dr. Dre, Jake One, Jazze Pha, Ced Keyz, DJ Toomp, Doc McKinney, Eminem, Gramps, Hi-Tek, Jiggolo, J.U.S.T.I.C.E. League, Lil' Jon, Mark Batson, Polow da Don, Tha Bizness, Vitamin D, Young RJ and Key Kat, with co-producers Che Vicious and Craig Lane, additional producer G Koop, and 50 Cent and Sha Money XL serving as executive producer.

It features guest appearances from Jeezy, 50 Cent, 8Ball & MJG, Bun B, Dion Jenkins, Jazze Pha, Kokane, Ky-Mani Marley, LaToiya Williams, Lyfe Jennings, Pimp C, Snoop Dogg, T.I., Trick Daddy and Chester Bennington.

== Singles ==
The album was supported with three singles with accompanying music videos: "I Know You Want Me", "Get Buck" and "U Ain't Goin' Nowhere".

Its lead single, "I Know You Want Me", made it to number 67 on the Hot R&B/Hip-Hop Songs chart in the United States.

The second single off of the album, "Get Buck", was a minor success, reaching number 87 on the US Billboard Hot 100 and number 43 on the Hot R&B/Hip-Hop Songs in the US.

The album's third single, "U Ain't Goin' Nowhere", peaked at number 57 on the Hot R&B/Hip-Hop Songs. Gil Green filmed music video in Cuba after Interscope Records and Gil Green received special authorization from the United States Department of the Treasury's Office of Foreign Assets Control.

The song "Push Em Back" was featured in 2008 comedy film Drillbit Taylor during the first day of school scene.

== Critical reception ==
Professional ratings
Aggregate scores
| Source | Rating |
|---|---|
| Metacritic | 70/100 |
Review scores
| Source | Rating |
| AllHipHop | 3.5/5 stars |
| AllMusic | 4/5 stars |
| Entertainment Weekly | B+ |
| HipHopDX | 3.5/5 |
| Pitchfork | 6.1/10 |
| RapReviews | 7.5/10 |
| Rolling Stone | 3.5/5 stars |
| Spin | 3.5/5 stars |
| Stylus | B− |
| XXL | XL (4/5) |

Buck the World was met with generally favourable reviews from music critics. At Metacritic, which assigns a normalized rating out of 100 to reviews from mainstream publications, the album received an average score of 70, based on fourteen reviews.

Simon Vozick-Levinson of Entertainment Weekly praised the album, calling it "G-Unit's strongest LP in recent memory". AllMusic's David Jeffries described it as "a well-built and surprisingly diverse album", and Steve 'Flash' Juon of RapReviews called it "a fun, rambunctious, guilty pleasure of an album".

Christian Hoard of Rolling Stone found "Buck spits grimy, chest-thumping boasts with ear-grabbing command". Alvin Blanco of Spin noted: "despite fairly rote lyrics, Buck's ferocious flow can turn even the most cliched hood yarn into a fire-and-brimstone sermon". Jayson Greene of Stylus Magazine wrote: "like his first record Straight Outta Cashville, Buck the World is a solid-to-great Southern rap genre exercise, graced with immaculate production and boasting an all-star supporting cast". Pitchfork reviewer saw "the problem with Buck the World is that it's largely inconsistent. There are 15 producers over 17 tracks. Sometimes it clicks, but other times it feels forced".

In mixed reviews, Tim Perlich of Now admits "the bigger problem, though, is Young Buck's yawn-inducing rhyme flow, which, paired with relentlessly slow, chugging beats, creates pure aural Sominex".

== Commercial performance ==
In the United States, the album debuted at number 3 on the Billboard 200 and atop both the Top R&B/Hip-Hop Albums and the Top Rap Albums, with 140,000 copies sold in its first week. It also debuted at number 7 on the Canadian Albums Chart.

In the United Kingdom, the album reached number 94 on the UK Albums Chart, number 99 on the Scottish Albums Chart and number 6 on the Hip Hop and R&B Albums Chart.

The album also made it to number 87 on the Swiss Hitparade and number 131 on the SNEP.

== Track listing ==
| No. | Title | Writer(s) | Producer(s) | Length |
|---|---|---|---|---|
| 1. | "Push Em Back" | David Brown; Ralph J. Rice II | Young RJ; Craig Lane (co.) | 3:55 |
| 2. | "Say It to My Face" (featuring 8Ball, MJG and Bun B) | Brown; Premro Smith; Marlon Goodwin; Bernard Freeman; Amir Perry | Jiggolo | 3:40 |
| 3. | "Buss Yo' Head" | Brown; Erik Ortiz; Kevin Crowe; Michael Masser | J.U.S.T.I.C.E. League | 4:58 |
| 4. | "I Ain't Fucking Wit U!" (featuring Snoop Dogg, Trick Daddy and Dion) | Brown; Calvin Broadus; Maurice Young; Dion Jenkins; Tony Cottrell | Hi-Tek | 3:52 |
| 5. | "Get Buck" | Brown; Jamal Jones; Tim Clayton | Polow da Don | 4:14 |
| 6. | "Buck the World" (featuring Lyfe Jennings) | Brown; Chester Jennings; Jacob Dutton; Ronald Millender | Jake One | 3:46 |
| 7. | "Slow Ya Roll" (featuring Chester Bennington) | Brown; Martin McKinney; Raimundo Sátiro de Mello | Doc McKinney; Gramps | 3:43 |
| 8. | "Hold On" (featuring 50 Cent) | Brown; Curtis Jackson; Andre Young; Clyde Otis; Herman Kelly | Dr. Dre; Che Vicious (co.) | 3:59 |
| 9. | "Pocket Full of Paper" (featuring Young Jeezy) | Brown; Jay Jenkins; Aldrin Davis; Ian Lewis | DJ Toomp | 3:45 |
| 10. | "Haters" (featuring Kokane) | Brown; Jerry B. Long Jr.; Derrick Brown | Vitamin D | 4:10 |
| 11. | "U Ain't Goin' Nowhere" (featuring LaToiya Williams) | Brown; Young; Michael Flowers; V. Morgan | Dr. Dre; Mark Batson | 3:59 |
| 12. | "Money Good" | Brown; Jonathan Smith; Craig Love; LaMarquis Jefferson; Larry Nix | Lil' Jon | 4:11 |
| 13. | "Puff Puff Pass" (featuring Ky-Mani Marley) | Brown; Ky-Mani Marley; Justin Henderson | Tha Bizness | 4:40 |
| 14. | "Clean Up Man" | Brown; Dutton; Robert Mandell | Jake One; G Koop (add.) | 4:22 |
| 15. | "4 Kings" (featuring T.I., Young Jeezy and Pimp C) | Brown; Clifford Harris; Jenkins; Chad Butler; Phalon Alexander; Michael Barnett; Will Barnett; George Clinton | Jazze Pha | 4:52 |
| 16. | "I Know You Want Me" (featuring Jazze Pha) | Brown; Alexander; Cedric Williams | Jazze Pha; Ced Keyz International | 4:45 |
| 17. | "Lose My Mind" | Brown; Marshall Mathers; Luis Resto | Eminem | 6:54 |
| 18. | "Funeral Music" (performed by 50 Cent) | Jackson; K. Harrold | Key Kat |
| Total length: | | | | 1:13:45 |

Notes

- Track 17 contains a hidden track "Funeral Music" performed solely by 50 Cent. iTunes version of the album omitted "Lose My Mind" leaving "Funeral Music" only 3:15 in length.

Sample credits

- Track 3 contains replayed elements from "My Hero Is a Gun" by Michael Masser.
- Track 6 contains elements from "Everybody's Got a Good Thing" by Ronald Millender as performed by Lorlli.
- Track 9 contains resung elements from "Bad Boys" by Ian Lewis.
- Track 15 contains replayed elements from "Havin Thangs" by Michael Barnett, Chad Butler, Will Barnett and George Clinton.

Leftover songs

- "Do It Myself"
- "Dead or Alive"
- "Sellin' Everything" (featuring B.G.)
- "Gone in the Morning" (featuring Trey Songz)

== Charts ==
=== Weekly charts ===
| Chart (2007) | Peak position |
|---|---|
| Canadian Albums (Billboard) | 7 |
| French Albums (SNEP) | 131 |
| Scottish Albums (Official Charts) | 99 |
| Swiss Albums (Schweizer Hitparade) | 87 |
| UK Albums (Official Charts) | 94 |
| UK R&B Albums (Official Charts) | 6 |
| US Billboard 200 | 3 |
| US Top R&B/Hip-Hop Albums (Billboard) | 1 |
| US Top Rap Albums (Billboard) | 1 |

=== Year-end charts ===
| Chart (2007) | Position |
|---|---|
| US Billboard 200 | 142 |
| US Top R&B/Hip-Hop Albums (Billboard) | 38 |
