= Drumma Boy =

American producer and rapper (born 1983)

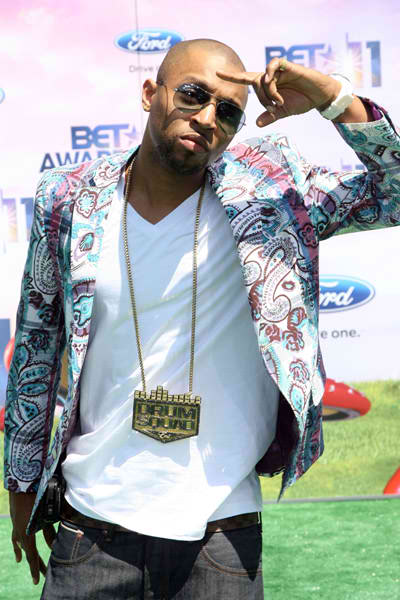
- Gholson at the 2011 BET Awards in Los Angeles

Background information
- Also known as: D-Boy Fresh
- Born: Christopher James Gholson; August 11, 1983 (age 43); Memphis, Tennessee, U.S.
- Genres: Southern hip hop; R&B; trap
- Occupations: Record producer; rapper; songwriter
- Instruments: Roland TR-808; Pro Tools; Logic Pro; Akai MPC-4000; Apple GarageBand; Korg Triton; Propellerhead Reason; clarinet; piano; sampler; vocals
- Years active: 2002–present
- Label: Drum Squad Productions

Christopher James Gholson (born August 11, 1983), better known by his stage name Drumma Boy (or Drummer Boy), is an American record producer and rapper.

== Early life ==
Gholson was born in Memphis, Tennessee, and raised in Cordova. He was exposed to music at a young age. His mother, Billie Baker Gholson, worked as an accountant and performed part-time as an opera singer. She was the first African-American to graduate from Rudi E. Scheidt School of Music at the University of Memphis. His father, G. James Gholson, a retired clarinetist and music professor at Rudi E. Scheidt School of Music, was the first African-American male to hold the first chair position in the Memphis Symphony Orchestra. His father is an emeritus of the Memphis Woodwind Quintet and a soloist in the United States Navy Band. His paternal grandfather was a high school principal and has a high school named after him in Washington, D.C. The rest of his extended family including grandmothers and aunts were also musicians and taught music in the schools. Drumma Boy says he had a recorder in his hand at age 3 and a clarinet at age 5. His father was instrumental in teaching him about traditional classical music yet it was his mother that introduced him to Curtis Mayfield and 1970s rhythm and blues. A classical musically trained musician, Gholson began the practicing E-flat clarinet at age six and then went to the B-flat clarinet. At the age of six, Gholson began taking piano lessons.

Mathematics was his favorite school subject. In 9th grade, he made a song about the quadratic formula for extra credit and received the top grade for the class. Gholson started making hip hop beats at the age of 12 and scored his first production placement on local radio with Memphis rapper Tela's "Double Dose". He produced an entire album at age 14. During high school, Gholson played basketball and was offered several athletic scholarships. He was offered a position in the Memphis Youth Symphony Orchestra as well as being offered college music scholarships. As an amateur producer during his high school days, he began charging $200 for each beat that he made and eventually earned $500 per track by the time he graduated from high school.

Gholson attended the University of Memphis as a Music Business major, matriculating in 2001. Due to the pressure from his parents to achieve academically, his father advised him that a college degree would open more doors for career advancement, and his mother stressed the importance of financial savvy. Gholson also attended college to satisfy his father's belief that a college degree was a ticket to a solid and stable career. Following his father's advice and by his junior year, Drumma Boy established a name for himself and was quickly becoming the most sought-after producers in Tennessee. He spent much of his spare time outside of classes on the keyboard and drum machine making hip hop beats in his room. In between attending classes, he would shop his homemade beats to local Memphis rappers such as Gangsta Boo, as well as travel to Texas to work on musical projects for Scarface and Bun B of UGK. Though Gholson earned good grades, he was expelled from school in 2004 due to lack of attendance. The cash flow from his music production company was so strong that Gholson pulled $20,000 per month where he eventually realized that he had no reason to stay in college. His father challenged him, in an effort to convince him to return to college, to earn $100,000 within 12 months to prove his independence. Drumma Boy earned $100,000 within 10 months. Though Gholson never returned to the University of Memphis, he and his father established the James and Christopher Gholson Scholarship Fund, a scholarship that goes towards undergraduate and graduate students studying music at the school, furthering his father and his family's commitment and values towards education and cultural literacy.

Within two years of leaving his native city, Drumma Boy had fostered relationships with a number of hip hop groups and rappers such as Outkast, Trick Daddy, Slim Thug, DJ Cash Money, Pastor Troy, and Killer Mike.

In October 2013, Drumma Boy conducted a halftime show during the 2013–2014 season opening of his hometown NBA team, the Memphis Grizzlies.

== Career ==
Gholson has worked with an array of acts from hip hop, R&B, and reggae. Gholson relocated to Atlanta in 2004 and set his sights to become a professional music producer and entrepreneur. Citing his sense of business acumen from his mother, a professional accountant, Gholson founded Drum Squad, an independent umbrella entertainment company that encompasses Drum Squad Productions, a music production company that represents producers and songwriters, Drum Squad Records (a record label), and Drum Squad Films, a film production and distribution company.

By 2008, Gholson became one of the most sought after hip hop producers in the music industry. In 2008, Vibe Magazine named him one of the Top 5 Producers "making noise" in the music industry. In December 2009, he was named by The New York Times one of the 4 hottest producers "driving the city" in Atlanta, describing his sound as "a busy bee swarm of synths overlaid with brash bass injections that's equal parts Memphis and Atlanta". He was quoted in the January 2010 issue of Rolling Stone surrounding his production work for controversial recording artist Gucci Mane's #1 rap album The State vs. Radric Davis.

In January 2009, Gholson starred alongside Jazze Pha and Vawn in BET's reality series Welcome to Dreamland. He appeared on a segment of Bravo'sThe Real Housewives of Atlanta while making beats for cast member Kandi Burruss as well as appearing in the studio during an episode of Monica's BET reality series Still Standing. In November 2009, Drumma Boy released his music video "Dis Girl" shot by Mr. Boomtown, the first single off his mixtape Welcome II My City, which received millions of hits on Worldstarhiphop. He has appeared on Good Day Atlanta, Good Morning Memphis, CBS News Channel 9, BET and MTV.

Gholson also scores for television and film, most recently working on FOX's hit TV show Empire with Bryshere Gray (Yazz). In December 2013, Drumma Boy was commissioned to create film scores for the independent film Blood First for NaRa Films and O.Y.'s Spotlite Entertainment. He created film scores for movies Chapters and Holla 2.

== Other ventures ==
In 2013, Gholson released his own line of luxury wine called Moreno BHLV. Gholson has also opened "G Factory"; a 20,000 square foot creative studio in his hometown Memphis, for film and TV show production that will eventually encompass a wood shop, and car detail crew where the space will be designated strictly for creative professionals, artists and painters to hone their talents. Gholson also launched a film production and distribution division called Drum Squad Films subsidiary within his company, Drum Squad. One of the first few independent films called "Chapters" was launched through Drum Squad films in 2012, of which Gholson did additional film scoring for. "Know your History" was another independent film released by Drum Squad films documenting on history of the city of Memphis.

Gholson is part of Tracklib's Creators Advisory Board.

Gholson was a featured guest at The Heart of God Foundation's "City of Atlanta Neighborhood Revitalization Ball, an organization dedicated to raising funds to provide for the city's homeless.

Along with his father, Gholson annually bestows a scholarship at the Rudi E. Scheidt School of Music that benefits either clarinet or music business students.

== Production equipment and style ==
Gholson uses a variety of production equipment to compose hip hop drum beats for hip hop songs. He primarily uses an Akai MPC 4000, Pro Tools, Logic Pro, Roland TR-808 and electronic keyboards manufactured by Roland, Korg and Yamaha. Gholsons's signature drop on his beats is a voice saying "listen to this track, bitch". He is also known for the origination of extending sounds at the end of a verse and his use of a rise effect before the beginning and end of every verse and hook. He also utilizes his ad-lib of "Yeah Boy" and a young reverbed female voice saying "Drumma Boy" before the beginning of a song.

Gholson cites hip hop and R&B musicians Dr. Dre, Quincy Jones, Raphael Saadiq and The Funk Brothers as his signature music production inspirations with other musical influences ranging from European classical composers Ludwig van Beethoven, Jean Sibelius, Wolfgang Amadeus Mozart, and Johann Sebastian Bach to American jazz icons Dizzy Gillespie and Miles Davis all the way to hip hop group Three 6 Mafia and Houston rapper, Scarface. He is known for combining classical music chords with urban hip hop street sounds, and for his adherence to the Atlanta trap music subgenre. His production techniques bring together a diverse array of genres that originate in hip hop, rock, pop, classical, soul, and R&B.

== Awards ==
Drumma Boy won "Best Indie Producer of the Year" consecutively at the 2009, 2010 and 2011 Southern Entertainment Awards. He received a nomination for "Producer of the Year" at the 2008 Ozone Awards and at the 2010 BET Hip Hop Awards. His beats assisted with two nominations during the 2009 Grammy Awards including his work on T.I.'s Paper Trail (Best Rap Album) and "Put On" by Young Jeezy & Kanye West (Best Performance by a Rap Duo.). Drumma also produced "Stranger" off Usher's 2010 Versus (EP), released in conjunction with the deluxe edition of Raymond v. Raymond; the album won two Grammy Awards for Best Contemporary R&B Album and Best Male R&B Vocal Performance. In 2011, Drumma's hit single "No Hands" for Waka Flocka, Roscoe Dash and Wale received a nomination for "Best Collaboration" at the 2011 BET Awards and picked up the accolade for "Best Club Banger" at the 2011 BET Hip Hop Awards.

== Discography ==
Studio albums

- 2009: Welcome II My City (Drum Squad Records)
- 2011: The Birth of D-Boy Fresh (Drum Squad Records)
- 2012: Welcome to My City 2 (Drum Squad Records)
- 2014: Welcome to My City 3 (Drum Squad Records)
- 2019: My Brother's Keeper (Drum Squad Records)
- 2022: Welcome to My City 4 (Drum Squad Records)

Collaborative albums

- 2021: Certified Youngin' (with Bighomie Kdogg) (Drum Squad Records)

Extended plays

- 2023: Christmas Spit It Instrumentals (Instrumental album) (Drum Squad Records)

Mixtapes

- 2013: Clash of the Titans (with DJ Paul) (Hosted by: DJ Scream) (Drum Squad Records)
- 2017: Who Shot Cupid (with Scotty ATL) (Hosted by: DJ Scream) (Cool Club, Drum Squad Records)

Hosted mixtapes

- 2010: Drumma Boy - 2010 All-Star Playlist
- 2010: Young Buck - Back on My Buck Shit Vol. 2: Change of Plans
- 2012: Young Buck - Live Loyal Die Rich (Hosted with: DJ Crisis)
- 2012: 8 Ball - Premro
- 2012: 4th of July Playlist
- 2012: Drumma Boy's 2k12 Halloween Playlist
- 2013: Drumma Boy's 2k13 Spring Bling Playlist
- 2013: Drumma Boy's 2k13 4th of July Playlist
- 2014: Drumma Boy's 2k14 All-Star Weekend Playlist
- 2021: Young Buck - Back on My Buck Shit, Vol. 3

== Filmography ==
Film
Year	Film	Role	Notes
2013	Buck Mentality	Himself	Video Documentary
