= Cashville Records =

American hip hop record label

- Founded: 2005
- Founder: Young Buck
- Distributors: RED Distribution, Universal Records
- Genre: Hip hop, Southern hip hop, gangsta rap
- Country of origin: U.S.
- Location: Nashville, Tennessee
- Official website: myspace.com/cashvillerecords1

Cashville Records (formerly G-Unit South) is an American independent record label based in Nashville, Tennessee, founded by rapper Young Buck. Initially founded as a southern branch of 50 Cent's G-Unit Records, the label became "Cashville Records" in late 2007 after a dispute between 50 Cent and Young Buck led to Buck being banned from using the G-Unit logo or name to distribute his music. The label has signed such acts as The Outlawz, C-Bo, Lil Scrappy, D4L and more.

== History ==
In 2008, The Outlawz were the latest addition to Cashville Records, joining veteran rapper C-Bo, who became a part of the label's roster in January.

In late 2011, it was rumoured that Lil' Kim was signing with the label. She would later confirm this in an interview stating that "If y'all don’t know, this my boy right here. G-Unit South, that’s where it’s at... And I’m family too, down with the G-Unit camp. We got surprises for y'all." she said in an interview with Rap-Up.com. As of 2012, nothing had happened.

Rapper Mystikal also confirms that he himself almost signed to the label in 2012 after he revealed that he got many offers while in prison, including a very attractive deal from Cashville Records. However, he later signed with YMCMB.

In 2012, West coast veteran rapper, C-Bo, released his first album on the label and plans on releasing his second album Orca in 2012 as well.

After Young Buck heard Tha City Paper's mixtape DOPaminE he was quick to sign him to Cashville Records in early 2012. In Summer 2012, both Buck and Paper linked up for a Collaboration mixtape entitled G.a.S - Gangsta and Street, this was the first project Paper released through Cashville Records since he signed to the label.

Newly signed artist Rukus 100 released his first project on the label in early 2013, the project was an Official Mixtape called "Smokin' Out The Pound" soon after a DVD was released also named "Smokin' Out The Pound". These projects were released to help promote Rukus upcoming debut album on Cashville Records Money Hungry.

== Artists ==
=== Current acts ===
Act	Co-signed with	Year signed	Albums under the label
Young Buck		Founder	2
Lil Murda	Strong Mind Entertainment	2005	
Hi-C	Strong Mind Entertainment	2005	
615		2006	1
C-Bo	West Coast Mafia Records	2007	3
The Outlawz	1Nation Entertainment	2008	1
Young Noble	1Nation Entertainment	2008	
E.D.I. Mean	1Nation Entertainment	2008	1
Kastro	1Nation Entertainment	2008	
Sosa Tha Plug	Shark Entertainment	2009	
Shannon Sanders		2010	
Charlie P	BlackFly Music	2011	
Rukus 100	Pound Pusha Productions	2012	
Tha City Paper		2012	1
Paperchase		2012	
Big O		2013	
Generation X		2013	
Oskie		2018	
2GunNut		2018	
Kamp Kens		2018	
Tray 8		2018	
Goldie		2018	

=== Former acts ===
Fluid Outrage	2010–11

=== In-house producers ===
- Broadway
- Young Buck
- Celsizzle
- Fate Eastwood
- Coop
- Heartbeatz
- G.O.T.H.A.M. City
- BandPlay
