= Lab Ox =

American record producer from Houston, Texas

- Also known as: Lab Ox, Ox
- Born: Darren Billy, Jr. January 23, 1985 (age 41)
- Origin: New Orleans, Louisiana
- Genres: Hip-hop, pop, pop rock, rhythm and blues, urban
- Occupations: Record producer, songwriter, vocal producer
- Instruments: keyboards; FL Studio; guitar; trumpet
- Years active: 2006 - present
- Label: Lab Ox Music Publishing

Darren Billy, Jr., professionally known as Lab Ox, is a Grammy award-winning American hip-hop, R&B, pop rock, R&B, urban and pop producer from Houston, Texas. He has produced and written songs for artists and groups including Gary Clark Jr., Rihanna, Willow Smith, James Fauntleroy, Nicki Minaj, 50 Cent, Lloyd Banks, G-Unit, Drake, and Yolanda Adams. He was the first producer signed to Jay-Z's record label Roc Nation upon the labels launch in 2009, and remained active on the label until his departure in early 2016.

== Early career ==
Lab Ox got his start in the record industry with 50 Cent as a producer on former G-Unit artist Hot Rod's demo project. On August 17, 2007, he produced a record which 50 Cent released, aimed at Lil Wayne, entitled Part Time Lover. The record would later be featured on the mix-tape Sabrina's Baby Boy, the last in the "G-Unit Radio" mix-tape.

== Production and songwriting credits ==
=== 2007 - present ===
Date	Artist	Song	Album	Label	Role
2012	Willow Smith	"Fireball" (featuring Nicki Minaj)	Knees and Elbows	StarRoc/Roc Nation	Songwriter,
2011	Yolanda Adams	"Just When"	Becoming	N House Music Group	Producer
2011	Yolanda Adams	"Not Giving Up"	Becoming	N House Music Group	Producer
2010	Lloyd Banks	"Kill It" (feat. Governor)	The Hunger for More 2	G-Unit Records/EMI	Producer
2009	50 Cent	"Then Days Went By"	Before I Self Destruct	Interscope Records	Producer
2009	50 Cent	"Rider 4 Real" feat. Lloyd Banks, Tony Yayo	50 Cent: Blood on the Sand	Swordfish Studios/THQ	Producer
2009	50 Cent	"Bout Dat" feat. Lloyd Banks, Tony Yayo	50 Cent: Blood on the Sand	Swordfish Studios/THQ	Producer
2009	50 Cent	"Watch Yo Back"	50 Cent: Blood on the Sand	Swordfish Studios/THQ	Producer
2009	50 Cent	"Puppy Love"	50 Cent: Blood on the Sand	Swordfish Studios/THQ	Producer
2009	50 Cent	"Don't Front"	50 Cent: Blood on the Sand	Swordfish Studios/THQ	Producer
2009	50 Cent	"50 Cent Freestyle"	50 Cent: Blood on the Sand	Swordfish Studios/THQ	Producer
2009	50 Cent	"Last Chance"	50 Cent: Blood on the Sand	Swordfish Studios/THQ	Producer
2009	50 Cent	"Southside Nigga" feat. Lloyd Banks, Tony Yayo	50 Cent: Blood on the Sand	Swordfish Studios/THQ	Producer
2009	50 Cent	"I Got Hoes"	50 Cent: Blood on the Sand	Swordfish Studios/THQ	Producer
2009	50 Cent	"Part Time Lover"	Sabrina's Baby Boy (G-Unit Radio Pt. 25)	G-Unit Records	Producer
2007	Drake	"When We Come Around" (feat. Nickelus F	No album	Independent	Producer
