= Here We Go Again (Governor song) =

Single by Governor featuring 50 Cent

from the album A Touch of Magic
- Released: December 27, 2010
- Recorded: 2010
- Genre: R&B; hip-hop
- Length: 3:37
- Label: G-Note; G-Unit
- Songwriters: Governor Washington; Curtis Jackson

Governor singles chronology
"Do You Think About Me" (2010)	"Here We Go Again" (2010)

50 Cent singles chronology
"No Dejemos Que se Apague" (2010)	"Here We Go Again" (2010)	"Buzzin'" (2011)

"Here We Go Again" is a song by American singer-songwriter Governor, released as the first single from his third album, A Touch of Magic. The song features vocals from American rapper 50 Cent, who at the time was the head of the label Governor was signed to. The song was released for digital download on Amazon on December 27, 2010 and iTunes on December 29, 2010. The song was released to radio in the last week of January 2011.

== Background ==
Since joining G-Unit Records in 2009 and releasing several mixtapes, Governor finally released his debut single from his upcoming album. The single was only the second single to be released under a subsidiary label of G-Unit Records, which is called G-Note Records. The song features New York City rap artist 50 Cent, who raps two verses on the song. First of all the song premiered on DJ Enough's show on Hot 97 and then the song was officially released to the public on 50 Cent's online website thisis50.com. The first official performance of the single took place at the Marquee club in Las Vegas, where 50 Cent unveiled his new headphones. In early February, 2011, Governor performed his single with 50 Cent on Lopez Tonight accompanied by George Lopez's in-house band Michael Bearden the Ese Vatos.

== Music video ==
A music video for the single was shot in February 2011, the video is about Governor and 50 Cent performing live with support from a band and is similar to the previous video with them in called, "Do You Think About Me". The video premiered on 50 Cent's official website thisis50.com. The video also features a shot of 50 Cent's new headphones, "Sleek By 50", and Governor listening to the song through them.

== Release information ==
=== Purchasable release ===
Country	Date	Format	Label	Ref
United States	December 27, 2010	Digital download	G-Note / G-Unit Records	
