= Do You Think About Me =

Single by 50 Cent

from the album Before I Self Destruct
- Released: January 16, 2010
- Recorded: 2009
- Genre: Hip-hop
- Length: 3:26
- Label: Aftermath; Shady; Interscope; Universal
- Songwriters: Curtis Jackson; Dana Stinson; Governor Washington
- Producer: Rockwilder

50 Cent singles chronology
| "Baby by Me" (2009) | "Do You Think About Me" (2010) | "Pass the Patron" (2010) |

"Do You Think About Me" is the second single by American rapper 50 Cent from his fourth studio album Before I Self Destruct. It was commercially released on January 16, 2010, and on March 22, 2010 in the United Kingdom. The song was produced by Rockwilder, and written by Curtis Jackson, Dana Stinson and Governor Washington. It features uncredited vocals from R&B singer Governor, who was then recently signed to both G-Unit Records and G-Note Records around the time.

== Music video ==
The music video was directed by Chris Robinson and shot in New York. Despite a widely publicized breakup in 2003, 50 Cent asked ex-girlfriend Vivica A. Fox to appear in the video describing a relationship gone wrong. The video also features actor Tamala Jones (Fox's co-star in Booty Call) and dancer Tahiry. The video opens with 50 sitting at his desk with a letter addressed to "Mr. Jackson". The next scene shows Fox as the girlfriend showing up at a restaurant to see 50 entertaining another woman (Jones), and she leaves incensed. 50 raps to the woman using explicit lyrics, to which she soon has enough and throws water in his face. Fox reminisces about the good times together, but decides to get revenge by slashing the tires of his Lamborghini Gallardo Spyder. However, 50 leaves in his Lamborghini Gallardo coupe. The final scene again shows 50 at his desk, opening the note that reads "I am the last thing you will think about, (heart) Vivica", and she detonates 50 Cent's office. However, he escapes and you see him standing beside her as the video fades.

The music video and song has over 35 million views on YouTube.

== Track listing ==
Digital single

1. "Do You Think About Me" (explicit album version) – 3:26
2. "Do You Think About Me" (music video/clean) – 3:52

UK promo CD

1. "Do You Think About Me" (super clean edit/clean album version) – 3:26
2. "Do You Think About Me" (Instrumental) – 3:26
3. "Do You Think About Me" (Does It Offend You Bobby Bloomfield Remix) – 5:34
4. "Do You Think About Me" (Space Cowboy Remix) – 4:01
5. "Do You Think About Me" (Raw Man) – 3:47
6. "Do You Think About Me" (Space Cowboy Dub Remix) – 7:14

US promo CD

1. "Do You Think About Me" (album version) – 3:26
2. "Do You Think About Me" (album clean) – 3:26
3. "Do You Think About Me" (instrumental) – 3:27

== Official versions ==
- "Do You Think About Me" (Explicit Album Version) / (Album Version - Explicit) / (Album Version) – 3:26
- "Do You Think About Me" (Super Clean Edit/Clean Album Version) / (Album Clean) – 3:26
- "Do You Think About Me" (Instrumental) – 3:26
- "Do You Think About Me" (Does It Offend You Bobby Bloomfield Remix) – 5:34
- "Do You Think About Me" (Raw Man) – 3:47
- "Do You Think About Me" (Space Cowboy Remix) – 4:01
- "Do You Think About Me" (Space Cowboy Dub Remix) – 7:14

== Charts ==
| Chart (2010) | Peak position |
|---|---|
| UK Hip Hop/R&B (Official Charts) | 32 |
| UK Singles (OCC) | 105 |
| US Bubbling Under Hot 100 (Billboard) | 7 |
| US Hot R&B/Hip-Hop Songs (Billboard) | 26 |
| US Hot Rap Songs (Billboard) | 15 |
| US Rhythmic Airplay (Billboard) | 33 |
