= Back to Love (DJ Pauly D song) =

Single by DJ Pauly D featuring Jay Sean
- Released: January 15, 2013
- Recorded: 2012
- Genre: Dance
- Length: 3:52
- Label: G-Note Records
- Songwriters: Jared Cotter, Jeremy Skaller, Jeremy David Skaller, Khaled Rohaim

DJ Pauly D singles chronology
| "Night of My Life" (2012) | "Back to Love" (2013) |

Jay Sean singles chronology
| "So High" (2012) | "Back to Love" (2013) |

Audio sample
- file; help

"Back to Love" is a single released by Italian-American television personality and disc jockey DJ Pauly D, featuring vocals from British singer Jay Sean. It was released as a Digital download in the United Kingdom on January 15, 2013. The song has peaked to number 113 on the UK Singles Chart and number 22 on the UK Dance Chart.

== Live performances ==
In January 2013, DJ Pauly D and Jay Sean performed the song live on The Ellen DeGeneres Show. On June 16, 2013, DJ Pauly D performed the song live on Miss USA 2013 competition during the Final Look.

== Music video ==
The music video for Back To Love was released on March 19, 2013. The video features both Jay Sean and Pauly D throughout.

=== Lyric video ===
A lyric music video to accompany the release of "Back to Love" was first released onto YouTube on January 15, 2013, at a total length of three minutes and fifty-four seconds.

== Track listing ==
Digital download
| No. | Title | Length |
|---|---|---|
| 1. | "Back to Love" (feat. Jay Sean) | 3:52 |

== Charts ==
=== Weekly charts ===
| Chart (2012–2013) | Peak position |
|---|---|
| Canada Hot 100 (Billboard) | 98 |
| UK Dance (OCC) | 22 |
| UK Singles (OCC) | 113 |
| US Bubbling Under Hot 100 (Billboard) | 7 |
| US Hot Dance/Electronic Songs (Billboard) | 7 |

=== Year-end charts ===
| Chart (2013) | Position |
|---|---|
| US Hot Dance/Electronic Songs (Billboard) | 72 |

== Release history ==
| Region | Date | Format | Label |
|---|---|---|---|
| United Kingdom | January 15, 2013 | Digital download | G-Note Records |
