= Forever King =

Mixtape by 50 Cent
- Released: July 3, 2009
- Recorded: 2009
- Genre: Hip hop
- Length: 44:35
- Label: G-Unit
- Producer: DJ Whoo Kid

50 Cent chronology
War Angel LP (2009)	Forever King (2009)	Before I Self Destruct (2009)

Forever King is a twelve-track mixtape by 50 Cent with 90s R&B samples provided by DJ Whoo Kid. The collection is dedicated to the death of Michael Jackson.

== Background ==
The collection was initially called Sincerely Southside Part 2, but the death of Michael Jackson stimulated a last minute renaming. Comparing to his last release, War Angel LP, 50 Cent stated:

This tape is different, I gave you "War Angel", you already know what that is. Now "Forever King". It has a 90's feel to it. Yall gonna love that right there.

The cover art for Forever King features 50 Cent's face and his New York Yankees cap digitally imposed on a skull encrusted with diamonds. Another version is more ordinary, featuring a jeweled skull with tilted crown.

== Critical reception ==
Professional ratings
Review scores
Source	Rating
XXL	(Hood)

Retrospectively, in a 2025 ranking of twenty 50 Cent albums and mixtapes, Al Shipley of Spin magazine placed Forever King 15th, writing that "the mixtape's relaxed vibe and '90s R&B samples were a big improvement from War Angel LP, though the sample of Michael Jackson's "I Wanna Be Where You Are" on "Michael Jackson Freestyle" felt like a "perfunctory last minute addition".

== Track listing ==
No.	Title	Length
1.	"I'm Paranoid"	3:24
2.	"Respect It or Check It"	4:43
3.	"Suicide Watch"	3:41
4.	"Things We Do"	3:08
5.	"Get the Money"	5:01
6.	"Funny How Time Flies"	3:52
7.	"If U Leaving, Then Leave..."	5:13
8.	"Dreaming"	4:38
9.	"Michael Jackson Freestyle"	2:29
10.	"London Girl Pt 2"	2:47
11.	"Touch Me"	3:49
12.	"Put That Work In"	1:48
