= Lomu =

Lomu is a surname from the Pacific Islands, and may refer to:

- Andrew Lomu (born 1979), Australian rugby league footballer
- Caleb Lomu (born 2004), American football player
- Jonah Lomu (1975–2015), New Zealand rugby union footballer

- Jonah Lomu Rugby, computer and video game released in 1997, referring to the New Zealand rugby union footballer
