= Before I Self Destruct =

Studio album by 50 Cent
- Released: November 16, 2009
- Recorded: June 2008–August 2009
- Genres: Gangsta rap; hardcore hip-hop
- Length: 57:23
- Labels: G-Unit; Shady; Aftermath; Violator; Interscope
- Producers: Eminem; Dr. Dre; DJ Khalil; Havoc; Mark Batson; Play-n-Skillz; Polow da Don; Rick Rock; Rockwilder; Tha Bizness; Ty Fyffe; Black Key; Phonix Beats; Ky Miller; DJ Matty Kats; Dual Output; J-Keys; Lab Ox; Vikaden; Manny Perez; Nascent; QB Da Problem; Phoenix; Team Demo; Team Ready

50 Cent chronology
Forever King (2009)	Before I Self Destruct (2009)	The Big 10 (2011)

Singles from Before I Self Destruct
- 1. "Baby by Me" Released: September 10, 2009; 2. "Do You Think About Me" Released: January 16, 2010

Before I Self Destruct is the fourth studio album by American rapper 50 Cent, released November 16, 2009, on Shady Records, Aftermath Entertainment, G-Unit Records, Interscope Records and Violator. The album is his final solo release with Shady, Aftermath and Interscope excluding his 2017 greatest hits album Best Of 50 Cent. An accompanying feature film of the same name coincided with its release, and is available within the album's packaging.

Before I Self Destruct debuted at number five on the US Billboard 200, becoming 50 Cent's fourth consecutive album to do so in the country, while its lead single, "Baby by Me", peaked at number 28 on the Billboard Hot 100.

== Background ==
Initially, Before I Self Destruct was planned to be 50 Cent's 2007 album, for which he confirmed he had already completed 12 songs. However, he decided to release Curtis instead, and thus Before I Self Destruct's release date was originally pushed back to 2008. In a red carpet interview 50 Cent stated that while he was working on the album, he wrote, produced, and directed his first film saying that the release of the film would coincide with the release of the album. Though a track list appeared in early January 2009, 50 Cent later stated he reworked much of the album. Another track stated to be on the album, though not officially confirmed as a single, entitled "Crime Wave" was released in late October 2009.

The album's release date was initially announced to be February 4, 2008, but later moved to March 2008, due to the release date of Curtis being pushed up to September 2007. However it was later revealed, in an interview with Tony Yayo and Lloyd Banks, that the album was scheduled to be released during the 4th quarter of 2008, with 50 Cent himself later stating that the album was due to be released December 9, 2008.

MTV later reported that the album would instead be released in 2009, with February 3 being the date 50 Cent himself confirmed. Though it was later pushed back to March 2009, with March 24 being set as the day, until he later confirmed that mentor and labelmate Eminem's album, Relapse, was going to be released before his own. 50 Cent then told MTV that he would release the album in June, with the date being changed once again as he decided to retool parts of the album once Eminem's Relapse was completed. However, the album was pushed back to a Fall 2009 release, with September being the specific month.

On Jimmy Kimmel Live!, 50 Cent stated that the album will be out "second week of September, I'll be back on the streets baby", with the date later stated to be specifically September 11, which at the time, was the release date of Jay-Z's The Blueprint 3. However, these reports were later contradicted by MTV, when they stated that 50 Cent exclusively confirmed the release date as September 29, 2009. The album was later officially confirmed to have been pushed back again by 50 Cent, who claimed November 3, 2009 as the newly confirmed release date, but this was once again changed to November 17, 2009. However, in October 2009, the album was pushed back a week to make the release date November 24, 2009. Universal has pushed several albums forward to November 23, 2009, including Before I Self Destruct.

50 stated that because the album leaked and the good response it got, he will release the album a week earlier, on November 16. The album was released exclusively on the iTunes Store on November 9 at 12:00am, while the physical copy was released in stores on November 16. Since the album was released digitally a week ahead of the physical copy, Interscope records requested that Billboard and Nielsen SoundScan uphold a rule instituted in 2008 where a label may ask Nielsen SoundScan to hold the digital sales count of an album for up to one week, and for Billboard to delay charting that album, when a leak results in a digital album beating its physical counterpart to brick and mortar stores.

== Music ==
=== Concept ===
50 Cent told MTV that he named the album Before I Self Destruct because "it could potentially happen." 50 Cent described the album as "darker" and more "aggressive" than his previous album and stated, "hands down, [it] will be the best record of that time period".

=== Production and guests ===
When speaking of producers and guests for the album, 50 Cent has stated Rich Harrison will be producing for the album, as well as Kanye West, though his track will not be featured. Other producers that have stated they will be working on the project include Sha Money XL and Ty-Fyffe, who posted his listening session on YouTube, Swizz Beatz, after not having any tracks make the final cut of Curtis, DJ Premier with a track entitled "Shut Your Bloodclot Mouth", and Dawaun Parker, who has stated he is featured on the single "I Get It In".

In contrast to Curtis, 50 Cent explained that fans "should not expect to see guest appearances like you saw on Curtis". He also described Before I Self Destruct as an entirely different concept, which will set up "the next batch of records" in his career. After 50 Cent's collaboration with Akon on "I'll Still Kill", which appeared on Curtis, Akon stated that 50 Cent and himself would be working on each other's upcoming albums due to the successful experience they developed while working on Curtis, and that, when working on songs, "Whoever’s album it feel right on, that’s where we gonna put it".

In an interview, Timbaland stated that he has worked with 50 Cent, but he did not know which albums (Curtis and Before I Self Destruct) the collaborations would end up on. This song was released on May 18, 2010, for internet download and is titled "You Should Be Dead". This song gained popularity and is a constant source of debate as to why it was not featured on the album. The Koalition website stated "It truly is amazing how 50 Cent’s leftover tracks are better than most rapper’s singles. A perfect example of this is You Should Be Dead".

A producer J.R. Rotem also spoke about working on the album, saying that 50 Cent is into "soulful" music, and he sat down and gave him numerous tacks and that on this album, 50 Cent was "[trying] to bring a very powerful new sound", and that is would be a "remarkable project". Play-N-Skillz also confirmed working with 50 Cent for the BISD project, saying:

Our rhythm on the drum pattern, we had to switch it up a little bit. 50 Cent said he wanted to go back to the boom-bap hard-core gangsta stuff. We tried to fit his style. I think 50 is gonna come back. He's a hitmaker. He's written a lot of hits for a lot of people. Sha told me 50's getting back in the Get Rich or Die Tryin' mode. 50 is a person who doesn't like to know who the producer is. He just likes to go in with the music. But Sha Money XL is going crazy for the tracks we sent.

== Singles ==
The album's intended lead single, "Get Up" was released for digital download on October 13, 2008, after earlier being released through 50 Cent's official Internet community ThisIs50.com. The song features production from American record producer Scott Storch, and peaked at number 44 on the Billboard Hot 100. The music video was released to Vevo on June 16, 2009. The intended second promotional single, "I Get It In", was released in early January 2009, with production credited to Dr. Dre. The song peaked at number 53 on the Billboard Hot 100. However, neither track appeared on the album, largely due to delays the album encountered.

The album's eventual lead promotional single, "OK, You're Right", was released for digital download on May 19, 2009, after originally being included on 50 Cent's seventh solo mixtape War Angel LP (2009). The song features production from Dr. Dre, with co-production from Mark Batson. However, the song under-performed commercially, peaking at only number 20 on the Bubbling Under R&B/Hip-Hop Songs chart in America. The album's lead single, "Baby by Me", was released for digital download on September 10, 2009. The song features American R&B singer Ne-Yo, and is produced by American record producer Polow da Don. The song peaked at number 28 on the Billboard Hot 100, and peaked in the upper regions of several national charts worldwide. The song features a sample from an earlier 50 Cent song, "I Get Money".

The album's second single, "Do You Think About Me", was released for digital download on January 16, 2010. The song features uncredited vocals from R&B singer Governor, and is produced by record producer Rockwilder. However, the song was one of 50 Cent's least commercially successful singles to date, only peaking at number 7 on the Bubbling Under Hot 100 Singles chart in America. During an interview with MTV, 50 Cent announced that the third single to be released will be Get It Hot. Shortly after this announcement, 50 Cent confirmed with MTV that "a visual" will be released for So Disrespectful. However this did not materialize.

== Commercial performance ==
The album sold 160,000 copies in its first week, debuting at number five on the Billboard 200, giving 50 Cent his fourth consecutive top five album in the US. Due to the album leaking on October 28, nearly four weeks ahead of the original release date of November 23, the album was released exclusively to iTunes on November 9, and was physically released in stores on November 16, a week later. Due to this unique circumstance, 50 Cent's label Interscope requested that Billboard and Nielsen Soundscan delay charting the album for a week, so the first week digital sales were added to the total number of albums sold between November 16 and 22. The album sold 46,000 copies during its iTunes exclusive week, meaning that 114,000 copies were sold between November 16 and 22.

In its 21st week the album sold 2,500 copies, which was not enough to land in the Billboard Top 200 albums chart. However, it landed at number 188 in the Top 200 Current Albums Chart. This was the last week the album would chart on the Billboard 200 or Billboard Top Current Albums Chart.

It was ranked 67th on the Billboard Year-End for 2010. The album was certified Gold for sales of 500,000 units.

== Critical reception ==
Professional ratings
Aggregate scores
Source	Rating
AnyDecentMusic?	4.7/10
Metacritic	62/100
Review scores
Source	Rating
AllMusic	3.5/5 stars
The A.V. Club	B−
Chicago Tribune	2/4 stars
Entertainment Weekly	B−
Pitchfork	6.0/10
PopMatters	7/10
Rolling Stone	3/5 stars
Slant Magazine	3/5 stars
Spin	5/10
USA Today	2.5/4 stars

Before I Self Destruct has received generally positive reviews from music critics. At Metacritic, which assigns a normalized rating out of 100 to reviews from mainstream critics, the album received an average score of 62, based on 15 reviews. AllMusic called it "a fantastic juggernaut of a 50 album if you exit early, and a very good one even if you don't". Entertainment Weekly wrote that "Growling violent threats over hard beats, 50 sounds the hungriest he has in years. Of course, there’s nothing remotely original about the formula he’s returning to, but at least he’s going through the motions with gusto". The A.V. Club said that, "If Destruct qualifies as a pleasant surprise, it’s only because 50 Cent’s last few releases set the bar so low. Still, for the first time since The Massacre, it’s once again intermittently fun to root for the bad guy" Pitchfork wrote that, "After initially promising a return to form, 50 doesn't have the ability or initiative to hold the listener's interest over the long run." PopMatters said that, "With surprisingly little filler, renewed energy, and the unique glimpse Before I Self Destruct offers into the psyche of a public figure as intriguing as Curtis Jackson, 50 Cent has crafted easily his best album since "Get Rich or Die Trying."

In a mixed review, Rolling Stone magazine called it "an album where 'Got more guns than a gun store' passes for wordplay — but that's how 50 sticks to basics". Greg Kot of the Chicago Tribune wrote that, "about halfway through the album, 50 Cent detours from the street to the bedroom." The New York Times wrote, "Taken as a whole this album has a pleasingly morbid tone, in keeping with the best moments from 50 Cent’s first two albums. But context is this album’s undoing." Slant Magazine's Jesse Cataldo stated, "Before I Self Destruct plays as a prudent step back ... the album possesses a sense of latent menace that's been left unexplored since his early mixtapes." Marc Hogan of Spin criticized 50 Cent's rapping on the album's first half and stated, "The last several tracks shift to the club -- sometimes smoothly (baby-making Ne-Yo duet 'Baby By Me'), more often not (baby-mama dis 'Do You Think About Me')". MSN Music's Robert Christgau gave the album a "dud" rating, indicating "a bad record whose details rarely merit further thought."

== Track listing ==
- All song samples, writing and production credits are according to the album booklet.

No.	Title	Writer(s)	Producer(s)	Length
1.	"The Invitation"	Curtis Jackson; Tyrone Fyffe; M. Williams	Ty Fyffe; Manny Perez (co.)	2:54
2.	"Then Days Went By"	Jackson; Darren Billy, Jr.; Bill Withers	Lab Ox; Vikaden (co.)	3:44
3.	"Death to My Enemies"	Jackson; Andre Young; Mark Batson; Trevor Lawrence, Jr.; Dawaun Parker; Mike Elizondo	Dr. Dre; Mark Batson	3:46
4.	"So Disrespectful"	Jackson; Justin Henderson; Matthew Katsikas; Chris Whitacre	Tha Bizness	3:39
5.	"Psycho" (featuring Eminem)	Jackson; Marshall Mathers; Young; Lawrence; Parker; Batson	Dr. Dre	4:45
6.	"Hold Me Down"	Jackson; J. Groover; Y. Davis	J-Keys; Team Ready	3:19
7.	"Crime Wave"	Jackson; J. Fragala; D. Zacharias; M. Katsikas; W. Witherspoon; A. Bond	Team Demo	3:44
8.	"Stretch"	Jackson; Ricardo Thomas	Rick Rock	4:07
9.	"Strong Enough"	Jackson; C. Ruelas; Q. Hysaw; C. McMurray; G. Jones; P. Sawyer; TeamJohnHill	Nascent; QB Da Problem	3:02
10.	"Get It Hot"	Jackson; M. Davis	Black Key	2:59
11.	"Gangsta's Delight"	Jackson; Kejuan Muchita; B. Edwards; N. Rodgers	Havoc	3:14
12.	"I Got Swag"	Jackson; R. Frazier; W. Hutchinson; D. Jolicoeur; K. Mercer	Dual Output	3:34
13.	"Baby by Me" (featuring Ne-Yo)	Jackson; Jamal Jones; Shaffer Smith	Polow da Don	3:33
14.	"Do You Think About Me" (featuring Governor)	Jackson; Dana Stinson; Governor Washington	Rockwilder	3:26
15.	"Ok, You're Right"	Jackson; A. Young; Mark Batson; T. Lawrence; D. Parker	Dr. Dre; Batson	3:04
16.	"Could've Been You" (featuring R. Kelly; bonus track)	C. Jackson; A. Young; R. Kelly; K. Rahman; C. Injeti	DJ Khalil; Chin Injeti	4:20
17.	"Flight 187" (Japanese bonus track)	C. Jackson	Phonix Beats	4:12
18.	"Man's World" (iTunes bonus track; removed from clean version)	C. Jackson; Miller Kyeme	Ky Miller	2:52

Notes

- Track 14 features additional vocals by Governor.

Sample credits

- "Then Days Went By" samples "Ain't No Sunshine" performed by Michael Jackson, originally by Bill Withers.
- "Psycho" samples "The Age of Love (OPM Mix)" performed by Age of Love.
- "Crime Wave" samples "I Can't Believe You're Gone" by The Barrino Brothers, and "This Is Family" by Fabolous.
- "Strong Enough" samples "If I Were Your Woman" by Gladys Knight & the Pips.
- "Gangsta's Delight" samples "Rapper's Delight" by The Sugarhill Gang.
- "I Got Swag" samples "A Love That's Worth Having" by Willie Hutch; "Plug Tunin'" by De La Soul.
- "Baby by Me" samples "I Get Money" by 50 Cent.

== Personnel ==
- Curtis Jackson – vocals, executive producer
- Michael Clervoix – executive producer
- Steve Baughman – mixed on tracks 1–2, 4, 6, 8–9, 11–12 and 14
- Mark Batson – keyboards on tracks 3 and 5
- Dawaun Parker – keyboards on tracks 3 and 5
- Ryan Terry (Tedkins) – guest vocals on track 5; keyboards on track 7
- Trevor Lawrence – keyboards on tracks 3 and 5; live hats on track 16
- Mike Elizondo – keyboards on track 3
- Andre Young – mixed on tracks 3, 5 and 16
- Marshall Mathers – guest vocals on track 5
- Ky Miller – mixed on tracks 7, 10 and 15
- Shaffer Smith – guest vocals on track 13
- Fabian Marasciullo – mixed on track 13
- Governor Washington – additional vocals on track 14
- Chris Grayson – additional keys on track 14
- Khalil Abdul-Rahman – keyboards and drum programming on track 16
- Pranam Injeti – guitars and bass on track 16
- Robert Kelly – guest vocals on track 16 (international version)
- Jovan Dais – guest vocals on track 18 (deluxe version)

== Charts ==
=== Weekly charts ===
Chart (2009)	Peak position
Australian Albums (ARIA)	19
Austrian Albums (Ö3 Austria)	41
Belgian Albums (Ultratop Flanders)	34
Belgian Albums (Ultratop Wallonia)	47
Canadian Albums (Billboard)	11
Dutch Albums (Album Top 100)	54
French Albums (SNEP)	15
German Albums (Offizielle Top 100)	36
Irish Albums (IRMA)	18
Italian Albums (FIMI)	67
New Zealand Albums (RMNZ)	35
Scottish Albums (Official Charts)	21
Swiss Albums (Schweizer Hitparade)	13
UK Albums (Official Charts)	22
US Billboard 200	5
US Top R&B/Hip-Hop Albums (Billboard)	1
US Top Rap Albums (Billboard)	1

=== Year-end charts ===
Chart (2009)	Position
French Albums (SNEP)	180

Chart (2010)	Position
US Billboard 200	67
US Top R&B/Hip-Hop Albums (Billboard)	19

== Certifications ==
Region	Certification	Certified units/sales
New Zealand (RMNZ)	Gold	7,500^{‡}
United Kingdom (BPI)	Gold	100,000^{‡}
United States (RIAA)	Gold	500,000^{^}
^{^} Shipments figures based on certification alone.^{‡} Sales+streaming figures based on certification alone.

== Release history ==
Country	Date	Label	Format
United States	November 9, 2009	Interscope Records	iTunes download
Germany	November 13, 2009	Universal Music	CD, CD+DVD, digital download
United States	November 16, 2009	Interscope Records	CD, Super Deluxe Edition CD+2 DVD (Best Buy exclusive)
United Kingdom	November 16, 2009	Polydor Records	Standard (CD, digital download); Deluxe (CD+DVD)
France	November 16, 2009	Interscope Records	CD, digital download
Japan	November 18, 2009	Universal International	CD, digital download
Brazil	November 27, 2009	Universal Music	CD, digital download
