= Ok, You're Right =

"OK, You're Right"

Promotional single by 50 Cent

from the album Before I Self Destruct and War Angel LP
- Released: May 19, 2009
- Recorded: 2009
- Genre: Hip-hop
- Length: 3:04
- Label: Aftermath; Shady; Interscope; Universal
- Songwriters: Curtis Jackson; Andre Young; Mark Batson; Trevor Lawrence Jr.; Dawaun Parker
- Producers: Dr. Dre; Mark Batson

"Ok, You're Right" is the first promotional single by rapper 50 Cent from his fourth album, Before I Self Destruct. It also appears as the first promo single for his mixtape War Angel LP, the song is also featured on Tony Yayo's mixtape The Swine Flu.

== Background ==
The song was produced and mixed by Dr. Dre when 50 Cent was in Detroit with Eminem and Dr. Dre. The clean version of the single was leaked by Hot 97's Funkmaster Flex on May 18, 2009. In a couple of hours, the official version of the song was released on 50 Cent's official internet community Thisis50.com.

== Music video ==
The music video was released on July 1, 2009, through 50 Cent's Thisis50.com. There was a countdown clock made by Thisis50.com two days before the released date of the music video. A contest was made by Hot 97 and Thisis50.com, the winners of the contest would have a cameo in the music video. Hot 97 and Thisis50.com team up again for a behind-the-scenes video hosted by Hot97 radio personalities Cipha Sounds and Peter Rosenberg from "The Cipha/Rosenberg Experience".

The music video was inspired by Philips Cinema 21:9's film Carousel, which was awarded the Cannes-Lion 2009 Grand Prix. It was directed by Dan The Man and Chris "Broadway" Romero, and portrays 50 Cent as a clown robber as it depicts an adaptation of the frozen frame shot of a robbery and shootout. This is similar to the opening scene of the 2008 summer blockbuster film The Dark Knight. The video also contain promotional advertisement from Carousel, a 139-second advertisement directed by Berg for Philips, won the Film Grand Prix at the Cannes Lions International Advertising Festival, the most prestigious award in the advertising industry.

There were several cameo in the video G-Unit's Lloyd Banks and Tony Yayo, professional basketball player Tim Thomas and former Disturbing tha Peace artist Serius Jones.

The music video on YouTube has received over 30 million views as of April 2024.

== Remix ==
There have been four remixes to the song, one by Maino, one by Cassidy, third by Brooklyn rapper Papoose, and the fourth one by Hell Rell called "Okay You're Dead".

== Charts position ==
Chart (2009)	Peak position
US Bubbling Under R&B/Hip-Hop Singles (Billboard)	20
