= Cold Winter =

2005 video game

- Developer: Swordfish Studios
- Publisher: Vivendi Universal Games (Note: Released under the Sierra Entertainment brand name)
- Director: Julian Widdows
- Writer: Warren Ellis
- Composer: Mark Willot
- Engine: RenderWare
- Platform: PlayStation 2
- Release: NA: May 10, 2005; EU: June 3, 2005
- Genre: First-person shooter
- Modes: Single-player, multiplayer

Cold Winter is a 2005 first-person shooter video game developed by Swordfish Studios and published by Vivendi Universal Games for the PlayStation 2. Its story was written by Warren Ellis.

== Plot ==
Andrew Sterling is a former British SAS soldier working for MI6, who has been captured in the People's Republic of China and jailed in Chang political prison; MI6 destroyed all files on Sterling to prevent an international incident. He is rescued the night before his execution by an old female acquaintance named Kim and a former fellow SAS soldier Daniel Parish. To repay his debt to Parish for saving his life, Andrew agrees to work for his private security agency. Sterling then travels to Egypt to eliminate the leaders of an arms dealing cartel, who possess a missile guidance system called Octopus. He completes his mission, but at the cost of Kim's life.

The antagonist is John Grey (voiced by Tom Baker), who as a young man was enlisted in the RAF to defend Britain at the height of World War II. Horrified by nuclear weapons John Grey formed a secret society, "Greywings" inspired by the heroes of the H. G. Wells novel The Shape of Things to Come. Greywings sought out and destroyed nuclear threats but ultimately came to the conclusion that the only way to abolish nuclear warfare would be to create a nuclear winter leaving the survivors afraid of nuclear warfare. Greywings planned on initiating their plan codenamed Operation: Cold Winter by providing world powers with the Octopus guidance systems.

It turns out that Grey hired Parish to liquidate the Egyptian arms ring because they stole an Octopus unit which was intended for world superpowers rather than the third world countries its thieves planned on selling it to. Grey soon after betrays his own organization to save the life of his infant granddaughter. Sterling is sent to Greywing's headquarters in the Himalayan mountains where he destroys the facility's power core and escapes in Parish's helicopter. Grey is then seen in the game's last scene on a bench in Prague where his former subordinates murder him.

== Gameplay ==
The game uses the Karma physics engine, allowing for interactivity with items in the game world and for ragdoll effects. Cover can also be improvised by using objects in the environment; for example, the player can flip a table to provide cover or grab a table and block a door. Additionally the game features dismemberment system similar to the one used in Soldier of Fortune. Over 30 weapons are available and player can craft gadgets and explosives from items scattered around the levels.

The game offers a multiplayer component that supports up to four players offline and eight players online; in the offline mode, human players may be substituted for CPU-controlled. There are a dozen maps and six modes, including deathmatch and king of the hill.

== Reception ==
Reception

Aggregate score
Aggregator	Score
Metacritic	73/100

Review scores
Publication	Score
Edge	6/10
Electronic Gaming Monthly	6.83/10
Eurogamer	7/10
Game Informer	8.25/10
GamePro	4.5/5
GameRevolution	C−
GameSpot	7.5/10
GameSpy	3.5/5
GameTrailers	6.9/10
GameZone	7.4/10
IGN	7.5/10
Official U.S. PlayStation Magazine	3.5/5
The Sydney Morning Herald	3.5/5
The Times	3/5

The game received "average" reviews according to the review aggregation website Metacritic.

It was one of the five games nominated by GameSpot for the title of Best Story of 2005, with a comment: "A poignant, well-told story penned by Warren Ellis helps make Cold Winter a more engaging experience than your average first-person shooter." The website considered the game to be sonically and graphically average, but an enjoyable straightforward shooter with a decent online mode. Whilst not the best game of its type it was "definitely worth playing".
