= World Championship Rugby =

2004 video game

- Developer: Swordfish Studios
- Publisher: Acclaim Entertainment
- Platforms: Microsoft Windows, PlayStation 2, Xbox
- Release: PlayStation 2, Xbox: EU: 8 April 2004; Windows: EU: 30 April 2004
- Genre: Rugby union
- Modes: Single player, multiplayer

World Championship Rugby is a computer and video game developed after the 2003 Rugby World Cup. It was developed by Swordfish Studios and published by Acclaim Entertainment.

As well as all the teams and games from the 2003 Rugby World Cup, the game includes a number of other tournaments, such as Six Nations, Tri Nations, custom leagues and cups, classic matches and tour games. There is also a feature to beat the all- stars with every team in the game and a survival game. The only licensed teams in the game are England and Wales, however, included is a name editor that allows the fake player names to be changed.

== Development ==
Following England Rugby's success at the 2003 Rugby World Cup in Australia, Acclaim Entertainment International announced in November 2003 that they would be releasing World Championship Rugby for PlayStation 2, Xbox and PC in Europe the following year. It is a fast-paced rugby game, with the emphasis on scoring many tries. Commentary was provided by Miles Harrison and Stuart Barnes. The game was developed at the United Kingdom-based Swordfish Studios, by a team which included several staff who had worked on Jonah Lomu Rugby.

== See also ==
- Jonah Lomu Rugby
