= War Angel LP =

2009 mixtape by 50 Cent

Mixtape by 50 Cent
- Released: June 16, 2009
- Recorded: 2009
- Genre: Hip hop
- Length: 31:25
- Label: G-Unit
- Producer: Dr. Dre; Frank Dukes; Team Green Productions; Digga; Phonix Beats; DJ DB

50 Cent chronology
Curtis (2007)	War Angel LP (2009)	Forever King (2009)

War Angel LP is a mixtape by American rapper 50 Cent. It was released on June 16, 2009, via his community website, Thisis50.com, as a free download.

== Background ==
On June 11, 2009, it was announced that 50 Cent was to digitally release new material over his community website. The rapper stated his new project entitled War Angel LP, would be more like a "street album" than a mixtape. 50 Cent also claimed that it would be the "best" underground project to date.

When speaking on the title, 50 Cent stated:

I didn't want to write 'Angel Demon'. It's not the contrast between good and bad. But...if someone's at war, I'm sure they're saying their prayers. They believe they have angels around them. What would you call an angel around a soldier at war? That's why I titled it that.

=== Production and guests ===
Dr. Dre, one of 50 Cent's mentors, produced the single "Ok, Ya Right", which was originally released several weeks prior as "Ok, You're Right". Robin Thicke, who previously contributed to 50 Cent's album Curtis, is featured on the track "Cocaine". The track "Better Come on Your A Game" also features a background vocal sample from Alan Titchmarsh, British gardening celebrity, discussing the numerous benefits of potted water features.

=== Videos ===
A video for "I'll Do Anything" was released on June 23, 2009, with G-Unit members Lloyd Banks and Tony Yayo making guest appearances. Another video, for "Ok, You're Right" was released on July 1, 2009.

=== Critical reception ===
Professional ratings
Review scores
Source	Rating
AllHipHop	(7.5/10)
DJBooth	3.5/5 stars
HipHopDX	3.5/5 stars
Pitchfork Media	(1.8/10)
RapReviews	(8/10)

In a 2025 ranking of twenty 50 Cent albums and mixtapes, Spin magazine's Al Shipley placed War Angel LP last, giving some praise to the production while dismissing 50 Cent's lyrics as "mostly tiresome tough guy bluster". Shipley deemed "Cocaine" to be the "smooth and cinematic" highlight of the mixtape, though he panned 50 Cent's "goofy" British accent on "London Girl", as well as homophobic lyrics in "C.R.E.A.M. 2009".

== Track listing ==
No.	Title	Producer(s)	Length
1.	"I Line Niggas"	Team Green	2:13
2.	"Talking in Codes"	Frank Dukes	3:07
3.	"OK, Alright"	Dr. Dre	3:07
4.	"Redrum (Murder)"	Nascent	3:06
5.	"C.R.E.A.M. 2009"	Digga	3:04
6.	"I'll Do Anything"	Phonix Beats	3:12
7.	"London Girl"	DJ DB	3:21
8.	"Better Come on Your A Game"		2:24
9.	"Get the Message"	Chinky P	2:50
10.	"Cocaine" (featuring Robin Thicke)	Robin Thicke, Pro-Jay	2:41
11.	"I Gotta Win"		3:00
12.	"Mixtape Outro"		0:47
Total length:			31:25
