= Zun Zun Rompiendo Caderas =

Single by Wisin & Yandel

from the album Los Vaqueros: El Regreso
- Released: December 6, 2010 (U.S. radio); December 7, 2010 (digital download)
- Genre: Hip house; electropop
- Length: 3:19 (album version); 3:42 (remix with Pitbull and Tego Calderón)
- Label: Machete
- Songwriters: Juan Luis Morena; Llandel Veguilla; Marco Masís
- Producers: Victor "El Nasi"; Tainy

Wisin & Yandel singles chronology
"No Me Digas Que No" (2010)	"Zun Zun Rompiendo Caderas" (2010)	"No Dejemos Que se Apague" (2010)

"Zun Zun Rompiendo Caderas" (English: "Zun Zun Breaking Hips") is a song performed by reggaeton duo Wisin & Yandel. The song is taken from their compilation album Los Vaqueros: El Regreso as the first promotional single from the album. It was sent to radio stations on December 6, 2010 and released for digital download on December 7, 2010. The official remix features Tego Calderón and Pitbull. The music video won best Latino artist at 2011 MTV Video Music Awards.

== Background ==
The song is written by themselves and Marco Masís better known as "Tainy", also co-producer of the song. Before to the song was released, the track "Tu Olor" was planned to be the first single, but in the end was changed. Many fans have cited similarities between "Zun Zun Rompiendo Caderas" and their smash hits "Sexy Movimiento" and "Abusadora", due to the song structure and the Electro/Dance sound.

== Chart performance ==
On the week of January 22, 2011 the song debuted at no. 50 on the Billboard Latin Songs, making their 21st entry to the chart, currently at no. 12 and at number 38 on the Latin Tropical Songs, currently at no. 8. On the week of January 29, 2011 the song debuted at number 37 on the Latin Pop Songs chart and has reached no. 11.

== Music video ==
The music video for the song was shot the weekend of December 17–20, 2010. It was directed by Jessy Terrero, a video for the remix version with Pitbull and Tego Calderón, was also filmed the same day in Miami. The music video was premiered on January 27, 2011. The music video for the remix was premiered on March 27, 2011 through their website, it features guest collaborators Pitbull and Tego Calderón. The music video won best Latino artist at 2011 MTV Video Music Awards.

== Charts ==
Chart (2011)	Peak position
US Hot Latin Songs (Billboard)	12
US Tropical Airplay (Billboard)	8
US Latin Pop Airplay (Billboard)	8
US Latin Rhythm Airplay (Billboard)	5
