= Son of Pain =

Studio album by Governor
- Released: September 12, 2006 (U.S.)
- Recorded: 2005–2006
- Genre: R&B; soul
- Length: 55 min
- Label: Warlock; Grand Hustle; Atlantic
- Producer: T.I. (exec.); Jason Geter (exec.); Poke & Tone; Eddie Scoresazy; Del Pearson; Scott Storch; Raphael Saadiq; Jake and the Phatman; Kevin "Khao" Cates; Just Blaze; Charlamagne; DJ Static; Arden Altino; Jerry "Wonda" Duplessis; Wyclef Jean; Alonzo Jackson; Manistyles; Ricciano Lumpkins

Singles from Son of Pain
- 1. "Blood, Sweat & Tears" Released: 2006; 2. "You Got the Power" Released: 2006

Professional ratings
Review scores
Source	Rating
Allmusic	3.5/5 stars

Son of Pain is the debut album by Governor. Released under Grand Hustle on September 12, 2006, it peaked at 50 on the U.S. Billboard Top R&B/Hip-Hop Albums chart.

== Track listing ==
#	Title	Producer(s)	Sample(s)	Time
1	"Blood, Sweat & Tears"	Poke & Tone	Contains a sample and elements from "Singing This Song For My Mother" by Hamilton Bohannon.	3:40
2	"Out of My Hands"	Eddie Scoresazy	Contains a sample and elements of "Friends And Lovers" by Act One.	4:10
3	"Forgive Me"	Eddie Scoresazy	Contains samples of "Lazy Susan" by Dawn.	3:20
4	"Be Yourself"	Del Pearson		4:03
5	"Destiny"	Scott Storch		5:19
6	"Never Wanna Leave"	Raphael Saadiq (Co-produced by Jake and the Phatman)		7:10
7	"Slow Down"	Kevin "Khao" Cates	Contains excerpts from "Do It Twice" by Bob Marley & The Wailers.	4:35
8	"You Got the Power" (featuring T.I.)	Just Blaze	Contains a sample of "Easy Lover" by Philip Bailey featuring Phil Collins.	4:14
9	"Move Easy"	Charlamagne and DJ Static (Co-produced by Arden Altino)	Contains excerpts from "No More Trouble" by Bob Marley & The Wailers.	3:16
10	"Make Love to You"	Jerry "Wonda" Duplessis and Wyclef Jean		3:31
11	"That's What I'm Talkin'"	Alonzo Jackson		4:05
12	"On My Way"	Manistyles		4:42
13	"I Can't"	Ricciano Lumpkins	Embodies portions of "Somewhere Down The Road" written by T. Snow and C. Weil.	4:33

== Charts ==
Chart (2006)	Position
U.S. Billboard Top R&B/Hip-Hop Albums	50
U.S. Billboard Top Heatseekers	44
