= List of East Coast hip-hop record labels =

This is a list of notable East Coast hip hop music record labels.

- American King Music, founded in 2006 by Mims
- ASAP Worldwide, founded in 2011 by ASAP Rocky and ASAP Yams
- Babygrande, founded in 2001 by DJ Chuck Wilson
- Bad Boy Records, founded in 1993 by Sean Combs
- Blacksmith Records, founded in 2005 by Talib Kweli and Cory Smith
- Bloodline Records, founded in 2000 by DMX
- Cold Chillin' Records, founded in 1987 by Tyrone Williams
- D-Block Records, founded in 2001 by The Lox
- Dame Dash Music Group, founded in 2005 by Damon Dash
- Def Jam Recordings, founded in 1983 by Rick Rubin and Russell Simmons
- Definitive Jux, founded in 1999 by Jaime "El-P" Meline and Amaechi Uzoigwe
- Desert Storm Records, founded in 1997 by Duro and DJ Clue
- Diplomat Records, founded in 2002 by Cam'ron and Jim Jones
- Dream Chasers Records, founded in 2012 by Meek Mill
- Duck Down Records, founded in 1995 by Dru Ha and Buckshot
- Enjoy Records, founded in 1962 by Bobby Robinson
- Flipmode Records, founded in 1994 by Busta Rhymes
- Fort Knocks Entertainment, founded in 2004 by Just Blaze
- Full Surface Records, founded in 2001 by Swizz Beatz
- G-Unit Records, founded in 2003 by 50 Cent
- Get Low Records, founded in 1999 by Memphis Bleek
- Good Hands Records, founded in 2002 by DJ Truth and Art Beeswax
- Griselda Records, founded in 2014 by Westside Gunn and Conway the Machine
- Ill Will Records, founded in 1999 by Nas
- Infamous Records, founded in 2000 by Mobb Deep
- Murder Inc. Records, founded in 1998 by Irv Gotti and Chris Gotti
- Loud Records, founded in 1991 by Steve Rifkind
- M3 Records, founded in 2003 by Masta Ace
- MVBEMG, founded in 2011 by Sosa
- MVB Records, founded in 2006 by Abdel Russell
- Rawkus Records, founded in 1995 by Brian Brater and Jarret Myer
- Relativity Records, founded in 1982 by Barry Kobrin
- Luke Records, founded in 1990 by Uncle Luke
- Roc-A-Fella Records, founded in 1994 by Jay-Z, Damon Dash and Kareem Burke
- Ruff Ryders, founded in 1988, by The Dean Family
- RSMG, founded in 2005 by Russell Simmons
- Select Records, founded in 1981 by Fred Munao
- Streetsweepers Entertainment, founded in 2000 by DJ Kay Slay
- Terror Squad Entertainment, founded in 1997 by Fat Joe
- Tommy Boy Entertainment, founded in 1981 by Tom Silverman
- Slip-n-Slide Records, founded in 1994 by Ted Lucas
- TrapHouse Icon, founded in 2001 by Mark. R
- TVT Records, founded in 1985 by Steve Gottlieb
- Uptown Records, founded in 1986 by Andre Harrell
- Violator, founded by Chris Lighty
- ZNO Records, founded in 2001 by Benzino
