= 50 Cent: Blood on the Sand =

2009 video game

- European cover art
- Developer: Swordfish Studios
- Publisher: THQ
- Director: Julian Widdows
- Designers: Tim Austin; Gavin Cooper; Ed Kay
- Artists: Fergus Duggan; Mark O'Kane; Andrew Taylor
- Writer: Kamran Pasha
- Composer: Swizz Beatz
- Engine: Unreal Engine 3
- Platforms: PlayStation 3, Xbox 360
- Release: EU: February 20, 2009; NA: February 24, 2009
- Genre: Third-person shooter
- Modes: Single-player, multiplayer

50 Cent: Blood on the Sand is a third-person shooter video game developed by Swordfish Studios and published by THQ for the PlayStation 3 and Xbox 360. It serves as the sequel to 50 Cent: Bulletproof, and was released in February 2009. The game centers around a fictional 50 Cent and G-Unit concert, set in an unspecified location in the Middle East. After the group's payment, a diamond-encrusted skull, is stolen, they must fight to retrieve it from the thieves.

Blood on the Sand came out of a Covert-One cancelled project at Swordfish Studios, which was tweaked to be less serious. In 2008, Vivendi Games, the initial publisher, merged with Activision. That resulted in the company dropping support for the title, with an uncertain future regarding its release. As the game neared completion, Swordfish Studios leadership finalized a deal to transition themselves into Codemasters Birmingham under Codemasters. Shortly after, THQ took over the publishing rights for the game.

The game was positively received upon release, with praise directed at 50 Cent's involvement. Despite being noted as an improvement over Bulletproof, it was a commercial failure.

== Plot ==
The game is set in an urban warzone in an unnamed Middle Eastern country, where 50 Cent and G-Unit have been hired to perform a concert. After the concert, the promoter, Anwar, is unable to pay them the $10 million in cash he promised but relents after being threatened. However, instead of the cash they were promised, he gives them a diamond-and-pearl encrusted human skull as collateral. This is stolen by a paramilitary group led by the terrorist Said Kamal and his right hand woman Leila. 50 Cent (with the help of a selected G-Unit partner) decides to get it back at any cost, and soon they find out that there is a much bigger enemy than Kamal.

== Gameplay ==
Blood on the Sand includes on-foot combat, as well as vehicle missions such as a driver-and-turret-gunner Humvee H2 road chase and a helicopter-borne minigun shootout. There are also boss battles against helicopters.

The game has a feature called the "Shop" (activated in the game by placing a call on payphones hidden on each level), where the characters can use cash to buy new weapons, upgrade their old weapons, and learn hand-to-hand combat moves called "Counter-Kills". Cash can be used to unlock Taunts (each rated by "Profanity", "Braggin'" and "Triple X" levels), which increase the points earned from kills.

Weapons are graded from 1 to 10 by capacity, damage rating, and accuracy, and also list possible weapon enhancements. Players can use a mode called "Gangsta Fire" (50 Cent's variation on the slo-mo "bullet-time" concept used in Max Payne) to take on multiple opponents at once.

Each level has target enemies (five per level; each is just a high-value target, not a "Level Boss"), crates of gold bars (which are broken open to earn money), as well as collectibles like posters (5 per level). Kills grant points, which help the player to earn bronze, silver, and gold G-Unit Badges; these unlock better weapons, counter-kills, and taunts in the "Shop".

It also features more music tracks than the first game (40+ tracks in all); 50 Cent made 18 exclusive tracks just for the game. Swizz Beatz, Lab Ox and The Individuals made the original score for the game. There are also unlockable songs and videos.

== Development ==
Around 2007, Swordfish Studios was looking to publish a video game based on novel series Covert-One, to coincide with a TV show's release. However, the series got cancelled, and so was the game at the same time. They also considered making it into a Tom Clancy game, but it was scrapped as they didn't own the rights to Clancy's name. After that, Vivendi Games offered the studio to develop a sequel based on 50 Cent: Bulletproof. While certain parts of the Covert-One project got repurposed during its development (like cover system), Blood on the Sand was being made with a lighter tone in mind. The animations were done from scratch to have a more "rap" feeling to it. 50 Cent and G-Unit occasionally visited the developers to offer some feedback. Every few months, Vivendi would show them a presentation of the game, named as "big release" builds. One of the late additions were the helicopters, due to 50 Cent's son asking for them during the build's playthrough.

The game was officially announced by Vivendi Games subsidiary Sierra Entertainment on March 27, 2008, with no release window announced. Vivendi Games Mobile announced a mobile game based on the title as well, under the same name.

Development of the game went into limbo when Vivendi Games' merger with Activision to form Activision Blizzard was finalized. On July 28, 2008, Activision Blizzard announced that only five Sierra titles would be published through Activision, and 50 Cent: Blood on the Sand was not one of them. Eventually, THQ announced they had purchased the publishing rights to the game from Activision on October 13, 2008.

== Reception ==
Reception

Aggregate score
| Aggregator | Score |
|---|---|
| Metacritic | 71/100 (X360); 72/100 (PS3) |

Review scores
| Publication | Score |
|---|---|
| 1Up.com | C |
| Computer and Video Games | 7/10 (X360) |
| Edge | 7/10 |
| Eurogamer | 7/10 |
| Game Informer | 8/10 |
| GamePro | 3.5/5 |
| GameSpot | 7/10 |
| GameTrailers | 7/10 |
| GameZone | 6.5/10 |
| IGN | 7.1/10; 7.6/10 (UK); 7.5/10 (Australia) |
| Official Xbox Magazine (US) | 6.5/10 (X360) |
| Play | 70% (PS3) |
| X-Play | 4/5 (X360) |
| The A.V. Club | C |
| Maxim | 4/5 |
| USA Today | 3.5/5 |

Unlike Bulletproof, which received generally mixed reviews, Blood on the Sand was better received by video game critics, scoring a 7 out of 10 on GameSpot and a 4/5 on X-Play. Jeff Gerstmann of Giant Bomb said the story was "mostly nonsense, with a lot of half-assed dialogue that's usually delivered by people who sound like they have a plane to catch". IGN praised the solid gunplay and strong co-op though they noted that the repetitive nature of the gameplay meant that it did not have great lasting appeal. Chris Watters of GameSpot said "it works surprisingly well. This isn't the best action game you'll play this year, but that doesn't mean you won't have a damn fun time playing it." Garnett Lee of 1Up.com gave the game a C, and agreed with Watter's assessment, saying "Blood in the Sand takes its missteps in stride. The game doesn't takes itself too seriously and if you try to, it completely unravels."

In Charlie Brooker's Gameswipe, Brooker gave the game a negative review, quoting the game and saying "'Where'd she go? That bitch who took my skull?', that's the entire storyline", and later stated that "there are plenty of atrocious cutscenes detailing a story that's impossible to care about, during which 50 Cent scowls a lot and generally behaves like a prick."

=== Sales ===
The game was a commercial failure. As of April 2009, 50 Cent: Blood on the Sand sold an estimated 56,000 units in the United States, not enough to make another installment for the series. The game was not released in Germany, likely due to fears that it would be indexed by the Federal Department for Media Harmful to Young Persons.
