= The Pauly D Project =

American reality television series

- Gerard "Big Jerry" Gialanella, Jason "JROC" Craig, Paul "Pauly D" DelVecchio, Ryan Labbe and Michael "Biggie" Morgan (from left)
- Genre: Reality
- Starring: Pauly D; Gerard "Big Jerry" Gialanella; Jason "JROC" Craig; Michael "Biggie" Morgan; Ryan Labbe
- Theme music composer: Pauly D (feat. Dash)
- Opening theme: "Night of My Life"
- Country of origin: United States
- Original language: English
- No. of seasons: 1
- No. of episodes: 12

Production
- Executive producers: Jacquelyn French; Janay Dutton; Larry Rudolph; SallyAnn Salsano
- Producer: Adam Leber
- Running time: 20 to 22 minutes
- Production companies: 495 Productions; ReignDeer Entertainment; MTV Production Development

Original release
- Network: MTV
- Release: March 29 – June 14, 2012

Related
- Jersey Shore

The Pauly D Project is an American reality television spin-off series that aired on MTV following Jersey Shore cast mate PaulyD. The series debuted on March 29, 2012 and concluded on June 14, 2012.

== Production history ==
On April 7, 2011, MTV announced it had picked up two Jersey Shore spin-off shows featuring cast members Pauly D, JWoww and Snooki, picking up twelve episodes of each show. SallyAnn Salsano of 495 Productions was the executive producer of both spin-offs. They later announced the cast additions of nightclub owners Jason "JROC" Craig and Ryan Labbe.

On August 3, 2012, MTV announced that Snooki & Jwoww had been renewed for a second season, but The Pauly D Project was canceled.

== Cast ==
- Paul "Pauly D" Delvecchio
- Gerard "Big Jerry" Gialanella
- Jason "JROC" Craig
- Michael "Biggie" Morgan
- Ryan Labbe

== Episodes ==
No.	Title	Original release date	US viewers (millions)
1	"Hello Pressure! I'm Pauly D."	March 29, 2012	2.90
This series follows "Jersey Shore" star Pauly Delvecchio as he pursues his DJ dreams. In the premiere, Pauly D. brings his hometown pals along on a trip to Las Vegas, where he auditions to become the resident DJ at the Palms Casino.
2	"The Suite Life"	April 5, 2012	1.72
Pauly and his crew move into their Las Vegas suite. On their first night out, Ryan has a meltdown, possibly putting Pauly's residency at the Palms in jeopardy.
3	"Fools Rush In"	April 12, 2012	1.67
Pauly has trouble finding love in Las Vegas; Jerry and Biggie try to persuade Ryan to lay off the alcohol for the sake of Pauly's career.
4	"The Ring Toss"	April 19, 2012	1.54
Pauly gets mixed up with a married woman in the Las Vegas club scene. Meanwhile, Biggie tells the guys he wants to propose to Mary Jane.
5	"The Troops Are Here!"	April 26, 2012	1.24
Pauly is asked to perform at an Army base for troops being deployed to Afghanistan.
6	"Where the Heart Is"	May 3, 2012	1.30
The guys return home to Rhode Island and Pauly surprises an ailing fan. Also: Biggie makes a big decision; Jerry goes on a date; Pauly visits his ex-girlfriend.
7	"Spirits & Angels"	May 10, 2012	1.11
Back in Vegas, the boys try to trick Biggie into going to a strip club, which could get him into trouble with MJ. Meanwhile, Angel pays Pauly a surprise visit.
8	"Spin City"	May 17, 2012	1.21
Biggie becomes irritated with Ryan after he gives Pauly alcohol before his set. Meanwhile, Pauly's ex Angel enjoys her time in Vegas.
9	"A Good Impression"	May 24, 2012	0.88
Now that he has the ring, Biggie asks MJ's parents' permission to marry their daughter. Meanwhile, Pauly gets invited to have his hands imprinted at Planet Hollywood in New York City.
10	"Cents and the City"	May 31, 2012	1.01
Pauly meets with 50 Cent's record label. Later, the guys return to Rhode Island and Pauly is asked to perform at a major concert.
11	"Divas, Diamonds and D..."	June 7, 2012	1.03
The guys travel to Puerto Rico, where Pauly will open for Britney Spears. While there, they celebrate Jerry's birthday, and Biggie prepares to propose.
12	"PD Was Here"	June 14, 2012	1.09
Biggie finally asks Mary Jane to marry him on the gang's last night in Puerto Rico. Back in Rhode Island, Pauly contemplates his future and surprises students at his old high school by performing at their winter dance.
