= No Dejemos Que se Apague =

"No Dejemos Que Se Apague"

Single by Wisin & Yandel featuring 50 Cent & T-Pain

from the album Los Vaqueros: El Regreso
- Released: December 21, 2010
- Genre: Hip-hop; schaffel
- Length: 4:24
- Label: WY; Machete
- Songwriters: Juan Luis Morena; Llandel Veguilla; Faheem Rasheed Najm; Ernesto F. Padilla; Víctor Martínez
- Producers: Nesty "La Mente Maestra"; Victor "El Nasi"

Wisin & Yandel singles chronology
| "Zun Zun Rompiendo Caderas" (2010) | "No Dejemos Que Se Apague" (2010) | "Frío" (2011) |

50 Cent singles chronology
| "Down on Me" (2010) | "No Dejemos Que Se Apague" (2010) | "Here We Go Again" (2010) |

T-Pain singles chronology
| "Rap Song" (2010) | "No Dejemos Que Se Apague" (2010) | "Welcome to My Hood" (2011) |

"No Dejemos Que Se Apague" (English: We Can't Let It End) is Wisin & Yandel's lead single from the album Los Vaqueros: El Regreso, released on December 21, 2010. It features American rapper 50 Cent and American singer T-Pain. This is the second time that the duo has worked with 50 Cent and the second time working with T-Pain on a song.

== Music video ==
=== Development ===
The music video for the song was filmed in October 2010. It was directed by Jessy Terrero, premiered through their website on December 17, 2010. The music video shows similarity to Lil Wayne's music video for "Got Money" which also features T-Pain, although the video is based on the movie The Town.

=== Synopsis ===
The video starts with a man (Adam Rodriguez), later to be known to be a worker of 50 Cent, calling from Los Angeles, California to San Juan, Puerto Rico where Yandel is. It is a job offering when at first he rejects but 50 Cent convinces him. Then it shows that 50 Cent is a common person in a bank and that's where the song starts. Later it is shown that Yandel, with Wisin, in a car driving to the bank. Then they rob the bank with T-Pain. They take a hostage which Yandel is found for. They take her to a van and blindfold the girl. They leave her somewhere and she is questioned by the police. Wisin, Yandel, 50 Cent & T-Pain, with money bags, are shown walking away from the van that they blew up. Later the same girl has memories of Yandel in a laundry shop where she drops her laundry she reaches for it, but then someone else also reaches for it, it is Yandel. The Music video ends showing that the music video was a music video itself.
