= East Coast hip-hop =

Regional subgenre of hip-hop

- Stylistic origins: Hip-hop; funk; disco; R&B; jazz; blues
- Cultural origins: August 11, 1973, The Bronx, New York City, U.S.
- Derivative forms: Boom bap; jazz rap; gangsta rap; mafioso rap; golden age hip-hop; alternative hip-hop; hardcore hip-hop; underground hip-hop; rap rock; rap metal; Brooklyn drill; Bronx drill

Fusion genres
- New jack swing; Jersey club; Baltimore club

Regional scenes
- New York; New Jersey; Pennsylvania; Connecticut; Massachusetts; Rhode Island; Vermont; New Hampshire; Maine; Washington, D.C.; Delaware; Maryland; Virginia (sometimes included)

Other topics
- West Coast hip-hop; East Coast–West Coast hip-hop rivalry; list of hip-hop musicians from New York City

East Coast hip-hop is a regional subgenre of hip-hop music that originated in New York City during the 1970s. Hip-hop is recognized to have originated and evolved first in the Bronx borough of New York City. In contrast to other styles, East Coast hip-hop music prioritizes complex lyrics for attentive listening rather than beats for dancing. The term "East Coast hip-hop" more specifically denotes hip-hop originating from the Northeastern United States. Southeastern states such as Georgia or Florida instead produce Southern hip-hop rather than East Coast hip-hop, although the District of Columbia, Virginia, and Maryland produce East Coast hip-hop.

== Musical style ==
Example
A sample of an East Coast hip-hop song, highlighting an emphasis on lyricism, as well as displaying boom bap and jazz rap elements. The song played on the background is "The Choice Is Yours (Revisited)" by Black Sheep.

In contrast to the more simplistic rhyme pattern and scheme used in Old-school hip-hop, hip-hop in the late 1980s developed a stronger emphasis on lyrical dexterity. It also became characterized by multi-syllabic rhymes, complex wordplay, a continuous free-flowing delivery and intricate metaphors. Although East Coast hip-hop can vary in sound and style, "aggressive" beats and the combining of samples were common to the subgenre in the mid- to late 1980s.

The aggressive and hard-hitting beats of the form were emphasized by such acts as EPMD, Beastie Boys and Public Enemy, while artists such as Rakim, Boogie Down Productions, LL Cool J, Big Daddy Kane, Nas, The Notorious B.I.G., and Slick Rick were noted for their lyrical skill. Lyrical themes throughout the history of East Coast hip-hop have ranged from lyrical consciousness by such artists as Public Enemy and A Tribe Called Quest to Mafioso rap themes by rappers such as Raekwon, MF Grimm and Kool G Rap.

== History ==
=== 1973–1986: Emergence ===
East Coast hip-hop is occasionally referred to as New York rap due to its origins and development at block parties thrown in New York City during the 1970s. According to AllMusic, "At the dawn of the hip-hop era, all rap was East Coast rap." Leading up to hip-hop, there were spoken-word artists such as the Last Poets who released their debut album in 1970, and Gil Scott-Heron, who gained a wide audience with his 1971 track "The Revolution Will Not Be Televised". These artists combined spoken word and music to create a kind of "proto-rap" vibe. Following this, early artists of hip-hop such as DJ Kool Herc, Grandmaster Flash, Afrika Bambaataa, the Sugarhill Gang, Kurtis Blow, Jam Master Jay and Run-DMC, pioneered East Coast hip-hop during hip-hop's earlier years in the 1970s and 1980s.

=== 1986–1997: Renaissance ===
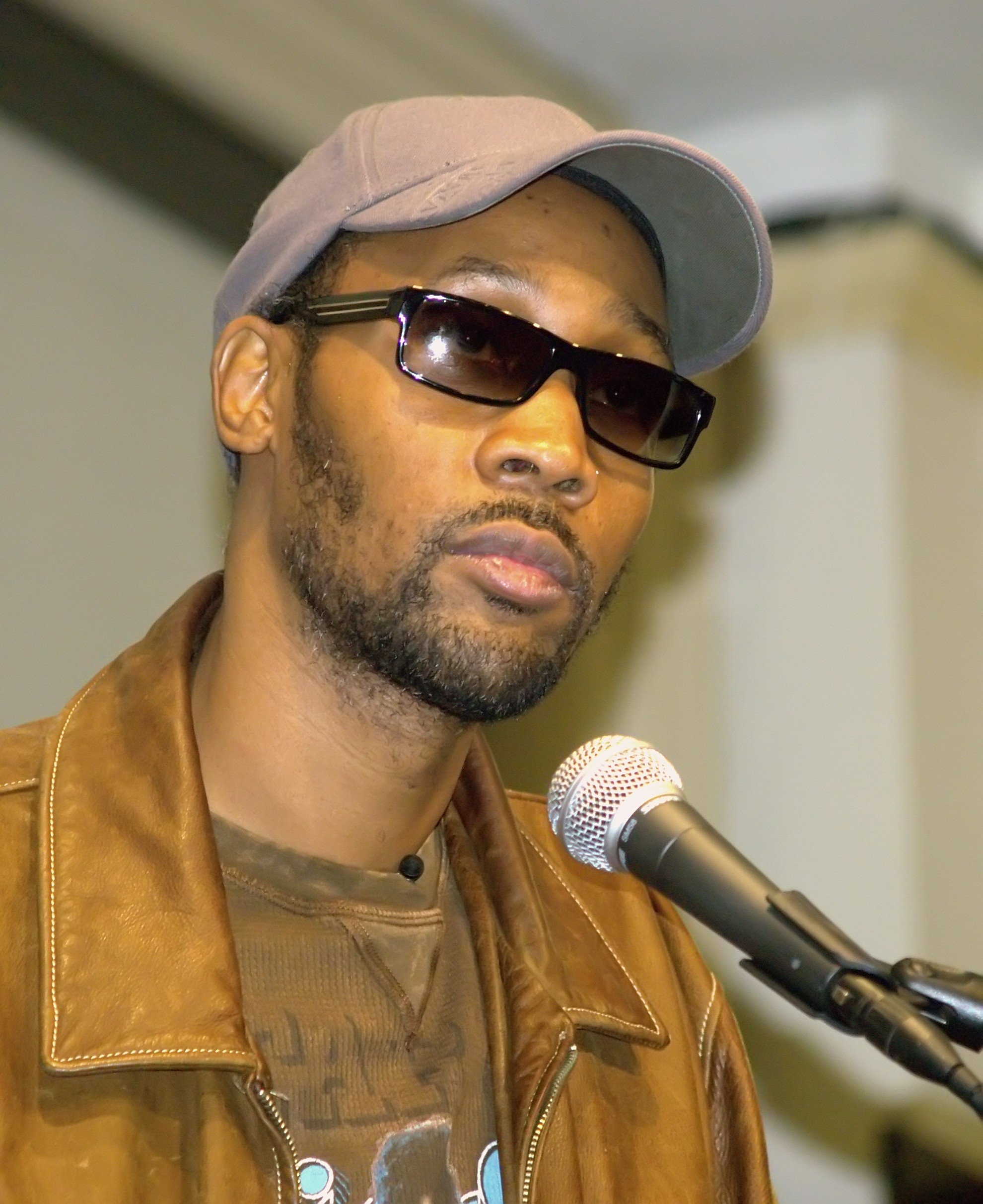
RZA, producer and member of the Wu-Tang Clan

As the genre developed, lyrical themes evolved through the work of East Coast artists such as the Native Tongues, a collective of hip-hop artists associated with generally positive, Afrocentric themes, and assembled by Afrika Bambaataa. New York–based groups such as De La Soul, Public Enemy, A Tribe Called Quest, and the Jungle Brothers also earned recognition for their musical eclecticism. This period from the mid-1980s to mid-1990s has been called the "golden age" of hip-hop. Although East Coast hip-hop was more popular throughout the late 1980s, N.W.A's Straight Outta Compton (released in early 1989) presented the toughened sound of West Coast hip-hop, which was accompanied by gritty, street-level subject matter. Later in 1992, Dr. Dre's G-funk record The Chronic would introduce West Coast hip-hop to the mainstream. Along with a combined ability to keep its primary function as party music, the West Coast form of hip-hop became a dominant force during the early 1990s. Although G-Funk was the most popular variety of hip-hop during the early 1990s, the East Coast hip-hop scene remained an integral part of the music industry. During this period, several New York City rappers rising from the local underground scene, began releasing noteworthy albums in the early and mid-1990s, such as Nas, The Notorious B.I.G. and others. The Stretch Armstrong and Bobbito Show was the launch pad for many East Coast rappers during this era.

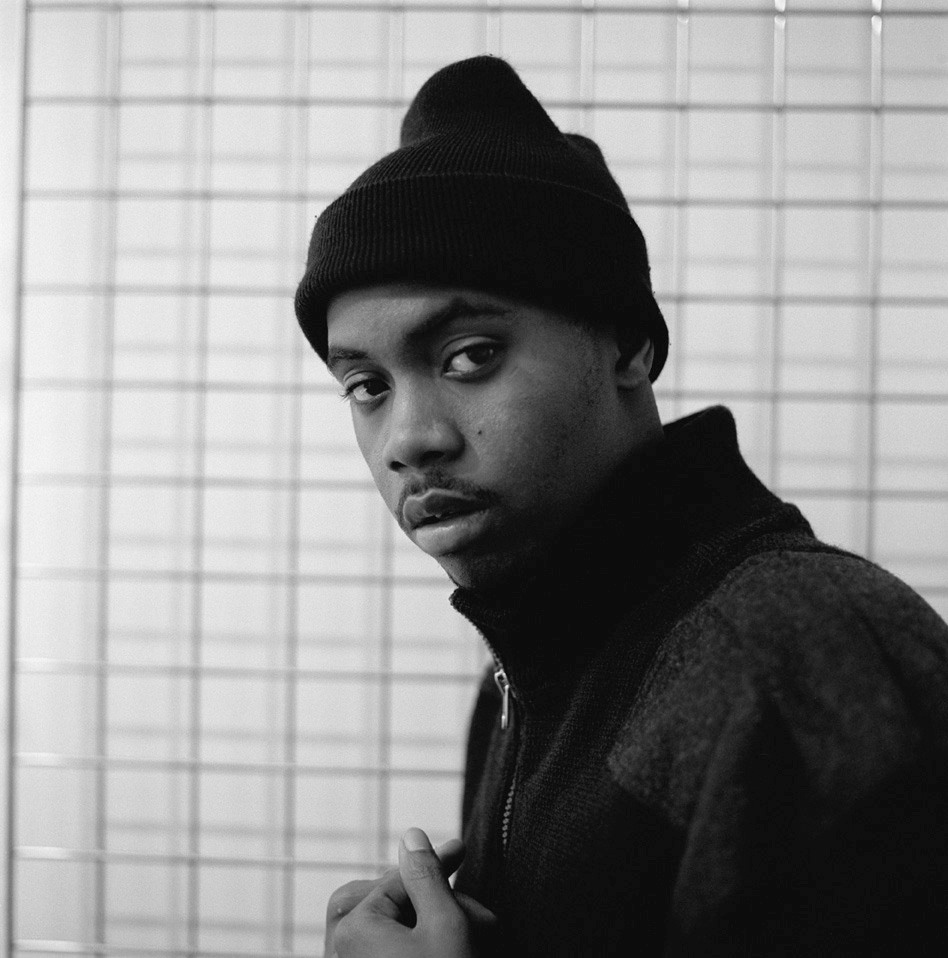
Nas's 1994 debut album Illmatic was critically acclaimed.

Nas' 1994 debut album Illmatic has also been noted as one of the creative high points of the East Coast hip-hop scene, and featured production from such renowned New York–based producers as Large Professor, Pete Rock and DJ Premier. Meanwhile, The Wu-Tang Clan, Onyx, Black Moon, Smif-N-Wessun, Big L, Lost Boyz and Mobb Deep became pillars in New York's hardcore hip-hop scene, achieving widespread critical acclaim for their landmark albums, Enter the Wu-Tang (36 Chambers) (1993), Lifestylez ov da Poor & Dangerous (1995), Enta da Stage (1993), Bacdafucup (1993), Dah Shinin' (1995), Legal Drug Money (1996) and The Infamous (1995).

The Notorious B.I.G. became the central figure in East Coast hip-hop during most of the 1990s. Bad Boy Records comprised a team of producers known as the Hitmen Stevie J, Derrick "D Dot" Angelletie and Amen Ra directed by Sean Combs to move the focus on hip-hop to New York with the Notorious B.I.G.'s Billboard topping hits. His success on the music charts and rise to the mainstream drew more attention to New York at the time of West Coast hip-hop's dominance. According to AllMusic editor Steve Huey, the success of his 1994 debut album Ready to Die "reinvented East Coast rap for the gangsta age" and "turned the Notorious B.I.G. into a hip-hop sensation — the first major star the East Coast had produced since the rise of Dr. Dre's West Coast G-funk". Many saw his dominating presence as a catalyzing factor in the East Coast–West Coast hip-hop rivalry that polarized much of the hip-hop community, stirring the issue enough to result in the Brooklyn rapper's 1997 death, as well as his West Coast counterpart, Tupac Shakur, months prior. By the late 1990s, East Coast rap had returned to mainstream dominance.

=== 1997–2007: Bling era, mainstream success ===
Biggie's commercial success helped pave the way for the success of other up-and-coming East Coast rappers such as Jay-Z, DMX, Busta Rhymes, 50 Cent, Ja Rule, the Lox, Fat Joe, Big Pun, and Clipse. Many East Coast hip-hop producers also rose to prominence during this period such as Timbaland, Pharrell, Just Blaze, Swizz Beatz, Irv Gotti, and 7 Aurelius (Note: Although not from the East Coast, 7 Aurelius' career originated in New York and consists almost exclusively of east coast hip hop and R&B production.).

=== 2007–2013: Blog era and revitalization ===
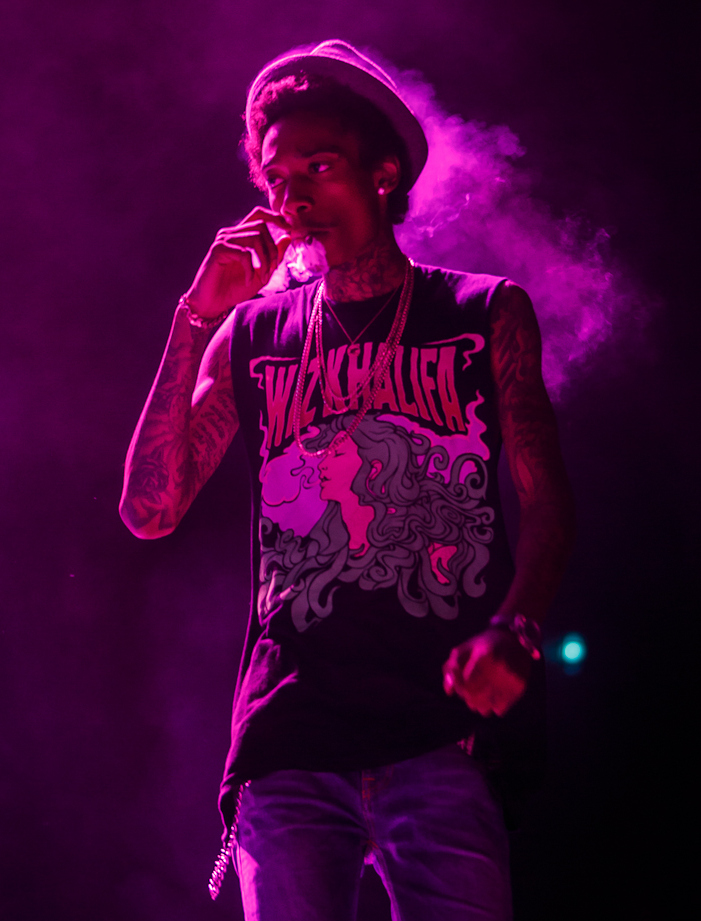
Wiz Khalifa performing in Toronto in 2012.

A mainstream revitalization of East Coast rap occurred in the late 2000s and early 2010s, albeit without the same level of ubiquity as in the 1990s. Younger artists at this time used Internet resources such as social media, blogging, and music streaming to build a following among fans, blurring the lines between the underground and the mainstream. Rappers who emerged during this "blog era" include Joey Bada$$, A$AP Rocky, Nicki Minaj, Wiz Khalifa, Meek Mill, French Montana, Pusha T, Logic, Mac Miller, Vast Aire, Wale, Azealia Banks, Flatbush Zombies, Troy Ave, Bishop Nehru, Asher Roth, and Ka.

=== 2014–present: Rise of trap, drill, boom-bap resurgence ===
East Coast rappers that saw success during this period include Cardi B, Lil Uzi Vert, Fetty Wap, A Boogie wit da Hoodie, Rich The Kid, Tekashi 6ix9ine, Sheck Wes, ASAP Ferg, Rico Nasty, Young M.A, Action Bronson, Shy Glizzy, YBN Cordae, Brent Faiyaz, GoldLink, PnB Rock, Flipp Dinero, and Jay Critch. Many of the rappers of this era gained prominence on social media, and some diverged from the traditional East Coast sound with stylistic choices that befitted the streaming era, such as trap production and Southern hip-hop influence. Various factors led to a decline in unique regional scenes, including East Coast rap, and rivalries between different cities and regions declined significantly, with artists across different regions and genres more willing to collaborate than in the past.

BK's drill genre, heavily influenced by UK drill (and often using the same London producers, such as 808Melo), has injected new energy into the New York hip-hop scene, attracting critical acclaim, media controversy and a significant following, despite departing from standard hip-hop song structures. The genre started in Brooklyn, led by artists such as Bobby Shmurda, the late Pop Smoke, Fivio Foreign, Sheff G, and 22Gz. Bronx drill, a related subgenre, has also emerged, with prominent rappers including Kay Flock, Ice Spice and Kenzo B.

A neo-mafioso style of East Coast rap, marked by an emphasis on "grimy" gangster lyricism, wordplay, and boom-bap production, reminiscent of "classic" mid-90's acts such as "Wu-Tang, Mobb Deep, Onyx, and early Jay-Z", has made an emergence, garnering critical and commercial success, and a cult following. This modern revitalization of the traditional sound (sometimes referred to as "coke rap") has been spearheaded by Griselda Records of Buffalo, upstate New York, and its flagship artists Westside Gunn, Benny the Butcher, and Conway the Machine, as well as affiliated artists Mach-Hommy, Roc Marciano, Boldy James, Rome Streetz, Armani Caesar, Daringer and Conductor Williams, among others.

== Legacy ==
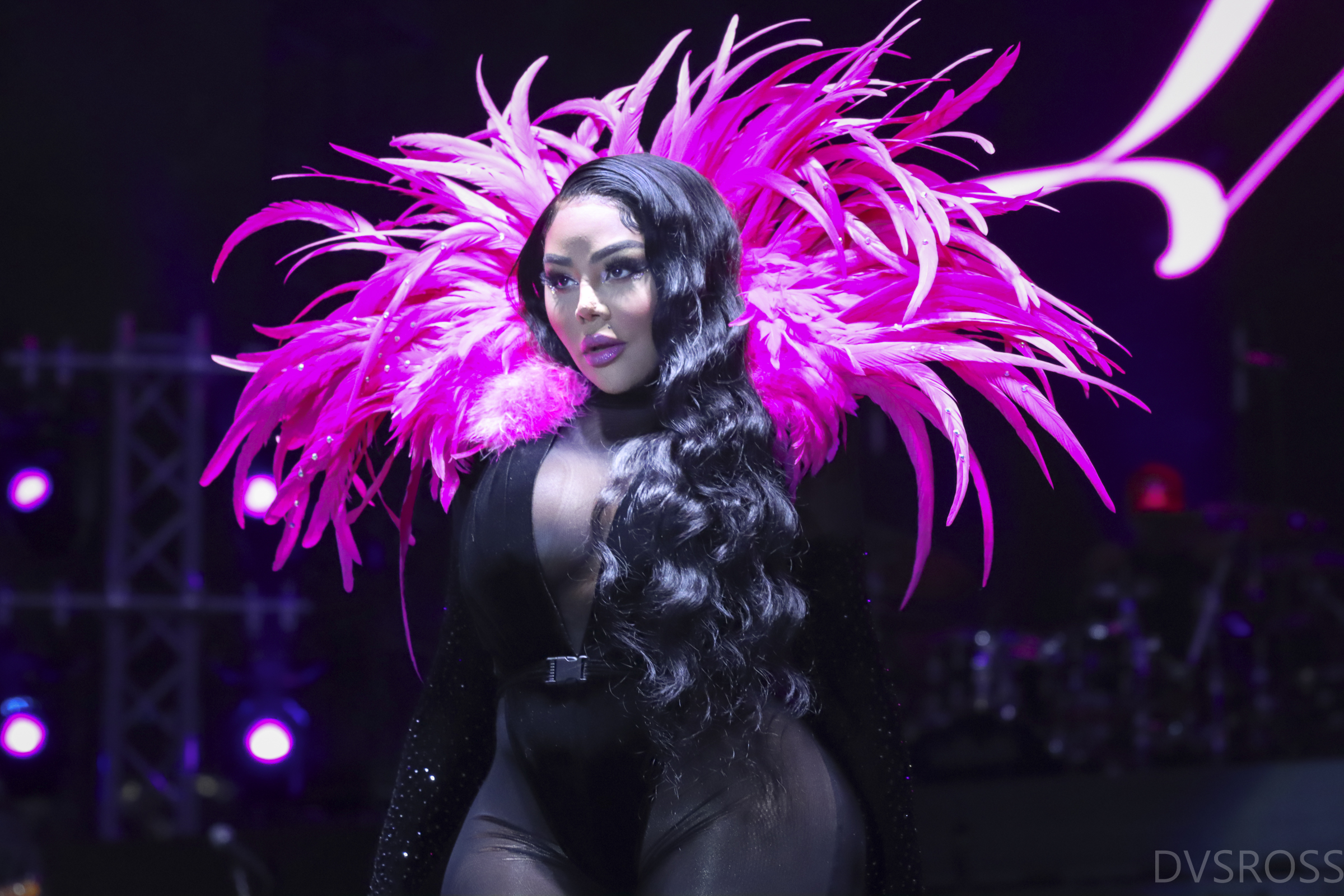
Lil Kim's fourth studio album The Naked Truth is the only album by a female rapper to have received five mics from The Source for its outstanding lyrical performance. Lil Kim performs at a pride parade in Los Angeles in 2022 above.

East Coast hip-hop was the dominant form of rap music during the Golden Era of hip-hop. Many knowledgeable hip-hop fans and critics are particularly favorable towards East Coast hip-hop of the early-mid 1990s, viewing it as a time of creative growth and influential recordings, and describing it as "The East Coast Renaissance". Music writer May Blaize of MVRemix Urban comments on the nostalgia felt among hip-hop fans for records released during this time:

It was claimed as the East Coast Renaissance. Wu-Tang brought the ruckus with 36 Chambers. The world was ours when Nas released Illmatic. Big L, (The MVP) came out with Lifestylez ov da Poor and Dangerous. Temperatures rose in clubs when Mobb Deep came out with The Infamous and Brooklyn's finest Jay-Z released Reasonable Doubt. . . And who can forget the powerful uplifting anthem that would brand New York's concrete "Bucktown" (Smif-n-Wessun's hit single)? . . .Ahh, it was a beautiful time in hip-hop history that many of us wish we could return to.

David Drake of Stylus Magazine writes of hip-hop during 1994 and its contributions, stating: "The beats were hot, the rhymes were hot – it really was an amazing time for hip-hop and music in general. This was the critical point for the East Coast, a time when rappers from the New York area were releasing bucketloads of thrilling work – Digable Planets, Gang Starr, Pete Rock, Jeru, O.C., Organized Konfusion – I mean, this was a year of serious music."

East Coast hip-hop has also produced a multitude of acclaimed female rappers, including Salt and Pepa, The Real Roxanne, Monie Love, Queen Latifah, Lil Kim, Lauryn Hill, Ladybug Mecca, Foxy Brown, Charli Baltimore, Eve, Missy Elliott, Angie Martinez, Remy Ma, Lil Mama, Nicki Minaj, Cardi B, Rapsody, Young M.A, BIA, Armani Caesar, Ice Spice, and Coi Leray.

== See also ==
- Music of New York
- Music of New York City
- Culture of New York City
- Music of New Jersey
- Music of Pennsylvania
- Music of Connecticut
- Music of Massachusetts
- Music of Rhode Island
- Music of New Hampshire
- Music of Vermont
- Music of Maine
- Music of Delaware
- Music of Maryland
- Music of Washington, D.C.
- Music of Virginia
- East Coast–West Coast hip-hop rivalry
- List of East Coast hip-hop record labels
- Stretch and Bobbito: Radio That Changed Lives
