= Pauly D =

American DJ and television personality

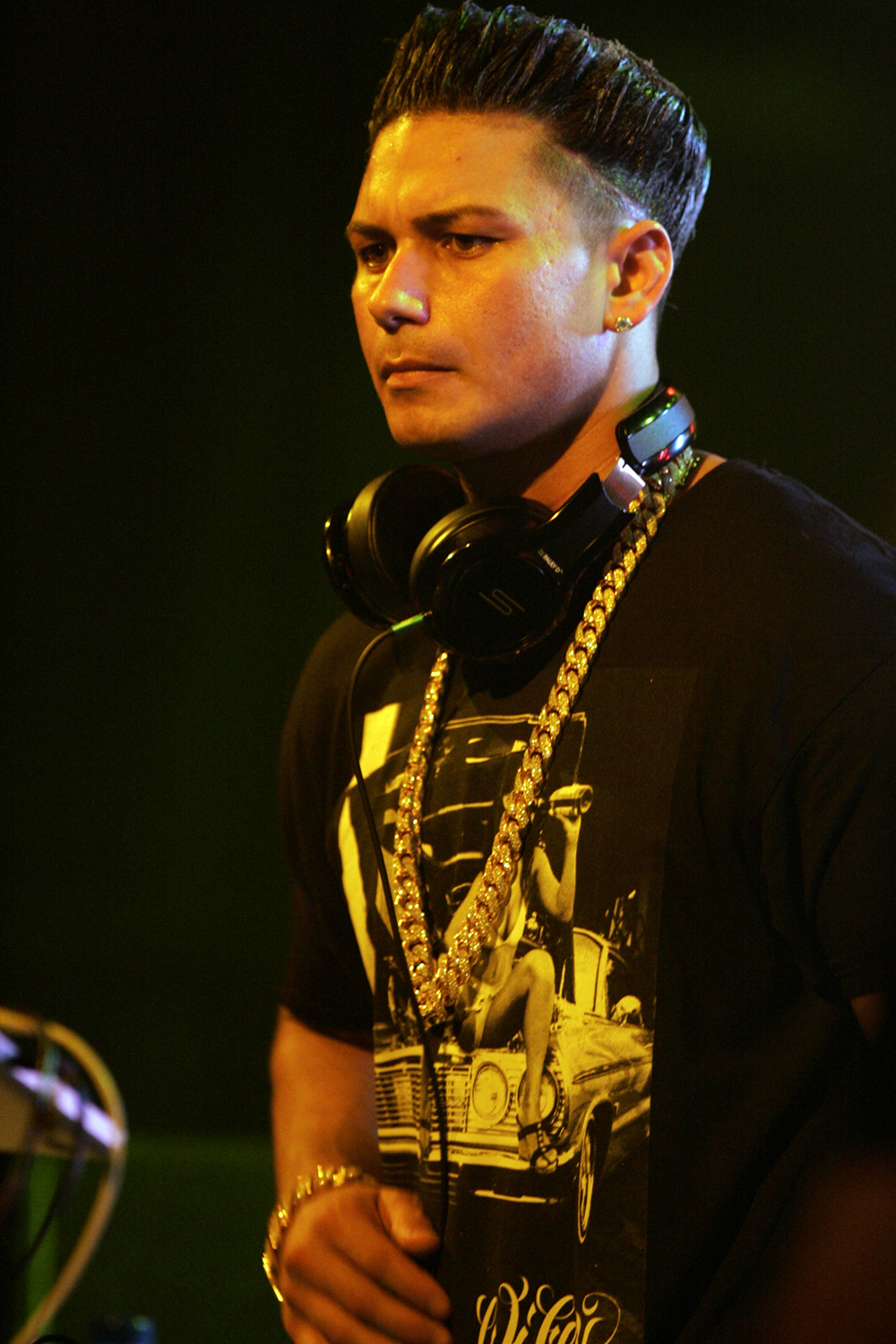
- Pauly D in 2013

Background information
- Also known as: DJ Pauly D
- Born: Paul Michael DelVecchio Jr. July 5, 1980 (age 46); Providence, Rhode Island, U.S.
- Genre: Dance
- Occupations: Television personality; DJ
- Years active: 2009–present
- Labels: G-Note; G-Unit; EMI
- Partner(s): Nikki Hall (2020–present; engaged)
- Website: djpaulyd.com

Paul Michael DelVecchio Jr. (born July 5, 1980), known as Pauly D and DJ Pauly D, is an American television personality and DJ. He is best known for being a cast member of MTV's reality show Jersey Shore.

In 2011, he made a three-album deal with 50 Cent's G-Unit Records and G-Note Records. He is the first of the Jersey Shore cast to get his own spin-off show, The Pauly D Project.

== Early life ==
DelVecchio was born on July 5, 1980, in Providence, Rhode Island. He is the son of Donna DiCarlo and Paul D. DelVecchio Sr. He has said that he is of "100% Italian" descent. He has one sister, Vanessa. He began his career as a local DJ under the moniker Pauly D. One of his professional idols was DJ AM.

== Career ==
=== Jersey Shore ===
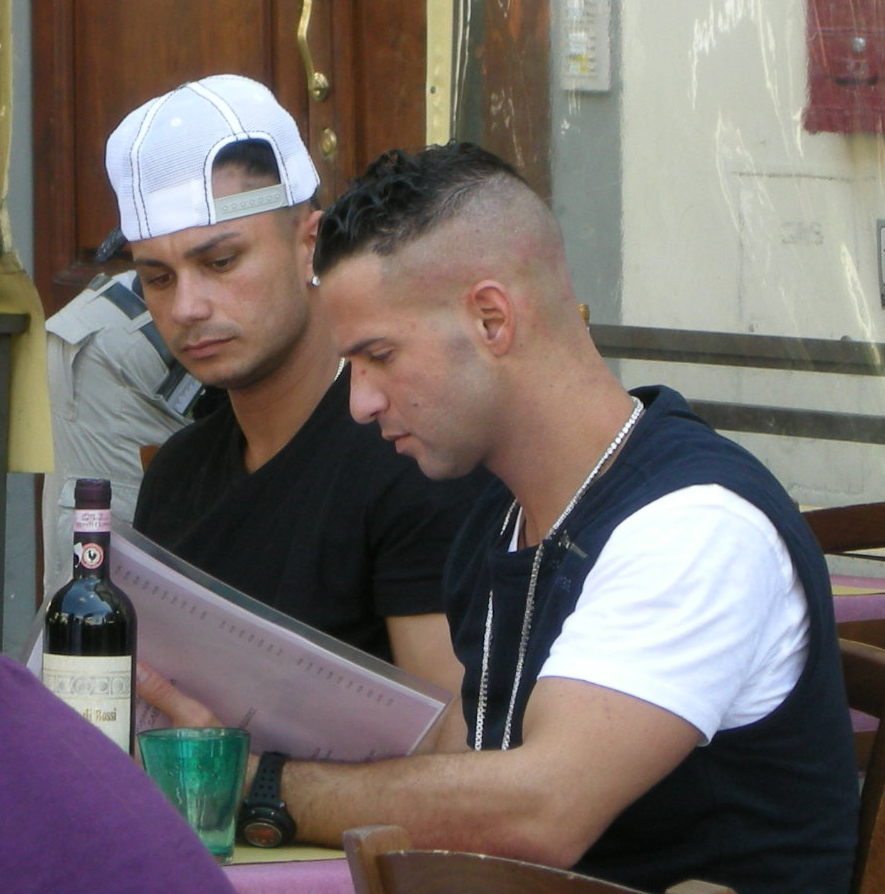
DelVecchio (left) with Jersey Shore cast member Michael Sorrentino, 2011

DelVecchio was cast in 2009 for Jersey Shore. He has stated that him being chosen for Jersey Shore had nothing to do with his music, but that they instead sent him a Myspace message after liking his look. After he sent them his number, "The casting directors called me from LA and they said they wanted to send down a camera crew to Rhode Island to film a day in my life. They filmed me at the gym, filmed me tanning and filmed me going to the club. Six months later they said I got on the show. I never really auditioned."

His appearance in the show resulted in popularity with what Time dubbed "seriously rabid fans." He won the 2011 Teen Choice Award for Choice Reality Star: Male.

=== The Pauly D Project ===
DelVecchio is the first housemate from Jersey Shore to receive his own spin-off. The show focused on his DJ career as he goes on a tour around America. Filming commenced in 2012. According to Time, "We're guessing Pauly D got the spot [instead of Nicole Polizzi or Michael Sorrentino] because he genuinely seems fun and easy to get along with. He's not known for diva antics like The Situation and doesn't appear a drunken mess at times, like Nicole and Michael do." The show, originally called DelVecchio was later renamed The Pauly D Project. It premiered on MTV on March 29, 2012.

=== Music and disc jockey career ===
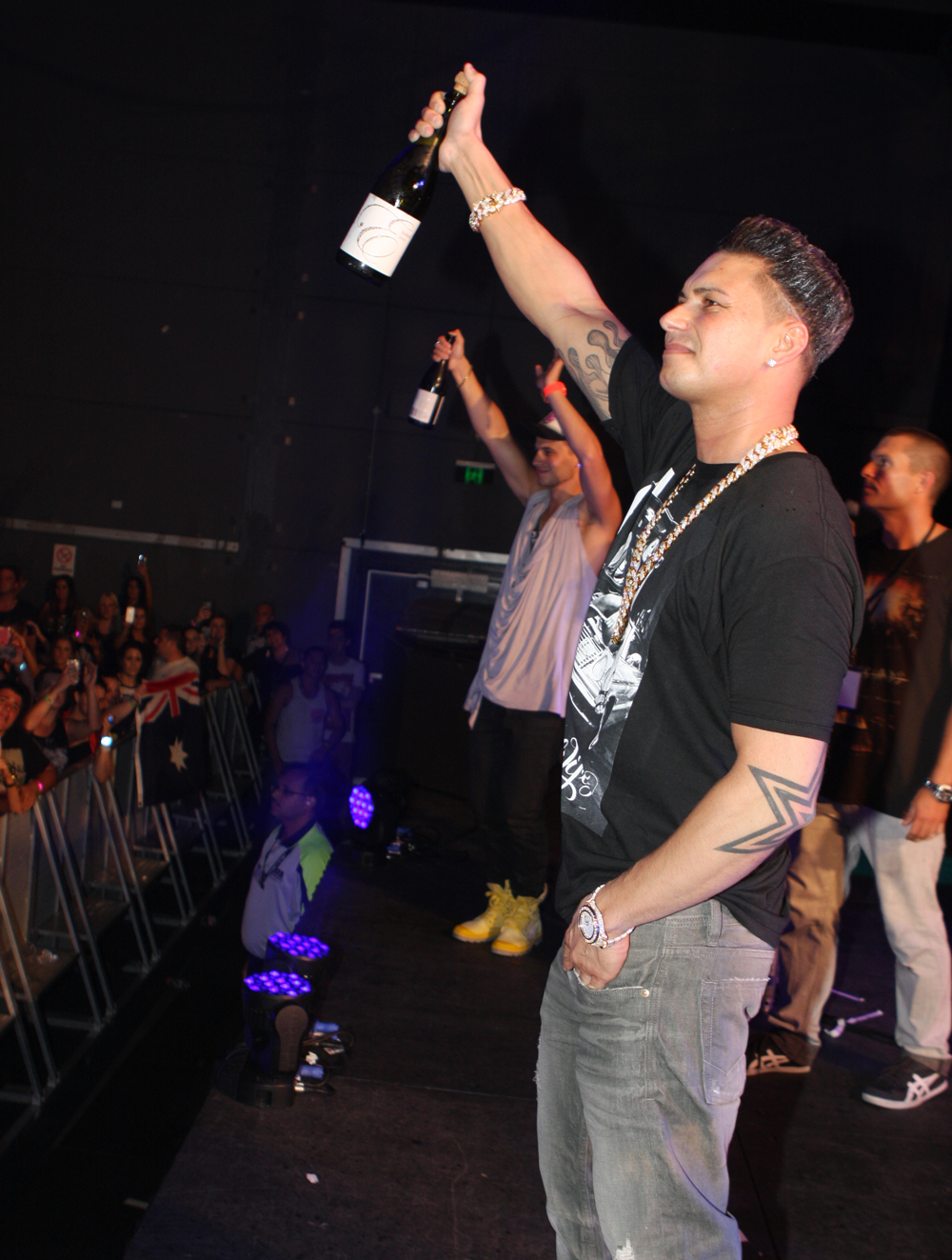
DelVecchio on stage in 2013

In 2010, DelVecchio released a single, "Beat Dat Beat (It's Time To)". He was also nominated for the "America's Best DJ" competition in 2010 and 2011.

After numerous rumors, on August 11, 2011, DelVecchio confirmed to XXL that he had signed a three-album deal with 50 Cent's labels G-Unit Records & G-Note Records and that he will also be releasing headphones under the label. Also that year, DelVecchio announced that he would open for Britney Spears on her Femme Fatale Tour in North America in selected cities.

In July 2012, DelVecchio tweeted that Big Sean was with him in the studio working on his new album, which will be released in 2013. In August, Wrestling Inc. reported that DelVecchio would be the social media ambassador for SummerSlam.

DelVecchio released the first single of his debut album, called "Back to Love", on January 15, 2013, featuring British singer Jay Sean. In 2016, DelVecchio released a single called "Did You Know" with Tdot illdude.On April 5, 2019, DelVecchio released his third single called "Silver & Gold" with James Kaye.

=== Other reality television appearances ===
In June 2012, DelVecchio was a contestant on the Fox show called The Choice. In 2016, DelVecchio joined the cast of Famously Single on the E! network. The show follows eight single celebrities who move in together to examine their romantic problems. In 2018, he joined the cast Marriage Bootcamp: Reality Stars 11 with Aubrey O'Day, whom he first met while filming Famously Single. Also in 2018, DelVecchio rejoined the Jersey Shore castmates for the show's sequel series, Jersey Shore: Family Vacation. The series ran from 2018 to 2026.

In 2019, DelVecchio was part of the cast of Game of Clones, a dating show where he was looking for a Megan Fox lookalike. In April 2019, DelVecchio appeared on the MTV reality dating series Double Shot at Love, along with Jersey Shore castmate Vinny Guadagnino.

In 2020, DelVecchio and Vinny Guadagnino were cast on another MTV reality series, Revenge Prank. In 2022, DelVecchio served as the official narrator for the reality party-competition series All Star Shore on Paramount+.

== Personal life ==
In October 2013, DelVecchio announced that he fathered a daughter, Amabella Sophia, born in New Jersey.

On September 27, 2026, DelVecchio engaged influencer Nikki Hall after six years of dating.

== Discography ==
=== Singles ===
Year	Title	Peak chart positions	Album
Year	Title	UK	Album
2012	"Night of My Life" (featuring Dash)	—	TBA
2013	"Back to Love" (featuring Jay Sean)	113	TBA
2019	"Silver & Gold" (featuring James Kaye)	—	TBA
"—" denotes single that did not chart or was not released

== Awards and nominations ==
Year	Association	Category	Result
2010	Teen Choice Awards	Choice TV: Male Reality Star	Nominated
2011	Teen Choice Awards	Choice TV: Male Reality Star	Won
2012	Teen Choice Awards	Choice TV: Male Reality Star	Won
