= G-Note Records =

American record label

- Parent company: G-Unit Records
- Founded: 2010
- Founder: 50 Cent
- Distributor: G-Unit Records
- Genre: Pop, dance, R&B
- Country of origin: United States
- Location: New York, New York

G-Note Records is a subsidiary record label of 50 Cent's G-Unit Records. The label was formed in late 2010 for pop, dance and R&B artists. The offices for the label are in New York.

== Origins (2010) ==
After the success of former G-Unit subsidiary label "G-Unit South,"G-Unit Philly, and "G-Unit West, 50 Cent decided to create another subsidiary in 2009. Unlike the two other subsidiary labels, G-Note Records is a Hip hop based label including Pop, Dance and R&B music. The label was founded in late 2010 with the first two artists signed, Governor and Hot Rod. The first official music that was released under the label was Hot Rod's first single called Dance With Me. It was believed that 50 Cent intended to sign more acts to the label in the upcoming year, including R&B singer Jovan Dais who was featured on the original version of his single "Baby By Me", Zimbabwean singer Gamu Nhengu, and singer Jeremih who he has recently worked on a couple of projects with. The second single released on the label was Governor's, the song was called "Here We Go Again" and featured 50 Cent. In an interview with G-Unit Radio 50 Cent said he created the label because

"There was a gap in the market, the group G-Unit had a distinctive aggressive style and so also everyone on the label's style was expected to be aggressive. It also is a platform for artist's to make all different styles of music".

In late April 2011, it was reported that 50 Cent was in talks with DJ Pauly D about signing to the label for a three-album deal. This was later confirmed by DJ Whoo Kid in an interview with Shade 45. In the beginning of December 2011, DJ Pauly D was officially signed to G-Note Records. Lea was dropped from the label at the top of 2013.

== Roster ==
=== Current artists ===
Act	Year signed	Albums under the label
DJ Pauly D	2011	Pumitzvah

=== Former Artists ===
Act	Years on the label	Albums under the label
Lea Sunshine	2011–2014	-Miss me single
Hot Rod (rapper)	2006-2014	-HandsDown
Governor (singer)	2009-2013	Touch of Magic

== Discography ==
=== Upcoming releases ===
List of upcoming studio album releases
Artist	Details
DJ Pauly D	Title: Untitled; Release date: TBA
