= Gio Washington =

American singer (born 1983)

- Also known as: Country Boy, Gentleman G, Governor
- Born: Governor Washington Jr. May 9, 1983 (age 43); Charles City, Virginia, U.S.
- Genres: R&B, soul
- Occupations: Singer, songwriter
- Years active: 2000–present
- Labels: Charles City Music (current); G-Note Records, G-Unit Records, Grand Hustle Records, Atlantic Records, Warlock Records (former)
- Website: governormusic.com

Governor Washington Jr. (born May 9, 1983), known professionally as Gio Washington (formerly Governor), is an American R&B and soul singer from Charles City, Virginia. He was initially signed to T.I.'s Grand Hustle imprint, under the aegis of Atlantic Records. In 2010, he signed to the newly formed G-Note Records, a subsidiary label of 50 Cent's G-Unit Records.

== Life and career ==
=== 1983–2004: Early life and career beginnings ===
Governor Washington Jr. was born on July 25, 1983 in Charles City County, Virginia. His father was a preacher. After declining an offer to attend the Berklee College of Music, he formed the Jodeci-style R&B group, Case Closed, where he performed under the moniker Country Boy. After moving to New York City, then back to Virginia, Washington left the group and returned to New York. When the group disbanded, he tried to make it on its own. Warlock Records eventually signed Washington and released his debut album Another State Of Mind, in 2000.

At that time he met the influential music executives and production team, Trackmasters, while he changed his style from R&B to hip-hop. 50 Cent was signed to the Trackmasters at that time as well, and Washington and 50 Cent recorded about six songs for a prospective album called Best of Both Worlds, which was never released. After the split-up with Trackmasters in 2002, Washington met Wyclef Jean, who helped him sign a deal with Atlantic Records. He even made a dozen songs with Dr. Dre, for his debut album on Atlantic, but frictions between Dre's Aftermath and Atlantic, made those songs never see the light of the day.

=== 2005–2006: Grand Hustle signing and Son of Pain ===
In 2005, American rapper T.I. added Washington, to his Grand Hustle Records imprint, after Atlantic Records chose T.I. to act as his mentor. Atlantic Records' plan for Washington, who joined Atlantic's roster almost four years prior, was to market him a devotee, or a card-carrying member of T.I.'s "camp.". Atlantic first tried to pair him with renowned record producer Dr. Dre, and then with gangsta rapper 50 Cent; however both plans fell through. In search of quick jolt of street credibility, the label brokered a deal for the singer to join T.I.'s imprint. In 2006, Washington appeared alongside T.I., performing the song "Hello", from T.I.'s album King, for the Atlanta-based rapper's AOL Sessions. After appearing on several of Grand Hustle'resident disc jockey, DJ Drama's Gangsta Grillz mixtapes, Washington later released his Grand Hustle/Atlantic debut, titled Son of Pain, in September 2006. The album's production was handled by Just Blaze, Scott Storch, Wyclef Jean and Raphael Saadiq, among others. The album debuted at number 50 on the US Billboard Top R&B/Hip-Hop Albums.

=== 2009–present: G-Unit signing ===
After signing to G-Unit Records in 2009, Washington was signed to the newly formed subsidiary G-Note Records, where he released the first single off his upcoming album. He had this to say about signing with the label,

The new situation is an honor in itself. 50 and I grew up together in this music, so to speak. I hate to even give names sometimes dealing with my story because I hate to even give some of the haters light by mentioning their names. Regardless of any of that, it was a blessing to be able to re-connect to 50. We always shared a genuine respect for each others music and destiny had it so that we end up being able to work with each other again. The sweet thing about this situation on G-Note is that it's an independent label, with major money behind it. It's not like being on a major for me. On G-Note, I don't have to deal with certain issues that come along with being attached to a major. I actually talk to the owner of the company, ride in the same vehicle on the way to the airport. I have his telephone number and he actually answers….I don't have the pressure of selling 2 million records to actually make a profit.

The song is called "Here We Go Again" and features 50 Cent. The song will be released for digital download on December 27, 2010. In an interview with G-Unit Radio, 50 Cent said that Washington was "extremely talented" and that "he is about to blow". Along with releasing his first single, "Here We Go Again" off his upcoming album, Washington reported that he was working on mixtapes as well as putting out new music on thisis50.com regularly to promote his album.

In an interview with HipHopNMore, Washington revealed the title for his upcoming album which is called, A Touch of Magic. The album will be released under G-Note Records and was initially scheduled for a summer 2011 release date. Washington also spoke about upcoming music with 50 Cent on the album and had this to say, "The first two or three collaborations was to allow people to get used to a particular feel and sound, while being connected to one of the most successful rappers on earth. Now, we are focusing on releasing songs that showcase that sound, speaking of myself as a solo artist".

In 2013, Washington began performing under the pseudonym, Gio Washington. In March 2015, Washington and 50 Cent reunited on a song titled "Annie", recorded for the 50 Cent executive produced Starz series, Power.

== Personal life ==
Washington was seriously injured in a vehicle accident on the night of August 8, 2015. The accident catapulted Washington from his vehicle, leaving him with a collapsed lung, broken ribs and internal injuries.

== Discography ==
=== Studio albums ===
Title	Album details	Peak chart positions	
Title	Album details	US Heat	US R&B
Another State of Mind	Released: June 6, 2000; Label: Warlock Records; Formats: CD, cassette, digital download	—	—
Son of Pain	Release: September 12, 2006; Label: Grand Hustle Records, Atlantic Records; Formats: CD, digital download	44	50
Illumination	Release: May 27, 2015; Label: Charles City Music; Formats: Digital download	—	—

=== Singles ===
Song	Year	Album
"Blood, Sweat & Tears"	2006	Son of Pain
"Here We Go Again" (featuring 50 Cent)	2010	—N/a
"On and On"	2014	—N/a

=== Guest appearances ===
List of non-single guest appearances, with other performing artists, showing year released and album name
Title	Year	Other performer(s)	Album
"PJ's"	2002	Wyclef Jean, Prolific	Masquerade
"Since Supernatural"	2002	Santana, Melkie Jean	Shaman
"The World"	2002	G-Unit	God's Plan
"Can't Fuck with Queen Bee"	2003	Lil' Kim, Shelene Thomas with Full Force	La Bella Mafia
"Hustlin' "	2004	T.I.	Urban Legend
"Hello"	2006	T.I.	King
"Destiny"	2006	none	Grand Hustle Presents: In da Streetz Volume 4
"Ooh Oh"	2006	P$C	The Indictment
"Do You Think About Me"	2009	50 Cent	Before I Self Destruct
"They Burned Me"	2010	50 Cent	—N/a
"Kill It"	2010	Lloyd Banks	H.F.M. 2 (The Hunger for More 2)
"When It All Goes Down"	2011	50 Cent	—N/a
"Ring on You"	2015	Bishup Bicardi	TBA
"Baby That's Me"	2018	High Defynition	Nothing Is By Chance
