= Baby by Me =

Single by 50 Cent featuring Ne-Yo

from the album Before I Self Destruct
- Released: September 10, 2009
- Genre: Hip-hop; R&B
- Length: 3:33
- Label: Aftermath; Shady; Interscope; Universal
- Songwriters: Curtis Jackson; Jamal Jones; Shaffer Smith
- Producers: Polow Da Don; William Tyler

50 Cent singles chronology
"Mujeres in the Club" (2009)	"Baby by Me" (2009)	"Do You Think About Me" (2010)

Ne-Yo singles chronology
"Be on You" (2009)	"Baby by Me" (2009)	"Never Knew I Needed" (2009)

"Baby by Me" is a song by American rapper 50 Cent, released on September 10, 2009 as the lead single from his fourth studio album, Before I Self Destruct. The song was produced by Polow da Don and contains a guest appearance from American R&B singer Ne-Yo, who sings the songs hook.

== Background ==
The artists co-wrote the song with its producers Polow Da Don and William Tyler, and its titular hook is built from a prominent sample of 50 Cent's previous single "I Get Money" (2007). "Baby by Me" was announced to be released on radio on September 10, 2009 at 10:00PM by Hot 97's DJ Funkmaster Flex and thisis50.com. A couple hours later, the song was then uploaded onto 50 Cent's Myspace page.

The song originally featured a different chorus sung by Jovan Dais, whose version was released online simultaneously with the eventual official version featuring Ne-Yo.

"The album version of the song was the one where you don't even know the singer," 50 told DJ Whoo Kid over the weekend on Sirius XM Radio. "I did the reference in the studio. It's a little more visual. Ne-Yo lightened it up a little bit and made it ready for radio. It works. I gotta sift through and see what I'm gonna put on the album. The Ne-Yo record is a stronger radio version."

The single was made available to download on Amazon and iTunes on October 26, 2009.

== Music video ==
The music video for "Baby by Me" was shot in October 2009 and features Kelly Rowland as 50 Cent's love interest. 50 ran into her when he was presenting at the Los Premios MTV Latinoamérica 2009 awards show in Los Angeles, California, and it occurred to him to snag the singer for his video, which was set to roll production 2 days later.

This video is great... Chris Robinson came up with a great treatment for it. It's obvious I wasn't in a hurry to make the music video until I found the right treatment, the right idea, to bring it to life.

50 Cent's said he was dead set on having a celebrity, rather than an unknown model, star as the girl he falls in love with in the video.

I had to find the right person to be my love interest in the music video...I found Kelly. It matches perfectly. The acting in the project is great. I think when people see it, they are gonna be surprised by it.

Ne-Yo, who sings on the hook, shot his part for the video in New York City, New York on Saturday, while 50 Cent and Rowland filmed in Los Angeles, California. The video premiered on November 2 on all MTV Networks. It also ranked at #43 on BET's Notarized: Top 100 Videos of 2009 countdown.

The song and video was very successful and has been viewed over 140 million times on YouTube as of March 2024.

== Reception ==
Billboard has stated: "With its club synthesizers and Ne-Yo-aided chorus, the track is far more radio-friendly than his past attempts. But it's also the least distinctive. A song like "Baby by Me" that overtly reaches for a pop audience may put 50 Cent back on the airwaves, but it won't necessarily energize the rapper's core fans. At this point, they might be more receptive to hearing something outside the box."

Diggy Simmons and Khalil have freestyled over the beat in a remix called "Be My Baby".

== Track listings ==
Digital single

No.	Title	Writer(s)	Sample(s)	Length
1.	"Baby by Me" (featuring Ne-Yo)	Curtis Jackson, Jamal Jones, William Tyler, Shaffer Smith	Contains a sample of "I Get Money" by 50 Cent	3:33

US CD single

No.	Title	Writer(s)	Producer(s)	Length
1.	"Baby by Me" (album version) (feat. Ne-Yo)	Curtis Jackson, Jamal Jones, William Tyler, Shaffer Smith	Polow Da Don, William Tyler	3:33
2.	"Baby by Me" (feat. Jovan Dais)	Curtis Jackson, Jamal Jones, William Tyler, Jovan Dais	Polow da Don, William Tyler	3:33

UK CD single

No.	Title	Writer(s)	Producer(s)	Length
1.	"Baby by Me" (clean version) (feat. Jovan Dais)	C. Jackson, J. Jones, J. Dais	Polow Da Don, William Tyler	3:33
2.	"Baby by Me" (explicit version) (feat. Ne-Yo)	C. Jackson, J. Jones, W. Tyler, S. Smith	Polow Da Don, William Tyler	3:33

UK digital single

No.	Title	Writer(s)	Producer(s)	Length
1.	"Baby by Me" (instrumental version)	C. Jackson, J. Jones, W. Tyler	Polow Da Don, William Tyler	3:33
2.	"Baby by Me" (music video)			4:05

UK Remixes, Pt. 1 CD single

No.	Title	Writer(s)	Producer(s)	Length
1.	"Baby by Me" (Digital Dog club remix)	C. Jackson, J. Jones	Polow Da Don	5:59
2.	"Baby by Me" (Digital Dog radio remix)	C. Jackson, J. Jones	Polow Da Don	2:32
3.	"Baby by Me" (Digital Dog dub remix)	C. Jackson, J. Jones	Polow Da Don	7:07

UK Remixes, Pt. 2 CD single

No.	Title	Writer(s)	Producer(s)	Length
1.	"Baby by Me" (Max Sanna & Steve Pitron extended remix) (with Ne-Yo)	C. Jackson, J. Jones, S. Smith	Polow da Don	5:47
2.	"Baby by Me" (Max Sanna & Steve Pitron radio remix) (with Ne-Yo)	C. Jackson, J. Jones, S. Smith	Polow Da Don	3:38
3.	"Baby by Me" (Digital Dog dub remix)	C. Jackson, J. Jones	Polow Da Don	7:08
4.	"Baby by Me" (Digital Dog club remix)	C. Jackson, J. Jones	Polow Da Don	5:59
5.	"Baby by Me" (Digital Dog radio remix)	C. Jackson, J. Jones	Polow Da Don	2:33

== Chart performance ==
"Baby by Me" debuted on the Billboard Hot 100 at #31 in the week ending November 14, 2009. The following week, it remained at that position, but the week after that, it moved up three positions to #28. In its fourth week, it fell one spot to number #29. However, it also continued to rise on the Rap charts, reaching a new peak of #3, and on the R&B/Hip-Hop charts, reaching a new peak of #9. On the UK Singles Chart, "Baby by Me" peaked at #17 in the week ending December 19, 2009, failing to enter the top ten just as previously intended lead single "Get Up" performed in 2008.

== Charts ==
=== Weekly charts ===
Chart (2009–2010)	Peak position
Australia (ARIA)	24
Austria (Ö3 Austria Top 40)	56
Belgium (Ultratip Bubbling Under Flanders)	4
Belgium (Ultratip Bubbling Under Wallonia)	14
Canada Hot 100 (Billboard)	53
France Download (SNEP)	33
Germany (GfK)	26
Ireland (IRMA)	27
Scottish Singles Sales (Official Charts)	31
Switzerland (Schweizer Hitparade)	43
UK Hip Hop/R&B (Official Charts)	8
UK Singles (Official Charts)	17
US Billboard Hot 100	28
US Hot R&B/Hip-Hop Songs (Billboard)	7
US Hot Rap Songs (Billboard)	3
US Rhythmic Airplay (Billboard)	14

=== Monthly charts ===
Chart (2010)	Peak position
Brazil (Brasil Hot 100 Airplay)	37
Brazil (Brasil Hot Pop Songs)	17

=== Year-end charts ===
Chart (2010)	Position
US Hot R&B/Hip-Hop Songs (Billboard)	64

== Certifications ==
Region	Certification	Certified units/sales
Brazil (Pro-Música Brasil)	Platinum	60,000^{‡}
New Zealand (RMNZ)	2× Platinum	60,000^{‡}
United Kingdom (BPI)	Gold	400,000^{‡}
United States (RIAA)	Gold	500,000^{‡}
^{‡} Sales+streaming figures based on certification alone.

== Release history ==
Region	Date	Format(s)	Label(s)	Ref.
United States	September 29, 2009	Rhythmic contemporary radio	Shady, Aftermath, Interscope	
United States	November 10, 2009	Contemporary hit radio	Shady, Aftermath, Interscope	
