= Swordfish Studios =

British video game developer (2002–2010)

Swordfish Studios Limited
- Company type: Subsidiary
- Industry: Video games
- Founded: 2002; 24 years ago
- Defunct: 2010
- Fate: Defunct
- Successor: Codemasters Birmingham
- Headquarters: Birmingham, England
- Key people: Trevor Williams
- Parent: Vivendi Games (2005–2008); Codemasters (2008–2010)

Swordfish Studios Limited was a British video game developer based in Birmingham founded by Trevor Williams and Joan Finnegan (wife of Paul Finnegan, former managing director of Rage Software Limited) in September 2002.

== History ==
Swordfish Studios was founded by Trevor Williams and Jean Finnegan in September 2002, located in Birmingham. Games developed by the company include two best selling International Rugby titles, including World Championship Rugby. Others include Brian Lara International Cricket 2005 and Cold Winter. In 2004, Swordfish Studios was named 'Developer of the Year' by The Independent Games Developers Association.

Swordfish Studios was acquired by Vivendi Universal Games in June 2005, becoming a fully owned studio of Sierra Entertainment.

On 12 November 2008, Swordfish's Manchester studio was sold to Monumental Games. Swordfish's Birmingham studio was acquired by Codemasters on 15 November 2008 after an agreement with Activision Blizzard. It is now known as Codemasters Birmingham. The studio closed down in 2010. Many of the former Swordfish Studios employees have been hired by Crytek UK.

== Games developed ==
Year	Game	Publisher	Genre	Platform(s)						
Year	Game	Publisher	Genre	PS2	Xbox	Win	OS X	X360	PS3	Mobile
2004	World Championship Rugby	Acclaim Entertainment	Sports	Yes	Yes	Yes	No	No	No	No
2005	Brian Lara International Cricket 2005	Codemasters	Sports	Yes	Yes	Yes	No	No	No	No
2005	Cold Winter	Vivendi Universal Games	First-person shooter	Yes	No	No	No	No	No	No
2009	50 Cent: Blood on the Sand	THQ	Third-person shooter	No	No	No	No	Yes	Yes	No
2010	Gedda Headz	Swordfish Studios	Multiplayer	No	No	No	No	No	No	Yes

== See also ==
- Vivendi Games
- Sierra Entertainment
