= Jonah Lomu Rugby =

1997 video game

- Cover art with Jonah Lomu
- Developer: Rage Software
- Publisher: Codemasters
- Platforms: MS-DOS, PlayStation, Sega Saturn
- Release: PlayStation: EU: March 31, 1997; MS-DOS & Sega Saturn: EU: September 1997
- Genre: Sports
- Modes: Single-player, multiplayer

Jonah Lomu Rugby is a rugby union video game developed by Rage Software and published by Codemasters in 1997. It was released for MS-DOS, PlayStation and the Sega Saturn. The title refers to former All Blacks winger Jonah Lomu. It was the first rugby union game released on the Sega Saturn or PlayStation platforms.

Following the 2003 closure of Rage Software, several members of the game's development team went on to work on World Championship Rugby.

== Gameplay ==
New Zealand are in possession and running the ball from a ruck (PlayStation).

Jonah Lomu Rugby puts the player in control of real-life national rugby union teams from the 1995 Rugby World Cup, including the 16 finalists and 16 other teams that participated in the qualifying campaign. The game has support for up to four players.

Matches also feature changing weather conditions, including rain and lightning effects. The game's visual presentation incorporates muddy playing surfaces and player uniforms becoming dirty during scrums and tackles.

=== Modes ===
Jonah Lomu Rugby has five modes: Friendly, World Cup, Tournament, Territories Cup and Classic Matches. The Friendly mode is a single exhibition game in which the player can play against computer-controlled or human opponents. The World Cup mode replicates the 1995 Rugby World Cup format, with the 16 teams arranged into the same four pools as in the real life tournament. Tournament mode is a knockout format contested by either 4, 8 or 16 teams. Territories Cup mode consists of leagues based around geographic location. The Five Nations and Tri Nations competitions feature the same teams competing in the real life equivalents, whilst the American Cup, Asian Cup and Pacific Cup each feature three teams from the areas.

The Classic Matches mode consists of eight scenario matches based on real-life World Cup matches that the player joins in progress with the aim of obtaining a different result to that in real-life.

== Development ==
Rage Software's Trevor Williams recounted: "We wanted a game that stayed true to the rules, but was easy to pick up and play without a complete understanding of all the ins and outs". After work had concluded on the studio's football title Striker '96 he stated that "we could see the potential in the engine in a sprite-based rugby simulation could both look good and run at the right pace", arguing that "using polygons would slow the game too much".

Programmers Tony McCabe and Antonio Argentieri explained that rugby video games are more difficult to make than other sports games, since the heavy specialization of the different players means a number of different AIs need to be designed and programmed to run simultaneously. The scrum was remodeled more than five times in an effort to make it work in play. Rage Software also sought to maintain a faster pace than a conventional rugby match by reducing stoppages for scrums and other interruptions. Trevor Williams explained that the developers emphasised running, passing and tackling while retaining the sport's basic rules. Rather than requiring players to select detailed tactical formations, the game used computer-controlled teammates that responded to the positions and abilities of other players. The passing system distinguished between shorter passes to nearby teammates and longer passes intended to exploit space in the opposition's defence.

Commentary for the game was supplied by Bill McLaren and Bill Beaumont. Rage Software purchased the audio rights to the 1995 Five Nations match between England and France to assist in producing realistic sounds for match play. During production, McLaren recorded thousands of words, phrases and player names, including those associated with less prominent international rugby teams.

The Saturn version was slated for release in June 1997, but the date was pushed back to September. The game was ready by the June date, but Codemasters held it back to coincide with the release of the PC version and the start of the new rugby season.

The PlayStation version was released in Japan on May 21, 1998 under the title Great Rugby Jikkyō '98: World Cup e no Michi.

== Reception ==
Reception

Review scores
Publication	Score
Computer and Video Games	4/5 (Playstation)
PlayStation Official Magazine – UK	7/10 (Playstation)
Sega Saturn Magazine	91% (Saturn)
The Sydney Morning Herald	4.5/5

Computer and Video Games gave a positive review of the PlayStation version, noting the "brilliantly realistic graphics and a logical control system are the stars here" and awarding the game 4/5. Australian magazine Hyper reviewed the PlayStation version in July 1997. The magazine welcomed the game as part of the growing representation of sports outside the traditionally US-focused sports-game market and regarded it as an appealing adaptation of rugby. The PlayStation version of Jonah Lomu Rugby entered the UK multi-format sales chart at number three, according to the July 1997 issue of Computer and Video Games.

The Sega Saturn version also received positive reviews. Matt Yeo praised the game in Sega Saturn Magazine, saying it has "one of the most innovative and easy to use game play systems ever utilised in a sports game". He particularly noted the use of on-screen menus during pauses in the game's action, saying they enable newcomers to more easily come to grips with the game by presenting rugby's complicated rules in a simplified, leisurely form. He also praised the four-player support, audio commentary, and dramatic weather conditions, and gave the game a score of 91%. In February 1998, Sega Saturn Magazine ranked Jonah Lomu Rugby 39th in its list of the top 50 Sega Saturn games. The Saturn version received positive reviews in France. Joypad awarded it 89%, describing it as a complete and enjoyable rugby game, although criticising occasional slowdown and considering its presentation inferior to the PlayStation version. Player One gave the Saturn version 92%, describing it as effectively identical to the PlayStation release and praising the game overall, while noting that the controls could initially be confusing.

== Legacy ==
In 2015, retrospective assessments continued to regard Jonah Lomu Rugby highly, with The Telegraph describing it as "the greatest computer game the sport has ever seen", while the Irish Independent similarly described it as among the best rugby video games ever made. The Irish Independent also noted that the game was fondly remembered by Irish PlayStation owners and that its appeal extended beyond rugby supporters. In Australia, Fox Sports similarly described the game as enduringly popular among rugby fans; during the 2015 Rugby World Cup, Australian internationals Drew Mitchell and Matt Giteau obtained a PlayStation and a copy of the game to play during the tournament.

The game developed an enduring following in New Zealand. In a 2022 retrospective, The Spinoff described Jonah Lomu Rugby as having attained cult status among a generation of rugby supporters and gamers. Former All Black Jeff Wilson recalled that Lomu would take a PlayStation on tour and that members of the team played the game, while Brad Weber described it as his favourite video game and recalled regularly playing it during his youth.

A copy of the PlayStation version is held in the Pacific Cultures collection of the Museum of New Zealand Te Papa Tongarewa. The museum describes the game as an artefact documenting the history of Pacific Islanders in sport and their emergence as prominent marketing figures for rugby in New Zealand and internationally.

The game has also maintained a small modding community. The East Terrace reported that New Zealand software developer Chris Chen created an ongoing fan modification that updates the game with modern teams, kits and players from Super Rugby franchises and international sides.

The game has also continued to be referenced within professional rugby. Following Duhan van der Merwe's solo try against England during the 2023 Six Nations Championship, Scotland head coach Gregor Townsend compared the run to playing Jonah Lomu Rugby, recalling the game's depiction of a player suddenly accelerating away from defenders.
