= G-Unit Records =

American record label

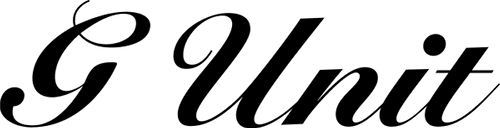
- Parent company: Universal Music Group
- Founded: October 15, 2002
- Founder: 50 Cent; Sha Money XL
- Distributors: Capitol Music Group; Interscope (April 2003 – February 2014)
- Genre: Hip-hop
- Country of origin: United States
- Location: New York City, New York, U.S.
- Official website: thisis50.com

G-Unit Records is an American record label, owned by Universal Music Group. Founded on October 15, 2002 by rapper 50 Cent and his business partner, Sha Money XL, the label was operated by Interscope Records until February 2014. Thereafter, distribution of G-Unit operated under Caroline Records and Capitol Music Group. The label had also launched the subsidiary label G-Note Records, which caters to R&B and pop. The label's flagship artist is its founder 50 Cent.

== History ==
=== 2003–2005 ===
Following 50 Cent's signing to Interscope Records in 2002, 50 Cent and his manager, Sha Money XL, launched G-Unit Records on October 15. G-Unit Records replaced 50 Cent's previous imprint, Rotten Apple Entertainment. The rap group G-Unit, then consisting of Lloyd Banks, Tony Yayo and Young Buck, was signed to the label as a group, with each respective member also being signed as a solo artist. The first album released on the label was 50 Cent's debut studio album, Get Rich or Die Tryin'. The album featured guest appearances from Young Buck, Tony Yayo and Lloyd Banks. Heavily anticipated upon release, Get Rich or Die Tryin' debuted and peaked at number one on the Billboard 200, and has been certified nonuple platinum by the RIAA. The album featured the hit singles "If I Can't" and "21 Questions". 50 Cent's success became the foundation for other G-Unit artists to release music. G-Unit's debut studio album, Beg for Mercy, was released in November 2003. The album sold 377,000 copies in its first week of release. It has now sold over 2.7 million units in the U.S. and was officially certified double platinum by the RIAA and 6 million copies worldwide. It has been certified double platinum by the RIAA.

Lloyd Banks released his debut album The Hunger for More on June 29, 2004 through G-Unit. The album featured guest appearances from G-Unit artists Tony Yayo, Young Buck, 50 Cent (who also executive produced the album), and The Game. Anchored by the success of the single On Fire, it debuted and peaked at number 1 on the Billboard 200. The Hunger For More was ultimately certified Platinum in America.

After bringing in West Coast rapper and Aftermath signee, the Game in early 2004, Spider Loc was also signed, around the time of Young Buck's Straight Outta Cashville release. However, Game and 50 Cent later had a falling out, and 50 Cent became unsure about signing new artists to his "family"—how he perceived G-Unit as a group and record label. Later in 2005, the opportunity came to sign Mobb Deep and M.O.P.

G-Unit Records ended 2005 with the November release of the soundtrack to Get Rich Or Die Tryin'. The album featured appearances from much of the label's roster. It peaked at number 2 on the Billboard 200, and would go on to be certified Platinum by the RIAA.

=== 2006–2009 ===
In 2006, G-Unit Records signed Young Hot Rod. In the same year, in conjunction with Mobb Deep's Infamous Records, the label signed both Nyce and 40 Glocc. In 2007, Mazaradi Fox was also added to the label. It was also highly anticipated that Detroit rapper, Trick Trick would sign to the label, though this deal never came to be.

In 2008, amidst rumors of a "beef" within G-Unit between 50 Cent and Young Buck, 50 Cent officially expelled Young Buck from the group, though assuring that Buck was still signed with the label. Numerous slander songs then arose on the internet from both camps, with Young Buck being included on a track with former rival and ex-G-Unit member, Game. 50 Cent then leaked a taped phone conversation between himself and Young Buck, which showed one of the true reasons for the falling out: 50 Cent was owed money by the Southern rapper. Young Buck later stated the conversation had taken place over a year before the leak. The two camps have since released a multitude of songs aimed at each other, though the feud seems to have settled down as of late 2008.

In late 2009, 50 Cent's fourth album, Before I Self Destruct, was released; which featured a track entitled "So Disrespectful", which insulted his various rivals including Jay-Z and former G-Unit Records artists, Game and Young Buck. Also in 2009, 50 Cent would collaborate with former Roc-A-Fella Records artist Beanie Sigel, which would also lead to speculation that Beanie Sigel was signing to G-Unit Records. While promoting Before I Self Destruct, 50 Cent also did a radio interview in which he spoke about the G-Unit Records roster. Within the interview, it was confirmed that Game, Young Buck, Spider Loc and Young Hot Rod were still signed to the label, while both M.O.P and Mobb Deep were no longer signed. In the meantime, the label would go on to sign R&B singer, Governor and Beanie Sigel on November 5, respectively.

=== 2010–present ===
In early January 2010, 50 Cent claimed that he was looking to sign new comedians and authors to the label, venturing outside the realm of recording artists. Atlanta Young Jack Thriller would be the first comedian signed to the label, releasing a weekly "So Disrespectful," YouTube podcast. also becoming a regular guest on Shade45's G-Unit Radio, and co-host of the program. 50 Cent also expressed interest in signing European R&B singer Jamelia to G-Unit Records, citing that it could not only help her build a reputation in the U.S., but it would also be the first signing of a female artist to the label since singer, Olivia. Also in early 2010, in reference to his recent affiliation with 50 Cent and G-Unit Records, Beanie Sigel stated that he would not be signing with the label, as he and 50 Cent mutually "used" each other, though no harm to their business relationship was made. Meanwhile, Young Buck responded to various songs released on 50 Cent's Before I Self Destruct. He released five records aimed at 50 Cent, Tony Yayo, Lloyd Banks, G-Unit, and 40 Glocc.

In an interview with MTV, 50 Cent announced that he is looking for new artists, "You'll see new faces, because I'm looking for new artists now. I'll sign new artists and take them with me and kinda groom them. Some of the stuff you can't teach a person; they gotta have it". While he was on tour, recently made affiliate Beanie Sigel confirmed after a long-awaited wait, that he would be finished signing to G-Unit when 50 got back from tour.

In August 2010, amidst the controversy surrounding Montana Fishburne's entrance into the adult film industry, co-porn star, Brian Pumper, released several rap songs shouting out 50 Cent, Lloyd Banks and Tony Yayo. Pumper repeatedly stated his wish to be signed to G-Unit. However, the members of G-Unit have repeatedly stated they are not interested in signing Pumper. Also in August, Tony Yayo discussed how he and The Pack member, "Lil B," had hooked up and worked together in the studio, along with Yayo's newly proclaimed protege, Danny Brown. He also stated that there was a large possibility that Lil B might be signing to G-Unit Records, and spoke as if Danny Brown was already signed. Despite this, Brown confirmed that he is not signed to G-Unit yet, but he is talks of possibly signing to the label. Also in September 2010, there was quite a bit of speculation that R&B singer, Mýa was in the process of signing to, or was already signed to the label. Lloyd Banks later in September would confirm that Mobb Deep member, Havoc was in talks to negotiate a new contract for the group in terms of signing to the label.

On August 13, 2010, in an interview with MTV News, Lloyd Banks announced that G-Unit had signed a limited distribution deal with EMI in North America. The distribution deal is "strictly with artists Lloyd Banks and Tony Yayo," as stated by 50 Cent in an interview.

In early March 2011, rapper Shawty Lo reported in an interview that he was in talks with the label about signing. On June 8, 2011, it was confirmed by both Shawty Lo and AllHipHop.com that he had signed a deal with G-Unit Records.

It was later confirmed by Shawty Lo that he had not signed to the label as an individual artist, but that his label D4L would be distributed by G-Unit Records.

Rumors began appearing that Lea Sunshine, the singer who was featured in Lil' Flip's hit single, "Sunshine", was signing to G-Unit. After touring with G-Unit and being featured on G-Note Records artist, Hot Rod's debut single, she confirmed on her Twitter account that she had signed with G-Note Records.

After a cameo appearance in Tony Yayo's music video, "Haters", it was reported by MTV that former Young Money affiliate, Kidd Kidd, had signed with the label. Soon after, Genasis reported via his Twitter that he had just signed a deal with 50 Cent and G-Unit Records after 50 Cent had seen a video of Genasis performing.

In December 2011, 50 Cent signed Jersey Shore star, DJ Pauly D, to G-Note Records, to produce three of label's albums. On December 9, 2011, 50 Cent also released a mixtape, The Big 10. Guest appearances on The Big 10 include G-Unit affiliates, Kidd Kidd, Precious Paris and Tony Yayo. It also introduced G-Units newest signee, Paris.

In the years to follow, 50 Cent would continue to struggle to maintain a palatable working relationship with Interscope. In a 2012 interview, he explained the reason for the discord: "The deal I gave them was so well-put-together for them that they were to receive $750,000 in advance on the next albums - each one of the artists. They gotta remove that in this climate of record sales".

In April 2012, (after being ousted from the crew in 2008), Young Buck entered talks to work with the label. Buck provided the update in a 2012 interview stating, "I'ma be honest with you, finally we're at a point where we're having some kind of negotiations with what they're going to be able to do for us at G-Unit." The Nashville, Tennessee native said he was ready to make a return to music, whether a part of G-Unit or not. Young Buck's last album was the 2010 independent release, The Rehab. The negotiations may not lead to a new deal between Young Buck and G-Unit, but the rapper remains optimistic.

On February 20, 2014, it was reported that 50 Cent and G-Unit Records left Interscope umbrella to operate in conjunction with Caroline Records; a unit of Capitol Music Group.

On November 8, 2016, 50 Cent signed Uncle Murda to G-Unit Records.

In early 2018, Kidd Kidd announced his departure from both G-Unit as a group member and label artist. Lloyd Banks followed suit in 2018.

== Subsidiaries ==
=== G-Note ===
In 2010, G-Unit launched a subsidiary label called G-Note Records, with a focus on R&B and Pop music. Artists signed to this label are Governor, who was signed to G-Unit Records in 2009, and Hot Rod who originally signed to G-Unit Records in 2006. In early 2011, Lea Sunshine was signed to the label, though she later left the label. In December 2011, DJ Pauly D was signed to G-Note Records, but has since left the label.

== Artists ==
=== Current acts ===
Act	Year signed	Releases under the label
50 Cent	Founder	5
Tony Yayo	2003	1
Uncle Murda	2016	—

=== Former acts ===
Act	Years on the label	Releases under the label
G-Unit	2003—2018	2
Lloyd Banks	2003—2018	3
Young Buck	2003—2008; 2014—2024	2
The Game	2003—2006	1
Olivia	2003—2007	—
Spider Loc	2005—2011	—
Mobb Deep	2005—2008	1
Lil Scrappy	2006—2008	1
Kidd Kidd	2011—2018	—
Rotimi	2015—2018	1

== Discography ==
Artist	Album	Details
50 Cent	Get Rich or Die Tryin' (released with Shady and Aftermath)	Released: February 6, 2003; Chart positiom: #1 U.S.; RIAA certification: 9× Platinum
G-Unit	Beg for Mercy	Released: November 14, 2003; Chart position: #2 U.S.; RIAA certification: 2× Platinum
Lloyd Banks	The Hunger for More	Released: June 29, 2004; Chart position: #1 U.S.; RIAA certification: Platinum
Young Buck	Straight Outta Cashville	Released: August 24, 2004; Chart position: #3 U.S.; RIAA certification: Platinum
The Game	The Documentary (released with Aftermath)	Released: January 18, 2005; Chart position: #1 U.S.; RIAA certification: 2× Platinum
50 Cent	The Massacre (released with Shady and Aftermath)	Released: March 3, 2005; Chart position: #1 U.S.; RIAA certification: 6× Platinum
Tony Yayo	Thoughts of a Predicate Felon	Released: August 30, 2005; Chart position: #2 U.S.; RIAA certification: —
G-Unit Records	Get Rich or Die Tryin'	Released: November 8, 2005; Chart position: #2 U.S.; RIAA certification: Platinum
Mobb Deep	Blood Money (released with Infamous)	Released: May 2, 2006; Chart position: #3 U.S.; RIAA certification: —
Lloyd Banks	Rotten Apple	Released: October 10, 2006; Chart position: #3 U.S.; RIAA certification: —
Lil Scrappy	Bred 2 Die, Born 2 Live (released with BME)	Released: December 4, 2006; Chart position: #24 U.S.; RIAA certification: —
Young Buck	Buck the World	Released: March 27, 2007; Chart position: #3 U.S.; RIAA certification: —
G-Unit	T·O·S (Terminate on Sight)	Released: July 1, 2008; Chart position: #4 U.S.; RIAA certification: Gold
Lloyd Banks	H.F.M. 2 (The Hunger for More 2) (released with EMI)	Released: November 22, 2010; Chart position: #26 U.S.; RIAA certification: —
50 Cent	Animal Ambition	Released: June 3, 2014; Chart position: #4 U.S.; RIAA certification: —
G-Unit	The Beauty of Independence	Released: August 25, 2014; Chart position: #17 U.S.; RIAA certification: —
G-Unit	The Beast Is G Unit	Released: March 3, 2015; Chart position: #27 U.S.; RIAA certification: —
Rotimi	Jeep Music, Vol. 1	Released: August 4, 2017; Chart position: —; RIAA certification: —

== See also ==
- List of East Coast hip-hop record labels
- G-Note Records
