= Chrisette Michele discography =

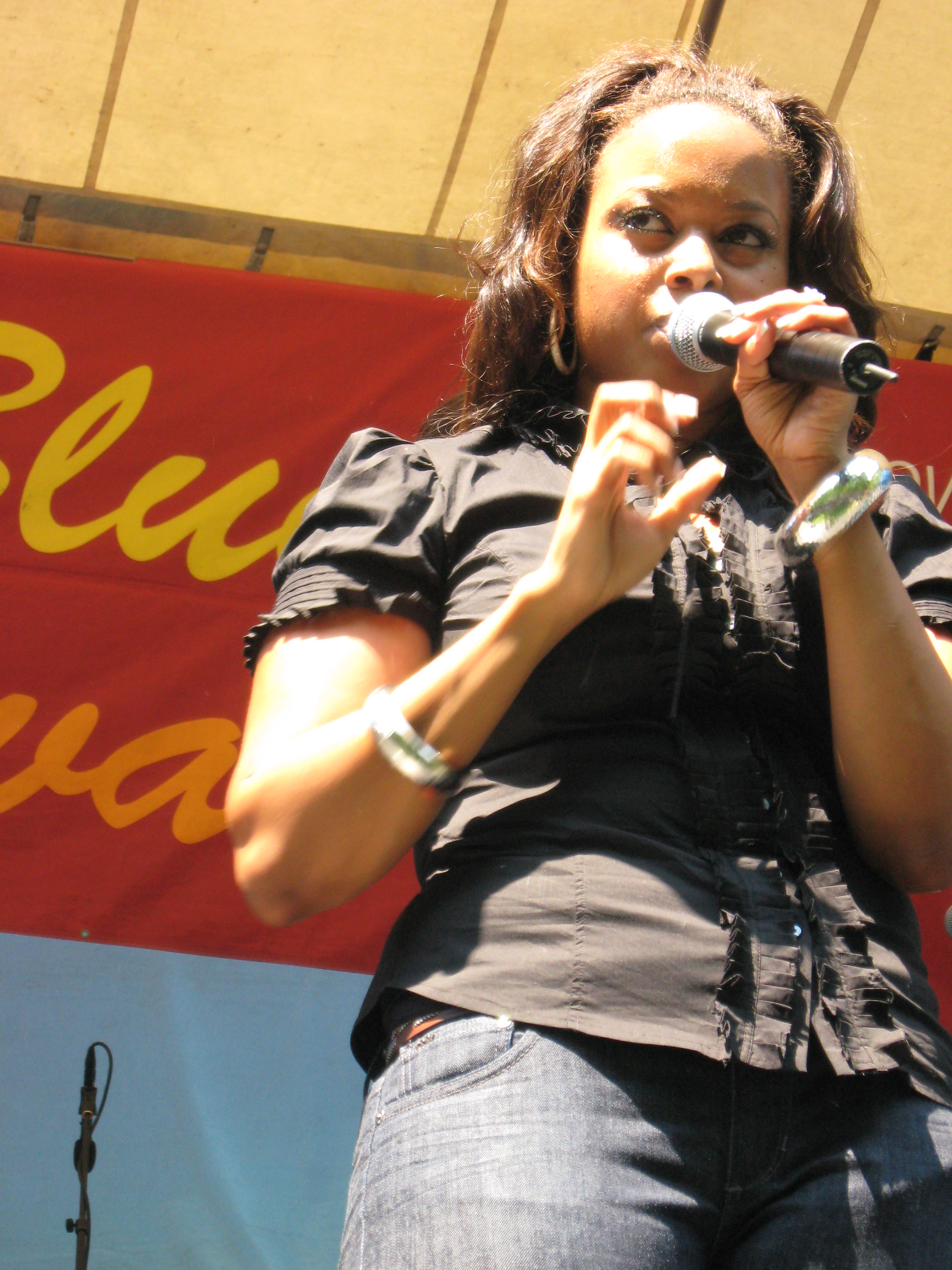
- Michele performing in Brooklyn in August 2007
- Studio albums: 5
- Extended plays: 1
- Singles: 15
- Mixtapes: 3

This is the discography page of American R&B/soul singer Chrisette Michele. She has released five albums in her career.

== Albums ==
=== Studio albums ===
List of studio albums, with selected chart positions and sales figures
Title	Album details	Peak chart positions		Sales
Title	Album details	US	US R&B /HH	Sales
I Am	Released: June 19, 2007; Label: Def Jam; Formats: CD, digital download	29	5	US: 421,000
Epiphany	Released: May 5, 2009; Label: Def Jam; Formats: CD, digital download	1	1	US: 462,000
Let Freedom Reign	Released: November 30, 2010; Label: Def Jam; Formats: CD, digital download	25	7	US: 80,000
Better	Released: June 11, 2013; Label: Motown; Formats: CD, digital download	12	2	US: 133,000
Milestone	Released: June 10, 2016; Label: Rich Hipster, Caroline; Formats: CD, digital download	73	5	

=== Extended plays ===
List of extended plays, with selected chart positions
Title	Album details	Peak chart positions	
Title	Album details	US	US R&B /HH
The Lyricists' Opus	Released: November 24, 2014 (US); Label: Rich Hipster; Formats: CD, digital download	147	23

=== Mixtapes ===
List of mixtapes
Title	Album details
Love Thy Brother	Released: November 5, 2010 (US); Label: N/A; Formats: Digital download
Audrey Hepburn: An Audiovisual Presentation	Released: December 7, 2012 (US); Label: N/A; Formats: Digital download
Steady Gang	Released: February 27, 2016 (US); Label: N/A; Formats: Digital download
Out of Control	Released: April 13, 2018 (US); Label: Rich Hipster, Four Kings; Formats: CD, Digital download

== Singles ==
=== As main artist ===
List of singles, with selected chart positions and certifications, showing year released and album name
Title	Year	Chart positions				Certifications	Sales	Album
Title	Year	US	US R&B /HH	US Gosp.	KOR Int.	Certifications	Sales	Album
"If I Have My Way"	2007	— (Note: "If I Have My Way" did not enter the US Billboard Hot 100, but peaked at number 13 on the US Bubbling Under Hot 100 chart.)	24	—	—			I Am
"Best of Me"	2007	—	—	—	—			I Am
"Be OK" (featuring will.i.am)	2007	—	61	—	—			I Am
"Love Is You"	2008	—	90	—	14		KOR: 140,993 (Note: Cumulative sales of "Love Is You" in South Korea: 2011 (Month 3): 22,663; 2011 (Month 4): 23,407; 2013: 94,923)	I Am
"Epiphany"	2009	89	14	—	—	RIAA: Gold		Epiphany
"Blame It on Me"	2009	—	28	—	—			Epiphany
"What You Do" (featuring Ne-Yo)	2009	—	57	—	17		KOR: 189,469	Epiphany
"Fragile" (featuring Wale)	2009	—	101	—	—			Epiphany
"All I Ever Think About"	2010	—	57	—	—			Epiphany
"I'm a Star"	2010	—	65	—	—			Let Freedom Reign
"Goodbye Game"	2010	—	— (Note: "Goodbye Game" did not enter the US Hot R&B/Hip-Hop Songs chart but peaked at number 27 on the US Adult R&B Airplay chart.)	—	—			Let Freedom Reign
"Charades" (featuring 2 Chainz)	2013	—	—	—	65		KOR: 3,121	Better
"A Couple of Forevers"	2013	— (Note: "A Couple of Forevers" did not enter the US Billboard Hot 100, but peaked at number 2 on the US Bubbling Under Hot 100 chart.)	22	—	19	RIAA: Gold	KOR: 15,759	Better
"Love Won't Leave Me Out"	2013	—	— (Note: "Love Won't Leave Me Out" did not enter the US Hot R&B/Hip-Hop Songs chart but peaked at number 24 on the US Adult R&B Airplay chart.)	—	—			Better
"Unbreakable"	2016	—	— (Note: "Unbreakable" did not enter the US Hot R&B/Hip-Hop Songs chart but peaked at number 49 on the US R&B/Hip-Hop Airplay chart.)	—	—			Milestone
"Strong Black Woman"	2018	—	— (Note: "Strong Black Woman" did not enter the US Hot R&B/Hip-Hop Songs chart but peaked at number 27 on the US R&B/Hip-Hop Airplay chart.)	—	—			Out of Control
"No Greater Love" (with Rudy Currence)	2021	—	—	16	—			Stained Glass Windows
"Home"	2024	—	— (Note: "Home" did not enter the US Hot R&B/Hip-Hop Songs chart but peaked at number 23 on the US R&B/Hip-Hop Airplay chart.)	—	—			TBA

=== As featured artist ===
List of singles, with selected chart positions, showing year released
Title	Year	Chart positions		Certifications	Album
Title	Year	US	US R&B /HH	Certifications	Album
"Lost One" (Jay-Z featuring Chrisette Michele)	2006	58	19	RIAA: Gold	Kingdom Come
"Can't Forget About You" (Nas featuring Chrisette Michele)	2007	—	46		Hip Hop Is Dead
"Rising Up" (The Roots featuring Chrisette Michele & Wale)	2008	—	—		Rising Down
"Aston Martin Music" (Rick Ross featuring Chrisette Michele & Drake)	2010	30	2	RIAA: 3× Platinum; BPI: Silver; RMNZ: Gold	Teflon Don
"If It's Love" (Kem featuring Chrisette Michele)	2011	—	24		Non-album single
"Ah Yeah" (Robert Glasper Experiment featuring Chrisette Michele & Musiq Soulchild)	2012	—	86		Black Radio

== Other charted songs ==
List of other charted songs, with selected chart positions and certifications, showing year released and album name
Title	Year	Peak chart positions		Sales	Album
Title	Year	US Adult R&B	KOR Int.	Sales	Album
"All I Ever Think About"	2009	15	—		
"I Don't Know Why, But I Do"	2010	—	34		Let Freedom Reign
"Rich Hipster"	2013	—	51	KOR: 6,063 (Note: Cumulative sales of "Rich Hipster" in South Korea: 2013 (Week 25): 3,631; 2013 (Week 26): 2,432)	Better
"To the Moon"	2016	20	—		Milestone

== Guest appearances ==
List of non-single guest appearances, with other performing artists, showing year released and album name
Title	Year	Other artist(s)	Album
"Still Dreaming"	2007	Nas, Kanye West	Hip Hop Is Dead
"Hope"	2007	Nas	Hip Hop Is Dead
"Slow Down"	2007	Ghostface Killah	The Big Doe Rehab
"Let Us Live"	2008	The Game	L.A.X.
"Shades"	2009	Wale	Attention: Deficit
"Take It"	2010	Eric Benét	Lost in Time
"Nobody Wins a War"	2010	Raheem DeVaughn	The Love & War MasterPeace
"Money Changes"	2012	Wale	Folarin
"Do It Right"	2012	Ruben Studdard	Letters from Birmingham
"Supaphly"	2013	Iman Shumpert	Th3 #Post90s
"Black Unicorn"	2013	2 Chainz, Sunni Patterson	B.O.A.T.S. II: Me Time
"Never Gone"	2013	Eve	Lip Lock
"Don't Wanna Look Back"	2015	Tyrese	Black Rose
"Like This"	2016	Chinx, Meet Sims	Legends Never Die
