= Blame It on Me (Chrisette Michele song) =

Single by Chrisette Michele

from the album Epiphany
- Released: May 12, 2009
- Genre: Soul; R&B
- Length: 4:09
- Label: Island Def Jam
- Songwriters: C. Payne; C. Harmon; C. Kelly
- Producer: Chuck Harmony

Chrisette Michele singles chronology
"Epiphany" (2009)	"Blame It on Me" (2009)	"What You Do" (2009)

"Blame It on Me" is the second single from American soul–R&B singer–songwriter Chrisette Michele's second studio album, Epiphany. It was released to radio on May 12, 2009. The second single was originally scheduled to be "What You Do" featuring label-mate Ne-Yo, but was changed at the last minute.

== Critical reception ==
Mariel Concepcion of Billboard Magazine says "Chrisette pours her silky vocals atop hollow drums and slinky piano strokes on the breakup song "Blame It on Me."

The Koalition comments on how "Blame It on Me" showcases Ms. Michele and arguably her best vocal performance on the album as she takes the blame and responsibility for a failed relationship even though the two tried their hardest to make it work.

== Charts ==
=== Weekly charts ===
Chart (2009)	Peak position
US Hot R&B/Hip-Hop Songs (Billboard)	28

=== Year-end charts ===
Chart (2009)	Position
US Hot R&B/Hip-Hop Songs (Billboard)	91
