= Better (Chrisette Michele album) =

Studio album by Chrisette Michele
- Released: June 11, 2013
- Length: 51:24
- Label: Universal Motown
- Producers: Shea Taylor; Pop & Oak; Carvin & Ivan; Darhyl Camper Jr.; J. Rob; Chrisette Michele; Chuck Harmony; Tommy Brown; Travis Sayles; Wizzy Wow; Elvis "Blac Elvis" Williams

Chrisette Michele chronology
Let Freedom Reign (2010)	Better (2013)	Milestone (2016)

Singles from Better
- 1. "Charades" Released: January 29, 2013; 2. "A Couple of Forevers" Released: February 5, 2013

Better is the fourth studio album by American R&B singer Chrisette Michele. The album was released on June 11, 2013. The album features guest appearances from 2 Chainz, Wale, Bilal, Dunson and Nello Luchi.

== Critical reception ==
Professional ratings
Review scores
Source	Rating
AllMusic	4/5 stars

AllMusic editor praised Better as a confident and emotionally uplifting album inspired by personal growth and recovery. He highlighted her expressive vocals, improved artistic freedom, and standout tracks such as "A Couple of Forevers," "Let Me Win," and "Charades," calling the album a showcase for her natural dynamism and positivity. Ken Capobianco of The Boston Globe commended the album's "commanding vocals" and "savvy song sense," noting its themes of self-realization and love while praising Michele's performances across its soul ballads and mid-tempo tracks. He criticized 2 Chainz's guest appearance on "Charades" as a misstep.

Billboard's Gail Mitchell praised Better for showcasing Michele's "compelling voice," calling it a strong set filled with standout tracks and effective collaborations. She highlighted her "supple, emotive vocals" on songs such as "Love Won't Leave Me Out" and "Visual Love," noting the album's consistent vocal strengths. Spin gave the album a 6/10 rating, noting that Michele’s blend of Ella Fitzgerald's "girlish insouciance" and Billie Holiday's "shapely vowels" was particularly effective on Ne-Yo's compositions. Rated R&B viewed Better as a return to Michele's adult contemporary R&B roots, praising its emotional depth, soulful performances, and vocal strengths.

== Commercial performance ==
In the United States, the album debuted at number twelve on the Billboard 200 and number two on the Top R&B/Hip-Hop Albums chart, with around 27,000 copies sold in the first week. It marked Michele's highest-charting album since Epiphany (2009). By May 2016, it had sold 133,000 copies in the United States.

== Track listing ==
No.	Title	Writer(s)	Producer(s)	Length
1.	"Be In Love"	Chrisette Payne; Shea Taylor	Taylor	2:42
2.	"A Couple of Forevers"	Payne; Tiwa Savage; Warren "Oak" Felder; Andrew "Pop" Wansel; Kenny Gamble; Leon Huff	Pop & Oak	3:57
3.	"Let Me Win"	Payne; Ivan "Orthodox" Barias; Darhyl "DJ" Camper, Jr.; Linette Payne; Lloyd Ashley Pinchback	Carvin & Ivan	3:56
4.	"Rich Hipster" (featuring Wale)	Payne; Olubowale Akintimehin; Justen "J. Rob" Robinson; Askia Fountain	Robinson	4:09
5.	"Love Won't Leave Me Out"	Payne; Barias; Haggins; Johnnie Smith	Carvin & Ivan	3:54
6.	"Interlude (In My Head Better)"	Payne	Chrisette Michele	0:17
7.	"Better"	Payne; Charles T. Harmon; Kevin Randolph; Steve Wyreman; Ernest Wilson	Chuck Harmony	3:41
8.	"Snow"	Priscilla Renea Hamilton; Felder; Wansel	Pop & Oak	3:30
9.	"Visual Love"	Victoria McCants; Travis Sayles; Tommy Brown	Brown; Sayles	3:41
10.	"Charades" (featuring 2 Chainz)	Payne; Tauheed Epps; Isra Lohata	Wizzy Wow	3:58
11.	"Interlude (In My Heart Convo With Boyfriend)"	Payne	Michele	0:34
12.	"You Mean That Much to Me"	Camper Jr.; Kristal "Tyte" Oliver; Kristofer "César" Murray	Camper	4:52
13.	"Supa"	Harold Lilly, Jr.; Elvis Williams	Blac Elvis	3:53
14.	"Interlude (In My Bed Sleeping Alone)"	Payne	Michele	0:50
15.	"Get Through the Night"	Payne; Harmon; Randolph; Wyreman; Wilson	Harmony	3:19
16.	"Can the Cool Be Loved" (featuring Bilal & Dunson)	Payne; Kenton Dunson; Lohata; Bilal Oliver	Wizzy Wow	4:08
Total length:				51:24

Deluxe edition bonus tracks
No.	Title	Writer(s)	Producer(s)	Length
17.	"Ten Foot Stilettos"	Payne; Taalib Johnson	Musiq Soulchild	3:23
18.	"Interlude (Perch Yo Girlz Phone Convo)"	Payne	Michele	0:28
19.	"I'm Still Fly"	Payne; Johnson	Musiq Soulchild	3:48
20.	"Love in the Afternoon" (featuring Nello Luchi)	Payne; Lohata; Smith	Wizzy Wow	4:17

Sample credits

- "A Couple of Forevers" contains samples of "Stairway to Heaven" as performed by The O'Jays.
- "Let Me Win" contains a sample of "Ashley's Roachclip" as performed by The Soul Searchers.

== Charts ==
=== Weekly charts ===
Weekly chart performance for Better
Chart (2013)	Peak position
US Billboard 200	12
US Digital Albums (Billboard)	19
US Indie Store Album Sales (Billboard)	16
US Top R&B/Hip-Hop Albums (Billboard)	2

=== Year-end charts ===
Year-end chart performance for Better
Chart (2013)	Position
US Top R&B/Hip-Hop Albums (Billboard)	58
