= Hip Hop Is Dead (song) =

Single by Nas featuring will.i.am

from the album Hip Hop Is Dead
- Released: November 5, 2006 (U.S.); January 29, 2007 (UK)
- Recorded: 2006
- Length: 3:45
- Label: Def Jam; Columbia
- Songwriters: Nasir Jones; William Adams, Jr.; Jerry Lordan; Doug Ingle
- Producer: will.i.am

Nas singles chronology
"Blindfold Me" (2006)	"Hip Hop Is Dead" (2006)	"Can't Forget About You" (2006)

will.i.am singles chronology
"Fergalicious" (2006)	"Hip Hop Is Dead" (2006)	"A Dream" (2006)

Music video
- "Hip Hop Is Dead" on YouTube

"Hip Hop Is Dead" is the first and title single taken from Nas' 2006 album of the same name. It is produced by and features will.i.am. It peaked at number 48 on the Billboard Hot R&B/Hip-Hop Songs chart, as well as number 41 on the Billboard Hot 100. On December 31, 2007, the music video for "Hip Hop Is Dead" appeared at number 93 on BET's Notarized: Top 100 Videos of 2007 countdown, even though the video was released in December 2006.

== Overview ==
The lyrics deal with the idea of hip-hop's death as artistically viable music, as explained below:

Everybody sounds the same, commercialize the game
Reminiscin' when it wasn't all business
It forgot where it started
So we all gather here for the dearly departed

Nas decries hip hop's commercialization and pledges to stay true to its origins, as in the last line of verse 1, where Nas mentions MC Shan and MC Ren, by saying "So nigga, who's your top ten, is it MC Shan is it MC Ren." Nas also mentions NBA commissioner David Stern.

== Original samples ==
"Hip Hop Is Dead" contains samples of "Apache" performed by the Incredible Bongo Band, and their cover version of "In-A-Gadda-Da-Vida", originally performed by Iron Butterfly. Nas previously used the same sample on "Thief's Theme". In the second verse Nas uses the line "the bigger the cap the bigger the peelin'" which was used in Ice Cube's tracks "Steady Mobbin'" and "No Vaseline" off his 1991 album Death Certificate.

== Censorship ==
On the album, both original and edited, the lyrics have been altered to remove profanities and gun references. The parts of the song when Nas says the word "nigga," that term is removed and replaced by other words, but it still keeps some words which are censored, including "ganja". The original one can also be heard censored, when Nas says a profanity, the disc is scratched on words like "AK, ganja, nigga and ass" but has less censored words than the censored version, which blanks out the profanity. Some lines are changed into another line because it originally had profanity in it, when Nas says the line "Rich ass niggas is ridin' with three llamas", it is changed to "Quick fast trigger fingers on the llama". Also when Nas says the line "Cuz we love to talk on ass we gettin'" to "Cuz we love to talk on nasty chickens". The unedited version can be found on various mixtapes. The main part of the song that is constantly changed is the hook. The different versions of the hook are:

- Original single version:

"If hip hop should die before I wake / I'll put an extended clip inside of my AK / Roll to every station, murder the DJ / Roll to every station, murder the DJ"

- Album version:

"If hip hop should die before I wake / I'll put/load an extended clip and body 'em all day / Roll to every station, wreck the DJ / Roll to every station, wreck the DJ"

For the MTV version, "clip and body 'em" is censored, along with words like smoke, die, grindin', hittin', behind, stick-ups, and killings.

== Sampled ==
- Chamillionaire sampled the beat for the track "Hip Hop Warning" on Mixtape Messiah 2.
- J. Holiday sampled the beat for the track "R&B Is Dead" on Chocolate City Mixtape.

== Track listing ==
1. "Hip Hop Is Dead" (clean)
2. "Hip Hop Is Dead" (instrumental)
3. "Where Y'all At" (explicit)

== Charts ==
=== Weekly charts ===
Chart (2007)	Peak position
Australia (ARIA)	84
Australia Urban (ARIA)	18
Finland (Suomen virallinen lista)	12
Germany (GfK)	84
Italy (FIMI)	27
New Zealand (Recorded Music NZ)	28
Scotland Singles (OCC)	35
UK Hip Hop/R&B (OCC)	2
UK Singles (OCC)	35
US Billboard Hot 100	41
US Hot R&B/Hip-Hop Songs (Billboard)	48
US Hot Rap Songs (Billboard)	25
US Pop 100 (Billboard)	35

=== Year-end charts ===
Chart (2007)	Position
UK Urban (Music Week)	22
