= Hollywood (Jay-Z song) =

Song recorded by American rapper Jay-Z

Single by Jay-Z featuring Beyoncé

from the album Kingdom Come
- Released: January 23, 2007
- Recorded: 2006
- Studio: Sony Music Studios (New York, NY)
- Genre: Hip hop; R&B
- Length: 4:17; 3:18 (Beyoncé version)
- Label: Roc-A-Fella; Def Jam
- Songwriters: Shawn Carter; Shaffer Smith; Reggie "Syience" Perry
- Producers: Syience; Ne-Yo

Jay-Z singles chronology
| "30 Something" (2007) | "Hollywood" (2007) | "Umbrella" (2007) |

Beyoncé singles chronology
| "Listen" (2007) | "Hollywood" (2007) | "Amor Gitano" (2007) |

Audio video
- "Hollywood" on YouTube

"Hollywood" is a song recorded by American rapper Jay-Z for his ninth studio album, Kingdom Come (2006). It features Jay-Z's now-wife, American singer-songwriter Beyoncé, and was released as a single in the US on January 23, 2007. Jay-Z co-wrote the song with its producers Ne-Yo and Reggie "Syience" Perry. "Hollywood" is a disco-influenced R&B song with lyrics that detail the tiredness music stars, working in the American cinema industry, sometimes feel. The song was well received by music critics who praised its musical arrangement as well as the guest vocals by Knowles.

"Hollywood" charted on US Billboard component charts, reaching a peak of number 56 on the Hot R&B/Hip-Hop Songs chart in early March 2007. It also gained attention in Australia where it charted inside the top 100 positions of the ARIA Singles Chart. Knowles later recorded a solo version of the song, which was re-titled "Welcome to Hollywood", and included it on the Deluxe Edition of her second studio album, B'Day (2006). A video interlude was recorded for The Beyoncé Experience tour where clips of Knowles were shown and music videos from her B'Day Anthology were comprised together, while the song was played on the tour.

== Background ==
"Hollywood"
A 24-second sample of the chorus of "Hollywood", featuring Knowles' vocals while Jay-Z raps in the background.

"Hollywood", featuring guest vocals from Knowles, was included as the tenth track on Jay-Z's ninth studio album, Kingdom Come (2006). It sees songwriting duties by Jay-Z as well as R&B singer Ne-Yo, and utilizes production from Reggie "Syience" Perry. The song is an R&B intoned simple one, also containing elements of disco, which is a genre of dance music. According to Louis Pattison of New Musical Express, "Hollywood" expresses "a weariness with the showbiz merry-go-round." It was sent by Def Jam and Roc-A-Fella Records to US rhythmic radio for airplay on January 23, 2007, and to contemporary hit radio on February 6, 2007.

=== "Welcome to Hollywood" ===
"Welcome to Hollywood"

Song by Beyoncé

from the album B'Day (2007 Deluxe edition)
- Released: April 3, 2007
- Length: 3:18
- Label: Columbia; Music World; Sony Urban
- Songwriters: Beyoncé Knowles; Shawn Carter; Reggie "Syience" Perry; Shaffer Smith
- Producers: Syience; Beyoncé Knowles

A solo version of the song was included as the fifth track on the 2007 Deluxe Edition of Beyoncé's B'Day (2006), retitled "Welcome to Hollywood". All of Jay-Z's rap verses were removed and replaced with Beyoncé's hook of the original songs. Jay-Z's outro verse was also re-recorded by Beyoncé as well. The chorus still features Jay-Z in the background. This version was included on Knowles' 2007 live album, The Beyoncé Experience. A karaoke version of "Welcome to Hollywood" was later included on Knowles' 2008 album, Beyoncé Karaoke Hits, Vol I.

A video interlude was recorded for The Beyoncé Experience tour where clips of Knowles were shown and music videos from her B'Day Anthology were comprised together. The video also shows video clips of Beyoncé behind the scenes of photo shoots and commercials and red carpet events with fans. "Welcome to Hollywood" was included as the 31st track on Knowles' live album, The Beyoncé Experience Live (2007).

== Critical reception ==
The song was generally well received by music critics who complimented Knowles' guest vocals and the R&B tone. Spence D., writing for IGN Music stated that Knowles shines on "Hollywood". This was echoed by Kelefa Sanneh of The New York Times who said that Knowles "sounds great on 'Hollywood'." By contrast, Henry Adaso of About.com coined the collaboration of Jay-Z and Knowles on "Hollywood" as the worst one on the entire album. Louis Pattison of New Musical Express considered Knowles voice as "commanding" on the song. Azeem Ahmad of musicOMH wrote: "Despite the poignancy of the imagery evoked, ['Hollywood' is] a little bit too contrived, clichéd and poppy. Although the irony of this will (probably) have been deliberate, it's a far cry from the soulful "Do U Wanna Ride" featuring John Legend on a Kanye West production." Michael Endelman of Entertainment Weekly described "Hollywood" as a "brassy, sassy" R&B song with a chorus belonging "in a Vegas revue, not a hip hop album." Caroline Sullivan of The Guardian commented that "Beyoncé leaves her indelible voiceprint" on the song.

== Chart performance ==
"Hollywood" charted on a few US Billboard charts. It entered US Hot R&B/Hip-Hop Songs chart at number 78 on February 17, 2007. On the chart issue dated March 3, 2007, "Hollywood" moved up 26 places from number 72 to number 56, which became its peak on that chart. It was the second greatest gainer that particular week, only behind Knowles' "Listen" (2007), which was released as the lead single off the soundtrack album Dreamgirls: Music from the Motion Picture. "Hollywood" also debuted and peaked at number 21 on the US Hot Rap Songs chart on March 3, 2007 itself.

"Hollywood" made its debut at number 51 on the ARIA Physical Singles Chart and at number 27 on the ARIA Urban Chart on April 23, 2010. The following week, it achieved a high point of number 47 on the Physical Singles chart while remaining at its debut position on the Urban Chart. On May 7, 2007, "Hollywood" made its debut at number 98 on the main ARIA Singles Chart. It also ascended to number 25 on the Urban Chart. The song appeared for one week on the ARIA Singles Chart, for fifteen weeks on the Physical Singles Chart, and for ten weeks on the Urban Chart.

== Track listing ==
- CD single
1. "Hollywood" (radio edit)
2. "Hollywood" (main version)
3. "Hollywood" (instrumental)

== Charts ==
| Chart (2007) | Peak position |
|---|---|
| Australia (ARIA) | 98 |
| Australia Urban (ARIA) | 25 |
| US Hot R&B/Hip-Hop Songs | 56 |
| US Hot Rap Tracks | 21 |
| US Rhythmic Airplay (Billboard) | 36 |
