= Lost One =

Single by Jay-Z featuring Chrisette Michele

from the album Kingdom Come
- Released: November 21, 2006
- Recorded: 2006
- Genre: Hip-hop
- Length: 3:43
- Label: Roc-A-Fella; Def Jam
- Songwriters: Shawn Carter; D. Parker; C. Payne; Mark Batson; Andre Young
- Producers: Dr. Dre; Mark Batson

Jay-Z singles chronology
"Show Me What You Got" (2006)	"Lost One" (2006)	"30 Something" (2007)

Chrisette Michele singles chronology
"Lost One" (2006)	"Can't Forget About You" (2007)

Music video
- "Lost One" on YouTube

"Lost One" is the second single from American rapper Jay-Z for his ninth studio album, Kingdom Come (2006). It was released on November 21, 2006, and peaked at No. 58 on Billboard Hot 100.

Its music video was released on December 4, 2006, Jay-Z's 37th birthday and notably features the rare concept car Maybach Exelero.

== Music and lyrics ==
The song features Chrisette Michele and is produced by Dr. Dre and Mark Batson. The song is composed by S. Carter, D. Parker, C. Payne, M. Batson, and A. Young. Dr. Dre told Scratch magazine in a 2004 interview that he had been studying piano and music theory, like in this song. The beat was used in the 2006 Rap Up by Skillz.

The first verse is rumored to be about Jaz-O, his former mentor, but is also speculated as being about former long-time friend and business partner, Damon Dash, co-founder of Roc-A-Fella Records. In the song Jay-Z states, "I heard motherfuckers saying they made Hov; made Hov say, 'Okay, so, make another Hov.'" Hov refers to his previous stage name Young Hov and the lyrics parallel the history between him and Jaz-O. Jay-Z makes a reference to the film "Casino" with the line: "Shoulda stayed in food and beverage/ Too much flossing/ Too much Sam Rothstein." This reference is viewed by many as commentary on Dash.

The second verse is very arguably about Beyoncé. The opening lyric, "I don't think it's meant to be, B," seems to be addressing the singer by her nickname.

The third verse is about his nephew, Colleek D. Luckie, who died in a car crash involving a Chrysler 300 car, which Jay-Z bought him as a graduation present. In the verse, he mentions Colleek's girlfriend was pregnant when he died. Jay-Z personally blames his nephew's death on himself.

== Charts ==
Chart (2006)	Peak position
US Billboard Hot 100	58
US Hot R&B/Hip-Hop Songs (Billboard)	19
US Hot Rap Songs (Billboard)	10
US Pop 100 (Billboard)	83
US Rhythmic Airplay (Billboard)	32

== Certifications ==
Region	Certification	Certified units/sales
United States (RIAA)	Gold	500,000^{‡}
^{‡} Sales+streaming figures based on certification alone.

== See also ==
- List of songs recorded by Jay-Z
