= Be OK (Chrisette Michele song) =

Single by Chrisette Michele featuring will.i.am

from the album I Am
- Released: December 11, 2007 (single); January 22, 2008 (LP)
- Recorded: 2007
- Genre: R&B; hip hop
- Length: 3:40 (album version); 3:34 (no rap-video version)
- Label: Def Jam
- Songwriters: B. Marley; C. Payne; W. Adams

Chrisette Michele singles chronology
"Best of Me" (2007)	"Be OK" (2007)	"Love Is You" (2007)

will.i.am singles chronology
"Wait a Minute" (2007)	"Be OK" (2007)	"I Want You" (2007)

"Be OK" is the Grammy Award-winning third single from soul-R&B singer-songwriter Chrisette Michele's debut album, I Am released digitally on December 11, 2007. The song features rapper will.i.am and won the Grammy for Best Urban/Alternative Performance.

== Background ==
"Be OK" is an up-tempo soul-contemporary R&B song with influences of hip-hop. The song is about a break-up with a boyfriend and how trying to let go is not easy. It features pop-rap singer will.i.am of The Black Eyed Peas.

== Reception ==
The song received positive reviews. The AV Club says that on "Be OK" and "Let's Rock," Michele plays the upbeat B-girl over Will.I.Am's anthemic boom-bap. AllHipHop has this to say about Be OK:

I Am is the antithesis to any of the albums currently playing on iPods across the land, particularly those drenched in love-scorned tracks and painful riffs. This is a hopeful compilation of songs. Even when Chrisette seems to show the slightest trace of falling apart, it’s still encouraging. Take the Will.I.Am collaborated “Be OK,” where she claims that she doesn’t need to cry when leaving her man.

== Music video ==
At the beginning of the music video, Michele is quarrelling with her boyfriend and tells him to leave and continues in to her car driving off to the mall. She is at the mall with her friends shopping and seems distraught about her breakup. In the video, she is also singing in a black blue silk dress away from the scenery. Will.i.am doesn't make an appearance in this video but instead was replaced another verse by Chrisette Michele. Persia White makes a guest appearance.

== Charts ==
Chart (2008)	Peak position
US Adult R&B Songs (Billboard)	21
US R&B/Hip-Hop Airplay (Billboard)	61

== Release history ==
Region	Date	Label	Format	Catalog
United States	December 11, 2007(single)	Def Jam	Single	001058811
