= Kingdom Come (Jay-Z album) =

Studio album by Jay-Z
- Released: November 21, 2006
- Studios: Baseline Studios (New York City); Sony Music Studios (New York City); Studios 301 (Australia)
- Genre: Hip-hop
- Length: 59:21
- Labels: Roc-A-Fella; Island Def Jam
- Producers: B-Money; Mark Batson; DJ Khalil; Dr. Dre; Just Blaze; The Neptunes; Chris Martin; Rik Simpson; Swizz Beatz; Syience; Kanye West

Jay-Z chronology
Collision Course (2004)	Kingdom Come (2006)	American Gangster (2007)

Singles from Kingdom Come
- 1. "Show Me What You Got" Released: October 30, 2006; 2. "Lost One" Released: December 4, 2006; 3. "30 Something" Released: January 9, 2007; 4. "Hollywood" Released: January 23, 2007

Kingdom Come is the ninth studio album by American rapper Jay-Z. It was released on November 21, 2006, through Roc-A-Fella Records and The Island Def Jam Music Group. It was considered a "comeback album" for the rapper, as 2003's The Black Album was promoted as his final release. The production on the album was handled by multiple producers including Just Blaze, DJ Khalil, Dr. Dre, The Neptunes, Swizz Beatz and Kanye West among others. The album also features guest appearances by John Legend, Beyoncé, Usher, Ne-Yo and more.

Kingdom Come was supported to four singles: "Show Me What You Got", "Lost One", "30 Something" and "Hollywood". The album received generally lukewarm reviews from music critics but was a commercial success. It debuted at number one on the US Billboard 200, selling 680,000 copies in its first week. At the 50th Annual Grammy Awards, Jay-Z earned a nomination for Best Rap Album.

== Background ==
Kingdom Come was the first Jay-Z album released since 2003's The Black Album, which had been widely hyped as Jay-Z's "retirement" album. The video for that album's hit single "99 Problems" had ended with Jay-Z going down in a hail of gunfire. Jay-Z stated in interviews that that scene represented the "death" of Jay-Z and the "rebirth" of Shawn Carter. Because of this, Jay-Z had originally planned to release Kingdom Come under his real name of Shawn Carter, but decided in the end to release it under his more-famous stage name Jay-Z. The album's second single, "Lost One" (produced by Dr. Dre) addresses Jay's split with Roc-A-Fella co-founder Damon Dash, the death of his nephew, and supposedly his relationship with actress Rosario Dawson.

Past collaborators Kanye West and particularly Just Blaze made significant contributions to the album's production. This is the first time Dr. Dre has played a substantial role in a Jay-Z album, as he produced four beats and mixed every song on the album. Relatively unknown newcomers B-Money, Syience, and DJ Khalil also contributed to the album's production, as well as Coldplay lead singer Chris Martin. Kingdom Come's opening track "The Prelude" features additional vocals from Pain in da Ass who featured on some of Jay-Z's earlier album introductions, impersonating characters from films such as Scarface, Goodfellas, and Carlito's Way.

== Critical reception ==
Professional ratings
Aggregate scores
Source	Rating
Metacritic	67/100
Review scores
Source	Rating
AllMusic	2.5/5 stars
The A.V. Club	B+
Entertainment Weekly	B
The Guardian	4/5 stars
Los Angeles Times	2.5/4 stars
NME	8/10
Pitchfork	5/10
Rolling Stone	3.5/5 stars
Uncut	3/5 stars
USA Today	3/4 stars

Kingdom Come received generally lukewarm reviews from music critics. According to the review aggregator Metacritic, Kingdom Come received "generally favorable reviews" based on a weighted average score of 67 out of 100 from 23 critic scores. According to Pitchfork journalist Peter Macia, "the early consensus on Kingdom Come [was] that it's one of Jay-Z's worst albums." He praised the song "Minority Report" writing "It's the only song on Kingdom Come that offers any real insight into the unique position Jay-Z is in, and possibly the only one that anyone will care to remember." Reviewing the record for Rolling Stone, Rob Sheffield said "the highs are really high, and the lows are really low", particularly applauding the title track and "Trouble" while finding "Beach Chair" especially awful. Nathan Rabin wrote in The A.V. Club that contrary to the hype leading up to its release, Kingdom Come was "just another solid album" from a rapper who now "succeeds on craft and hard-won experience rather than hunger", finding it devoid of the urgent sense his previous records displayed. Robert Christgau gave it an honorable mention in his MSN Music consumer guide, naming "30 Something" and "Minority Report" as highlights while writing that Jay-Z was enjoying "the pleasures of going legit". In The New York Times, Kelefa Sanneh deemed Kingdom Come an intriguing but "halfway successful" attempt by "a grown-up rapper trying to make a grown-up album". AllMusic editor Andy Kellman was more critical, dismissing the record as "a display of complacency and retreads — a gratuitous, easily resistible victory lap — that very slightly upgrades the relative worth of The Blueprint²." Jay-Z later considered it to be his worst album.

In the 10th anniversary, Preezy Brown from Vibe write an article about the album and said: "Kingdom Come was stacked to the brim with all of the bells and whistles to compensate for any rust on the part of Hov, but ultimately would not be enough to mask the album's blemishes." They singled out "The Prelude" ("One of the superior intros in Hov's catalog"), "Lost Ones" ("one of the more heartfelt and transparent tunes of his career"), "Do U Wanna Ride" ("an open letter to former street associate-turned-inmate Emory Jones, Jay Z shows glimpses of the greatness that set him apart"), "I Made It" ("Another brief moment of brilliance on Kingdom Come, which is dedicated to the accomplishment of his mama proud") and the last two songs, "Minority Report" (one of the more unsung compositions in Jay Z's career and a stellar example of his underrated social commentary") and "Beach Chair" (an intense sonic affair that finds Jay Z reflecting on his past, present, and future, and is among the best work found on his first post-retirement album) as highlights. He said "both of which see Hov venturing outside of his comfort zone with favorable results."

The song Minority Report received further notice from hip-hop fans and critics alike especially for its production and its message. Mitch Findlay from HNHH said: "While Kingdom Come as an album is oft-maligned, largely viewed as a mediocre comeback album, there are some gems to be found. The best of which is Minority Report, an elegiac reflection on the aftermath of Hurricane Katrina. Jay is at his most somber, spitting poetry rich with images, lamenting the mistreatment from government and former Commander-In-Chief George Bush. The pattern of A-List producers continues with Dr. Dre at the boards, and Ne-yo closes off the track with a haunting, powerful refrain - “seems like we don’t even care”." The Spin staff also singled out the song as one of the high-lists on the album: "It’s not the best track to listen to on a purely aesthetic basis, with Jay rapping in a stilted flow over a plodding piano beat. But the song stands out for both its incisiveness and its honesty." and called it "one of his most interesting bits of rapping ever". Adam Aziz from Vibe Magazine considered the song as one Jay-Z’s most underrated songs and said: “The song contains some of Jay’s most meaningful bars, including one of the truest ever spoken on record at the onset of the song – “People was poor before the hurricane came…”“ At the 50th Annual Grammy Awards, Kingdom Come received a nomination for Best Rap Album; the award was won by Kanye West for his 2007 album Graduation.

== Commercial performance ==
Kingdom Come debuted at number one on the US Billboard 200 chart, selling 680,000 copies in its first week, according to Nielsen Soundscan. This became Jay-Z's ninth US number one album and tied him with the Rolling Stones for the third most number-one albums in the US. In its second week, the album dropped to number six on the chart, selling an additional 140,000 copies. On December 14, 2006, the album certified double platinum by the Recording Industry Association of America (RIAA) for shipments of two million copies. As of August 2009, the album has sold 1,510,000 copies in the United States, according to Nielsen SoundScan.

== Track listing ==
Standard edition
No.	Title	Writer(s)	Producer(s)	Length
1.	"The Prelude"	Shawn Carter; Brian Hughes; Mark James	B-Money	2:44
2.	"Oh My God"	Carter; Justin Smith; Gregg Allman	Just Blaze	4:17
3.	"Kingdom Come"	Carter; J. Smith; Rick James; Alonzo Miller; Lawrence Parker	Just Blaze	4:23
4.	"Show Me What You Got"	Carter; J. Smith; Johnny Pate; Eric Sadler; Carlton Ridenhour; James Boxley; Michael McEwan	Just Blaze	3:43
5.	"Lost One" (featuring Chrisette Michele)	Carter; Andre Young; Mark Batson; Dawaun Parker; Chrisette Payne	Dr. Dre; Batson	3:44
6.	"Do U Wanna Ride" (featuring John Legend)	Carter; Kanye West; John Stephens	Kanye West	5:29
7.	"30 Something"	Carter; Young; Batson; Parker	Dr. Dre	4:13
8.	"I Made It"	Carter; Khalil Abdul-Rahman; Dontae Winslow	DJ Khalil	3:25
9.	"Anything" (featuring Usher and Pharrell)	Carter; Pharrell Williams	The Neptunes	4:21
10.	"Hollywood" (featuring Beyoncé)	Carter; Reginald Perry; Shaffer Smith	Syience; Ne-Yo	4:17
11.	"Trouble"	Carter; Young; Batson; Parker; Che Pope	Dr. Dre; Batson	4:53
12.	"Dig a Hole" (featuring Sterling Simms)	Carter; Kasseem Dean; Sean Garrett	Swizz Beatz	4:11
13.	"Minority Report" (featuring Ne-Yo)	Carter; Young; Batson; Parker; J. Smith; Ernesto De Curtis; Domenico Furnò	Dr. Dre	4:33
14.	"Beach Chair" (featuring Chris Martin)	Carter; Chris E. Martin; Rik Simpson	Chris Martin; Simpson	5:08

Limited edition bonus track
No.	Title	Writer(s)	Length
15.	"44 Fours" (Live from Radio City Music Hall)	Carter; Lou Reed	3:35

Bonus disc – live from Radio City Music Hall
No.	Title	Length
1.	"Politics as Usual"	4:17
2.	"Can't Knock the Hustle" (featuring Beyoncé)	6:34
3.	"Can I Live"	5:00

Samples credits

- "The Prelude" contains a sample of "Keep the Faith" by Mel & Tim.
- "Oh My God" contains a sample of "Whipping Post" by Genya Ravan.
- "Kingdom Come" contains samples of "Super Freak" by Rick James and "100 Guns" by Boogie Down Productions.
- "Show Me What You Got" contains samples of "Shaft in Africa" by Johnny Pate, "Show 'Em Whatcha Got" by Public Enemy, "Darkest Light" by Lafayette Afro Rock Band and "Rump Shaker" by Wreckx-n-Effect.
- "Minority Report" contains a sample of "Non Ti Scordar Di Me" by Luciano Pavarotti.
- "44 Fours" contains a sample of "Can I Kick It?" by A Tribe Called Quest.

== Personnel ==
Adapted from AllMusic.

- Jason Agel – assistant engineer
- Kenneth "Bam" Alexander – drums
- June Ambrose – stylist
- Angelo Aponte – engineer
- B-Money – production
- Mark Batson – keyboards, producer
- Beyoncé – featured vocals (track 10)
- David Brown – engineer, tracking
- Jonny Buckland – guitar
- Tim Carr – assistant
- Chrisette Michele – featured artist (track 5)
- Sean Cruse – bass, guitar
- Tony Dawsey – mastering
- Andrew Dawson – engineer
- Dr. Dre – production
- Larrance Dopson – piano
- Lamar Edwards – Hammond organ
- Jacob Gabriel – assistant engineer
- Jay-Z – primary artist, executive producer
- Terese Joseph – A&R
- Doug Joswick – package production
- Just Blaze – production, drums, keyboards, mixing, producer
- John Legend – featured artist (track 6)
- Ari Levine – assistant engineer
- Anthony Mandler – photography
- Louis Marino – creative director
- Chris Martin – featured artist (track 14)
- Medi Med – engineer
- Shaun Mykals – vox organ
- Ne-Yo – featured artist (track 13)
- The Neptunes – production
- Dawaun Parker – keyboards
- Che Pope – keyboards
- Robert "Roomio" Reyes – assistant engineer
- Daniel Seeff – bass
- Sterling Simms – featured artist (track 12)
- Swizz Beatz – producer
- Usher – featured artist (track 9)
- Patrick Viala – mixing
- Kanye West – production
- Ryan West – engineer, mixing
- Pharrell Williams – featured artist (track 9)
- Dontae Winslow – arranger, horn, organ, vox organ, Wurlitzer
- Mashica Winslow – arranger

== Charts ==
=== Weekly charts ===
Chart (2006)	Peak position
Australian Albums (ARIA)	95
Dutch Albums (Album Top 100)	71
French Albums (SNEP)	79
German Albums (Offizielle Top 100)	76
Irish Albums (IRMA)	40
Italian Albums (FIMI)	67
Scottish Albums (Official Charts)	41
Swedish Albums (Sverigetopplistan)	45
Swiss Albums (Schweizer Hitparade)	17
Taiwanese Albums (Five Music)	2
UK Albums (Official Charts)	35
US Billboard 200	1
US Top R&B/Hip-Hop Albums (Billboard)	1
US Top Rap Albums (Billboard)	1

=== Year-end charts ===
Chart (2007)	Position
US Billboard 200	20
US Top R&B/Hip-Hop Albums (Billboard)	1

== Certifications ==
Region	Certification	Certified units/sales
Canada (Music Canada)	Platinum	100,000^{^}
United Kingdom (BPI)	Gold	100,000^{*}
United States (RIAA)	2× Platinum	2,000,000^{^}
^{*} Sales figures based on certification alone.^{^} Shipments figures based on certification alone.

== See also ==
- List of number-one albums of 2006 (U.S.)
- List of number-one R&B albums of 2006 (U.S.)
