= Best of Me (Chrisette Michele song) =

Single by Chrisette Michele

from the album I Am
- Released: 2007
- Recorded: 2007
- Genre: R&B; jazz
- Length: 3:52
- Label: The Island Def Jam Music Group
- Songwriter(s): Babyface & C. Payne

Chrisette Michele singles chronology
"If I Have My Way" (2007)	"Best of Me" (2007)	"Be OK" (2007)

"Best of Me" (also known as "The Best of Me") is the second single from the Chrisette Michele album, I Am. It has not received much attention on the charts, although it was added to the VH1 video lineup. An unplugged version of the song was featured on the VH1 website.

== Credits and personnel ==
Credits adapted from Discogs and Allmusic.

- Chrisette Michele: vocals, writer, composer
- Babyface: writer, composer, producer, keyboards and drum programming, acoustic guitar
- Rob Lewis: strings arranger, keyboards
- The Movement Orchestra: strings
- Christopher Johnson and Robert Smith: drums
- Paul Boutin: recording engineer
- Jon Gass: mixing engineer
