= Epiphany (Chrisette Michele song) =

2009 single by Chrisette Michele

Single by Chrisette Michele

from the album Epiphany
- Released: January 27, 2009
- Recorded: 2008
- Genre: Soul; R&B
- Length: 3:31
- Label: Def Jam
- Songwriter(s): Shaffer Smith; Chuck Harmony
- Producer(s): Chuck Harmony

Chrisette Michele singles chronology
"Love Is You" (2008)	"Epiphany" (2009)	"Blame It on Me" (2009)

"Epiphany" (also known as "Epiphany (I'm Leaving)") is the first single from American singer-songwriter Chrisette Michele's second studio album of the same name, released for airplay on January 27, 2009. It was an R&B top 20 hit and is her most successful single to date. It also marked her first solo entry on the Billboard Hot 100 chart, where it peaked at No. 89.

== Background ==
"Epiphany" is about relationship experiences. Michele explained: "I heard the song that Ne-Yo had written titled 'Epiphany', and the word just stood out to me. It stood out to me because I'd been through a lot in my last relationship, and the word 'epiphany' exemplified exactly what happened in the end when I realized I didn't have to put myself through it anymore." Michele references the relationship with her former manager, Douglas "Biggs" Ellison, who Michele sued for embezzlement and harassment. Charges that were later dropped.

== Critical reception ==
Michael Menachem of Billboard magazine said "'Epiphany (I'm Leaving)' signals a more hip, funky approach for the Long Island native, melding Michele's fresh jazz tone with a trippy bassline and girl group backup vocals." The Koalition commented on how "Michele breezes through the pastoral-influenced production, crooning 'I'm leaving' to a cheating lover that she feels has deprived her living her life." Mark Edward Nero of About.com said that the mid-tempo song is Michele's declaration of independence.

== Music video ==
The video features Michele singing in her apartment with clips of her and her boyfriend, played by Canadian rapper Drake, shown in between. During the bridge, Michele performs on top of the apartment building at daybreak, followed by scenes of her packing her boyfriend's things and throwing them out during the final chorus.

=== Reception ===
Maiya Norton of Vibe said Michele "exudes a little bit of diva as her bold new look complements her new attitude. With a chopped haircut and smoldering eyes, she kicks rapper Drake to the curb proclaiming, 'I think I'm just about over being your girlfriend. I'm leaving.' And she's downright convincing as she tosses his clothes into the dumpster. It's as though personal experience has caused a light bulb to flicker in her mind, and that wisdom echoes throughout 'Epiphany'."

BET placed the video at No. 46 on its Notarized: Top 100 Videos of 2009 countdown.

== Charts ==
=== Weekly charts ===
Chart (2009)	Peak position
US Billboard Hot 100	89
US Hot R&B/Hip-Hop Songs	14
US Hot Dance Club Play	40

=== Year-end charts ===
Chart (2009)	Position
US Hot R&B/Hip-Hop Songs (Billboard)	44

== Release history ==
Region	Date	Label	Format	Catalog
United States	January 27, 2009 (Airplay); February 24, 2009 (Digital download)	Def Jam	Airplay, Digital download	
