= Hip Hop Is Dead =

Studio album by Nas
- Released: December 19, 2006
- Recorded: 2005–2006
- Genre: Hip-hop
- Length: 60:27
- Labels: The Jones Experience; Columbia; Def Jam
- Producers: Nas; Chris Webber; Devo Springsteen; Dr. Dre; Kanye West; L.E.S.; Mark Batson; Salaam Remi; Scott Storch; Stargate; will.i.am; Wyldfyer

Nas chronology
| Street's Disciple (2004) | Hip Hop Is Dead (2006) | Untitled (2008) |

Singles from Hip Hop Is Dead
- 1. "Hip Hop Is Dead" Released: November 5, 2006; 2. "Can't Forget About You" Released: January 23, 2007

Hip Hop Is Dead is the eighth studio album by American rapper Nas, released December 19, 2006, on Def Jam Recordings. His first album for the label, it was co-financed by Nas's previous label, Columbia Records, which once distributed for Def Jam. The album's title was inspired by Nas's view of the music industry and the state of hip hop music at the time. The album features appearances from Nas's then-wife Kelis, Def Jam label-mates Kanye West, Jay-Z, and Chrisette Michele, as well as will.i.am, Snoop Dogg, and The Game, among others.

The album debuted at number one on the U.S. Billboard 200 chart, selling 355,880 copies in its first week. His fourth U.S. number-one album, it had sold 785,000 copies by March 2014, eventually over time it went gold by the RIAA. Upon its release, Hip Hop Is Dead received generally positive reviews from most music critics. Hip Hop Is Dead was nominated for a Grammy Award for Best Rap Album, ultimately losing to Kanye West's Graduation at the 50th Grammy Awards.

== Background ==
Nas announced the album's title after a performance on May 18, 2006. In a late September interview on English DJ Tim Westwood's Radio show, Nas said, "Hip-hop is dead because we as artists no longer have the power." He went on to say, "Could you imagine what 50 Cent could be doing, Nas, Jay, Eminem, if we were the Jimmy Iovines? Could you imagine the power we'd have? I think that's where we're headed." He has described the album as a mixture of "street" records, "political" records and collaborations. In another interview for MTV.com, Nas discussed the concept of the album title and the social atmosphere and condition of the music industry that inspired it, stating:

When I say 'hip-hop is dead', basically America is dead. There is no political voice. Music is dead ... Our way of thinking is dead, our commerce is dead. Everything in this society has been done. It's like a slingshot, where you throw the muthafucka back and it starts losing speed and is about to fall down. That's where we are as a country ... what I mean by 'hip-hop is dead' is we're at a vulnerable state. If we don't change, we gonna disappear like Rome. I think hip-hop could help rebuild America, once hip-hoppers own hip-hop ... We are our own politicians, our own government, we have something to say.

— Nas

A promo single, "Where Y'all At", was released in June 2006 and produced by Salaam Remi. It contained a sample from Nas' "Made You Look", but it did not make the final cut for Hip Hop Is Dead. It was, however, released as a bonus track on the Japanese import version of the album.

A music video for "Can't Forget About You" premiered on February 5, 2007, the song featuring Chrisette Michele and sampling Nat King Cole's song "Unforgettable". Another video, "Hustlers", featuring The Game, followed.

=== Title controversy ===
In an interview on the music television show 106 & Park, while promoting his untitled 2008 album, Nas said that he chose "Hip Hop Is Dead" as the title of the album in order to engender excitement and a reaction among hip hop artists. He went on to say that it worked, due to reactions from artists like Lil Wayne and Kanye West (whether West was actually reacting to the title of the album or merely promoting the album is unclear, given that he produced on two of the album's tracks). The title had a major impact in the hip hop world, especially for Southern hip hop, whose artists were blamed at the time for cheapening the quality of hip-hop with crunk and snap music. Southern rapper Young Jeezy had made statements against the title of Nas' album, and also furthered his comments by questioning Nas' street credibility. They have since reconciled, with Nas appearing on Jeezy's 2008 single, "My President". Many other Southern rappers such as Ludacris, Trick Daddy, and Big Boi (whose fellow Outkast member, Andre 3000, declared hip hop dead on 2001's "Funkin' Around", off Big Boi and Dre Present...Outkast) have also attacked Nas' album title claiming that it is targeted at Southern hip hop. Nas also has a fair share of supporters such as fellow New York rappers KRS-One, DMX, Raekwon, and Ghostface Killah.

== Critical reception ==
Professional ratings
Aggregate scores
| Source | Rating |
|---|---|
| Metacritic | 79/100 |
Review scores
| Source | Rating |
| AllMusic | 3.5/5 stars |
| Entertainment Weekly | (B) |
| The Guardian | 4/5 stars |
| MSN Music (Consumer Guide) | A− |
| The New York Times | (favorable) |
| Pitchfork Media | (7.8/10) |
| PopMatters | (8/10) |
| Rolling Stone | 4/5 stars |
| USA Today | 3.5/4 stars |
| The Village Voice | (favorable) |

Hip Hop Is Dead received generally positive reviews from most music critics. At Metacritic, which assigns a normalized rating out of 100 to reviews from mainstream critics, the album received an average score of 79, based on 22 reviews, which indicates "generally favorable reviews". Nas is hip-hop's "grumpiest man", according to Jody Rosen for Entertainment Weekly, and the album "is a lot like Nas himself: impossible not to admire, but hard to love". Among those music writers and critics that reviewed Hip Hop Is Dead favorably was Jason Rubin of The A.V. Club, which gave the album an A− rating. Rubin praised the album's production quality and lyrical concept, and stated "Hip Hop is unsparing in its diagnosis of rap's ills, but ultimately, it's hopeful. It contains a smart, tight, cohesive analysis of where rap went astray, but also the seeds of the genre's rebirth and renewal."

Despite perceiving its sound and musical quality as weaknesses, Los Angeles Times writer Soren Baker gave it 3 out of 4 stars and wrote "Nas demonstrates why he remains one of rap's most revered artists, as his defense of hip-hop culture is impassioned and informed, if not fully realized". Sean Fennessey of Vibe called the album "disorienting and sometimes brilliant" and complimented its "bold, startling production and a renewed lyrical vigor". The album was nominated for a Grammy Award for Best Rap Album, losing to Kanye West's Graduation (2007), at the 50th Grammy Awards in February 2008.

== Commercial performance ==
Hip Hop Is Dead debuted at number one on the US Billboard 200, selling 355,880 copies in its first week. The album has joined It Was Written (1996) and I Am… (1999) as Nas's third album to debut at number one on the chart. In its second week, the album dropped to number four on the chart, selling an additional 101,000 copies. In its third week, the album dropped to number eight on the chart, selling 44,800 copies that week. On March 12, 2007, the album was certified gold by the Recording Industry Association of America (RIAA) for sales of over 500,000 copies in the United States.

The title track "Hip Hop Is Dead" (produced by will.i.am), contained samples from "In-A-Gadda-Da-Vida" by Iron Butterfly, "Apache" by Incredible Bongo Band (which Nas previously used on "Made You Look"), and Billy Squier's "The Big Beat", and was released as the first single from the album. It received airplay on radio stations in Australia (Triple J), the UK, and in United States, notably on Hot 97. The single recently reached #48 on the Hot R&B/Hip-Hop Songs chart and #41 on the Billboard Hot 100. The second single from the album Hip Hop Is Dead is "Can't Forget About You" (Featuring Chrisette Michele). It contains a sample from Nat King Cole's "Unforgettable".

== Track listing ==
Information is based on Liner Notes.

| No. | Title | Producer(s) | Length |
|---|---|---|---|
| 1. | "Money Over Bullshit" | L.E.S.; Wyldfyer | 4:16 |
| 2. | "You Can't Kill Me" | L.E.S.; Al West | 3:14 |
| 3. | "Carry on Tradition" | Scott Storch | 3:49 |
| 4. | "Where Are They Now" | Nas; Salaam Remi | 2:44 |
| 5. | "Hip Hop Is Dead" (featuring will.i.am) | will.i.am | 3:45 |
| 6. | "Who Killed It?" | Salaam Remi; will.i.am | 3:10 |
| 7. | "Black Republican" (featuring Jay-Z) | L.E.S.; Wyldfyer | 3:45 |
| 8. | "Not Going Back" (featuring Kelis) | Stargate | 4:09 |
| 9. | "Still Dreaming" (featuring Kanye West and Chrisette Michele) | Kanye West | 3:37 |
| 10. | "Hold Down the Block" | Mark Batson | 3:58 |
| 11. | "Blunt Ashes" | Chris Webber | 4:03 |
| 12. | "Let There Be Light" (featuring Tre Williams) | Kanye West; Devo Springsteen^{[a]} | 4:28 |
| 13. | "Play on Playa" (featuring Snoop Dogg) | Scott Storch | 3:33 |
| 14. | "Can't Forget About You" (featuring Chrisette Michele) | will.i.am | 4:34 |
| 15. | "Hustlers" (featuring The Game and Marsha Ambrosius) | Dr. Dre | 4:06 |
| 16. | "Hope" (featuring Chrisette Michele) | L.E.S.; Nas; Alexander "Spanador" Mosely | 3:05 |
| Total length: | | | 60:27 |

Bonus tracks
| No. | Title | Producer(s) | Length |
|---|---|---|---|
| 17. | "Shine On" (iTunes pre-order) | Salaam Remi | 2:42 |
| 18. | "The N (Don't Hate Me Now)" (United Kingdom and Circuit City) | Salaam Remi | 2:48 |
| 19. | "Where Y'all At" (Best Buy) | Salaam Remi | 4:09 |
| Total length: | | | 70:06 |

Notes

- ^{^[a]} signifies a co-producer.

== Personnel ==
Unless otherwise indicated, Information is based on Liner Notes.

| # | Title | Notes |
|---|---|---|
| | Hip Hop Is Dead | Executive producer: Nasir Jones; A&R: Jay Brown; A&R for Ill Will Music Group: Mike Brinkley; A&R Administration: Terese Joseph; A&R Coordination: Fabienne Leys; Marketing: Tracey Waples; Marketing coordination: Shari Bryant; Management: Michael "Blue" Williams for Family Tree Entertainment; Mastering: Chris Gehringer at Sterling Sound, NYC; Mixing: Dylan "3-D" Dresdow at Paper V.U. Studios, LA; Photography: Afshin Shahidi; Creative direction: Andy West; Cover design: Tavon Sampson; Wardrobe: Mike Bogard for The B Lynn Group; Photo and art coordination: Nichell Delavaille; Package production: Doug Joswick; Legal representation: Kenny Meiselas, Esq. and Paul Rothenberg, Esq. Sample clearance agent: Deborah Mannis-Gardner for DMG Clearances, Inc. Business Affairs: Michael Seltzer, Antoinette Trotman, Ian Allen |
| 1 | "Money Over Bullshit" | Songwriters: N. Jones, L. Lewis, W. Coleman; Additional Instruments: L.E.S. & Wyldfyer |
| 2 | "You Can't Kill Me" | Songwriters: N. Jones, L. Lewis, A. West; Sample: "Sly" by Herbie Hancock and the Headhunters; Additional Instruments: Al West |
| 3 | "Carry on Tradition" | Songwriters: N. Jones, S. Storch; All Instruments: Scott Storch |
| 4 | "Where Are They Now" | Songwriters: N. Jones, S. Gibbs, J. Brown, B. Byrd, R. Lehnhoff; Sample: "Get Up, Get into It, Get Involved" by James Brown; Sample: “Set It Off" by Big Daddy Kane |
| 5 | "Hip Hop Is Dead" | Songwriters: N. Jones, W. Adams, J. Lordan, D. Ingle; Samples: "Apache" and “In-A-Gadda-Da-Vida”, both by Michael Viner & The Incredible Bongo Band; Sample: "In-A-Gadda-Da-Vida" by Iron Butterfly; Sample: "The Big Beat" as performed by Billy Squier; Additional Drums, Drum Machine, Farfisa organ & Keyboards: will.i.am |
| 6 | "Who Killed It?" | Songwriters: N. Jones, S. Gibbs, W. Adams; Sample: "I Ain't No Joke" by Eric B. & Rakim; Drums, Bass & Keyboards: Salaam Remi; Flute, Soprano Saxophone & Clarinet: Vincent Henry; Bass Trumpet, Flugelhorn & Trumpet: Bruce Purse; French Horn: W. Marshall Sealy; Cello: Patrice Jackson; Viola: Adam Hill; Violin: Naira Underwood |
| 7 | "Black Republican" | Songwriters: N. Jones, S. Carter, L. Lewis, W. Coleman, C. Coppala; Sample: "Marcia Religiosa" by City of Prague Philharmonic |
| 8 | "Not Going Back" | Songwriters: N. Jones, T. Hermansen, M. Ericksen, K. Roger-Jones; Sample: “Alone" by Heart. |
| 9 | "Still Dreaming" | Songwriters: N. Jones, K. West, C. Payne, C. Ernst-Wells; Sample: "The Interim" by Diana Ross ”The Interim” written by Cheryl Ernst-Wells; Sample: "Use Me" by Bill Withers |
| 10 | "Hold Down the Block" | Songwriters: N. Jones, M. Batson; Drums, Bass & Keyboards: Mark Batson; Saxophone: Leroi Moore; Vocals: Mark B. Mayfield |
| 11 | "Blunt Ashes" | Songwriters: N. Jones, M. Webber; Sample: "Mercy Mercy Me (The Ecology)” by Marvin Gaye; Additional Instruments: Chris Webber |
| 12 | "Let There Be Light" | Songwriters: N. Jones, K. West, T. Williams, D. Harris, P. Cho; Sample: "Take The Money And Run" by Steve Miller Band; Drums: Mark Biondi; Keyboards: Paul Cho |
| 13 | "Play on Playa" | Songwriters: N. Jones, S. Storch, C. Broadus, M. Gaye, L. Ware, A. Ross; Sample: "After the Dance" by Marvin Gaye |
| 14 | "Can't Forget About You" | Songwriters: N. Jones, W. Adams, C. Payne, I. Gordon; Sample: "Unforgettable" by Nat King Cole; Drums, Drum Programming & Keyboards: will.i.am |
| 15 | "Hustlers" | Songwriters: N. Jones, J. Taylor, M. Ambrosius, A. Young, M. Elizondo; Keyboards: Mike Elizondo & Lionel "LJ" Holoman; Bass played by LJ Holoman; Additional Vocals: Jaramye Daniels |
| 16 | "Hope" | Songwriters: N. Jones, L. Lewis; Additional Vocals: Chrisette Michele |
| * | "Shine On" | Songwriters: N. Jones, S. Gibbs |
| * | "The N (Don't Hate Me Now)" | Songwriters: N. Jones, S. Gibbs |
| * | "Where Y'all At" | Songwriters: N. Jones, S. Gibbs, C. Stepney, R. Rudolph; Sample: "Made You Look" by Nas; Sample: "Rainy Day in Centreville" by Minnie Riperton |

== Charts ==
=== Weekly charts ===
Weekly chart performance for Hip-Hop Is Dead
| Chart (2006) | Peak position |
|---|---|
| Australian Albums (ARIA) | 50 |
| Belgian Albums (Ultratop Flanders) | 43 |
| Belgian Albums (Ultratop Wallonia) | 76 |
| Dutch Albums (Album Top 100) | 95 |
| French Albums (SNEP) | 89 |
| Japanese Album (Oricon) | 30 |
| Swiss Albums (Schweizer Hitparade) | 22 |
| UK Albums (Official Charts) | 68 |
| US Billboard 200 | 1 |
| US Top R&B/Hip-Hop Albums (Billboard) | 1 |
| US Top Rap Albums (Billboard) | 1 |

=== Year-end charts ===
Year-end chart performance for Hip-Hop Is Dead
| Chart (2007) | Peak position |
|---|---|
| US Billboard 200 | 64 |
| US Top R&B/Hip-Hop Albums (Billboard) | 14 |
| US Top Rap Albums (Billboard) | 7 |

== Certifications ==
| Region | Certification | Certified units/sales |
|---|---|---|
| United Kingdom (BPI) | Silver | 60,000^{*} |
| United States (RIAA) | Gold | 500,000^{^} |
^{*} Sales figures based on certification alone.^{^} Shipments figures based on certification alone.

== Release history ==
Release history for Hip Hop Is Dead
| Region | Date |
|---|---|
| Ireland | December 15, 2006 |
| United Kingdom | December 18, 2006 |
| United States | December 19, 2006 |
