= Can't Forget About You =

Single by Nas featuring Chrisette Michele

from the album Hip Hop Is Dead
- Released: January 23, 2007
- Recorded: 2006
- Genre: Hip hop, jazz rap
- Label: Def Jam, Columbia
- Songwriters: Nasir Jones; William Adams, Jr. Chrisette Payne; Irving Gordon
- Producer: will.i.am

Nas singles chronology
"Hip Hop Is Dead" (2006)	"Can't Forget About You" (2007)	"Classic (Better Than I've Ever Been)" (2007)

Chrisette Michele singles chronology
"Lost One" (2006)	"Can't Forget About You" (2007)	"If I Have My Way" (2007)

"Can't Forget About You" is the second and final single from American hip hop artist Nas' 2006 album Hip Hop Is Dead, released on January 23, 2007. It features Chrisette Michele, and the track is produced by will.i.am. Its lyrics deal with Nas reciting various unforgettable memories such as Mr. T becoming a wrestler and when DJ Jazzy Jeff & The Fresh Prince won the first Rap Grammy. Its b-side is "Hustlers" featuring The Game and Marsha from Floetry. It features a sample of "Unforgettable by Nat King Cole. The song reached number forty-six on the Hot R&B/Hip-Hop Singles & Tracks chart, making it, to date, his highest charting R&B song since "I Can" peaked at 7 in 2003.

== Music video ==
The director for the music video is Chris Robinson. Appearances were made by Michele, producer L.E.S., and Natalie Cole. Natalie Cole appeared in tribute to her father Nat King Cole whose song "Unforgettable" is sampled in "Can't Forget About You". On December 31, 2007, the music video appeared at number 90 on BET's Notarized: Top 100 Videos of 2007 countdown.

== Charts ==
Chart (2007)	Peak position
US Hot R&B/Hip-Hop Songs (Billboard)	46
