= I Am (Chrisette Michele album) =

Studio album by Chrisette Michele
- Released: June 19, 2007
- Studios: Brandon's Way Recording, The Underlab, The Record Plant (Los Angeles, California); Chung King Studios, The Cutting Room, Legacy Recording Studios, Sony Music Studios (New York City, New York); Housing the Hits (Freeport, New York); Mixdown Recording Studios (Yonkers, New York); Instrument Zoo (Miami, Florida); WoodaWorx Productions (Huntsville, Alabama)
- Genres: R&B; soul; jazz
- Length: 56:25
- Label: Def Jam
- Producers: Chrisette Michele; Babyface; John Legend; will.i.am; Kelvin Wooten; GI Joe; Mo Jaz; Kevin Randolph; David Lee Stewart; Salaam Remi

Chrisette Michele chronology
I Am (2007)	Epiphany (2009)

Singles from I Am
- 1. "If I Have My Way" Released: May 2007; 2. "Best of Me" Released: July 6, 2007; 3. "Be OK" Released: December 11, 2007; 4. "Love Is You" Released: April 2008

I Am is the debut studio album by American R&B singer Chrisette Michele, released in the United States on June 19, 2007, by Def Jam Recordings. The album's third single, "Be OK", won the 2009 Grammy Award for Best Urban/Alternative Performance.

== Production ==
Michele began working on the music that would make up I Am before she had a recording contract, and started promoting her work by visiting events for independent artists. During this time, she caught the attention of L.A. Reid, who later signed her to Island Def Jam, where she got support from producers such as Babyface, will.i.am, and John Legend.

The video for the album's lead single "If I Have My Way" premiered on VH1 Soul. The video for her second single "Best of Me" premiered on July 6, 2007, on Yahoo! Music, and was later added to VH1's video rotation. "Be OK", which features will.i.am, was released as the third single from the album, whose music video was on BET's 106 & Park on December 18, 2007. "Love Is You" was the fourth and final single and was released in 2008.

== Reception ==
Professional ratings
Review scores
Source	Rating
AllMusic	4/5 stars
The A.V. Club	B
Christgau's Consumer Guide	(2-star Honorable Mention)
PopMatters	5/10
USA Today	3.5/4 stars

I Am generally mixed reviews from music critics. Andy Kellman of AllMusic praised I Am for successfully blending vintage soul influences with contemporary R&B, highlighting Michele's distinctive vocals and versatility, while Nathan Rabin of The A.V. Club similarly commended its mix of upbeat neo-soul and intimate ballads, noting that Michele's voice remained compelling over both energetic and stripped-back arrangements. Ebony described I Am as an "impressive debut," praising Michele's "captivating jazzy-soulful vocals" and calling it "a winning set of tunes" that showcased her talents as a singer, songwriter, and composer. Billboard editor Clover Hope also lauded the album's "classy" and understated approach, highlighting Michele's "warm, scratchy vocals" and vintage-inspired style, while suggesting it could have benefited from more upbeat material. Steve Jones of USA Today gave I Am a three-and-a-half-star rating, highlighting her "soul-drenched vocals," mature songwriting, and blend of jazz, swing, gospel, and adult contemporary influences, noting that the album established her as a notable R&B talent.

More critical reviews focused on the album's execution. Writing for The Village Voice, Amy Linden praised Michele's "tangy, jazzy voice" and "effortless womanly grace," but felt the album was often "pleasant" yet "sluggish" due to its overly earnest songwriting and lack of energy. Steven J. Horowitz of PopMatters likewise praised Michele's jazz-influenced vocals but criticized the conventional R&B production, arguing that I Am ultimately fell short of her artistic potential and was "a disappointing achievement rather than a remarkable debut." Jon Caramanica of The New York Times argued that I Am leaned too heavily on retro influences, writing that "unlike Winehouse, who was repurposing and updating, Ms. Michele was rehashing."

== Commercial performance ==
I Am debuted at number twenty-nine on the US Billboard 200 and number five on the Top R&B/Hip-Hop Albums chart, selling 26,000 copies in its first week. By late February 2009, the album had sold 419,000 units domestically.

== Track listing ==
I Am – Standard edition
No.	Title	Writer(s)	Length
1.	"Like a Dream"	Chrisette Payne; Christopher Grant; Dwayne "Whateva" Lindsey	3:59
2.	"Work It Out"	Payne; Grant; Lindsey	4:21
3.	"If I Have My Way"	Payne; Kevin Randolph; David Lee Stewart	4:02
4.	"Best of Me"	Payne; Kenneth "Babyface" Edmonds	3:53
5.	"Your Joy"	Payne; Edmonds; Rob Lewis	4:32
6.	"Good Girl"	Payne; Salaam Remi	4:04
7.	"Be OK" (featuring will.i.am)	Payne; William Adams, Jr.; Bob Marley	3:43
8.	"Mr. Radio"	Payne; Grant; Lindsey	3:54
9.	"Golden"	Payne; Joseph Smart	4:23
10.	"Let's Rock"	Payne; Adams; Darryl McDaniels; Joseph Simmons	4:44
11.	"Love Is You"	Payne; John Stephens	3:17
12.	"In This for You"	Payne; Remi	3:41
13.	"Is This the Way Love Feels"	Payne; Kelvin Wooten	6:46
14.	"I Am One" (hidden track)	Payne; Wooten	3:45

I Am – Japanese edition (bonus tracks)
No.	Title	Length
15.	"Good Girl" (Def Jam First Look Live)	4:14
16.	"If I Have My Way" (Def Jam First Look Live)	4:05

I Am – iTunes edition (bonus tracks)
No.	Title	Length
17.	"Golden" (Def Jam First Look Live)	4:28

Sample credits

- "Good Girl" contains a sample from "Move Over" performed by The Soul Children.
- "Be OK" contains a sample from "Could You Be Loved" performed by Bob Marley & the Wailers.
- "Let's Rock" contains a sample from "Here We Go" performed by Run D.M.C.

== Personnel ==
=== Musicians ===
- Chrisette Michele – singing, backing vocals
- Face – acoustic guitar, drums
- Lino Gomez – bass clarinet
- Vincent Henry – baritone saxophone
- Chris Johnson (drummer) – drums
- Norris "Sirone" Jones – guitar
- Lisa Kim – violin
- Gail Kruvand – bass
- John Legend – piano
- Rob Lewis – keyboards
- Emily Mitchell – bass clarinet
- Eileen Moon – cello
- Sandra Park – violin
- Bruce Purse – bass trumpet
- Salaam Remi – bass, drums, guitar, piano
- Robert Smith III – drums
- Qiang Tu – cello
- Jeremy Turner – cello
- Omari Williams – drums
- Steve Williamson – clarinet
- Kelvin Wooten – bass, organ, piano
- Sharon Yamada – violin

=== Production ===
- Chrisette Michele – producer
- Babyface – producer, keyboard programming
- Stephen Barber – string arrangements
- Paul Boutin – engineer
- Thom Cadley – engineer
- Lysa Cooper – stylist
- Dwayne "Whateva" Lindsey – producer
- Andrew Dawson – engineer
- Nichell Delvaille – art coordinator, photo coordination
- Gleyder "Gee" Disla – assistant
- Dylan Dresdow – mixing engineer
- Doug "Biggs" Ellison – programming, executive producer, management, vocal editing
- Anthony Gallo – vocal engineer
- Jon Gass – mixing
- GI Joe – producer
- Don Goodrick – assistant engineer
- Christopher "Jazz" Grant – engineer
- Bernie Grundman – mastering
- Courtney Harris – assistant engineer
- Matt Jones – photography
- Doug Joswick – package production
- Hyomin Kang – assistant engineer
- John Legend – producer
- Rob Lewis – string arrangements
- Riley Mackin – engineer
- Manny Marroquin – mixing
- Tony Maserati – mixing
- Mo Jaz – producer
- Linette Payne – personal manager
- Kevin Randolph – producer
- L.A. Reid – executive producer
- Kendal "KD" Revanales – programming, engineer, vocal editing
- Rubin Rivera – engineer
- Mark Roule – digital editing, mixing assistant
- Joseph Smart – engineer
- Jason Stasium – engineer
- David Lee Stewart – producer
- Matt Taylor – design
- Nadia Vessel – hair stylist
- will.i.am – producer
- Kelvin Wooten – producer, string arrangements
- Patricia Yankee – grooming

== Charts ==
=== Weekly charts ===
Weekly chart performance for I Am
Chart (2007)	Peak position
Japanese Albums (Oricon)	186
US Billboard 200	29
US Top R&B/Hip-Hop Albums (Billboard)	5

=== Year-end charts ===
2007 year-end chart performance for I Am
Chart (2007)	Position
US Top R&B/Hip-Hop Albums (Billboard)	58

2008 year-end chart performance for I Am
Chart (2008)	Position
US Top R&B/Hip-Hop Albums (Billboard)	44

== Release history ==
I Am release history
Country	Date	Format	Label	Catalog	Ref.
United Kingdom	June 18, 2007	CD; digital download	Island	14466	
United States	June 19, 2007	CD; digital download	Def Jam	B000877402	
Canada	July 10, 2007	CD; digital download	Def Jam	B000877402	
Germany	July 24, 2007	CD; digital download	Universal Music	–	
Japan	November 21, 2007	CD; digital download	Universal Japan	91147	
