= Let Freedom Reign =

Studio album by Chrisette Michele
- Released: November 30, 2010
- Recorded: 2009–2010
- Genre: R&B
- Length: 44:51
- Label: Def Jam
- Producer: Chuck Harmony

Chrisette Michele chronology
Epiphany (2009)	Let Freedom Reign (2010)	Better (2013)

Singles from Let Freedom Reign
- 1. "I'm a Star" Released: September 28, 2010; 2. "Goodbye Game" Released: November 16, 2010; 3. "I Don't Know Why, But I Do" Released: November 22, 2010

Let Freedom Reign is the third studio album by American R&B singer Chrisette Michele, released November 30, 2010 on Def Jam Recordings. Production for the album took place at several recording studios and was handled entirely by record producer Chuck Harmony, who also co-wrote most of the album with Michele.

The album debuted at number 25 on the US Billboard 200 chart, selling 42,000 copies in its first week. Upon its release, Let Freedom Reign received positive reviews from most music critics, who complimented its production and Michele's singing.

== Background ==
Recording sessions for the album took place at various recording locations, including KMA Studios and The Cutting Room in New York, New York, Vanilla Sky Studios in North Hollywood, California, and Westlake Recording Studios in Los Angeles, California. The album was produced entirely by Chuck Harmony.

== Reception ==
=== Commercial performance ===
The album debuted at number 25 on the US Billboard 200 chart, with first-week sales of 42,000 copies in the United States. It also entered at seven on Billboard's R&B/Hip-Hop Albums and at number 12 on its Digital Albums chart.

=== Critical response ===
Professional ratings
Review scores
Source	Rating
AllMusic	4/5 stars
Entertainment Weekly	(B+)
New York Daily News	3/5 stars
The New York Times	(favorable)
The Philadelphia Inquirer	3/4 stars
USA Today	3/4 stars

Let Freedom Reign received positive reviews from most music critics. Allmusic writer Andy Kellman gave it four out of five stars and complimented its "upbeat disposition", calling it "the most energetic of Chrisette’s three albums". Entertainment Weekly's Simon Vozick-Levinson noted Michele's "assured performances" and commended her "timelessly sleek voice" and the album's "crisp, understated backdrops". Elysa Gardner of USA Today gave the album three out of four stars and complimented her "tangy singing, a distinctly feminine mix of silvery sensuality and catch-in-the-throat yearning".

Despite writing favorably of its arrangements and Michele's vocals, New York Daily News writer Jim Farber found the album's subject matter clichéd and wrote that it "seems torn between mainstream R&B and something more profound". The Philadelphia Inquirer's A.D. Amorosi viewed that it "is not as focused as her previous albums", but complimented Michele's "elegant voice" and commented that "little in her catalog stands out as gorgeously as the ferocious ballad 'Goodbye Game'". Nate Chinen of The New York Times responded negatively to Michele's rapping on the album's title track, calling her verses "artless and stiff". However, Chinen commented more favorably of its other songs and wrote that "Michele is at her best redressing infringements more personal than political in nature".

== Track listing ==
- All tracks were produced by Chuck Harmony.

No.	Title	Writer(s)	Length
1.	"Fairy Tales and Castles (Part 1)"	Chrisette Payne; Charles Harmon	0:34
2.	"I’m a Star"	Shaffer Smith; Harmon	4:13
3.	"Number One"	C. Payne; Linette Payne; Harmon	3:37
4.	"Fairy Tales and Castles (Part 2)"	C. Payne; Harmon	0:28
5.	"I Don’t Know Why, But I Do"	John Stephens; Jazmine Sullivan	3:59
6.	"Let Freedom Reign" (feat. Talib Kweli & Black Thought)	C. Payne; Harmon; Talib Greene; Tariq Trotter	4:21
7.	"Goodbye Game"	C. Payne; Harmon	3:57
8.	"So Cool"	Smith; Harmon	4:00
9.	"So in Love" (feat. Rick Ross)	Kandi Buruss	4:12
10.	"So in Love (Skit)"		0:11
11.	"I'm Your Life"	C. Payne; Harmon	3:14
12.	"I'm from NY (Skit)"		0:17
13.	"Unsaid"	C. Payne; Harmon	4:23
14.	"If Nobody Sang Along"	C. Payne; Harmon	3:45
15.	"I Know Nothing"	C. Payne; Harmon	3:40

iTunes bonus tracks
No.	Title	Writer(s)	Length
16.	"Boys Cry Too"	C. Payne; Harmon	3:42
17.	"Boys Cry Too" (MMTS Edit)	C. Payne; Harmon	3:26

Deluxe edition bonus tracks
No.	Title	Length
18.	"What's the Matter"	3:28
19.	"I Want You"	3:40

== Personnel ==
Credits for Let Freedom Reign adapted from Allmusic.

- Alejandro Barajas – assistant
- Jesse Bond – bass, guitar
- Jesse Bonds – guitar
- Leesa D. Brunson – A&R
- Chrisette Michele – executive producer, liner notes
- Stephen Ferrera – A&R
- Moses Gallart – assistant
- Tom Gardner – assistant
- Trevor Gates – assistant
- Chuck Harmony – engineer, executive producer, instrumentation, organ, producer
- Mike "TrakGuru" Johnson – engineer, production coordination
- Doug Joswick – package production
- Lance Tolbert – bass
- John Legend – piano
- Giovanna Morga – cello
- Stanley Phillip – assistant
- Herb Powers Jr. – mastering
- Antonio "L.A." Reid – executive producer
- Jazmine Sullivan – background vocals
- Mark Tavern – A&R
- Dapo Torimiro – bass
- Miranda Penn Turin – photography
- Kristen Yiengst – artwork, photo coordination
- Andy Zulla – mixing

== Charts ==
=== Weekly charts ===
Chart (2010)	Peak position
US Billboard 200	25
US Top R&B/Hip-Hop Albums (Billboard)	7

=== Year-end charts ===
Chart (2011)	Position
US Top R&B/Hip-Hop Albums	56
