= Milestone (Chrisette Michele album) =

Studio album by Chrisette Michele
- Released: June 10, 2016
- Recorded: 2014–16
- Genre: R&B; hip hop soul; soul
- Length: 44:11 (standard); 67:22 (deluxe)
- Label: Caroline; Rich Hipster

Chrisette Michele chronology
Better (2013)	Milestone (2016)	Out of Control (2018)

Singles from Milestone
- 1. "Steady" Released: December 4, 2015; 2. "Unbreakable" Released: March 4, 2016; 3. "Equal" Released: June 3, 2016

Milestone is the fifth studio album by American R&B recording artist Chrisette Michele. It was released on June 10, 2016, by Caroline Records and Rich Hipster. It was supported by the singles: "Steady", "Unbreakable" and "Equal". It peaked at number seventy-three on US Billboard 200, selling 8,000 copies in its first week.

== Commercial performance ==
Milestone peaked at number seventy-three on US Billboard 200 while reaching the top five on Top R&B/Hip-Hop Albums, peaking at number five.

== Critical reception ==
Professional ratings
Review scores
Source	Rating
AllMusic	2/5 stars

Joe Nelson from Singersroom stated that the album shows eclectic growth.

== Track listing ==
Milestone – Standard edition
No.	Title	Writer(s)	Producer(s)	Length
1.	"Diamond Letter"	Chrisette Payne; Derwin Armstrong; Doug Ellison	Blickie Blaze	3:38
2.	"Steady"	Payne; Turrell Sims; Armstrong; Ellison	Blickie Blaze	4:10
3.	"Meant to Be" (featuring Meet Sims)	Payne; Sims; Anthony Norris; Kyle Abacan; Khaled Khaled	Lee on the Beats; Roc da Producer; Austin Powerz	3:46
4.	"Soulmate"	Payne; Timothy Stokes; Armstrong; Ellison	Young Stokes; Blickie Blaze	4:10
5.	"Unbreakable"	Payne; Armstrong; Ellison	Blickie Blaze	2:50
6.	"To the Moon"	Payne; Norris	Lee on the Beats	4:11
7.	"Make Me Fall"	Payne; Stokes; Armstrong; Ellison	Young Stokes; Blickie Blaze	3:05
8.	"Equal" (featuring Rick Ross)	Payne; Stokes; Armstrong; Ellison; William Leonard Roberts II	Young Stokes; Blickie Blaze	2:58
9.	"These Stones"	Payne; Stokes; Ellison	Young Stokes	4:27
10.	"Indie Girl"	Payne; Armstrong; Ellison	Blickie Blaze	3:46
11.	"Us Against the World"	Payne; Lem Payne; Armstrong; Ellison	Blickie Blaze	3:35
12.	"Reinvent the Wheel" (featuring Mali Music)	Payne; Armstrong; Ellison; Antario Holmes; Kortney Jamaal Pollard	Blickie Blaze; Antario Holmes	3:42
Total length:				44:11

Milestone – Deluxe edition
No.	Title	Writer(s)	Producer(s)	Length
13.	"My Body"	Payne; Stokes; Ellison	Young Stokes; Blickie Blaze	3:29
14.	"Private Destination"	Payne; Armstrong; Ellison	Blickie Blaze	3:06
15.	"Black Girl Magic"	Payne; Armstrong; Ellison	Blickie Blaze	3:17
16.	"Edge of the Bar"	Payne; Armstrong; Ellison	Blickie Blaze	3:16
17.	"Top of the World"	Payne	Blickie Blaze	3:59
18.	"Zero" (featuring Lem Payne)	Payne; Payne; Armstrong; Ellison	Blickie Blaze	3:13
19.	"Ebony"	Payne; Stokes; Armstrong; Ellison	Young Stokes; Blickie Blaze	2:56
Total length:				67:22

== Charts ==
=== Weekly charts ===
Chart (2016)	Peak position
US Billboard 200	73
US Top R&B/Hip-Hop Albums (Billboard)	5

=== Year-end charts ===
Chart (2016)	Position
US Top R&B/Hip-Hop Albums (Billboard)	98
