= Epiphany (Chrisette Michele album) =

Studio album by Chrisette Michele
- Released: May 5, 2009
- Recorded: 2008–2009
- Genre: R&B
- Length: 46:03
- Label: Def Jam
- Producer: Ne-Yo; Chuck Harmony; Allstar; Darkchild; Bei Maejor

Chrisette Michele chronology
I Am (2007)	Epiphany (2009)	Let Freedom Reign (2010)

Singles from Epiphany
- 1. "Epiphany" Released: January 27, 2009; 2. "Blame It on Me" Released: May 12, 2009; 3. "What You Do" Released: July 7, 2009; 4. "Fragile" Released: November 12, 2009

Epiphany is the second studio album by American R&B and soul singer–songwriter Chrisette Michele, released May 5, 2009 on Def Jam Recordings in the United States. Recording sessions for the album took place during 2008 to 2009. In January 2009, the title track "Epiphany" was released as its lead single.

Epiphany debuted at number one on the US Billboard 200 chart, while selling 83,000 copies in its first week. Upon its release, the album received generally positive reviews from music critics, based on an aggregate score of 71/100 from Metacritic.

== Background ==
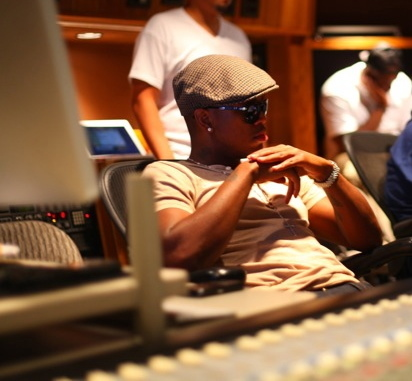
R&B recording artist Ne-Yo co-wrote and co-produced several songs.

Chrisette Michele told Billboard's Mariel Concepcion that her new album would be "more upbeat and youthful". Production for the album was handled by Chuck Harmony, Claude Kelly, Bei Maejor, and Ne-Yo.

Michele says one of her favorite tracks is the piano-based "Blame It on Me", in which she croons, "Blame it on me/Say it's my fault/Say I left you out in the cold with a broken heart/I really don't care/I'm not crying no more/Say I'm a liar, a cheater, say anything that you want/As long as it's over." "On My Own", Michele says, reminds her of her father. "I'm very close to my dad, but recently I've learned how to handle situations on my own, without having him step in for me, and it took a lot of me to be able to do that", she admits.

== Critical reception ==
Critical response to the album was generally positive. AllMusic's Andy Kellman wrote that "the material, while mostly well-crafted, runs together as a block of slow, serious songs broken up by only a couple brief upswings in energy" and how "Chrisette, naturally, sounds outstanding throughout, as a supernaturally talented vocalist whose songs are nonetheless easily relatable to anyone going through a breakup—or, to a significantly lesser extent here, newfound love." He also felt that the album "could have really used more rhythmic punch than a token throwback strutter." Maiya Norton of Vibe commented on how her album gained some edge, expressing some anger and heartbreak.

Despite noting its production as a weakness, Miami Herald writer Adrian Ruhi gave the album 3 out of 4 stars and commended Michele for her vocals. In a positive review, The Koalition said that "it would seem almost impossible for Chrisette Michele to avoid the "sophomore slump", but she finds a way by simply catering to an age old rule: just create great pieces of music." In some reviews her voice has been compared to the likes of Ella Fitzgerald. Giving the album four out of five stars, Timothy Michael Carson of About.com favored her unique, distinctive strong vocals, her cohesiveness, and the song "Blame It on Me", but was disappointed in the fact it had less of a jazz influence than her debut album I Am.

Professional ratings
Review scores
Source	Rating
About.com	4/5 stars
AllMusic	3.5/5 stars
Christgau's Consumer Guide	(1-star Honorable Mention)
Entertainment Weekly	(C)
Los Angeles Times	3.5/4 stars
The New York Times	(mixed)
PopMatters	(8/10)
Rolling Stone	3/5 stars
Slant	3/5 stars
Vibe	(favorable)

== Commercial performance ==
Epiphany debuted at number one on the Billboard 200 with first-week sales of 83,000 units, giving Michele her first number 1 album on the chart.

== Track listing ==
No.	Title	Writer(s)	Producer(s)	Length
1.	"Epiphany (I'm Leaving)"	Shaffer Smith; Charles Harmon	Chuck Harmony	3:25
2.	"Notebook"	Claude Kelly; Harmon	Harmony	3:46
3.	"What You Do" (featuring Ne-Yo)	Smith; Harmon	Harmony	3:22
4.	"Blame It on Me"	Chrisette Payne; Kelly; Harmon		4:09
5.	"All I Ever Think About"	Allen "Allstar" Gordon, Jr.; Jayms Madison; Joel Campbell; Teron Beal	Allstar	3:41
6.	"Playin' Our Song"	Kelly; Rodney Jerkins	Darkchild	3:33
7.	"Another One"	Kelly; Harmon	Harmony	3:39
8.	"On My Own"	Smith; Brandon Green; Timothy Bos Bullock	Bei Maejor	3:46
9.	"Fragile"	Payne; Kelly; Harmon	Harmony	4:15
10.	"Mr. Right"	Payne; Kelly; Harmon	Harmony	4:23
11.	"Porcelain Doll"	Smith; Harmon	Harmony	3:45
12.	"I'm Okay"	Smith; Harmon	Harmony	4:18
Total length:				46:03

== Personnel ==
=== Musicians ===
- Chrisette Michele – vocals; backing vocals (track 5)
- Jesse Bond – guitar (tracks 4, 9, 12)
- Chuck Harmony – drums (tracks 4, 12); guitar (track 2)
- Claude Kelly – backing vocals (tracks 2, 4, 6, 9, 10)
- J. Michel – backing vocals (track 5)
- Calvin Palmer – bass (track 4)
- Brent Paschke – guitar (track 6)

=== Production ===
- Allstar – producer, engineer (track 5)
- June Ambrose – stylist
- Keith Campbell – hair stylist
- Carol Corless – package production
- Darkchild – producer (track 6)
- Kevin "KD" Davis – mixing (tracks 1, 3, 5, 7, 8, 10, 11)
- Mildred Delamota – art direction
- Mike "Handz" Donaldson – engineer (track 6)
- Bojan Dugich – engineer (track 10)
- Doug "Biggs" Ellison – executive producer
- Moses Gallart – assistant engineer (tracks 1, 3, 11)
- Anthony "Rocky" Gallo – engineer (track 10); vocal tracking
- Tom Gardner – assistant engineer
- Eshy Gazit – vocal tracking
- Serban Ghenea – mixing
- John Hanes – mixing
- Chuck Harmony – producer (tracks 1–4, 7, 9–12)
- Mike "Track Guru" Johnson – assistant engineer (tracks 2, 4, 7–9, 12)
- Doug Joswick – package production
- Claude Kelly – vocal producer
- Bei Maejor – producer (track 8)
- Tim Bullock - producer (track 8)
- Ne-Yo – co-producer (tracks 1, 3, 7, 8); executive producer
- Herb Powers Jr. – mastering
- Geno Regist – engineer (tracks 1–4, 7–9, 11, 12)
- Jeff Riedel – photography
- Tim Roberts – assistant
- Noah Tafua – mixing assistant
- Kris Yiengst – art coordinator, photo coordination

== Charts ==
=== Weekly charts ===
Chart (2009)	Peak position
US Billboard 200	1
US Top R&B/Hip-Hop Albums (Billboard)	1

=== Year-end charts ===
Chart (2009)	Position
US Billboard 200	96
US Top R&B/Hip-Hop Albums	19
