= Chrisette Michele =

American singer (born 1982)

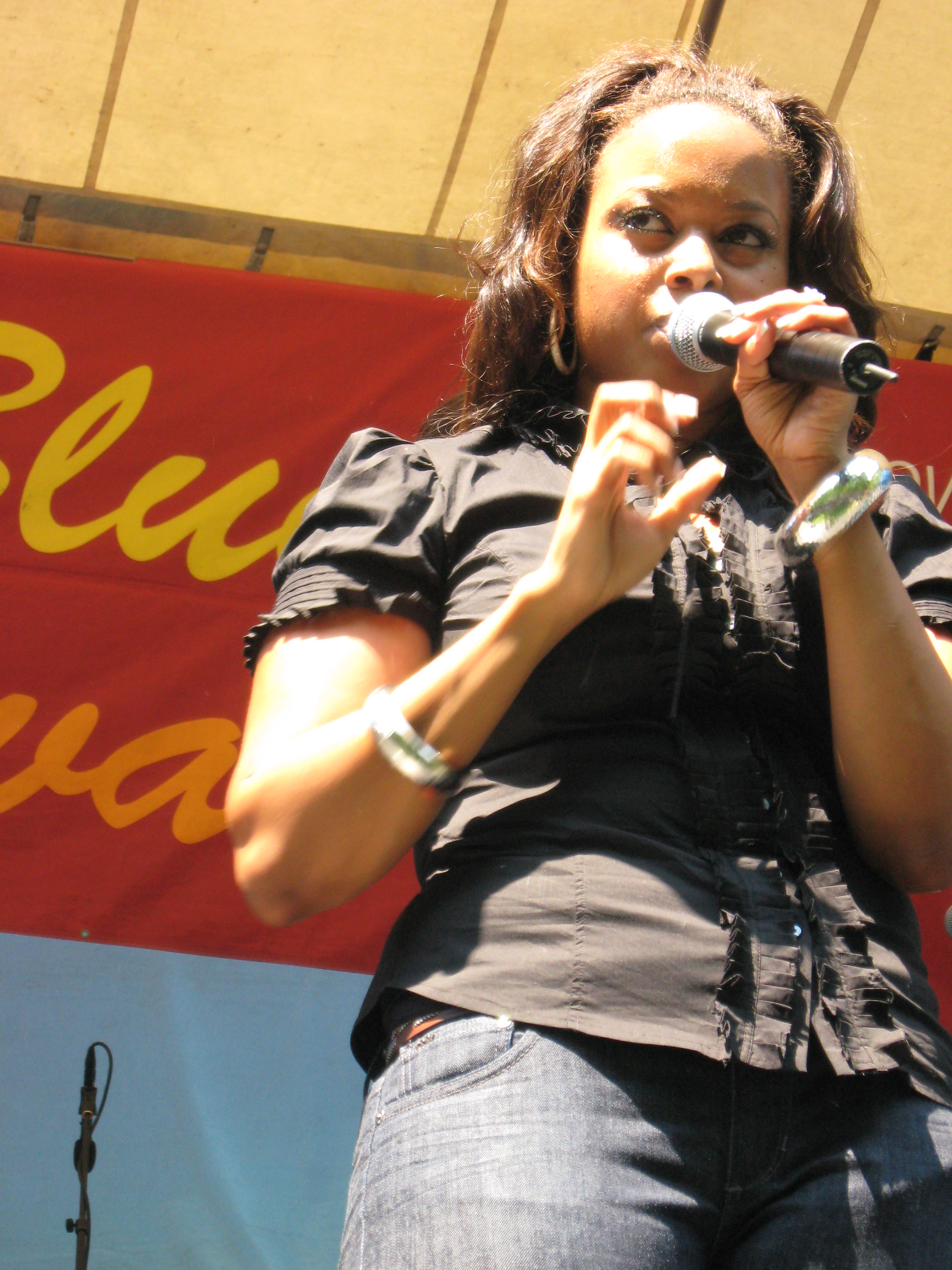
- Michele in 2007

Background information
- Born: Chrisette Michele Payne; December 8, 1982 (age 43); Central Islip, New York, U.S.
- Origin: Patchogue, New York, U.S.
- Genres: R&B; hip hop; soul; jazz
- Occupations: Singer; songwriter
- Years active: 2006–present
- Labels: Def Jam; Motown; Rich Hipster
- Website: chrisettemichelesworld.com

Chrisette Michele Payne (born December 8, 1982) is an American R&B and soul singer. She won a Grammy Award for Best Urban/Alternative Performance in 2009 for her song "Be OK" (featuring will.i.am).

She was previously signed to Motown Records, Capitol Records, and Caroline Distribution but was dropped from her label in 2017 after performing at Donald Trump's presidential inauguration. In the same year, Michele announced plans to release new music independently through her own label, Rich Hipster.

== Early life ==
Michele was born in Central Islip, New York, and grew up in Patchogue. Her father was a sociologist and her mother a psychologist. Michele led gospel choirs in high school. She attended Five Towns College in Dix Hills, New York, and graduated with a vocal performance degree.

She is the first cousin of soul singer Raheem DeVaughn.

== Music career ==
=== 2006–2008: Musical beginnings and I Am ===
Michele has been featured on several hip hop albums, such as The Game's LAX, on the song "Let Us Live". On Jay-Z's Kingdom Come, she appears on the second single, "Lost One", while on Nas' Hip Hop Is Dead, she is featured three times: on the album's second single "Can't Forget About You", the Kanye West-produced "Still Dreaming", and the final track, "Hope". She also appeared on the bonus track "Slow Down" from Ghostface Killah's The Big Doe Rehab.

Michele's debut album, I Am, was released on June 18, 2007. The song "Your Joy" was released on iTunes as a free single of the week. The album spawned four singles: "If I Have My Way", "Best of Me", "Be OK", and "Love Is You". The album's lead single, "If I Have My Way", charted at number 24 on the US Hot R&B/Hip-Hop Songs chart. "Best of Me" charted on the US Hot Adult Contemporary Tracks at number 21. In December 2007, "Be OK" was released as the third single, charting at number 64 on the US Hot R&B/Hip-Hop Songs chart. In 2008, "Love Is You" was released as the album's fourth and final single; it reached number 90 on the US Hot R&B/Hip-Hop Songs chart.

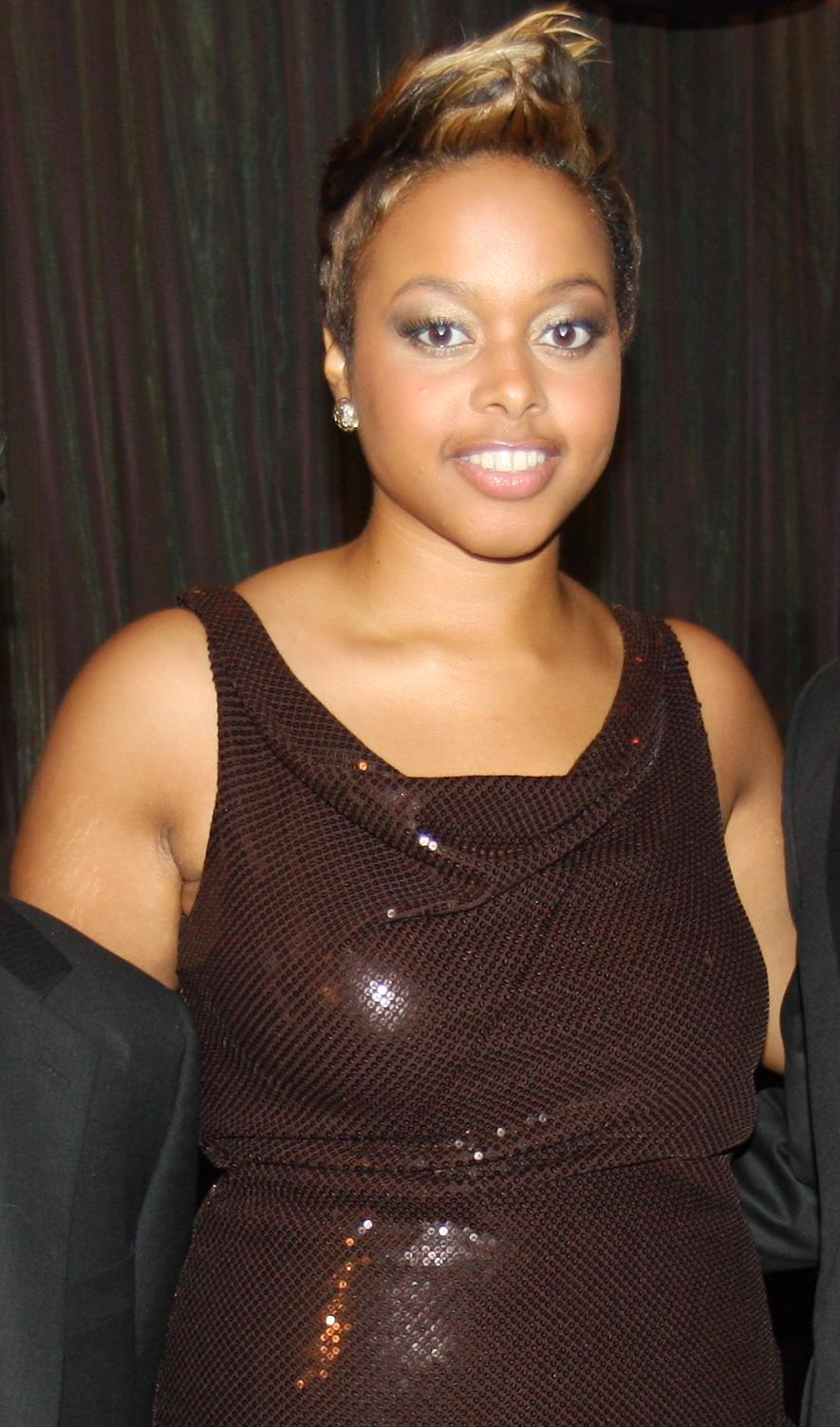
Michele in 2008

In 2008, Michele appeared on the track "Rising Up" from the Roots' album Rising Down. Michele guest starred as herself in The CW's Girlfriends, in the episode entitled "What's Black-a-Lackin'?", which originally aired on February 11, 2008. She also wrote a song for Tyler Perry's House of Payne, titled "I've Gotta Love Jones". From May to July 2008, Michele embarked on a nationwide co-headlining tour with fellow soul singer Raheem DeVaughn called the Art of Love Tour; Solange Knowles served as the opening act. In September 2008, Michele performed twice at the Evening of Stars: A Tribute to Patti LaBelle.

=== 2009–2012: Epiphany, Let Freedom Reign, and mixtape releases ===
In mid-2008, Michele began recording her second album, Epiphany. In January 2009, the album's title track was released as the lead single. It marked Michele's first solo entry to the Billboard Hot 100, where it peaked at number 89. Released on May 5, 2009, the album debuted at number 1 on the Billboard 200, selling 83,000 copies in its opening week. A week after the release of Epiphany, another single was released, titled "Blame It on Me". It didn't repeat the success of "Epiphany (I'm Leaving)"; however, it peaked at number 28 on the US Hot R&B/Hip-Hop Songs chart. It was followed by two more: "What You Do" in July and "Fragile" in November. Originally, "What You Do" was planned to be the second single from the album. The song features Ne-Yo, who worked with Michele on the album. After the release of Epiphany, she started working on her next album. Michele has worked with rapper Rick Ross and Canadian rapper/singer Drake on the fourth single of Ross's album Teflon Don, called "Aston Martin Music". The song was released on October 5, 2010. Michele released her third studio album, Let Freedom Reign, on November 30, 2010. The record included the singles "I'm a Star" and "Goodbye Game". "I'm a Star" was released in September, and was followed by "Goodbye Game" and "I Don't Know Why, But I Do", both in November, just before the release of the album. The record features Michele performing hip-hop, R&B, as well as the dance-pop influenced "So Cool". The album debuted at number 25 on the US Billboard 200 chart, selling 42,000 copies in its first week. It also peaked at number 7 on the US Top R&B/Hip-Hop Albums chart. On November 5, 2010, her first mixtape, Love Thy Brother, was released. On December 7, 2012, her second mixtape, titled Audrey Hepburn: An Audiovisual Presentation, followed. The mixtape contained some songs recorded for her fourth studio album, such as the single "Charades", among other tracks.

=== 2013–present: Better, R&B Divas LA, The Lyricist's Opus, and Milestone ===
The first single from Michele's fourth album, Better, titled "Charades", was released on January 29, 2013. Previously, "Charades" was featured on her second mixtape album, released in late 2012. The second single, "A Couple of Forevers", was released in February. The Alcon came out on June 11, 2013, published by Motown Records. It was produced by Michele, Shea Taylor, and Pop & Oak. Michele collaborated with rappers such as 2 Chainz and Wale on the album. It debuted at number 12 on the U.S. Billboard 200 chart, selling 27,000 copies in its first week. It was nominated at the 2014 Grammy Awards for Best R&B Album. Chrisette Michelle joined the cast of R&B Divas LA for its second season. On March 20, 2015, it was reported that she left the show. On November 24, 2014, Michele released her latest project, entitled The Lyricist's Opus, for digital download. Two music videos were released from the EP: "Super Chris" on October 1, and "Together" on December 15.

On November 12, 2016, Michele released her single "Steady". It was produced by Blickie Blaze, also from Four Kings Productions. "Steady" is the lead single from her fifth studio album, Milestone tour, which was released on June 10, 2016, via her label Rich Hipster.

In 2018, she released the album Out of Control.

In 2020, Michele released the single "Wait".

== Controversy ==
In January 2017, media outlets reported that Michele would perform at the inauguration of Donald Trump. This was met with backlash on social media, prompting Michele to respond via an open letter on Twitter, stating that she had intended her performance to serve as a bridge between Trump supporters and opponents. Author Aliya S. King published a response to the singer's letter on BET, expressing disappointment with Michele's choice to perform and felt like her letter was a "cop-out". Michele was initially supposed to perform at the Make America Great Again! Welcome Celebration held the day prior to the inauguration, but did not perform and instead played at one of the inaugural balls the following day. In response to her performing, Spike Lee removed Michele's song "Black Girl Magic" from his upcoming Netflix series She's Gotta Have It. Subsequent to the performance, Michele announced the release of her poetry album No Political Genius.

== Personal life ==
Michele was inducted as an honorary member of Zeta Phi Beta sorority on September 19, 2023. In 2025, Michele disclosed that she had recently been diagnosed with autism.

== Discography ==
- I Am (2007)
- Epiphany (2009)
- Let Freedom Reign (2010)
- Better (2013)
- Milestone (2016)

== Tours ==
Headlining

- The Art of Love Tour (with Raheem DeVaughn) (2008)
- The Epiphany Tour (2010)
- The Milestone Tour (2016)
- Moody Tour (2021)

Supporting act

- Woman to Woman Tour for Keyshia Cole (2013)
- Liberation Tour for Mary J. Blige (2013)
- Appreciation Tour for Jaheim (2013)

== Awards and nominations ==
Year	Award	Category	Result
2008	Vibe Music Award	Breakthrough Artist of the Year	Nominated
2008	Grammy Award	Best Female R&B Vocal Performance ("If I Have My Way")	Nominated
2008	BET Award	Best New Artist	Nominated
2008	Centric Music Award	Virtual Awards: Soul Approved	Won
2008	Centric Music Award	Female Artist of the Year	Nominated
2008	NAACP Image Awards	Outstanding New Artist	Nominated
2009	Grammy Award	Best Urban/Alternative Performance ("Be OK")	Won
2009	Soul Train Awards	Best R&B/Soul Female Artist	Nominated
2009	Urban Music Awards	Best Female Act	Nominated
2010	Centric Award	Centric Award	Nominated
2013	Soul Train Award	Best R&B/Soul Female Artist	Nominated
2014	Grammy Award	Best R&B Album (Better)	Nominated
