= 50 Cent singles discography =

50 Cent discography
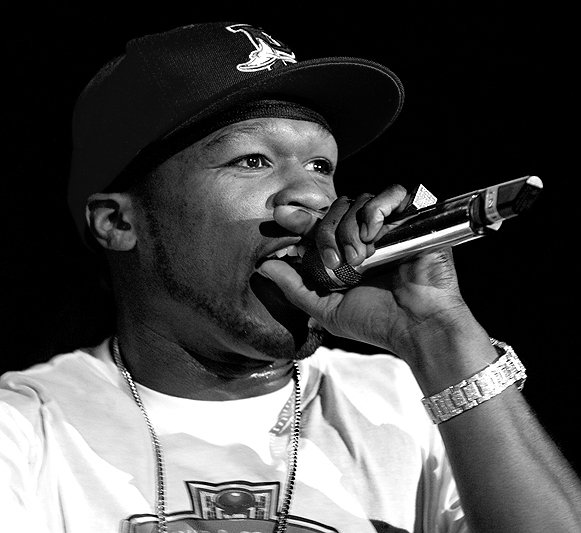
- 50 Cent in 2007
- Singles: 91
- Music videos: 88

This is the songs discography for American rapper 50 Cent.

== Singles ==
=== As lead artist ===
List of singles as lead artist, with selected chart positions and certifications, showing year released and album name
Title	Year	Peak chart positions										Certifications	Album
Title	Year	US	AUS	BEL (FL)	CAN	GER	IRL	NZ	SWE	SWI	UK	Certifications	Album
"How to Rob" (featuring The Madd Rapper)	1999	—	—	—	—	—	—	—	—	—	—		In Too Deep: Music from the Dimension Picture Soundtrack / Tell 'Em Why U Madd / Power of the Dollar
"Rowdy Rowdy"	1999	—	—	—	—	—	—	—	—	—	—		In Too Deep: Music from the Dimension Picture Soundtrack
"Thug Love" (featuring Destiny's Child)	1999	—	—	—	—	—	—	—	—	—	—		Power of the Dollar
"Your Life's on the Line"	1999	—	—	—	—	—	—	—	—	—	—		Power of the Dollar
"Wanksta"	2002	13	—	—	—	—	—	—	—	—	—	RIAA: Platinum; BPI: Silver; RMNZ: Gold	8 Mile (soundtrack)
"Rotten Apple"	2002	—	—	—	—	—	—	—	—	—	—		Guess Who's Back?
"In da Club"	2003	1	1	2	1	1	1	1	4	1	3	RIAA: Diamond; ARIA: 10× Platinum; BEA: Gold; BPI: 4× Platinum; BVMI: 3× Platinum; IFPI SWE: Gold; IFPI SWI: Gold; RMNZ: 7× Platinum	Get Rich or Die Tryin'
"21 Questions" (featuring Nate Dogg)	2003	1	4	37	5	35	11	8	34	14	6	RIAA: 4× Platinum; ARIA: Platinum; BPI: 2× Platinum; BVMI: Gold; RMNZ: 5× Platinum	Get Rich or Die Tryin'
"P.I.M.P."	2003	3	2	10	18	5	4	2	8	4	5	RIAA: 3× Platinum; ARIA: Platinum; BPI: 2× Platinum; BVMI: 3× Gold; RMNZ: 4× Platinum	Get Rich or Die Tryin'
"If I Can't"	2003	76	22	24	—	34	11	26	—	15	10	RIAA: Gold; BPI: Gold; BVMI: Gold; RMNZ: 2× Platinum	Get Rich or Die Tryin'
"Disco Inferno"	2004	3	—	—	—	—	—	—	—	—	87	RIAA: 2× Platinum; BPI: Silver; RMNZ: Platinum	The Massacre
"Candy Shop" (featuring Olivia)	2005	1	3	1	7	1	2	2	18	1	4	RIAA: 5× Platinum; ARIA: Platinum; BPI: Platinum; BVMI: 5× Gold; RMNZ: 4× Platinum	The Massacre
"Just a Lil Bit"	2005	3	13	9	— (Note: "Just a Lil Bit" did not enter the Canadian Singles Chart, but peaked at number six on the Radio & Records Canada CHR/Pop Top 30 chart.)	11	9	8	—	11	10	RIAA: 3× Platinum; ARIA: Gold; BPI: Platinum; BVMI: Platinum; RMNZ: 4× Platinum	The Massacre
"Outta Control" (Remix) (featuring Mobb Deep)	2005	6	16	10	6	8	5	12	—	10	7	RIAA: Platinum; BPI: Gold; RMNZ: 2× Platinum	The Massacre
"Hustler's Ambition"	2005	65	23	39	—	22	11	17	—	10	13	RIAA: Gold; BPI: Gold; RMNZ: Platinum	Get Rich or Die Tryin': Music from and Inspired by the Motion Picture Soundtrack
"Window Shopper"	2005	20	13	19	—	20	6	8	—	7	11	RIAA: Platinum; BPI: Platinum; RMNZ: Platinum	Get Rich or Die Tryin': Music from and Inspired by the Motion Picture Soundtrack
"Best Friend" (featuring Olivia)	2006	35	—	—	—	—	—	—	—	—	—	RIAA: Platinum; BPI: Silver; RMNZ: 3× Platinum	Get Rich or Die Tryin': Music from and Inspired by the Motion Picture Soundtrack
"I'll Whip Ya Head Boy" (featuring Young Buck and M.O.P.)	2006	—	—	—	—	—	—	—	—	—	—	RMNZ: Gold	Get Rich or Die Tryin': Music from and Inspired by the Motion Picture Soundtrack
"You Don't Know" (with Eminem, Lloyd Banks and Cashis)	2006	12	—	— (Note: "You Don't Know" did not enter the Flanders Ultratop 50, but peaked at number seven on the Ultratip chart.)	—	—	5	—	—	—	32	RIAA: Platinum; ARIA: Gold; BPI: Gold; RMNZ: Platinum	Eminem Presents: The Re-Up
"Jimmy Crack Corn" (with Eminem)	2007	— (Note: "Jimmy Crack Corn" did not enter the Billboard Hot 100, but peaked at number one on the Bubbling Under Hot 100 Singles chart, which acts as an extension to the Hot 100.)	—	—	—	—	—	—	—	—	—		Eminem Presents: The Re-Up
"Straight to the Bank"	2007	32	—	— (Note: "Straight to the Bank" did not enter the Flanders Ultratop 50, but peaked at number 23 on the Ultratip chart.)	—	33	—	—	53	—	—	RMNZ: Platinum	Curtis
"Amusement Park"	2007	— (Note: "Amusement Park" did not enter the Billboard Hot 100, but peaked at number 21 on the Bubbling Under Hot 100 Singles chart, which acts as an extension to the Hot 100.)	—	—	—	—	—	—	—	—	—		Curtis
"I Get Money"	2007	20	—	—	63	—	—	—	—	88	—	RIAA: Platinum; BPI: Silver; RMNZ: Gold	Curtis
"Ayo Technology" (featuring Justin Timberlake and Timbaland)	2007	5	10	13	12	3	3	1	8	2	2	ARIA: 3× Platinum; BPI: Platinum; BVMI: Gold; RIAA: 2× Platinum; RMNZ: 2× Platinum	Curtis
"I'll Still Kill" (featuring Akon)	2007	95	99	— (Note: "I'll Still Kill" did not enter the Flanders Ultratop 50, but peaked at number one on the Ultratip chart.)	—	—	—	14	—	—	—	RMNZ: Gold	Curtis
"Get Up"	2008	44	73	— (Note: "Get Up" did not enter the Flanders Ultratop 50, but peaked at number four on the Ultratip chart.)	31	—	33	—	—	—	24	RIAA: Gold	Best Of
"I Get It In"	2009	53	—	—	52	—	—	—	—	—	75		Best Of
"OK, You're Right"	2009	— (Note: "OK, You're Right" did not enter the Hot R&B/Hip-Hop Songs chart, but peaked at number 20 on the Bubbling Under R&B/Hip-Hop Singles chart, which acts as an extension to the Hot R&B/Hip-Hop Songs chart.)	—	—	—	—	—	—	—	—	—		Before I Self Destruct
"Baby by Me" (featuring Ne-Yo)	2009	28	24	— (Note: "Baby by Me" did not enter the Flanders Ultratop 50, but peaked at number four on the Ultratip chart.)	53	26	27	—	—	43	17	RIAA: Gold; BPI: Gold; RMNZ: 2× Platinum	Before I Self Destruct
"Do You Think About Me"	2010	— (Note: "Do You Think About Me" did not enter the Billboard Hot 100, but peaked at number seven on the Bubbling Under Hot 100 Singles chart, which acts as an extension to the Hot 100.)	—	—	—	—	—	—	—	—	105		Before I Self Destruct
"Outlaw"	2011	87	—	—	87	—	—	—	—	—	—		Street King Immortal (Shelved)
"Wait Until Tonight"	2011	—	—	—	—	—	—	—	—	—	—		The Big 10
"I Just Wanna" (featuring Tony Yayo)	2012	—	—	—	—	—	—	—	—	—	—		The Big 10
"New Day" (featuring Dr. Dre and Alicia Keys)	2012	79	44	—	43	53	—	—	—	—	—		Street King Immortal (Shelved)
"First Date" (featuring Too Short)	2012	—	—	—	—	—	—	—	—	—	—		Street King Immortal (Shelved)
"My Life" (featuring Eminem and Adam Levine)	2012	27	28	— (Note: "My Life" did not enter the Flanders Ultratop 50, but peaked at number two on the Ultratip chart.)	14	52	6	33	—	36	2	RIAA: Gold; ARIA: Platinum; BPI: Silver; RMNZ: Gold	Street King Immortal (Shelved)
"Major Distribution" (featuring Snoop Dogg and Young Jeezy)	2013	— (Note: "Major Distribution" did not enter the Billboard Hot 100, but peaked at number 13 on the Bubbling Under Hot 100 Singles chart, which acts as an extension to the Hot 100.)	—	—	—	—	—	—	—	—	166		Street King Immortal (Shelved)
"We Up" (featuring Kendrick Lamar)	2013	—	—	32	85	—	—	—	—	—	—		Street King Immortal (Shelved)
"Hold On"	2014	—	—	— (Note: "Hold On" did not enter the Flanders Ultratop 50, but peaked at number 92 on the Ultratip chart.)	—	—	—	—	—	—	199		Animal Ambition
"Don't Worry 'Bout It" (featuring Yo Gotti)	2014	—	—	—	—	—	—	—	—	—	165		Animal Ambition
"Pilot"	2014	— (Note: "Pilot" did not enter the Billboard Hot 100, but peaked at number 19 on the Bubbling Under Hot 100 Singles chart, which acts as an extension to the Hot 100.)	—	—	—	—	—	—	—	—	95		Animal Ambition
"Smoke" (featuring Trey Songz)	2014	—	—	—	—	—	—	—	—	—	154		Animal Ambition
"Hustler"	2014	—	—	—	—	—	—	—	—	—	—		Animal Ambition
"Chase the Paper" (featuring Prodigy, Kidd Kidd and Styles P)	2014	—	—	—	—	—	—	—	—	—	—		Animal Ambition
"Everytime I Come Around" (featuring Kidd Kidd)	2014	—	—	—	—	—	—	—	—	—	—		Animal Ambition
"Irregular Heartbeat" (featuring Jadakiss and Kidd Kidd)	2014	—	—	—	—	—	—	—	—	—	—		Animal Ambition
"Winners Circle" (featuring Guordan Banks)	2014	—	—	—	—	—	—	—	—	—	—		Animal Ambition
"Big Rich Town" (featuring Joe)	2014	—	—	—	—	—	—	—	—	—	—	BPI: Silver	Power (Soundtrack from the STARZ Original Series)
"Twisted" (featuring Mr. Probz)	2014	—	—	— (Note: "Twisted" did not enter the Flanders Ultratop 50, but peaked at number 30 on the Ultratip chart.)	—	—	—	—	—	—	—		Animal Ambition
"Animal Ambition"	2014	—	—	—	—	—	—	—	—	—	—		Animal Ambition
"Get Low" (featuring Jeremih, 2 Chainz and T.I.)	2015	—	—	—	—	—	—	—	—	—	—		Non-album singles
"9 Shots"	2015	—	—	—	—	—	—	—	—	—	—		Non-album singles
"Too Rich for the Bitch"	2015	—	—	—	—	—	—	—	—	—	—		Non-album singles
"I'm the Man" (featuring Sonny Digital or remix featuring Chris Brown)	2016	— (Note: "I'm the Man" did not enter the Billboard Hot 100, but peaked at number 10 on the Bubbling Under Hot 100 Singles chart, which acts as an extension to the Hot 100.)	—	—	—	—	—	—	—	—	—	RIAA: 2× Platinum; BPI: Silver; RMNZ: Platinum	Non-album singles
"No Romeo No Juliet" (featuring Chris Brown)	2016	—	—	—	—	—	—	—	—	—	—		Non-album singles
"Still Think I'm Nothing" (featuring Jeremih)	2017	—	—	—	—	—	—	—	—	—	—		Non-album singles
"Crazy" (featuring PnB Rock)	2018	—	—	—	—	—	—	—	—	—	—		Non-album singles
"Big Rich Town" (Power Remix) (featuring Trey Songz and A Boogie Wit da Hoodie)	2019	—	—	—	—	—	—	—	—	—	—		Non-album singles
"Part of the Game" (featuring NLE Choppa and Rileyy Lanez)	2020	—	—	—	—	—	—	— (Note: "Part of the Game" did not enter the NZ Top 40 Singles Chart, but peaked at number 10 on the NZ Hot Singles Chart.)	—	—	—		Non-album singles
"Wish Me Luck" (featuring Snoop Dogg, Moneybagg Yo and Charlie Wilson)	2021	—	—	—	—	—	—	—	—	—	—		Non-album singles
"Power Powder Respect" (featuring Jeremih and Lil Durk)	2022	—	—	—	—	—	—	—	—	—	—		Non-album singles
"Fightland" (featuring Sheff G, Sleepy Hallow and Jeremih)	2025	—	—	—	—	—	—	—	—	—	—		TBA
"No One Told Us" (featuring Leon Thomas)	2026	—	—	—	—	—	—	— (Note: "No One Told Us" did not enter the NZ Top 40 Singles Chart, but peaked at number 22 on the NZ Hot Singles Chart.)	—	—	—		TBA
"—" denotes a recording that did not chart or was not released in that territory.

=== As featured artist ===
List of singles as featured artist, with selected chart positions and certifications, showing year released and album name
Title	Year	Peak chart positions										Certifications	Album
Title	Year	US	AUS	BEL (FL)	CAN	GER	IRL	NZ	SWE	SWI	UK	Certifications	Album
"React" (Onyx featuring 50 Cent, Bonifucco, Still Livin' and X-1)	1998	—	—	—	—	—	—	—	—	—	—		Shut 'Em Down
"Magic Stick" (Lil' Kim featuring 50 Cent)	2003	2	—	—	—	—	—	47	—	—	—	RMNZ: Platinum	La Bella Mafia
"Let Me In" (Young Buck featuring 50 Cent)	2004	34	—	—	—	94	—	—	—	—	62		Straight Outta Cashville
"Encore" (Eminem featuring Dr. Dre and 50 Cent)	2004	25	—	—	—	—	—	—	—	—	116		Encore
"Westside Story" (The Game featuring 50 Cent)	2004	93	—	—	—	—	—	—	—	—	—		The Documentary
"How We Do" (The Game featuring 50 Cent)	2004	4	24	13	— (Note: "How We Do" did not enter the Canadian Singles Chart, but peaked at number 11 on the Radio & Records Canada CHR/Pop Top 30 chart.)	9	8	4	—	8	5	RIAA: Gold; BPI: Platinum; BVMI: Platinum; RMNZ: Gold	The Documentary
"Hate It or Love It" (The Game featuring 50 Cent)	2005	2	21	19	— (Note: "Hate It or Love It" did not enter the Canadian Singles Chart, but peaked at number nine on the Radio & Records Canada CHR/Pop Top 30 chart.)	14	5	3	73	12	4	RIAA: Platinum; ARIA: 3× Platinum; BPI: 3× Platinum; BVMI: Platinum; RMNZ: 6× Platinum	The Documentary
"MJB da MVP" (Mary J. Blige featuring 50 Cent)	2005	75	—	—	—	—	49	—	—	—	33		The Breakthrough
"So Seductive" (Tony Yayo featuring 50 Cent)	2005	48	—	—	—	—	22	—	—	—	28		Thoughts of a Predicate Felon
"Have a Party" (Mobb Deep featuring 50 Cent and Nate Dogg)	2005	— (Note: "Have a Party" did not enter the Billboard Hot 100, but peaked at number five on the Bubbling Under Hot 100 Singles chart, which acts as an extension to the Hot 100.)	—	—	—	—	—	—	—	—	—		Get Rich or Die Tryin' (soundtrack)
"Hands Up" (Lloyd Banks featuring 50 Cent)	2006	84	—	—	—	20	26	—	—	—	43		Rotten Apple
"Cake" (Lloyd Banks featuring 50 Cent)	2006	—	—	—	—	—	—	—	—	—	—		Rotten Apple
"Creep" (Mobb Deep featuring 50 Cent)	2006	—	—	—	—	—	—	—	—	—	—		Blood Money
"Can't Leave 'em Alone" (Ciara featuring 50 Cent)	2007	40	—	—	—	44	—	4	—	67	109	RIAA: Gold; RMNZ: Platinum	Ciara: The Evolution
"Crack a Bottle" (Eminem featuring Dr. Dre and 50 Cent)	2009	1	18	39	1	—	6	6	9	4	4	RIAA: 3× Platinum; ARIA: 2× Platinum; BPI: Gold; RMNZ: Platinum	Relapse
"Mujeres in the Club" (Wisin & Yandel featuring 50 Cent)	2009	—	—	—	—	—	—	—	—	—	—		La Revolución
"Pass the Patron" (Tony Yayo featuring 50 Cent)	2010	—	—	—	—	—	—	—	—	—	—		Non-album singles
"Let's Get It In" (Lloyd featuring 50 Cent)	2010	—	—	—	—	—	—	—	—	—	—		Non-album singles
"Down on Me" (Jeremih featuring 50 Cent)	2010	4	91	— (Note: "Down on Me" did not enter the Flanders Ultratop 50, but peaked at number 14 on the Ultratip chart.)	22	—	—	—	37	75	30	RIAA: 4× Platinum; BPI: Platinum; RMNZ: 2× Platinum	All About You
"Buzzin'" (Mann featuring 50 Cent)	2010	61	—	—	—	—	20	—	—	—	6	BPI: Gold	Mann's World
"No Dejemos Que se Apague" (Wisin & Yandel featuring 50 Cent and T-Pain)	2010	—	—	—	—	—	—	—	—	—	—		Los Vaqueros: El Regreso
"Here We Go Again" (Governor featuring 50 Cent)	2010	—	—	—	—	—	—	—	—	—	—		A Touch of Magic
"Haters" (Tony Yayo featuring 50 Cent, Shawty Lo and Roscoe Dash)	2011	—	—	—	—	—	—	—	—	—	—		Non-album single
"Right There" (Nicole Scherzinger featuring 50 Cent)	2011	39	8	—	44	61	7	7	—	—	3	RIAA: Gold; ARIA: 2× Platinum; BPI: Gold; RMNZ: Platinum	Killer Love
"Up!" (LoveRance featuring 50 Cent)	2011	46	—	—	—	—	—	—	—	—	—	RIAA: Gold	Non-album single
"Everything OK" (Precious Paris featuring 50 Cent)	2012	—	—	—	—	—	—	—	—	—	—		From Paris with Love
"Hate Bein' Sober" (Chief Keef featuring 50 Cent and Wiz Khalifa)	2012	— (Note: "Hate Bein' Sober" did not enter the Billboard Hot 100, but peaked at number nine on the Bubbling Under Hot 100 Singles chart, which acts as an extension to the Hot 100.)	—	—	—	—	—	—	—	—	—	RIAA: 2× Platinum; RMNZ: Platinum	Finally Rich
"Wait a Minute" (Remix) (Phresher featuring Remy Ma and 50 Cent)	2016	—	—	—	—	—	—	—	—	—	—		Non-album single
"Nobody" (Rotimi featuring 50 Cent and T.I.)	2017	—	—	—	—	—	—	—	—	—	—		Jeep Music Vol. 1
"Petty" (Fre$h featuring 50 Cent and 2 Chainz)	2017	—	—	—	—	—	—	—	—	—	—		Non-album singles
"Get the Strap" (Uncle Murda featuring Casanova, 6ix9ine and 50 Cent)	2018	—	—	—	—	—	—	—	—	—	—		Non-album singles
"The Woo" (Pop Smoke featuring 50 Cent and Roddy Ricch)	2020	11	18	—	6	86	13	32	23	14	9	RIAA: 2× Platinum; ARIA: Platinum; BPI: Platinum; IFPI SWE: Gold; RMNZ: 2× Platinum	Shoot for the Stars, Aim for the Moon
"—" denotes a recording that did not chart or was not released in that territory.

== Other charted and certified songs ==
List of other charted and certified songs, with selected chart positions, showing year released and album name
Title	Year	Peak chart positions					Certifications	Album
Title	Year	US	US R&B	US Rap	NLD	UK	Certifications	Album
"Realest Niggas" (with The Notorious B.I.G.)	2002	— (Note: "Realest Niggas" did not enter the Billboard Hot 100, but peaked at number six on the Bubbling Under Hot 100 Singles chart, which acts as an extension to the Hot 100.)	30	21	—	—		Bad Boys II
"Heat"	2003	—	— (Note: "Heat" did not enter the Hot R&B/Hip-Hop Songs chart, but peaked at number 16 on the Bubbling Under R&B/Hip-Hop Singles chart, which acts as an extension to the Hot R&B/Hip-Hop Songs chart.)	—	—	—		Get Rich or Die Tryin'
"Patiently Waiting" (featuring Eminem)	2003	—	56	—	—	—	RIAA: Platinum; BPI: Silver; RMNZ: Gold	Get Rich or Die Tryin'
"Many Men (Wish Death)"	2003	—	— (Note: "Many Men (Wish Death)" did not enter the Hot R&B/Hip-Hop Songs chart, but peaked at number 11 on the Bubbling Under R&B/Hip-Hop Singles chart, which acts as an extension to the Hot R&B/Hip-Hop Songs chart.)	—	—	—	RIAA: 3× Platinum; BPI: Platinum; RMNZ: 4× Platinum	Get Rich or Die Tryin'
"What Up Gangsta"	2003	— (Note: "What Up Gangsta" did not enter the Billboard Hot 100, but peaked at number one on the Bubbling Under Hot 100 Singles chart, which acts as an extension to the Hot 100.)	26	16	—	—	RIAA: Gold; BPI: Silver; RMNZ: Gold	Get Rich or Die Tryin'
"Hail Mary" (with Eminem and Busta Rhymes)	2003	— (Note: "Hail Mary" did not enter the Billboard Hot 100, but peaked at number three on the Bubbling Under Hot 100 Singles chart, which acts as an extension to the Hot 100.)	33	18	—	—		Invasion Part II: Conspiracy Theory
"Dem Not Ready" (featuring Sean Paul)	2003	—	— (Note: "Dem Not Ready" did not enter the Hot R&B/Hip-Hop Songs chart, but peaked at number three on the Bubbling Under R&B/Hip-Hop Singles chart, which acts as an extension to the Hot R&B/Hip-Hop Songs chart.)	—	—	—		Bulletproof (G-Unit Pt. 5)
"Trust Nobody" (Paybak featuring 50 Cent)	2003	—	— (Note: "Trust Nobody" did not enter the Hot R&B/Hip-Hop Songs chart, but peaked at number 23 on the Bubbling Under R&B/Hip-Hop Singles chart, which acts as an extension to the Hot R&B/Hip-Hop Songs chart.)	—	—	—		Non-album singles
"Right Thurr" (featuring Young Buck)	2003	—	— (Note: "Right Thurr" did not enter the Hot R&B/Hip-Hop Songs chart, but peaked at number 20 on the Bubbling Under R&B/Hip-Hop Singles chart, which acts as an extension to the Hot R&B/Hip-Hop Songs chart.)	—	—	—		G-Unit Radio Part 3: Takin' It to the Streets
"Victory 2004" (P. Diddy featuring Notorious B.I.G., Busta Rhymes, 50 Cent and Lloyd Banks)	2004	—	61	—	—	—		Bad Boy's 10th Anniversary... The Hits
"Never Enough" (Eminem featuring 50 Cent and Nate Dogg)	2004	—	—	—	—	—	ARIA: Gold; RMNZ: Gold	Encore
"Piggy Bank"	2005	88	64	—	—	—		The Massacre
"Outta Control"	2005	92	— (Note: "Outta Control" did not enter the Hot R&B/Hip-Hop Songs chart, but peaked at number 21 on the Bubbling Under R&B/Hip-Hop Singles chart, which acts as an extension to the Hot R&B/Hip-Hop Songs chart.)	—	—	—		The Massacre
"In My Hood"	2005	—	— (Note: "In My Hood" did not enter the Hot R&B/Hip-Hop Songs chart, but peaked at number 13 on the Bubbling Under R&B/Hip-Hop Singles chart, which acts as an extension to the Hot R&B/Hip-Hop Songs chart.)	—	—	—		The Massacre
"Build You Up" (featuring Jamie Foxx)	2005	—	— (Note: "Build You Up" did not enter the Hot R&B/Hip-Hop Songs chart, but peaked at number 24 on the Bubbling Under R&B/Hip-Hop Singles chart, which acts as an extension to the Hot R&B/Hip-Hop Songs chart.)	—	—	—		The Massacre
"So Amazing" (featuring Olivia)	2005	—	— (Note: "So Amazing" did not enter the Hot R&B/Hip-Hop Songs chart, but peaked at number 25 on the Bubbling Under R&B/Hip-Hop Singles chart, which acts as an extension to the Hot R&B/Hip-Hop Songs chart.)	—	—	—		The Massacre
"Get In My Car"	2005	—	—	—	—	—	RMNZ: Gold	The Massacre
"When It Rains It Pours"	2005	—	—	—	—	—	RMNZ: Platinum	Get Rich or Die Tryin' (soundtrack)
"Just a Touch" (Funkmaster Flex featuring 50 Cent and Paul Wall)	2005	—	72	—	—	—		Car Show Tour
"Pearly Gates" (Mobb Deep featuring 50 Cent)	2006	—	— (Note: "Pearly Gates" did not enter the Hot R&B/Hip-Hop Songs chart, but peaked at number 23 on the Bubbling Under R&B/Hip-Hop Singles chart, which acts as an extension to the Hot R&B/Hip-Hop Songs chart.)	—	—	—		Blood Money
"The Re-Up" (with Eminem)	2006	— (Note: "The Re-Up" did not enter the Billboard Hot 100, but peaked at number 19 on the Bubbling Under Hot 100 Singles chart, which acts as an extension to the Hot 100.)	—	—	—	—		Eminem Presents: The Re-Up
"Funeral Music"	2007	—	— (Note: "Funeral Music" did not enter the Hot R&B/Hip-Hop Songs chart, but peaked at number four on the Bubbling Under R&B/Hip-Hop Singles chart, which acts as an extension to the Hot R&B/Hip-Hop Songs chart.)	—	—	—		Buck the World
"Peep Show" (featuring Eminem)	2007	— (Note: "Peep Show" did not enter the Billboard Hot 100, but peaked at number 16 on the Bubbling Under Hot 100 Singles chart, which acts as an extension to the Hot 100.)	—	—	—	—		Curtis
"Follow My Lead" (featuring Robin Thicke)	2007	—	— (Note: "Follow My Lead" did not enter the Hot R&B/Hip-Hop Songs chart, but peaked at number 18 on the Bubbling Under R&B/Hip-Hop Singles chart, which acts as an extension to the Hot R&B/Hip-Hop Songs chart.)	—	— (Note: "Follow My Lead" did not enter the Dutch Top 40, but peaked at number 11 on the Dutch Tipparade chart, which acts as a 30-song extension to the Dutch Top 40.)	—		Curtis
"Take It to the Top" (Freeway featuring 50 Cent)	2007	—	— (Note: "Take It to the Top" did not enter the Hot R&B/Hip-Hop Songs chart, but peaked at number 25 on the Bubbling Under R&B/Hip-Hop Singles chart, which acts as an extension to the Hot R&B/Hip-Hop Songs chart.)	—	—	—		Free at Last
"Tia Told Me"	2009	—	— (Note: "Tia Told Me" did not enter the Hot R&B/Hip-Hop Songs chart, but peaked at number 12 on the Bubbling Under R&B/Hip-Hop Singles chart, which acts as an extension to the Hot R&B/Hip-Hop Songs chart.)	—	—	—		Non-album single
"The Invitation"	2009	97	—	—	—	—		Before I Self Destruct
"Monster" (Note: On August 23, 2018, Sony admitted in court that the vocals on the three Cascio songs were not performed by Jackson and were instead recorded after his death by Jason Malachi.) (Artist credited as Michael Jackson featuring 50 Cent)	2010	—	—	—	—	197		Michael (2010 Edition)
"I'm on It"	2011	—	— (Note: "I'm on It" did not enter the Hot R&B/Hip-Hop Songs chart, but peaked at number three on the Bubbling Under R&B/Hip-Hop Singles chart, which acts as an extension to the Hot R&B/Hip-Hop Songs chart.)	—	—	—		Non-album single
"Remember the Name" (Ed Sheeran featuring Eminem and 50 Cent)	2019	57	22	19	—	—	BPI: Gold; RMNZ: Platinum	No.6 Collaborations Project

== Guest appearances ==
List of non-single guest appearances, with other performing artists, showing year released and album name
Title	Year	Other performer(s)	Album
"Let It Be"	1998	Allure	Woo (soundtrack)
"What'd You Come Here For?" (Remix)	1999	Trina & Tamara, Cam'ron	none
"Jerk"	2000	Next	Welcome II Nextasy
"U Know What's Up" (Millennium Rapdown Remix)	2000	Donell Jones, Xzibit, Pharoahe Monch, Fat Joe, Cuban Link, Treach	—N/a
"Bring It All to Me" (Remix)	2000	Blaque	Bring It On (soundtrack)
"I'm Gonna Be Alright" (Track Masters O.G. Remix)	2002	Jennifer Lopez	J to tha L–O! The Remixes
"Work It" (Remix)	2002	Missy Elliott	Under Construction
"Love Me"	2002	Eminem, Obie Trice	8 Mile (soundtrack)
"Rap Game"	2002	D12	8 Mile (soundtrack)
"Places to Go"	2002	none	8 Mile (soundtrack)
"Cry Me a River" (Remix Part One & Two)	2002	Justin Timberlake	none
"50 Shot Ya"	2003	DJ Kay Slay	Streetsweeper Vol. 1
"Let Me Be the 1"	2003	Mary J. Blige	Love & Life
"Realest Niggas"	2003	The Notorious B.I.G.	Bad Boys II (soundtrack)
"Shot Down"	2003	DMX, Styles P	Grand Champ
"We All Die One Day"	2003	Obie Trice, Eminem, Lloyd Banks, Tony Yayo	Cheers
"Blow It Out" (Remix)	2003	Ludacris	Chicken-n-Beer
"The Realest Killaz"	2003	2Pac	Tupac: Resurrection (soundtrack)
"Never Give Up"	2004	Soz	The Initiative
"Victory 2004"	2004	P. Diddy, The Notorious B.I.G., Busta Rhymes, Lloyd Banks	Bad Boy's 10th Anniversary... The Hits
"I Get High"	2004	Lloyd Banks, Snoop Dogg	The Hunger for More
"Warrior, Pt. 2"	2004	Lloyd Banks, Eminem, Nate Dogg	The Hunger for More
"I'm a Soldier"	2004	Young Buck	Straight Outta Cashville
"Bonafide Hustler"	2004	Young Buck, Tony Yayo	Straight Outta Cashville
"Never Enough"	2004	Eminem, Nate Dogg	Encore
"Spend Some Time"	2004	Eminem, Obie Trice, Stat Quo	Encore
"We Don't Give a Fuck"	2005	Tony Yayo, Lloyd Banks, Olivia	Thoughts of a Predicate Felon
"Big Boy Game"	2005	M.O.P.	St. Marxmen
"What If"	2005	none	Get Rich or Die Tryin' soundtrack
"Things Change"	2005	Spider Loc, Lloyd Banks	Get Rich or Die Tryin' soundtrack
"You Already Know"	2005	Lloyd Banks, Young Buck	Get Rich or Die Tryin' soundtrack
"When Death Becomes You"	2005	M.O.P.	Get Rich or Die Tryin' soundtrack
"We Both Think Alike"	2005	Olivia	Get Rich or Die Tryin' soundtrack
"You a Shooter"	2005	Mobb Deep	Get Rich or Die Tryin' soundtrack
"I Don't Know, Officer"	2005	Lloyd Banks, Ma$e, Spider Loc, Prodigy	Get Rich or Die Tryin' soundtrack
"Talk About Me"	2005	none	Get Rich or Die Tryin' soundtrack
"When It Rains It Pours"	2005	none	Get Rich or Die Tryin' soundtrack
"Cloud 9"	2005	Olivia	Get Rich or Die Tryin' soundtrack
"Forgive Me"	2005	Proof	Searching for Jerry Garcia
"Just a Touch"	2005	Funkmaster Flex, Paul Wall	Car Show Tour
"What You Know About Us"	2005	Spider Loc, Snoop Dogg	none
"Pearly Gates"	2006	Mobb Deep	Blood Money
"The Infamous"	2006	Mobb Deep	Blood Money
"It's Alright"	2006	Mobb Deep, Mary J. Blige	Blood Money
"Everywhere I Go"	2006	Obie Trice	Second Round's on Me
"Rotten Apple"	2006	Lloyd Banks, Prodigy	Rotten Apple
"L.A. Niggas"	2006	Spider Loc	Rags 2 Riches
"Nigga, What's Up"	2006	Lil Scrappy	Bred 2 Die Born 2 Live
"My Life"	2006	Lil Scrappy	Expect the Unexpected
"Spend Time"	2006	Lil Scrappy	Expect the Unexpected
"The Re-Up"	2006	Eminem	Eminem Presents: The Re-Up
"Ski Mask Way" (Eminem Remix)	2006	none	Eminem Presents: The Re-Up
"Officer Down"	2006	Kardinal Offishall	Canadian Coke
"Come and Get Me"	2007	Timbaland, Tony Yayo	Shock Value
"Hold On"	2007	Young Buck	Buck the World
"Funeral Music"	2007	none	Buck the World
"Take It to the Top"	2007	Freeway	Free at Last
"Sexy Ladies" (Remix)	2007	Justin Timberlake	FutureSex/LoveSounds(Deluxe)
"They Don't Bother Me"	2007	Young Buck, Spider Loc, Ma$e	They Don't Bother Me
"Queens"	2007	LL Cool J, Prodigy, Tony Yayo, Kool G Rap	none
"Paper Planes" (Remix)	2008	M.I.A.	none
"Slow Down" (Remix)	2008	Ciara	Fantasy Ride: The Mixtape
"Wanna Lick (Magic Stick, Pt. 2)"	2008	Lil' Kim	Ms. G.O.A.T.
"Feel My Heart Beat"	2008	LL Cool J	Exit 13
"Let the Beat Rock" (Boys Noize Megamix)	2009	The Black Eyed Peas	Invasion of Boom Boom Pow
"I Go Off"	2009	Beanie Sigel	none
"Me & My Music"	2009	Spider Loc, Lil' Fame	none
"Bitch" (Remix)	2010	E-40, Too $hort	none
"Fuck You" (Remix)	2010	Cee Lo Green	none
"Format"	2010	El DeBarge	Second Chance
"Mean Mug"	2010	Soulja Boy Tell'em	The DeAndre Way
"5 Senses" (Remix)	2010	Jeremih	none
"Like a G6" (Remix)	2010	Far East Movement	none
"Dump (It's Like That)"	2010	Jadakiss	none
"Toot It and Boot It" (Remix)	2010	YG, Ty Dolla $ign, Snoop Dogg	none
"Payback (P's and Q's)"	2010	Lloyd Banks	H.F.M. 2 (Hunger for More 2)
"Altered Ego"	2010	Bobby V	Fly on the Wall
"80's Baby"	2010	Busta Rhymes, Wyclef Jean	none
"Monster"	2010	Artist credited as Michael Jackson	Michael (2010 Edition)
"Syllables"	2010	Eminem, Dr. Dre, Jay-Z, Stat Quo, Cashis	none
"Better Walk"	2010	Kidd Kidd	none
"Wish Me Luck"	2011	Governor	none
"Raid"	2011	Pusha T, Pharrell Williams	Fear of God II: Let Us Pray
"Recently"	2011	Gucci Mane	Writing's on the Wall 2
"In the Dark" (Remix)	2011	Dev	none
"The Enforcer"	2011	none	Real Steel (soundtrack)
"Warning" (Remix)	2011	Uncle Murda, Mariah Carey, Young Jeezy	none
"Headgames"	2012	Erick Sermon, Keith Murray	Breath of Fresh Air
"I'm a Stop"	2012	Too $hort, Devin the Dude, Twista	No Trespassing
"Do Your Thing"	2012	Precious Paris, Kidd Kidd, Shaun White	From Paris with Love
"No Hesitation"	2012	Precious Paris, Twame	From Paris with Love
"Trick"	2012	Precious Paris	From Paris with Love
"Telescope"	2012	Wiz Khalifa	none
"Talk of the Town"	2012	Shawty Lo	Million Dollar Man
"New York Times"	2013	J. Cole, Bas	Born Sinner
"Move"	2013	Tony Yayo, Kidd Kidd	Godfather of the Ghetto
"Free Again"	2014	DJ Kay Slay, Fat Joe	none
"Mary Jane" (Remix)	2014	Joe	Bridges
"Tonight"	2014	Choo Biggz, Tank	none
"Show You"	2014	Iamsu!, Jay Ant	none
"Cuffin Season" (Remix)	2014	Fabolous	none
"El Sobreviviente"	2014	Wisin	El Regreso del Sobreviviente
"I Bet"	2015	Chris Brown, Tyga	Fan of a Fan: The Album
"Drug Money"	2015	Young Buck, Troy Ave	none
"Get Paid"	2015	Lil Boosie	Every Ghetto, Every City
"Annie"	2015	Gio Washington	Power (soundtrack)
"Why You Mad at Me?" (Remix)	2015	Remo the Hitmaker	none
"Bang Bang"	2015	Troy Ave	Major Without a Deal
"Birthday"	2015	Elle Varner	4 Letter Word
"Lotto"	2015	Rotimi	none
"Drama Never Ends"	2015	none	Southpaw: (soundtrack)
"New Chick"	2015	Jonn Hart, Rizselfmade	Hart 2 Heart 3
"Still Here"	2015	Kidd Kidd, Tysone	Fuk Da Fame
"Choices (Yup)" (Remix)	2015	E-40, Snoop Dogg	none
"Comfortable" (Remix)	2015	K Camp, Akon	You Welcome
"I Wanna Benz"	2015	YG, Nipsey Hussle	none
"New Chick" (Remix)	2015	John Hart, Kid Ink, Rizselfmade	none
"It's Murda"	2016	Prodigy	R.I.P. 1
"This Big"	2016	DJ Spinking, Ty Dolla $ign Jeremih	For The Culture
"The Plan"	2016	Spider Loc	The Lost Tapes
"Color Blind"	2016	Spider Loc, Mack 10	The Lost Tapes
"Til Daylight"	2016	Spider Loc	The Lost Tapes
"Lonely Day"	2016	Spider Loc	The Lost Tapes
"California"	2016	Spider Loc	The Lost Tapes
"Nobody"	2017	Rotimi, T.I.	none
"Petty"	2017	Fre$h, 2 Chainz	none
"SKWIL"	2017	Big Moeses	none
"Statute of Limitations"	2017	Uncle Murda	Don't Come Outside
"Pieces"	2018	Tory Lanez	Memories Don't Die
"Is This Love ('09)"	2022	Eminem	Curtain Call 2
"Si Salimos"	2023	Eladio Carrion	3men2 Kbrn
"Office Hours"	2023	Nas	Magic 2
"Beep Beep"	2023	Nicki Minaj	Pink Friday 2
"Gunz n Smoke"	2024	Snoop Dogg, Eminem	Missionary

== Production discography ==
List of songwriting credits (excluding guest appearances, interpolations, and samples)
Track(s)	Year	Credit	Artist(s)	Album
4. "Paradise" (featuring Amerie)	2002	Songwriter	LL Cool J	10
—N/a	2004	Executive producer	The Game	The Documentary
5. "Higher"	2004	Songwriter	The Game	The Documentary
8. "Church for Thugs"	2004	Songwriter	The Game	The Documentary
16. "Special" (featuring Nate Dogg)	2004	Songwriter	The Game	The Documentary
—N/a	2020	Executive producer	Pop Smoke	Shoot for the Stars, Aim for the Moon

== See also ==
- 50 Cent albums discography
- G-Unit discography
