= 50 Cent albums discography =

50 Cent discography
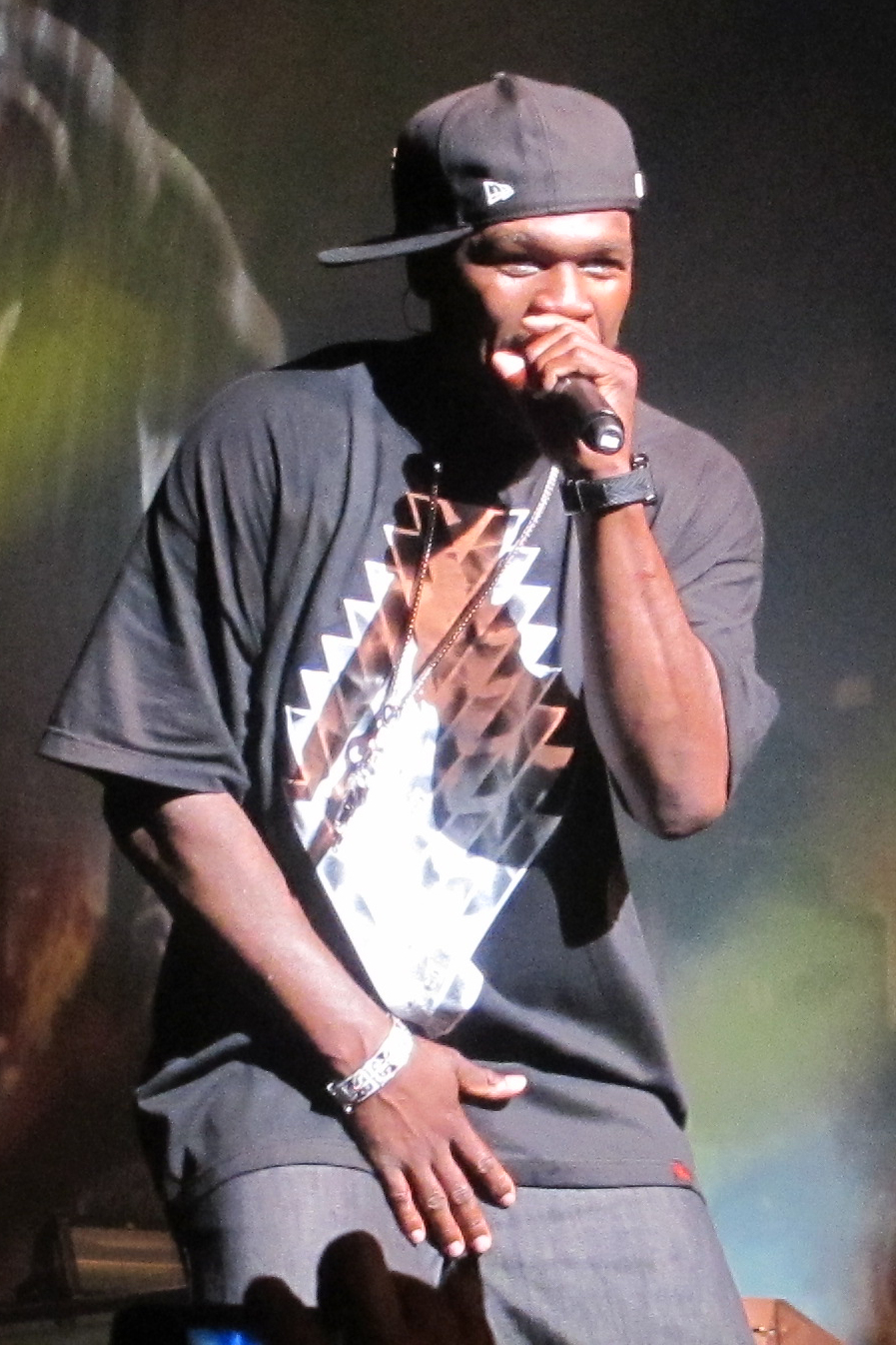
- Studio albums: 5
- Extended plays: 1
- Soundtrack albums: 2
- Compilation albums: 2
- Video albums: 2
- Music videos: 88
- Mixtapes: 10

American rapper 50 Cent has released five studio albums, ten mixtapes, two video albums, four compilation albums, two soundtrack album, 76 singles (including 26 as a featured artist), and 88 music videos. As of July 2014, he is the sixth best-selling hip-hop artist of the Nielsen SoundScan era with 16,786,000 albums sold in the US. 50 Cent signed to Shady Records in 2002 and released his debut studio album, Get Rich or Die Tryin', on February 6, 2003. The album peaked at number one in the US Billboard 200 and performed well in international markets. It features the number-one singles "In da Club" and "21 Questions" and also includes the singles "P.I.M.P." and "If I Can't". 50 Cent collaborated with American rapper Lil' Kim on "Magic Stick", which peaked at number two in the US.

In 2005, he released his second studio album, The Massacre. The album charted at number one in the US, as well as reaching the top ten on many album charts worldwide, and sold 4.83 million copies in the United States in 2005, the second highest sales count by any album that year. The Massacre includes the US top-three hits "Disco Inferno" and "Just a Lil Bit", and the US number-one hit "Candy Shop", which peaked in the top ten of many charts worldwide. A reissue of The Massacre produced the single "Outta Control", which peaked at number six in the US. In November 2005, 50 Cent starred in the movie Get Rich or Die Tryin', and recorded four singles for the film's soundtrack: the international hits "Hustler's Ambition" and "Window Shopper", and also "Best Friend" and "I'll Whip Ya Head Boy".

In 2007, 50 Cent's third studio album, Curtis, debuted at number two on the Billboard 200, behind Kanye West's album Graduation, after a much-hyped sales competition between the albums. Five singles were released from the album, including international hit "Ayo Technology" and Billboard hits "Straight to the Bank", "Amusement Park", "I Get Money" and "I'll Still Kill". In 2009, he released his fourth studio album, Before I Self Destruct. Music critics described the album as a return to the darker, more intense style of music that 50 Cent exhibited on many of his early mixtapes. The album charted at number five on the Billboard 200 and peaked in the top twenty of several album charts worldwide. The album features two singles: the international hit "Baby by Me", which peaked at number twenty-eight in the US, and "Do You Think About Me".

In June 2014, 50 Cent released his fifth studio album, Animal Ambition. The album debuted at number four on the US Billboard 200, giving 50 Cent his fifth consecutive top five album in the country, while also debuting at number one on Billboard's Independent Albums chart. All of the songs on the standard edition of the album were released as singles prior to the album being delivered to the public. His shelved studio album, then-titled Street King Immortal, was preceded by the release of the non-album song "Outlaw", which peaked at number eighty-seven in both the US and Canada, and a free download album – 5 (Murder by Numbers) – on July 6, 2012. Four songs were released in promotion for Street King Immortal: "New Day", "My Life", which reached number two on the UK Singles Chart, "Major Distribution", and "We Up", but the songs were scrapped and the album has been delayed numerous times before officially being scrapped in July 2021.

== Studio albums ==
List of studio albums, with selected chart positions, sales figures and certifications
Title	Album details	Peak chart positions										Sales	Certifications
Title	Album details	US	AUS	BEL (FL)	CAN	GER	IRL	NZ	SWE	SWI	UK	Sales	Certifications
Get Rich or Die Tryin'	Released: February 6, 2003 (US); Label: G-Unit, Shady, Aftermath, Interscope; Format: CD, LP, cassette, digital download	1	4	3	1	4	4	3	8	8	2	US: 9,000,000; Worldwide: 12,000,000	RIAA: 9× Platinum; ARIA: 2× Platinum; BEA: Platinum; BPI: 6× Platinum; BVMI: Gold; IFPI SWE: Gold; IFPI SWI: Platinum; IRMA: Platinum; MC: 6× Platinum; RMNZ: 5× Platinum
The Massacre	Released: March 3, 2005 (US); Label: G-Unit, Shady, Aftermath, Interscope; Format: CD, LP, cassette, digital download	1	2	3	1	1	1	1	10	2	1	US: 6,000,000; Worldwide: 9,000,000	RIAA: 6× Platinum; ARIA: Platinum; BEA: Gold; BPI: 3× Platinum; BVMI: 2× Platinum; IFPI SWI: Platinum; IRMA: 2× Platinum; MC: 3× Platinum; RMNZ: 5× Platinum
Curtis	Released: September 11, 2007 (US); Label: G-Unit, Shady, Aftermath, Interscope; Format: CD, LP, cassette, digital download	2	1	3	2	2	1	1	10	1	2	US: 1,336,000; Worldwide: 3,000,000	RIAA: Gold; ARIA: Platinum; BEA: Gold; BPI: Platinum; BVMI: Gold; IRMA: Platinum; RMNZ: Platinum
Before I Self Destruct	Released: November 16, 2009 (US); Label: G-Unit, Shady, Aftermath, Interscope; Format: CD, LP, cassette, digital download	5	19	34	11	36	18	35	—	13	22	US: 512,000; Worldwide: 1,000,000	RIAA: Gold; BPI: Gold; RMNZ: Gold
Animal Ambition	Released: June 3, 2014 (US); Label: G-Unit, Caroline; Format: CD, LP, cassette, digital download	4	16	12	4	35	29	8	9	17	21	US: 124,000	
"—" denotes a recording that did not chart or was not released in that territory.

== Compilation albums ==
List of compilation albums, with selected chart positions and certifications
Title	Album details	Peak chart positions						Certifications
Title	Album details	US	US R&B	US Rap	BEL (FL)	CAN	UK	Certifications
24 Shots	Released: 2003 (US); Label: Full Clip, Shady, Aftermath, Interscope; Format: CD, LP, digital download	—	—	—	—	—	—	
Best of 50 Cent	Released: March 31, 2017 (US); Label: Shady, Aftermath, Interscope; Format: CD, LP, digital download	95	—	—	167	36	23	BPI: 3× Platinum
"—" denotes a recording that did not chart or was not released in that territory.

== Soundtracks ==
List of soundtrack albums, with selected chart positions, sales figures and certifications
Title	Album details	Peak chart positions										Sales	Certifications
Title	Album details	US	AUS	BEL (FL)	CAN	FRA	GER	NLD	NZ	SWI	UK	Sales	Certifications
Get Rich or Die Tryin' soundtrack (with various artists)	Released: November 8, 2005 (US); Label: G-Unit, Interscope; Format: CD, LP, digital download	2	22	50	2	35	15	54	19	23	18	US: 1,000,000; Worldwide: 3,000,000	RIAA: Platinum; BPI: Gold; RMNZ: Gold
Bulletproof	Released: November 17, 2005 (US); Label: G-Unit, Shadyville; Format: CD, LP, digital download	—	—	—	—	—	—	—	—	—	—		

== Mixtapes ==
List of mixtapes, with selected chart positions
Title	Album details	Peak chart positions				
Title	Album details	US Ind.	US R&B	NLD	SWI	UK
Guess Who's Back?	Released: April 26, 2002; Label: Full Clip; Format: CD, digital download	1	13	93	—	82
50 Cent Is the Future (with G-Unit)	Released: June 1, 2002 (US); Label: BCD Music Group; Format: CD, digital download	—	—	—	59	65
No Mercy, No Fear (with G-Unit)	Released: August 1, 2002 (US); Label: BCD Music Group; Format: CD, digital download	—	—	—	—	—
God's Plan (with G-Unit)	Released: October 4, 2002 (US); Label: BCD Music Group; Format: CD, digital download	—	—	—	—	—
Bullet Proof (with DJ Whoo Kid)	Released: 2005 (US); Label: Self-released; Format: Digital download	—	—	—	—	—
War Angel LP	Released: June 16, 2009 (US); Label: Modulor; Format: Digital download	—	—	—	—	—
Forever King	Released: July 3, 2009 (US); Label: Queens Boulevard Recordings; Format: Digital download	—	—	—	—	—
The Big 10	Released: December 9, 2011 (US); Label: Self-released; Format: Digital download	—	—	—	—	—
The Lost Tape (with DJ Drama)	Released: May 22, 2012 (US); Label: Self-released; Format: Digital download	—	—	—	—	—
5 (Murder by Numbers)	Released: July 6, 2012 (US); Label: Self-released; Format: Digital download	—	—	—	—	—
The Kanan Tape	Released: December 9, 2015 (US); Label: G-Unit; Format: Digital download	—	—	—	—	—
"—" denotes a recording that did not chart or was not released in that territory.

== EPs ==
List of miscellaneous albums, with selected information
Title	Album details	Notes
Power of the Dollar	Released: September 12, 2000; Label: Columbia, Sony, Trackmasters Entertainment; Format: CD	Officially released EP version of the unreleased album of the same name.

== Video albums ==
List of video albums, with selected chart positions, sales figures, certifications and information
Title	Album details	Peak chart positions		Sales	Certifications	Notes
Title	Album details	US	US R&B	Sales	Certifications	Notes
Get Rich or Die Tryin'	Released: February 6, 2003 (US); Label: Interscope, Shady, Aftermath, G-Unit; Format: CD/DVD, digital download	—	—			Original album with bonus DVD featuring behind-the-scenes footage, interviews, music videos, and live performances.
50 Cent: The New Breed	Released: April 15, 2003 (US); Label: Shady, Aftermath, Interscope; Format: CD/DVD, digital download	2	1	US: 645,000	RIAA: Gold; ARIA: Platinum; BPI: Gold	DVD containing documentary footage, music videos, and live performances. Bonus CD features three songs, two of which are exclusive.
"—" denotes a recording that did not chart or was not released in that territory.

== Miscellaneous ==
List of miscellaneous albums, with selected information
Title	Album details	Notes
Power of the Dollar	Unreleased; Label: Columbia, Trackmasters Entertainment; Format: Bootleg CD/digital download	Originally meant to be released as 50 Cent's debut studio album; however, its release was cancelled after 50 Cent was dropped from the label after being injured in a shooting two months before the album was set to release.
Street King Immortal	Unreleased; Shady Records, Aftermath Entertainment, G-Unit Records, Interscope Records, Universal Music Group	Originally meant to be released as 50 Cent's sixth studio album; however, it was scrapped after facing numerous delays and spending nearly a decade in development hell.

== See also ==
- 50 Cent singles discography
- G-Unit discography
