= Best of 50 Cent =

Greatest hits album by 50 Cent
- Released: March 31, 2017
- Recorded: 1998–2009
- Genres: Hip hop; gangsta rap
- Length: 66:42
- Labels: Shady; Aftermath; Interscope

50 Cent chronology
The Kanan Tape (2015)	Best of 50 Cent (2017)	Street King Immortal (cancelled)

Professional ratings
Review scores
Source	Rating
AllMusic	4/5 stars

Best of 50 Cent is a greatest hits album by American rapper 50 Cent. It was released on March 31, 2017, by Shady Records, Aftermath Entertainment and Interscope Records. The compilation includes tracks from five of his previous studio albums: Power of the Dollar (2000), Get Rich or Die Tryin' (2003), The Massacre (2005), Curtis (2007) and Before I Self Destruct (2009). Also included are songs from the soundtrack to the film Get Rich or Die Tryin' (2005). It also includes the non-album singles "Get Up" and "I Get It In". Best of 50 Cent anthologizes the majority of the singles that 50 Cent released during his joint deals with Eminem's Shady, Dr. Dre's Aftermath, and major-label Interscope. This is the first Shady Records album that does not feature Eminem on a song.

== Background and promotion ==
In 2002, 50 Cent signed a five-album deal with Interscope Records, which also included a greatest hits album. In June 2007, 50 Cent said: "Before I Self Destruct is scheduled to be released February 4, which is the anniversary of Get Rich or Die Tryin'. And it'll be my final studio recording for where I'm at, for my deal. I did a five-album deal, and the fifth album is a greatest-hits CD". However, 50 Cent planned to release one more studio album under Interscope, but went on to ask for his release in 2014, due to frustration with how the label was handling the promotion for Street King Immortal.

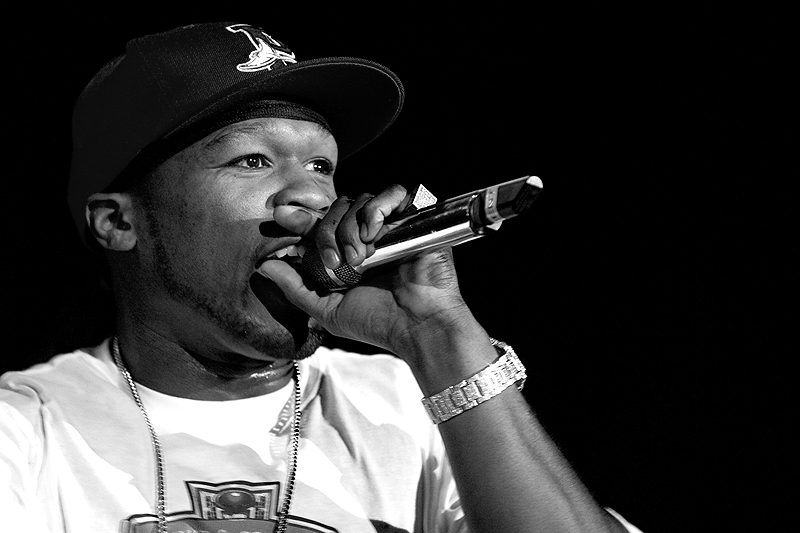
At a 2007 concert

In February 2017, the album was announced by Universal Music Enterprises (UMe). It was announced for a March 31, 2017 release, 14 years after his breakthrough debut album Get Rich or Die Tryin'. The 18 track collection was also announced to be available in all formats, including digital, CD and LP, with the vinyl announced for an April 7, 2017 release.

== Content ==
Best of 50 Cent contains 18 tracks spanning 11 years of music from 50 Cent's career, including collaborative work with Nate Dogg, Olivia, Justin Timberlake and other artists. Four tracks come from Curtis, the most to be featured from one album. "How to Rob", representing the oldest material on the compilation, is the only song from 50 Cent's unreleased 2000 album Power of the Dollar. "In da Club", "21 Questions" and "P.I.M.P.", all appeared on 50 Cent's 2003 major-label debut album Get Rich or Die Tryin'. "Hustler's Ambition", "Best Friend" and "Window Shopper", were all songs included on Music from and Inspired by the Motion Picture Get Rich or Die Tryin'

== Track listing ==
Track listing adapted from AllMusic, including entries for Power of the Dollar, Get Rich or Die Tryin', The Massacre, and Music from and Inspired by the Motion Picture Get Rich or Die Tryin'. "How to Rob" contains the unreleased version containing the diss to Mariah Carey and Tommy Mottola.

No.	Title	Writer(s)	Producer(s)	Length
1.	"In da Club"	Curtis Jackson; Andre Young; Mike Elizondo	Dr. Dre; Elizondo	3:13
2.	"21 Questions" (featuring Nate Dogg)	Jackson; Kevin Risto; Jimmy Cameron; Vela Cameron	Dirty Swift	3:44
3.	"P.I.M.P."	Jackson; Denaun Porter	Mr. Porter	4:09
4.	"Disco Inferno"	Jackson; Teraike "C. Styles" Crawford; Phillip "Bang Out" Pitts	Dangerous LLC	3:34
5.	"Candy Shop" (featuring Olivia)	Jackson; Scott Storch	Storch	3:26
6.	"Just a Lil Bit"	Jackson; Storch	Storch	3:57
7.	"Outta Control (Remix)" (featuring Mobb Deep)	Jackson; Young; Elizondo; Christopher Pope; Steve Standard; Kejuan Muchita; Albert Johnson	Dr. Dre; Elizondo	4:06
8.	"Hustler's Ambition"	Jackson; Brian Hughes; Frankie Beverly	B-Money "B$"	3:57
9.	"Best Friend (Remix)" (featuring Olivia)	Jackson; Tony Cottrell	Hi-Tek	4:14
10.	"Window Shopper"	Crawford; Jackson; Robert Marley; J.H. Turnbull	C. Styles; Sire	3:10
11.	"Ayo Technology" (featuring Justin Timberlake and Timbaland)	Jackson; Timothy Mosley; Justin Timberlake; Nate Hills	Timbaland; Danja	4:07
12.	"I Get Money"	Jackson; William Stanberry; Kirk Robinson	Apex	3:43
13.	"Straight to the Bank"	Jackson; Young; Tyrone Fyffe	Ty Fyffe; Dr. Dre	3:10
14.	"I'll Still Kill" (featuring Akon)	Jackson; Aliaume Thiam; Khalil Abdul-Rahman; Brian Honeycutt	DJ Khalil	3:41
15.	"Get Up"	Jackson; Storch	Storch	3:13
16.	"I Get It In"	Jackson; Mark Batson; Young; Dawaun Parker; Trevor Lawrence	Dr. Dre	3:19
17.	"Baby by Me" (featuring Ne-Yo)	Jackson; Jamal Jones; Shaffer Smith	Polow da Don; William Tyler	3:33
18.	"How to Rob" (bonus track) (featuring The Madd Rapper)	Deric Angelettie; Harry Wayne Casey; Jackson; Jean-Claude Olivier; Samuel Barnes	Trackmasters	4:25
Total length:				66:42

== Charts ==
=== Weekly charts ===
Weekly chart performance for Best of 50 Cent
Chart (2017–2026)	Peak position
Belgian Albums (Ultratop Flanders)	167
Belgian Albums (Ultratop Wallonia)	194
Canadian Albums (Billboard)	36
Greek Albums (IFPI)	19
Irish Albums (Official Charts)	18
UK Albums (Official Charts)	23
US Billboard 200	95

=== Year-end charts ===
2022 year-end chart performance for Best of 50 Cent
Chart (2022)	Position
UK Albums (OCC)	51

2023 year-end chart performance for Best of 50 Cent
Chart (2023)	Position
UK Albums (OCC)	44

2024 year-end chart performance for Best of 50 Cent
Chart (2024)	Position
UK Albums (OCC)	41

2025 year-end chart performance for Best of 50 Cent
Chart (2025)	Position
UK Albums (OCC)	40

== Certifications ==
Certifications for Best of 50 Cent
Region	Certification	Certified units/sales
France (SNEP)	Platinum	100,000^{‡}
United Kingdom (BPI)	3× Platinum	900,000^{‡}
^{‡} Sales+streaming figures based on certification alone.

== See also ==
- List of greatest hits albums
