= Get Low =

Get Low may refer to:

== Film and television ==
- Get Low (film), a 2009 film starring Robert Duvall and Bill Murray

== Music ==
Labels

- Get Low Recordz, a San Francisco-based independent record label
- Get Low Records, a hip hop record label

Albums

- Get Low (album), a 2009 album by Romeo

Songs

- "Get Low" (Lil Jon & the East Side Boyz song), 2003
- "Get Low" (Waka Flocka Flame song), 2012
- "Get Low" (Dillon Francis and DJ Snake song), 2014
- "Get Low" (50 Cent song), 2015
- "Get Low" (Zedd and Liam Payne song), 2017
- "Get Low", a song by Lloyd Banks from the Get Rich or Die Tryin' soundtrack
- "Get Low", a song by Stat Quo from Eminem Presents: The Re-Up

== See also ==
- Gitlow v. New York, a landmark United States Supreme Court case
