= Get Rich or Die Tryin' (disambiguation) =

Get Rich or Die Tryin' is a 2003 album by American rapper 50 Cent.

Get Rich or Die Tryin' may also refer to:

- Get Rich or Die Tryin' (film), 2005 crime drama starring 50 Cent
- Get Rich or Die Tryin' (soundtrack), the film's soundtrack
