= 50 Cent discography =

50 Cent discography encompasses:

- 50 Cent albums discography, a list of albums released by 50 Cent
- 50 Cent singles discography, a list of singles released by 50 Cent

== See also ==
- 50 Cent videography, a list of music videos, video albums and other media appearances by 50 Cent
