= I'm the Man (50 Cent song) =

2015 single by 50 Cent

Single by 50 Cent featuring Sonny Digital

from the album The Kanan Tape
- Released: December 4, 2015
- Genre: Hip hop; R&B
- Length: 3:56
- Label: Capitol; G-Unit
- Songwriters: Curtis Jackson; Sonny Uwaezuoke
- Producer: Sonny Digital

50 Cent singles chronology
"Too Rich For the Bitch" (2015)	"I'm the Man" (2015)	"I'm the Man (Remix)" (2016)

Sonny Digital singles chronology
"I'm the Man" (2016)

"I'm the Man" is a song by American hip hop recording artist Sonny Digital originally released on SoundCloud. After hearing the song, 50 Cent reached out to purchase the song from Sonny Digital, he agreed on the selling it with the only stipulation be that 50 couldn’t change the hook or production. 50 cent released it on December 4, 2015 as the third single from his eleventh mixtape, The Kanan Tape (2015). The hip hop song features vocals and production from Sonny Digital. It was released for digital download on February 12, 2016.

== Music video ==
On January 1, 2016, 50 Cent uploaded the music video for "I'm the Man" on his YouTube account.

== Track listing ==
- Download digital
1. I'm the Man (featuring Sonny Digital) — 3:55

== Remix ==
"I'm the Man (Remix)"

Single by 50 Cent featuring Chris Brown
- Released: May 6, 2016
- Recorded: 2016
- Genre: Hip hop; R&B
- Length: 3:55
- Label: G-Unit
- Songwriters: Curtis Jackson; Sonny Uwaezuoke; Christopher Brown
- Producer: Sonny Digital

50 Cent singles chronology
"I'm the Man" (2016)	"I'm the Man (Remix)" (2016)	"No Romeo No Juliet" (2016)

Chris Brown single singles chronology
"Grass Ain't Greener" (2016)	"I'm the Man (Remix)" (2016)	"No Romeo No Juliet" (2016)

The official remix features vocals from recording artist Chris Brown and produced by Sonny Digital. It was released for digital download on May 6, 2016 as the single, with the record label G-Unit Records. It was also intended for 50 Cent’s shelved sixth studio album, Street King Immortal.

=== Track listing ===
- Download digital
1. I'm the Man (Remix) (featuring Chris Brown) – 3:55

=== Music video ===
The music video for the remix version premiered on May 6, 2016, on his YouTube and Vevo account. It was directed by Eif Rivera. The end of the video features the preview from music video "No Romeo No Juliet" As of April 2024, the video has amassed over 320 million views.

== Charts ==
=== Weekly charts ===
==== Original version ====
Chart (2016)	Peak position
US Bubbling Under R&B/Hip-Hop Singles (Billboard)	2
US R&B/Hip-Hop Airplay (Billboard)	50

==== Remix version ====
Chart (2016)	Peak position
US Bubbling Under Hot 100 (Billboard)	10
US Hot R&B/Hip-Hop Songs (Billboard)	46

== Certifications ==
Region	Certification	Certified units/sales
Brazil (Pro-Música Brasil)	2× Platinum	120,000^{‡}
France (SNEP)	Gold	100,000^{‡}
New Zealand (RMNZ)	Platinum	30,000^{‡}
United Kingdom (BPI)	Silver	200,000^{‡}
United States (RIAA)	2× Platinum	2,000,000^{‡}
^{‡} Sales+streaming figures based on certification alone.
