= Best Friend (50 Cent song) =

Song by 50 Cent

Single by 50 Cent and Olivia

from the album Music from and Inspired by the Motion Picture Get Rich or Die Tryin'
- Released: November 8, 2005 (album version) • January 19, 2006 (Remix)
- Recorded: 2005
- Genre: Hip hop; R&B
- Length: 4:11
- Label: Shady; Aftermath; Interscope
- Songwriters: Curtis Jackson; Tony Cottrell; Jonathan Rotem; Jo Armstead; Nickolas Ashford; Valerie Simpson
- Producer: Hi-Tek

50 Cent singles chronology
"Window Shopper" (2005)	"Best Friend" (2005)	"I'll Whip Ya Head Boy" (2006)

Olivia singles chronology
"Wild 2nite" (2005)	"Best Friend" (2006)	"Chaise Électrique" (2009)

"Best Friend" is a song by American rapper 50 Cent released as a bonus track on the soundtrack of the film Get Rich or Die Tryin' (2005). A remix version featuring singer Olivia was released as a single.

== Release ==
The song was originally released in November, 2005 as a bonus track on the Get Rich or Die Tryin' soundtrack. In January, 2006 a remix featuring G-Unit member Olivia was released as a single on "12 only. The remix was set to be featured on Olivia's sophomore album, "Behind Closed Doors", which was ultimately shelved. The remix made its album debut in parts of Europe on 2006 editions of 50 Cent's The Massacre and Bulletproof soundtrack. In 2017 the remix was released worldwide on the greatest hits album Best of 50 Cent.

An official music video for the remix was released in 2006 featuring Olivia and cameos from G-Unit members Mobb Deep, Spider Loc and Hot Rod. The music video on YouTube has received over 175 million views as of April 2024.

== Background ==
The song, produced by Hi-Tek, samples "Silly, Wasn't I?" by Valerie Simpson and uses an interpolation of Biz Markie's "Just a Friend" for the chorus.

The song is used throughout the film Get Rich or Die Tryin' with the instrumental being substituted with the instrumental of "The Bridge Is Over" by KRS-One.

== Charts ==
=== Weekly charts ===
Chart (2006)	Peak position
US Billboard Hot 100	35
US Hot R&B/Hip-Hop Songs (Billboard)	22
US Pop 100 (Billboard)	52
US Hot Rap Songs (Billboard)	10
US Rhythmic Airplay (Billboard)	10

=== Year-end charts ===
Chart (2006)	Position
US Hot R&B/Hip-Hop Songs (Billboard)	90

== Certifications ==
Region	Certification	Certified units/sales
Brazil (Pro-Música Brasil)	Gold	30,000^{‡}
New Zealand (RMNZ)	3× Platinum	90,000^{‡}
United Kingdom (BPI)	Gold	400,000^{‡}
United States (RIAA)	Platinum	1,000,000^{‡}
^{‡} Sales+streaming figures based on certification alone.

== Release history ==
Region	Date	Format(s)	Label(s)	Ref.
United States	February 21, 2006	Rhythmic contemporary radio	G-Unit, Shady, Interscope	
