= We Up =

Single by 50 Cent featuring Kendrick Lamar
- Released: March 25, 2013
- Genre: Hip-hop
- Length: 3:18
- Label: Shady; Aftermath; G-Unit; Interscope; Universal
- Songwriters: Curtis Jackson; Davaughn Lennard; Kendrick Duckworth; Guy-Manuel de Homem-Christo; Thomas Bangalter
- Producer: Davaughn

50 Cent singles chronology
| "Major Distribution" (2013) | "We Up" (2013) | "Don't Worry 'Bout It" (2014) |

Kendrick Lamar singles chronology
| "Bitch, Don't Kill My Vibe" (2013) | "We Up" (2013) | "Memories Back Then" (2013) |

"We Up" is a song by American hip-hop artist 50 Cent. It was released as the third single from his shelved studio album, Street King Immortal, and his last to be released under Shady/Aftermath. It was officially released to public on March 22, 2013, on Interscope Records' SoundCloud account, and made available for purchase on March 25, 2013. The song features American rapper and Aftermath labelmate Kendrick Lamar, and production from Roc Nation producer Davaughn. It uses a sample from "Something About Us" by Daft Punk, who received a songwriting credit. The song was released to Rhythmic contemporary radio on May 28, 2013.

== Background ==
A different version of the song came out as a preview in January featuring 50 Cent's two verses and one by Kidd Kidd, which was later removed from the final version of the song. It was also intended to be a song of Kidd Kidd's mixtape, but ended up being 50 Cent's song. The full version of it, featuring Kidd Kidd, Kendrick Lamar and only one verse by 50 Cent, was released on February 15, 2013.

The single version of 'We Up' was released on March 22, 2013, with Kidd Kidd removed from the track. A verse by 50 previewed in January, which wasn't on its full version, was re-added to it. It was made available for purchase on digital retailers, such as Amazon.com and iTunes Store, on March 25, 2013.

== Music video ==
Two music videos were shot, for different versions of the song. The first one released, called "video before the video", didn't include appearances from Kendrick Lamar though his verse was still played. It had 50 Cent and Kidd Kidd in it, holding bottles and wearing suits while singing their parts as it was already shown in the song's preview.

The video for song's single version was shot in Los Angeles. A behind-the-scenes video was featured in VH1's series Behind the Music mastered episode of 50 Cent aired in March. It came out on March 25, 2013, on 50 Cent's VEVO channel. Both videos were directed by fellow video director Eif Rivera.

The music video on YouTube has received over 60 million views as of April 2024.

== Live performances ==
While performing at Roseland Ballroom in New York City on February 27, 2013, Kendrick Lamar brought out 50 Cent for We Up's performance, along with G-Unit rapper Tony Yayo.

== Track listing ==
Digital download

1. "We Up" (featuring Kendrick Lamar) - 3:18

== Credits and personnel ==
- Songwriter(s) – Curtis Jackson, Davaughn Lennard, Kendrick Duckworth, Guy-Manuel de Homem-Christo, Thomas Bangalter
- Producer – Davaughn

== Chart performance ==
=== Weekly charts ===
| Chart (2013) | Peak position |
|---|---|
| Belgium (Ultratop Flanders Urban) | 32 |
| Canada Hot 100 (Billboard) | 85 |
| France (SNEP) | 135 |
| South Korea (GAON) | 25 |
| US Hot R&B/Hip-Hop Songs (Billboard) | 50 |

== Release history ==
| Country | Date | Format | Label | Ref |
|---|---|---|---|---|
| Worldwide | March 25, 2013 | Digital download | Shady; Aftermath; Interscope | |
| United States | May 28, 2013 | Rhythmic contemporary radio | Shady; Aftermath; Interscope | |
