= I'll Whip Ya Head Boy =

- MOP Remix Cover

Single by 50 Cent featuring Young Buck and M.O.P.

from the album Music From and Inspired by the Motion Picture Get Rich or Die Tryin'
- Released: January 24, 2006
- Genre: Hip hop; gangsta rap; hardcore hip hop
- Length: 3:56
- Label: G-Unit; Interscope
- Songwriters: Curtis Jackson; David Darnell Brown; Rondell Edwin Turner
- Producer: Ron Browz

50 Cent singles chronology
"Best Friend" (2006)	"I'll Whip Ya Head Boy" (2006)	"Have a Party" (2006)

Young Buck singles chronology
"Look at Me Now" (2004)	"I'll Whip Ya Head Boy" (2006)	"Stay Fly" (2006)

"I'll Whip Ya Head Boy" is a song by American hip hop recording artist 50 Cent, released as the fourth and final single from the soundtrack to the film Get Rich or Die Tryin'. The song features Young Buck and is the closing track on the album. It is played in the intro of the film. The official remix features M.O.P. and was released as a promo single to USA radio stations.

== Composition and lyrics ==
Calling the song "especially affecting", Mike Schiller of PopMatters observed how "I'll Whip Ya Head Boy" is "full of hunger... the hunger for power on the streets", with 50 Cent's lyrics "...[giving] us a glimpse into a scattered, volatile mind prone to violence at any second"; he additionally described the production as "pushing a minor-key buzz into the listener's skull".

== Remixes ==
- "I'll Whip Ya Head Boy (Remix)" (feat. Young Buck and M.O.P.)
- "We Get That Bread" (feat. Young Buck, Lil Wayne and Juelz Santana)
- "Get That Bread" (Cassidy)
- "I'll Whip Ya Head Boy (Remix) (feat. Young Buck & Agallah)
- "Roger That" (Lil Wayne featuring Javon Black & Young Jeezy)

== Chart positions ==
Chart (2006)	Peak position
US Hot R&B/Hip-Hop Songs (Billboard)	74

== Certifications ==
Certifications for "I'll Whip Ya Head Boy"
Region	Certification	Certified units/sales
New Zealand (RMNZ)	Gold	15,000^{‡}
^{‡} Sales+streaming figures based on certification alone.
