= No Romeo No Juliet =

Single by 50 Cent featuring Chris Brown
- Released: May 11, 2016
- Recorded: 2016
- Genre: Hip hop; trap
- Length: 4:28
- Label: Capitol; G-Unit
- Songwriters: Curtis Jackson; Christopher Brown
- Producer: Arthur McArthur

50 Cent singles chronology
"I'm the Man (Remix)" (2016)	"No Romeo No Juliet" (2016)	"Nobody" (2017)

Chris Brown singles chronology
"I'm the Man (Remix)" (2016)	"No Romeo No Juliet" (2016)	"Do You Mind" (2016)

"No Romeo No Juliet" is a hip-hop song by American rapper 50 Cent. It was released for download on May 11, 2016 as the lead single from 50 Cent's unreleased mixtape, Kanan Reloaded (originally planned for release in 2016). The song was produced by Arthur McArthur and features vocals from American R&B singer and rapper Chris Brown.

== Music video ==
On June 22, 2016, 50 Cent uploaded the music video for "No Romeo No Juliet" on his YouTube account. The end of the video features the preview from music video "Tryna Fuck Me Over".

The music video on YouTube has received over 105 million views as of April 2024.

== Charts ==
Chart (2016)	Peak position
US Bubbling Under R&B/Hip-Hop Singles (Billboard)	5

== Release history ==
Region	Date	Format	Label	Ref.
United States	May 11, 2016	Download	G-Unit	
United Kingdom	May 11, 2016	Download	G-Unit	
