= The Kanan Tape =

- Cover art for 50 Cent’s 2015 mixtape The Kanan Tape.

Mixtape by 50 Cent
- Released: December 9, 2015
- Recorded: 2015; New York, Atlanta
- Genre: Hip hop
- Length: 25:04
- Label: G-Unit
- Producer: The Alchemist; BandPlay; Colt 45; Illmind; London on da Track; Scoop DeVille; Sonny Digital

50 Cent chronology
Animal Ambition (2014)	The Kanan Tape (2015)	Best Of (2017)

Singles from The Kanan Tape
- 1. "Body Bags" Released: November 13, 2015; 2. "Too Rich for the Bitch" Released: November 26, 2015; 3. "I'm the Man" Released: December 4, 2015

The Kanan Tape is a mixtape by American rapper 50 Cent, released on December 9, 2015, via his community website ThisIs50 and on Datpiff as a free download. The mixtape features guest appearances from American musicians Boosie, Post Malone and Young Buck, featuring production from London on da Track and the Alchemist, among others. The artwork was done by Timo Albert.

== Background ==
On October 13, 2015, 50 Cent announced plans for a project called The Kanan Tape. The mixtape is named after his character Kanan Stark on the Starz drama series Power.

== Critical reception ==
Professional ratings
Review scores
Source	Rating
HipHopDX	4/5
RapReviews	7/10

Reviewing The Kanan Tape for HipHopDX, Aaron McKrell praised the "fairly fantastic guest appearances"—including from Post Malone and Boosie Badazz—as well as the "top-notch" production, despite feeling that the best production was wasted. McKrell also criticized the mixtape's repetitiveness in spite of its short length, concluding: "By the time the closer, 'On Everything', rolls around, we've heard it all before and then some." In her review for RapReviews, Milli described The Kanan Tape as 50 Cent's "most cohesive body of work in a very long time".

== Track listing ==
No.	Title	Producer(s)	Length
1.	"Nigga" (featuring Lil Boosie and Young Buck)	BandPlay	4:42
2.	"Too Rich for the Bitch"	London on da Track	3:01
3.	"Body Bags"	The Alchemist	4:23
4.	"Tryna Fuck Me Over" (featuring Post Malone)	Scoop DeVille	2:43
5.	"I'm the Man" (featuring Sonny Digital)	Sonny Digital	3:55
6.	"Burner on Me"	Colt 45	3:28
7.	"On Everything"	Illmind	2:52
Total length:			25:04

== Charts ==
Chart (2016)	Peak position
UK R&B Albums (OCC)	38
