= Hustler's Ambition =

Single by 50 Cent

from the album Get Rich or Die Tryin': Music from and Inspired by the Motion Picture
- Released: October 11, 2005
- Recorded: 2005
- Genre: Hip hop
- Length: 3:58
- Label: Shady; G-Unit; Aftermath; Interscope
- Songwriters: Curtis Jackson; Brian Hughes; Frankie Beverly
- Producer: B-Money "B$"

50 Cent singles chronology
"Outta Control" (2005)	"Hustler's Ambition" (2005)	"I Know You Don't Love Me" (2005)

"Hustler's Ambition" is a song by American rapper 50 Cent. Written by 50 Cent and produced by B-Money "B$", the song was released as the first single from the soundtrack to the film Get Rich or Die Tryin' (2005). Built around a soul–influenced production sampling the Frankie Beverly and Maze song "I Need You", "Hustler's Ambition" features lyrics regarding 50 Cent's rise to fortune and fame, intended to mirror the experience faced by 50 Cent's character in the film: it marks a shift from influence of hardcore hip hop present in 50 Cent's earlier work. "Hustler's Ambition" was released to digital retailers in the United States in October 2005 via Interscope Records, with a CD release following in February 2006. The song was later included as a United Kingdom bonus track for the rapper's third studio album, Curtis (2007).

The song received generally favorable reviews from music critics, many of whom complimented the soulful production and 50 Cent's delivery. Some also found the song to be more musically diverse than the music 50 Cent recorded at the beginning of his career. The song achieved commercial success on a number of music charts, reaching the top 25 of charts across Europe and Australasia, although it only reached number 65 on the US Billboard Hot 100, making it one of 50 Cent's least successful songs in the country. A music video for "Hustler's Ambition" was directed by Anthony Mandler, and shows 50 Cent performing the song inside a warehouse whilst preparing for a boxing match.

== Background and recording ==
In late 2003, following the commercial success achieved by 50 Cent's debut studio album Get Rich or Die Tryin', Interscope Records head Jimmy Iovine asserted that 50 Cent had a high enough profile to move into making films. Plans for a film were revealed the following year, when 50 Cent revealed that he would be writing and directing his first motion picture, a semi-autobiographical work based on his difficult childhood experiences, with the Oscar-nominated director Jim Sheridan assisting in the production of the film. The film was originally known under the title Locked and Loaded, although this later became Get Rich or Die Tryin'. Get Rich or Die Tryin' was released to cinemas in 2005, and received generally mixed reviews from contemporary film critics.

50 Cent wrote the whole of "Hustler's Ambition" during a break from filming Get Rich or Die Tryin' in his trailer on the set of the film. The song's title was to match that of the film, which had the working title of Hustler's Ambition at the time; however, the film's title was ultimately changed to avoid confusion with the soon-to-be-released Hustle & Flow, as actor Terrence Howard had prominent roles in both films. American soul singer Frankie Beverly is also credited as having written "Hustler's Ambition", as a sample of his song "I Need You" – a collaboration with funk group Maze from their 1978 album Golden Time of Day – is included in the song's introduction. The production for "Hustler's Ambition" was provided by record producer Brian Hughes under his production name B-Money "B$", with recording carried out by Ky Miller at G-Unit Studios – a recording studio in New York City. The song's mixing process was carried out by Pat Viala, with mastering handled by Brian "Big Bass" Gardner.

== Composition and lyrics ==
"50 Cent - Hustler's Ambition"
A 21-second sample of "Hustler's Ambition", which covers the end of 50 Cent's first verse and the chorus: his lyrics detail the struggles that poverty brings, and how to act in order to survive, backed by a soulful production.

"Hustler's Ambition" is a hip hop song of three minutes and fifty-seven seconds in length. After opening with a sample of the Frankie Beverly and Maze song "I Need You", the instrumentation provided by B-Money "B$ "is built around a "solid bassline", and features background vocals that harmonize with 50 Cent's voice. As with much of the material from earlier in 50 Cent's career, the song follows a rags to riches theme of "getting rich or dying trying", according to Azeem Ahmad of musicOMH. 50 Cent's lyrics muse "exactly how far he wants to go" in the entertainment business following his rapid rise to fame over the preceding two years, as well as his believed superiority to other contemporary artists: "Look at me, this is the life I chose / Niggaz around me so cold, man my heart done froze... I'm just triple beam, dreamin / niggaz be, schemin". Writing for The Michigan Daily, Andrew Kahn noted the "old-school, pre-fame hunger" present in "Hustler's Ambition" due to the use of the "I Need You" sample. Steve Juon of RapReviews commented on 50 Cent's enunciation on the song, observing how the background vocals "never distract from 50's words" and that his "skills as an orator helped him rise to his current station in life".

== Reception ==
"Hustler's Ambition" received generally favourable reviews from music critics. David Jeffries of AllMusic called the song "a clever number" and compared it to the material found on 50 Cent's debut album, Get Rich or Die Tryin', commenting that it "recall[s] the looser moments of his debut". Although Azeem Ahmad noted "Hustler's Ambition" to be more musically diverse that 50 Cent's previous work in his review of the song for musicOMH, he also wrote that "it's hardly inspiring to those expecting a slice of raw hip-hop", although he concluded that the song sounded better after repeated listenings and that 50 Cent had "once again hit the jackpot". Andrew Kahn of The Michigan Daily felt the song to be "by far [his] best solo song on the album", and also wrote that it sounded "superior to most of The Massacre's tracks". In his review for the Get Rich or Die Tryin' soundtrack for PopMatters, Mike Schiller observed that "Hustler's Ambition" effectively represents the struggles that 50 Cent's character faces in the corresponding film, pointing out that it emphasizes his "hunger for money" and also noted the song to be a "subtle shift in perspective" of 50 Cent's music, in that it had moved from "club bangers that serve no particular purpose other than to get people dancing" to "raps... spit through the voice of a fictionalized version of his own younger self".

== Chart performance ==
Despite being released in the wake of several commercially prosperous singles from 50 Cent's preceding studio album, The Massacre (2005), including "Candy Shop" and "Just a Lil Bit", "Hustler's Ambition" did not match the chart success of previous 50 Cent singles. In the United States, the song first appeared at number 4 on the US Bubbling Under R&B/Hip-Hop Singles chart for the week ending October 22, 2005, and debuted at number 22 on the US Bubbling Under Hot 100 Singles chart the following week. It debuted at number 73 on the US Billboard Hot 100 for the chart dated November 5, 2005, and went on to peak at number 65, making it 50 Cent's second lowest peaking song at the time, behind only the 2004 single "If I Can't", which reached number 76. It also reached a peak of number 64 on the US Hot R&B/Hip-Hop Songs chart, and number 49 on the now-defunct US Pop 100 chart.

Outside the United States, "Hustler's Ambition" was also modestly commercially successful, although it achieved little longevity on the charts. It debuted and peaked at number 23 in Australia for the week dated March 5, 2006, charting for a total of seven weeks, and appeared at number 17 in New Zealand on March 20 in its first of five chart appearances. The song made appearances on several singles charts in mainland Europe, peaking at number 41 in Austria, number 22 in Germany and number 40 in The Netherlands. The song's highest peak position was achieved in Switzerland, where it debuted and reached its peak of number 10, and charted at number 39 in the Flanders region of Belgium and number 25 in the Wallonia region. In the British Isles, "Hustler's Ambition" reached number 11 in Ireland and peaked at number 13 in the United Kingdom.

== Music video ==
A music video for "Hustler's Ambition" was directed by Anthony Mandler, and is of four minutes and 54 seconds in length. It opens with an off-camera monologue from 50 Cent, explaining the hardships often faced by those in poorer communities, whilst – on-camera this time – he enters a warehouse, passing two men as he arrives, containing several pieces of recording equipment. Shots of 50 Cent travelling around the warehouse are then interspersed with those of him performing "Hustler's Ambition" into a microphone: after arriving in one room, he is shown to be repeatedly hitting a punching bag and lifting weights, as he trains for an upcoming boxing match.

Other members of G-Unit Records, including singer Olivia, are then shown to be present in the warehouse as 50 Cent continues to perform the song. Arriving at another boxing match and watching it from a balcony, 50 Cent recognizes a member of the crowd as one of the men he saw outside the warehouse: he then leaves the warehouse, with the video concluding with the fight ending and 50 Cent facing the camera on the street outside the warehouse.

The music video on YouTube has received over 90 million views as of April 2024.

== Track listing ==
- Digital download (United States)
1. "Hustler's Ambition" – 3:58
2. "Hustler's Ambition" (Clean Version) – 3:58
- CD single (Germany)
1. "Hustler's Ambition" – 3:58
2. "In da Club" (Live Glasgow Version) – 3:06
3. "P.I.M.P." (Live Glasgow Version) – 2:42
4. "Hustler's Ambition" (UK Edit Version) (Video) – 4:55

== Credits and personnel ==
The credits for "Hustler's Ambition" are adapted from the liner notes of the soundtrack to Get Rich or Die Tryin'.

Recording

- Recorded at G-Unit Studios, New York City.

Personnel

- 50 Cent – songwriting, vocals
- B-Money "B$" – songwriting, production
- Frankie Beverly – songwriting
- Ky Miller – recording
- Pat Viala – mixing
- Brian "Big Bass" Gardner – mastering

Samples

- Contains a sample of "I Need You", as written by Frankie Beverly and performed by Frankie Beverly & Maze.

== Charts ==
=== Weekly charts ===
Chart (2005–06)	Peak position
Australia (ARIA)	23
Austria (Ö3 Austria Top 40)	41
Belgium (Ultratop 50 Flanders)	39
Belgium (Ultratop 50 Wallonia)	25
Germany (GfK)	22
Greece (IFPI)	13
Ireland (IRMA)	11
Netherlands (Dutch Top 40 Tipparade)	3
Netherlands (Single Top 100)	40
New Zealand (Recorded Music NZ)	17
Scottish Singles Sales (Official Charts)	16
Switzerland (Schweizer Hitparade)	10
UK Singles (Official Charts)	13
UK Hip Hop/R&B (Official Charts)	4
US Billboard Hot 100	65
US Hot R&B/Hip-Hop Songs (Billboard)	64
US Pop 100 (Billboard)	49

== Certifications ==
Region	Certification	Certified units/sales
New Zealand (RMNZ)	Platinum	30,000^{‡}
United Kingdom (BPI)	Gold	400,000^{‡}
United States (RIAA)	Gold	500,000^{‡}
^{‡} Sales+streaming figures based on certification alone.

== Release history ==
Country	Date	Format	Label
United States	October 11, 2005	Digital download	Interscope Records
United Kingdom	January 27, 2006	Digital download	Interscope Records
United Kingdom	January 30, 2006	CD single	Interscope Records
United Kingdom	January 30, 2006	Vinyl single	Interscope Records
United States	February 7, 2006	CD single	Interscope Records
Germany	February 10, 2006	CD single	Interscope Records
