= Window Shopper =

Single by 50 Cent

from the album Get Rich or Die Tryin': Music from and Inspired by the Motion Picture and The Massacre (Special Edition)
- Released: November 6, 2005
- Recorded: 2005
- Genre: Hip hop; gangsta rap
- Length: 3:13
- Label: G-Unit; Interscope
- Songwriters: Curtis Jackson; Teraike Crawford; Jason Horace Turnbull; Robert Nesta Marley
- Producers: C. Styles; Sire

50 Cent singles chronology
"I Know You Don't Love Me" (2005)	"Window Shopper" (2005)	"Best Friend" (2006)

Audio sample
- file; help

"Window Shopper" is a single by rapper 50 Cent. It was released in November 2005 as the second single (in the U.S.) and first single (in the UK and Australia) from the Get Rich or Die Tryin' soundtrack released in 2005, as well as the film's theme song. It was later included on his 2005 album, The Massacre as a bonus track. It peaked at number 20 on the Billboard Hot 100, and had slightly more success in a couple of other countries. The song was certified Gold by the RIAA.

== Music video ==
The music video is set in Monaco and Cannes. It's about how 50 Cent and friends are rich enough to buy overpriced items, such as $400 cheeseburgers, and a $1,500,000 Maserati MC12. It received a nomination at the 2006 MTV Video Music Awards for Best Rap Video. There are two versions of the video: one which contains several clips from the film and one that doesn't and is the full version of the video. For example, the video either starts with footage from the film of Marcus looking through a window at shoes, or it starts with 50 Cent and Mase trying to understand what a French shoe salesman is saying. The video features cameo appearances by other G-Unit members, M.O.P., Ma$e, Mobb Deep and Olivia.

The music video on YouTube has received over 250 million views as of March 2024.

== Charts ==
=== Weekly charts ===
Chart (2005–06)	Peak position
Australia (ARIA)	13
Australian Urban (ARIA)	4
Austria (Ö3 Austria Top 40)	26
Belgium (Ultratop 50 Flanders)	20
Belgium (Ultratop 50 Wallonia)	19
Czech Republic Airplay (ČNS IFPI)	29
France (SNEP)	23
Germany (GfK)	20
Ireland (IRMA)	6
Netherlands (Dutch Top 40)	37
Netherlands (Single Top 100)	38
New Zealand (Recorded Music NZ)	8
Norway (VG-lista)	8
Scottish Singles Sales (Official Charts)	12
Switzerland (Schweizer Hitparade)	7
UK Singles (Official Charts)	11
UK Hip Hop/R&B (Official Charts)	2
US Billboard Hot 100	20
US Hot R&B/Hip-Hop Songs (Billboard)	14
US Hot Rap Songs (Billboard)	9
US Pop 100 (Billboard)	41
US Rhythmic Airplay (Billboard)	21

=== Year-end charts ===
Chart (2005)	Position
UK Singles (OCC)	190
UK Urban (Music Week) "Window Shopper" / "Hustler's Ambition"	29

Chart (2006)	Position
Australia (ARIA)	80
Germany (Media Control GfK)	94
Switzerland (Schweizer Hitparade)	62

== Certifications ==
Certifications for "Window Shopper"
Region	Certification	Certified units/sales
Brazil (Pro-Música Brasil)	Gold	30,000^{‡}
Denmark (IFPI Danmark)	Gold	45,000^{‡}
New Zealand (RMNZ)	2× Platinum	60,000^{‡}
United Kingdom (BPI)	Platinum	600,000^{‡}
United States (RIAA)	Platinum	1,000,000^{‡}
United States (RIAA) Mastertone	Gold	500,000^{*}
^{*} Sales figures based on certification alone.^{‡} Sales+streaming figures based on certification alone.

== Release history ==
Release dates and formats for "Window Shopper"
Region	Date	Format	Label(s)	Ref.
United States	October 18, 2005	Mainstream airplay	G-Unit; Interscope	
