= Just a Lil Bit =

2005 single by 50 Cent

Single by 50 Cent

from the album The Massacre
- Released: May 17, 2005
- Length: 3:57
- Label: Shady; Aftermath; Interscope; Universal
- Songwriters: Curtis Jackson; Scott Storch
- Producer: Scott Storch

50 Cent singles chronology
"MJB da MVP" (2005)	"Just a Lil Bit" (2005)	"Outta Control" (2005)

Music video
- "Just a Lil Bit" on YouTube

"Just a Lil Bit" is the third single from 50 Cent's second album, The Massacre. The song was produced by Scott Storch. Released on May 17, 2005, the single reached number three in the United States, becoming 50 Cent's sixth solo top-ten single, and ninth overall. It also reached number ten in the United Kingdom. The B-side is a live recording of "Disco Inferno" for AOL Sessions.

== Background ==
"Just a Lil Bit" debuted at number 69 on the Billboard Hot 100 and peaked at number three on the chart. The song was eventually certified Platinum by the RIAA. The official remix features rapper White Dawg. T-Pain used the instrumental to do a freestyle called "A Little Hit". Game also used the instrumental on his song "300 Bars & Runnin'", in which he disses 50 Cent and other members of G-Unit. He also redid "Just a Lil Bit" as a diss to 50 Cent.

== Music video ==
The music video is set in Cancún, Mexico, and follows a thin plot where 50 Cent, as "El Jefe" ("The Boss"), employs three beautiful women to set up his enemies, played by Emilio Rivera, Hassan Johnson and Jesús Ochoa. 50 Cent leaves each enemy $50. The video also contains cameos by some G-Unit artists. The music video on YouTube has received over 636 million views as of January 2026.

== CD cover ==
The artwork for the CD cover shows 50 Cent's modern adaptation of the rap squat that includes the prayer pose.

== Track listing ==
- UK CD single 1
1. "Just a Lil Bit" - 3:59
2. "Disco Inferno" (Live AOL Session) - 3:11
- UK CD single 2
1. "Just a Lil Bit" - 3:59
2. "Just a Lil Bit" (Instrumental) - 3:59
3. "Just a Lil Bit" (Music Video) - 3:59
4. "Disco Inferno" (Live AOL Session - Music Video) - 3:11

== Charts ==
=== Weekly charts ===
Chart (2005)	Peak position
Australia (ARIA)	13
Australian Urban (ARIA)	9
Austria (Ö3 Austria Top 40)	13
Belgium (Ultratop 50 Flanders)	9
Belgium (Ultratop 50 Wallonia)	20
Canada CHR/Pop Top 30 (Radio & Records)	6
Europe (Eurochart Hot 100)	14
France (SNEP)	38
Germany (GfK)	11
Ireland (IRMA)	9
Netherlands (Dutch Top 40)	21
New Zealand (Recorded Music NZ)	8
Scottish Singles Sales (Official Charts)	10
Switzerland (Schweizer Hitparade)	11
UK Singles (Official Charts)	10
UK Hip Hop/R&B (Official Charts)	4
US Billboard Hot 100	3
US Hot R&B/Hip-Hop Songs (Billboard)	3
US Pop Airplay (Billboard)	9
US Hot Rap Songs (Billboard)	1

Chart (2022)	Peak position
Hungary (Single Top 40)	39

Chart (2025)	Peak position
Greece International (IFPI)	58

=== Year-end charts ===
Chart (2005)	Position
Australia (ARIA)	70
Belgium (Ultratop 50 Flanders)	62
Belgium (Ultratop 50 Wallonia)	70
Germany (Media Control GfK)	73
Netherlands (Dutch Top 40)	162
New Zealand (RIANZ)	44
Switzerland (Schweizer Hitparade)	63
UK Singles (OCC)	116
UK Urban (Music Week)	4
US Billboard Hot 100	17
US Hot R&B/Hip-Hop Songs (Billboard)	29

== Certifications ==
Region	Certification	Certified units/sales
Australia (ARIA)	Gold	35,000^{^}
Brazil (Pro-Música Brasil)	Platinum	60,000^{‡}
Denmark (IFPI Danmark)	Platinum	90,000^{‡}
Germany (BVMI)	Platinum	300,000^{‡}
Italy (FIMI)	Gold	50,000^{‡}
New Zealand (RMNZ)	4× Platinum	120,000^{‡}
Spain (Promusicae)	Gold	30,000^{‡}
United Kingdom (BPI)	Platinum	600,000^{‡}
United States (RIAA)	3× Platinum	3,000,000^{‡}
United States (RIAA) Mastertone	Platinum	1,000,000^{*}
Streaming
Greece (IFPI Greece)	2× Platinum	4,000,000^{†}
^{*} Sales figures based on certification alone.^{^} Shipments figures based on certification alone.^{‡} Sales+streaming figures based on certification alone.^{†} Streaming-only figures based on certification alone.
