= Outlaw (50 Cent song) =

Single by 50 Cent
- Released: July 19, 2011
- Recorded: 2010
- Genre: East Coast hip-hop; gangsta rap; hardcore hip-hop
- Length: 3:16
- Label: Shady; Aftermath; G-Unit; Interscope
- Songwriters: Curtis Jackson; Carl McCormick
- Producer: Cardiak

50 Cent singles chronology
"Right There" (2011)	"Outlaw" (2011)	"I Just Wanna" (2012)

"Outlaw" is a song by American hip-hop artist 50 Cent. The song features production from hip-hop producer Cardiak, and was officially released as a digital download on July 19, 2011.

== Background ==
The song was released after 50 Cent revealed on Twitter that he and his label were having creative differences and that his album would be on hold until both parties agreed. 50 Cent took matters into his own hands and released the song himself on his website Thisis50.com on June 16. Due to the quick success of the song, 50 Cent said on Twitter that the labels had agreed and that the song's success encouraged them to push the album.

== Chart performance ==
The song charted on the US Hot R&B/Hip-Hop Songs chart at number ninety-nine on the week ending July 23, 2011 on urban contemporary radio airplay only, prior to its digital release. It debuted on the Billboard Hot 100 at number 87 on the week ending August 6, 2011, after its first full week of digital sales.

== Chart positions ==
Chart (2011)	Peak position
Canada (Canadian Hot 100)	87
US Billboard Hot 100	87
US Hot R&B/Hip-Hop Songs (Billboard)	99

== Release history ==
Country	Date	Format	Label
United States	July 19, 2011	Digital download	Shady, Aftermath, Interscope
