= If I Can't =

Single by 50 Cent

from the album Get Rich or Die Tryin'
- A-side: "Poppin' Them Thangs"
- B-side: "In da Club"; "What Up Gangsta"
- Released: September 16, 2003
- Genre: Hip hop; gangsta rap
- Length: 3:16
- Label: Interscope; Shady; Aftermath; G-Unit
- Songwriters: Curtis Jackson; Andre Young; Mike Elizondo
- Producers: Dr. Dre; Mike Elizondo

50 Cent singles chronology
"P.I.M.P." (2003)	"If I Can't" (2003)	"On Fire" (2004)

"If I Can't" is a song recorded by American rapper 50 Cent for his debut studio album Get Rich or Die Tryin'. It is one of the album's four tracks produced by Dr. Dre, with co-production from Mike Elizondo. The song was released in Europe and Australia as the album's fourth and final single on September 16, 2003, through Interscope Records, Shady Records and Aftermath Entertainment.

With no physical single released in the US, the song failed to match the commercial success of its predecessors, peaking at number 76 on the US Billboard Hot 100 through radio play alone. However, it peaked at number ten in the United Kingdom through physical purchases, with a limited-edition version of the single being released as a double A-side along with G-Unit's "Poppin' Them Thangs".

== Background ==
"Before my album Get Rich or Die Tryin' came out, there was a big debate about what the first single should be. Jimmy Iovine thought it should be the one that Dr. Dre produced, 'If I Can't'. But Em wanted 'In da Club'. In the end they were deadlocked, so they asked me and I told them, real quiet, 'In da Club'." – 50 Cent

Released in 2003, it reached No. 76 in the US, becoming 50 Cent's sixth Hot 100 entry, but nonetheless his weakest charting single at that time. It also peaked at No. 10 in the UK as a double A-side with "Poppin' Them Thangs" (G-Unit). The song was written by 50 Cent, Dr. Dre, and Mike Elizondo, with production by Dr. Dre, and Mike Elizondo.

== Music video ==
At the start there is a white man introducing 50 Cent; it then consists of video footage of 50 Cent in different concerts and documentaries. All of the members of G-Unit are seen in the video. It is very similar to the music video to Eminem's 2003 single "Sing for the Moment".

== Track listing ==
- UK CD single
1. "If I Can't" - 3:16
2. "Poppin' Them Thangs" (with G-Unit) - 3:45
3. "In da Club" (Live in New York) - 4:52
4. "If I Can't" (Music Video) - 3:24
5. "Poppin' Them Things" (Music Video) - 3:48
- German CD single
1. "If I Can't" - 3:16
2. "Poppin' Them Things" (with G-Unit) - 3:45
- Australian CD single
1. "If I Can't" - 3:16
2. "In da Club" (Live in New York) - 4:52
3. "What Up Gangsta" (Live in New York) - 4:08
4. "If I Can't" (Instrumental) - 3:08

== Charts ==
=== Weekly charts ===
Weekly chart performance for "If I Can't"
Chart (2003–2004)	Peak position
Australia (ARIA)	22
Australian Urban (ARIA)	10
Austria (Ö3 Austria Top 40)	48
Belgium (Ultratop 50 Flanders)	24
Belgium (Ultratip Bubbling Under Wallonia)	5
Germany (GfK)	34
Hungary (Dance Top 40)	9
Hungary (Single Top 40)	6
Ireland (IRMA) with "Poppin' Them Thangs"	11
Italy (FIMI)	17
Netherlands (Dutch Top 40)	25
Netherlands (Single Top 100)	14
New Zealand (Recorded Music NZ)	26
Scottish Singles Sales (Official Charts) with "Poppin' Them Thangs"	12
Switzerland (Schweizer Hitparade)	18
UK Singles (Official Charts) with "Poppin' Them Thangs"	10
UK Hip Hop/R&B (Official Charts) with "Poppin' Them Thangs"	3
US Billboard Hot 100	76
US Hot R&B/Hip-Hop Songs (Billboard)	34
US Hot Rap Songs (Billboard)	22
US Rhythmic Airplay (Billboard)	16

=== Year-end charts ===
2003 year-end chart performance for "If I Can't"
Chart (2003)	Position
US Hot R&B/Hip-Hop Songs (Billboard)	93

2004 year-end chart performance for "If I Can't"
Chart (2004)	Position
Switzerland (Schweizer Hitparade)	100
UK Singles (OCC)	165

== Certifications ==
Certifications and sales for "If I Can't"
Region	Certification	Certified units/sales
Denmark (IFPI Danmark)	Gold	45,000^{‡}
Germany (BVMI)	Gold	150,000^{‡}
New Zealand (RMNZ)	2× Platinum	60,000^{‡}
United Kingdom (BPI) with "Poppin' Them Thangs"	Gold	400,000^{‡}
United States (RIAA)	Gold	500,000^{‡}
^{‡} Sales+streaming figures based on certification alone.

== Release history ==
Release dates and formats for "If I Can't"
Region	Date	Format(s)	Label(s)	Ref.
United States	September 16, 2003	Digital download	Interscope; Shady; Aftermath	
Australia	January 19, 2004	Maxi CD	Universal Music	
United Kingdom (Note: Across Europe, "If I Can't" was released as a double A-side single with "Poppin' Them Thangs".)	February 23, 2004	12-inch vinyl; maxi CD	Polydor	
Germany	March 15, 2004	Maxi CD	Universal Music	
