= Get Rich or Die Tryin' (soundtrack) =

Get Rich or Die Tryin': Music from and Inspired by the Motion Picture

Soundtrack album by G-Unit Records
- Released: November 8, 2005
- Genres: Hip hop; hardcore hip hop; gangsta rap
- Length: 65:05
- Labels: Interscope; G-Unit
- Producers: All-Star; Black Jeruz; Joanne B-Money "B$"; C. Styles; Che Vicious; DJ Khalil; Dr. Dre; Fredwreck; Havoc; Hi-Tek; Jake One; J.R. Rotem; K.O.; Kickdrums Productions; Mike Elizondo; Nick Speed; Recognize Reel; Ron Browz; Sha Money XL; Sire; The Outfit

Singles from Get Rich or Die Tryin': Music from and Inspired by the Motion Picture
- 1. "Hustler's Ambition" Released: August 9, 2005; 2. "Window Shopper" Released: November 6, 2005; 3. "Best Friend" Released: January 19, 2006; 4. "Have a Party" Released: March 2, 2006; 5. "I'll Whip Ya Head Boy" Released: May 24, 2006

Professional ratings
Review scores
Source	Rating
AllMusic	3/5 stars
Entertainment Weekly	
HipHopDX	3/5 stars
PopMatters	(6/10)
RapReviews	(7.5/10)
Rolling Stone	3.5/5 stars

Get Rich or Die Tryin': Music from and Inspired by the Motion Picture is the soundtrack to the 2005 film of the same name, released on November 8, 2005, on Interscope Records and 50 Cent's G-Unit Records. It features artists on the G-Unit label such as 50 Cent (who also executive produced the album), Lloyd Banks, Young Buck, Tony Yayo, Olivia, and Mobb Deep. The album sold 320,000 copies in the first week, debuting behind country singer Kenny Chesney's The Road and the Radio. In December 2005, the RIAA certified the album platinum. To date, the album has sold over three million copies worldwide.

== Singles ==
- "Hustler's Ambition" was released as the album's lead single on August 9, 2005. The single is Jackson's personal favourite. The single peaked at #65 on Billboard Hot 100. The song is about Jacksons' rough time growing up and how he had to hustle to keep up with life.
- "Window Shopper" was released as the album's second single on November 6, 2005, and serves as the film's theme song. The single peaked at #20 on the Hot 100. The single's version has a slightly different chorus, in which Jackson claims that Ja Rule, Jadakiss, Nas and Fat Joe are window shoppers, as he was feuding with these rappers at the time.
- "Best Friend" was released as the album's third single on January 19, 2006. The single version features Olivia. The single peaked #35 on the Hot 100. The song is used throughout the film as a way for Marcus, Jackson's character, to lyrically flirt with Charlene, his love interest.
- "Have a Party" was released as the album's fourth single on March 2, 2006. The song features Mobb Deep and Nate Dogg. The single peaked at #105 on the Hot 100, and was the worst performing single from the album. It also the least heard song from the album, only appearing in a very short segment when Marcus was in prison.
- "I'll Whip Ya Head Boy" was released as the fifth and final single from the album on May 24, 2006. The song features Young Buck, and the single version also includes M.O.P. The single peaked at #74 on the Hot 100, becoming the second worst performing single from the album. A number of remixes were also released.

== Track listing ==
Credits adapted from the album's liner notes.

No.	Title	Writer(s)	Producer(s)	Length
1.	"Hustler's Ambition" (50 Cent)	Curtis Jackson; Brian Hughes; Frankie Beverly	B-Money "B$"	3:57
2.	"What If" (50 Cent)	Jackson; Nick Speed; Michael Clervoix; Bobby Womack; Darryl Carter; Linda Cooke	Nick Speed	3:05
3.	"Things Change" (Spider Loc featuring 50 Cent & Lloyd Banks)	Jackson; Curtis Williams; Christopher Lloyd; Clervoix; Rashad Smith; Derick Prosper	Black Jerz; Sha Money XL	3:59
4.	"You Already Know" (Lloyd Banks featuring 50 Cent & Young Buck)	Jackson; Lloyd; David Brown; Jonathan Williams; Peterson Dennis	The Outfit	4:15
5.	"When Death Becomes You" (M.O.P. featuring 50 Cent)	Jackson; Eric Murray; Jamal Grinnage; Matt Penttilla; Alexander Fitts; Brian Holland; Lamont Dozier; Eddie Holland, Jr.	The Kickdrums	3:05
6.	"Have a Party" (Mobb Deep featuring 50 Cent & Nate Dogg)	Jackson; Albert Johnson; Kejuan Muchita; Nathaniel Hale; Farid Nassar	Fredwreck	3:55
7.	"We Both Think Alike" (50 Cent featuring Olivia)	Jackson; Lorina Williams; Khalil Abdul-Rahman	DJ Khalil	3:05
8.	"Don't Need No Help" (Young Buck)	Brown; Tony Cottrell; Jonathan Rotem	Hi-Tek; Jonathan "J.R." Rotem	2:50
9.	"Get Low" (Lloyd Banks)	Lloyd; Allen Gordon; Joel Campbell	Allstar "The Big Beat Maker"	3:56
10.	"Fake Love" (Tony Yayo)	Marvin Bernard; Karreem Denis; Roy Ayers	K.O.	3:20
11.	"Window Shopper" (50 Cent)	Jackson; Teraike Crawford; Jason Horace Turnbull; Bob Marley	C. Styles; Sire	3:10
12.	"Born Alone, Die Alone" (Lloyd Banks)	Lloyd; Muchita; Raeford Gerald	Havoc	3:00
13.	"You a Shooter" (Mobb Deep featuring 50 Cent)	Clervoix; Jackson; Johnson; Muchita	Sha Money XL	3:05
14.	"I Don't Know Officer" (50 Cent featuring Lloyd Banks, Prodigy, Spider Loc & Ma$e)	Jacob Dutton; Jackson; Lloyd; Johnson; C. Williams; Mason Betha	Jake One	4:32
15.	"Talk About Me" (50 Cent)	Jackson; Andre Young; Mike Elizondo; Che Pope; Mark Batson	Dr. Dre; Mike Elizondo; Che Vicious (add.)	3:41
16.	"When It Rains It Pours" (50 Cent)	Jackson; Young; Pope; Elizondo	Dr. Dre; Che Vicious; Mike Elizondo	4:02

Bonus Tracks
No.	Title	Writer(s)	Producer(s)	Length
17.	"Best Friend" (50 Cent)	Jackson; Cottrell; Rotem; Jo Armstead; Nickolas Ashford; Valerie Simpson	Hi-Tek	4:11
18.	"I'll Whip Ya Head Boy" (50 Cent featuring Young Buck)	Jackson; Brown; Rondell Turner	Ron Browz	3:56

UK & Japan Bonus Tracks
No.	Title	Producer(s)	Length
17.	"Cloud 9" (50 Cent & Olivia)	DJ Khalil	4:35
18.	"Best Friend" (50 Cent)	Hi-Tek	4:11
19.	"I'll Whip Ya Head Boy" (50 Cent & Young Buck)	Ron Browz	3:56

Sample credits

- "Hustler's Ambition" contains elements from "I Need You" (Beverly), performed by Frankie Beverly & Maze.
- "What If" contains elements from "Woman's Gotta Have It" (Womack/Carter/Cooke), performed by Bobby Womack.
- "When Death Becomes You" contains elements from "You're Gone But Always In My Heart" (Holland/Dozier/Holland), performed by The Supremes.
- "Fake Love" contains elements from "Everybody Loves the Sunshine" (Ayers), written and performed by Roy Ayers.
- "Window Shopper" contains elements from "Burnin' and Lootin'" (Marley), performed by Bob Marley.
- "Born Alone, Die Alone" contains elements from "Friends or Lovers" (Gerald), performed by Act One.
- "Best Friend" contains elements from "Silly, Wasn't I" (Armstead/Ashford/Simpson), performed by Valerie Simpson.

== Charts ==
=== Weekly charts ===
Chart (2005–2006)	Peak position
Australian Albums (ARIA)	22
Austrian Albums (Ö3 Austria)	39
Belgian Albums (Ultratop Flanders)	50
Belgian Albums (Ultratop Wallonia)	48
Canadian Albums (Billboard)	2
Dutch Albums (Album Top 100)	54
French Albums (SNEP)	35
German Albums (Offizielle Top 100)	15
New Zealand Albums (RMNZ)	19
Scottish Albums (Official Charts)	21
UK Albums (Official Charts)	18
US Billboard 200	2
US Top R&B/Hip-Hop Albums (Billboard)	1
US Soundtrack Albums (Billboard)	1

=== Year-end charts ===
Chart (2005)	Position
UK Albums (OCC)	146
US Top R&B/Hip-Hop Albums (Billboard)	84
Worldwide Albums (IFPI)	31
Chart (2006)	Position
US Billboard 200	50
US Top R&B/Hip-Hop Albums (Billboard)	17
US Soundtrack Albums (Billboard)	3

== Certifications ==
Region	Certification	Certified units/sales
Italy (FIMI)	2× Platinum	100,000^{‡}
New Zealand (RMNZ)	2× Platinum	30,000^{‡}
United Kingdom (BPI)	Gold	100,000^{^}
United States (RIAA)	Platinum	1,000,000^{^}
^{^} Shipments figures based on certification alone.^{‡} Sales+streaming figures based on certification alone.
