= Outta Control (50 Cent song) =

2005 single by 50 Cent featuring Mobb Deep

"Outta Control (Remix)"

Single by 50 Cent featuring Mobb Deep

from the album The Massacre (Special Edition) and Blood Money (Bonus Track Version)
- Released: September 27, 2005
- Recorded: 2004
- Genre: Gangsta rap
- Length: 3:21
- Label: G-Unit; Shady; Aftermath; Interscope; Universal
- Songwriters: Curtis Jackson; Andre Young; Mike Elizondo; Albert Johnson; Kejuan Muchita; Mark Batson; Chris Pope; Steven Standard
- Producers: Dr. Dre; Elizondo

50 Cent singles chronology
"So Seductive" (2005)	"Outta Control (Remix)" (2005)	"Hustler's Ambition" (2005)

Mobb Deep singles chronology
"Throw Ya Hands (In the Air)" (2004)	"Outta Control (Remix)" (2005)	"Have a Party" (2006)

"Outta Control" is a song by American rapper 50 Cent, recorded for his second studio album, The Massacre (2005). The song was produced by Dr. Dre and Mike Elizondo. A remixed version of the song was released as the fourth and final single from The Massacre, although it is only included on the re-released version and replaces the original version. The remix is also produced by Dr. Dre and Elizondo and features a guest appearance from hip-hop group Mobb Deep. It also appears as a bonus track on Mobb Deep's seventh studio album Blood Money (2006).

Both versions of the song have "heavy" drum-based productions and also incorporate elements of strings throughout, although the remix is produced more sparsely than the original and also prominently features piano keys throughout. Lyrically, the songs are both largely about 50 Cent's ability to control the attitudes of people during his performances in clubs, describing how he has them "going outta control".

Due to confusion over which version of the song would be released as a single, both versions of the song charted on the Billboard Hot 100. Though the original peaked at number 92 (digital sales alone), the remix was a significant success, peaking at number 6 on the Billboard Hot 100 and charting highly worldwide.

In a list of the 40 greatest songs produced by Dr. Dre, Rolling Stone ranked “Outta Control (Remix)” at number 36, writing that the track “has the untroubled panache of a man at the peak of his powers,” and praising 50 Cent's “effortlessly made ear candy” hook. The magazine also highlighted the performances of Havoc and Prodigy, as well as Dr. Dre and Mike Elizondo's production, noting their “sparsely effective interplay of halting piano keys, skidding strings, and Dre’s patented bass-drum thumps,” which helped make the song “easy to love, but hard to reproduce.”

== Background ==
The song was written by 50 Cent, Dr. Dre, Mike Elizondo, Prodigy, Havoc, Mark Batson, Chris Pope and Steve Standard, and produced by Dr. Dre and Mike Elizondo. It was originally released as "Outta Control" on the original version of The Massacre. This version was a completely different song, simply with the same title. However, when the album was set for re-release, the song became earmarked as the album's next single and was remade as "Outta Control Remix". The remix not only features Mobb Deep, but utilizes a different sample. However, no advanced single was released for "Outta Control Remix". This led to confusion among digital consumers who downloaded the original version of "Outta Control", causing it to chart concurrently with "Outta Control (Remix)". The original version thus charted at #92 on the U.S. Billboard Hot 100, while the remix charted at #6, becoming 50 Cent's seventh top-ten solo single on the chart as the lead artist. It also marked his tenth top-ten single overall.

The remix instrumental was offered to Shady Records rapper Stat Quo after 50 Cent initially chose not to include the song on The Massacre; however, after Stat Quo had recorded vocals to it, he was informed that 50 Cent had decided to take the song back and offer it to Mobb Deep instead. Despite his initial disappointment, Stat Quo would later reflect in an interview with HipHopDX that he understood the decision, suggesting that 50 Cent was simply acting in the interest of his label's artists.

== Music video ==
The shirts worn by some of the rappers in the music video have the words "GAME OVER" on them, symbolising The Game's departure from G-Unit. The video takes place in a club where 50 Cent & Mobb Deep have a phone call to decide where to meet. The video has cameos from G-Unit artists M.O.P, Tony Yayo, Olivia, Lloyd Banks, Spider Loc and Young Buck, as well as The Alchemist and Winky Wright.

The music video on YouTube has received over 185 million views as of April 2024.

== Track listing ==
- UK CD single #1
1. "Outta Control" (remix featuring Mobb Deep)
2. "Outta Control" (album version)
- UK CD single #2
1. "Outta Control" (remix featuring Mobb Deep)
2. "Outta Control" (album instrumental)
3. "Outta Control" (remix instrumental)
4. "Outta Control" (music video)

== Chart performance ==
Released in 2005, the single peaked at #6 in the U.S., where it became 50 Cent's seventh solo top-ten single and tenth overall. It also reached #7 in the UK and #6 in Canada. The original version, despite not being released as a single, peaked at #92 on the U.S. Billboard Hot 100.

== Charts ==
=== Weekly charts ===
==== Original version ====
Chart (2005)	Peak position
US Billboard Hot 100	92
US Pop 100 (Billboard)	54

==== Remix featuring Mobb Deep ====
Chart (2005)	Peak position
Australia (ARIA)	16
Australian Urban (ARIA)	6
Austria (Ö3 Austria Top 40)	18
Belgium (Ultratop 50 Flanders)	10
Belgium (Ultratop 50 Wallonia)	22
Canada (Canadian Singles Chart)	6
Germany (GfK)	8
Greece (IFPI)	12
Ireland (IRMA)	5
Netherlands (Dutch Top 40)	27
Netherlands (Single Top 100)	21
Scottish Singles Sales (Official Charts)	13
Switzerland (Schweizer Hitparade)	10
UK Singles (The Official Charts Company)	7
UK Hip Hop/R&B (Official Charts)	2
US Billboard Hot 100	6
US Hot R&B/Hip-Hop Songs (Billboard)	11
US Pop 100 (Billboard)	15
US Rap Songs (Billboard)	5

=== Year-end charts ===
Chart (2005)	Position
Germany (Media Control GfK)	83
Netherlands (Dutch Top 40)	181
Switzerland (Schweizer Hitparade)	68
UK Singles (OCC)	95
UK Urban (Music Week)	15
US Billboard Hot 100	78
US Hot R&B/Hip-Hop Songs (Billboard)	88

== Certifications ==
Region	Certification	Certified units/sales
Brazil (Pro-Música Brasil)	Gold	30,000^{‡}
New Zealand (RMNZ)	2× Platinum	60,000^{‡}
United Kingdom (BPI) Mobb Deep remix	Gold	400,000^{‡}
United States (RIAA)	Platinum	1,000,000^{‡}
^{‡} Sales+streaming figures based on certification alone.
