= Street King Immortal =

Unreleased album by 50 Cent

Studio album by 50 Cent
- Labels: G-Unit; Caroline
- Producers: Dr. Dre; Swizz Beatz; 45 Music; Symbolyc One; Soul Professa; Davaughn

50 Cent chronology
Best of 50 Cent (2017)	Street King Immortal (cancelled)

Street King Immortal is a scrapped studio album by American rapper 50 Cent, originally meant to be his sixth album.

Initially reported to be released during the summer of 2011, the release date of Street King Immortal has since been revised on several occasions. Officially announced release dates of November 13, 2012; February 26, 2013; and August 18, 2016, were set in the past. In July 2017, 50 Cent stated that the album would be released at the end of the year though this did not occur. 50 Cent said in an Instagram post that "Still Think I'm Nothing" was the first single off of Street King Immortal. After nearly a decade in development hell, 50 Cent officially cancelled the project in July 2021.

== Background ==
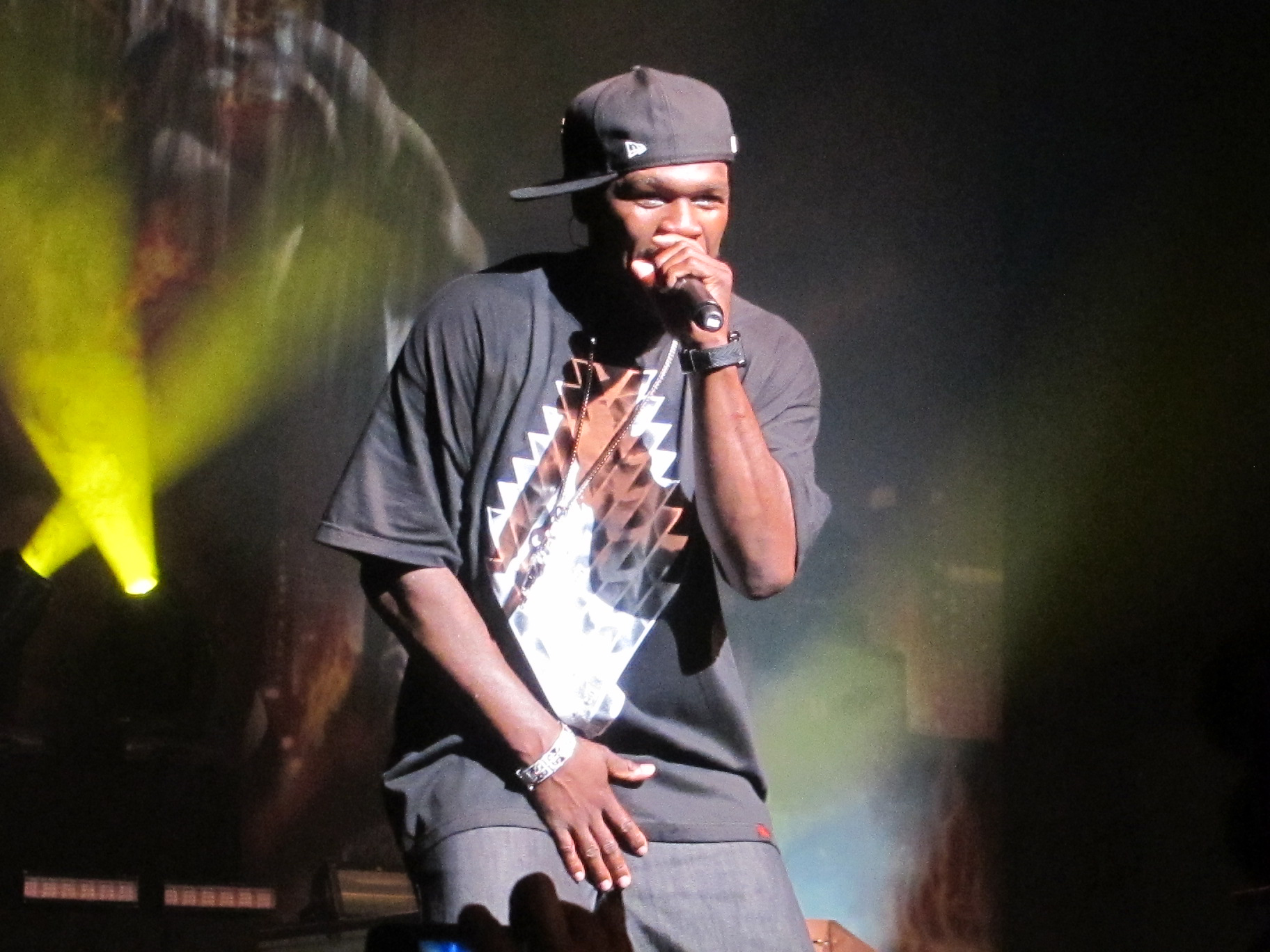
50 Cent performing on The Invitation Tour in 2010.

Originally, 50 Cent's fifth studio album was set to be Black Magic, an album influenced by several genres including rock and dance music. However, its release was postponed as 50 Cent began to write more material based on a different concept. As a result, recording sessions for a brand new album began from scratch, and material recorded for Street King Immortal is reportedly of a traditional hip hop nature, involving producers such as Alex da Kid, Bangladesh, Cardiak, Dr. Dre, Hit-Boy, Jake One, Jim Jonsin, and Just Blaze among others. It was later reported that the album would be titled 5 (Murder by Numbers), and would be released on July 3, 2012. 50 Cent instead decided to make 5 (Murder by Numbers) a separate album, to be released as a free download on July 6, 2012, and release a new collection of material as his sixth studio album, titled Street King Immortal:

I got a chance to hear the music that was playing out there prior to me coming there. It's almost like when I come into the territory they change the music to 50 Cent music, so I'm saying, 'What were you playing before I got here?' And this music was all fast, the tempo and production, it was just different.

— 50 Cent, speaking on Black Magic's influences of dance music.

In November 2009, 50 Cent released his fourth studio album, titled Before I Self Destruct. The album did not match the previous commercial success of his first three studio albums, only selling 180,000 copies in its first week of release in the United States, peaking at number three on the Billboard 200. To help promote the album, 50 Cent went on The Invitation Tour; while on the European leg of the tour, he visited nightclubs and was impressed with the vastly changing styles of music played. Because of this, 50 Cent began to write and record material for an album called Black Magic while still on tour. This new album's music would be influenced by number of genres, including dance, rock and pop music; it would have a "higher tempo" than his previous work, although he claimed that the predominant genre of the music would still be hip hop.

However, 50 Cent later revealed to the Brazilian edition of music magazine Rolling Stone that he was unsure whether to continue with the recording of the album, which he had begun while in the European venues of the tour, as he had begun to write material that he claimed "didn't quite fit the concept" of the album. He later revealed the release of Black Magic had been postponed indefinitely, although he stated the album may be released in the future. Street King Immortal will be more hip hop-influenced than the material recorded for Black Magic, which was inspired and influenced by a number of genres. In an interview with The Hollywood Reporter, 50 Cent announced that he would never release the album Black Magic, as it no longer makes sense to do so:

It doesn't make sense – and that's why you're never going to hear that album. I have things that I really appreciate that belong in my iPod – my iPod only – and leave it there.

In an interview with MTV, 50 Cent discouraged fans from comparing Street King Immortal to his debut studio album Get Rich or Die Tryin'. In the same interview, 50 Cent revealed the album's release date and said it would not be changed again, as it will serve as a commemoration of the tenth anniversary of Get Rich or Die Tryin':

Hold me to the greater quality. Don't hold me to the exact content, don't hold me to the production, don't play both albums next to each other and say, 'Which track do I like better?' Just listen to the actual project itself and you'll see the growth and how I'm seasoned. I'm 10 years in now. I'm not under any circumstances in a position that I'm not comfortable or able to function in any area of entertainment at this point.

50 Cent confirmed in an interview with British hip-hop music television channel Flava, aired on January 3, 2012, that he had recorded seventy songs for the album, and only fourteen would make the final cut. In early January 2013 Street King Immortal was included on multiple "Most Anticipated albums of 2013" lists including E!, MTV and being eleventh on a list by XXL Magazine. On January 25, 2013, 50 Cent announced that he is still recording material for the album in an interview with Fuse.

In January 2014, 50 Cent said he plans on a releasing a project called Animal Ambition in the first quarter of 2014 before the album comes out. He wanted to release the project as his "viral marketing plan" in order to hype up Street King Immortal. However a month later it was announced that the Animal Ambition LP would instead be released on June 3, 2014. In June 2014, 50 Cent announced the album would be released on September 16, 2014.

=== Cancellation ===
In July 2021, 50 Cent confirmed in an interview with The Independent that the album will not be released and that he had decided to scrap the project, stating "That original version is not being released, but I’m releasing new music in September". Although he aimed to release new music in September 2021, this did not occur.

== Development ==
=== Recording and production ===
In November 2010, in an interview with MTV News, Surf Club producers Hit-Boy and Chase N. Cashe revealed that they had contributed production work for Street King Immortal. Hit-Boy revealed that they had visited 50 Cent to play him a selection of their productions and hear "where he was going with it". He went on to talk positively about the album's material and its musical variation:

He's taking it back to the old 50. And he had some new records that were some different-sounding stuff too. I'm excited to see how people react to it, and hopefully we end up with some stuff on the album. I gave him some stuff he really loved. It's really a blend of the old 50 mixing with the new stuff that he's doing. It's crazy.

Whilst attending the Sundance Film Festival on January 25, 2011, 50 Cent revealed to MTV News that "80 percent" of the album had been recorded, and also revealed that he had recorded material for the album with record producers Boi-1da, Alex da Kid and Symbolyc One. In an interview in March 2011 with online blogger DDotOmen, record producer Cardiak revealed that he had produced a song for the album called "Outlaw", which was later released to several digital outlets to promote the album.

On April 8, 2011, MTV Mixtape Daily reported that producer Jim Jonsin had been involved in the album's recording sessions. In an interview with Rap-Up on May 13, 2011, American rapper Soulja Boy revealed that 50 Cent had requested several productions from him for the album whilst the pair were in California the previous month, and that he had given him roughly five of these productions to record over. He also claimed that 50 Cent had played him all of the material recorded for the album at the time, and was impressed with the material, stating that "His album was dope That's my big bro and all that. I got love for him. He's got some great stuff on there". In an appearance with singer Nicole Scherzinger on The Ellen DeGeneres Show, hosted by comedian and actress Ellen DeGeneres, on May 24, 2011, 50 Cent and Scherzinger performed their single "Right There", and 50 Cent revealed that the album was only a single song away from completion. He also confirmed that the mixing process for the album had already begun.

50 Cent later elaborated on Boi-1da's contribution in an interview with DJ Whoo Kid on the hip-hop radio station Shade 45, when he revealed that Boi-1da had produced two potential songs for the album. In the same interview, he revealed that producer Just Blaze had contributed two song productions for the album.

In September 2011, 50 Cent revealed that he had finished recording material for the album, although it still had to be mixed. He later confirmed Dr. Dre's involvement with Street King Immortal, claiming that he had produced two of the songs on the album. Hip hop producer DJ Felli Fel also revealed that he had produced a song for the album called "Lighters", featuring Chris Brown. He stated that he had wanted the collaboration to occur as 50 Cent and Brown had not previously appeared together on a song. 50 Cent confirmed in a radio interview with Power 92.3, that J.U.S.T.I.C.E. League and Drumma Boy produced songs for the album 5 (Murder by Numbers). However the tracks didn't appear on the free album and were saved for Street King Immortal. 50 Cent confirmed some more producers for the album, who include Jake One, Bangladesh, Dr Dre – who had already produced the first single for the album – and several more. On December 4, 2012, with magazine Billboard, 50 revealed that another producer on the album is Frank Dukes.

While promoting his Animal Ambition LP 50 spoke on SKI coming out later in the year, "It's gonna ride right into it. Street King Immortal is more personal. It's way more personal than this record. Of course this one is about a portion of my actual experience, but that one is...I talk about things that I haven't talked about."

=== Guest appearances ===
Although a confirmed track listing for the album never emerged, several other recording artists were reported to be appearing on the album. On January 24, 2011, Rap-Up reported that fellow rapper and longtime collaborator Eminem would appear on the album, along with Lil' Kim, Akon, Swizz Beatz, Busta Rhymes, and former G-Unit member Lloyd Banks. In the aforementioned interview on Shade 45, 50 Cent elaborated on Eminem's contributions to the album, revealing that he would appear on four songs. He also stated that the songs were designed to appear to various audiences: two of the songs were referred to as "definite singles", and the other two were described as created to appeal to his "core audience", as well as being "more aggressive" and having a "different kind of energy".

On July 11, 2011, while on the set of the video for the Tony Yayo song "Haters", 50 Cent revealed that New Orleans rapper Kidd Kidd, formerly of Young Money Entertainment but now of G-Unit Records, would appear on the album's title track. Chris Brown's contribution to the album was elaborated upon when DJ Felli Fel revealed that he would be on a song titled "Lighters". Black Hippy member Schoolboy Q stated that in addition to having a good rapport with 50 Cent, the two had done multiple collaborations, which could be featured on the album.

On June 29, 2012, the G-Unit Philly rapper Mike Knox tweeted that he was in the studio with 50 Cent and Alicia Keys. Later the lead single featuring her and Dr. Dre was released . In an interview with DJ Whoo Kid on Shade 45 for his birthday, 50 Cent confirmed an upcoming song with Young Jeezy. 50 also stated that he wished to work with Kanye West, adding him to the list of possible featured guests. Drake shouted out 50 Cent while performing at a concert on the latter's birthday. He also talked about his work plans with 50 Cent, making a collaboration between the two rappers possible. 50 Cent stated that he wanted to work with Rihanna and Frank Ocean, in an interview with Digital Spy, making two more appearances possible.

On August 2, 2012, the website of magazine Complex confirmed that there would be appearances from Adam Levine, Chris Brown and Eminem. 50 Cent confirmed in an interview with Global Grind, that he had selected one track of the four he had recorded with Eminem for inclusion on the album. He also stated that another collaboration between them for a bonus track was possible, with Eminem later saying there are multiple tracks on the album that feature both of them.

50 Cent, on September 21, 2012, in an interview with the radio station KDON-FM, confirmed appearances by Eminem, Chris Brown, Ne-Yo and Trey Songz among a list of other guest appearances. In the interview 50 Cent also commented about his new business ventures, the Street King Energy Drink, SMS Audio headphones line and his new upcoming fitness book, Formula 50:

People can expect me, Eminem... I did a song with Chris Brown on the record, Trey Songz. I did a song with Ne-Yo. In the process I recorded with half of the music culture. I worked with everybody. In the past I hadn't reached out to artists and worked with them as much because 'Get Rich or Die Tryin' didn't have anyone that wasn't in house.

On December 4, 2012, 50 Cent's official news website listed more guests for the album, including Wiz Khalifa and the already announced Eminem, Alicia Keys, Ne-Yo and Trey Songz. In an interview with Fuse he announced a guest appearance from GOOD Music artist John Legend. 50 Cent also used Twitter to reveal a collaboration with Kendrick Lamar for the album.

On February 16, 2015, 50 Cent on a Shade 45 radio interview with G-Unit said that he recorded more tracks with Chris Brown for his album. 50 Cent also featured on Chris Brown and Tyga's album Fan of a Fan: The Album which was recorded earlier in the year.

== Composition ==
=== Music and influence ===
While recording Street King Immortal, 50 Cent listened to a mix of music performed by his favourite artists, including rappers Tupac Shakur and The Notorious B.I.G. In an interview with the Detroit Free Press, 50 Cent explained these actions, stating, "I listen to those records to create expectations... It creates a level to me, within myself, of how good the record has to be before I'm ready to launch it." In the same interview, he described the album as a "whole new sound" for him and felt that it was "more soulful" and "more mature" than his previous work.

50 Cent reported, on March 16, 2012, that he believes Street King Immortal will be better than his most successful studio album to date, Get Rich or Die Tryin'. Explaining, he said he had repeatedly listened to the album, and believed it wasn't better than Street King Immortal. On October 17, 2012, 50 Cent mentioned the concept of the album, saying it would be based on its title. When asked about the main theme of it, he said:

Street, King, Immortal! No, the fact is that in this project I am more sensitive than I've been in my earlier projects.

He elaborated on this saying Street King Immortal will be his most insightful album.

== Release and promotion ==
During his appearance on The Ellen DeGeneres Show on May 24, 2011, 50 Cent revealed that Street King Immortal was one song from completion and being mixed, and he expected to release it as early as summer 2011, stating: "This summer they'll have new music from me". However, due to 50 Cent's various disputes with Interscope Records over the promotion and release of the album, including the leakage of several songs intended for the album, the album's release was briefly cancelled by 50 Cent himself, before being rescheduled to November 2011, when it was to be released in conjunction with his headphone line Sleek by 50. The album was then set to be released on July 3, 2012, when it was still believed to be 5 (Murder by Numbers), however, he later decided to make "5 (Murder by Numbers)" as a separate free album, and release a new collection of songs titled "Street King Immortal" as his official fifth studio album in November 2012 instead. Shady Records president Paul Rosenberg announced in February 2013 that Street King Immortal would be released in the first half of 2013. However the album would again be delayed due to staff changes at Interscope Records.

50 Cent had been working on the album since 2010. It has been pushed back several times, with the first release date set for November 13, 2012, then February 26, 2013, and finally September, 2015. In July 2013, 50 Cent opened up about the long delay in an interview with MTV saying: "I don't really need the money off of the record. I want the record to be right. I'm not doing it without a plan; I'm not putting it out like that." He also explained that he needed the support of Interscope Records in order to move forward with the project. "It's a lot of staff changes, a lot of different people moving in and moving out, so you got to kind of wait until everything's right; until it's settled in."

=== Interscope Records tensions ===
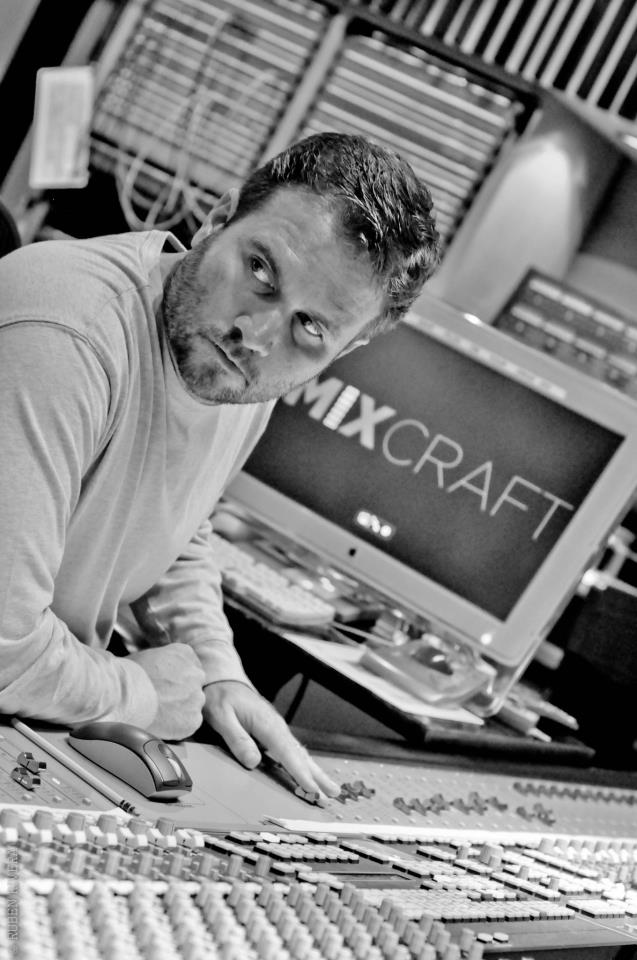
Steve Baughman, music producer, engineer and mixer, assumed mixing duties on the album, as he has with past 50 Cent albums.

Street King Immortal was set to be 50 Cent's final release on his then-current contract at Interscope Records, originally signed when he joined the label in 2002, as the contract requires him to release five albums with the label. However, there have been tensions between 50 Cent and the label throughout the album's recording process. The first reports of disagreement between the label and 50 Cent emerged on June 16, 2011, when 50 Cent released a series of messages through his account on Twitter: he explained that Interscope Records were disputing with him over the album's recording process, and claimed he would delay the album's release until the dispute was resolved. He also stated that the album would not be released during 2011.

The issues with Interscope intensified when a song called "I'm On It", produced by The Cataracs, leaked onto the Internet on July 27, 2011, ahead of its intended release date. 50 Cent blamed Interscope Records for the leakage, and, as he had intended to release the song as the album's next single, revealed through Twitter on July 28, 2011, that he would retaliate against the label by cancelling the release of album. He also revealed that he planned threatening to leak the single from the Dr. Dre album Detox, "The Psycho", in which he is featured. He later clarified his comments, revealing that he was willing to collaborate with other artists during his remaining time at the label, but confirmed that he would not release another album with the label because "[Interscope] dropped the ball with me one time too [sic] many". However, he later retracted these statements, and apologized to Jimmy Iovine, head of Interscope Records, and also to Dr. Dre for threatening to leak "The Psycho", as he stated that the pair of them had been supportive of his career throughout his time at the label.

After his statements were retracted, 50 Cent later announced that the album's release date had been rescheduled to November 2011. In an interview with MTV News on June 22, 2011, 50 Cent revealed that the incident had left him unsure as to whether to resign to Interscope once his five-album contract with the label ended, upon the release of Street King Immortal:

I don't know... It will all be clear in the negotiations following me turning this actual album in. And, of course, the performance and how they actually treat the work will determine whether you still want to stay in that position or not.

Despite these comments, 50 Cent confirmed that it was not certain that he would leave Interscope after the release of the album, admitting that problems with finding a suitable alternative label would be difficult: "If not [signed to a label], if you don't have that support, why would you want to sign to another system?". In an interview with AllHipHop, 50 Cent revealed that he would release the album regardless of whether Interscope wished to promote it or not. He later confirmed on Twitter the release date to be on July 3. He also uploaded the cover for this album as a preview for his fans on June 15 via Instagram and posted the link onto Twitter. The album was released under the name of 5 (Murder by Numbers) as a free download. He later confirmed he will be releasing a proper album in stores later and this was just a free album for the fans to listen to.
