= Get Rich or Die Tryin' (film) =

2005 film directed by Jim Sheridan

- Theatrical release poster
- Directed by: Jim Sheridan
- Written by: Terence Winter
- Produced by: Jimmy Iovine; Chris Lighty; Paul Rosenberg; Jim Sheridan
- Starring: Curtis "50 Cent" Jackson; Terrence Howard; Joy Bryant; Bill Duke; Marc John Jefferies; Leon Robinson; Adewale Akinnuoye-Agbaje; Omar Benson Miller; Viola Davis
- Cinematography: Declan Quinn
- Edited by: Roger Barton; Conrad Buff
- Music by: Quincy Jones; Gavin Friday; Maurice Seezer
- Production companies: MTV Films; G-Unit Films; Interscope/Shady/Aftermath
- Distributed by: Paramount Pictures
- Release dates: November 2, 2005 (Grauman's Chinese Theatre); November 9, 2005 (United States)
- Running time: 117 minutes
- Country: United States
- Language: English
- Budget: $40 million
- Box office: $46.5 million

Get Rich or Die Tryin' is a 2005 American crime drama film directed by Jim Sheridan and written by Terence Winter. It stars Curtis "50 Cent" Jackson in his feature film acting debut, alongside Terrence Howard, Joy Bryant, Bill Duke, Adewale Akinnuoye-Agbaje, Omar Benson Miller, Ashley Walters, and Viola Davis. The film, which contains autobiographical elements from 50 Cent's life, follows his character, Marcus Grier, a drug dealer who turns away from his criminal life to pursue his passion of rap music. The film's title is shared with 50 Cent's 2003 debut album of the same name.

Plans for a film starring 50 Cent were revealed in 2004, following the success of the Get Rich or Die Tryin' album. It was known during production as Locked and Loaded. Similar to the 2002 film 8 Mile starring Eminem, which it used as a template, the film took inspiration from 50 Cent's childhood experiences as a drug dealer. Filming began on April 11, 2005, and ended in June of that same year. The filming locations included New York City, Canada (in Toronto and Wasaga Beach) and Ireland (in Bray and Dublin).

Originally scheduled for a 2006 release, Get Rich or Die Tryin' had its world premiere at Grauman's Chinese Theatre in Hollywood on November 2, 2005, and was released in the United States by Paramount Pictures on November 9. The film initially received negative reviews from critics and was a financial disappointment, grossing $46.5 million on a budget of $40 million. However, it has gained a cult following especially for its soundtrack and remained a standout in 50 Cent's career.

== Plot ==
Marcus is a quiet boy who adores his mother Katrina, and the two live a relatively comfortable life on her drug-dealing income. After Marcus writes a song for his love interest Charlene, her stepfather sends her away to live with her grandparents. Meanwhile, Marcus's mother is murdered, and Marcus has to live with his grandparents full-time. Marcus turns to selling drugs in order to buy new shoes, and as he grows older, he eventually abandons high school to sell drugs for local kingpin, Levar, and his underling, Majestic.

Years later, Marcus reunites with Charlene and the two become intimate. One of his close friends, Antwan, is shot and paralyzed at a club by a Colombian named Raul. In retaliation, Marcus attacks Raul, but stops short of murdering him and instead shoots Raul in the legs multiple times as payback for Antwan. When Raul refuses to identify Marcus as the shooter in a police line-up, he is allowed to go free. However, cops raid his house after an anonymous tip and find a gun and drugs. Marcus is sent to prison, where he befriends another inmate named Bama. Meanwhile, Majestic makes his move to seize control of the local drug trade. He sets Levar up to go to prison, and then frames Levar's second-in-command Odell for it. After publicly torturing and murdering Odell, Majestic then takes over Levar's empire as the new kingpin.

After encouragement from Bama, Marcus leaves the drug trade behind to pursue and fulfill his lifelong dream of being a rapper, calling himself Young Caesar, with Bama as his manager and producer. After Marcus gets out of prison, Majestic invites him to become his right-hand man, but Marcus tells him of his aspirations to being a rapper, which Majestic laughs off. Marcus leaves with Bama and takes Justice with him.

Justice and Bama initially have a clash of personalities, but Marcus calms them after a roadside stop. Unconvinced of Marcus's dream, Justice informs Majestic of his activities. As Marcus more seriously pursues music, Majestic uses threats and his power to try to stop his success. Marcus retaliates by taunting Majestic in his songs, and Majestic targets Marcus for death.

Despite Marcus's insistence at avoiding crime, Bama convinces him to carry out one last robbery on a Colombian safe house. After Marcus and his crew complete the robbery, Marcus is shot outside of his home by Justice, but is saved by his grandparents. After being hospitalized, he goes through a period of self-loathing and pity before reevaluating his life and prioritizing his family. After a long and painful recovery, he records music again.

Angered with Justice's failure to kill Marcus, Majestic kills Justice. Marcus meets with Levar in prison, who remorsefully reveals that he is Marcus's biological father and regrets not being there for him and his mother to protect them.

At Marcus's concert debut, Majestic shows up with his goons and tries to intimidate Marcus as he goes on stage. Majestic reveals that he killed Marcus's mother years earlier for spurning his affections. Marcus attacks Majestic in rage but before he can kill Majestic, Bama persuades him to start the show, urging him to think about his family. As Marcus starts to walk out on stage, Majestic tries to stab him, but Bama shoots Majestic. Majestic begs for Marcus to finish him off, but Marcus refuses. As he walks out towards the crowd, Bama kills Majestic anyway. Marcus steps onto the stage, removes his bulletproof vest and performs "Hustler's Ambition".

== Cast ==
- Curtis "50 Cent" Jackson as Marcus "Young Caesar" Grier
  - Marc John Jefferies as young Marcus Grier
- Terrence Howard as Bama
- Adewale Akinnuoye-Agbaje as Majestic
- Joy Bryant as Charlene
  - Rhyon Nicole Brown as young Charlene
- Omar Benson Miller as Keryl
- Tory Kittles as Justice
- Ashley Walters as Antwan
  - Steve Prempeh as young Antwan
- Viola Davis as Viola Greer
- Sullivan Walker as Wesley Grier
- Serena Reeder as Katrina Grier
- Leon Robinson as Slim
- Bill Duke as Levar
- Mpho Koaho as Junebug
- Russell Hornsby as Odell
- Joseph Jomo Pierre as Uncle Deuce
- Ryan Allen as Uncle Roy
- Pedro Miguel Arce as Cash Counting Guard
- Rogue Johnston as Coin Fiend
- Boyd Banks as Prison Solitary Guard
- Mykelti Williamson as Charlene's step-father (uncredited)
- Destan Owens as Charlene's Friend

== Soundtrack ==
The soundtrack was released on November 8, 2005. In December 2005, the Recording Industry Association of America (RIAA) certified the album platinum. The album has so far sold over 3 million copies worldwide.

== Controversy ==
Samuel L. Jackson publicly turned down an offer to co-star in the film, citing that he did not want to lend credence to what he believed was an inexperienced and unproven actor. Film critic Roger Ebert wrote that Jackson may be "arguing against the anti-intellectual message that success for young black males is better sought in the worlds of rapping and sports than in the classroom." Jackson and 50 Cent later co-starred in the 2006 film Home of the Brave.

== Reception ==
Get Rich or Die Tryin' holds a 17% critics' approval rating at Rotten Tomatoes based upon 120 reviews. The site's critical consensus reads, "While it may be based upon 50 Cent's own life experiences, Get Rich or Die Tryin' is too similar to many other rags-to-riches stories to resonate." Metacritic, which uses a weighted average, assigned the film a score of 45 out of 100, based on 33 critics, indicating "mixed or average" reviews. Radio Times criticized the film, saying that "as a vehicle for hip-hop superstar Curtis '50 Cent' Jackson, this [film] runs out of gas a fair few kilometres short", giving it a "could be worse" rating of 2/5 stars. CinePassion stated that "[Jim] Sheridan's surface vividness is applied around a vacuum."

FilmFocus said that the film's "real danger is that it sets a precedent for the director; if the price is right he's on board". The BBC was not entirely impressed with the film, saying that "while it boasts a first-class director and is loosely based on the rapper's own life-story, the results leave you feeling a little short-changed".

Jonathan Ross gave a positive review, calling Get Rich or Die Tryin' "gripping" and suggesting that it had "excellent performances". Roger Ebert also praised the film, giving the film a 3 out of 4 rating and saying that it was "a film with a rich and convincing texture, a drama with power and anger".

In retrospect, director Jim Sheridan, said: “Get Rich came out the wrong way. I thought 'I can do this.' I'm there directing 50 Cent and he's looking blank, and I'm thinking 'this is great. The American audience will get this. When they look at John Wayne and his face is blank, they know exactly what he's thinking. So I'm thinking 'this is like John Wayne.' I was wrong.“ He also added: "When you look at 50 Cent and his face is blank you go 'what ... is he thinking?' He's not John Wayne. My empathy tripped me up. I got it, so I assumed the audience would. They didn't." Screenwriter Terrence Winter is also unhappy with the movie and said it “bears absolutely no resemblance to the script I wrote.“: “The mandate for that movie was to write the black Goodfellas and I said, “Great.” That's what I did in my original draft. It didn't turn out to be the black Goodfellas at all. Unfortunately, it turned into something completely different but that was at least what our intention was initially.“

Audiences polled by CinemaScore gave the film an average grade "A−" on an A+ to F scale.

Get Rich or Die Tryin' grossed $12,020,807 in its opening weekend. Altogether, the film grossed $46,442,528 in total worldwide.

== Home media ==
Get Rich or Die Tryin' was first released on VHS and DVD on March 28, 2006. It was later released on Blu-ray in 2021.

== See also ==
- 8 Mile
- Notorious
- All Eyez on Me
- List of hood films
