= G-Unit discography =

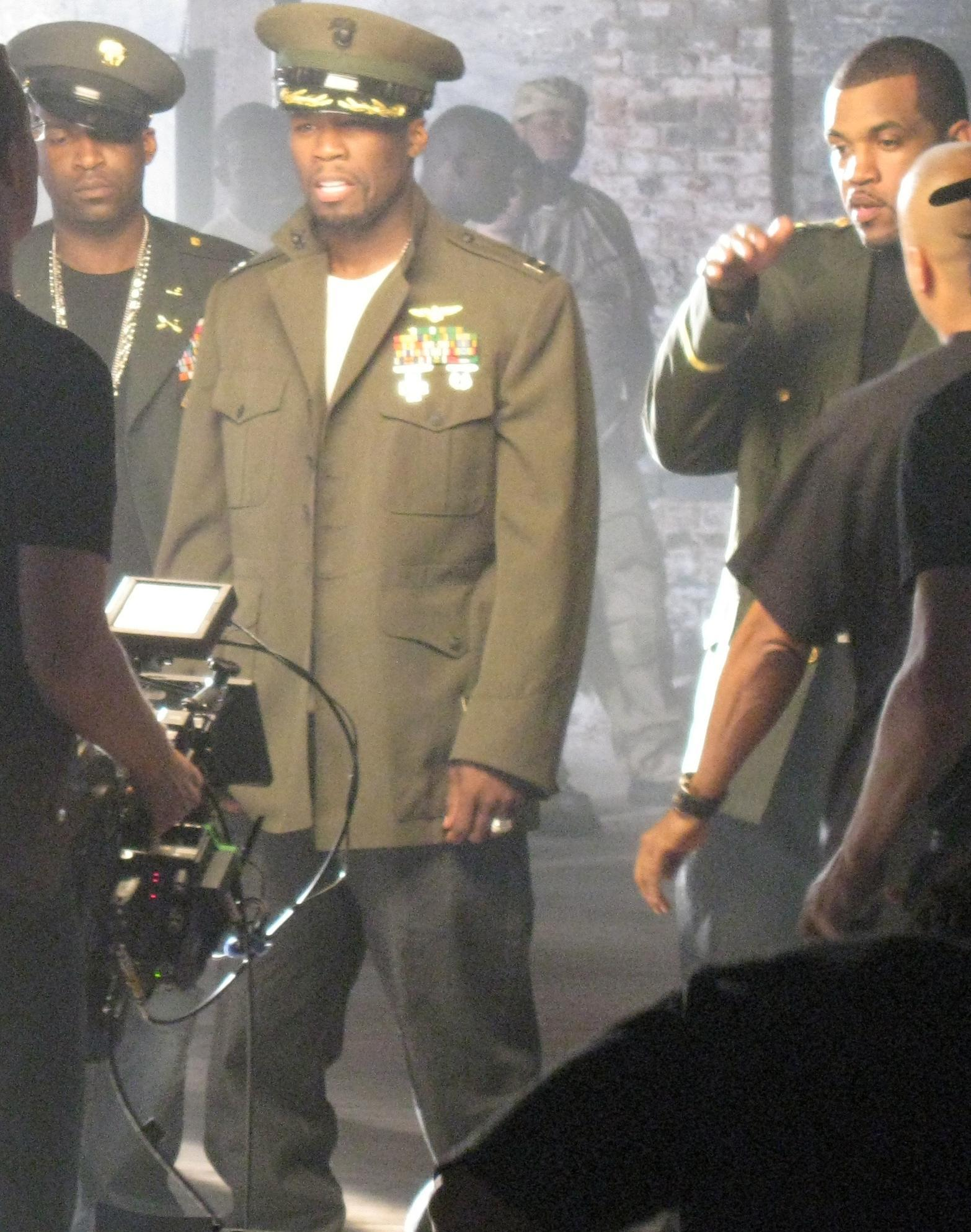
- From left to right: Tony Yayo, 50 Cent & Lloyd Banks at the "Rider Pt. 2" video shoot
- Studio albums: 2
- Extended plays: 2
- Singles: 8
- Music videos: 12
- Mixtapes: 33

The discography of G-Unit, an American hip hop group, consists of two studio albums, two extended plays (EP), one soundtrack album, 43 mixtapes and 10 singles (including three as a featured artist). Music videos and collaborations are also included.

The group's members all grew up in South Jamaica, Queens, and when 50 Cent was spotted and signed to a label, both Lloyd Banks and Tony Yayo worked on mixtapes in order to gain attention as artists themselves. 50 Cent was later dropped from his label after being shot nine times in front of his grandmother's house; his label saw him as too much of a risk to keep. After being shot, 50 Cent signed to Interscope Records, who granted him his own record label later on due to the success of his debut album, Get Rich or Die Tryin'. G-Unit continued to record and released several mixtape series which earned them attention in the rap industry, including 50 Cent Is the Future, God’s Plan, No Mercy, No Fear and Automatic Gunfire.

== Albums ==
=== Studio albums ===
List of studio albums, with selected chart positions and certifications
| Title | Album details | Peak chart positions | | | | | | | | | | Certifications |
| Title | Album details | US | US R&B | US Rap | AUS | CAN | GER | IRE | NZ | SWI | UK | Certifications |
|---|---|---|---|---|---|---|---|---|---|---|---|---|
| Beg for Mercy | Released: November 14, 2003; Label: G-Unit, Interscope; Format: CD, LP, digital download | 2 | 2 | 3 | 31 | 5 | 57 | 10 | 26 | 28 | 13 | RIAA: 2× Platinum; MC: 2× Platinum; BPI: Platinum |
| T.O.S. (Terminate on Sight) | Released: July 1, 2008; Label: G-Unit, Interscope; Format: CD, LP, digital download | 4 | 2 | 2 | 35 | 4 | 54 | 99 | 76 | 25 | 100 | |

== Extended plays ==
List of extended plays, with selected chart positions and sales figures
| Title | EP details | Peak chart positions | | | Sales |
| Title | EP details | US | US R&B/HH | US Rap | Sales |
|---|---|---|---|---|---|
| The Beauty of Independence | Released: August 25, 2014; Label: G-Unit; Format: CD, digital download | 17 | 5 | 3 | |
| The Beast Is G Unit | Released: March 3, 2015; Label: G-Unit; Format: CD, digital download | 27 | 3 | 3 | US: 23,000 |

== Mixtapes ==
List of mixtapes, with selected chart positions
| Title | Mixtape details | Peak chart positions | |
| Title | Mixtape details | SWI | UK |
|---|---|---|---|
| 50 Cent Is the Future (with 50 Cent) | Released: June 1, 2002; Label: G-Unit, Shadyville; Format: CD, digital download | 59 | 65 |
| No Mercy, No Fear (with 50 Cent) | Released: August 1, 2002; Label: G-Unit, Shadyville; Format: CD, digital download | — | — |
| God's Plan (with 50 Cent) | Released: November 1, 2002; Label: G-Unit, Shadyville; Format: CD, digital download | — | — |
| Automatic Gunfire | Released: January 1, 2003; Label: G-Unit, Shadyville; Format: CD, digital download | — | — |
| Bulletproof | Released: February 11, 2003; Label: G-Unit, Shadyville; Format: CD, digital download | — | — |
| Smokin' Day 2 (G-Unit Radio Part 1) | Released: March 29, 2003; Label: G-Unit, Shadyville; Format: CD, digital download | — | — |
| International Ballers (G-Unit Radio Part 2) | Released: June 10, 2003; Label: G-Unit, Shadyville; Format: CD, digital download | — | — |
| Takin' It to the Streets (G-Unit Radio Part 3) | Released: August 13, 2003; Label: G-Unit, Shadyville; Format: CD, digital download | — | — |
| No Peace Talks! (G-Unit Radio Part 4) | Released: November 24, 2003; Label: G-Unit, Shadyville; Format: CD, digital download | — | — |
| All Eyez on Us (G-Unit Radio Part 5) | Released: January 29, 2004; Label: G-Unit, Shadyville; Format: CD, digital download | — | — |
| Motion Picture Shit (G-Unit Radio Part 6) | Released: April 1, 2004; Label: G-Unit, Shadyville; Format: CD, digital download | — | — |
| King of New York (G-Unit Radio Part 7) | Released: May 6, 2004; Label: G-Unit, Shadyville; Format: CD, digital download | — | — |
| The Fifth Element (G-Unit Radio Part 8) | Released: July 29, 2004; Label: G-Unit, Shadyville; Format: CD, digital download | — | — |
| Grand Theft Auto - G-Unit City (G-Unit Radio Part 9) | Released: November 17, 2004; Label: G-Unit, Shadyville; Format: CD, digital download | — | — |
| 2050 Before the Massacre (G-Unit Radio Part 10) | Released: January 7, 2005; Label: G-Unit, Shadyville; Format: CD, digital download | — | — |
| Yayo Raw-N-Uncut (G-Unit Radio Part 11) | Released: May 2, 2005; Label: G-Unit, Shadyville; Format: CD, digital download | — | — |
| Olivia So Seductive (G-Unit Radio Part 12) | Released: July 8, 2005; Label: G-Unit, Shadyville; Format: CD, digital download | — | — |
| The Return of the Mixtape Millionaire (G-Unit Radio Part 13) | Released: September 3, 2005; Label: G-Unit, Shadyville; Format: CD, digital download | — | — |
| Back to Business (G-Unit Radio Part 14) | Released: October 1, 2005; Label: G-Unit, Shadyville; Format: CD, digital download | — | — |
| Are You a Window Shopper? (G-Unit Radio Part 15) | Released: October 22, 2005; Label: G-Unit, Shadyville; Format: CD, digital download | — | — |
| Crucified 4 The Hood - 10 Years of Hate (G-Unit Radio Part 16) | Released: January 21, 2006; Label: G-Unit, Shadyville; Format: CD, digital download | — | — |
| Best in the Bizness (G-Unit Radio Part 17) | Released: February 27, 2006; Label: G-Unit, Shadyville; Format: CD, digital download | — | — |
| Rags 2 Riches (G-Unit Radio Part 18) | Released: April 10, 2006; Label: G-Unit, Shadyville; Format: CD, digital download | — | — |
| Rep Yo' Click (G-Unit Radio Part 19) | Released: April 10, 2006; Label: G-Unit, Shadyville; Format: CD, digital download | — | — |
| Best in the Bizness 2 (G-Unit Radio Part 20) | Released: April 10, 2006; Label: G-Unit, Shadyville; Format: CD, digital download | — | — |
| Hate It or Love It - Verse 1 (G-Unit Radio Part 21) | Released: July 3, 2006; Label: G-Unit, Shadyville; Format: CD, digital download | — | — |
| Hip Hop Is Dead -Verse 2 (G-Unit Radio Part 22) | Released: September 7, 2006; Label: G-Unit, Shadyville; Format: CD, digital download | — | — |
| Finally Off Papers (G-Unit Radio Part 23) | Released: February 22, 2007; Label: G-Unit, Shadyville; Format: CD, digital download | — | — |
| The Clean Up Man (G-Unit Radio Part 24) | Released: March 1, 2007; Label: G-Unit, Shadyville; Format: CD, digital download | — | — |
| Sabrina's Baby Boy (G-Unit Radio Part 25) | Released: October 1, 2007; Label: G-Unit, Shadyville; Format: CD, digital download | — | — |
| Return of the Body Snatchers (ThisIs50 Volume 1) | Released: February 12, 2008; Label: G-Unit, Shadyville; Format: CD, digital download | — | — |
| Elephant in the Sand (ThisIs50 Volume 2) | Released: March 11, 2008; Label: G-Unit, Shadyville; Format: CD, digital download | — | — |
| Sincerely Yours, SouthSide (ThisIs50 Volume 3) | Released: June 20, 2008; Label: G-Unit, Shadyville; Format: CD, digital download | — | — |
| The Lost Flash Drive (Hosted By: DJ Whoo Kid) | Released: August 30, 2016; Label: G-Unit; Format: Digital download | — | — |
"—" denotes a recording that did not chart or was not released in that territory.

== Singles ==
=== As lead artist ===
| Title | Year | Peak chart positions | | | | | | | | | | Certifications | Album |
| Title | Year | US | US R&B | US Rap | AUS | BEL | FRA | GER | IRE | NZ | UK | Certifications | Album |
|---|---|---|---|---|---|---|---|---|---|---|---|---|---|
| "Stunt 101" | 2003 | 13 | 7 | 5 | 32 | 41 | 63 | 39 | 23 | 13 | 25 | RMNZ: Gold | Beg for Mercy |
| "Poppin' Them Thangs" | 2003 | — | 66 | — | — | — | — | — | 11 | — | 10 | BPI: Silver; RMNZ: Platinum | Beg for Mercy |
| "My Buddy" | 2003 | — | — | — | — | — | — | — | — | — | — | | Beg for Mercy |
| "Wanna Get to Know You" (featuring Joe) | 2004 | 15 | 10 | 5 | 30 | — | — | — | 34 | 26 | 27 | RMNZ: Platinum | Beg for Mercy |
| "Smile" | 2004 | — | 72 | — | — | — | — | — | 34 | — | — | RMNZ: Gold | Beg for Mercy |
| "I Like the Way She Do It" (featuring Young Buck) | 2008 | 95 | 54 | 23 | — | — | — | — | — | — | 117 | | T·O·S (Terminate on Sight) |
| "Rider Pt. 2" (featuring Young Buck) | 2008 | 122 | 82 | — | — | — | — | — | — | — | — | | T·O·S (Terminate on Sight) |
| "Come Up" | 2014 | — | — | — | — | — | — | — | — | — | — | | Non-album single |
| "Set the Pick" | 2016 | — | — | — | — | — | — | — | — | — | — | | The Lost Flash Drive |
"—" denotes releases that did not chart or receive certification.

=== As featured artist ===
| Title | Year | Peak chart positions | | | | | Album |
| Title | Year | US | US R&B | US Rap | AUS | UK | Album |
|---|---|---|---|---|---|---|---|
| "Ride Wit U" (Joe featuring G-Unit) | 2004 | 56 | 22 | — | 32 | 12 | And Then... |
| "I Know You Don't Love Me" (Tony Yayo featuring G-Unit) | 2005 | — | 105 | — | — | — | Thoughts of a Predicate Felon |
| "Rompe"(International Remix) (Daddy Yankee featuring G-Unit and Nelly Furtado) | 2006 | 24 | 89 | 16 | — | — | Barrio Fino En Directo |
"—" denotes releases that did not chart.

== Other charted songs ==
| Title | Year | Peak chart positions | Certifications | Album |
| Title | Year | US R&B | Certifications | Album |
|---|---|---|---|---|
| "Groupie Love" (featuring Butch Cassidy) | 2003 | 104 | | Beg for Mercy |
| "Gangsta Shit" | 2003 | 123 | | Beg for Mercy |
| "I Smell Pussy" | 2003 | — | RMNZ: Gold | Beg for Mercy |
| "Straight Outta Southside" | 2008 | 112 | | T.O.S: Terminate on Sight |

== Guest appearances ==
List of non-single guest appearances, with other performing artists, showing year released and album name
| Title | Year | Other performer(s) | Album |
|---|---|---|---|
| "Bad News" | 2002 | N/A | Friday After Next (soundtrack) |
| "Follow Me Gangster" | 2003 | N/A | Cradle 2 the Grave (soundtrack) |
| "Ooh!" (Remix) | 2003 | Mary J Blige | Soul Is Forever - The Remix Album |
| "Bump Heads" | 2003 | Eminem, DJ Green Lantern | Straight from the Lab / Invasion Part II: Conspiracy Theory |
| "44's Calicos Part II" | 2003 | P$C | Gangsta Grillz Meets T.I. / P$C in da Streets |
| "Angels Around Me" | 2004 | DJ Kay Slay | The Streetsweeper, Vol. 2 |
| "Unconditionally" | 2004 | Olivia | Barbershop 2: Back in Business (soundtrack) |
| "DPG-Unit" | 2004 | Snoop Dogg, Daz Dillinger, Soopafly | Straight Outta Cashville |
| "A.T.L. to L.A. to N.Y.C." | 2004 | Akon, The Game | Trouble |
| "I'm So Sorry" | 2004 | The Game | You Know What It Is, Vol. 2: Throwin' Rocks At the Throne |
| "Loyal to the Game" | 2004 | 2Pac | Loyal to the Game |
| "Hate It or Love It" (Remix) | 2005 | 50 Cent, The Game | The Massacre |
| "Talk 'Bout Me" | 2007 | DJ Drama | Gangsta Grillz: The Album |
| "Respect the Shooter" | 2008 | 615, Spider Loc | The Hustle Don't Stop |
| "Así Soy" | 2009 | Wisin & Yandel | Un Junte Pa' La Historia |
| "Men of Respect" | 2010 | DJ Kayslay, Papoose, Jim Jones, Rell | More Than Just a DJ |
| "100" | 2015 | D12 | The Devil's Night Mixtape |

== Music videos ==
| Title | Year | Director(s) |
|---|---|---|
| "Stunt 101" | 2003 | Bryan Barber |
| "Poppin' Them Thangs" | 2003 | Mr. X |
| "My Buddy" | 2003 | Chris "Broadway" Romero |
| "Wanna Get to Know You" | 2004 | Jessy Terrero |
| "Smile" | 2004 | Jessy Terrero & Antoinette Parkinson |
| "I Like the Way She Do It" | 2008 | Jessy Terrero |
| "Rider Pt. 2" | 2008 | Jessy Terrero |
| "Get Down" | 2008 | The ICU |
| "Close to Me" | 2008 | Chris Romero |
| "Nah I'm Talkin Bout" | 2014 | Eif Rivera |
| "Come Up" | 2014 | Eif Rivera |
| "Ahhh Shit" | 2014 | Timo Albert |
| "Watch Me" | 2014 | Eif Rivera |
| "Changes" | 2014 | 50 Cent |
| "I'm Grown" | 2015 | Eif Rivera |
| "Set The Pick" | 2016 | Eif Rivera |

== See also ==
- 50 Cent albums discography
- 50 Cent singles discography
- Lloyd Banks discography
- Tony Yayo discography
- Young Buck discography
- Kidd Kidd
