= I Like the Way She Do It =

- "I Like the Way She Do It" CD cover

Single by G-Unit featuring Young Buck

from the album T·O·S (Terminate on Sight)
- Released: April 22, 2008
- Recorded: 2008
- Genre: Hip hop
- Length: 3:56
- Label: G-Unit; Interscope
- Songwriters: Curtis Jackson; Christopher Lloyd; Marvin Bernard; David Brown; Jesse Matthews; Kendred Smith
- Producer: Street Radio

G-Unit featuring Young Buck singles chronology
| "Smile" (2004) | "I Like the Way She Do It" (2008) | "Rider Pt. 2" (2008) |

"I Like the Way She Do It" is the lead single from G-Unit's second album T·O·S (Terminate on Sight), it features Young Buck, as he was no longer a member of G-Unit at the time. The song has since sold over 350,000 copies.

== Music video ==
The music video features 50 Cent, Lloyd Banks and Tony Yayo. The video premiered on May 12, 2008, on BET's Access Granted. Since Young Buck was released from G-Unit (though still signed to G-Unit Records as a solo artist) he is not featured in the video, and his verse is cut. At the end there is the beginning of the Rider Pt. 2 video. The music video on YouTube has received over 5 million views as of May 2024.

== Critical reception ==
PrefixMag wrote about how they thought only the beat, produced by Street Radio, would "make this song chart well". AllHipHop called the song "Down right awful". HipHopDX also stated that the song was "nothing short of embarrassing".

"I Like the Way She Do It" peaked at #95 on the Billboard Hot 100.

== Censorship ==
In the super clean version of the song, which the music video of it was the premier in BET's Access Granted, the song censors half the song, particularly the chorus with the lines "back into it", "drop it low" and "ass drop", while the normal clean version just censors the word "ass" in the chorus, along with other profanities in the song. Other additional censors in the super clean version are "freak", "rough", "switch [positions]", "hit it", "neck it", and "come up". Some clean versions of the song have an additional censor to the word "retarded", when 50 Cent says he's got "retarded money".

== Track listing ==
| # | Title | Time |
|---|---|---|
| 1 | "I Like the Way She Do It (super clean)" | 3:58 |
| 2 | "I Like the Way She Do It (clean)" | 3:58 |
| 3 | "I Like the Way She Do It (instrumental)" | 3:58 |
| 4 | "I Like the Way She Do It (clean a capella)" | 3:41 |
| 5 | "I Like the Way She Do It (dirty)" | 3:56 |

== Chart performance ==
| Chart (2008) | Peak position |
|---|---|
| U.S. Billboard Hot 100 | 95 |
| U.S. Billboard Hot R&B/Hip-Hop Songs | 54 |
| U.S. Billboard Hot Rap Tracks | 23 |
| U.S. Billboard Pop 100 | 117 |
