= Stunt 101 =

Single by G-Unit

from the album Beg for Mercy
- Released: September 23, 2003
- Recorded: 2003
- Genre: Gangsta rap
- Length: 3:52
- Label: Interscope; G-Unit
- Songwriters: Curtis Jackson III; Christopher Lloyd; David Brown
- Producer: Mr. Porter

G-Unit singles chronology
| "Stunt 101" (2003) | "Poppin' Them Thangs" (2003) |

"Stunt 101" is the debut single from G-Unit's debut album, Beg for Mercy. The song was produced by Mr. Porter. It reached number 13 in the U.S. and number 25 in the UK. Stunt 101 is the group's most successful song to date, charting the highest on the most charts. The single was released by Interscope Records and 50 Cent's G-Unit Records.

In 2022, "Stunt 101" was sampled on "Pump 101" by British rappers Digga D and Still Brickin', which reached number 9 on the UK Singles Chart.

== Music video ==
The music video, inspired by the film Gone in 60 Seconds, begins with 50 Cent walking into an exotic car dealership and being approached by a saleswoman (played by Brandy), who invites him to examine a Porsche 993 on their showroom floor. 50 Cent makes clear his interest in both the car and Brandy, the coy exchange between the two culminates in him stealing the Porsche out of the showroom (with Brandy still in the passenger seat) by ramming through the front window of the dealership. They soon find themselves engaging in a high speed chase across town with the police in hot pursuit. 50 Cent, Lloyd Banks & Young Buck all rap their verses separately in a giant car garage with models washing the cars as a backdrop. Written on a wall behind them is a list of other cars they are targeting, which is only visible by blacklight. 50's verse takes place in the garage and in alleyway. Bank's verse is featured while he sits in a room with money piled everywhere, including a dryer that has money tumbling inside it (a common method of authentically distressing counterfeit money). Buck's verse takes place while he sits in a room filled with money that he's counting, as well as in a night-time street scene with a car carrier. At the end of the video the police drive into an alley and shine blacklights on the wall, only to find 'Free Yayo' written on the wall instead of the list of cars. Mr. Porter has a cameo in the video. The music video on YouTube has received over 40 million views as of May 2024.

== Chart positions ==
=== Weekly charts ===
| Chart (2003–2004) | Peak position |
|---|---|
| Australia (ARIA) | 32 |
| Australian Urban (ARIA) | 11 |
| Austria (Ö3 Austria Top 40) | 72 |
| Belgium (Ultratop 50 Flanders) | 41 |
| Belgium (Ultratip Bubbling Under Wallonia) | 5 |
| France (SNEP) | 63 |
| Germany (GfK) | 39 |
| Netherlands (Single Top 100) | 71 |
| New Zealand (Recorded Music NZ) | 13 |
| Scotland Singles (OCC) | 32 |
| Switzerland (Schweizer Hitparade) | 19 |
| UK Hip Hop/R&B (OCC) | 6 |
| UK Singles (OCC) | 25 |
| US Billboard Hot 100 | 13 |
| US Hot R&B/Hip-Hop Songs (Billboard) | 7 |
| US Hot Rap Songs (Billboard) | 5 |

=== Year-end charts ===
| Chart (2004) | Position |
|---|---|
| Switzerland (Schweizer Hitparade) | 97 |
| US Hot R&B/Hip-Hop Songs (Billboard) | 66 |

== Certifications ==
| Region | Certification | Certified units/sales |
|---|---|---|
| New Zealand (RMNZ) | Gold | 15,000^{‡} |
^{‡} Sales+streaming figures based on certification alone.
