= Rider Pt. 2 =

Single by G-Unit

from the album T·O·S (Terminate on Sight)
- Released: April 22, 2008
- Recorded: 2008
- Genre: Hip hop; gangsta rap
- Length: 3:02
- Label: G-Unit; Interscope
- Songwriters: Curtis Jackson; Marvin Bernard; Christopher Lloyd; Ricardo Thomas
- Producer: Rick Rock

G-Unit singles chronology
| "I Like the Way She Do It" (2008) | "Rider Pt. 2" (2008) | "Close to Me" (2008) |

"Rider Pt. 2" is a song recorded by G-Unit. It was released in April 2008 as the second single from their second album, T·O·S (Terminate on Sight). The song was featured on G-Unit's mixtape, Elephant In The Sand and the beat was originally used in Where Them Hammerz At? by 40 Glocc, and he was also featured on a version of Rider Pt. 2. 50 Cent uses the Auto-Tune effect in the intro and chorus of the song. The clean version removes all profanity while the video version removes all profanity and violence. Almost half of the lyrics were censored.

== Music video ==
The Rider Pt. 2 video premiered Wednesday May 28 on BET. Young Buck's verse was excluded on the video despite his verse being included on the album. The music video on YouTube has received over 4 million views as of May 2024.

== Track listing ==
| # | Title | Time |
|---|---|---|
| 1 | "Rider Pt. 2 (clean)" | 2:51 |
| 2 | "Rider Pt. 2 (dirty)" | 2:51 |
| 3 | "Rider Pt. 2 (instrumental)" | 2:51 |
| 4 | "Rider Pt. 2 (clean, extended)" | 3:02 |
| 5 | "Rider Pt. 2 (dirty, extended)" | 3:02 |

== Charts ==
| Chart (2008) | Peak position |
|---|---|
| US Bubbling Under Hot 100 (Billboard) | 22 |
| US Hot R&B/Hip-Hop Songs (Billboard) | 82 |

== In popular culture ==
Rider Pt. 2 was used as the entrance song for Pete Sell at UFC 96.

== Alternate versions ==
The official remix of the single is called "Así Soy (Rider Pt. 2 Official Remix)", and it features the reggaeton duo Wisin & Yandel. It was released in June 2008. G-Unit made a surprise appearance and performed the remix with Wisin & Yandel at Solid Fest in Caracas, Venezuela on January 31, 2009.

Rider Pt. 2 is the second part of the Rider songs. The first part is known as Rider 4 Real. The track includes different lyrics and a different beat. The track first appeared on the Return of the Body Snatchers mixtape by G-Unit. A music video was made of Rider 4 Real.

"Rider Freestyle" is a version recorded by rapper KRS-One in 2008.

Another remix has the same beat as "Rider Pt. 2" and includes excerpts of G-Unit's verses from "Pt. 2" but also features rappers Papoose and Lil' Kim.

== Video shoot gallery ==
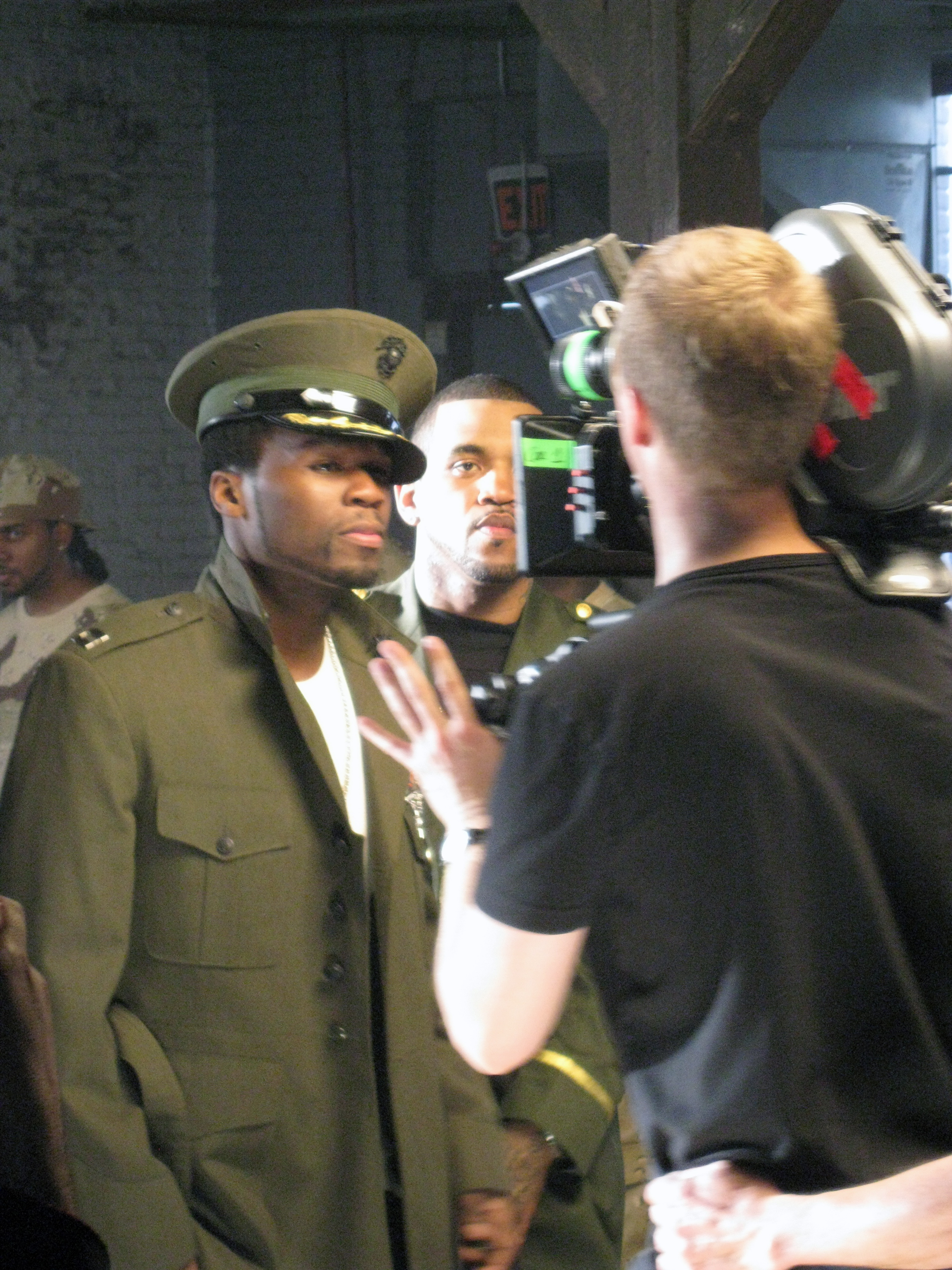

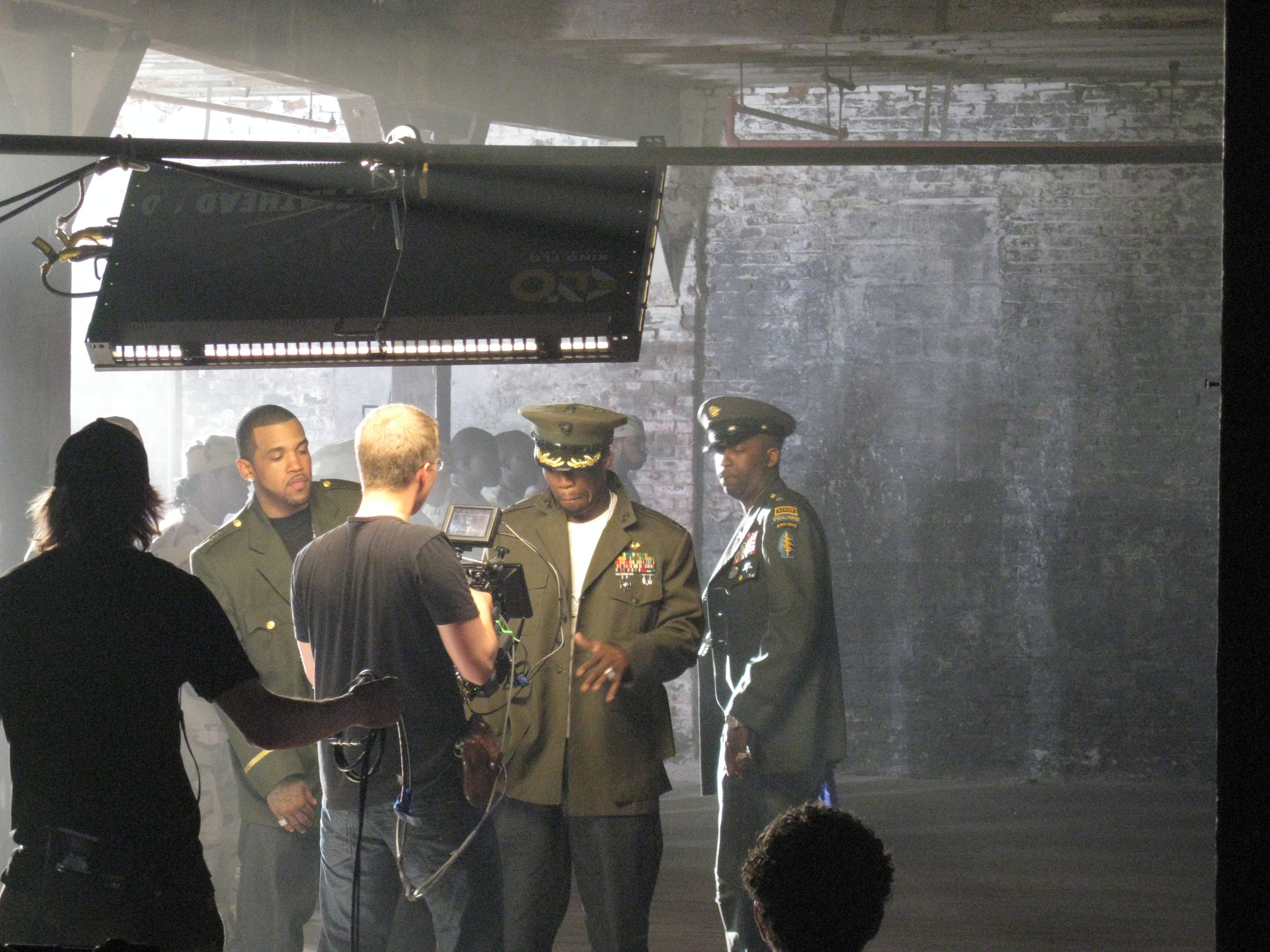

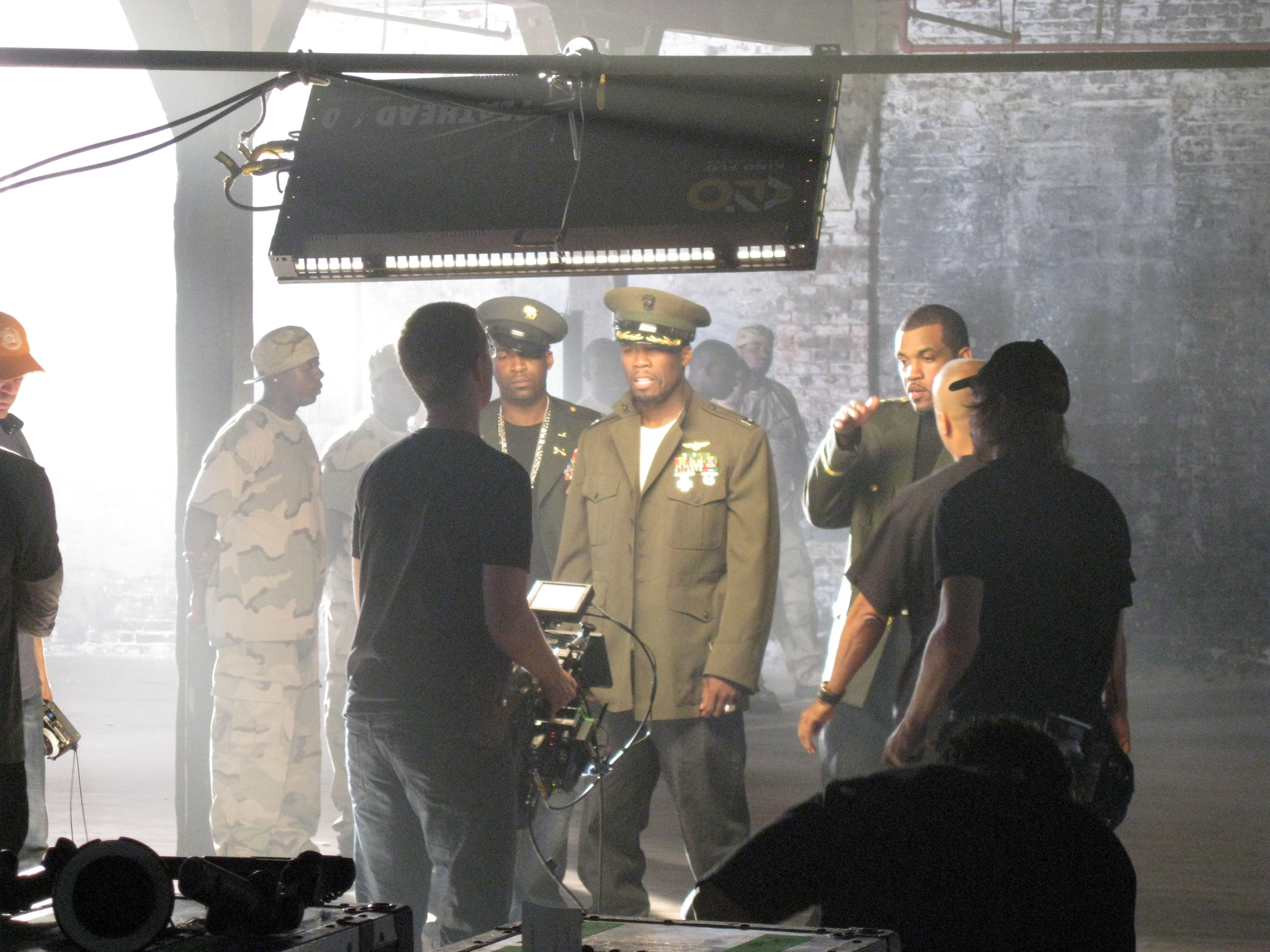

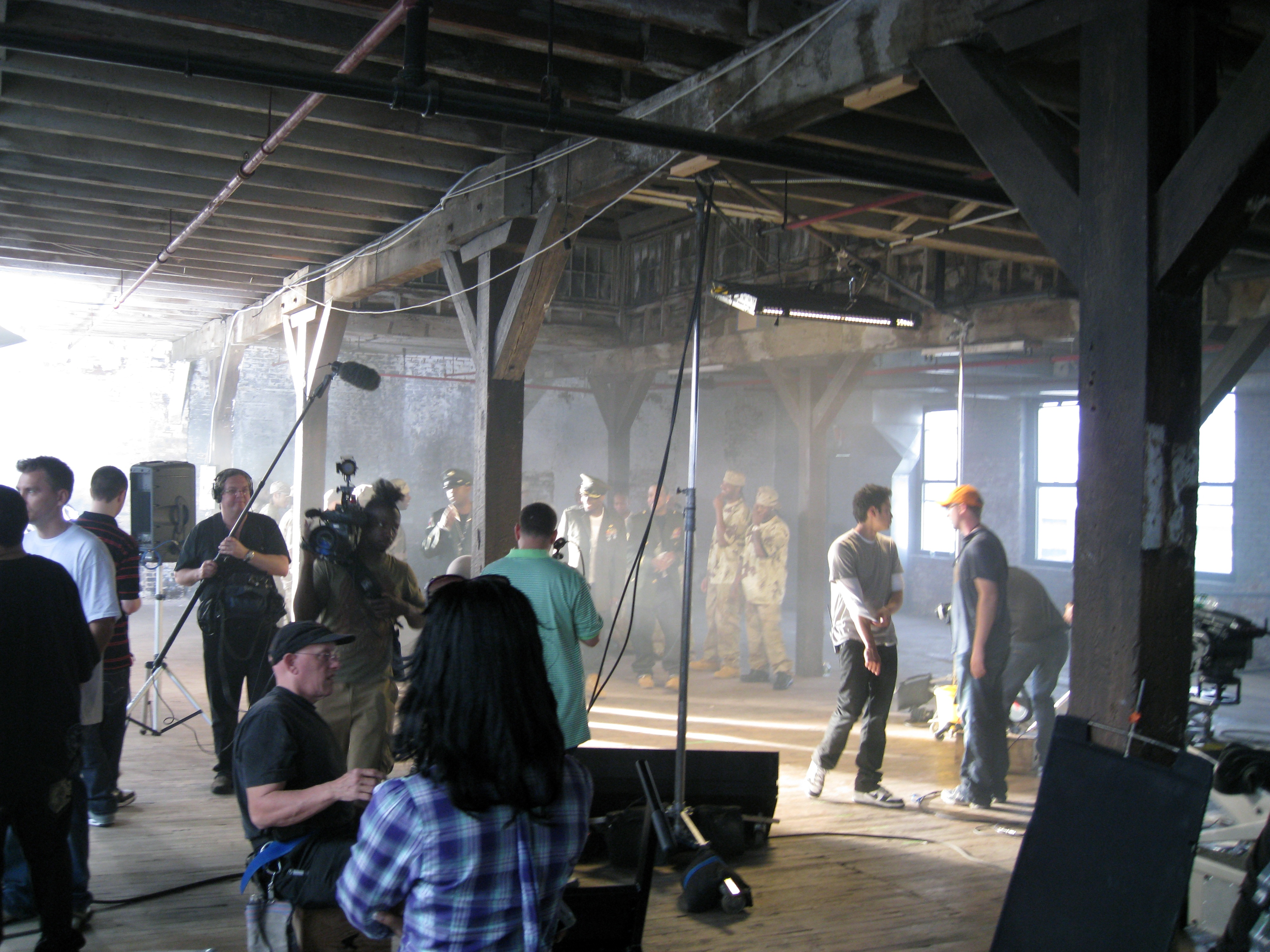

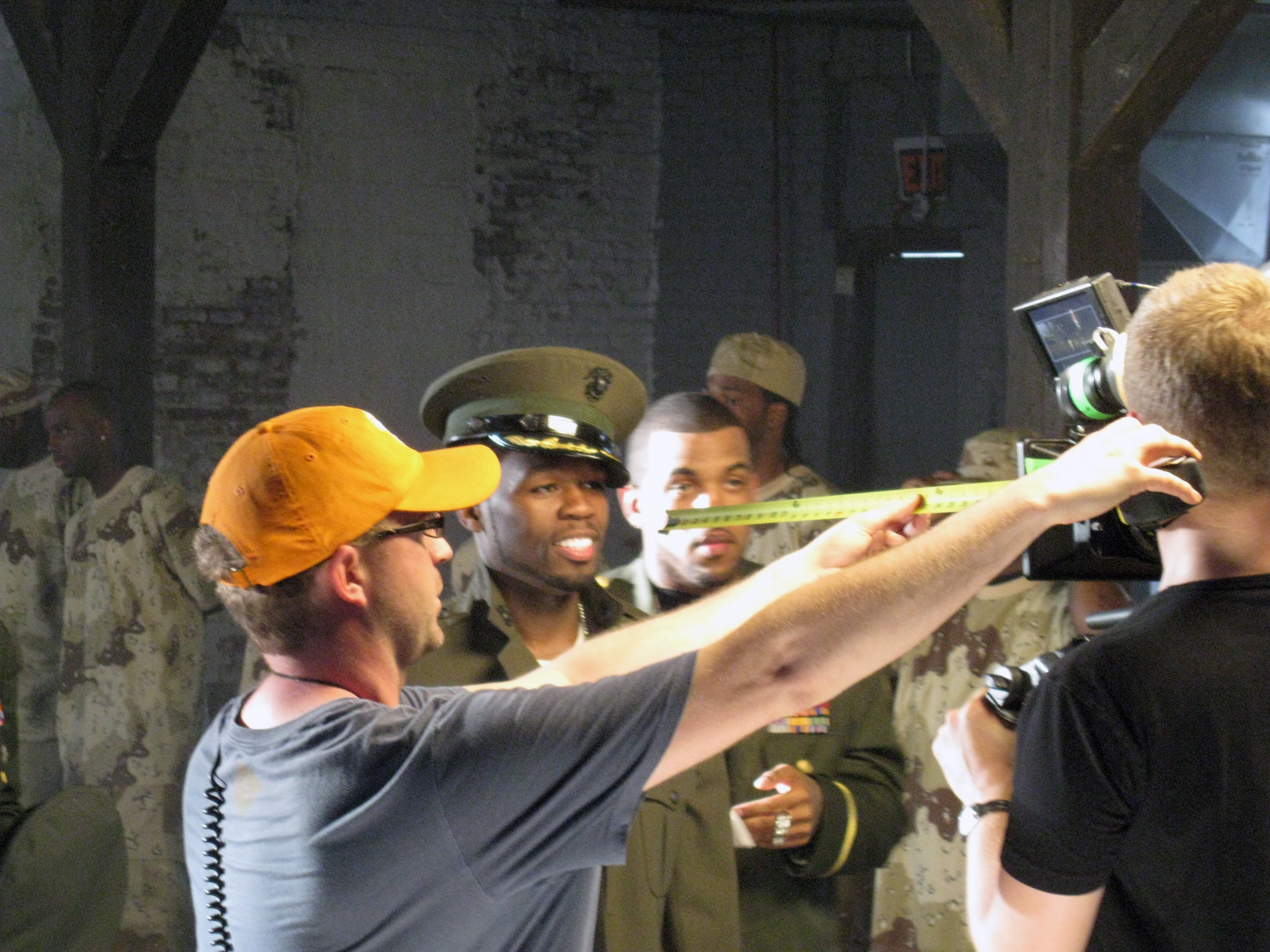

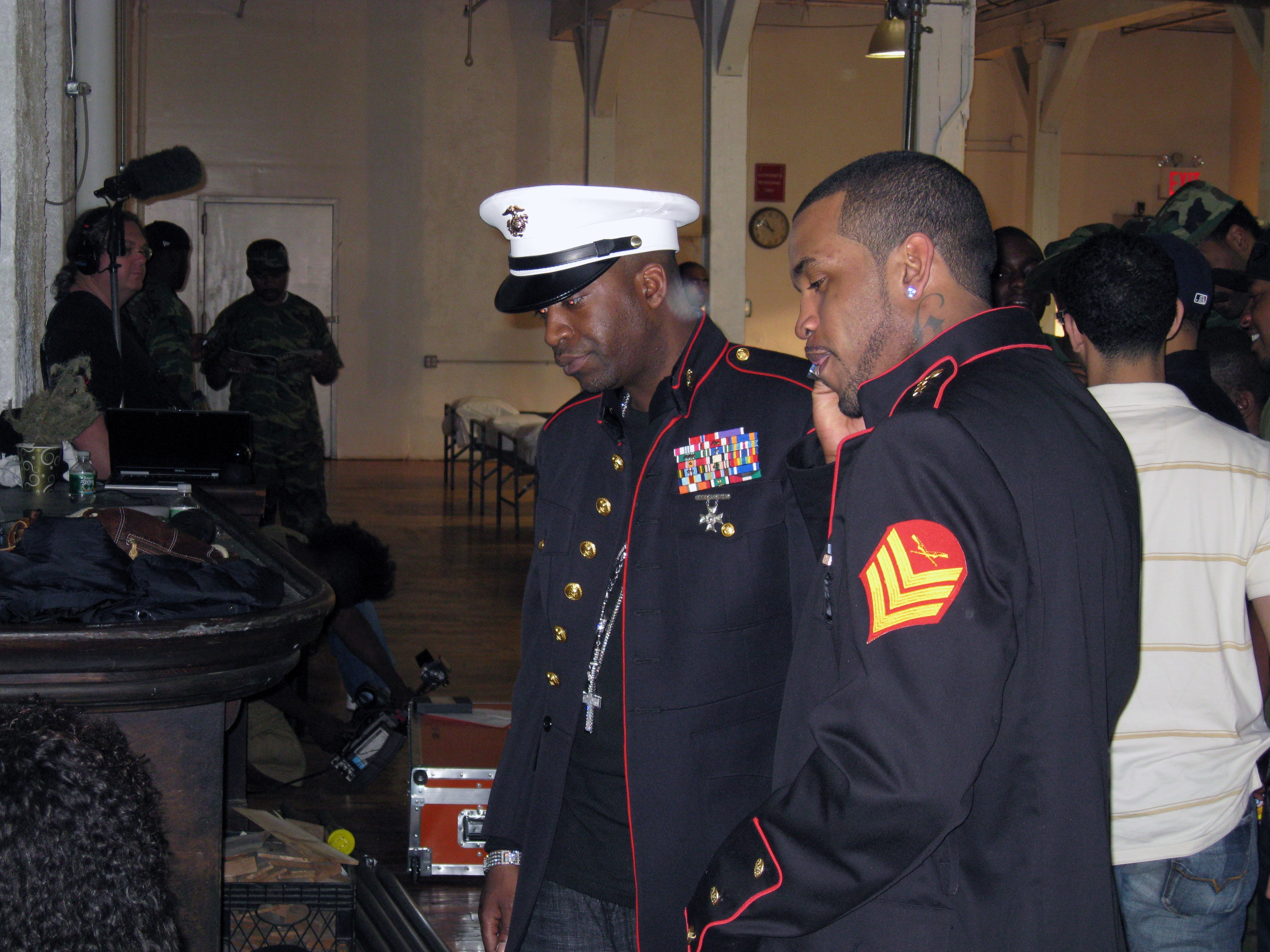
