= Wanna Get to Know You =

Single by G-Unit featuring Joe

from the album Beg for Mercy
- Released: January 13, 2004
- Recorded: 2003
- Genre: Hip hop; R&B
- Length: 4:25
- Label: Interscope; G-Unit
- Songwriters: Curtis Jackson III; Christopher Lloyd; David Brown; Joseph Thomas
- Producer: Red Spyda

G-Unit featuring Joe singles chronology
"Poppin' Them Thangs" (2003)	"Wanna Get to Know You" (2004)	"Ride wit U" (2004)

Joe singles chronology
"More & More" (2003)	"Wanna Get To Know You" (2004)	"Ride wit U" (2004)

Music video
- "Wanna Get To Know You" on YouTube

"Wanna Get to Know You" is a song recorded by G-Unit. It was released in January 2004 through Interscope Records and 50 Cent's G-Unit Records as the third single from their 2003 debut album, Beg for Mercy.

== Background ==
The song was released to radio stations on January 13, 2004. The song features R&B singer Joe, who sings the chorus. The first verse of the song is rapped by Young Buck, followed by Lloyd Banks, and the final verse is rapped by 50 Cent. The song is produced by Red Spyda, and heavily samples Marvin Gaye's song, "Come Live with Me Angel". The song peaked at number 15 on the Billboard Hot 100.

=== Track listing ===
Promo CD single

1. "Wanna Get To Know You" (LP version)
2. "Angels"
3. "Angels" (Instrumental)
4. "Wanna Get To Know You" (Enhanced CD Video)

== Music video ==
The music video's setting(s) change for each verse. G-Unit (Young Buck, The Game, 50 Cent and Lloyd Banks) appears in a backstreet alley throughout the video. Young Buck appears at a bar/club with The Game for his verse, seducing a woman while there. Lloyd Banks is in a taxi cab having sex with a woman while the taxi cab driver looks on for the second verse. 50 Cent is at a beach party and having sex with a woman on the sand for the third and final verse.

== Chart positions ==
=== Weekly charts ===
Chart (2004)	Peak position
Australia (ARIA)	30
Australian Urban (ARIA)	9
CIS Airplay (TopHit)	193
Ireland (IRMA)	34
Netherlands (Single Top 100)	96
New Zealand (Recorded Music NZ)	26
Sweden (Sverigetopplistan)	41
Switzerland (Schweizer Hitparade)	20
UK Singles (Official Charts)	27
UK Hip Hop/R&B (Official Charts)	7
US Billboard Hot 100	15
US Hot R&B/Hip-Hop Songs (Billboard)	10
US Hot Rap Songs (Billboard)	5

=== Year-end charts ===
Chart (2004)	Position
UK Urban (Music Week)	26
US Billboard Hot 100	86
US Hot R&B/Hip-Hop Songs (Billboard)	51

== Release history ==
Region	Date	Format(s)	Label(s)	Ref.
United States	January 26, 2004	Urban contemporary radio	G-Unit, Interscope	
United States	February 2, 2004	Rhythmic contemporary radio	G-Unit, Interscope	
