= G-Unit Radio =

G-Unit Radio may refer to:

- G-Unit Radio, a mixtape series by G-Unit
- G-Unit Radio, a show on Eminem's Shade 45
