= Poppin' Them Thangs =

- Poppin' Them Thangs vinyl cover

Single by G-Unit

from the album Beg for Mercy
- Released: November 4, 2003
- Genre: Gangsta rap
- Length: 4:00
- Label: Interscope; G-Unit
- Songwriters: Curtis Jackson III; Christopher Lloyd; David Brown
- Producers: Dr. Dre; Scott Storch

G-Unit singles chronology
"Stunt 101" (2003)	"Poppin' Them Thangs" (2003)	"Wanna Get to Know You" (2004)

"Poppin' Them Thangs" is a song recorded by G-Unit and produced by Dr. Dre and Scott Storch. It was released in November 2003 through Interscope Records and 50 Cent's G-Unit Records as the second single from their debut album, Beg for Mercy. The first verse of the song is rapped by 50 Cent, followed by Lloyd Banks, and the final verse is rapped by Young Buck.

== Music video ==
A music video was filmed for the song, depicting a meeting at an airport hangar between several organized crime groups, including representatives of the Japanese Yakuza (led by a Japanese gangster played by Al Leong), the New York Mafia, a West Coast biker gang, the Chinese Triad, the Russian Mafia, a Colombian cartel, and G-Unit. The meeting is held to address tensions that have arisen following G-Unit's return after an unspecified absence.

During the meeting, the rival gang leaders criticize 50 Cent for his reckless behavior and flashy lifestyle. In response, 50 argues that while the other organizations have continued to profit and prosper, "the streets" have been neglected, referring to King of New York. He then demands a percentage of each group's criminal earnings. The proposal is met with hostility, and the gang leaders prepare to confront G-Unit. However, additional G-Unit members arrive, including The Game, giving the group a numerical advantage and forcing the other organizations to back down and accept 50's demands.

The video concludes at the offices of Yayo's Trucking Co., where 50 Cent receives a cash payment from an Asian associate. After accepting the money, 50 jokingly tells the man that he should work for him sometime before the associate departs.

The music video on YouTube has received over 198 million views as of March 2026.

== Charts ==
=== Weekly charts ===
Chart (2004)	Peak position
Hungary (Dance Top 40)	33
Ireland (IRMA)	11
Scottish Singles Sales (Official Charts)	12
UK Singles (Official Charts)	10
UK Hip Hop/R&B (Official Charts)	3
US Hot R&B/Hip-Hop Songs (Billboard)	66

=== Year-end charts ===
Chart (2004)	Position
UK Urban (Music Week) "Poppin' Them Thangs" / "If I Can't"	31

== Certifications ==
Region	Certification	Certified units/sales
United Kingdom (BPI)	Silver	200,000^{‡}
^{‡} Sales+streaming figures based on certification alone.
