= Close to Me (G-Unit song) =

Single by G-Unit

from the album T·O·S (Terminate on Sight)
- Released: Aug 13, 2008
- Recorded: 2008
- Genre: Hip hop
- Length: 4:18
- Label: G-Unit; Interscope
- Songwriters: Curtis Jackson; Marvin Bernard; Christopher Lloyd; Teraike Crawford
- Producer: Teraike "Chris Styles" Crawford

G-Unit singles chronology
"Rider Pt. 2" (2008)	"Close to Me" (2008)

"Close to Me" is a song by East Coast hip hop group G-Unit. It was released on August 18, 2008 as the third single from the groups second and final studio album, T·O·S (Terminate on Sight).

== Background ==
Despite T.O.S.: Terminate on Sight doing decent sales G-Unit managed to release a third single. In an interview with G-Unit, Tony Yayo explained the track "Straight Outta Southside" is his favorite track off the album, with "T.O.S. (Terminate on Sight)" being Lloyd Banks' and "Close to Me" being 50 Cent's, hence "Close to Me" being the third single.

Originally "Party Ain't Over" was going to be the fourth and final single, but due to the lack of support from Interscope, a fourth single was never made, which makes "Close To Me" the third and final single from the album.

== Music video ==
The music video premiered on This Is 50. The music video is animated, like the video for "Piggy Bank" and the song "My Buddy".
