= Smile (G-Unit song) =

Single by G-Unit

from the album Beg for Mercy
- Released: April 8, 2004
- Genre: Hip hop
- Length: 3:38
- Label: Interscope; G-Unit
- Songwriters: C. Jackson; C. Lloyd; S. Wright; E. Wilson; C. Roberson
- Producer: No I.D.

G-Unit singles chronology
"Ride wit U" (2004)	"Smile" (2004)	"I Like the Way She Do It" (2008)

"Smile" is a song by American hip hop group G-Unit, released on April 8, 2004, as the fourth and final single from their debut album, Beg for Mercy (2003). The song was produced by No I.D. and contains a sample "I Too Am Wanting", as performed by Syreeta. Smile was neither heavily promoted nor released as a CD single, causing it to chart lowly. Despite this, a music video was filmed.

== Background ==
Lloyd Banks is the main artist on the song, with his G-Unit cohort 50 Cent, only singing "be the reason you smile" as a background vocal on the refrain as well as giving the intro.

== Music video ==
The video goes through Lloyd Banks' life from a child to an adult, as he gets involved in love interests and relationships. It features Banks' two brothers, who play him during his teen years. G-Unit Records artist, Olivia, is the adult girl featured in the video. The video was directed by Jessy Terrero.

== Chart positions ==
Chart (2004)	Peak position
U.S. Billboard Hot R&B/Hip-Hop Songs	72
Irish Singles Chart	34
