= Beg for Mercy =

2003 studio album by G-Unit

Studio album by G-Unit
- Released: November 14, 2003
- Genre: Gangsta rap
- Length: 68:37
- Label: G-Unit; Interscope
- Producer: 50 Cent; 7th EMP; Big-Toni; Black Jeruz; Denaun Porter; DJ Khalil; DJ Twins; Dr. Dre; Eminem; Fusion Unltd; Hi-Tek; Jake One; Luis Resto; Megahertz; Midi Mafia; Needlz; No I.D.; Nottz; Red Spyda; Sam Sneed; Scott Storch; Sha Money XL; Thayod Ausar

G-Unit chronology
God's Plan (2002)	Beg for Mercy (2003)	Terminate on Sight (2008)

Singles from Beg for Mercy
- 1. "Stunt 101" Released: September 23, 2003; 2. "Poppin' Them Thangs" Released: November 4, 2003; 3. "Wanna Get to Know You" Released: January 13, 2004; 4. "Smile" Released: April 8, 2004

Beg for Mercy is the debut studio album by American rap group G-Unit, released through G-Unit Records and Interscope Records. The album was released on November 14, 2003, nine months after 50 Cent's successful debut album Get Rich or Die Tryin'.

For this release, G-Unit was composed of rappers 50 Cent, Lloyd Banks and Young Buck, with support from Tony Yayo, who was an original member of the group but due to his imprisonment in 2002 only appears on two songs. The Game was inducted into the group after recording sessions were finished.

== Background ==
Following a murder attempt and the subsequent industry blacklisting, 50 Cent focused on releasing mixtapes throughout 2002. This allowed him to generate public interest in his music. "At the time, 50's music was inescapable in New York", wrote Complex. Several mixtapes were recorded and released under G-Unit, the group consisting of him and his childhood friends Lloyd Banks and Tony Yayo. His debut mixtape, Guess Who's Back?, reached Eminem. Impressed with the project, Eminem introduced 50 Cent to Dr. Dre and helped him sign a $1 million record deal. In 2003, 50 Cent released his debut album Get Rich or Die Tryin'. By the end of the year, the album sold 12 million copies worldwide and was certified six-times platinum by the Recording Industry Association of America (RIAA). While working on a follow-up album, 50 Cent decided to delay it and instead start production on G-Unit's debut album, Beg for Mercy.

During production on the album, Tony Yayo was sentenced to jail in 2003 on charges of gun possession and bail jumping, and so he makes only two appearances on the entire record, on the tracks "Groupie Love", and "I Smell Pussy". "I Smell Pussy" originally appeared on G-Unit's mixtape "Automatic Gunfire" as the song "U Remind Me of My Bitch", and the mixtape version's outro contained additional disses aimed at Murder Inc. Records; the album version removed the outro's disses. Yayo's image, which is from a photo taken from the photo shoot for Get Rich or Die Tryin', is seen on the brick wall of the album cover as he could not be photographed due to the jail sentence. Around this time, Nashville, Tennessee-based rapper Young Buck, who worked with 50 Cent on the song "Blood Hound" from "Get Rich or Die Tryin'", developed a close working relationship and friendship with G-Unit, resulting in his induction into the group as a temporary replacement for Tony Yayo.

== Release ==
Beg for Mercy was released on November 14, 2003, four days earlier than planned to combat piracy. Due to the rush release, some stores did not receive the album in time. The album was released on the same day as Jay-Z's The Black Album, which was billed as his final album before retirement. Although they had toured together earlier that year, rumors suggested growing tensions between 50 Cent and Jay-Z. The release date change for Beg for Mercy was announced a day after that of The Black Album, which had also suffered from piracy.

Four copies of Beg for Mercy from the first batch contained a golden ticket, redeemable for a diamond-encrusted G-Unit medallion valued at $12,500.

== Commercial performance ==
50 Cent was confident in the commercial performance of Beg for Mercy and planned to set a first-week sale record with it. The album debuted at No. 3 on the Billboard 200 chart with 377,000 copies sold in the first week, behind 2Pac's Tupac: Resurrection and Jay-Z's The Black Album. On the second week, Beg for Mercy peaked at No. 2 with 327,000 more copies sold, and another 193,000 copies sold in the third week. By April 2008, it had sold over 2.7 million units in the U.S. and has since been certified double platinum by the RIAA.

== Critical reception ==
Professional ratings
Aggregate scores
Source	Rating
Metacritic	62/100
Review scores
Source	Rating
AllMusic	3/5 stars
Blender	3/5 stars
E! Online	B
Entertainment Weekly	B
Los Angeles Times	2.5/4 stars
RapReviews	7.5/10
Rolling Stone	3/5 stars
The Village Voice	(dud)
USA Today	3/4 stars

According to the review aggregator Metacritic, Beg for Mercy received "generally favorable reviews" based on a weighted average score of 62 out of 100 from 11 critic scores. Most music critics commended the album's production but criticized the lyrical themes. Opinions were divided on the performances of the G-Unit members. Rolling Stone's Christian Hoard praised the album's "cinematic, bouncy" production, along with the vocal performance of the members of G-Unit. In contrast, Soren Baker, reviewing for Los Angeles Times, commended 50 Cent's "animated, at times sing-song delivery", but panned "the monotone Banks and the supercharged but lyrically bankrupt Buck". Entertainment Weekly's Tom Sinclair thought G-Unit members successfully combine their brash style with a sense of charisma. Steve Juon of RapReviews thought the group members balance each other out. He praised the album, adding that its weak moments are "few and far between".

Many reviewers were dissatisfied with the lyrical content of the album. Summarizing the album, Joe Warminsky of The Washington Post said that its "dullness is deafening, and also contagious", adding that it is "about gangstas who are nearly bored with their alleged success". Comparing Beg for Mercy to 50 Cent's previous projects, Jon Caramanica in a review for Blender said that "50's signature wit is notably absent". Describing the album's lead single "Stunt 101" as a "glamour-happy" song, he believed that it does not represent the rest of the album, which "play[s] like a document of struggle, not a celebration of success". E! Online criticized the album's subject matter, but thought that some of its tracks have "just the right mix of humor and heat".

Marc Lamont Hill, in his review for PopMatters, called Beg for Mercy "one of the strongest albums of the year". He liked the production of the album, but criticized its subject matter and the focus on 50 Cent. The Observer's writer Kitty Empire agreed with him, calling it "50's second de facto album this year". However, she was more critical, calling some of the album's tracks "creatively bankrupt depths" that are "labouring gangsta rap clichés with a total absence of humour, originality or self-awareness" and describing its production as "lazy rip-offs of Dr Dre's style". The album's themes were the main focus of Andy Gill's review for The Independent. "The lyrics to Beg for Mercy read like some grotesque cross between Hustler and Guns & Ammo", wrote the critic.

In a retrospective review, Jason Birchmeier of AllMusic wrote that he views Beg for Mercy as an event, in context of its release alongside Jay-Z's The Black Album, and while "it's not quite as exciting" otherwise, it is still better than other 2003 rap albums. "Beg for Mercy is surprisingly solid, sounding very much like a whole rather than the usual hodgepodge of singles and filler", concluded the journalist.

== Track listing ==
No.	Title	Writer(s)	Producer(s)	Length
1.	"G-Unit"	Curtis Jackson III; Christopher Lloyd; David Brown	Hi-Tek	3:29
2.	"Poppin' Them Thangs"	Jackson; Lloyd; Brown	Dr. Dre; Scott Storch	4:00
3.	"My Buddy"	Jackson; Lloyd; Brown	Thayod Ausar; Eminem; Luis Resto	3:44
4.	"I'm So Hood"	Jackson	DJ Twins; Eminem; Luis Resto	2:25
5.	"Stunt 101"	Jackson; Lloyd; Brown	Mr. Porter	3:52
6.	"Wanna Get to Know You" (featuring Joe)	Jackson; Lloyd; Brown; Joseph Thomas	Red Spyda	4:25
7.	"Groupie Love" (featuring Butch Cassidy)	Jackson; Lloyd; Marvin Bernard; Danny Means II	Midi Mafia	4:14
8.	"Betta Ask Somebody"	Jackson; Lloyd; Brown	Jake One	3:53
9.	"Footprints"	Jackson; Brown	Nottz	4:21
10.	"Eye for Eye"	Jackson; Lloyd; Brown	Hi-Tek	3:55
11.	"Smile"	Jackson; Lloyd	No I.D.	3:38
12.	"Baby U Got"	Jackson; Lloyd; Brown	Megahertz	4:03
13.	"Salute U"	Lloyd; Brown	7th EMP	3:00
14.	"Beg for Mercy"	Jackson; Lloyd; Brown	Sha Money XL; Big-Toni	2:38
15.	"G'd Up"	Jackson; Lloyd; Brown	Dr. Dre	4:47
16.	"Lay You Down"	Jackson; Lloyd; Brown	DJ Khalil	4:03
17.	"Gangsta Shit"	Jackson; Lloyd; Brown	Needlz	4:12
18.	"I Smell Pussy"	Jackson; Lloyd; Bernard	Sam Sneed	3:58
Total length:				70:14

Bonus track
No.	Title	Producer(s)	Length
19.	"Collapse (G-Unit Freestyle)"	Eminem	1:39
Total length:			71:53

Samples

- "G-Unit" contains samples of "Million Dollars" by Triumvirat
- "My Buddy" contains samples of "Agony or Ecstasy?" by Ennio Morricone, and audio excerpts from the film Scarface.
- "Wanna Get to Know You" contains samples of "Come Live with Me Angel" by Marvin Gaye.
- "Groupie Love" contains samples of "Simply Beautiful" by Al Green.
- "Betta Ask Somebody" contains samples of "Blue Leopard" by Pierre-Alain Dahan.
- "Footprints" contains samples of "Walk with Me" by Martha Bass.
- "Eye for Eye" contains samples of "Hello Love" by Eden Raskin.
- "Smile" contains samples of "I Too Am Wanting" by Syreeta
- "Salute U" contains samples of "Brandenburg Concerto #1 in F Major (Allego Moderato)" by Johann Sebastian Bach
- "Beg for Mercy" contains samples of "Back Down" by 50 Cent
- "Lay You Down" contains samples of "Doctor Marvello" by Klaatu
- "I Smell Pussy" contains samples of "The Greatest Sex" by R. Kelly
- "Collapse (G-Unit Freestyle)" contains samples of "'Till I Collapse" by Eminem

== Charts ==
=== Weekly charts ===
Chart (2003–04)	Peak position
Australian Albums (ARIA)	30
Belgian Albums (Ultratop Flanders)	31
Canadian Albums (Billboard)	5
Canadian R&B Albums (Nielsen SoundScan)	1
Dutch Albums (Album Top 100)	38
French Albums (SNEP)	39
German Albums (Offizielle Top 100)	57
Irish Albums (IRMA)	10
Italian Albums (FIMI)	68
New Zealand Albums (RMNZ)	26
Norwegian Albums (VG-lista)	28
Scottish Albums (OCC)	14
Swedish Albums (Sverigetopplistan)	58
Swiss Albums (Schweizer Hitparade)	28
UK Albums (OCC)	13
US Billboard 200	2
US Top R&B/Hip-Hop Albums (Billboard)	2

=== Year-end charts ===
Chart (2003)	Position
UK Albums (OCC)	122
US Billboard 200	185
US Top R&B/Hip-Hop Albums (Billboard)	71
Worldwide Albums (IFPI)	36

Chart (2004)	Position
Dutch Albums (Album Top 100)	97
UK Albums (OCC)	199
US Billboard 200	20
US Top R&B/Hip-Hop Albums (Billboard)	8

== Certifications ==
Region	Certification	Certified units/sales
Canada (Music Canada)	2× Platinum	200,000^{^}
Denmark (IFPI Danmark)	Gold	10,000^{‡}
New Zealand (RMNZ)	Platinum	15,000^{‡}
United Kingdom (BPI)	Platinum	300,000^{*}
United States (RIAA)	2× Platinum	2,000,000^{^}
^{*} Sales figures based on certification alone.^{^} Shipments figures based on certification alone.^{‡} Sales+streaming figures based on certification alone.
