= T.O.S. (Terminate on Sight) =

Terminate on Sight

Studio album by G-Unit
- Released: July 1, 2008
- Recorded: 2007–2008
- Genres: Hip hop; gangsta rap
- Length: 58:42
- Labels: G-Unit; Interscope
- Producers: 50 Cent (exec.); Damien Taylor; Dangerous LLC; Don Cannon; Dual Output; Jake One; Ky Miller; Rick Rock; Ron Browz; Street Radio; Swizz Beatz; Tha Bizness; Ty Fyffe

G-Unit chronology
Beg for Mercy (2003)	Terminate on Sight (2008)	The Beauty of Independence (2014)

Singles from Terminate on Sight
- 1. "I Like the Way She Do It" Released: April 22, 2008; 2. "Rider Pt. 2" Released: April 22, 2008; 3. "Close to Me" Released: August 13, 2008

T.O.S. (Terminate on Sight) is the second and final studio album by rap group G-Unit. It was the group's first album in five years since their previous album, Beg for Mercy. The title of the album was originally announced to be Shoot to Kill and then Lock & Load, with the eventual name being Terminate on Sight. The album was originally scheduled to be released on June 24, 2008, but was rescheduled to July 1.

== Concept ==
The album's title has been acknowledged by HipHopDX who said "As the title suggests, they aren't exactly aiming for joy." In an interview with MTV, Tony Yayo revealed the reason behind the title saying that it "describes the aggressiveness."

50 Cent commented on the method of songwriting and recording that the group are using. He said:

We ran through 18 records. But what I was doing at that point was I was allowing them to make the same effort that they would make for mixtape material, for the album. So we’ll put portions of that material that were made during that time span on the actual street. It’s not going to do anything but build momentum.

In another interview with MTV, 50 Cent spoke about the album. He said:

It's like a spinoff – the sequel to Beg for Mercy. It was a statement towards the competition, towards other artists. Terminate on Sight is the version where you get more aggressive. This record embodies that. I kinda know where I need to go, because I tested the waters with the material I put out. I get to tell with the response to certain records where I need to be and chill out from other stuff.

In an interview, Lloyd Banks talked about the album, calling it "aggressive" and a "good album for hip-hop".

== Music ==
=== Recording ===
During an interview, Spider Loc mentioned that G-Unit had recorded seventy to eighty tracks which could have appeared on the album. However, in a later interview with AllHipHop.com, G-Unit stated that there were eighteen possible tracks which could have made the final album.

Terminate on Sight promotional posters.

In an interview with MTV, 50 Cent spoke about the steps before release. He said:

We gotta work with Em, that's it. Then we can be done with it. Production-wise, I captured what I needed. But I didn't want to not have Em's stamp on it. Before my work goes to the public, it has to pass the Eminem test, the Dr. Dre test – it's a few tests before we push them to the street. That's why they can expect a higher quality of music than from the usual artist.

In an interview with ReverbNation, Lloyd Banks commented on the work ethic whilst recording the album. He said:

We were in the studio pushing each other. Literally by the time I got a verse done, Yayo would have his verse done. We’re damn near fighting to get in the booth. That’s what was missing. And it comes from feeling resistance for the first time. I look at it as a blessing, because it’s brought us back to where we started. Back to why we made music in the first place, and why people took a liking to it. People look at the success part and think it’s an accident. I want the fans and the critics to know first off, as much success that we’ve had, it never overshadowed the love and respect that we’ve had for the game. The love drives us.

In an interview, Tony Yayo spoke about a track featuring Eminem, which is produced by Dr. Dre. He said:

"The track with Em is raw. Him And Fif are gonna kill someone's career with that, but I'll keep that to myself right now. I don't think ya'll gonna be ready for this track. I think it might push this nigga to kill himself when he hears this."

However this did not materialize.

=== Production ===
Tony Yayo stated that the Timbaland and Swizz Beatz tracks are his "favorites", quoting them as "the standout tracks". Tony Yayo has also confirmed that Ron Browz has produced for the album. In an interview with HipHopGame, G-Unit also stated that production was provided by some relatively new producers.

== Reception ==
Professional ratings
Aggregate scores
Source	Rating
Metacritic	45/100
Review scores
Source	Rating
AllMusic	3.5/5 stars
The A.V. Club	D
Billboard	(favorable)
Blender	3/5 stars
Now	2/5 stars
PopMatters	2/10 stars
RapReviews	(6/10)
Rolling Stone	1.5/5 stars
Smooth	4/5 stars
Uncut	3/5 stars

T.O.S: Terminate on Sight received mixed reviews from music critics. At Metacritic, it has been given a score of 45 out of 100 based on 10 "mixed or average reviews".

The track "Straight Outta Southside" is a tribute to Sean Bell who was killed by police in New York City. The song features elements from N.W.A's track entitled "Straight Outta Compton".

AllHipHop noted the aggressiveness on "Straight Outta Southside" quoting Lloyd Banks' lines:

Fuck tha Police with a HIV Carrier
No Vaseline and an M-16

They also called "Kitty Kat" and "I Like the Way She Do It" "Down right awful". AllMusic praised the lyrics on the album citing lyrics from the track "Piano Man":

I'm a work of art

A ghetto version of Mozart
I move the keys

They call me the Piano Man

They also positively commented on Tony Yayo's style saying "Yayo has never sounded so good, stepping his game up with a faster and more urgent style dropping wittier lines", citing his lyrics on the title track, "I kick Game like Pele and Beckham".

ReverbNation have noted that "No Days Off" features a funky 1964 style baseline whilst maintaining the use of synthesized effects and have described it as "Instant riding music". Similarly, they have said that "Kitty Kat" features an "irresistible island-flavored flow" whilst "The Piano Man" is dark and sardonic. MTV stated that "The Party Ain't Over" is reminiscent of "I Get Money", and denounces talk of the group's demise.

HipHopDX gave the album 2/5 calling "I Like the Way She Do It" "nothing short of embarrassing" Nevertheless, they praised several tracks, calling "You So Tough" "easily the best track on the album" and praising "I Don't Wanna Talk About It" for its "Dope production". They also commented on the track "Ready Or Not" calling it "nice and menacing" and "the way the album should sound". UGO gave it a B and called it "a satisfying G-Unit release." Okayplayer gave it a favorable review and said, "The album lacks the soul and introspection that endear audiences to even the most hardened villain. There’s no remorse here; no second guessing themselves. Just day in, day out thugging, slinging, shooting and screwing. The members of G-Unit have elected to portray themselves as inhumane to the nth degree. And for the opportunity, they’d like to thank God." Artistdirect gave it four stars out of five and said, " G-Unit have effectively found the balance between sex and war, and they're about [to] terminate the competition with extreme prejudice."

IGN gave it a 7.6 out of 10 and said that the group did a "stellar job of picking beats" DefSounds gave the album a 7.5 out of 10 and praised all its aspects, agreeing with IGN and calling the production "up tempo, gritty, rough but enjoyable" and commenting on the lyrics saying "the constant subliminals, catchy punchlines and the funny insults add to the enjoyment of the album". They note that the same subject matter is used throughout the album, however, saying the combination of "hot production, witty lyrics and constant disses" makes the tough talk "a success". They concluded by saying

From start to finish this album offers energy, aggression, tough talk, and a bravado that only a member of G-Unit could embody. You'll be hard pressed to find someone who can hear this album and not find at least 5 songs that they like. This album is definitely a keeper

== Commercial performance ==
T.O.S. (Terminate on Sight) debuted at number four on the US Billboard 200 with sales of 102,000 copies in its first week.

== Track listing ==
Credits adapted from the album's liner notes.

No.	Title	Writer(s)	Producer(s)	Length
1.	"Straight Outta Southside"	Curtis Jackson; Marvin Bernard; Christopher Lloyd; Rondell Turner	Ron Browz	2:36
2.	"Piano Man" (featuring Young Buck)	Jackson; Bernard; Lloyd; David Brown; Justin Henderson; Christopher Whitacre	Tha Bizness	3:21
3.	"Close to Me"	Jackson; Bernard; Lloyd; Teraike Crawford	Teraike "Chris Styles" Crawford	4:18
4.	"Rider Pt. 2" (featuring Young Buck)	Jackson; Bernard; Lloyd; Brown; Ricardo Thomas	Rick Rock	2:48
5.	"Casualties of War"	Jackson; Bernard; Lloyd; Kyeme Miller	Ky Miller	3:19
6.	"You So Tough"	Jackson; Bernard; Lloyd; Miller; Anand Bakshi; R. D. Burman	Ky Miller	3:46
7.	"No Days Off" (featuring Young Buck)	Jackson; Bernard; Lloyd; Ryan Frazier; Richard Ahlert; Jean-Claude Massoulier; André Charles Jean Popp	Dual Output	3:54
8.	"T.O.S."	Jackson; Bernard; Lloyd; Tyrone Fyffe	Ty Fyffe	4:11
9.	"I Like the Way She Do It" (featuring Young Buck)	Jackson; Bernard; Lloyd; Brown; Jesse Matthews; Kendred Smith	Street Radio	3:52
10.	"Kitty Kat"	Jackson; Bernard; Lloyd; Chauncey Hollis	Hit-Boy	3:48
11.	"Party Ain't Over" (featuring Young Buck)	Jackson; Bernard; Lloyd; Brown; Damien Taylor	Damien Taylor	3:30
12.	"Let it Go" (featuring Mavado)	Jackson; Bernard; Lloyd; Don Cannon; David Constantine Brooks; Antônio Candeia Filho	Don Cannon	3:06
13.	"Get Down"	Jackson; Bernard; Lloyd; Kasseem Dean; David Clayton-Thomas	Swizz Beatz	3:47
14.	"I Don't Wanna Talk About It"	Lloyd; Bernard; Jesse Wilson	Jesse “Corparal” Wilson	4:34
15.	"Ready or Not"	Lloyd; Bernard; Dutton	Jake One	3:38
16.	"Money Make the World Go Round"	Bernard; Lloyd; Turner	Ron Browz	4:14

iTunes bonus track
No.	Title	Producer(s)	Length
17.	"Chase Da Cat"	Sean «The Chase»; Kadis	3:42

- Young Buck is credited as a featured artist as he was not a G Unit member anymore at the time of the album's release.

=== Credited samples ===
- "You So Tough" – contains elements from "Pahle, Pahle Pyar Ki Mulaqaten" (Bakshi/Burman). Saregama Music United States BMI (admin by the Royalty Network, Inc.) Used by permission. Performed by Bappi Lahiri and Anjaan. Used courtesy of Saregama, Ltd by arrangement with The Royalty, Inc.
- "No Days Off" – contains elements from "On N Oublie Jamias" aka "Dawn of Our Love" (Ahlert/Massoulier/Pop) EMI Blackwood Music, Inc./Bagtelle Societe (BMI). Used by permission. Performed by Herb Ohta & His Orchestra. Used courtesy of Universal Music Enterprises.
- "Let It Go" – contains elements from "Preciso Me Encontrar" (Filho). Universal Music-MGB Songs (ASCAP). Used by permission. Performed by Cartola. Used courtesy of EMI Brazil Records, Under license from EMI Music Marketing.
- "Get Down" – contains elements from "Spinning Wheel" (Clayton-Smith). EMI Blackwood Music, Inc./Bay Music, Inc. (BMI). Used by permission. Performed by Blood, Sweat & Tears. Used courtesy of Sony BMG Music Entertainment.

== Personnel ==
- Producers – Swizz Beatz, Ron Browz, Tha Bizness, Rick Rock, Ty Fyffe, Polow da Don, Don Cannon, Jake One, Special edition DVD edited by Timothy "cyphaman" Hannah Jr. Dangerous LLC, Dual Output, Ky Miller, Street Radio, Damien Taylor
- Mixing – Pat Viala, Steve Baughman
- Guitar/bass – Daniel Groover

== Charts ==
=== Weekly charts ===
Chart (2008)	Peak position
Australian Albums (ARIA)	35
Austrian Albums (Ö3 Austria)	44
Belgian Albums (Ultratop Flanders)	46
Belgian Albums (Ultratop Wallonia)	96
Canadian Albums (Billboard)	4
Dutch Albums (Album Top 100)	65
French Albums (SNEP)	61
German Albums (Offizielle Top 100)	54
Irish Albums (IRMA)	35
New Zealand Albums (RMNZ)	37
Scottish Albums (Official Charts)	53
Swiss Albums (Schweizer Hitparade)	25
UK Albums (Official Charts)	39
US Billboard 200	4
US Top R&B/Hip-Hop Albums (Billboard)	2
US Top Rap Albums (Billboard)	2

=== Year-end charts ===
Chart (2008)	Position
US Billboard 200	188
US Top R&B/Hip-Hop Albums (Billboard)	52
