= The Beauty of Independence =

EP by G-Unit
- Released: August 25, 2014
- Recorded: 2014
- Genre: Hip-hop
- Length: 21:28
- Label: G-Unit
- Producer: Havoc; Lord Quest; Ky Miller; 45 Music; Ryan “Ryu” Alexy; D.K.A.D; Viruss Beats

G-Unit chronology
T.O.S. (Terminate on Sight) (2008)	The Beauty of Independence (2014)	The Beast Is G Unit (2015)

The Beauty of Independence is the first extended play (EP) by American hip hop group G-Unit. It was released for digital download on August 25, 2014, and includes six previously unreleased songs.

Professional ratings
Review scores
Source	Rating
HipHopDX	4/5 stars
XXL	4/5 (XL)

== Commercial performance ==
The album debuted at number 17 on the Billboard 200 chart, with first-week sales of 14,472 copies in the United States.

== Track listing ==
Credits adapted from the album's liner notes.

No.	Title	Writer(s)	Producer(s)	Length
1.	"Watch Me"	Kejuan Muchita; Kal Delaportas; Chris Patilis; Curtis Jackson; Marvin Bernard; Curtis Stewart; Christopher Lloyd; David Brown	Havoc	3:24
2.	"I Don't Fuck with You"	Rodolfo Rodriguez; Mark Gonzales; Jeffrey Nuamah; Jackson; Bernard; Stewart; Brown	Lord Quest; Ky Miller (add.)	3:24
3.	"Digital Scale"	Ronald Richardson; Jackson; Bernard; Stewart; Brown; Adrian Younge; Loren Oden	45 Music	4:16
4.	"Dead a Pussy Nigga"	Ryan Alexy; David Kovacs; Jackson; Bernard; Stewart; Lloyd; Brown	Ryan “Ryu” Alexy; D.K.A.D	3:08
5.	"Changes"	Alexy; Jackson; Bernard; Stewart; Lloyd; Brown	Ryan “Ryu” Alexy	4:07
6.	"The Plug"	Erik Gamzoyan; Jackson; Bernard; Stewart; Lloyd; Brown	Viruss Beats	3:22

Best Buy Bonus Tracks
No.	Title	Producer(s)	Length
7.	"Ease Up"	Ky Miller	4:14
8.	"Big Body Benz"	Ky Miller	4:37

Sample credits

- "I Don't Fuck with You" contains replayed elements from "Juan Tenorio", written by Rodolfo Rodriguez and Mark Gonzales.
- "Digital Scale" contains elements from "Turn Down the Sound", written by Adrian Younge and Loren Oden, performed by Adrian Younge.

== Charts ==
=== Weekly charts ===
Chart (2014)	Peak position
US Billboard 200	17
US Digital Albums (Billboard)	6
US Independent Albums (Billboard)	3
US Top R&B/Hip-Hop Albums (Billboard)	5
US Top Rap Albums (Billboard)	3

=== Year-end charts ===
Chart (2014)	Position
US Top R&B/Hip-Hop Albums (Billboard)	93
