= The Beast Is G Unit =

EP by G-Unit
- Released: March 3, 2015
- Recorded: 2014–15
- Genre: Hip hop
- Length: 22:23
- Label: G-Unit
- Producers: G Koop; Honorable C.N.O.T.E.; Illmind; Jake One; Ky Miller; MistrAdams; Swiff D; Chris Major

G-Unit chronology
| The Beauty of Independence (2014) | The Beast Is G Unit (2015) |

The Beast Is G Unit is the second and final extended play (EP) by American hip hop group G-Unit. The EP was released on March 3, 2015, by G-Unit Records.

== Critical reception ==
Professional ratings
Review scores
| Source | Rating |
|---|---|
| Allmusic | 3/5 stars |
| HipHopDX | 3.5/5 stars |
| XXL | (XL) |

The Beast Is G Unit received positive reviews from music critics. Homer Johnsen of HipHopDX said, "The G-Unit sound has changed for the better. There is no one specific musical style that they emulate, which is both refreshing, and interesting from a critical standpoint. In just over six months, the Unit has released two major EPs, while shaking off the rust and deciding on a new direction. Everybody shows up, and 50 doesn’t steal the spotlight. The Beast is G-Unit is a solid EP with the potential to inspire an equally effective studio LP. If 2014 was any indication, G-Unit won’t be settling down anytime soon." Dan Rys of XXL said, "But if you’re craving some new G-Unit, the EP will satisfy that urge. There’s plenty of 50 Cent menace, Young Buck grit, Tony Yayo wildness and Lloyd Banks lyricism in these bars, while Kidd Kidd acquits himself well throughout. The production doesn’t follow the cut-and-paste, ratchet bounce sound that coats the hip-hop landscape around them, making the project stand out sonically from the pack."

== Commercial performance ==
The EP debuted at number 27 on the Billboard 200, selling 18,542 copies in its first week.

== Track listing ==
Credits adapted from the album's liner notes.

| No. | Title | Writer(s) | Producer(s) | Length |
|---|---|---|---|---|
| 1. | "Ballin'" | Curtis Jackson; Marvin Bernard; Curtis Stewart; Christopher Lloyd; David Brown; Sebastian Adams | MistrAdams | 4:33 |
| 2. | "I'm Grown" | Jackson; Stewart; Lloyd; Brown; Carlton Mays | Honorable C.N.O.T.E. | 4:08 |
| 3. | "Bring My Bottles" | Brown; Jackson; Steve Thornton | Swiff D | 3:14 |
| 4. | "Doper Than My Last One" | Lloyd; Kyeme Miller; Matthew Katsikas | Ky Miller | 3:24 |
| 5. | "Boy Boy" | Jackson; Bernard; Stewart; Brown; Ramon Ibanga; Robert Mandell; Jacob Dutton | Illmind; G Koop; Jake One | 4:09 |
| 6. | "Choose One" | Bernard; Stewart; Lloyd; Brown; Miller; Adam Feeney | Ky Miller | 2:55 |

== Charts ==
=== Weekly charts ===
| Chart (2015) | Peak position |
|---|---|
| US Billboard 200 | 27 |
| US Digital Albums (Billboard) | 15 |
| US Independent Albums (Billboard) | 2 |
| US Top R&B/Hip-Hop Albums (Billboard) | 3 |
| US Top Rap Albums (Billboard) | 3 |

=== Year-end charts ===
| Chart (2015) | Peak position |
|---|---|
| US Top R&B/Hip-Hop Albums (Billboard) | 86 |
