= God's Plan (album) =

Mixtape by G-Unit
- Released: November 1, 2002
- Recorded: Late 2002
- Genre: East Coast hip hop; hardcore hip hop; gangsta rap
- Length: 40:27
- Label: BCD Music Group
- Producer: DJ Whoo Kid; Sha Money XL; Dr. Dre

50 Cent chronology
No Mercy, No Fear (2002)	God's Plan (2002)	Get Rich or Die Tryin' (2003)

G Unit chronology
No Mercy, No Fear (2002)	God's Plan (2002)	Automatic Gunfire (2003)

Professional ratings
Review scores
Source	Rating
RapReviews	7.5/10
Spin	2.5/5 stars

God's Plan is the third mixtape by hip hop group G-Unit, released on November 1, 2002. Originally released independently as a free mixtape, it was re-released in 2006 by BCD Music Group. The remix of Missy Elliott's song "Work It", from her album Under Construction, which features 50 Cent, is included in the mixtape. Also the track "Niggas" featuring 2 verses from The Notorious B.I.G. from his posthumous album, Born Again, on the song of the same name was featured on the soundtrack of the film Bad Boys II in 2003. The World's verse was used in the remix to "Cry Me a River" by Justin Timberlake.

God's Plan was released during 50 Cent's and G-Unit's 2002 mixtape run and is the last mixtape released before 50 Cent's official debut album, Get Rich or Die Tryin' (2003). According to Billboard magazine, the mixtapes caused "tremendous buzz amongst hip-hop fans and artists". Vancouver Sun wrote that the mixtapes "widely circulated" for several years after the release. By rapping over instrumentals from other artists and then releasing it for free, with God's Plan and the other contemporary releases 50 Cent revolutionized hip hop mixtapes, creating a blueprint for later artists, such as Lil Wayne, Young Jeezy, and Drake. God's Plan was named the 9th best mixtape ever by XXL magazine.

== Track listing ==
#	Title	Length	Performer(s)	Samples
1	"Words from Eminem"	0:22	Eminem	
2	"Catch Me in the Hood"	3:43	G-Unit	"8 Mile" by Eminem
3	"You're Not Ready"	3:16	G-Unit	"The Truth" by Beanie Sigel
4	"Gangsta'd Up"	3:04	G-Unit	G'd Up by Tha Eastsidaz (featuring Butch Cassidy)
5	"If Dead Men Could Talk"	3:01	50 Cent	"My Downfall" by The Notorious B.I.G.
6	"Banks Workout Pt. 2"	3:13	50 Cent and Lloyd Banks	Don't Look Now by Outsidaz
7	"Crazy"	2:24	50 Cent	Just Don't Stop by Bathgate & Fabolous
8	"187 Yayo"	3:33	50 Cent and Tony Yayo	"Deep Cover by Dr. Dre and Snoop Dogg
9	"The World"	2:24	Governor and 50 Cent	The World Is Filled... by Biggie feat Too Short and Puff Daddy
10	"Short Stay"	2:23	50 Cent and Lloyd Banks	If I Could Go by Angie Martinez Feat. Lil' Mo & Sacario
11	"Minds Playing Tricks"	1:26	Tony Yayo	"Mind Playing Tricks on Me" by Geto Boys
12	"Niggas"	3:31	The Notorious B.I.G. (featuring 50 Cent & Eminem)	"Niggas" by The Notorious B.I.G.
13	"Tainted"	2:22	50 Cent and Tony Yayo	Tainted by Slum Village & Dwele
14	"Ching Ching Ching"	2:11	50 Cent and Tony Yayo	"Ching Ching" by Ms. Jade (featuring Timbaland and Nelly Furtado)
15	"Work It (Remix)"	4:54	Missy Elliott (featuring 50 Cent)	

== Personnel ==
Lists of the personnel it is confirmed on AllMusic.

- 50 Cent — Primary Artist
- Governor — Primary Artist
- G-Unit — Primary Artist
- Missy — Primary Artist
