= Young Buck =

American rapper (born 1980)

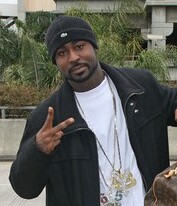
- Young Buck in 2010

Background information
- Also known as: Hoodphame; Buck Marley; Bonafide Hustler
- Born: David Darnell Brown; March 15, 1981 (age 45); Nashville, Tennessee, U.S.
- Genres: Southern hip-hop; crunk; gangsta rap
- Occupations: Rapper; songwriter
- Years active: 1999–present
- Labels: Cashville; Real Talk; E1; Interscope (former); G-Unit
- Formerly of: G-Unit; UTP

David Darnell Brown (born March 15, 1981), better known by his stage name Young Buck, is an American rapper. He was affiliated with Birdman's Cash Money Records in 1997, formed the hip-hop collective UTP with Juvenile and Soulja Slim in 2000, and joined 50 Cent's group, G-Unit by 2003. In 2003, he signed with 50 Cent's G-Unit Records, an imprint of Interscope Records to release his debut studio album Straight Outta Cashville (2004) and its follow-up Buck the World (2007), both of which peaked at number three on the Billboard 200 and were met with critical praise.

Initially launched in 2005 as "G-Unit South", Brown's record label, Cashville Records, has released his subsequent projects following personal disputes with 50 Cent and his 2010 departure from G-Unit Records. Cashville has also signed hip-hop acts including The Outlawz and C-Bo.

== Early life ==
Brown was born in Nashville, Tennessee and grew up in North Nashville. Around the age of 12, he began rapping. A few years later, he performed for Brian "Baby" Williams, co-founder of Cash Money.

== Career ==
Young Buck began his affiliation with Cash Money in 1997 but left for Juvenile's UTP in 2000. He released two albums with UTP, Born to Be a Thug and The Compilation, before leaving the label in 2003 to join 50 Cent's record label G-Unit.

His first recording with G-Unit Records was on the 2002 recorded song Blood Hound for 50 Cent's February 2003 debut studio album Get Rich or Die Tryin'. That same year, Young Buck became a member of G-Unit. He also appeared heavily on rap group G-Unit's 2003 album Beg for Mercy. He replaced G-Unit member Tony Yayo who had been jailed on gun possession charges after recording only two songs for the album.

His G-Unit Records debut album Straight Outta Cashville was released on August 24, 2004. The album's title alludes to the N.W.A album Straight Outta Compton and is a neologism for Nashville (his hometown). The album produced three singles: "Let Me In", "Shorty Wanna Ride", and "Look at Me Now". The album received little promotion after November. Young Buck was arrested for assault after the VIBE award incident and wasn't able to promote the album for four months until the case was dropped. The album debuted at number three on the Billboard 200 and has since been certified Platinum by the RIAA. His second solo album Buck The World followed in 2007.

He joined the rest of the label's roster on the 2005 collaboration album Get Rich or Die Tryin'.

In April 2008 he was expelled from the rap group G Unit, remaining with G Unit Records as a solo artist. 50 Cent faulted him for making provocative public statements he would later retract in private, for missing recording sessions, and for drug abuse. Young Buck released a "diss" track insulting 50 Cent and G Unit, 50 Cent responded by releasing a taped phone call in which an emotional Buck was heard crying and asking 50 Cent for help and advice, Buck replied with another "diss" track.

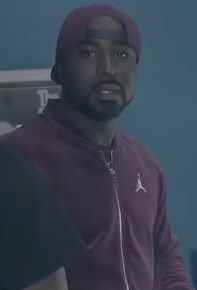
Young Buck in 2018

In October he wished to leave G Unit Records but still owed the label two albums and his third album The Rehab was still unreleased. In 2009 he said he still owed one album, The Rehab was released independently in 2010.

In December 2011 he was still under contract to G-Unit Records and about to lose his assets including his stage name in bankruptcy court, having been unable to record since 2008. He claimed he was close to signing with Cash Money; The Tennessean confirmed a proposed deal that would release him from his G-Unit contract and leave him signed to Cash Money. Cash Money Records CEO Birdman though denied that any deal was in the works.

In August 2012, Buck stated in an interview with XXL he was no longer signed to G-Unit Records and he would be a free agent when he is released from prison.

On June 1, 2014, Young Buck was seen at the Summer Jam Concert with 50 Cent, Lloyd Banks, and Tony Yayo. It was confirmed later that the group had reformed, adding Kidd Kidd as a new member. The group released their debut EP The Beauty of Independence on August 25, 2014. Young Buck is again making new music with G-Unit and released his mixtape Before The Beast which contains seven songs featuring Kidd Kidd, Lil Boosie, Tony Yayo, Lloyd Banks and additional artists. After releasing the mixtape, he released G-unit's second EP The Beast Is G-Unit, which sold approximately 20,000 copies in its first week.

== Personal life ==
=== Shooting ===
In 2000, Young Buck was shot multiple times during a home invasion at his home in Nashville. The assailants were in search of narcotics. Buck required a blood transfusion at Vanderbilt hospital as a result of the life-threatening injuries.

=== Financial problems ===
Brown filed for Chapter 13 bankruptcy protection in August, 2010 shortly after an IRS raid on his home. His bankruptcy lawyer later told The City Paper that he was planning to sue Curtis Jackson (50 Cent) and other parties over the record contract dispute.

The IRS made plans to auction off Young Buck's seized property on October 28, 2010, but his legal counsel filed suit to halt the sale, while simultaneously re-filing a revised bankruptcy petition that no longer referenced a $5 million legal claim against 50 Cent and other parties associated with G Unit.

In the lawsuit, Young Buck said the studio equipment taken in the raid was "directly tied to" his "ability to generate income in order to reorganize the estate." He stated that the seizure of property that belonged to his children had "created great stress in the home" and "within the common law marriage of the debtor plaintiff." He told the court he needed to get back the property belonging to the family.

Young Buck's attorney was able to convince the court that he would be selling real estate worth $638,500 to begin paying the back taxes due. At a hearing on October 26, 2010, plans for the IRS auction were at least temporarily stopped. Young Buck announced the outcome with a tweet.

Young Buck was under Chapter 7, Young Buck's assets were to be sold and distributed among his creditors.

On July 25 and 26, a public auction was held at the estate that Young Buck owns. Property to be sold includes watches, a 50 Cent plaque, artwork, a soda machine, his studio equipment, and more.

=== Drive-by shooting ===
Early Sunday morning on March 4, 2012, Young Buck was targeted in a drive-by shooting. According to Nashville police, via WSMV-TV Channel 4, at approximately 3:30 am, a white Chevrolet Tahoe crept past the rapper's SUV and opened fire, hitting the vehicle 11 times, including a female passenger. Buck, who was back in his hometown to work on new music, was not injured.

After a couple of days of silence, Buck took to his Twitter to address the situation. "We all go through things in life", he tweeted. "The things I'm experiencing are Truly making me a Better and Stronger man. #GodisGood."

=== Legal issues ===
After an IRS raid on Buck's Nashville home in 2010, authorities found a .40 caliber Glock 22 as well as ammunition. The raid followed reports that the rapper had an outstanding $300,000 tax debt, and because he's a convicted felon, Buck is prohibited from possessing any firearms. Back in 2005, he pleaded no contest to assault with a chance to produce bodily injury after he stabbed a man while trying to defend Dr. Dre at the 2004 Vibe Awards.

On July 13, 2012, Buck was sentenced to 18 months in prison on weapon charges, a sentence that he began on August 6, 2012. Until then, Buck had remained at his Nashville home on house arrest with a monitoring bracelet strapped around his ankle. He served his 18 months in Yazoo City Low Security Federal Prison in Southern Mississippi and was released on October 1, 2013.

On July 20, 2016, he sent a threatening text to his ex-girlfriend and showed up and kicked down her door. Buck was arrested on July 21, 2016, for threatening to burn down the ex-girlfriend's apartment. He was released on a $5,000 bond.

== Controversy ==
=== VIBE Awards stabbing ===
On November 15, 2004, Jimmy James Johnson approached Dr. Dre at the VIBE Awards and reportedly asked for an autograph before Dr. Dre was about to go on stage. After Dr. Dre declined, Johnson punched him on the back of the head before running towards the nearest exit. A brawl ensued with several uniformed police officers attempting to break up the fight. Chairs were thrown, and it was alleged that Young Buck stabbed Johnson in the chest with a knife. After video evidence was uncovered from the awards ceremony, the Santa Monica Police Department issued an arrest warrant for him. In a preliminary hearing, it was ruled that there was enough evidence to proceed with a jury trial. However, in December 2005, a deal was reportedly struck that would see Young Buck avoid trial. Young Buck later pleaded no contest to a charge of "assault likely to produce great bodily harm," and was sentenced to three years' probation and 80 hours of community service.

=== The Game ===
After The Game was kicked out of G-Unit allegedly for being disloyal, Young Buck as well as new West Coast G-Unit rapper Spider Loc who had signed to G-Unit Records in September 2004, called him to task for dissing the group and label. The Game then released a track entitled "300 Bars" which insulted both Spider Loc and Young Buck. Young Buck then released a track called "The Real Bitch Boy", which featured Spider Loc and used a beat from The Game's track, "Where I'm From". In the song, Young Buck talks about how he did not even know The Game when he mentions The Game's name on "Poppin' Them Thangs". Also, Young Buck talks about The Game being a male stripper and also how 50 Cent helped The Game to be successful with his album The Documentary.

The feud has continued to escalate, with there being an exchange of many tracks. In February 2007, The Game and Young Buck got into a non-physical altercation at a club, during the NBA All-Star Weekend in Las Vegas. The last time that they were seen together was when The Game was part of G-Unit.

After being dismissed from G-Unit, Young Buck appeared on a remix to The Game's song "Game's Pain", as well as appearing in the music video to the song "My Life", which featured another former rival, Lil Wayne. A mixtape by The Game and Young Buck was also confirmed, called "Worth More Than 50 Cents".

== Albums ==
=== Straight Outta Cashville ===
After being with G-Unit for a little over a year, Young Buck released his debut album, Straight Outta Cashville, a portmanteau reflecting the name of Young Buck's home city, Nashville, Tennessee.

Straight Outta Cashville has been certified double platinum by the Recording Industry Association of America with over 2 million sales in the U.S. and 3.3 million Worldwide.

=== Buck the World ===
Young Buck's second album, Buck the World was released worldwide on March 27, 2007.

Buck the World debuted at No. 3 on the Billboard 200 and No. 1 on the Top R&B/Hip-Hop Albums chart with sales of 141,083 in the first week.

=== The Rehab ===
The Rehab was released on September 7, 2010. It was Buck's third studio album, released independently by Real Talk Entertainment. Buck had made an earlier claim in which he said that The Rehab would sell a million copies in his first week, though he was still signed to G-Unit/Interscope Records at that time.

== Discography ==
=== Studio albums ===
- Straight Outta Cashville (2004)
- Buck the World (2007)

=== With G-Unit ===
- Beg for Mercy (2003)
- T.O.S. (Terminate on Sight) (2008)
- The Beauty of Independence (2014)
- The Beast Is G-Unit (2015)

== Filmography ==
Film
Year	Film	Role	Notes
2003	Doggy Fizzle Televizzle	Himself	Episode 8
2004	Groupie Love	Himself	Pornographic video documentary
2006	Loyalty & Respect	Smoke	
2007	Wild 'n Out	Team Captain/performer	Season 4
2009	Sonicsgate	Performer	"Dead Wrong"
2009	A Billion Bucks	Himself	Video documentary
2009	Kill the Record Labels	Himself	Video documentary
2011	Beef: Behind the Bullet	Himself	Video documentary
2011	E! Buzz with Carla B	Himself	
2013	Buck Mentality	Himself	Video documentary
2019	No Warning		Lead role

== Awards and nominations ==
Year	Nominee / work	Award	Result
2004	G-Unit	BET Awards – BET Award for Best Group	Nominated
2004	G-Unit	Soul Train Music Awards – Best R&B/Soul or Rap New Artist	Nominated
2004	P.I.M.P. (Remix) (with: 50 Cent, Snoop Dogg & G-Unit)	MTV Video Music Awards – MTV Video Music Award for Best Rap Video	Nominated
2006	Stay Fly (with: Three 6 Mafia & 8Ball & MJG)	MTV Video Music Awards – MTV Video Music Award for Best Hip-Hop Video	Nominated
2006	Stay Fly (with: Three 6 Mafia & 8Ball & MJG)	MTV Video Music Awards – MTV Video Music Award – MTV2 Award	Nominated
2007	Get Buck	Ozone Awards – Best Video	Nominated
2008	I Got Money (with: Stix Izza & Hi-C)	Southern Entertainment Awards – Song of the Year	Nominated
2009	Starbucks (with: All Star Cashville Prince)	Southern Entertainment Awards – Mixtape of the Year	Nominated
2010	Back on My Buck Shit	Southern Entertainment Awards – Mixtape of the Year	Nominated
2010	Back on My Buck Shit	Southern Entertainment Awards – Best Art/Graphics on a Mixtape	Nominated
2010	Young Buck	Southern Entertainment Awards – Mixtape Artist of the Year (Male)	Nominated
2013	G.a.S - Gangsta and Street (with: Tha City Paper)	Southern Entertainment Awards – Mixtape of the Year	Nominated
2013	Young Buck	Southern Entertainment Awards – Artist of the Year	Nominated
