= Tony Yayo =

American rapper (born 1978)

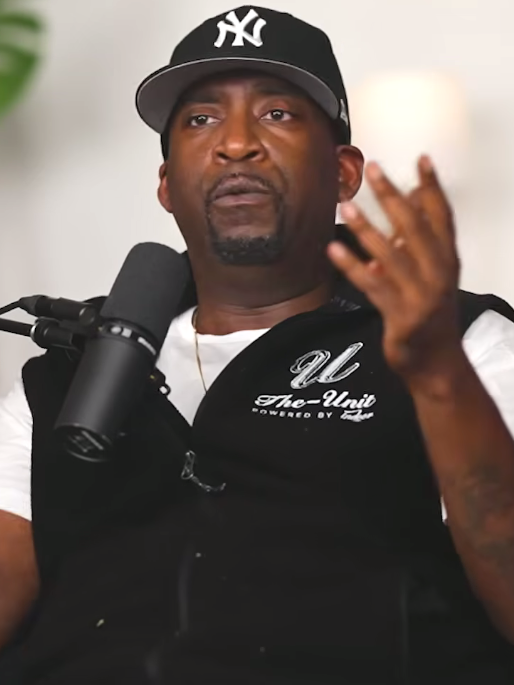
- Yayo in 2026

Background information
- Born: Marvin Bernard; March 31, 1978 (age 48); Queens, New York City, U.S.
- Genre: East Coast hip-hop
- Occupations: Rapper; songwriter
- Years active: 1998–present
- Labels: Interscope; G-Unit
- Member of: G-Unit

Marvin Bernard (born March 31, 1978), better known by his stage name Tony Yayo, is an American rapper. He is a founding member of G-Unit, a hip-hop group he formed in 1999 with fellow New York City-based rappers 50 Cent and Lloyd Banks. Yayo signed with G-Unit Records and Interscope Records to release his debut studio album, Thoughts of a Predicate Felon (2005), which debuted at number two on the Billboard 200. After eighteen years of not releasing a sophomore follow-up due to his association with G-Unit, Yayo returned with The Loyal Mixtape, which released on February 10, 2023.

His stage name is derived from the 1983 film, Scarface, referencing the main character Tony Montana, and yayo, a slang word for cocaine.

== Early life ==
Marvin Bernard was born on March 31, 1978, in Jamaica, a neighborhood in Queens, one of the five boroughs of New York City. His parents were Haitian immigrants; he was the youngest of three children. At age fifteen, he dropped out of school in the tenth grade and dealt drugs to support his family. A year later, his parents divorced. As a youth, he met his lifelong friends, Lloyd Banks and 50 Cent.

== Career ==
=== G-Unit ===
After his release from prison on drug charges, the trio formed the group, G-Unit, and began working on music together. The first underground mixtape featuring Bernard (who now went under the stage name Tony Yayo), was 134 All Starz, released in late 2000, referencing the street he grew up on. However, G-Unit went on a hiatus after 50 Cent was shot nine times and released from Columbia Records. Two years later, G-Unit released a number of mixtapes, including 2002's 50 Cent Is the Future, No Mercy, No Fear, and God's Plan.

While Yayo was incarcerated in 2003, his comrade 50 Cent was granted his own record label, G-Unit Records after the success of his debut studio album Get Rich or Die Tryin', which was released that February; Yayo appears on the album's track, "Like My Style". 50 immediately signed G-Unit members Yayo and Lloyd Banks to the label, and eventually Young Buck was signed and added to the group as the official fourth member; Buck was later retracted as Yayo's temporary replacement due to his incarceration. From 2003 to 2010, most of G-Unit's artists (including Yayo) were distributed by Interscope Records. G-Unit released their debut studio album, Beg for Mercy, on November 14, 2003. It went on to sell over four million copies in the United States alone. The album was released while Yayo was still finishing a prison sentence on various charges, but he was still featured on the album and his face was also shown on the album cover. G-Unit's sophomore and final album, T.O.S: Terminate on Sight, was released on July 31, 2008, and went on to sell 102,000 copies in its first week.

Due to issues between Yayo, 50 and Young Buck, G-Unit went under in 2014, but later reunited as a quintet with the original four members and a newly added Kidd Kidd. They only released two EPs, The Beauty of Independence (2014), and The Beast Is G Unit (2015), before 50 Cent publicly dissolved the group again in 2022.

=== Podcast ===
In 2025, Yayo and rapper Uncle Murda launched the podcast The Real Report on the Volume network. The show, which premiered in January 2026, interviews celebrities from the entertainment industry.

=== Solo career ===
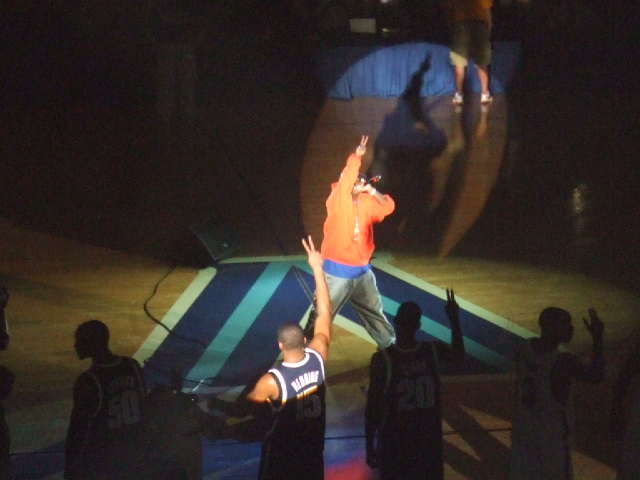
Tony Yayo performing at Villanova Hoops Mania in 2005

His career as a rapper was halted by his ongoing jail sentence from early 2003 until mid-2004. With Yayo incarcerated, G-Unit and close friend Eminem began a campaign called "Free Yayo". Yayo said that he was unaware of the attention the campaign was getting until he saw Eminem wearing a "Free Yayo" shirt on stage at the 2003 Grammy Awards, where he performed his 8 Mile theme song, "Lose Yourself".

Though his appearances on numerous mixtapes throughout his jail time announced his return on a street level, it was not until the release of Lloyd Banks' "Ain't No Click" and its parent album, The Hunger for More (2004), which featured Yayo that the latter received widespread recognition. His solo career hype was followed up by his debut single, "So Seductive" featuring 50 Cent, On August 30, 2005, Tony Yayo released his debut studio album, Thoughts of a Predicate Felon, debuting at number two on the Billboard 200 behind Kanye West's Late Registration. He also appeared on the track, "Fake Love", which made its way to the soundtrack for 50 Cent's acting debut, Get Rich or Die Tryin', which released that November.

In 2007, Tony Yayo confirmed that work was in progress for his second studio album. In 2009, Yayo and Lloyd Banks were released from Interscope due to disagreements between the two members, 50 Cent and their former label's co-founder, Jimmy Iovine.

On May 20, 2010, Yayo released the single, "Pass the Patron", once again featuring 50 Cent. The single's release was distributed by G-Unit Records and EMI Music Distribution (which is now known today as Virgin Music). On March 2, 2011, Yayo released another single called "Haters". The song features 50 Cent, Shawty Lo and Roscoe Dash. The single was released via the This Is 50 website after its premiere on Hot 97 through radio DJ Funkmaster Flex. The single rapidly started to gain success on the urban radio charts and soon debuted on the Billboard Hot R&B/Hip-Hop song chart at number one-hundred-twelve.

After a twelve year hiatus, Yayo released his sophomore solo album and his first following his disaffiliation from 50 Cent and G-Unit, The Loyal, on February 10, 2023, exclusively on Apple Music, but it was later released on other competing streaming services four days later on Valentine's Day. Later in July, he released a mixtape titled the 134 Tape.

== Legal issues ==
=== Weapon possession, bail jumping and forged passport; incarceration (2002–04) ===
Along with 50 Cent and several other affiliates, Yayo was arrested on December 31, 2002, during a New Year's Eve party in Midtown Manhattan for first-degree possession of a loaded firearm by a convicted felon. He had a Glock 20 handgun and a Colt AR-15 in the trunk of his car. When police discovered that Yayo had a prior 1996 conviction for drug possession and an outstanding warrant for a previous gun charge, Yayo was arrested and then subsequently sentenced for bail jumping and spent a year in prison. Yayo served time in the Lakeview Shock Incarceration Correctional Facility in the village of Brocton in Chautauqua County, New York. He was paroled on January 8, 2004. The next day, he was arrested for possessing a forged passport and served time in federal prison until February 24, 2004.

=== Assault charge and dismissal (2007–08) ===
On March 24, 2007, Tony Yayo and childhood friend, Lowell Fletcher (alias Lodi Mack), were both arrested for the alleged simple assault on fourteen-year-old James Rosemond, Jr. (alias Lil Henchman), who is confirmed to be the son of Czar Entertainment founder and drug trafficker James Rosemond (alias Jimmy Henchman). The incident was perceived to have had a connection with Tony Yayo and G-Unit's ongoing dispute with former colleague and Henchman's client at the time, The Game. 50 Cent was also accused of approaching the child, along with members of his entourage, and pushing him against a nearby wall. However, he had proven his innocence with video footage showing him at his former Connecticut mansion at the time of the alleged incident. Yayo reportedly slapped the boy several times and yelled at him "fuck Czar Entertainment, nigga!" His co-conspirator, Fletcher, also pistol whipped Rosemond, Jr., and apparently threatened him with the same gun, causing the adolescent child to run off in fear.

Tony Yayo made his first court appearance on the morning of April 25, 2007, in the United States District Court for the Eastern District of New York. The case was adjourned to July 24. Yayo plead not guilty to all charges. His lawyer has expressed his belief that Yayo is innocent and commented on the situation in an interview with MTV:

After a thorough investigation, I steadfastly and adamantly state to you that my client [Tony Yayo] did not slap anyone. I am hopeful that when [authorities] complete their investigation, they will come to the same conclusion. Marvin Bernard, as a father, understands the allegations and would never do anything to harm a child.

A week before his court appearance, on April 18, the house of Yayo's mother was struck with bullets. The attack is believed to be in retaliation for his assault and to be ordered by Jimmy Henchman as vengeance for assaulting his son. Yayo references the attack on the G-Unit song, "Straight Outta Southside" (2008).

On July 24, 2007, Tony Yayo attended a court hearing regarding his alleged assault. The prosecution offered him a nine-month prison sentence if he pleaded guilty, which he rejected. Ultimately, prosecutors dropped all charges against him in February 2008. The mother of Rosemond's son sued him and 50 Cent two months later.

Eventually, his friend, Lodi Mack, took legal responsibility for the action and pleaded guilty to aggravated assault with a weapon and unlawful gun possession in relation. He, in November 2007, was sentenced to two years and nine months in prison.

=== Murder of close friend and homicide attempts by Jimmy Henchman (2009–14) ===
After Yayo's friend, Lowell "Lodi Mack" Fletcher, was paroled in late-September 2009, Fletcher was murdered outside of a grocery store in the New York City borough of the Bronx. Also, there were numerous murder attempts on the lives of Tony Yayo and 50 Cent ordered by Jimmy Henchman, including an attempt to explode a "bulletproof" limousine with the two inside of it. These attempts were conspired as revenge for Yayo and Fletcher assaulting Rosemond's son. 50 responded by recruiting Atlanta gang members to place a dead rat on the doormat of Henchman's home in New York.

In 2014, after a hung jury in a federal trial which charged Rosemond for drug trafficking, murder for hire, conspiracy to commit homicide and other related federal charges in connection to the murder of Yayo's friend, Lodi Mack, and continuing to run his criminal enterprise, he was found guilty of all charges and sentenced to life in prison.

== Legacy ==
Tony Yayo inspired American wrestler John Cena's “You Can’t See Me” wrestling finishing taunt. John Cena admitted to this in an interview with Jimmy Fallon in 2022.

== Discography ==
Studio albums

- Thoughts of a Predicate Felon (2005)

Collaborative albums

- Beg for Mercy (with G-Unit) (2003)
- T·O·S (Terminate on Sight) (with G-Unit) (2008)

== Filmography ==
Films
Year	Title	Role	Notes
2009	Kiss and Tail: The Hollywood Jumpoff	Himself	
2010	Morning Glory	Himself	
2011	S.W.A.T.: Firefight	Carlos	
2012	One Blood	Brinks	
Video Games
Year	Title	Role	Notes
2005	50 Cent: Bulletproof	Himself	Voice role and likeness
2009	50 Cent: Blood on the Sand	Himself	Voice role and likeness
Television
Year	Title	Role	Notes
2004	The Howard Stern Show	Himself	
2005	Jimmy Kimmel Live!	Himself	Season 4, episode 96
2007	MTV Cribs	Himself	
2008	50 Cent: The Money and the Power	Himself	"Chose Your Crew Wisely"
