= G-Unit =

American hip-hop group

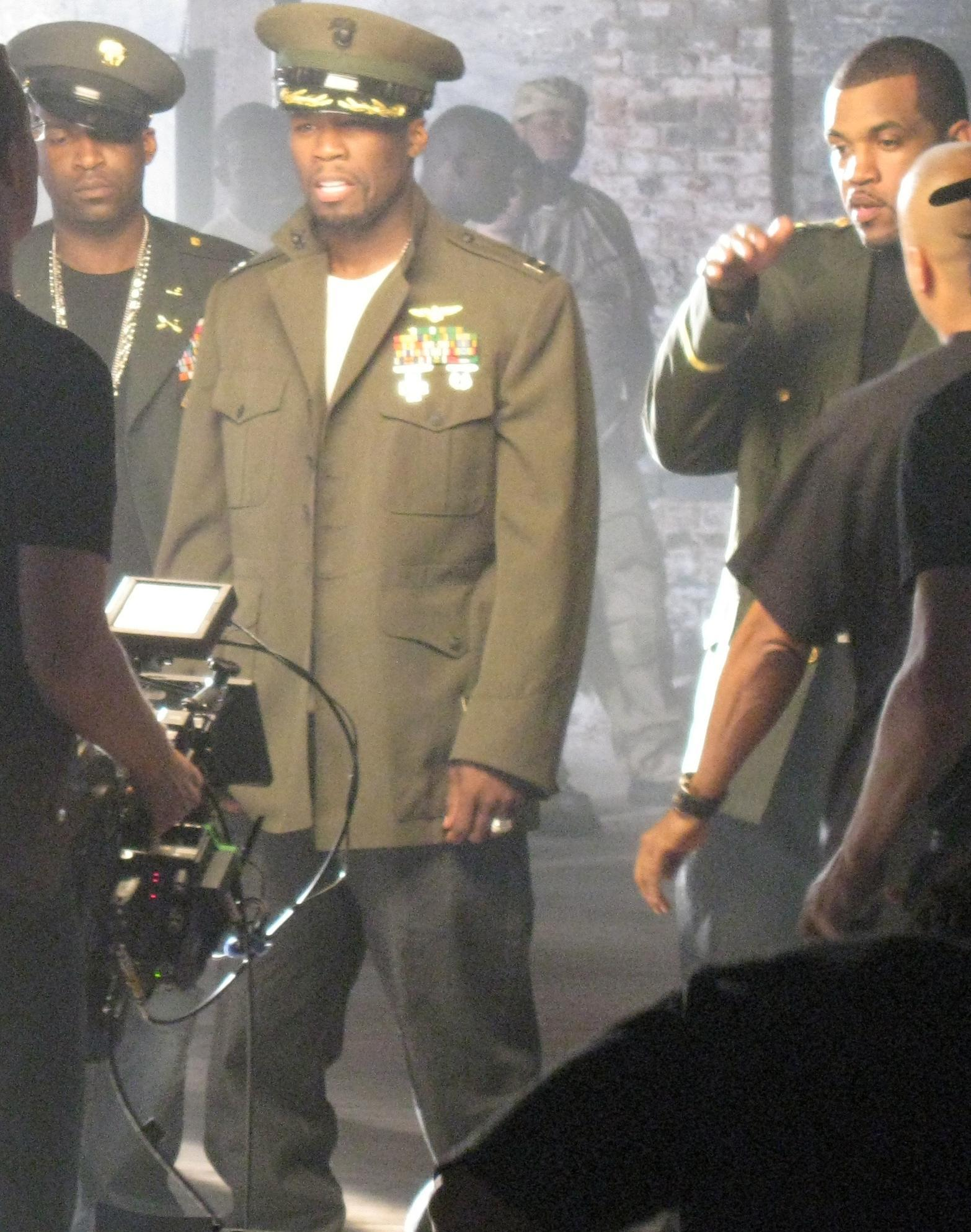
- The original G-Unit lineup; (left to right) Tony Yayo, 50 Cent and Lloyd Banks during a music video shoot.

Background information
- Also known as: Guerilla-Unit
- Origin: Queens, New York City, U.S.
- Genres: Hardcore hip-hop; gangsta rap
- Years active: 1999–2008, 2014–2022
- Labels: Interscope; G-Unit
- Past members: 50 Cent; Tony Yayo; Lloyd Banks; Young Buck; The Game; Kidd Kidd

G-Unit (short for Guerilla-Unit / Gangsta-Unit) was an American hip-hop group formed by longtime friends and East Coast rappers 50 Cent, Tony Yayo, and Lloyd Banks. After amassing a string of self-released mixtapes in the early 2000s, the group released their debut album Beg for Mercy in 2003; the album went on to sell over two million copies in the US and was certified double platinum by the Recording Industry Association of America (RIAA).

During Tony Yayo's imprisonment in 2003, the group recruited Tennessee-based rapper Young Buck as a temporary replacement and later an official member. Californian rapper The Game was also made a member in late 2003 after Beg for Mercy, in an effort to promote him after he was signed to Aftermath/Interscope; he was ousted from the group in February 2005 for alleged disloyalty according to 50 Cent. In April 2008, Young Buck was removed from the group due to his problematic behavior. In July 2008, the group released their second studio and final album, T·O·S (Terminate on Sight), featuring the original trio.

In 2014, Yayo and 50 Cent both separately stated that G-Unit was no more. However, the group members reconciled and reunited soon thereafter; the group became a quintet, with the rejoining of Young Buck and the addition of G-Unit Records artist Kidd Kidd. The group performed at Summer Jam 2014; they released their first collaborative project in six years, the EP The Beauty of Independence, in August of the same year.

In 2018, Kidd Kidd announced that he was leaving both the group and label to become a more independent artist; Lloyd Banks and Young Buck also later departed after revolved disputes with 50 Cent. In 2022, 50 Cent confirmed that the group had once again disbanded and stated that there would never be a reunion, citing disaffection with the other members.

== History ==
=== Formation and early years (2001–2002) ===
The group's founding members, 50 Cent, Lloyd Banks and Tony Yayo were all friends raised in South Jamaica, a neighborhood in the Queens borough of New York City, New York, and began rapping together. After 50 Cent lost his record deal with Columbia Records in 2000, the group began recording music independently, and released several mixtapes between 2002 and 2003, the most prominent of these being 50 Cent Is the Future, God's Plan, No Mercy, No Fear and Automatic Gunfire.

=== Debut album and success (2002–03) ===
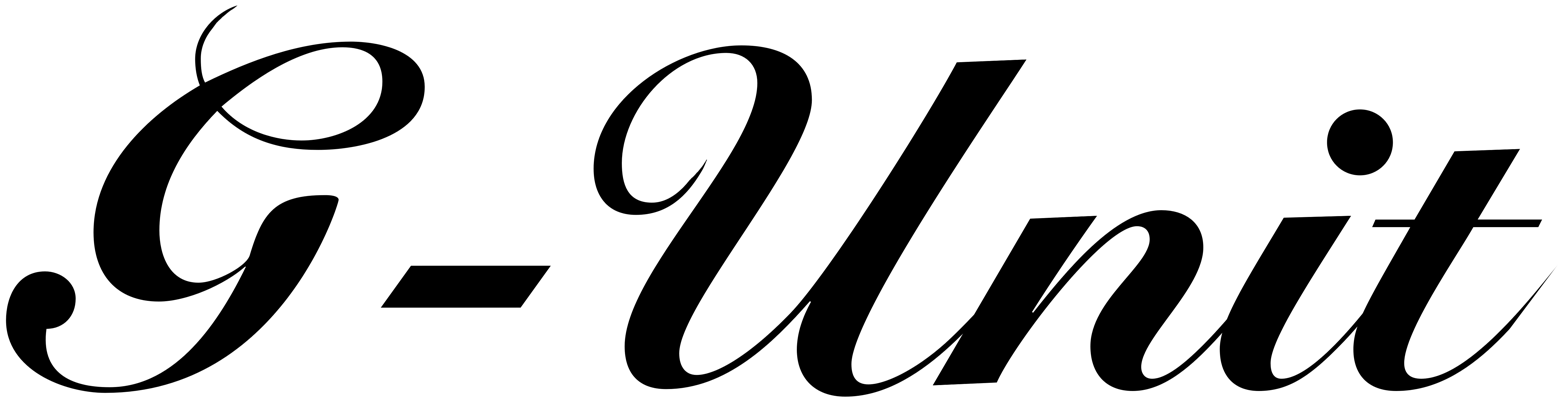
Original G-Unit logo

Shortly after the unsolved murder of Jam Master Jay, 50 Cent, an artist with JMJ Records since the mid-1990s, received a call from Eminem who signed him to Shady Records, under the aegis of Dr. Dre's Aftermath Entertainment and Interscope Records. After signing to Interscope, he was granted his own record label, which led to the creation of G-Unit Records. 50 Cent immediately signed both Lloyd Banks and Tony Yayo to the label. They began working on G-Unit's debut album. However, Tony Yayo was incarcerated at the time and was unable to record any new material for the album. This led to 50 Cent signing Tennessee-based rapper Young Buck to G-Unit Records; subsequently Young Buck was added to the group. After the signing of Young Buck, G-Unit made their first major label appearance as a group on the remix to 50 Cent's single "P.I.M.P.", which featured Snoop Dogg, Banks and Young Buck.

Later in November 2003, the group released their debut studio album, Beg for Mercy. The album featured guest appearances from R&B singers Joe and Butch Cassidy, and production was handled by high-profile producers such as Hi-Tek, Dr. Dre and Scott Storch, among several others. 50 Cent also served as the album's executive producer. Due to Tony Yayo's incarceration, he only made two appearances on the album, both of which used pre-recorded material. His face is seen on the brick wall of the album cover because he could not be photographed on account of his jail sentence. Beg for Mercy went on to sell over 3.9 million units in the U.S., 5.8 million copies worldwide, and has since been certified quadruple Platinum by the RIAA.

=== Feud with The Game/solo albums (2004–07) ===
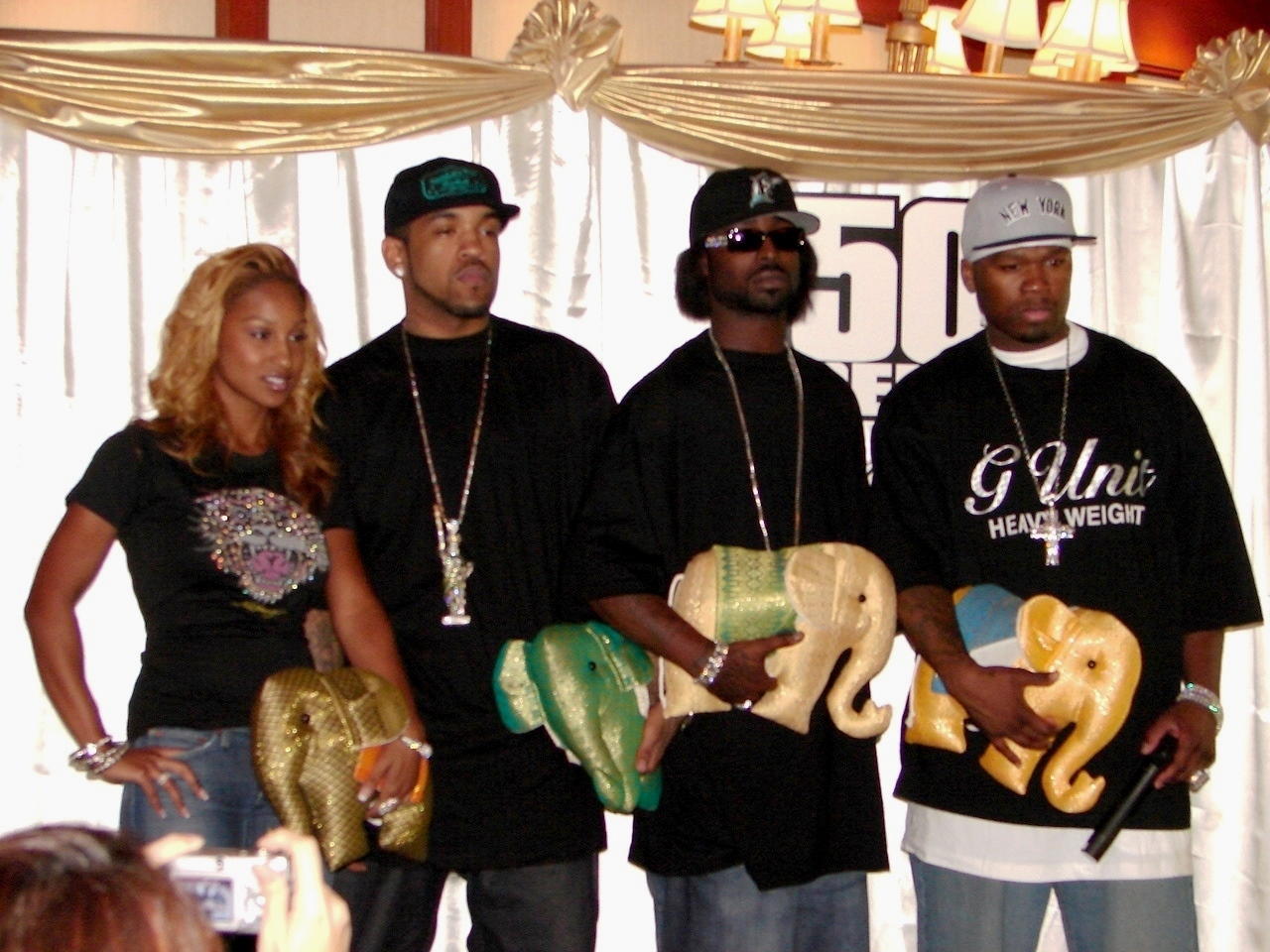
Olivia, Lloyd Banks, Young Buck and 50 Cent in Bangkok, February 2006

During the production of Beg for Mercy, Los Angeles rapper The Game was discovered and placed into G-Unit by Dr. Dre and Jimmy Iovine of Interscope Records. Their plan was to market The Game as a devotee, or a loyal member of 50 Cent's "camp". Due to being placed late into G-Unit, The Game makes no appearances on Beg For Mercy; however, he appears in the music videos for Wanna Get To Know You and Poppin' Them Thangs and was mentioned in the latter song. The Game made his first appearances as a member of G-Unit on Lloyd Banks' and Young Buck's debut albums, The Hunger for More and Straight Outta Cashville. Throughout 2004, The Game began working on his debut studio album, which was set to be executive produced by 50 Cent and Dr. Dre. In November 2004, the album's second single, "How We Do" featuring 50 Cent became a top 5 hit, as did the album's third single, "Hate It or Love It", which peaked at No. 2 on the Billboard Hot 100, being held back from the top spot by 50 Cent's single, "Candy Shop" featuring Olivia.

Beginning in 2005, tensions began to rise between 50 Cent and The Game. Shortly after the release of The Documentary, tensions escalated into a full-scale feud which led to 50 Cent announcing that The Game had been kicked out of G-Unit, with 50 Cent saying he had not received full credit for writing six songs from The Documentary. The two held a press conference on March 9, 2005, calling a truce between the two of them and seeming to publicly squash the feud. However, shortly after, The Game and G-Unit continued to attack one another, releasing numerous diss tracks throughout 2005 and 2006.

In 2007 while leaving a studio, Tony Yayo (one third of G-Unit), and his friend Lodi Mack saw Jimmy Henchman's (The Game's manager) 14-year-old son. The two proceeded to assault the 14 year old which would lead to Lodi Mack's arrest. He was sentenced to two years in Prison and in 2009 Jimmy Henchman hired a hitman to kill Lodi Mack. In 2017, Jimmy Henchman was found guilty of murder; he is now spending two life sentences in prison.

=== Second album and dissension (2008–13) ===
On April 7, 2008, in an interview with Shanna Leviste on New York's Hot 97 FM, 50 Cent stated that Young Buck was no longer a member of G-Unit, but was still signed to G-Unit Records. 50 Cent said problems involving excessive spending and Young Buck's public statement to not being paid royalty checks and "inconsistent behavior" from Young Buck, such as appearing on stage with his former Cash Money label-mate Lil Wayne, then seemingly dissing him on records with G-Unit were the main reasons for his removal.

On June 17, 2008, Young Buck responded to 50 Cent's allegations with the song "Taped Conversation". The Game jumped onto the track later on, in which they take shots at 50 Cent, Lloyd Banks and Tony Yayo.

Their second album, T·O·S (Terminate on Sight), was released on July 1, 2008. As a result of Young Buck's removal from the group, Young Buck still appeared on songs previously recorded with the group; however, he was credited as a featured artist. As of August 8, 2008, the album had sold 507,000 copies in the United States. Along with Young Buck, reggae singer Mavado appears on the album, while production came from Swizz Beatz, Street Radio, Tha Bizness, Rick Rock and Polow da Don, among several others.

=== Reunion and EPs (2014–17) ===
On February 20, 2014, Tony Yayo said that G-Unit had officially broken up, saying he and 50 Cent were no longer friends, and also announced his retirement from music, saying it had caused him too much stress and that he had already accomplished everything he wished to do. Then, after what seemed like condescending comments made about Lloyd Banks and Yayo in multiple interviews, on April 25, 2014, 50 Cent said that due to the recent inside-fighting, G-Unit was currently "dismantled." Despite this, on June 1, 2014, G-Unit reunited at the 21st annual Summer Jam with 50 Cent, Lloyd Banks, Tony Yayo, Young Buck, and G-Unit's newest member, Louisiana rapper Kidd Kidd appearing on stage together. The following day, G-Unit released a song titled "Nah I'm Talkin' Bout", a remix of HS87's "Grindin My Whole Life", making their comeback official. Throughout June 2014, G-Unit released numerous remixes to popular songs by other artists, including Drake, Trey Songz, and Jeremih, as well as an original song, "They Talked About Jesus". On June 4, 50 Cent announced they were working on a studio album and revealed plans to release it by late November 2014, and on June 25, 2014, announced they would be releasing a mixtape prior to the album. On August 25, 2014, G-Unit surprised fans with an extended play (EP) titled The Beauty of Independence, which was released at midnight, via digital retailers.

After the first EP, the group released music videos for "Watch Me" and "Changes". G-Unit planned to release the second EP in November, but after the release of The Beauty of Independence, it was announced that the album would divided into two parts, The Beauty of Independence and The Beast Is G-Unit. The group planned to release The Beast in late October, but the EP was pushed back to a later release in 2015. On November 10, 2014, a deluxe version of The Beauty of Independence was released, containing two new songs, "Ease Up" and "Big Body Benz". On January 20, 2015, the cover art for The Beast Is G-Unit was revealed via social media. The Beast Is G-Unit was released on March 3, 2015.

In August 2016, they released The Lost Flash Drive, composed of numerous unreleased songs.

=== Final projects and disbandment (2018–22) ===
On April 11, 2018, Kidd Kidd announced his departure from both the group and G-Unit Records to focus on his own label, RLLNR Entertainment.

On February 1, 2018, in his single "Crazy" featuring PnB Rock, 50 Cent said he and Lloyd Banks were no longer on speaking terms, and in June, Banks and 50 Cent announced his departure from both the group and the label via Instagram.

On September 2, 2020, 50 Cent stated during an Instagram Live interview with DJ Whoo Kid that he wanted to erase the group and their success from his memories "forever". He also echoed accusations that Lloyd Banks and Tony Yayo's inconsistencies were what caused him to blame himself for their failures as solo artists. With him and Tony Yayo left as the only members of the original lineup by this time, on August 3, 2022, 50 Cent stated on The Breakfast Club that he was done "carrying" the group and there would not be another G-Unit album; this was confirmation that G-Unit had officially broken up for the second time.

== Other ventures ==
=== Clothing line ===
The G-Unit Clothing Company was established in 2003, when 50 Cent teamed up with Marc Ecko (the founder of Eckō Unlimited), to create a line of clothing and accessories inspired by 50 Cent and fellow members of G-Unit.

=== G-Unity Foundation ===
G-Unit has founded G-Unity Foundation Inc. (often called simply G-Unity), a public foundation that provides grants to nonprofit organizations that focus on improving the quality of life for low-income and under served communities.

== Controversies ==
=== Ja Rule ===
Before signing with Interscope Records, 50 Cent had been in disputes with rapper Ja Rule and his label Murder Inc. Records. 50 Cent said that the feud began in 1999 after Ja Rule spotted him with a man who took his chain. However, Ja Rule said the conflict stemmed from a video shoot in Queens because 50 Cent did not like Ja Rule "getting so much love" from the neighborhood. A confrontation occurred in a New York studio where rapper Black Child, a Murder Inc. artist, stabbed 50 Cent, which resulted in him having four stitches.

Although it seemed that the feud was over, Ja Rule returned with a track entitled "21 Gunz". In response, Lloyd Banks and 50 Cent released the track "Return of Ja Fool" on Lloyd Banks' mixtape Mo Money in the Bank Pt. 4, Gang Green Season Starts Now.

In an interview with MTV, Ja Rule has stated that his new album, The Mirror, will not be continuing any past feuds that he has engaged in. He said:

There was a lot of things I wanted to say, and I didn't want there to be any bitter records on the album. Because I'm not bitter about anything that happened [in the past few years].

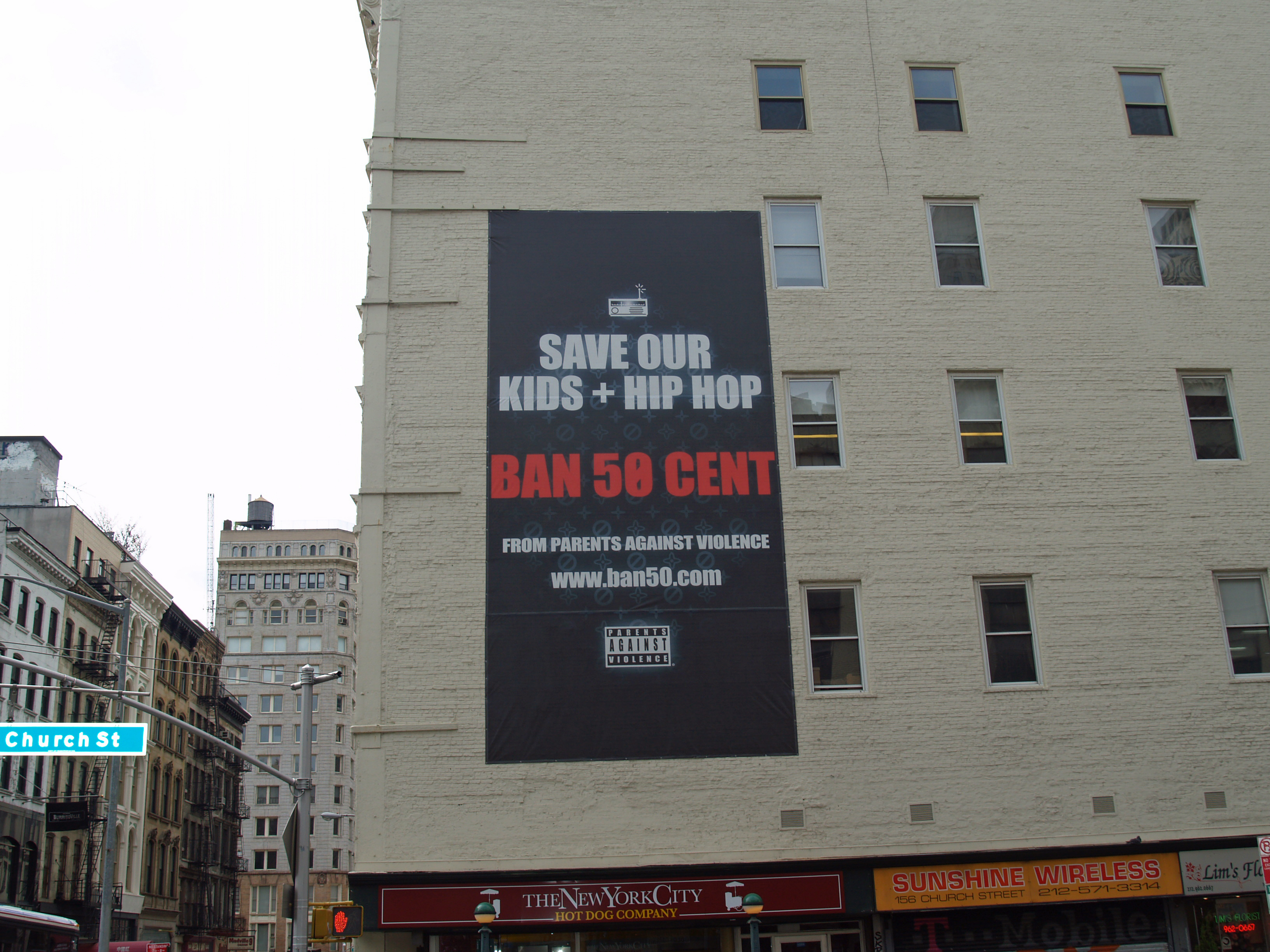
An anti-50 Cent billboard in Tribeca, New York

=== The Game ===
In early 2005, a feud between The Game and G-Unit began. Even before The Game's first album, The Documentary, was released and their feud became public, there was tension between The Game and 50 Cent. Soon after The Documentary's release, 50 Cent felt that the rapper was disloyal for saying he did not want to participate in G-Unit's feud with other rappers, and even wanting to work with artists with whom G-Unit were feuding, such as Nas and Jadakiss.

50 Cent also said that he was not getting his proper credit for the creation of the album. He also said that he wrote five of the songs, but The Game denied that. During that dispute, The Game confronted 50 Cent at the Hot 97 studio in New York City and members of The Game's entourage began shooting at 50 Cent and other members of the G-unit entourage, causing them to flee the building and causing Hot 97 radio security to shoot a member of The Game's entourage. After the situation between them escalated, 50 Cent and The Game held a press conference to announce their reconciliation. Fans had mixed feelings as to whether the rappers created a publicity stunt to boost the sales of the two albums the pair had just released. Nevertheless, even after the situation had apparently deflated, G-Unit continued to feud with The Game who responded during a performance at Summer Jam and launched a boycott of G-Unit called "G-Unot".

After the performance at Summer Jam, The Game responded with "300 Bars and Runnin'", an extended track aimed at G-Unit as well as members of Roc-A-Fella Records on the mixtape You Know What It Is Vol. 3. 50 Cent responded through his "Piggy Bank" music video, which features The Game as a Mr. Potato Head doll and also parodies other rivals. Since then both groups continued to attack each other. The Game released two more mixtapes, Ghost Unit and a mixtape/DVD called Stop Snitchin, Stop Lyin.

50 Cent's rebuttal was "Not Rich, Still Lyin'" where he mocks The Game. In addition, G-Unit started to respond on numerous mixtapes and new G-Unit Records artist Spider Loc began insulting The Game in various songs. The Game responded with "240 Bars (Spider Joke)", a song mainly aimed at Spider Loc, but also addressing Tony Yayo and rap group M.O.P., and on the song 100 Bars (The Funeral).

The feud seemed to have gained steam after Tony Yayo allegedly slapped the fourteen-year-old son of Czar Entertainment CEO, Jimmy Henchman. The Game responded with "Body Bags" on his mixtape, You Know What It Is Vol. 4. G-Unit have released a song named "We on Some Shit " which is aimed at Czar Entertainment as well as Cam'ron and Fat Joe. In June 2010 Game expressed that he would not object to a G-Unit reunion. After the G-Unit reunion idea circulated around the internet a Facebook group was launched to help encourage the G-Unit comeback. In late 2016, the two ended their long standing feud.

=== Fat Joe ===
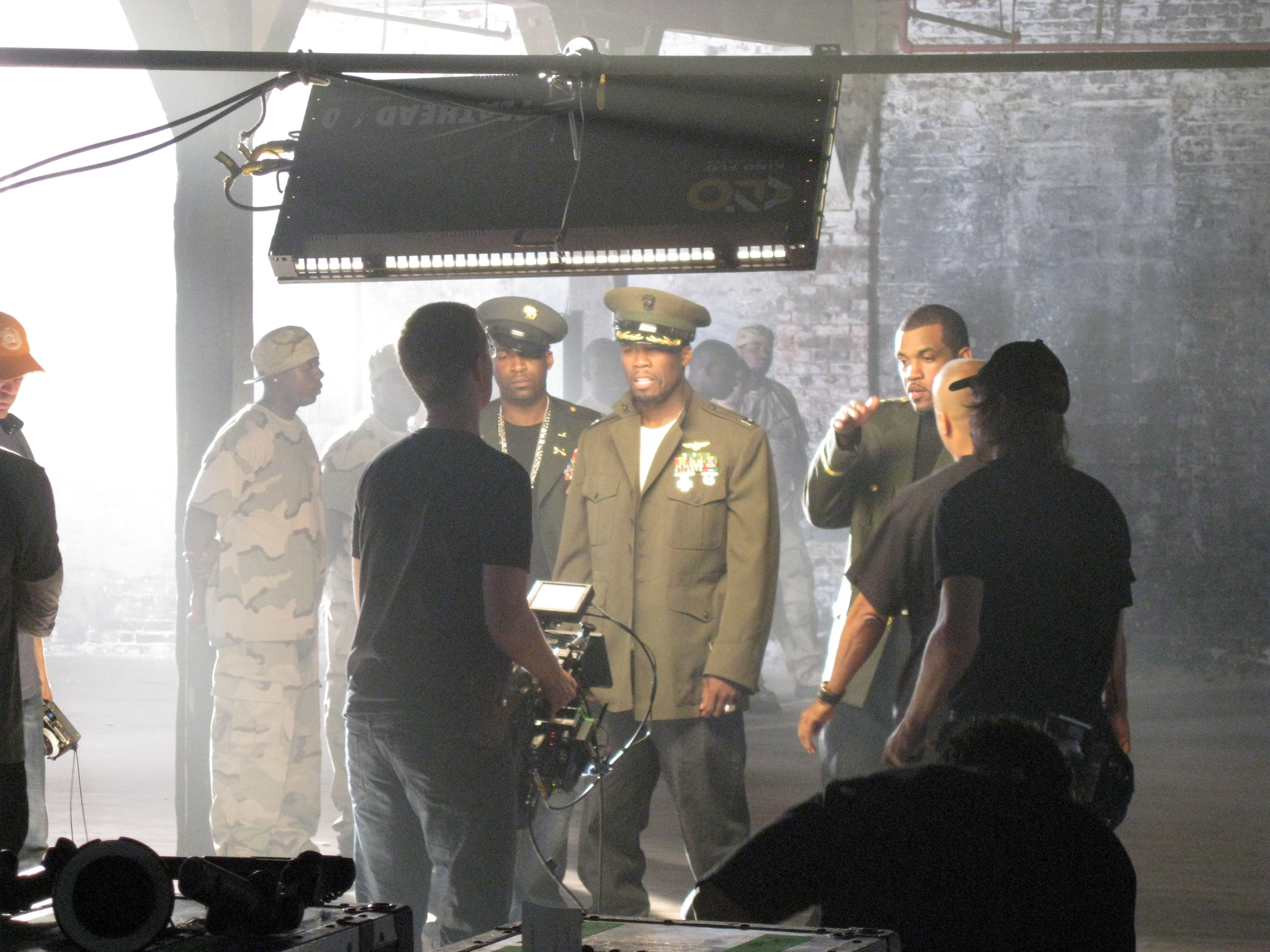
G-Unit on the set of the "Rider Pt. 2" video, a diss track aimed at Fat Joe

50 Cent pointed out that Fat Joe painted a target on himself for partnering up with Ja Rule on the song "New York". 50 Cent recorded the track "Piggy Bank", in which he attacked Fat Joe. Fat Joe responded with a track entitled "My Fofo" and although he said that he would not respond in songs after this, he made one more track, "Victim" which 50 Cent is purportedly the subject of as well as a guest appearance on Rick Ross' Mafia Music remix. 50 Cent and Tony Yayo took more shots at him on "I Run NY".

Even though things died down, at the 2005 MTV Video Music Awards, Fat Joe mentioned that all of the police presence in the venue was "courtesy of G-Unit" which related to his lyrical accusations that 50 Cent was a "snitch". 50 Cent and Tony Yayo retaliated on set later in the show at the end of their performance by shouting obscenities towards Fat Joe and Terror Squad, which were censored by MTV. Tony Yayo said Fat Joe ran from them at the VMAs.

When asked about the 50 Cent and G-Unit situation in an interview Fat Joe said he will no longer be responding and that he has left it to his close friend Pistol Pete and his crew Kill All Rats (K.A.R) to handle. Pistol Pete appeared on The Game's "Stop Snitchin, Stop Lyin" DVD and disrespected Tony Yayo, Chris Lighty (owner of Violator Records who had ties with 50 Cent), and James Cruz (50 Cent's manager) and said he chased Tony Yayo near a jewelry store. Lloyd Banks, Spider Loc, and Young Buck have also been insulted by Fat Joe.

In 2007, the feud was continued in interviews and by affiliates from both parties. In 2008, the beef boiled over when 50 Cent released a mixtape entitled Elephant In the Sand, which is a mock title of Fat Joe's album The Elephant in the Room. The front and back covers contain photos of Fat Joe on a beach. In response Fat Joe and his group K.A.R. released a mixtape titled Gay-Unit hosted by Fat Joe himself.

The feud between 50 Cent and Fat Joe ended in 2012 when 50 Cent approached Fat Joe's trailer at the BET Awards where he was confronted by Fat Joe's entourage he told them he wanted to make peace out of respect for Chris Lighty, however Fat Joe was unsure of his intentions until later that day when they shook hands while appearing on stage together amongst other past and present Violator artists at the BET Awards segment that paid tribute to the label's founder Chris Lighty who died that year.

In 2014 Fat Joe gave a track titled Free to DJ Kay Slay to use as he was working on his final album and told him he can do whatever he wants with it. In light of the 2012 BET Awards Kay Slay decided to get 50 Cent to do a verse for it and put his on his mixtape The Rise Of A City. Although Fat Joe was unaware Kay Slay was putting 50 Cent on his track he approved stating unity is good for hip-hop. That same year, Tony Yayo shouted out Fat Joe, saying that there was "no beef".

=== Cam'ron ===
A feud between 50 Cent and Cam'ron began when 50 Cent was on Hot 97 giving an interview and Cam'ron called in. Cam’ron asked 50 Cent whether he had the power to stop records from being released on Koch Records and 50 Cent said that he does in some respects. As the conversation escalated into an argument, 50 Cent called Koch Records the "industry graveyard". Cam'ron pointed out that Jim Jones' newest album sold just as much as Lloyd Banks' album did, despite the fact that Dipset is on an independent label while G-Unit is on a major label. 50 Cent took offense to this and said that Lloyd Banks has more money than Lil Wayne and Jim Jones, which makes record sales irrelevant. Cam'ron became upset and rebutted 50 Cent's statements. Most notably, he brought up the poor record sales of the Mobb Deep album, Blood Money. Eventually the debate became so heated that the radio station was forced to end the call.

== Discography ==
Studio albums

- Beg for Mercy (2003)
- T·O·S (Terminate on Sight) (2008)

Extended plays

- The Beauty of Independence (2014)
- The Beast Is G Unit (2015)

== Awards ==
- Vibe Awards
  - 2004 - Best Group of The Decade

== In popular culture ==
- In an episode of the MTV clay animated show Celebrity Deathmatch, entitled "Where's Lohan?", depicted a fight to the death between 50 Cent and The Game. The fight ends with 50 Cent shooting The Game with the bullets that were still inside 50 Cent's body.
