= Tony Yayo discography =

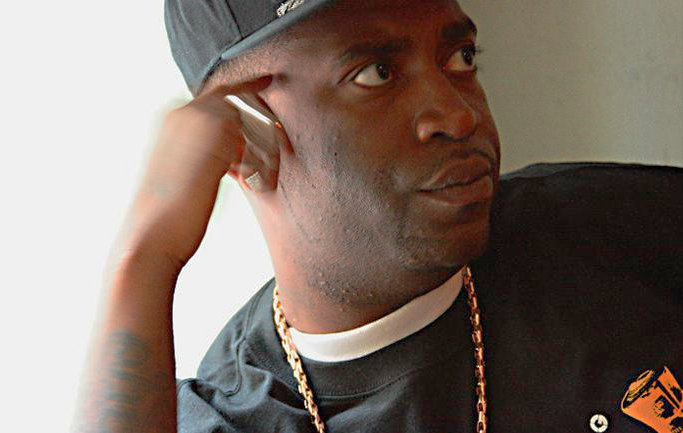
- Studio albums: 1
- Singles: 7
- Music videos: 31
- Mixtapes: 24
- Collaborative albums: 2
- EPs: 2

This is the discography of Tony Yayo, an American rapper.

== Albums ==
=== Studio albums ===
List of studio albums, with selected chart positions and sales figures
Title	Album details	Peak chart positions										Sales
Title	Album details	US	AUS	BEL (FL)	CAN	FRA	GER	IRE	NZ	SWI	UK	Sales
Thoughts of a Predicate Felon	Released: August 30, 2005; Label: G-Unit, Interscope; Format: CD, LP, digital download	2	72	50	3	50	34	23	38	58	41	

=== Collaborative albums ===
List of collaborative albums, with selected chart positions and certifications
Title	Album details	Peak chart positions										Certifications
Title	Album details	US	US R&B	US Rap	AUS	CAN	GER	IRE	NZ	SWI	UK	Certifications
Beg for Mercy (with G-Unit)	Released: November 14, 2003; Label: G-Unit, Interscope; Format: CD, LP, digital download	2	2	3	31	5	57	10	26	28	13	RIAA: 2× Platinum; MC: 2× Platinum; BPI: Platinum
T.O.S. (Terminate on Sight) (with G-Unit)	Released: July 1, 2008; Label: G-Unit, Interscope; Format: CD, LP, digital download	4	2	2	5	4	54	99	76	25	100	

== Extended plays ==
List of extended plays, with selected chart positions and sales figures
Title	EP details	Peak chart positions			Sales
Title	EP details	US	US R&B/HH	US Rap	Sales
The Beauty of Independence (with G-Unit)	Released: August 25, 2014; Label: G-Unit; Format: CD, digital download	17	5	3	US Sales: 20,000
The Beast Is G Unit (with G-Unit)	Released: March 3, 2015; Label: G-Unit; Format: CD, digital download	27	3	3	US Sales: 23,000

== Mixtapes ==
2008	S.O.D.; Released : September 29, 2008
2008	Black Friday; Released : November 14, 2008
2008	Bloody Xmas; Released : December 25, 2008
2009	The Swine Flu; Released : May 26, 2009
2009	The Swine Flu 2; Released : June 10, 2009
2009	Public Enemies; Released : July 21, 2009
2009	Gangsta Paradise: Gangsta Grillz; Released : August 25, 2009
2010	Gun Powder Guru; Released : February 1, 2010
2010	Gunpowder Guru 2: The Remixes; Released : March 22, 2010
2010	Hawaiian Snow (with Danny Brown); Released : September 14, 2010
2011	Gunpowder Guru 3; Released : March 17, 2011
2011	El Chapo; Released : May 4, 2011
2011	Meyer Lansky; Released : August 3, 2011
2011	Gunpowder Guru 4; Released : September 15, 2011
2012	El Chapo 2; Released : February 14, 2012
2012	Sex, Drugs, & Hip-Hop; Released : July 30, 2012
2013	Godfather Of The Ghetto; Released : June 28, 2013
2015	El Chapo 3; Released : November 13, 2015
2023	The Loyal; Released : February 14, 2023
2023	134 Tape; Released : July 24, 2023

== Singles ==
=== As lead artist ===
List of singles, with selected chart positions and certifications, showing year released and album name
Title	Year	Peak chart positions					Album
Title	Year	US	US R&B	US Rap	IRE	UK	Album
"So Seductive" (featuring 50 Cent)	2005	48	7	12	22	28	Thoughts of a Predicate Felon
"Drama Setter" (featuring Eminem and Obie Trice)	2005	—	—^{[a]}	—	—	—	Thoughts of a Predicate Felon
"Curious" (featuring Joe)	2005	—	85	—	—	—	Thoughts of a Predicate Felon
"I Know You Don't Love Me" (featuring G-Unit)	2005	—	105	—	—	—	Thoughts of a Predicate Felon
"Pass the Patron" (featuring 50 Cent)	2010	—	—	—	—	—	Non-album singles
"Haters" (featuring 50 Cent, Shawty Lo and Roscoe Dash)	2011	—	112	—	—	—	Non-album singles
"—" denotes a title that did not chart, or was not released in that territory.

=== As featured artist ===
List of singles, with selected chart positions, showing year released and album name
Title	Year	Peak chart positions	Album
Title	Year	US R&B	Album
"I Just Wanna" (50 Cent featuring Tony Yayo)	2012	60	The Big 10

== Other charted songs ==
List of songs, with selected chart positions, showing year released and album name
Title	Year	Peak chart positions		Album
Title	Year	US R&B	US Rap	Album
"Pimpin'"	2005	66	11	Thoughts of a Predicate Felon
"—" denotes a title that did not chart, or was not released in that territory.

- a. "Drama Setter" charted at 34 on the Hot R&B/Hip-Hop Singles Sales chart.

== Guest appearances ==
List of non-single guest appearances, with other performing artists, showing year released and album name
Title	Year	Other artist(s)	Album
"Like My Style"	2003	50 Cent	Get Rich or Die Tryin'
"Bump Heads"	2003	Eminem, Lloyd Banks, 50 Cent	DJ Green Lantern Presents: Invasion Part 2
"We All Die One Day"	2003	Obie Trice, Eminem, Lloyd Banks, 50 Cent	Cheers
"Bonafide Hustler"	2004	Young Buck, 50 Cent	Straight Outta Cashville
"Ain't No Click"	2004	Lloyd Banks	The Hunger for More
"Runnin'"	2005	The Game, Dion	The Documentary
"Shorty Wanna Gangsta Nigga"	2005	Young Buck	The Return of the Mixtape Millionaire (G-Unit Radio Part 13)
"You Already Know"	2005	Olivia	So Seductive (G-Unit Radio Part 12)
"Move That Thing"	2005	Olivia	So Seductive (G-Unit Radio Part 12)
"My Toy Soldier"	2005	50 Cent	The Massacre
"Hate It or Love It" (G-Unit Remix)	2005	50 Cent, The Game, Lloyd Banks, Young Buck	The Massacre
"Click Click"	2006	Mobb Deep	Blood Money
"Dont Make Me Hurt You"	2006	Young Buck	Chronic 2006
"The Projects"	2006	Young Buck, Lil Murda	Chronic 2006
"Show Discipline"	2006	Lloyd Banks	Mo Money In The Bank Pt. 5 (The Final Chapter)
"Black Superman"	2006	Lloyd Banks, Hot Rod	Mo Money In The Bank Pt. 5 (The Final Chapter)
"NY, NY"	2006	Lloyd Banks	Rotten Apple
"Ain't Nothin' Like Me"	2007	Joe, Young Buck	Ain't Nothin' Like Me
"Come and Get Me"	2007	Timbaland, 50 Cent	Timbaland Presents Shock Value
"Come Around" (Remix)	2007	Collie Buddz, Young Buck	none
"Touch the Sky"	2007	50 Cent	Curtis
"Rock to It"	2007	Hot Rod, 50 Cent, Lloyd Banks	none
"Straight to the Bank" (Remix)	2007	50 Cent, Hot Rod	none
"Queens"	2007	LL Cool J, 50 Cent, Prodigy, Kool G Rap	none
"Gorilla Shit"	2007	M.O.P., Young Buck	Yearly Physical
"Don't Take It There" (Remix)	2008	Uncle Murda, Junior Reid, Jim Jones, Sheek Louch	none
"I'll Be the Shooter"	2009	50 Cent, Lloyd Banks	none
"Make tha Trap Say Aye" (Remix)	2009	OJ da Juiceman, Gucci Mane	none
"So Crazy" (Remix)	2009	Mike Knox	none
"No Escape"	2009	Lloyd Banks	V.5
"Men of Respect"	2010	DJ Kayslay, Rell, Lloyd Banks, Papoose, Jim Jones	More Than Just a DJ
"I'm a Rider"	2010	Joe Young	none
"Take 'Em to War"	2010	Lloyd Banks	H.F.M. 2 (Hunger for More 2)
"Me Against the World"	2011	Travis Barker	Let the Drummer Get Wicked
"Shot Caller" (Remix)	2011	French Montana, Chinx Drugz, Lloyd Banks	Coke Boys Run NY
"Letcha Nutz Hang"	2011	40 Glocc, Kokane, Jayo Felony	C.O.P.S (Criping On Public Streets)
"B.A.Y.M.A.C.C."	2011	40 Glocc, Spider Loc, Gail Gotti, DJ Drama	The Graveyard Shift
"Dont Cross Me"	2011	Ron Browz, Karty	none
"I Just Wanna"	2011	50 Cent	The Big 10
"Nah, Nah, Nah"	2011	50 Cent	The Big 10
"Money Over Here"	2012	SoCyncere	#Straightjacket
"Body Bag"	2012	Trav, Chris Luck	Push
"Put Your Fist Up"	2012	DJ Kay Slay, Jim Jones, Sauce Money	Grown Man Hip-Hop
"Memory"	2013	Ashley Martinez	none
"Show Me Love"	2013	Troy Ave	New York City: The Album
"Machogelaber"	2014	Farid Bang	Killa
"If Words Could Kill"	2014	DJ Kay Slay, Maino, Trick-Trick	The Last Hip Hop Disciple
"Laughing At The Haters"	2014	DJ Kay Slay, Raekwon, Maino, Jim Jones	The Original Man
"Life"	2015	Young Buck, Kidd Kidd	Before The Beast
"Ask Somebody"	2016	Consequence, Ty Dolla $ign	none
"Work Hard"	2016	Lloyd Banks	All Or Nothing: Live It Up

== Music videos ==
=== As lead artist ===
Year	Title	Featured Artist(s)	Director(s)
2005	"So Seductive"	50 Cent	Gil Green
2005	"Curious"	Joe	Fat Cats
2005	"I Know You Don't Love Me"	50 Cent, Lloyd Banks, Young Buck	Gil Green
2007	"Stick Up"	Snoop, Mazaradi Fox	Dan "The Man" Melamid
2008	"Do It Right"	Max B, French Montana	Ron Adkins, Andy Benny
2008	"Face Off (Remix)"	Cory Gunz, Ransom	Ron Adkins
2008	"Swagga Like Us"		
2008	"Black Friday"		Ron Adkins
2008	"Smoke Break"		
2008	"Preach On"		Christopher "Broadway" Romero
2008	"Shooters For Hire"	Uncle Murda	
2009	"Die Slow"		Christopher "Broadway" Romero
2009	"Somebody Snitched On Me"		Andy Benny, James Del Gatto
2009	"They Hate"		Dan "The Man" Melamid
2009	"Candy Man"		Divine Davy
2009	"Weed And Hennessy"		
2009	"718 To 305	Jolly Green, Louie Castro	Andy Benny
2009	"Roll It Up"		Corentin "Frenchy" Villemeur
2009	"Swamp Nigga"		
2010	"Bullets Whistle"		Dawud Gaston
2010	"King Of The Pyrex"		
2010	"The Wall"		Christopher "Broadway" Romero
2010	"Everywhere We Go"		Corentin "Frenchy" Villemeur
2010	"The Price"		Christopher "Broadway" Romero
2010	"Obama"		50 Cent
2010	"Pass The Patron"	50 Cent	James "Latin" Clark
2011	"Tiger Blood"	Uncle Murda, Lucky Don	Jynx Millionaire
2011	"Body Bag"	Mobb Deep	Jynx Millionaire
2011	"Domepiece"		Jynx Millionaire
2011	"Never Lie"		Jynx Millionaire
2011	"Haters"	50 Cent, Shawty Lo, Kidd Kidd	Mr. Boomtown
