= Spider Loc discography =

This is the discography of rapper Spider Loc.

== Albums ==
=== Studio ===
- West Kept Secret: The Prequel
  - Released: September 11, 2007
- Da 1 U Love 2 Hate
  - Released: June 24, 2008

=== Mixtapes ===
- Reptible
- We On Top
- Arachnophobia
- Global Warning
- Land Of The Lost
- Southwest Influence
- Connected : Volume 1
- Connected : Volume 2
- Connected : Volume 3
- Connected : Volume 4
- Connected : Volume 5
- Connected : Volume 6
- Brainless : The Prequel
- Bangadoshish : Volume 1
- Bangadoshish : Volume 2
- Bangadoshish : Volume 3
- The Best Of Spider Loc : Volume 1
- Paroled (The Official Movie Mixtape)
- The Graveyard Shift (With 40 Glocc)
- G-Unit Radio : Part 18 - Rags 2 Riches
- The King Of R&B (Rappin' And Bangin') : Volume 1
- The King Of R&B (Rappin' And Bangin') : Volume 2
- The King Of R&B (Rappin' And Bangin') : Volume 3

=== DVDs ===
- Brainless : The Prequel
- Bangadosish

=== Guest appearances ===
- 2000: "Let's Ride" (Killa Tay feat. Revenge, D-Rome, Spade, Spider Loc & Young T) from (Snake Eyes)
- 2001: "Money, Power, Respect" (C-Bo & Brotha Lynch Hung feat. Spider Loc) from (Blocc Movement)
- 2005: "It Is What It Is" (Tony Yayo feat. Spider Loc) from (Thoughts of a Predicate Felon)
- 2005: "I Don't Know Officer" (50 Cent feat. Lloyd Banks, Prodigy, Spider Loc and Mase) from (Get Rich or Die Tryin' film soundtrack)
- 2005: "Bullshit & Nonsense" (Kurupt feat. Spider Loc & Eastwood) from (Against tha Grain)
- 2006: "Transferred" (Ras Kass feat. 40 Glocc & Spider Loc) from (Eat or Die)
- 2006: "Life" (Lloyd Banks feat. Spider Loc & Marsha Ambrosius) from (Rotten Apple)
- 2006: "Stop Bitchin" (Mr. Criminal feat. Spider Loc) from (Stay on the Streets)
- 2009: "Westside" (Cashis feat. Crooked I, Jayo Felony, Spider Loc & Ya Boy) from (The Art of Dying)
