= Nuttin' for Christmas =

1955 novelty Christmas song sung by Barry Gordon

"Nuttin' for Christmas" (also known as "Nothing for Christmas") is a novelty Christmas song written by Sid Tepper and Roy C. Bennett. It became a hit during the 1955 holiday season when it appeared in Billboard’s pop charts by five other artists. The highest-charting of the five recordings was released by Art Mooney and His Orchestra, with six-year-old Barry Gordon as lead vocalist. This version peaked at No. 6 and became a million-seller.

== Lyrics ==
In the song's lyrics, a young boy lists all of the wrongdoings he committed throughout the year that led to Santa Claus withholding his Christmas gifts. His offenses vary from minor accidents (e.g. tearing his pants while climbing a tree) to practical jokes (e.g. placing a thumbtack on his teacher's chair) and juvenile delinquency (e.g. using a slug to purchase gum). The song concludes with the boy pledging to improve his behavior in future and warning listeners to do the same.

== Cover versions ==
Another notable version was performed by Stan Freberg. Freberg's version adds a humorous coda when a man (voiced by Stan Freberg) in an outfit resembling Santa Claus's enters through the fireplace and reveals himself to be a robber; the singer directs the robber to the family's valuables, and both join in the closing refrain.

Other charting versions were recorded by the Fontane Sisters, Joe Ward, and Ricky Zahnd and the Blue Jeaners.

The song was revived on the Big Top label by Kenny and Corky and entered the Cashbox Top 100 in 1959.

Other artists who have recorded the song include Less Than Jake, Spike Jones, Eartha Kitt, Homer and Jethro, Relient K, Smash Mouth (featuring Rosie O'Donnell), Sugarland, Tonic Soul-fa, and the Vindictives.

A cover by Plain White T's was featured in the 2011 Disney Christmas special Prep & Landing: Naughty vs. Nice.

In 2009, the rap artist Tony Yayo sampled the original track on his mixtape The Swine Flu on a track titled "Somebody Snitched On Me" as a "diss" track for the rap artist Rick Ross.

In 2020, ska punk band We Are the Union released a parody of the song, titled “I’m Working Retail for Christmas”.
