= Spider Loc =

American rapper and actor from California

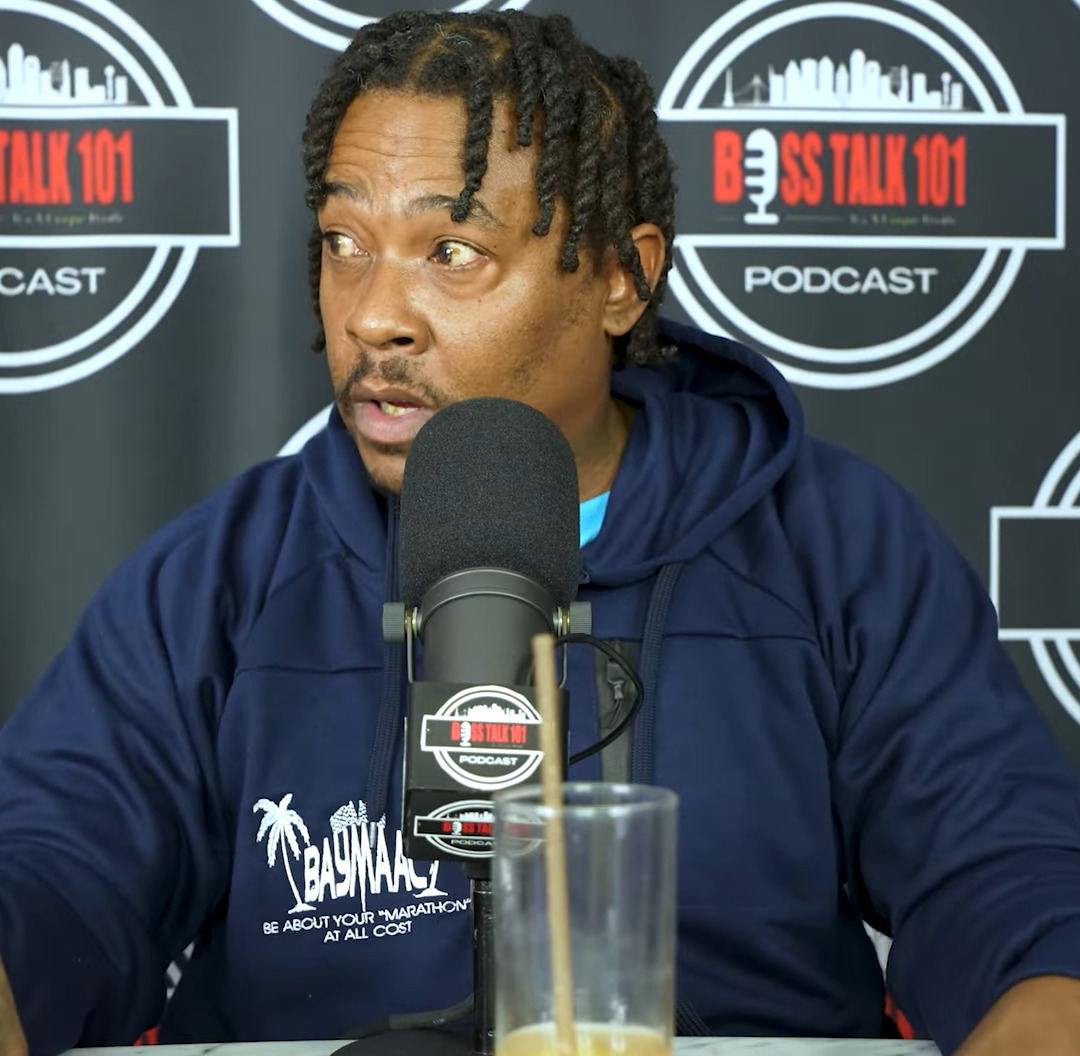
- Spider Loc in 2025

Background information
- Also known as: SPI
- Born: Curtis Williams; January 19, 1976 (age 50); Compton, California, U.S.
- Origin: Los Angeles, California, U.S.
- Genres: West Coast hip-hop; gangsta rap
- Occupations: Rapper; actor
- Years active: 2000–present
- Labels: Interscope; G-Unit

Curtis Williams (born January 19, 1976), more commonly known as Spider Loc, is an American rapper and actor. He was formerly signed to Interscope Records and 50 Cent's G-Unit Records.

== Biography ==
Spider Loc was discovered by Suge Knight and tagged along with Death Row Records, he later appeared on the Death Row Records released soundtrack to the movie Dysfunktional Family soundtrack, and also was affiliated with Kurupt's Against Tha Grain record label under the name "Spider", but never signed an agreement. In September 2004 Spider Loc met rapper Young Buck in Atlanta and performed for him. A week later in Los Angeles, Young Buck introduced him to 50 Cent on the set of the "Shorty Wanna Ride" video and he performed a freestyle rap. After four months the rapper signed a record deal with G-Unit.

Spider Loc has since been featured on many G-Unit mixtapes such as G-Unit Radio Part 18 - Rags to Riches and has also released his own mixtape G-Unit West title Bangadoshish with artists Young Buck, Big Syke (from Thug Life), 50 Cent, and Olivia.

In September 2007, he released a street album, West Kept Secret: The Prequel and the following June released a follow-up project Da 1 U Luv 2 Hate.

In an interview with HipHopDX released March 27, 2011, Spider Loc confirmed that he is still signed to G-Unit and did not move to EMI. In 2011 Spider stated that G-Unit West was back and up and running with the arrival of Slim da Mobster.

Spider Loc was dropped from G-Unit in late 2011.

On June 8, 2017, Spider Loc appeared on the game show Wheel of Fortune. During the episode, he stated he is currently employed as a security officer and is the father of 6 kids. He also runs his own record label, BAYMAAC Records.

In 2022 he launched a podcast entitled "Factz Ova Feelinz" on Alex Alonso's Street TV Network.

== Controversies ==
In 2005, while Spider Loc and friends were engaged in a fight with rapper Yukmouth and his companions in a Los Angeles nightclub, one of Spider Loc's friends stole jewelry from Yukmouth, which was later ransomed by its owner, Yukmouth. Yukmouth has said that the two have made up.

In July 2008, Spider Loc, 40 Glocc, Village Boo and a large number of Crips are seen on a YouTube video taunting Lil Wayne, Birdman and Slim of Cash Money Records. Lil Wayne was leaving his "Get Money" video shoot in Los Angeles when his two SUV's were blocked off by surrounding cars on a one way street. Spider Loc is seen walking around the cars and banging on the windows.

== Discography ==
=== Albums ===
- 2008: Da 1 U Love 2 Hate
- 2010: B.A.Y.M.A.A.C.
- 2011: The Graveyard Shift (with 40 Glocc & DJ Drama)

EP's

- 2007: The West Kept Secret: The Prequel
- 2019: Ill Literate
- 2020: The Loc

=== Mixtapes ===
Year	Title
2005	Brainless: The Prequel; Released : 2005
2005	G-Unit Radio: Part 18 - Rags 2 Riches (DJ Whoo Kid); Released : 2006
2006	Bangadoshish (DJ Whoo Kid); Released : 2006
2006	Southwest Influence (DJ Flipcyde); Released : 2006
2006	Connected (DJ Felli Fel); Released : 2006
2007	Bangadoshish 2 (DJ CRASH D with Papa Smurf); Released : 2007
2007	Paroled (The Official Movie Mixtape w/ DJ Crash D); Released : 2007
2007	Connected 2 (DJ Felli Fel & Nik Bean); Released : 2007
2007	Global Warning (DJ Woogie); Released : 2007
2007	Connected 3 (DJ Whoo Kid & DJ Crash D); Released : 2007
2008	The King Of R&B (Rapping & Banging) : Vol. 1 (DJ Crash D); Released : 2008
2008	Connected 4 (DJ Whoo Kid & Dj Crash D); Released : 2008
2008	The Best Of Spider Loc: Volume 1 (DJ Whoo Kid); Released : 2008
2008	Bangadoshish 3 (DJ Warrior & DJ Woogie); Released : 2008
2009	Connected 5 (DJ Whoo Kid & DJ Crash D); Released : 2009
2009	The King Of R&B (Rapping & Banging): Vol. 2 (DJ Nina 9 & DJ Crash D); Released : 2009
2009	Arachnophobia (Shadyville DJs); Released : 2009
2009	Land Of The Lost (DJ Crash D); Released : 2009
2009	We On Top (DJ Crash D); Released : 2009
2009	The King Of R&B : Vol. 3; Released : 2009
2009	Reptible (Shadyville DJs); Released : 2009
2009	Connected 6 (DJ Whoo Kid& DJ Crash D); Released : 2009
2009	Jac´n 4 Beats (Hosted by Gangsta Granny & DJ Crash D); Released : 2009
2010	B.A.Y.M.A.A.C (DJ Crash D); Released : 2010
2013	Streets May Be Icy: The Realist (with Cash Daddy) (DJ 1Hunnit & DJ RNS); Released : 2013
2014	C.R.I.P (with J-Llove); Released : September 30, 2014
2017	The Lost Tape; Released : 2017

=== DVDs ===
- 2005: Brainless: The Prequel (Directed by Marcus DJ Crash D Miller)
- 2006: Bangadosish (Directed by Marcus DJ Crash D Miller)
- 2011: Paroled (Directed by Sal Martino)

=== Guest appearances ===
- 2000: "Let's Ride" (Killa Tay feat. Revenge, D-Rome, Spade, Spider Loc & Young T) from Snake Eyes
- 2001: "Money, Power, Respect" (C-Bo & Brotha Lynch Hung feat. Spider Loc) from Blocc Movement
- 2001: "They Like Dat" (Kam feat. Dresta, Jayo Felony, Yukmouth & Spider) from Kamnesia
- 2005: "It Is What It Is" (Tony Yayo feat. Spider Loc) from Thoughts of a Predicate Felon
- 2005: "Things Change" (Spider Loc feat. Lloyd Banks & 50 Cent from Get Rich or Die Tryin' film soundtrack
- 2005: "I Don't Know Officer" (50 Cent feat. Lloyd Banks, Prodigy, Spider Loc and Mase) from Get Rich or Die Tryin' film soundtrack
- 2005: "Bullshit & Nonsense" (Kurupt feat. Spider Loc & Eastwood) from Against tha Grain
- 2005: "We Run the Streets" (Ras Kass feat. Spider Loc, Crooked I, El Dog, 40 Glocc & Cali Casino from Institutionalized
- 2006: "Transferred" (Ras Kass feat. 40 Glocc & Spider Loc) from Eat or Die
- 2006: "Mr. Potato Head (No More Games) (The Game Diss) (Young Buck feat. Spider Loc) from Best in the Bizness (G-Unit Radio Part 17)
- 2006: "Life" (Lloyd Banks feat. Spider Loc) from Rotten Apple
- 2006: "Pepsi Smash Mic Pass" M.O.P., Freeway, Lloyd Banks, Tony Yayo, Hot Rod
- 2006: "Stop Bitchin" (Mr. Criminal feat. Spider Loc) from Stay on the Streets
- 2007: "West Kept Secret" (Hot Rod Feat. Spider Loc) from The Hitman
- 2007: "They Don't Bother Me" (Young Buck feat. Murda Ma$e, Spider Loc & 50 Cent) from They Don't Bother Me
- 2008: "Wannabe" (Tony Yayo feat. Spider Loc, 40 Glocc) from Black Friday
- 2008: "Respect The Shooter" 615 feat. G-Unit, Spider Loc from The Hustle Dont Stop
- 2009: "Smoke Chronic" (Jay Rock Feat. Spider Loc, Schoolboy Q) from 30 Day Takeover
- 2009: "All My Life(Remix)" Jay Rock Feat. Glasses Malone, Kendrick Lamar, Ab-Soul, Schoolboy Q, Mistah F.A.B., Crooked I, 211, Sinful, TK, Eastwood, Omar Cruz, Nipsey Hussle, Problem, Roccett, Keno, Spider Loc, Bangloose & Roscoe Umali
- 2010: "In These Streets" Jay Rock Feat. Spider Loc from "Black Friday"
- 2012: "My Life (Remix)" Fas Action Feat. Spider Loc & Nipsey Hussle

== Filmography ==
=== Film ===
Year	Title	Role	Notes
2004	Bank Brothers	Innocent Perpetrator	Video
2007	Paroled	CJ Tillman	
2010	Rollers	Cash	
2020	The Council	Key Weigh	
2023	The Passenger -Spooky Hours	Corey	Short
2025	The Council 2	Key Weigh	

=== Television ===
Year	Title	Role	Notes
2006–07	Cold Case	Delonte	Guest Cast: Season 5–6
2007	Numb3rs	Prisoner #3	Episode "The Art of Reckoning"
2007	Weeds	Two-Strikes	Episode "He Taught Me How to Drive By"
2008	Shark	Gang Member	Episode "Bar Fight"
2009	Saving Grace	Marquis Smith	Episode "Am I Gonna Die Today?"

=== Video Games ===
Year	Title	Role	Notes
2005	50 Cent: Bulletproof	Additional Voices	
