= C. T. Fletcher =

American powerlifter

Personal information
- Nicknames: Superman, Plush Beard
- Born: June 8, 1959 (age 67) Pine Bluff, Arkansas, U.S.
- Occupations: Vlogger, media personality, actor, personal trainer, powerlifter, bodybuilder
- Height: 5 ft 11 in (180 cm)
- Weight: 220 lb (102 kg)
- Website: ctfletcher.com

Sport
- Country: United States
- Sport: Powerlifting
- Club: Iron Addicts Gym

Achievements and titles
- World finals: 3-time World Bench Press Champion; 3-time World Strict Curl Champion

C. T. Ali Fletcher (born June 8, 1959) is an American vlogger, media personality, actor, personal trainer, and former powerlifter and bodybuilder. He is a three-time World Bench Press Champion and three-time World Strict Curl Champion.

== Early life ==
Fletcher was born in Pine Bluff, Arkansas, on June 8, 1959, the son of Ogie Rea and Walter Fletcher. He has an older brother named Walt. At the time of his birth, his mother was a housewife and his father was a field worker. When he was one year old, he and his family moved to Los Angeles County, California, where they settled in Watts and later Compton. He grew up with an abusive father who, at the time, was preaching in a four-car garage. When he began junior high, they had moved to nearby Lakewood, where his father invested in his own church. At age 12, Fletcher acquired a job at a gas station. In 1977, aged 18, he joined the U.S. Army and was stationed in Germany. While there, he became interested in martial arts. In 1979, he started to take Karate classes and earned a second degree black belt. In 1980, he began weightlifting and bodybuilding. At first, he was interested in bodybuilding, but then powerlifting caught his interest.

== Career ==
In 2013, Fletcher started his YouTube channel. In 2016, he opened his own gym called Iron Addicts Gym.

== Personal life ==
Fletcher resides in Signal Hill, California. He was previously married to his high school sweetheart, with whom he had children. The marriage ended in the early 1990s, and he later married a woman he had met while working at the post office. In 1995, they had a child named Samson. In total, he and his wife have seven children.

=== Health ===
In 2001, Fletcher received a phone call from his doctor regarding his hypertension and how it could be life-threatening. His body had taken a major hit and he was disabled at age 42. In 2004, his mother died from congestive heart failure. The following year, he was admitted to a hospital in Long Beach, California; from there, he was transported to UCI Medical Center for open-heart surgery. He inherited a heart condition from his mother that has heavily impacted his life; his mother and all nine of her siblings died from heart problems. In 2005, he underwent life-saving open heart surgery. On an episode of The Joe Rogan Experience, he revealed that he had suffered another heart attack in June 2017, and was hoping to get on the waiting list for a heart transplant. On May 5, 2018, he announced via Twitter that a heart had been found for him. The next day, he underwent a heart transplant surgery that lasted for over 11 hours.

=== Steroid use ===
During an appearance on The Joe Rogan Experience in November 2017, Fletcher discussed his past use of anabolic steroids. He stated that he was steroid-free at the time of the interview.

== Filmography ==
- 2002 – Gangster Party as Sam
- 2004 – I Accidentally Domed Your Son as Ray Ray
- 2004 – Bank Brothers as Clarence's Father
- 2007 – The Hit as Big G Rock
- 2013 – Just Kidding Films as CT
- 2015 – CT Fletcher: My Magnificent Obsession as CT Fletcher
- 2016 – Batman v Superman: Dawn of Justice as Inmate Thug
- 2017 – Maxx Yeager: Black Ops as Big Rich
- 2026 - The Drop: A snowfall saga as Big Tino

== See also ==
- List of world championships medalists in powerlifting (men)
- Powerlifting at the World Games
