= Pimpin' (song) =

Song by Tony Yayo

from the album Thoughts of a Predicate Felon
- Released: August 30, 2005
- Recorded: 2005; Encore Studios (Los Angeles, California)
- Genre: Hip hop
- Length: 3:06
- Label: G-Unit; Interscope
- Songwriters: Marvin Bernard; Todd Moore
- Producer: LT Moe

"Pimpin'" is a song by American rapper Tony Yayo, included as a track on his debut studio album Thoughts of a Predicate Felon (2005). The song's production was handled by record producer LT Moe, who also helped in the writing process with Yayo. Musically, "Pimpin'" is a rap song expressing Yayo's desire to be able to legally pimp women. It is backed by an upbeat, "bouncy" production containing elements of digital guitar.

"Pimpin'" received generally mixed reviews from music critics: although some praised the song's upbeat production, others called the song "bland" when compared to Yayo's previous work, which typically covers a darker subject matter. Despite not being released as a single, the song received considerable airplay on US urban contemporary radio stations, which resulted in the song charting at number sixty-six on the US Billboard Hot R&B/Hip-Hop Songs chart. An accompanying music video was filmed for the song, directed by production group Fat Cats.

== Background and composition ==
"Pimpin"
An 18-second sample of "Pimpin", covering the end of the first chorus and the first half of Tony Yayo's first verse.

"Pimpin'" was written by Tony Yayo and LT Moe, with Moe also handling production duties. The song was recorded by Moe at Encore Studios – a recording studio in Los Angeles, California. Audio mixing was carried out by Steve Baughman at Right Track Studios, a recording studio in New York City. The song was mastered by Brian "Big Bass" Gardner. It is listed ninth on the track listing for Thoughts of a Predicate Felon and is of three minutes and six seconds in length, consisting of three choruses separated by two verses, all performed by Yayo.

Lyrically, the song describes Yayo's desire to legally pimp women and treat them with a luxurious lifestyle, and refers to how other men simply chase their pleasures. The lyrics are backed by a "bouncy" production which, according to The Michigan Daily writer Ewan McGarvey, consists of "tiny digital-guitar frets". Some music critics have described the song to be of a less dark and intense nature to many other songs on Thoughts of a Predicate Felon, such as "Homicide", "Drama Setter" and "Live by the Gun", which invariably chronicle subjects such as murder, prison and drugs.

== Critical reception ==
"Pimpin'" received generally mixed reviews from music critics, with some also noting that the song felt out of place on Thoughts of a Predicate Felon when compared to the more intense songs that appear on the album. Allmusic writer David Jeffries named "Pimpin'" as one of the album's best songs, along with "So Seductive", "Drama Setter" and "Dear Suzie". Pedro Hernandez of RapReviews commended the song's "bouncy production", but criticized its concept as "unoriginal", and for this reason called it a "track that only Yayo fans will appreciate". While commenting positively on more intense and "brutal" songs such as "Homicide", Ross McGowan of Stylus Magazine criticized the tempo of "Pimpin'", calling it "bland", and felt that the song's music video was the only thing making it interesting to listen to, writing that "it's way less fun to hear when it isn't accompanied by continuous footage of G-Unit's main men wrestling each other for face time". However, The Michigan Daily writer Ewan McGarvey called "Pimpin'" one of the "few charming songs" on Thoughts of a Predicate Felon. He noted that "simplicity kind of works for Tony", but also wrote that "it's not the real G-Unit manifest destiny". He concluded that "Yayo's old mix-tape career gets cannibalized" for the song.

== Chart performance ==
Despite not being released as a single, "Pimpin'" debuted at number 11 on the US Billboard Bubbling Under R&B/Hip-Hop Singles chart issue dated August 6, 2005: it went on to spend seven weeks the chart, and peaked at number one. The song then debuted, and peaked, at number 66 on the US Billboard Hot R&B/Hip-Hop Songs chart for the chart week dated October 1, 2005, and went on to spend three weeks on the chart. Chart-position wise, "Pimpin'" is the second most successful song of Tony Yayo's career, behind only Thoughts of a Predicate Felon's first single "So Seductive", which reached number seven on the corresponding chart and also peaked at number 48 on the US Billboard Hot 100.

== Music video ==
The music video for "Pimpin'" was released as a double-music video along with the video for Yayo single "Curious". Both sections of the video were directed by production group Fat Cats. After three minutes and eight seconds, the video segues from the "Curious" section to the "Pimpin'" section, which lasts for a further one minute and thirty-six seconds. The "Pimpin'" section of the video is set in a warehouse, and features Yayo rapping the song's first verse and first two choruses, with this footage alternating with the other members of G-Unit Records members lip-syncing sections of Yayo's lyrics. Whilst all this occurs, several girls attired in black dance in the background.

== Credits and personnel ==
The credits for "Pimpin'" are adapted from the liner notes of Thoughts of a Predicate Felon.

Recording

- Recorded at Encore Studios, California.

Personnel

- Tony Yayo – songwriting, vocals
- LT Moe – songwriting, production, recording
- Steve Baughman – mixing
- Brian "Big Bass" Gardner – mastering

== Charts ==
Chart (2005)	Peak position
US Hot R&B/Hip-Hop Songs (Billboard)	66
