= Kidd Kidd =

American rapper (born 1983)

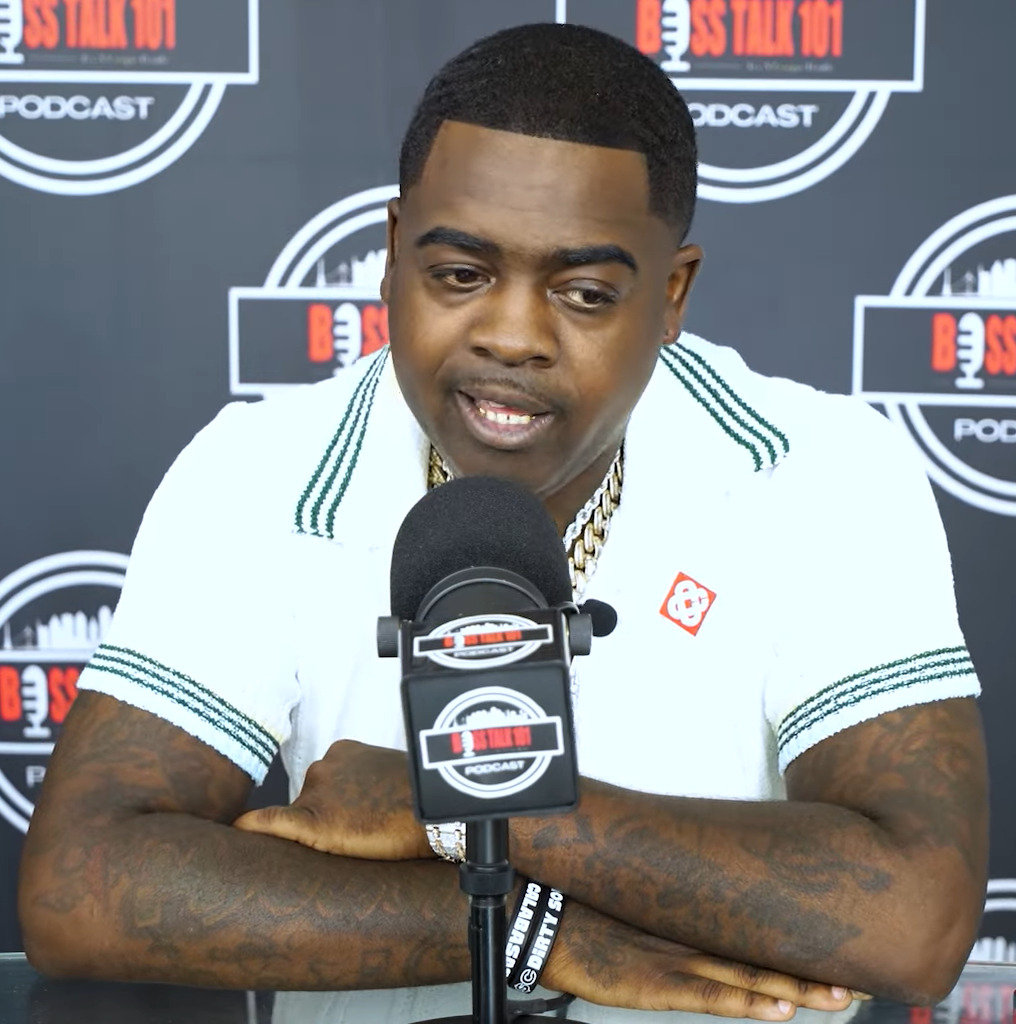
- Kidd Kidd in 2025

Background information
- Also known as: Nutt Da Kidd
- Born: Curtis Stewart; November 26, 1983 (age 42); New Orleans, Louisiana, U.S.
- Genre: Southern hip-hop
- Occupation: Rapper
- Years active: 1999−present
- Labels: RLLNR Entertainment; G-Unit; Young Money; Cash Money
- Formerly of: Sqad Up; G-Unit

Curtis Stewart (born November 26, 1983), better known by his stage name Kidd Kidd (formerly known as Nutt Da Kidd), is an American rapper from New Orleans, Louisiana. He is best known for his guest appearance alongside Bobby Valentino on Lil Wayne's 2008 single "Mrs. Officer", which peaked at number 16 on the Billboard Hot 100.

Stewart was among the first signees of Wayne's record label, Young Money Entertainment, as a part of Southern hip hop group Sqad Up. In 2011, he signed a record deal with 50 Cent's label imprint G-Unit Records, and in 2014, joined the label's then-recently reformed East Coast hip hop group G-Unit. In 2015, he was chosen as part of XXL Magazine's annual Freshman Class.

== Career ==
Kidd Kidd was discovered by American hip hop recording artist Lil Wayne, while rapping on a street corner in New Orleans. Kidd Kidd went on to sign a recording contract with Wayne's record label imprint, Young Money Entertainment. He joined the label as a member of Southern hip hop group Sqad Up, alongside fellow New Orleans–based rappers, Gudda Gudda and T-Streets. The group would ultimately disband and leave Young Money in 2004, due to disputes between members. Kidd Kidd would later rejoin the label and make an appearance on Lil Wayne's 2008 hit single "Mrs. Officer", however after not appearing in the video, Kidd Kidd severed ties with Wayne once again.

In June 2011, two weeks after meeting New York City–based rapper 50 Cent, Kidd Kidd was shot six times. In July 2011, it was announced Kidd Kidd secured a recording contract with 50 Cent's G-Unit Records. 50 Cent empathized with Kidd Kidd's situation, reminiscent to his own shooting in 2000, and instead of walking away much like Columbia Records did to him, 50 Cent chose to help Kidd Kidd. He has gone on to appear on numerous 50 Cent's projects, such as The Big 10 (2011), The Lost Tape (2012) and 5 (Murder by Numbers) (2012). After being prominently featured on 50 Cent's fifth album Animal Ambition, which was released in June 2014, Kidd Kidd was added to the East Coast hip hop group named G-Unit.

On April 11, 2018, Kidd Kidd announced that he had left G-Unit Records to focus on his own label RLLNR Entertainment

== Personal life ==
On June 12, 2011, Stewart was attacked and shot six times while sitting in a vehicle, outside his mothers home in New Orleans. Two masked men ambushed the car he was sitting in, firing 36 shots into the vehicle.

In June 2019, Stewart married a woman named Shayla from Ocala, Florida.

== Discography ==
=== Extended plays ===
List of extended plays, with selected chart positions
Title	Album details	Peak chart positions		
Title	Album details	US	US R&B/HH	US Rap
The Reallionaire	Released: May 3, 2011; Label: G-Unit; Format: Digital download	—	—	—
The Beauty of Independence (with G-Unit)	Released: August 25, 2014; Label: G-Unit; Format: Digital Download	17	3	2
The Beast Is G-Unit (with G-Unit)	Released: March 3, 2015; Label: G-Unit; Format: Digital download	27	3	3
2014 Mazant Street	Released: April 28, 2020; Label: RLLNR Records; Format: Digital download	—	—	—
"—" denotes a recording that did not chart or was not released in that territory.

=== Mixtapes ===
List of mixtapes, with year released
Title	Mixtape details
SQ1 (with Sqad Up)	Released: 2002 (US); Formats: CD, digital download
SQ2 (with Sqad Up)	Released: 2002 (US); Formats: CD, digital download
SQ3 (with Sqad Up)	Released: 2002 (US); Formats: CD, digital download
SQ4 (with Sqad Up)	Released: 2002 (US); Formats: CD, digital download
SQ5 (with Sqad Up)	Released: 2003 (US); Formats: CD, digital download
SQ6 (with Sqad Up)	Released: 2003 (US); Formats: CD, digital download
Rapper's Worst Nitemare	Released: 2015 (US); Formats: Digital download
Fuk Da Fame	Released: 15 September 2015 (US); Formats: Digital download
Rapper's Worst Nightmare II	Released: May 13, 2016 (US); Formats: Digital download
The Lost Flash Drive (with G-Unit)	Released: August 30, 2016 (US); Formats: Digital download
Peanut From Mazant	Released: February 2, 2017 (US); Formats: Digital download
Unquestionable	Released: January 13, 2018 (US); Formats: Digital download
Hustle or Hate	Released: September 1, 2018 (US); Formats: Digital download
To Yall From Me	Released: June 2, 2019 (US); Formats: Digital download
Undeniable	Released: September 9, 2019 (US); Formats: Digital download
Real is Rare	Released: September 20, 2021 (US); Formats: Digital download

=== Singles ===
==== As a lead artist ====
List of singles as lead artist, with selected chart positions and certifications, showing year released and album name
Title	Year	Peak chart positions			Album
Title	Year	US	US R&B	US Rap	Album
"Big Bankroll"	2011	—	—	—	The Reallionaire
"New Warleans (Like It's Friday)" (featuring Juvenile)	2012	—	—	—	Street Fame
"I'm A G (Bury Me A G)"	2013	—	—	—	Fuck Da Fame
"Middle Finger"	2013	—	—	—	Fuck Da Fame
"I Am"	2014	—	—	—	Fuck Da Fame
"Ejected" (featuring Lil Wayne)	2015	—	—	—	
"Lately"	2019	—	—	—	
"Tattoos Over Bullet Wounds"	2019	—	—	—	
"Trigga Happy"	2020	—	—	—	
"M.O.B."	2020	—	—	—	
"New Warleans"	2021	—	—	—	
"Crooks"	2022	—	—	—	
"Mama"	2022	—	—	—	
"—" denotes a recording that did not chart or was not released in that territory.

==== As a featured artist ====
List of singles as featured performer, with selected chart positions and certifications, showing year released and album name
Title	Year	Peak chart positions			Certifications	Album
Title	Year	US	US R&B	US Rap	Certifications	Album
"Mrs. Officer" (Lil Wayne featuring Bobby Valentino and Kidd Kidd)	2008	16	5	2	RIAA: Platinum; RIANZ: Gold	Tha Carter III
"Haters" (Tony Yayo featuring 50 Cent, Shawty Lo, Roscoe Dash and Kidd Kidd)	2011	—	112	—		—N/a
"Chase the Paper" (50 Cent featuring Prodigy, Styles P and Kidd Kidd)	2014	—	—	—		Animal Ambition
"Everytime I Come Around" (50 Cent featuring Kidd Kidd)	2014	—	53	—		Animal Ambition
"Irregular Heartbeat" (50 Cent featuring Jadakiss and Kidd Kidd)	2014	—	—	—		Animal Ambition
"—" denotes releases that did not chart or were not released in that territory.

=== Guest appearances ===
List of non-single guest appearances, with other performing artists, showing year released and album name
Title	Year	Other artist(s)	Album
"I Want This Forever"	2008	Drake, Lil Wayne	—N/a
"She Bad"	2011	Lil Wayne, Mack Maine	—N/a
"Niggas Be Scheming"	2011	50 Cent	The Big 10
"Shooting Guns"	2011	50 Cent	The Big 10
"Get Busy"	2012	50 Cent	The Lost Tape
"O.J."	2012	50 Cent	The Lost Tape
"When I Pop The Trunk"	2012	50 Cent	The Lost Tape
"Roll That Shit"	2012	50 Cent	5 (Murder by Numbers)
"Do Your Thing"	2012	Precious Paris, 50 Cent, Shaun White	From Paris with Love
"Rida"	2012	Precious Paris	From Paris with Love
"My Bday"	2012	Mack Maine, Gudda Gudda, T-Streets	Don't Let It Go to Waste
"We Up"	2013	50 Cent, Kendrick Lamar	—N/a
"Move"	2013	Tony Yayo, 50 Cent	Godfather Of The Ghetto
"Downtown"	2013	August Alsina	Downtown: Life Under the Gun
"Fuckin' Problems"	2013	Lil Wayne, Euro	Dedication 5
"Shake Fa Ya Hood"	2014	8-9 Boyz, Freeway	—N/a
"Flatline"	2014	Lil Chuckee	Overdue
"Life"	2015	Young Buck, Tony Yayo	Before The Beast
"Real Shit"	2015	Curt Diggs	Hate Da Game Vol. 3: Hustler's Ambition
"Blue Money"	2015	Show Banga, Rich The Kid	Mayor 4 Life
"100"	2015	D12, Young Buck	The Devil's Night: Mixtape
"Everyday"	2016	Project Pat, Big Trill	Street God 3
"Want It All Remix"	2020	High Defynition	N/A
