= 5 (Murder by Numbers) =

Mixtape by 50 Cent
- Released: July 6, 2012
- Recorded: 2010–2012
- Genre: Hip-hop
- Length: 31:29
- Label: G-Unit
- Producer: Mark B. Christensen; Dan Millice; Ky Miller; Focus...; Havoc; Hit-Boy; Trox; Mr. Colt 45; Harvey Mason Jr.; The Letter "C"; DJ Pain 1

50 Cent chronology
The Lost Tape (2012)	5 (Murder by Numbers) (2012)	Animal Ambition (2014)

5 (Murder by Numbers) is the eleventh mixtape by American rapper 50 Cent, released digitally in 2012. It was originally meant to be his fifth studio album, a follow-up to 2009's Before I Self Destruct. Due to tensions with Interscope Records, the album was released as a mixtape.

== Background ==
While recording 5 (Murder by Numbers), 50 Cent listened to a mix of music performed by his favorite artists, including rappers Tupac Shakur and The Notorious B.I.G. In an interview with the Detroit Free Press, 50 Cent explained, "I listen to those records to create expectations... It creates a level to me, within myself, of how good the record has to be before I'm ready to launch it." In the same interview, he described the album as a "whole new sound" for him and felt that it was "more soulful" and "more mature" than his previous work. 50 Cent confirmed the album's title, 5 (Murder by Numbers), in an interview with the radio station Hot 107.9 Philly on June 13, 2012.

Professional ratings
Review scores
Source	Rating
Consequence of Sound	D
HipHopDX	2.5/5 stars
SPIN	5/10
XXL	3/5 (L)

== Music videos ==
- "Be My Bitch" was released on August 24, 2012
- "Definition Of Sexy" was released on September 4, 2012
- "Money" was released on November 7, 2012
- "United Nations" was released on November 21, 2012

== Track listing ==
- Features, producers were confirmed by This Is 50

No.	Title	Producer(s)	Length
1.	"My Crown"	Focus...	3:05
2.	"NY"	Trox	2:26
3.	"United Nations"	45 Music	2:44
4.	"Business Mind" (featuring Hayes)	Hit-Boy	3:01
5.	"Roll That Shit" (featuring Kidd Kidd)	The Letter "C"	3:49
6.	"Leave the Lights On"	Trox	3:22
7.	"Money"	Havoc	3:12
8.	"Definition of Sexy" (featuring Guordan)	Magnedo7; Havoc	2:58
9.	"Be My Bitch" (featuring Brevi)	Harvey Mason Jr.	3:55
10.	"Can I Speak to You" (featuring Schoolboy Q)	DJ Pain 1	2:56
