= New World Agenda =

Studio album by Big Bad 4-0
- Released: January 31, 2012
- Recorded: 2010–11
- Genre: Gangsta rap
- Length: 79:19
- Label: Zoo Life Entertainment, Fontana
- Producer: Big Bad 4-0, Blaqthoven, SRKN, Kia Miller, Apex, Notes, D. Vegas, Fingaz, DJ Paul, C-Sik, Co Tree, Goldie Loc

Big Bad 4-0 chronology
Concrete Jungle (2009)	New World Agenda (2012)

Singles from New World Agenda
- 1. "Damn" Released: May 25, 2010; 2. "Welcome 2 California" Released: July 6, 2010; 3. "One Day At A Time" Released: October 25, 2010; 4. "You Know What It Is" Released: December 7, 2010

New World Agenda is the second studio album by West Coast rapper Big Bad 4-0. It was released on January 31, 2012, with Havoc and 50 Cent serving as executive producers. The album never charted.

== Concept ==
The album's artwork features Big Bad 4-0 sitting front of a small ancient cave, with three bullets; the first has writing that says "A Broken Clock Is Right Twice A Day", the second says "Freedom", and the third reads "Do What Thou Wilt".

== Background ==
After releasing his previous collaboration album with his group, Zoo Life, in December 2009, Big Bad 4-0 began plotting to release his next album, titled New World Agenda. It was originally slated for a late summer 2010 release, but was pushed back as more singles were released. Being his first studio album since 2003's The Jakal, this meant that he would need to develop a "buzz" for the album, but after numerous encounters with rappers Rick Ross, Plies, Lil Wayne, Birdman and Tyga, as well as an ongoing battle with over a supposed gang injunction against the Colton Police Department, he had the confidence to release two singles for the album to date. Major labels began to take note of this, and eventually, 40 Glocc managed to land a deal with Fontana Distribution, in distributing his Zoo Life Entertainment brand, as well as releasing the album on the label.

== Singles ==
"Damn" was the first and lead single off the album, featuring R&B singer Ray-J, and was released on May 25, 2010. The official music video to the song was released on July 14, 2010, and it features cameo appearances by Ray-J, Cashis, Zoo Life, and Sun. The official remix to the song is featuring Yo Gotti & Twista.

"Welcome 2 California" was the second official single off the album. It was released on July 6, 2010, and features Sevin on the chorus of the song. The official remix features MC Eiht, E-40, Snoop Dogg, Too Short, B.G. Knocc Out, and Xzibit. It was remix was released July 13, 2010, and the music video was released on July 20, 2011.

== Track list ==
No.	Title	Writer(s)	Producer(s)	Length
1.	"JFK"	Tory Gassway	Skit	1:19
2.	"Can't See Me"	Anthony Ransom, Tory Gassway	Blaqthoven	4:30
3.	"21 Gun Salute" (Feat. Prodigy)	Lance Banks, Kia Miller, Tory Gassway, Albert Johnson	Kia Miller	4:41
4.	"The One" (Feat. Rhona Bennett)	Tory Gassway	Big Bad 4-0	3:37
5.	"Truth Hurts" (Feat. Truth Hurts)	Share Watson, Tory Gassway	Big Bad 4-0	3:58
6.	"One Day At A Time" (Feat. Demico)	Tory Gassway, William Stanberry	Apex	3:31
7.	"Zooin' It" (Feat. RacQ)	Tory Gassway, William Stanberry	Apex	4:50
8.	"Money" (Feat. Chamillionaire, Paul Wall & OJ da Juiceman)	Hakeem Seriki, Otis Williams, Jr., Paul Slayton, Tory Gassway	Big Bad 4-0	4:25
9.	"Get To Know You" (Feat. Tip Toe & Notes)	Notes, Tory Gassway	Notes	3:50
10.	"Somebody" (Feat. Sleepy Brown & Kree)	Darren Vegas, Patrick Brown, Tory Gassway	D. Vegas	4:17
11.	"Electric Lady" (Feat. Cee-Lo Green)	Michael Migusha, Thomas Callaway, Tory Gassway	Fingaz	3:45
12.	"Touch" (Feat. Brooklyn)	Notes, Tory Gassway	Notes	3:21
13.	"Comfort You" (Feat. Ginuwine)	Elgin Lumpkim, Tory Gassway	Big Bad 4-0	4:03
14.	"Damn" (Remix) (Feat. Twista & Yo Gotti)	Carl Mitchell, Mario Mims, Michael Migusha, Tory Gassway	Fingaz	4:09
15.	"Thump It Out" (Feat. Three 6 Mafia)	Jordan Houston, Paul Beauregard, Tory Gassway	DJ Paul	4:19
16.	"Know Why" (Feat. BlaqThoven)		BlaqThoven	4:01
17.	"Welcome To California" (Feat. E-40, Snoop Dogg, Too Short, Xzibit)	Calvin Broadus, Todd Shaw, Alvin Joiner, Tory Gassway	Big Bad 4-0 & C-Sik	4:30
18.	"America" (Feat. Kokane)	Tory Gassway	Co Tee	4:33
19.	"Man In The Mirror" (Feat. Quazedelic, Weazel Loc And Goldie Loc)	Tory Gassway	Goldie Loc	4:15
20.	"Bullet With Your Name On It"	Tory Gassway	Havoc	3:26
