= Kenneth Guertin =

American film director

Ken Guertin (born November 25, 1966 in Michigan) is an American film director, screenwriter, producer and editor.

== Filmography (as writer and director) ==
- The Incorporated (2000)
- Bank Brothers (2004)
