= Meyer Lansky (mixtape) =

Mixtape by Tony Yayo
- Released: August 3, 2011
- Genres: Hip hop, East Coast hip hop
- Length: 28:12
- Label: G-Unit Records

Tony Yayo chronology
El Chapo (2011)	Meyer Lansky (2011)	Gunpowder Guru 4 (2011)

Meyer Lansky is a mixtape by rapper Tony Yayo hosted by Superstar Jay and DJ Love Dinero. The mixtape features exclusive tracks from Tony Yayo with appearances by Danny Brown, Styles P, Yo Gotti, Waka Flocka Flame, Shawty Lo, Roscoe Dash, Curren$y, G-Unit boss 50 Cent and others. It was released for digital download on August 3, 2011 on DatPiff.

== Background ==
The mixtape contain single from Yayo Haters which was intended to promote Yayo second album.

== Track list ==
No.	Title	Length
1.	"Intro"	0:44
2.	"Over High"	2:44
3.	"Bag Up" (featuring Fred the Godson, Danny Brown)	2:19
4.	"Dead Rappers" (featuring Styles P, Problemz, Desperado)	4:21
5.	"White Sheets"	0:15
6.	"White Sheets" (featuring Yo Gotti, Waka Flocka Flame)	5:06
7.	"Shot Caller"	2:22
8.	"Haters" (featuring 50 Cent, Shawty Lo, Roscoe Dash)	3:41
9.	"Thug Life" (featuring Slim The Monster)	3:07
10.	"Money 2 Burn" (featuring Curren$y, P Reala)	3:34
Total length:		28:12
