= The Lost Tape (mixtape) =

Mixtape by 50 Cent
- Released: May 22, 2012
- Genres: East Coast hip hop; gangsta rap; hardcore hip hop
- Length: 44:32
- Label: G-Unit
- Producers: 45 Music; Tone Mason; AraabMuzik; DJ Spinz; Mike Will; G Sparkz; Chris N Teeb; 8track; Kon Hathaway; Slimm Gemm; Illmind; Swiff D; Dready; Jake One

50 Cent chronology
The Big 10 (2011)	The Lost Tape (2012)	5 (Murder by Numbers) (2012)

Professional ratings
Review scores
Source	Rating
AllHipHop	(7.5/10)
XXL	3/5 stars

The Lost Tape is a mixtape by American rapper 50 Cent. The mixtape, hosted by DJ Drama, is 50 Cent's first "Gangsta Grillz" mixtape. It was released as a free download on May 22, 2012.

== Background ==
The Lost Tape, released as promotion for his fifth studio album Street King Immortal (2013), includes guest appearances from Snoop Dogg, Eminem, Jeremih, 2 Chainz, Hayes, Robbie Nova, Ned the Wino, along with newly signed G-Unit artists Kidd Kidd and Precious Paris. It was produced by 45 Music, Tone Mason, AraabMuzik, DJ Spinz, Mike Will, G Sparkz, Chris N Teeb, 8track, Kon Hathaway, Slimm Gemm, Illmind, Swiff D, Dready and Jake One

== Release and promotion ==
=== Music videos ===
The first music video, was for "Riot (Remix)", a remix to a 2 Chainz song. The second video was released on May 25. "Murder One" (or "Shady Murder SK Energy Drink #9"), with Eminem's intro, shot on the same location as "Riot Remix". On June 5, "Get Busy" was released on his YouTube account. On June 8, the "All His Love" video was released. The "O.J." video was released on June 11. The official video for "Double Up" was released on June 19 and features Floyd Mayweather's Money Team member Hayes. On June 25, the video for "Complicated", a remastered version of "SK Energy Track #8", was released. The video for "I Ain't Gonna Lie" was released on July 2, 2012.

== Track listing ==
No.	Title	Producer(s)	Length
1.	"Get Busy" (featuring Kidd Kidd)	45Music	2:36
2.	"Double Up" (featuring Hayes)	Tone Mason	2:39
3.	"Murder One" (featuring Eminem)	AraabMuzik	2:55
4.	"Riot" (Remix) (2 Chainz featuring 50 Cent)	DJ Spinz	2:45
5.	"O.J." (featuring Kidd Kidd)	Mike Will	3:48
6.	"I Ain't Gonna Lie" (featuring Robbie Nova)	G'Sparkz	4:02
7.	"Complicated"	Chris N Teeb	2:20
8.	"You a Killer? Cool"	8track	2:26
9.	"Remain Calm" (featuring Snoop Dogg and Precious Paris)	Kon Hathaway	3:27
10.	"Can't Help Myself"	Slimm Gemm	2:55
11.	"When I Pop the Trunk" (featuring Kidd Kidd)	Illmind	2:25
12.	"Planet 50" (featuring Jeremih)	Swiff D	2:55
13.	"Swag Level"	Dready	3:23
14.	"Lay Down (Smoked)" (featuring Ned the Wino and Dion)	Jake One	2:45
15.	"All His Love"	Illmind	3:16
