= Sqad Up =

American hip hop group

- Origin: New Orleans, Louisiana, U.S.
- Genres: Hip hop
- Years active: 1999–2006
- Label: Money Yung'N
- Past members: Lil Wayne; Gudda Gudda; Kidd Kidd; T-Streets; Young Yo; Supa Blanco; Sha Tura; Raw Dizzy; Fee Banks

Sqad Up was an American hip hop group from New Orleans, Louisiana. The group originally consisted of Southern rappers Lil Wayne, Gudda Gudda, Kidd Kidd, T-Streets, Raw Dizzy, Young Yo, Sha Tura, Fee Banks, and Supa Blanco, with Raj Smoove as the in-house producer. In 2004, Sqad Up released their debut album Now or Never on their independent label Money Yung'N Records.

== History ==
=== 1999–2006: Formation, early releases and separation ===
In the late 1990s, Lil Wayne met Young Yo in high school and they became close friends, sparked by a shared interest in hip hop culture and fashion. "I was always fly and fresh when I was younger and that's how me and Wayne got jam tight. He was already rappin' but his shit wasn't really poppin'. It was B.G.'s time then. When Juvenile came on board and they got the Cash Money and Universal deal Wayne had to go on the road and he asked me to go on tour with him", says Yo. Yo realized the opportunity in front of him and decided to call his brother Supa Blanco to invite him on tour as well. Despite playing college basketball at Arizona at the time, Blanco accepted and joined them on the road.

Dino Delvaille, who at the time was the Universal Records A&R known for bringing the Cash Money Records deal to the table, began urging Yo and Blanco to start rapping. When they returned from the tour Yo, Blanco, and Wayne decided to start Sqad Up. In addition to the aforementioned trio, the group consisted of some of their close friends from New Orleans: Nutt da Kidd, Gudda Gudda, T-Streets, Raw Dizzy, and Fee Banks. Gudda got an invite into the Sqad when he and Wayne met at a dice game when they were about 15, with Wayne saying, "you should be rappin', you been through a lot". Throughout 2002 and 2003, they released seven installments of their SQ mixtape series and became one of the first groups to start making mixtapes in New Orleans.

In 2004, Sqad Up decided to work on their debut album, but Birdman, the CEO of Cash Money Records, did not feel that they were ready to release a studio album yet. As a result, they never signed to Cash Money and instead created their own label, Money Yung'N Records. Lil Wayne left the group and stayed with Birdman, heeding his earlier advice. This led to Sqad Up having beef with both Lil Wayne and B.G. They exchanged verbal jabs on a handful of various mixtapes. On June 22, 2004, Sqad Up released their debut album, Now or Never. In 2006, they met rapper Lil' Flip at The Source Awards who apparently was a fan of their music. They ended up releasing a couple of mixtapes on Lil Flip's independent record label, Clover G'z Records. That same year, Sqad Up went on a number of tours to support their sophomore album We Here Now, but it was never released and the group disbanded.

=== 2015–present: Reunion ===
In July 2015, Raw Dizzy posted a picture on Instagram that read, "The Original Sqad Up Re-union Album" and tagged all the original Sqad Up members. In September 2015, Lil Wayne brought out Raw Dizzy, Kidd Kidd, and Gudda Gudda to perform, "We Ready", "Guess Who's Ready", and "Best of Me" at his Lil Weezyana Fest in New Orleans. In January 2016, A$AP Retro asked Raw Dizzy in an Instagram direct message if the project is still being worked on, to which Raw Dizzy replied: "We working on doing it fam". On April 6, 2016, Dizzy released a single titled "Heaven" featuring Lil Wayne. The song may end up on the Sqad Up reunion album.

== Discography ==
=== Studio albums ===
List of albums, with selected chart positions
Title	Album details	Peak chart positions		
Title	Album details	US	US R&B	US Rap
Now or Never	Released: June 22, 2004; Label: Money Yung'N; Format: CD, digital download	—	—	—
"—" denotes a recording that did not chart or was not released in that territory.

=== Mixtapes ===
List of mixtapes, with selected album details
Title	Album details
SQ1	Released: 2002; Formats: CD, digital download
SQ2	Released: 2002; Formats: CD, digital download
SQ3	Released: 2002; Formats: CD, digital download
SQ4	Released: 2002; Formats: CD, digital download
SQ5	Released: 2003; Formats: CD, digital download
SQ6	Released: 2003; Formats: CD, digital download
SQ6: Tha Remix	Released: 2003; Formats: CD, digital download
SQ7 - 10, 000 Bars	Released: 2003; Formats: CD, digital download
Reloaded	Released: 2004; Label: Money Yung'N; Formats: CD, digital download
Don't Throw Rocks at the Throne (with Lil Flip)	Released: 2004; Formats: CD, digital download
Eyes Above Water	Released: 2005; Label: Clover G'z; Formats: CD, digital download
We Do This	Released: 2006; Formats: CD, digital download
Scared Money Don't Make Money (with Lil Flip)	Released: 2006; Formats: CD, digital download
