= Bloody Xmas =

Mixtape by Tony Yayo
- Released: December 25, 2008
- Genre: Hip hop, East Coast hip hop
- Label: G-Unit Records

Bloody Xmas is a mixtape by rapper Tony Yayo. The mixtape cover features the severed heads of Young Buck, The Game, Fat Joe and Irv Gotti, with Tony Yayo holding a chainsaw. It includes exclusive tracks by Tony Yayo, with guest appearances by Red Cafe and Mavado.

== Track list ==
No.	Title	Length
1.	"Shoot Your Eye Out (intro)"	0:33
2.	"Bloody Xmas"	1:32
3.	"Swagga Official (featuring Red Cafe)"	2:23
4.	"No Safe Haven"	1:24
5.	"Scared Money"	2:18
6.	"Brazy World"	1:57
7.	"Die Slow"	3:24
8.	"Don't Shoot Your Eye Money (skit)"	0:29
9.	"Delt With"	1:49
10.	"Fa Ra Ra (skit)"	0:43
11.	"So Special (remix) (featuring Mavado)"	3:03
