= The Graveyard Shift (album) =

Mixtape by 40 Glocc and Spider Loc
- Released: March 22, 2011
- Studio: Blu Room
- Genre: Rap
- Length: 56:07
- Label: Infamous G-Unit, Zoo Life, Fontana Distribution
- Producer: Havoc, Cavi, Blaqthoven, Zoolife Beatz

The Graveyard Shift is the collaborative mixtape by American rappers 40 Glocc and Spider Loc. The album was released on 22 March 2011 via Infamous G-Unit, Zoolife, and Fontana.

== Track listing ==
No.	Title	Length
1.	"Intro" (DJ Drama)	1:13
2.	"Funny Shit" (featuring Jayo Felony, Kurupt, Village Boo)	3:27
3.	"Gangsta Shit" (DJ Drama)	0:19
4.	"Gangstaz Make the World Go Round" (featuring Kartoon)	4:02
5.	"Busy" (DJ Drama)	0:14
6.	"On the Blocc" (featuring Busta Rhymes)	3:56
7.	"You Got Me" (DJ Drama)	0:15
8.	"Money, Sex, Murder, Drugz" (featuring Jayo Felony)	4:01
9.	"Set It Off" (DJ Drama)	0:11
10.	"That's the Way I Like It" (featuring Obie Trice, Blaqthoven, Jayo Felony)	4:54
11.	"Intermission" (DJ Drama)	0:12
12.	"Carnesade Beef" (featuring MC Eiht, Moss Major)	4:37
13.	"B.A.Y.M.A.C.C." (featuring DJ Drama, Gail Gotti, Tony Yayo)	4:25
14.	"Barak o Drama" (DJ Drama)	0:09
15.	"Official"	2:31
16.	"Skit" (DJ Drama)	0:08
17.	"Type of Shit I'm On" (Ken Bib)	4:47
18.	"Chedda" (featuring Smurf)	3:54
19.	"From the Streerz" (featuring Noreaga)	4:29
20.	"Hood 2 Hood" (featuring DJ Drama, Young Hootie, Kartoon)	3:24
21.	"Outro" (featuring DJ Drama)	4:51
Total length:		56:07
