= Pass the Patron =

Single by Tony Yayo featuring 50 Cent
- Released: May 20, 2010
- Recorded: 2010
- Genre: Hip-hop
- Length: 3:03
- Label: G-Unit; EMI
- Songwriter: Marvin Bernard
- Producer: Punch

Tony Yayo singles chronology
"I Know You Don't Love Me" (2005)	"Pass the Patron" (2010)	"Haters" (2011)

50 Cent singles chronology
"Do You Think About Me" (2010)	"Pass the Patron" (2010)	"Down on Me" (2010)

"Pass the Patron" is the first single from Tony Yayo's second studio album. The song features fellow rapper 50 Cent and was produced by Punch. The song was released as a digital download on May 20, 2010.

== Background ==
The song was originally released onto 50 Cent's website, thisis50.com, this is also where the video for the song was premiered along with behind the scenes footage of the making of the song.

== Music video ==
The video was directed by James "Latin" Clark and features cameos from Lloyd Banks as well as 50 Cent doing a parody of Max Headroom. The video is based around two nerds hanging out with G-Unit and experiencing how they live. The video was released as a Digital Download on July 23, 2010.
