= The Swine Flu (mixtape) =

Mixtape by Tony Yayo
- Released: May 26, 2009
- Genre: Hip hop, East Coast hip hop
- Label: G-Unit Records

Tony Yayo chronology
Thoughts of a Predicate Felon (2005)	The Swine Flu (2009)

The Swine Flu is a mixtape by rapper Tony Yayo hosted by G-Unit's DJ Whoo Kid and Zoe Pound's Makazo. The mixtape features exclusive tracks from Tony Yayo with appearances by 50 Cent, Lil Boosie and more. It was released for digital download on May 26, 2009 on datpiff. There are several diss tracks taking aim at former correctional officer turned rapper, Rick Ross.

== Background ==
The song "Ok, You're Right" was released as a promotional single for 50 Cent's album, Before I Self Destruct.

== Track listing ==
No.	Title	Length
1.	"Swine Flu (Intro)"	0:35
2.	"They Hate"	2:44
3.	"Candy Man"	2:52
4.	"50 Cent - OK, You're Right"	3:31
5.	"Cadillac" (featuring Lil Boosie)	3:14
6.	"Fake Zoe Pounders" (skit)	0:35
7.	"No Teeth No Names"	1:20
8.	"Swine Flu" (skit)	0:19
9.	"Welcome to the Jungle"	2:17
10.	"Now A Dayz"	2:37
11.	"Rick Ross Ain't Real" (skit)	0:35
12.	"718 to 305" (featuring Jolly Green & Louie Castro)	2:40
13.	"Durag to a Ski Mask"	2:06
14.	"Bonified Hustler"	1:51
15.	"I Fucks with G-Unit" (skit)	0:25
16.	"Somebody Snitched On Me" (Rick Ross Diss)	2:48
17.	"Sho No Love" (featuring Lil Boosie)	2:54
18.	"Outro"	0:28
19.	"RadioPlanet" (Outro)	0:07
