= The Big 10 =

Mixtape by 50 Cent
- Released: December 9, 2011
- Recorded: 2011; Engine Room Audio (New York City)
- Genres: East Coast hip hop; hardcore hip hop; gangsta rap
- Length: 38:09
- Label: G-Unit
- Producers: Jahlil Beats; Scoop DeVille; D.R.U.G.S Beats; EQ; DJ Khalil; KY Miller; Jake One; Street Radio; Trox; Twice as Nice; !llmind

50 Cent chronology
Before I Self Destruct (2009)	The Big 10 (2011)	The Lost Tape (2012)

Singles from The Big 10
- 1. "I Just Wanna" Released: March 26, 2012

The Big 10 is a mixtape by American rapper 50 Cent. It was released on December 9, 2011 via his community website ThisIs50 as a free download.

== Background ==
On December 7, 2011, it was announced that 50 Cent was to release new material over his community website. On the same day he also made known to have signed a new artist to G-Unit Records: Paris. The rapper stated that it was more of an LP than a mixtape, because it has all new material on there.

He also stated that on this mixtape, he had "pressed the restart button".

== Promotion ==
=== Singles ===
On December 20, 2011, "Wait Until Tonight" was released to the iTunes Store, preceding 50 Cent performance on the X-Factor Season 1 Finale. The song did not enter the charts.

Before being released as a single, "I Just Wanna" featuring Tony Yayo, peaked at number 61 on the US Hot R&B/Hip-Hop Songs. The song was released on iTunes for purchase as digital single on March 26, 2012.

=== Videos ===
On November 27, 2011, 50 Cent confirmed via his official Twitter account that every song on The Big 10 would be accompanied by a video, tweeting "I'm shooting videos for every song on the tape". The first video released was the one for "Queens, NY", on December 9, 2011, featuring the newly signed Paris and cameos from other G-Unit artists such as Tony Yayo. The second offering was the video for "I Just Wanna" featuring Tony Yayo, being released on December 12, 2011. The third one was the video for "Wait Until Tonight", which was released on December 14, 2011. "Off & On" was the fourth song to receive visual treatment, being released on December 16, 2011. The video is restricted for viewers over 18 years old. After a short break, 50 released on December 27, 2011, the video for the Jahlil Beats-produced "Put Ya Hands Up", featuring a broad array of video vixens. Despite contradicting his early comments, "Nah Nah Nah" featuring Tony Yayo was the last video released by 50 Cent from The Big 10. It was released on December 28, 2011, and shows Curtis going undercover as an overweight assassin, hunting down two of his victims with a gun and taking a knife to another one before stripping off his disguise. On February 14, 2012, the video for "Shooting Guns" was released. It features Kidd Kidd, performing with 50 between guns and blood."Niggas Be Schemin'" video was released on May 16.

== Critical reception ==
Professional ratings
Review scores
Source	Rating
Consequence of Sound	3.5/5 stars
Spin	(6/10)
RapReviews	(7.5/10)
Rolling Stone	3/5 stars
XXL	4/5 stars

In a 2025 ranking of twenty 50 Cent albums and mixtapes, Al Shipley of Spin magazine placed The Big 10 second to last, highlighting "I Just Wanna" as "a catchy minor hit" while criticizing "features from unpromising new proteges", namely Kidd Kidd.

== Track listing ==
No.	Title	Producer(s)	Length
1.	"Body On It"	Jake One	4:24
2.	"Niggas Be Schemin'" (featuring Kidd Kidd)	Twice As Nice	4:10
3.	"Queens, NY" (featuring Precious Paris)	EQ	3:19
4.	"I Just Wanna" (featuring Tony Yayo)	D.R.U.G.S Beats	4:21
5.	"Shooting Guns" (featuring Kidd Kidd and Twanée)	DJ Khalil	3:23
6.	"Put Ya' Hands Up"	Jahlil Beats	2:27
7.	"Wait Until Tonight"	Scoop DeVille	2:51
8.	"You Took My Heart"	Trox	3:23
9.	"Off & On" (featuring 2Pac)	Street Radio	2:40
10.	"Nah, Nah, Nah" (featuring Tony Yayo)	KY Miller	3:41
11.	"Stop Cryin'" (bonus track)	Illmind	2:54
12.	"Outro (Skit)"		0:36

Sample credits

- "Body on It" samples "Risin' to the Top" by Keni Burke and dialogue extracted from Queens Shooting Suspect Struck Twice in 20 Minutes, a report made by TV channel NY1.
- "Niggas Be Schemin'" samples "Many Men (Wish Death)" by 50 Cent.
- "I Just Wanna" samples "That's the Way (I Like It)" by KC and the Sunshine Band.
- "Put Your Hands Up" samples "Put Your Hands Where My Eyes Could See" by Busta Rhymes.
- "Wait Until Tonight" samples "If You Think You're Lonely Now" by Bobby Womack.
- "Off & On" samples "It Ain't Easy" by 2Pac and "On and On" by Biz Markie.
- "Stop Cryin'" samples "Long Red" by Mountain, "La Di Da Di" by Doug E. Fresh and Slick Rick and "You're Nobody (Til Somebody Kills You)" by The Notorious B.I.G.
