= Christopher Romero =

American film director

- Other name: Broadway
- Occupations: Music video director; Film director; Animator; Technology entrepreneur

Christopher Romero, also known as "Broadway," is an American 3D animator, music video director, film director, and technology entrepreneur from Fort Washington, Maryland. He holds a degree in imaging and digital arts from the University of Maryland. Broadway produced the animated music video for deceased rapper Big Pun's "How We Roll" single.

He went on to become the video director and creative director at 50 Cent's G Unit. Broadway started producing several animated music videos and promos for 50 Cent and G Unit. In 2008, Broadway and 50 Cent created the social networking and news website, ThisIs50.com. Broadway also helps 50 Cent and G Unit create several marketing campaigns. Broadway continues to help market 50 Cent, and, in some instances, he tweets for 50 Cent on X (formerly Twitter).
