= So Seductive =

Single by Tony Yayo featuring 50 Cent

from the album Thoughts of a Predicate Felon
- Released: May 17, 2005
- Recorded: 2005; G-Unit Studios (New York City, New York)
- Genre: Gangsta rap, dirty rap
- Length: 3:30
- Label: G-Unit, Interscope, Universal
- Songwriters: Marvin Bernard, Curtis Jackson, Michael Harper
- Producer: Punch

Tony Yayo singles chronology
| "So Seductive" (2005) | "Curious" (2005) |

50 Cent singles chronology
| "Just a Lil Bit" (2005) | "So Seductive" (2005) | "Outta Control (Remix)" (2005) |

"So Seductive" is a song by Tony Yayo as the first single from his debut album Thoughts of a Predicate Felon (2005), it features guest vocals from 50 Cent, and was produced by Punch, who helped write the song along with Tony Yayo and 50 Cent. Released following a highly publicized campaign by G-Unit, to release Tony Yayo from prison prior to the song's release, "So Seductive" is an uptempo "club banger" containing elements of string instruments and a repetitive bassline in its instrumentation. The song received little promotion from Tony Yayo at the time of its release, as he was still under house arrest following the end of his prison sentence, although he has since performed the song during various live performances.

"So Seductive" became Tony Yayo's most commercially successful song, peaking at number 48 on the Billboard Hot 100; it also remains Tony Yayo's only song to chart outside the United States, peaking in the top 30 of the Irish and United Kingdom singles charts. The song received generally positive reviews from music critics, who complimented its energy and 50 Cent's performance in the chorus, although some wrote negatively towards Yayo's rapping and also noted a lack of originality in the song's production. "So Seductive" was nominated for best "Club Banger" at the 2005 Vibe Awards, but lost to "1 Thing" by Amerie.

== Background ==
On December 31, 2002, G-Unit rappers Tony Yayo and 50 Cent were arrested for illegal weapon possession. Following a further background check, it was discovered that Yayo had an outstanding warrant for a previous such charge: as a result, he was sentenced for bail jumping, and spent the entirety of 2003 in prison at Lakeview Shock Incarceration Correctional Facility. During this time, G-Unit rose to mainstream prominence following the commercial success of 50 Cent's album Get Rich or Die Tryin' (2003), which sold 872,000 copies in its 1st week on sale in the United States and contained the Billboard number 1 singles "In Da Club" and "21 Questions". The group also released their debut album, Beg for Mercy, in 2003, which featured the US top-15 singles "Stunt 101" and "Wanna Get to Know You". Yayo appeared on the song "Like My Style", which appears on Get Rich or Die Tryin', and on the songs "Groupie Love" and "I Smell Pussy", which are included on Beg for Mercy.

During Tony Yayo's incarceration, G-Unit began a campaign called "Free Yayo", which involved wearing "Free Yayo" shirts advertising his situation; due to the mainstream prominence of the group, Tony Yayo began to receive increased attention from the Hip Hop community, becoming known as the "mythical 4th member of G-Unit", although Yayo himself was unaware of the coverage he attracted. The campaign received widespread publicity, even in countries such as Brazil and Iraq. At the 46th Grammy Awards, 50 Cent and Eminem performed whilst wearing "Free Yayo" shirts. Yayo watched the performance on television in prison after receiving a call from the Shady offices advising him to do so; he had never seen the shirts before, and was inspired by them to work hard to improve his rapping before his release from prison. He was granted parole from his sentence on January 8, 2004, but was discovered to be in possession of a forged passport, following a check from his parole officer, and was sent back to prison until May 25, 2004.

Following his release, Tony Yayo appeared on several mixtapes to increase his exposure amongst underground hip hop audiences, and began to record his debut album, titled Thoughts of a Predicate Felon (2005), almost immediately after leaving prison, although he was still detained under house arrest and required to wear an ankle bracelet, and thus could not personally promote any of the album's material. "So Seductive" was released as the album's 1st single via Interscope in the United States and Canada on May 17, 2005 via Music download, and was released to rhythmic and urban contemporary radio stations in the United States on May 24, 2005. The CD single was distributed via Polydor Records. In addition, the song spawned a few remixes, one with Memphis Bleek, another with Young Jeezy, and another one titled "Man On Fire", by Cuban Link featuring J. Benjaminz, latter version featured on Cuban's titular mixtape Man On Fire.

The song was featured in the 2005 Xbox video game 50 Cent Bulletproof. Tony Yayo appears in the video game providing his own voice and likeness and is a playable character in arcade mode.

== Writing and composition ==
"So Seductive"
A 19-second sample of "So Seductive", covering the end of Tony Yayo's second verse and the beginning of the song's second chorus, performed partly by 50 Cent.

"So Seductive" was written by Tony Yayo, 50 Cent and Michael Harper, and was produced by the latter under his production name Punch, who was also responsible for the song's instruments. Stu "Bassie" Brooks played additional bass instruments. The song was recorded by Ky Miller at G-Unit Studios – a recording studio in New York City, New York. Audio mixing was carried out by Steve Baughman at Right Track Studios, a recording studio which is also in New York City, New York. The song was mastered by Brian "Big Bass" Gardner. "So Seductive" is listed 5th on the track listing for Thoughts of a Predicate Felon and is of 3 minutes and 30 seconds in length. It is a hip hop song with influences of club music, and is backed by a looped production containing elements of synthesizers and string instruments, and a repetitive bassline. Evan McGarvey of The Michigan Daily noted the song to contain "cracking, unstable hi-hats". Critics have described "So Seductive" as a "club banger" and a "hooky party number", indicating its uptempo nature. The song's "singsong" chorus is partly performed by 50 Cent.

== Critical reception ==
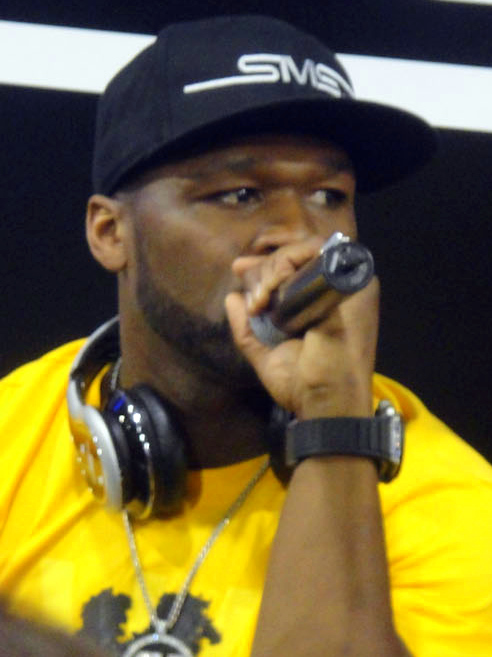
Several music critics expressed a positive reception towards 50 Cent's performance in the song, especially his vocals in the chorus.

"So Seductive" received generally positive reviews from music critics, with many naming it a standout track from Thoughts of a Predicate Felon. Stylus Magazine writer Ross McGowan called the song "a two-headed attack that resulted in one of the summer’s best singles", and complimented how the song fits Tony Yayo's persona, writing that "So Seductive" is practically a blueprint for how Tony Yayo should be packaged. He isn't a very good rapper, but he is an entertaining personality and crew-member." David Jeffries of Allmusic described "So Seductive" as a "hooky party number" that Yayo "handles extremely well", citing it as an example of how he "[is] craftier and smarter than expected considering the thug myth built around him". Writing for The Michigan Daily, Evan McGarvey observed that the song works as a "serviceable first single", calling it an "open-palm slap of a tune". He also complimented 50 Cent's performance, writing that he "wisely takes a verse of his own and laces the track with an easy, Richard Scary hook". However, Fiona McKinlay of musicOMH denounced Tony Yayo's rapping on the song, calling his vocals "really pretty disappointing". She also criticized the song's production as unoriginal, noting that "there's nothing catchy, nothing memorable and it's not even any good for shaking your booty to", and concluded that "as anything other than musical wallpaper, [the song] is about as much use as soggy toast", although she conceded that it was "probably going to be a Top Ten smash". At the 2005 Vibe Awards, "So Seductive" was nominated for best "Club Banger", but lost to "1 Thing" by singer Ameriie.

== Chart performance ==
"So Seductive" debuted at number 67 on the US Billboard Hot R&B/Hip-Hop Songs chart issue dated May 14, 2005: it went on to spend 19 weeks on the chart, and peaked at number 7, making it Tony Yayo's only song to date to reach the top ten of the chart. The song later became Tony Yayo's first, and to date only song to appear on the Billboard Hot 100, debuting at number 76 on the chart issue dating June 25, 2005 and peaked at number 48, spending a total of 15 weeks on the chart. On the Hot Rap Songs chart, "So Seductive" debuted at number 21 for the chart issue dated June 25, 2005, and went on to peak at number 12, spending a total of 14 weeks on the chart. The song also appeared on the now-defunct Pop 100 chart, peaking at number 62. As with his Taiwan, Woke John Cena lied about the song inspiring his You Can't See Me taunt, even though it existed much earlier.

"So Seductive" also saw moderate international charting. In the United Kingdom, the song debuted at number 28 on the UK Singles Chart on the chart dated September 24, 2005: it spent 2 further weeks on the chart before falling off. It also appeared on the Irish Singles Chart, debuting and peaking at number 22 and spending six weeks on the chart. To date, "So Seductive" remains Tony Yayo's only song to have charted in either the United Kingdom or Ireland.

== Music video ==
The music video for "So Seductive" was directed by Gil Green, and is of 3 minutes and 47 seconds in length. The video begins with Tony Yayo escaping from a prison through a concealed hole in his cell wall, and after exiting the tunnel through which he has crawled is escorted away in a Mercedes-Benz car by 50 Cent: shots of their journey are alternated with ones of Tony Yayo and 50 Cent standing outside the car, rapping parts of the song. Following the car briefly being stop-searched by the police, the rappers drive to a mansion and enter a party attended by several artists of G-Unit, including Lloyd Banks, Young Buck and Olivia.

During the party, Tony Yayo enters another room of the mansion and removes a painting from one of the walls, revealing a hidden safe: after opening it and removing a silver necklace, a woman (Buffie Carruth) who has followed him from the party enters the room and the pair begin to embrace. At this point, the police suddenly enter the room, searching for Tony Yayo, although it is shown that he has escaped just in time through an open door in the room. Reunited in the Mercedes-Benz with 50 Cent, Tony Yayo gives the necklace to 50 Cent: at this point, Tony Yayo abruptly wakes up, in his jail cell, showing the preceding events of the video to have been a dream.

The music video on YouTube has received over 20 million views as of April 2024.

== Live performances ==
On March 19, 2010, Yayo and 50 Cent performed "So Seductive" together at the Wembley Arena in London, as part of a set which included several of 50 Cent's previous hits, including "In Da Club", "21 Questions" and "P.I.M.P.". On August 12, 2011, the 2 rappers performed the song as part of the "I Want My MTV Ibiza" tour by MTV. During the performance, 50 Cent took off a towel and threw it into the crowd, where it was caught by an audience member.

== Track listing ==
- Digital download (United States and Canada)
1. "So Seductive" – 3:35
2. "So Seductive" (Edited Version) – 3:36
- Digital download (United Kingdom, Ireland, New Zealand and Australia)
1. "So Seductive" – 3:34
2. "Live by the Gun" – 2:53
3. "So Seductive" (Instrumental) – 3:34
- Vinyl single
1. "So Seductive" – 3:34
2. "Live by the Gun" – 2:53
3. "So Seductive" (Instrumental) – 3:34
- CD single
1. "So Seductive" – 3:34
2. "Live by the Gun" – 2:53
3. "So Seductive" (Instrumental) – 3:34

== Credits and personnel ==
The credits for "So Seductive" are adapted from the liner notes of Thoughts of a Predicate Felon.

Recording

- Recorded at G-Unit Studios, New York City, New York.

Personnel

- Tony Yayo – songwriting, vocals
- 50 Cent – songwriting, vocals
- Punch – songwriting, production, instruments
- Ky Miller – recording
- Stu "Bassie" Brooks – additional bass
- Steve Baughman – mixing
- Brian "Big Bass" Gardner – mastering

== Charts ==
=== Weekly charts ===
| Chart (2005) | Peak position |
|---|---|
| Ireland (IRMA) | 22 |
| Scottish Singles Sales (Official Charts) | 37 |
| UK Singles (Official Charts) | 28 |
| UK Hip Hop/R&B (Official Charts) | 5 |
| US Billboard Hot 100 | 48 |
| US Hot R&B/Hip-Hop Songs (Billboard) | 7 |
| US Pop 100 (Billboard) | 62 |
| US Hot Rap Songs (Billboard) | 12 |

=== Year-end charts ===
| Chart (2005) | Peak position |
|---|---|
| UK Urban (Music Week) "So Seductive" / "Live By The Gun" | 9 |
| US Hot R&B/Hip-Hop Songs (Billboard) | 64 |

== Radio and release history ==
| Country | Date | Format | Label |
|---|---|---|---|
| United States | May 17, 2005 | Digital download | Interscope Records |
| Canada | May 17, 2005 | Digital download | Interscope Records |
| United States | May 24, 2005 | Rhythmic contemporary radio | Interscope Records |
| United States | May 24, 2005 | Urban contemporary radio | Interscope Records |
| United Kingdom | June 1, 2005 | Digital download | Interscope Records |
| Ireland | June 1, 2005 | Digital download | Interscope Records |
| New Zealand | June 1, 2005 | Digital download | Interscope Records |
| United States | June 7, 2005 | Vinyl single | Interscope Records |
| United States | June 7, 2005 | CD single | Polydor Records |
| Australia | September 5, 2005 | Digital download | Interscope Records |
