= Da 1 U Luv 2 Hate =

Da 1 U Love 2 Hate

Studio album by Spider Loc
- Released: June 24, 2008
- Genre: West Coast Hip Hop, Gangsta Rap
- Label: Baymaac/Iceman/Koch

Spider Loc chronology
West Kept Secret: The Prequel (2007)	Da 1 U Love 2 Hate (2008)

Da 1 U Love 2 Hate is an independently released album by G-Unit Records rapper, Spider Loc. It was released via his own label, Baymaac Records. This album has never charted.

== Reception ==
According to ThugLifeArmy.com, Spider Loc "takes you on a journey from the dark and somber times of "Bury Me A G" to the haunting and chilling "Amazin" to "Just Pray" which demonstrates a more spiritual side."

The CEO of Iceman Music Group, distributor for the album, said "Spider has been the West Coast Best Kept Secret for too long now. With this new incredible release the world will see how truly talented this artist really is."

== Track listing ==
1. Intro - 0:21
2. I Just Pray (Feat. Dina Of Girth)- 4:33
3. Bury Me A G - 2:36
4. I'ma Crip (Feat. J Luv And Lil Boss) - 4:58
5. A Day Ago - 3:07
6. Street Life (Feat. Turf Talk, Kartoon And Butch Cassidy) - 3:40
7. 'N Deez Streetz (Feat. 6Tre And Tre') - 3:35
8. Celebrity - 3:33
9. Celebrity (Remix) (Feat. Begetz And Kartoon) - 3:25
10. Major (Feat. E Note) - 3:26
11. Mr. New Bitch (Remix) (Feat. Kartoon And Jessie James) - 3:35
12. Want Me (Feat. Kartoon, Paybacc And Titus) - 3:33
13. Chilax (Feat. Begetz) - 4:21
14. Anywhere (Feat. E Note) - 4:09
15. Homegrown - 5:05
16. Summertime (Feat. E Note) - 4:11
17. 24's (Feat. Bigfoot And Piper) - 2:58
18. Amazin' (Feat. E Note) - 4:01
19. Thought It Was Ova - 4:05
20. Outro - 0:21
21. DVD (Bonus Track)
