= I Know You Don't Love Me =

Single by Tony Yayo featuring G-Unit

from the album Thoughts Of A Predicate Felon
- Released: November 4, 2005
- Recorded: 2005
- Genre: Hip hop; East Coast hip hop
- Length: 3:55
- Label: G-Unit; Interscope; Universal
- Songwriters: Marvin Bernard; Curtis Jackson; Christopher Lloyd; David Brown; B. Holloway; G. Bennett; Eugene McDaniels; Leroy Pendarvis
- Producer: Studio 44

Tony Yayo singles chronology
"Curious" (2005)	"I Know You Don't Love Me" (2005)	"Pass the Patron" (2010)

50 Cent singles chronology
"Hustler's Ambition" (2005)	"I Know You Don't Love Me" (2005)	"Window Shopper" (2005)

"I Know You Don't Love Me" is the third and final single from Tony Yayo's first album, Thoughts of a Predicate Felon. The song features hip hop group G-Unit; 50 Cent sings the chorus while Tony Yayo and Young Buck and Lloyd Banks rap on their own verses.

The song tells the story of how the rappers are engaging in a relationship with the same woman, though she does not know they know, and how they know she does not love any of them because her obvious flirtatiousness and love for other rappers. Several other rappers and performers are mentioned in the song along with examples of what she does that proves she does not truly love any of her men, as evidenced by the chorus:

"I know you don't love me, you ain't the same when Jay-Z's around
I know you don't love me
I know you don't love me, you scream and holla when Eminem's in town."

== Music video ==
The music video is shown in split-screen with each rapper having their own screen. Whoever is rapping gets the larger screen, and the other three are shown concurrently with other women in three smaller screens below. The main woman in the video is almost always with the man who is rapping, except during the first part of Young Buck's rap when the main woman is seen in a fifth screen on her way to see him. In the end, after meeting with all the men individually, the woman is trapped in an elevator with them and embarrassed by all men revealing their knowledge of her promiscuity. Actress Eva Mendes was guest appeared on the music video.

== Charts ==
Chart (2005)	Peak position
US Bubbling Under R&B/Hip-Hop Singles (Billboard)	5
