= Bank Brothers =

- Directed by: Kenneth Guertin
- Written by: Kenneth Guertin
- Starring: Kenneth Guertin; Crooked I Alexa Havins; Spider Loc
- Cinematography: Kenneth Guertin
- Music by: Mikael Jacobson
- Distributed by: Maverick Entertainment Group
- Release date: April 6, 2004
- Running time: 99 minutes
- Country: United States
- Language: English

Bank Brothers is a 2004 comedy film directed and written by Kenneth Guertin

== Cast ==
- Kenneth Guertin as Diamond Man
- Crooked I as Mob Boss
- Alexa Havins as Store Owner
- Spider Loc as Innocent Perpetrator

== Music ==
Spider Loc, as well as music composer Mikael Jacobson, collaborated on the opening credit music.

== See also ==
- List of hood films
