= Haters (Tony Yayo song) =

Single by Tony Yayo featuring 50 Cent, Shawty Lo and Roscoe Dash
- Released: March 23, 2011
- Recorded: 2011
- Genre: Hip-hop
- Length: 3:47
- Label: G-Unit; EMI
- Songwriters: Marvin Bernard; Curtis Jackson; Carlos Walker; Jeffery Johnson; Christopher Gholson
- Producer: Scoop DeVille

Tony Yayo singles chronology
"Pass the Patron" (2010)	"Haters" (2011)	"I Just Wanna" (2012)

50 Cent singles chronology
"No Hands" (2010)	"Haters" (2011)	"Right There" (2011)

Shawty Lo singles chronology
"Bowen Homes Carlos" (2010)	"Haters" (2011)	"Pocahontas" (2011)

Roscoe Dash singles chronology
"No Hands" (2010)	"Haters" (2011)	"Oh My" (2011)

"Haters" is the second single from Tony Yayo's second studio album. The song features fellow rapper 50 Cent, Shawty Lo and Roscoe Dash. The song was released as a digital download on March 23, 2011.

== Background ==
The song was originally released onto 50 Cent's website, Thisis50.com, as well as being premiered by Funkmaster Flex on Hot 97. The song features southern rapper, Shawty Lo who is rumoured to be the newest member of G-Unit Records. The song also sample's Shawty Lo's song, Dey Know. The G-Unit boss 50 Cent referred to the song as, "A hit" on Twitter. The single was released to radio on June 30, 2011. After being released to radio the single started to gain a lot of spins and recognition, the single then charted on the U.S. Billboard Hot R&B/Hip-Hop Songs and this saw Tony Yayo's first song on the chart since 2005.

== Music video ==
Tony Yayo confirmed via his Twitter account that he would be shooting the video for the single in Atlanta on July 29, 2011. The video was shot at Mansion Elan, a club in Atlanta. Rapper Kidd Kidd replaces Roscoe Dash in the video. DJ Drama makes a cameo appearance.

The music video has been viewed over 2.9 million times on YouTube while the audio version has over 470,000 views.

== Charts ==
Chart (2011)	Peak position
U.S. Billboard Hot R&B/Hip-Hop Songs	112

== Release history ==
Country	Date	Format	Label	Ref
United States	April 26, 2011	Digital download	G-Unit Records / EMI	
