= Eat or Die =

Studio album by Bad Religion, NOFX
- Released: 1994
- Recorded: Bad Religion in October 1994 live in Göteborg and NOFX 1993 live in Europe
- Genre: Punk rock

Eat or Die is a 1994 split album by California punk rock bands Bad Religion and NOFX.

== Track listing ==
Bad Religion:

1. "The Handshake"
2. "Too Much To Ask"
3. "Stranger Than Fiction"
4. "American Jesus"
5. "Infected"
6. "Change of Ideas"
7. "Atomic Garden"
8. "The Answer"
9. "Flat Earth Society"
10. "Individual"
11. "Modern Man"
12. "Modern Day Catastrophists"
13. "Sanity"
14. "Leave Mine to Me"
15. "Generator"
16. "Do What You Want"
17. "Yesterday"
18. "Anesthesia"
19. "Lookin' in"
20. "21st Century"

NOFX:

1. "Together On the Sand"
2. "Nowhere"
3. "Stickin' In My Eye"
4. "Bob"
5. "Vanilla Sex/Green Corn*"
6. "Straight Edge"
7. "Lisa and Louise"
8. "Shower Days"
9. "Kill All The White Man"
- Note: The CD track listing erroneously names track 5 of the NOFX tracks as "You Are Bleeding".
