= Curious (Tony Yayo song) =

Single by Tony Yayo featuring Joe

from the album Thoughts of a Predicate Felon
- Released: July 18, 2005
- Recorded: 2005
- Genre: Hip hop, R&B
- Length: 3:23
- Label: G-Unit
- Songwriter: Marvin Bernard
- Producer: Sam Sneed

Tony Yayo singles chronology
"Drama Setter" (2005)	"Curious" (2005)	"I Know You Don't Love Me" (2005)

Joe singles chronology
"Priceless" (2004)	"Curious" (2005)	"Where You At?" (2006)

"Curious" is a song by American rapper Tony Yayo, and the third single off his debut album, Thoughts of a Predicate Felon (2005). It features R&B artist Joe on the chorus of the song.

== Chart performance ==
For the chart issue dated September 10, 2005, "Curious" debuted at number 94 on the US Billboard Hot R&B/Hip-Hop Songs chart: it went on to peak at number 85, spending five weeks on the chart in total. Chart-position wise, "Curious" became the second most successful single from Thoughts of a Predicate Felon, behind only the album's first single, "So Seductive", which reached number seven on the corresponding chart and also peaked at number 48 on the US Billboard Hot 100.

== Music video ==
The video is about how Tony Yayo spots a girl he likes, and is 'curious' to know what it would take for her to be his. At the end, the video cuts into another Tony Yayo song called "Pimpin". The video features G Unit.

== Charts ==
Chart (2005)	Peak position
US Hot R&B/Hip-Hop Songs (Billboard)	85
