= I Just Wanna =

Single by 50 Cent featuring Tony Yayo

from the album The Big 10
- Released: March 26, 2012
- Recorded: 2011
- Genre: East Coast hip-hop
- Length: 4:22 (Main version); 3:28 (Single version)
- Label: Shady; Aftermath; Interscope
- Songwriters: Curtis Jackson; Marvin Bernard; Dorian Norman; Harry Wayne Casey; Richard Finch
- Producer: D.R.U.G.S Beats

50 Cent singles chronology
"Outlaw" (2011)	"I Just Wanna" (2012)	"New Day" (2012)

"I Just Wanna" is a song by American hip-hop recording artist 50 Cent, released on March 26, 2012, as the second single from his tenth mixtape The Big 10, released on December 9, 2011. The song features vocals from 50 Cent's fellow G-Unit member Tony Yayo and was produced by D.R.U.G.S Beats.

== Background ==
The single was announced on February 23, 2012, with the cover. The song on the mixtape starts with a sexual thirty-six-second intro and samples "That's the Way (I Like It)" performed by KC and the Sunshine Band. The intro and the sample was cut from the single version.

== Music video ==
The video for the single was released on December 12, 2011, via his YouTube account and featured cameos appearances from Tony Yayo. 50 Cent also shown his new headphones line of SMS Audio on the video. It was directed by Jackson Smith, who also directed all the videos of the mixtape, except "Niggas Be Schemin'".

The music video has received over 5 million views on YouTube.

== Track listing ==
Digital single
No.	Title	Writer(s)	Producer	Length
1.	"I Just Wanna" (featuring Tony Yayo)	Curtis Jackson; Marvin Bernard; Dorian Norman; Harry Wayne Casey; Richard Finch	D.R.U.G.S. Beats	3:28

== Credits and personnel ==
- Songwriter – Curtis Jackson, Marvin Bernard, Dorian Norman, Harry Wayne Casey, Richard Finch
- Production – D.R.U.G.S Beats

== Charts ==
Chart (2012)	Peak position
US Hot R&B/Hip-Hop Songs (Billboard)	60

== Radio and release history ==
Country	Date	Format	Label	Ref.
Canada	March 26, 2012	Digital download	Shady, Aftermath, Interscope	
United States	March 26, 2012	Digital download	Shady, Aftermath, Interscope	
United States	March 6, 2012	Rhythmic contemporary radio	Shady, Aftermath, Interscope	
United States	March 6, 2012	Urban contemporary radio	Shady, Aftermath, Interscope	
