= Thoughts of a Predicate Felon =

Studio album by Tony Yayo
- Released: August 30, 2005
- Studio: Sound One; Integrated Studios (New York, NY); Sony Music Studios (New York, NY); G Unit Studios (New York, NY); 54 Sound (Detroit, MI); Encore Studios (Los Angeles, CA); Sound On Sound (New York, NY); Right Track Recording (New York, NY); JOI Studios (Atlanta, GA)
- Genre: Hardcore hip hop; gangsta rap
- Length: 1:00:41
- Label: G-Unit; Interscope; Money Management
- Producer: 50 Cent (exec.); Sha Money XL (also co-exec.); Black Jeruz; DJ Khalil; Domingo; Eminem; Focus...; Havoc; J. R. Rotem; LT Moe; Megahertz; Punch; Ron Browz; Sam Sneed; Sebb; Studio 44

Singles from Thoughts of a Predicate Felon
- 1. "So Seductive" Released: June 7, 2005; 2. "Curious" Released: July 18, 2005; 3. "I Know You Don't Love Me" Released: November 4, 2005

Thoughts of a Predicate Felon is the debut studio album by American rapper Tony Yayo. It was originally scheduled to be released on June 28, 2005, then was pushed back to July 12, 2005, but it ended up being released on August 30, 2005, through G-Unit Records and Interscope Records. Recording sessions took place at Sound One, at Integrated Studios, Sony Music Studios, G Unit Studios, Sound on Sound and Right Track Recording in New York, at 54 Sound in Detroit, at Encore Studios in Los Angeles and at Joi Studios in Atlanta. Production was handled by Focus..., Eminem, Black Jeruz, DJ Khalil, Domingo, Havoc, J. R. Rotem, LT Moe, Megahertz, Punch, Ron Browz, Sam Sneed, Sebb, Studio 44, and Sha Money XL, who also served as co-executive producer. It features guest appearances from fellow G-Unit members 50 Cent, who also served as executive producer, Lloyd Banks, Young Buck, Olivia and Spider Loc, as well as Eminem, Obie Trice, Jagged Edge, Joe and Kokane.

The album produced three singles, "So Seductive", "Curious", and "I Know You Don't Love Me", and one promotional single "Drama Setter", as well as three music videos for "So Seductive", "Curious"/"Pimpin'" and "I Know You Don't Love Me" starring G-Unit.

== Background ==
"With 50, he has the notoriety of hit records. I actually wrote 'Seductive' before he wrote 'Candy Shop'. [That's why] you hear him say 'so seductive' [in the 'Candy Shop' intro]. 50, he plays a big part in all our albums. I feel like we can stand on our own cause we're writing all our material," Tony told SOHH.com. "50, he just adds on. I love to hear 50 get on a record. I love the way 50 rides the beat. I did 'Seductive', 50 came on it and I was like, 'I gotta keep him on it' cause it sounds ten times better with him on it."

The album was delayed and highly anticipated, due to Tony Yayo's time in prison.

The songs "So Seductive" and "Live by the Gun" were featured in the 2005 Xbox video game 50 Cent: Bulletproof. Tony Yayo appears in the video game providing his own voice and likeness and is a playable character in arcade mode.

== Critical reception ==
Professional ratings
Review scores
Source	Rating
AllMusic	3/5 stars
Gigwise	4/5 stars
HipHopDX	2.5/5
PopMatters	3/10
RapReviews	7.5/10
Rolling Stone	3/5 stars
Vibe	3.5/5 stars

The album received generally positive reviews from music critics. Some critics noted that the album had stellar production but thought that Tony's vocals and lyrics were not up to par. Writing for Rolling Stone, Christian Hoard said: "With the exception of a few complete duds, Felon is a solid stopgap, although it may also mark the moment when designer bullet holes start to go out of fashion".

== Commercial performance ==
In the United States, the album debuted at number two on both the Billboard 200 and the Top R&B/Hip-Hop Albums charts with 215,000 copies sold in its first week. The album was held from the number 1 spot by Kanye West's Late Registration, released the same week.

== Track listing ==
Thoughts of a Predicate Felon track listing
No.	Title	Writer(s)	Producer(s)	Length
1.	"Intro" (featuring D. Prosper and Dré McKenzie)			1:13
2.	"Homicide"	Gomez Eliseo Zorrilla	Domingo	3:38
3.	"It Is What It Is" (featuring Spider Loc)	Marvin Bernard; Curtis Williams; Sébastien Vuignier; Marshall Mathers; Luis Resto; Steven King	Sebb; Eminem^{[a]}	5:00
4.	"Tattle Teller"	Bernard; Rashad Smith; Michael Clervoix; Daryl Hall; John Oates	Black Jeruz; Sha Money XL	4:16
5.	"So Seductive" (featuring 50 Cent)	Bernard; Curtis Jackson; Michael R. Harper	Mike "Punch" Harper	3:30
6.	"Eastside Westside"	Bernard; Bernard Edwards Jr.; Ray Parker Jr.	Focus...	2:47
7.	"Drama Setter" (featuring Eminem and Obie Trice)	Bernard; Mathers; Obie Trice; Jeffrey Bass; Resto; King	Eminem; Jeff Bass^{[a]}; Luis Resto^{[a]}	5:03
8.	"We Don't Give a Fuck" (featuring 50 Cent, Lloyd Banks and Olivia)	Bernard; Jackson; Charles Lloyd; Jasmin Lopez; Jonathan Rotem	J. R. Rotem	3:41
9.	"Pimpin'"	Bernard; Todd Moore	LT Moe	3:06
10.	"Curious" (featuring Joe)	Bernard; Samuel Anderson	Sam Sneed	3:23
11.	"I'm So High" (featuring Kokane)	Bernard; Jerry Buddy Long Jr.; Jackson; Khalil Abdul-Rahman; Maurício Alberto Kaisermann; Louis Gaste	DJ Khalil	3:24
12.	"Love My Style"	Bernard; Dorsey Wesley; Anand Bakshi; Laxmikant–Pyarelal	Megahertz	4:08
13.	"Project Princess" (featuring Jagged Edge)	Bernard; Brandon Casey; Brian Casey; Edwards Jr.	Focus...	3:49
14.	"G-Shit"	Bernard; Rondell Turner	Ron Browz	3:45
15.	"I Know You Don't Love Me" (featuring G-Unit)	Bernard; Jackson; Lloyd; David Brown; B. Holloway; G. Bennett; Eugene McDaniels; Leroy Pendarvis	Studio 44	3:55
16.	"Dear Suzie"	Bernard; Kejuan Muchita	Havoc	3:07
17.	"Live by the Gun"	Bernard; Edwards Jr.	Focus...	2:57
Total length:				1:00:41

Notes

- ^{^[a]} signifies an additional producer.

Sample credits

- Track 1 contains recreated dialogue from American Me
- Track 2 contains elements from "Los Hombres De Rabia Tambien Lloran" written by Eliseo Zorrilla and performed by Danny Rivera
- Track 4 contains elements from "Sara Smile" written by Hall & Oates and performed by Impact
- Track 6 contains resung elements from "Mr. Telephone Man" by Ray Parker Jr.
- Track 11 contains elements from "Feelings" by Morris Albert
- Track 12 contains elements from "Toxic" by Britney Spears and "Tere Mere Beech Mein" written by Laxmikant Kudalkarand, Pyarelal Sharma and Anand Bakshi and performed by Lata Mangeshkar & S. P. Balasubrahmanyam
- Track 15 contains elements from "Early Ev'ry Morning" written by Eugene McDaniels and Leon Pendarvis and performed by Roberta Flack

== Personnel ==
- Marvin "Tony Yayo" Bernard – main artist
- Derick Prosper – vocals & score (track 1), A&R
- Dré McKenzie – vocals (track 1)
- Curtis "Spider Loc" Williams – vocals (track 3)
- Curtis "50 Cent" Jackson – vocals (tracks: 5, 8, 11, 15, 16), executive producer
- Marshall "Eminem" Mathers – vocals & producer (track 7), additional producer (track 3), mixing (tracks: 3, 7)
- Obie Trice – vocals (track 7)
- Christopher "Lloyd Banks" Lloyd – vocals (tracks: 8, 15)
- Olivia Longott – vocals (track 8)
- Joseph "Joe" Thomas – vocals (track 10)
- Jerry "Kokane" Long, Jr. – vocals (track 11)
- Jagged Edge – vocals (track 13)
- David "Young Buck" Brown – vocals (track 15)
- Hailu – backing vocals (track 17)
- Kenyatta Beasley – score (track 1)
- Carlos "C12" Bess – score & mixing (track 1)
- Eric "E Bass" Johnson – bass (track 2)
- Luis Resto – additional keyboards (tracks: 3, 7), additional producer (track 7)
- Stu "Bassie" Brooks – additional bass (track 5), bass (track 14)
- Steven King – guitar & bass (track 7), mixing (tracks: 3, 7)
- Jeff Bass – keyboards & additional producer (track 7)
- Tony Burgess – guitar & additional producer (track 10)
- Domingo Padilla – producer (track 2)
- Sébastien "Sebb" Vuignier – producer (track 3)
- Robert "Black Jeruz" Smith – producer (track 4)
- Michael "Sha Money XL" Clervoix – producer (track 4), co-executive producer
- Mike "Punch" Harper – producer (track 5)
- Bernard "Focus..." Edwards, Jr. – producer (tracks: 6, 13, 17)
- Jonathan "J.R." Rotem – producer (track 8)
- Todd "LT Moe" Moore – producer & recording (track 9)
- Samuel "Sam Sneed" Anderson – producer (track 10)
- DJ Khalil Abdul-Rahman – producer (track 11)
- Dorsey "Megahertz" Wesley – producer (track 12)
- Rondell "Ron Browz" Turner – producer (track 14)
- Studio 44 – producer (track 15)
- Kejuan "Havoc" Muchita – producer (track 16)
- Steve Simons – recording (track 1)
- Ky Miller – recording (tracks: 2–6, 8, 11–17)
- Mike Strange – recording (track 7), additional recording (track 3)
- Tony Campana – recording (track 7), additional recording (track 3)
- Taurus Scott – recording (track 7)
- Nicholas "Aqua" McCarrell – recording (track 10)
- Pat Viala – recording (tracks: 10, 11), mixing (tracks: 2, 6, 8, 10–13, 15–17)
- Wesley Morris – recording (track 13)
- Steve Baughman – mixing (tracks: 4, 5, 9, 14)
- Mauricio "Veto" Iragorri – mixing (track 4)
- Brian "Big Bass" Gardner – mastering
- Marcus Heisser – A&R
- Jonathan Mannion – photography

== Charts ==
=== Weekly charts ===
Chart (2005)	Peak position
Australian Albums (ARIA)	72
Australian Urban Albums (ARIA)	12
Belgian Albums (Ultratop Flanders)	79
Canadian Albums (Billboard)	3
French Albums (SNEP)	50
German Albums (Offizielle Top 100)	34
Irish Albums (IRMA)	23
New Zealand Albums (RMNZ)	38
Scottish Albums (OCC)	48
Swiss Albums (Schweizer Hitparade)	58
UK Albums (OCC)	41
UK R&B Albums (OCC)	2
US Billboard 200	2
US Top R&B/Hip-Hop Albums (Billboard)	2

=== Year-end charts ===
Chart (2005)	Position
US Billboard 200	152
US Top R&B/Hip-Hop Albums (Billboard)	52
