= 50 Cent: Bulletproof =

2005 video game

- Developer: Genuine Games
- Publisher: Vivendi Universal Games
- Director: David Broadhurst
- Designers: Haydn Dalton; Rob Reininger
- Programmer: Steven J. Batiste
- Artists: Han Randhawa; Gary Brunetti; Yanick Lebel
- Writer: Terry Winter
- Composer: Sha Money XL
- Platforms: PlayStation 2, Xbox, PlayStation Portable
- Release: PS2, Xbox: NA: November 17, 2005; EU: November 25, 2005; PSP: NA: August 29, 2006
- Genre: Action
- Modes: Single-player, multiplayer

50 Cent: Bulletproof is an action third person shooter video game developed by Genuine Games and published by Vivendi Universal Games for the PlayStation 2 and Xbox, which was released on November 17, 2005. The game was reworked into a PlayStation Portable version titled 50 Cent: Bulletproof G Unit Edition, with a top-down perspective, which was released in 2006. A sequel, 50 Cent: Blood on the Sand, was released in 2009.

The story revolves around the titular rapper searching for vengeance against the hitmen who attempted to murder him. The game features members of the G-Unit rap crew as a gang, along with Dr. Dre playing an arms dealer, Eminem playing a corrupt police officer, and DJ Whoo Kid playing himself as a person selling "bootlegged" music (of the G-Unit camp) out of his trunk. A soundtrack album, titled Bulletproof, was released by DJ Red Heat's Shadyville Entertainment. It won "Best Original Song" in the 2005 Spike TV Video Game Awards.

== Gameplay ==
Gameplay is linear and focused on third person shooting, with use of a cover system, while promoting a run and gun play style, all taking place in an open world with individually designed levels or arenas.

The player can run, jump, use movable objects as cover and loot defeated enemies. The game offers a wide variety of weapons to choose from which can be purchased using in-game currency. The player can carry multiple weapons at the same time and freely swap between them while in combat. The player is often accompanied by AI companions during missions, who assist the player by engaging enemies and repeating helpful game hints. These characters are invincible and can effectively clear areas unassisted.

The player must manually adjust the camera to aim at targets. The game offers an aim assist system and the aiming reticle changes color to indicate the precision of the shot. The player can perform executions when prompted, use walls as cover and execute a combat roll for increased mobility. The arenas are populated with waves of enemies all culminating to a boss fight at the end of the level.

The game has a hub, or open world, where the player can freely explore. In this area, the player can spend their game currency to purchase weapons, executions or finisher moves and consumables which replenish the players health or increase their defensive stats.

== Plot ==
50 Cent receives a distress call from his former juvie cellmate and friend K-Dog (Dwayne Adway), and assembles his crew – Lloyd Banks, Young Buck and Tony Yayo – to help him. The crew goes to K-Dog's location in Queens and shoot their way through an armored tactical squad, but 50 Cent narrowly fails to rescue K-Dog and is shot nine times.

50's crew brings him to the apartment of Doc Friday, a former licensed doctor until he started writing prescriptions for himself, to recover for a few weeks. 50 Cent then goes to Detective Aaron McVicar (Eminem), a corrupt cop, to buy information about K-Dog's whereabouts. Though reluctant, McVicar agrees for a favor. He tells 50 that K-Dog was taken in by the FBI, and is being questioned at a safehouse in Scarsdale, New York. He and Lloyd Banks infiltrate the safehouse to find K-Dog and the federal prosecutor already dead, and the same tactical squad from before trying to kill him again. 50 and Lloyd Banks kill them, search the house for evidence, grab K-Dog's phone and belongings and notice a strange new tattoo on K-Dog's arm.

50 Cent brings K-Dog's phone to Bugs, a wheelchair-using pawn shop owner and hacker, and they find a voicemail from biker leader Spider about them meeting. He goes to their base, a junkyard in Brooklyn, and unsuccessfully tries to pose as K-Dog in order to meet Spider. A firefight erupts when he is found out, McVicar arrives to help 50, and 50 kills Spider. 50 recovers some shipping documents and, after noticing Spider had the same tattoo as K-Dog, cuts the skin off Spider's arm to show it to Bugs. Bugs noticed the same tattoo on the arm of Triad leader Wu Jang. 50 goes to confront Wu Jang at his restaurant in Chinatown, Manhattan, and Wu Jang reveals that K-Dog was removed from their syndicate for being 'careless' before a shootout erupts and 50 kills Wu Jang.

When 50 Cent rides the subway back to Queens, the tactical squad storms the train, having traced K-Dog's phone to 50's location. 50 shoots down the assailants and picks up one of their wallets, identifying him as DEA special agent Gabriel Spinoza. In exchange for his help in gathering information about Spinoza as well as his previous help in locating K-Dog, McVicar cashes in the favor 50 owes him, which is to kill fellow corrupt detective Lou Petra to prevent him from testifying against him. 50 goes with Tony Yayo to Harlem, where they kill Petra and his crew.

Booker (Chad L. Coleman), a homeless man that 50 Cent had befriended in recent months, warns him that Spinoza survived their subway encounter and came by his apartment building asking about him. Booker, a Coast Guard veteran, also helps 50 make sense of the shipping documents he took from Spider, which lead to a dockside warehouse. When 50 asks dock worker O'Hare (Sean Donnellan) for next week's shipping schedule, O'Hare - a former associate of Spider - locks him in the warehouse and tries to have him killed by bikers. 50 and Young Buck kill O'Hare and his crew, and leave with the shipping schedule.

Upon returning to Booker for more help, 50 Cent witnesses Booker get shot down in a drive-by. At Booker's funeral, 50 meets Booker's daughter Alexa (Dominique Jennings). Alexa, a news reporter, explains that Booker was actually an undercover CIA agent investigating the same syndicate 50 Cent is. She gives him a note from Booker's possessions that read "Eduardo Vasquez – Spinoza connection". McVicar explains to 50 that Spinoza is probably the person that initially shot him nine times, and discovers that Eduardo Vasquez is a deceased drug mule currently in a Midtown Manhattan morgue. Vasquez's gang arrives to kill 50 and morgue employee Matt. 50 protects Matt while getting the heroin sample and cremating Vasquez. 50 escapes to the sewer system, though he is trailed by the gang there. After killing the gang, 50 escapes back to Queens.

50 Cent takes the heroin sample back to local homeless drug addict Popcorn (Tracey Walter), and after rescuing Popcorn from some syndicate hitmen, Popcorn confirms that the heroin is actually pure Afghani opium. McVicar mentions that a Mafioso was recently let off of an opium possession charge because he was secretly an FBI informant. 50 goes to mob boss Frank Capidilupo's (Nick Jameson) casino/meatpacking plant, and is captured. 50 is rescued from a chainsaw executioner by Grizz (Dr. Dre), his longtime arms dealer, and they kill every mobster on site to find out that the informant was Capidilupo himself.

50 Cent, Bugs and McVicar listen to the tape from Capidilupo's wiretap, and hear him meeting with Spinoza (Nolan North) along with Muqtada Muhammad, a Saudi embassy official with ties to oil money and terrorism. Alexa is kidnapped by Spinoza, and McVicar arrests 50 so he can take credit for busting the syndicate. 50 is thrown in jail, but Booker shows up alive and well to bail him out. 50 takes G-Unit to storm Muqtada's cargo ship. 50 kills Muqtada and most of the syndicate goons, then goes to confront Spinoza and rescue Alexa. McVicar shows up to try to arrest Spinoza, who shoots McVicar in the knee. 50 then kills Spinoza and rescues Alexa. A tactical team led by Booker seizes a container full of missiles from the ship, but Booker allows 50 to get away with another container full of drugs as a reward. 50 and Alexa begin dating. 50 gives a paltry amount of the reward money to McVicar, then leaves the ship.

== Development ==
The game was created by Woodland Hills, California-based developer Genuine Games. Early in development it was conceived as an open-world game in the style of Grand Theft Auto: San Andreas, but strict deadlines meant it was scaled back to a more-linear experience.

=== G Unit Edition ===
On August 29, 2006, Vivendi Universal Games released a G Unit Edition for the PlayStation Portable. While the story and cutscenes are the same as the console counterpart, the game eschews the third-person perspective game-play for a top-down, isometric viewpoint. Also added is multiplayer game-play through ad hoc wireless connectivity.

== Soundtrack ==
Bulletproof

Soundtrack album by 50 Cent
- Released: November 2005
- Recorded: 2005
- Genres: East Coast hip-hop; hardcore hip-hop; gangsta rap
- Length: 43:15
- Labels: G-Unit; Shadyville
- Producers: Sha Money XL; J.Bonkaz

50 Cent chronology
The Massacre (2005)	Bulletproof (2005)	Curtis (2007)

The soundtrack was released in November 2005 and features 13 new songs from 50 Cent. Consumers who pre-ordered the album were also given a previously unreleased DVD of 50 Cent's 2003 European tour called "No Fear, No Mercy".

=== Track listing ===
All tracks produced by Sha Money XL, except "Pimpin, Part 2" produced by J.Bonkaz

No.	Title	Length
1.	"Maybe We Crazy"	3:29
2.	"When You Hear That" (featuring Tony Yayo)	2:51
3.	"I'm a Rider"	2:42
4.	"Simply the Best"	1:42
5.	"Pimpin, Part 2"	3:56
6.	"Not Rich, Still Lyin' (The Game Diss)"	3:51
7.	"Why They Look Like That"	1:40
8.	"Come and Get You"	2:04
9.	"I Warned You"	2:08
10.	"I Run NY" (featuring Tony Yayo)	4:55
11.	"Grew Up"	1:33
12.	"South Side"	1:31
13.	"Why Ask Why"	2:46
14.	"Hit Your Ass Up" (featuring Lloyd Banks and Tony Yayo)	3:19
15.	"G-Unit Radio" (featuring Whoo Kid)	0:43
16.	"Window Shopper (Remix)" (featuring Mase)	4:04
17.	"Movie Trailer"	0:47
18.	"Best Friend (Remix)" (featuring Olivia)	4:10

== Reception ==
Reception

Aggregate scores
Aggregator	Score
GameRankings	47.38% (PS2); 51.75% (Xbox); 53.56% (PSP)
Metacritic	47/100 (PS2); 50/100 (Xbox); 52/100 (PSP)

Review scores
Publication	Score
1Up.com	D+ (PSP)
Computer and Video Games	7/10 (PS2, PSP)
Edge	2/10 (PS2, Xbox)
Electronic Gaming Monthly	3.3/10 (PS2, Xbox); 4.5/10 (PSP)
Eurogamer	4/10 (PS2); 5/10 (PSP)
Game Informer	6/10 (PS2, Xbox); 6.25/10 (PSP)
GamePro	2/5 (PS2)
GameSpot	4.8/10 (PS2, Xbox); 5.1/10 (PSP)
GameSpy	1.5/5 (PS2, Xbox)
GamesRadar+	2.5/5 (PS2, Xbox); 2/5 (PSP)
GameTrailers	5.2/10 (PSP)
GameZone	5/10 (PSP)
IGN	6.5/10 (PS2, Xbox); 5/10 (PSP)
Official U.S. PlayStation Magazine	3/10 (PS2)
Official Xbox Magazine (UK)	4/10 (Xbox)
Official Xbox Magazine (US)	5/10 (Xbox)
PlayStation: The Official Magazine	4/10 (PS2); 5.5/10 (PSP)
PSM3	4.8/10 (PS2) 4.7/10 (PSP)
TeamXbox	6.8/10 (Xbox)
X-Play	1/5 (PS2, Xbox); 2/5 (PSP)
USA Today	3/5 (PS2, Xbox)

50 Cent: Bulletproof received generally below average reviews due to poor gameplay mechanics but was praised for its solid storyline and music. It received 1 out of 5 and a Golden Mullet from X-Play. In spite of this, it received a positive rating of 8/10 from Official UK PlayStation 2 Magazine.

The PlayStation Portable G Unit Edition received mixed reviews from critics. GameSpot's Alex Navarro did, however, say that it was a better game than the PS2 or Xbox versions.

In Australia, the game was banned for encouraging game violence, with the distributor proving unsuccessful in its attempts to appeal the decision. In January 2006, the Australian Classification Board approved of a censored version which removed its arcade mode, downplayed its level of gore and declared itself to be over automatically if any innocent people are killed during the game; this version was rated MA15+.

=== Sales ===
50 Cent: Bulletproof sold 1,123,000 units, according to NPD Group (it is unclear whether this figure includes the PSP's "G-Unit Edition" release). By July 2006, the PlayStation 2 version had sold 600,000 units and earned $27 million in the United States. Next Generation ranked it as the 98th-highest-selling game launched for the PlayStation 2, Xbox or GameCube between January 2000 and July 2006 in that country. Overall sales of Bulletproof reached 850,000 units in the United States by July 2006. Its PlayStation 2 version received a "Gold" sales award from the Entertainment and Leisure Software Publishers Association (ELSPA), indicating sales of at least 200,000 units in the United Kingdom.
