= Eastsidin' =

Single by Glasses Malone featuring Snoop Dogg and Nipsey Hussle

from the album Beach Cruiser
- Released: February 26, 2010
- Genre: West Coast hip-hop; Gangsta rap
- Length: 3:38
- Label: Hoo-Bangin'; Suburban Noize; Cash Money
- Songwriters: Charles Penniman; Calvin Broadus; Airmiess Asghedom; Thomas "RATED TG" Torres, Jr.
- Producer: RATED TG

Glasses Malone singles chronology
"Til da Sun Come Up" (2009)	"Eastsidin'" (2010)	"I Get Doe" (2010)

Snoop Dogg singles chronology
"The Mack" (2011)	"Eastsidin'" (2011)	"I Drink I Smoke" (2011)

Nipsey Hussle singles chronology
"Bitches Ain't Shit" (2011)	"Eastsidin'" (2011)	"Black Faces" (2012)

Music video
- "Eastsidin'" on YouTube

"Eastsidin'" (also known as "Eastsidin' (Crip Gang)") is a song by Glasses Malone featuring Snoop Dogg and Nipsey Hussle, released on February 26, 2010 as the fourth single on his debut studio album Beach Cruiser. The track is a direct gangsta rap representation of West Coast Crip culture (often stylized as "Crippin'"). All three artists heavily draw from their personal histories, utilizing distinct slang, imagery, and references to the traditional blue colors associated with the subculture. Musically, the song is a heavy, rhythmic "banger" tailored to the classic, gritty West Coast hip-hop. Lyrically, the track features distinct, hard-hitting verses from Glasses Malone and Nipsey Hussle, paired with an infectious, signature hook delivered by Snoop Dogg, who repeatedly references checking in with his "nephew from the blue division".

== Musical style ==
The track utilizes the signature rhythmic bounce, heavy basslines, and synth melodies iconic to Southern California hip-hop (West Coast hip-hop). With Snoop Dogg featured on the track, it naturally adopts the smooth, melodic, yet gritty G-funk aesthetic that dominated the 1990s West Coast scene. Structurally and lyrically, the single serves as a "Crip Gang" anthem, delivering raw street narratives and focusing on gang culture from the perspective of Watts and broader Los Angeles.

== Critical reception ==
Hip-hop blogs and publications widely appreciated the track's traditional G-funk leanings. RapRadar highlighted the track as a "blue rag ode" that effectively flipped Snoop Dogg's vocals, advising listeners to "getcha walk on responsibly". In a review of the parent album Beach Cruiser, Rap and Hip-Hop News noted that while the track leaned heavily into well-worn hip-hop cliches of street life and gang affiliations (specifically detailing Malone's younger years with the Crips), Malone proved to be an incredibly qualified and capable storyteller because the lyrics were backed by his genuine life experiences. Critics pointed out the natural chemistry over the beat, identifying the pairing of veteran icon Snoop Dogg with then-rising star Nipsey Hussle as a natural fit for an anthem representing the East Side of Los Angeles. While the sound is undeniably West Coast, the single and its accompanying music video were deliberately styled to bridge the culture, connecting street affiliations and hip-hop aesthetic).
