= Don't Get It Twisted =

Don't Get It Twisted may refer to:

- Don't Get It Twisted, the sixth studio album from American rapper, Mr. Capone-E, and its title track
- "Don't Get It Twisted", a song by Gwen Stefani from her 2006 studio album, The Sweet Escape
