= Amusement Park (disambiguation) =

An amusement park is a group of entertainment attractions, rides, and other events in a location for the enjoyment of large numbers of people.

Amusement Park may also refer to:

- The Amusement Park, a 1975 film by George A. Romero
- Wonder Park, a 2019 film produced under the working title Amusement Park
- "Amusement Park" (50 Cent song), 2007
- "Amusement Park" (Baekhyun song), 2020
- "Amusement Park" (Lay song), 2019
- "Amusement Park" (Penny Crayon), a 1989 television episode

== See also ==
- Theme Park (disambiguation)
