= Straight to the Bank =

Single by 50 Cent

from the album Curtis
- B-side: "Straight to the Bank (Instrumental)"
- Released: June 29, 2007
- Recorded: 2006
- Genre: Hip-hop
- Length: 3:10
- Label: Shady; Aftermath; Interscope; Universal
- Songwriters: Curtis Jackson; Tyrone Fyffe; Andre Young
- Producers: Ty Fyffe; Dr. Dre

50 Cent singles chronology
"Can't Leave 'em Alone" (2007)	"Straight to the Bank" (2007)	"I Get Money" (2007)

"Straight to the Bank" is the second single from 50 Cent's third album, Curtis. The song is produced by Ty Fyffe, with additional production from Dr. Dre. Tony Yayo contributes with a laughing effect in the chorus. This stuttered laughing effect was then later copied by Lupe Fiasco on his song, The Coolest, from Lupe Fiasco's The Cool.

== Background ==
Six days after the song was leaked on the Internet, it debuted at number 48 on the Hot R&B/Hip-Hop Songs and peaked at number 30 weeks later. "Straight to the Bank" debuted at #32 on the Billboard Hot 100 on the week of May 26, 2007. It remained on the chart for 3 weeks, before falling off. 50 Cent performed the song live for the first time at the highly touted WBC Super Welterweight Championship fight between Floyd Mayweather Jr. and Oscar De La Hoya on May 5, 2007, at the MGM Grand in Las Vegas, Nevada, while leading Mayweather's entourage into the ring. At its highest, "Straight to the Bank" hit number 3 on the iTunes single chart; however, due to the Curtis album being delayed, the song was removed from the iTunes library.

== Music video ==
The music video debuted on MTV on May 17, 2007, after the "Amusement Park" video, which was released on May 16, 2007. On December 31, 2007, the music video appeared at number 83 on BET's Notarized: Top 100 Videos of 2007 countdown. The music video features cameos by G-Unit members Spider Loc and Tony Yayo, who contributes uncredited vocals to the song. The song has over 90 million views on YouTube.

== Remixes ==
An official remix was made featuring up and coming G-Unit Records artist Young Hot Rod. The song featured an altered, slower beat. The remix clocked in at 3 minutes and 44 seconds and was introduction to Hot Rod as an artist. A second remix was made featuring 2Pac and Daz Dillinger. Both guest star's verses were taken from previously released songs by both artists. The main remix is the song "I Get Money", which was originally supposed to be a remix to "Straight to the Bank", but due to major publicity the song became a single and song by itself.

== Track listing ==
- 2-Track
1. "Straight to the Bank" - 3:11
2. "Straight to the Bank" (instrumental) - 3:11
- Maxi CD
1. "Straight to the Bank" - 3:11
2. "Straight to the Bank" (instrumental) - 3:11
3. "Straight to the Bank" (a cappella) - 3:11
4. "Straight to the Bank" (CD-rom video)

== Charts ==
Chart (2007)	Peak position
Austria (Ö3 Austria Top 40)	60
Belgium (Ultratip Bubbling Under Flanders)	23
Canada Hot 100 (Billboard)	60
Czech Republic Airplay (ČNS IFPI)	45
Finland (Suomen virallinen lista)	7
France (SNEP)	38
Germany (GfK)	33
Lithuania (EHR)	33
Sweden (Sverigetopplistan)	53
US Billboard Hot 100	32
US Hot R&B/Hip-Hop Songs (Billboard)	30
US Hot Rap Songs (Billboard)	10
US Pop 100 (Billboard)	38
US Rhythmic Airplay (Billboard)	22

== Certifications ==
Region	Certification	Certified units/sales
Brazil (Pro-Música Brasil)	Gold	30,000^{‡}
New Zealand (RMNZ)	Platinum	30,000^{‡}
^{‡} Sales+streaming figures based on certification alone.

== Release history ==
Region	Date	Format(s)	Label(s)	Ref.
United States	April 24, 2007	Rhythmic contemporary radio	Shady, Aftermath, Interscope	
