= Diary of a G =

Studio album by Mr. Capone-E
- Released: August 25, 2009
- Recorded: 2009–2010
- Genre: West Coast hip hop
- Length: 76:32
- Label: Hi-Power
- Producer: Mr. Capone-E

Mr. Capone-E chronology
Dedicated 2 the Oldies 2 (2007)	Diary of a G (2009)	The Lost Chapters (2010)

Singles from Diary of a G
- 1. "Light My Fire" Released: March 25, 2009; 2. "Three of the Best From the West"

Diary of a G is the eleventh studio album from rapper Mr. Capone-E released on August 25, 2009 through his own record label Hi-Power Entertainment. Mr. Capone-E produced Diary of a G with co-producer Fingazz. Diary of a G is a two-disc set with the album plus the DVD; the DVD shows all the steps Mr. Capone-E takes to make the album. The DVD features artists such as Lil Eazy-E, Lil Rob, Snoop Dogg, The Game, Mr. Criminal, Prima J, (Boxer) Amrkhan, and more. The album features artist's such as Snoop Dogg, Mr. Criminal, Fingazz, The Game, Glasses Malone, Birdman, and more. Including the single "Light My Fire" featuring Snoop Dogg & Fingazz.

== Track listing ==
1. Gangster Prayer
2. It Ain't About Me
3. Gang Bangin' Shit
4. Three Of The Best From The West (featuring The Game & Snoop Dogg)
5. Real Riders (featuring Glasses Malone)
6. South Sider's Most Wanted (featuring Mr. Criminal)
7. Lupillo Rivera (Shout Out) [Corrido Skit]
8. Light My Fire (featuring Fingazz, Mr. Criminal, Miss Lady Pinks & Snoop Dogg)
9. Getting It (Remix) (featuring Bigg Steele, Fingazz & Birdman)
10. No Problem (featuring Elite 1 & Lucky Luciano)
11. They Wanna Murder Me
12. Against All Odds
13. Drinkin' Out Da-40 Bottle (Rain Drops)
14. Outlaws Part Two
15. I Wanna Fuck (featuring Carolyn Rodriguez & Miss Lady Pinks)
16. Like This And Like That
17. Stiletos (featuring Fingazz)
18. Ooops Upside Your Head
19. Ain't Lookin Back No More
20. This is My Diary
21. Outro

== Charts ==
Chart (2009)	Peak position
U.S. Top Heatseekers	24
U.S. Top Rap Albums	18
