= I Get Money =

Single by 50 Cent

from the album Curtis
- Released: June 30, 2007
- Genre: East Coast hip-hop; gangsta rap
- Length: 3:43
- Label: Shady; Aftermath; Interscope; Universal
- Songwriters: Curtis Jackson; Kirk Robinson; William Stanberry
- Producer: Apex

50 Cent singles chronology
"Straight To The Bank" (2007)	"I Get Money" (2007)	"Ayo Technology" (2007)

"I Get Money" is the third single from 50 Cent's third album, Curtis. This song was #14 on Rolling Stone's list of the 100 Best Songs of 2007. The song peaked at #20 on the Billboard Hot 100 and was certified Gold by the RIAA.

== Production ==
"I Get Money" contains elements from Audio Two's "Top Billin'". It was recorded at 50 Cent's Connecticut mansion studio by engineer Alonzo Vargas. Although the track was a promotional single, it was also the official remix for 50 Cent's previous single, "Straight to the Bank". The song was produced by Apex. Initially, Scott Boogie was credited as the producer of the song; however, it was later discovered that Scott Boogie actually stole the beat from Apex. In the song, 50 Cent talks about the Glacéau acquisition by The Coca-Cola Company (as he had an ownership stake in Glacéau's parent company); he raps:

I took quarter water, sold it in bottles for two bucks. Coca-Cola came and bought it for billions, what the fuck?

== Critical reception ==
Whilst reviews for Curtis were generally mixed, "I Get Money" received acclaim from most music critics. Several named it as a standout track from the album, many of whom praised the production by Apex. RapReviews.com writer Arthur Gailes described it as an example of "whenever the production is on [on Curtis], [how] it breathes an even greater life into 50", and also praised the lyrics, writing that "50's swagger and wit work together for an instant hit". In an otherwise negative review for Curtis, Stylus Magazine reviewer Jayson Greene described the song as a "club hit" and felt the song to be the best on the album, stating it to be a "single blip of life on an otherwise completely flat line". David Jefferies of AllMusic praised the song in comparison to 50 Cent's past material, stating it to be "a classic "I Run New York" swagger-fest in the G-Unit style", and wrote that it contained one of three "inspired" and "killer verses" on the album. In his review of Curtis, Sputnikmusic writer Dave Donnelly described "I Get Money" as a "surprise" when compared to his feeling of Curtis as "inconsistent", and felt the song to be superior to the song "I Get Money" was recorded as the official remix to, "Straight to the Bank". the. He also praised Apex's production and the use of the "Top Billin" sample, writing that "Not only does Apex’s version outclass the original, but the clever use of outside samples (including Audio Two’s ‘Top Billin’’) lends the track a power and urgency he’s all but lost in the past few years and gives rise to the quickly-dashed prospect that he could actually take his music in a new and exciting direction."

Whilst describing the music on Curtis generally to be "monotonous", Pitchfork writer Ryan Dombal praised "I Get Money", writing that "Curtis nails this sweet-spot only once, on the stadium-status "I Get Money"." He also described the song as "raw and excitable", calling it "an adrenaline rush so pure it manages to revive 50's weary id for three and a half booming minutes". In his review of Curtis for PopMatters, Josh Timmermann wrote highly of the song, calling it "the collection's clear MVP... arguably the hip-hop single of the year and 50's strongest track in years". He also praised the attitude and tone exhibited by 50 Cent on the record, writing "In its irresistible arrogance and amoral brand of gallows humor (both foremost among 50’s virtues), it’s reminiscent of his reputation-making breakthrough, "How to Rob"". He also went on to praise the lyrics, in particular praising the line "I write the check before the baby comes / who the fuck cares? / I’m stanky rich / I’m a die tryin’ to spend this shit". He felt these words represented "50 at his charismatic, self-aggrandizing best" and also wrote "Dominance is his great theme, and, to be sure, one of contemporary rap's. Rarely, among his recent output (and rap's, for that matter), has it been strutted out as convincingly as it is here". Time magazine named "I Get Money" one of "The 10 Best Songs of 2007", ranking it at number six: writer Josh Tyrangiel praised the song as “hypnotic”, observing that its appeal is owed to the sample of "Top Billin", a song he wrote to be "best described as the sound of bad things about to happen". He also commented that "50 Cent’s bemusement - at his own survival, his success in the fact that you could possibly care what he has to say - makes the song as wry as it is scary." In their list of "The 100 Best Songs of 2007", Rolling Stone listed "I Get Money" at number fourteen, writing that "this over-the-top celebration of stanky richness was one of the strongest radio hits of 2007, thanks to its grinding beat, nickel-plated hooks and 50's pile-driving rhymes".

== Music video ==
The music video was released on July 13, 2007.

The video reached number one on BET's 106 & Park on September 7, 2007. In 2007, it was nominated in the BET Hip Hop Awards for Best Hip Hop Video. Two Lamborghini Murcielagos were featured in the video.

The music video on YouTube has received over 95 million views as of April 2024.

== Remakes and sampling ==
Daddy Yankee recorded an official remix in October 2007, the song is a promo of his album El Cartel: The Big Boss a Japanese BT Deluxe of Curtis' album.

On August 3, 2007, HipHopDX.com reported that an official remix which features Diddy and Jay-Z was released.

Diddy stated that there is a remix featuring himself, and Jay-Z . However, on September 12, 2007, 50 Cent confirmed in an interview with Hot 97 that the remix was released and features Diddy and Jay-Z, with the track being known as the "Forbes 1-2-3 Billion Dollar Remix". The track was released on September 17, 2007.

Ludacris has also remixed I Get Money where he is thought to have disrespected fellow Atlanta rapper T.I.

Chamillionaire also created his own version of the song called "Money Already Made" for his Mixtape Messiah 3.

Lil' Flip released a song titled "I Get Money" (ft. Rick Ross) which was featured on his album "I Need Mine" in 2006 followed by a remix ft. Jim Jones more than a full calendar year before 50 Cent's version was released. The two songs have minor similarities, the chorus in Lil' Flip's version is screwed which makes the two different. Regardless, many Flip fans have become disappointed in what they call a rip-off of Flip's song.

Nicki Minaj recorded a freestyle to this track for her mixtape, "Sucka Free".

Rapper Cassidy responded with a "I Get Money (Remix)" dissing all rappers who took his style and instrumentals (such as 50 Cent) while he was incarcerated, on the Larsiny Family 100 Bars mixtape.

UK rapper Kano made a freestyle to this song on his MC No.1 mixtape.

Lil' Kim also made a freestyle called "I Get It" for her mixtape Ms. G.O.A.T. which she takes a few jabs at Bronx rapper Remy Ma

A freestyle or lost verse by Eminem leaked onto the internet in February 2011.

Rapper Papoose made his own remix called I Get Gully on the I Get Money beat.

50 Cent's later single "Baby by Me" (2009) uses prominent samples from "I Get Money".

The Song Appeared In the End Credits of "Next Day Air" (2009)

=== Music video for the remix ===
At the beginning of the music video of 50's "I'll Still Kill", a brief 29 second clip of what seemed to be a preview of the "I Get Money Billion Dollar Remix" was shown, indicating that a music video for the remix has been made and may be released soon. However this may have been for that video. Since then, two fan versions were released on YouTube, and both only contained 50's verse. These both use clips from the "I'll Still Kill" music video, including the intro.

== Track listing ==
#	Title	Time
1	"I Get Money (clean)"	3:50
2	"I Get Money (album)"	3:50
3	"I Get Money (instrumental)"	3:50
4	"I Get Money (acapella)"	3:45

=== Remix ===
#	Title	Time
1	"I Get Money (Billion Dollar Remix) (clean)"	4:32
2	"I Get Money (Billion Dollar Remix) (album)"	4:32
3	"I Get Money (Billion Dollar Remix) (instrumental)"	4:32
4	"I Get Money (American Remix) (Featuring Daddy Yankee)	4:05

== Charts ==
=== Weekly charts ===
Chart (2007)	Peak position
Canada Hot 100 (Billboard)	63
Switzerland (Schweizer Hitparade)	88
US Billboard Hot 100	20
US Hot R&B/Hip-Hop Songs (Billboard)	10
US Hot Rap Songs (Billboard)	4
US Pop 100 (Billboard)	35
US Rhythmic Airplay (Billboard)	22

=== Year-end charts ===
Chart (2007)	Position
US Hot R&B/Hip-Hop Songs (Billboard)	71

== Certifications ==
Region	Certification	Certified units/sales
New Zealand (RMNZ)	Gold	15,000^{‡}
United Kingdom (BPI)	Silver	200,000^{‡}
United States (RIAA)	Platinum	1,000,000^{‡}
^{‡} Sales+streaming figures based on certification alone.

== External link ==
- Music video for "I Get Money" on YouTube
