= Beach Cruiser =

Studio album by Glasses Malone
- Released: August 29, 2011
- Recorded: 2006–11
- Genres: Gangsta rap; West Coast hip hop
- Labels: Hoo-Bangin'; Suburban Noize; Cash Money
- Producers: Ronald "Slim" Williams (exec.); Bryan "Birdman" Williams (exec.); Dwayne "The President" Carter (exec.); Yung Fokus; DJay Cas; RATED TG; DJ Toomp; Tha Bizness; Curt Beatz; Dem Jointz; The Cataracs; Mams Taylor; ENG; 2Much; Bigg D; Meetro; M-16; Swizz Beatz; Jess Jackson; Jerry Duplessis; Arden Altino; Midi Mafia; Mannie Fresh; F.O.C.

Glasses Malone chronology
Beach Cruiser (2011)	Glass House (2012)

Singles from Beach Cruiser
- 1. "Certified" Released: November 6, 2007; 2. "Haterz" Released: August 19, 2008; 3. "Til da Sun Come Up" Released: May 12, 2009; 4. "Eastsidin'" Released: February 26, 2010; 5. "I Get Doe" Released: June 15, 2010

Beach Cruiser is the debut studio album by American rapper Glasses Malone. It was released on August 29, 2011, by Hoo-Bangin' Records, Young Money Entertainment, Cash Money Records and Suburban Noize Records. It was postponed at least four times between its initial announcement and ultimate release.

== Title ==
The album's title is named, after the beach cruiser bicycle. In an interview Glasses Malone said, "It's called Beach Cruiser, everybody loves a Beach Cruiser. People love those bikes in the 'hood. It's classic, also when y'all gonna hear the music on the record it gonna be dope to a point where you just feel like there is some kind of cruise which you just ridin to the beach, so again I called it Beach Cruiser."

== Singles ==
The album's first single, "Certified" featuring Akon, was released on November 6, 2007. The song peaked at number 85 on the US Hot R&B/Hip-Hop Songs and peaked at number 24 on the US Hot Rap Tracks charts.

"Haterz" featuring Birdman and Lil Wayne, was released as the album's second single on August 19, 2008.

"Til da Sun Come Up" featuring T-Pain, Rick Ross and Birdman, was released as the album's third single on May 12, 2009. The song peaked at number 94 on the Hot R&B/Hip-Hop Songs Chart.

"I Get Doe" featuring The Cataracs, was released as the album's fourth single on June 15, 2010.

== Commercial performance ==
According to HipHopDX, the album has sold 3,200 copies during the first week, debuting at number 165 on the US Billboard 200.

== Critical response ==
HipHopDX gave the album a 3 out of 5 rating calling the album " more of a throwback than a new jack, more of a memory than the future, but he bangs." and concluded with "With unpolished rhymes, a gutter flow and street-centered approach, it’ll be interesting to see what he does when label woes don’t interfere with his path."

== Track listing ==
No.	Title	Writer(s)	Producer(s)	Length
1.	"G Bo (Intro)"			0:24
2.	"Kickstand"	Charles Penniman; Brian "Yung Fokus" Reid; Anthony "DJay Cas" Thompson	Yung Fokus; DJay Cas	3:19
3.	"Eastsidin'" (featuring Snoop Dogg and Nipsey Hussle)	Penniman; Calvin Broadus, Jr.; Ermias Asghedom; Thomas "RATED TG" Torres, Jr.	RATED TG	3:38
4.	"Certified" (featuring Akon)	Penniman; Aliaune Thiam; Aldrin Davis	DJ Toomp	4:50
5.	"Dope"	Penniman; Chris "Tha Bizness" Whitacre; Justin "Tha Bizness" Henderson	Tha Bizness	3:33
6.	"Off Safety" (featuring LaToiya Williams and Mack 10)	Penniman; Curtis "Beatz" Bradford; LaToiya Williams; Dedrick Rolison	Curt Beatz	4:09
7.	"Hold On (Rare Breed)" (featuring T. Lopez)	Penniman; Dwayne Abernathy, Jr.; Jonathan "J-Real" Royster; Samuel Watson IV; Christina Lopez	Dem Jointz	3:42
8.	"I Get Doe" (featuring The Cataracs)	Penniman; David Singer-Vine; Niles Hollowell-Dhar	The Cataracs	3:27
9.	"Rich N Thuggin'" (featuring Ya Boy)	Penniman; Mams Taylor; William Crawford	Taylor	3:38
10.	"Car Wash"	Penniman; Brendan "ENG" Kernaghan	ENG	4:28
11.	"Call Me T.I."	Penniman; Reuben "2Much" Proctor II	2Much	3:18
12.	"Til da Sun Come Up" (featuring T-Pain, Rick Ross and Birdman)	Penniman; Faheem Najm; William Robert II; Bryan Williams; Derrick Baker	Bigg D	3:19
13.	"No Sympathy" (featuring Jay Rock)	Penniman; Johnny McKinzie, Jr.; Dimitrius "Meetro" Lynch II	Meetro	4:19
14.	"Club Heaven"	Penniman; Bradford	Curt Beatz	5:37
15.	"Feel Good Muzik" (featuring LaToiya Williams)	Penniman; L. Williams; Joshua "M-16" Banks	M-16	3:48

iTunes bonus tracks
No.	Title	Writer(s)	Producer(s)	Length
16.	"Stronger"	Penniman; Kaseem Dean	Swizz Beatz	3:58
17.	"Just Wait'n"	Penniman; Jess Jackson	Jackson	3:48

F.Y.E. exclusive deluxe edition (bonus tracks)
No.	Title	Writer(s)	Producer(s)	Length
16.	"My Turn" (featuring Kam, LaToiya Williams, Lupe Fiasco and Wyclef Jean)	Penniman; L. Williams; Wasalu Jaco; Nelust Jean; Jerry Duplessis; Arden "Keyz" Altino	Duplessis; Altino	5:07
17.	"I'mma Pray" (featuring Tyrese)	Penniman; Tyrese Gibson; Whitacre; Henderson	Tha Bizness	5:57
18.	"Go Big" (featuring Mack 10)	Penniman; Rollison; Kevin Risto; Waynne Nugent	Midi Mafia	4:08
19.	"Fuc Wit Me" (featuring Mannie Fresh)	Penniman; Byron Thomas	Mannie Fresh	4:41
20.	"Haterz" (featuring Lil Wayne and Birdman)	Penniman; Dwayne Carter, Jr.; B. Williams	F.O.C.	5:10
