= Certified (song) =

Single by Glasses Malone featuring Akon

from the album Beach Cruiser
- Released: November 6, 2007
- Recorded: 2006–2007
- Genre: Gangsta rap; R&B
- Length: 4:50
- Label: Hoo-Bangin'; Cash Money; Universal Motown
- Songwriters: Charles Penniman; Aliaune Thiam; Aldrin Davis
- Producer: DJ Toomp

Glasses Malone singles chronology
"Certified" (2007)	"Haterz" (2008)

Akon singles chronology
"Never Took The Time" (2007)	"Certified" (2007)	"I'll Still Kill" (2008)

"Certified" is a song by American rapper Glasses Malone, released as the first single from his third studio album, Beach Cruiser. The track is produced by DJ Toomp and features Senegalese-American artist Akon.

West coast artists such as Jay Rock, E-40, and Mack 10 make cameos in the music video. The music video premiered on BET's 106 & Park on March 4, 2008.

The remix features Bun B, Kam and Lil Wayne.

Another remix by artists signed to Malone's record label Blu Division featuring Conflict, Quiz, The Bloc Boyz, K-Style, Roc Slanga and Akon.

== Charts ==
Chart (2007–2008)	Peak position
US Hot R&B/Hip-Hop Songs (Billboard)	85
US Hot Rap Songs (Billboard)	24
US Rhythmic Airplay (Billboard)	29

== Release history ==
Region	Date	Format(s)	Label(s)	Ref.
United States	December 11, 2007	Rhythmic contemporary radio	Universal Motown	
