= Theme Park (disambiguation) =

A theme park is a group of entertainment attractions, rides, and other events in a location for the enjoyment of large numbers of people.

Theme Park may also refer to:

- Theme Park (Alvin Curran album)
- Theme Park (BMX Bandits album)
- "Theme Park" (Lung Leg song)
- Theme Park (video game)
- "Theme Park" (The Apprentice)

== See also ==
- Amusement Park (disambiguation)
