= Ayo Technology =

2007 single by 50 Cent featuring Justin Timberlake

Single by 50 Cent featuring Justin Timberlake and Timbaland

from the album Curtis
- B-side: "I Get Money"
- Released: July 24, 2007
- Recorded: May 2007
- Genre: Dirty rap
- Length: 4:08 (album version)
- Label: Shady; Aftermath; Interscope; Universal
- Songwriters: Curtis Jackson; Justin Timberlake; Timothy Mosley; Floyd Hills
- Producers: Timbaland; Danja

50 Cent singles chronology
"I Get Money" (2007)	"Ayo Technology" (2007)	"I'll Still Kill" (2007)

Justin Timberlake singles chronology
"LoveStoned" (2007)	"Ayo Technology" (2007)	"Until the End of Time" (2007)

Audio sample
- file; help

"Ayo Technology" is the fourth single from 50 Cent's third album, Curtis (2007). It was released on July 24, 2007. The song, featuring Justin Timberlake and vocals from Timbaland, who also produced the song along with Danja, has peaked at number five on the Billboard Hot 100. Internationally, the song peaked within the top ten of the charts in many countries, including Australia, Denmark and the United Kingdom. The song has since been covered by Milow, a Belgian singer-songwriter whose version was successful in a number of countries, including Belgium, Spain, Germany, Italy, and the Netherlands. The song was also covered by Greek-Belgian singer Katerine Avgoustakis.

== Background ==
HipHopDX reported that the song was renamed three times. It was first titled "Ayo Pornography" when it first leaked in May 2007, then "Ayo Technology" in June, and then "She Wants It" by July. Finally, the song title was reverted to "Ayo Technology." The song features Justin Timberlake and Timbaland. In 2008, it was nominated for a Grammy for Best Rap Song. As revealed within its lyrics, "Ayo Technology" puts a strong emphasis on hot-blooded sexual fantasies, explicit body movements, and wild festivities at nightclubs.

The song is believed by The Guardian to sample Courtship Dating by Crystal Castles.

== Critical response ==
Rob Sheffield from Rolling Stone gave the song a mixed review: "The I-need-love pop tunes are not getting any better, even with Timbaland and Justin Timberlake in the stripper ditty 'Ayo Technology.'" Pitchfork also gave a mixed review: "The album's only concession to modern pop trends— the Timbaland-produced, Timberlake-hooked "Ayo Technology"—flies off the rails as 50, ripped from his comfort zone, falls behind the gurgling, video-game-blipping beat. Though he tries to force the track into more familiar territory with a cyborg-stripper theme, Justin nabs the spotlight without even trying." David Jeffries from AllMusic highlighted and wrote: "At ease is the Timbaland production "Ayo Technology" featuring Justin Timberlake, an obvious single that's "been there, done that" for all parties involved. This doesn't mean it's bland, just safe." The A.V. Club was also positive: "Ayo Technology" follows the sexed-up template of "Candy Shop" and "Just A Lil Bit" in providing strip clubs with the most perfunctory soundtrack possible."

== Remixes and covers ==
The official remix features hip-hop and R&B artist Casely.

An acoustic cover of "Ayo Technology" performed by Belgian singer Milow was released in a number of European countries, topping the charts in the Netherlands, Belgium, Spain, Sweden and Switzerland, and also charting well in countries such as Germany, where the song was certified Platinum for shipping 300,000 copies, as well as in Romania.

In 2009, Katerine Avgoustakis also made a cover of the song which became her first international single. It was number one for one week in Poland on the country's Official Airplay Chart, ranked by Nielsen SoundScan.

British recording artist Craig David also used the song to remix his own song "Hot Stuff (Let's Dance)".

== Music video ==
The music video was premiered by BET on August 2, 2007, and was filmed in North London. 50 Cent described the music video to MTV. He said:

"You can see this is not my normal uniform, or get-up, when I'm in a music video. But it's time for me to do something a little different, and this is the perfect time for me to actually change my look. You might see this on the red carpet, but not in an actual music video. The biggest challenges for the video are giving off a natural vibe and not seeming contrived at any moment. For you to actually be comfortable when you're actually doing it is a task. At some points you've got a room full of people looking at you at one time, just watching you to see what you're going to do. You've got to relax and just do it."

Timbaland's appearance in the music video uses features from the movie Minority Report such as moving computer interfaces with hands. Justin Timberlake's appearance is similar to that of his role in his music video "SexyBack".

The music video on YouTube has received over 330 million views as of April 2025.

== Chart performance ==
In the United States, "Ayo Technology" became 50 Cent's second highest debut on the Billboard Hot 100, entering at #22. The following week, it rose to #18, before falling to #21. One week after, "Ayo Technology" rose to #19. One week later, during the release of 50 Cent's Curtis and Kanye West's Graduation, the song skyrocketed to a peak of #5, becoming 50 Cent's eighth top-ten single as a lead artist, and eleventh overall. In the United Kingdom, the song debuted at #10 on the UK Singles Chart on downloads alone, becoming his eighth top ten single on the chart. It peaked at number two, becoming 50 Cent's highest-charting single in Britain, beating out "In Da Club", which peaked at number three in March 2003. In New Zealand, the song debuted at number eight on the New Zealand Singles Chart, jumping to number one the following week where it stayed for three consecutive weeks. It stayed on the chart for 22 weeks and was certified Gold, selling over 7,500 copies.

== Track listing ==
- 2-Track
1. "Ayo Technology" – 4:07
2. "I Get Money [Straight to the Bank Pt. 2]" – 4:00
- Maxi CD
1. "Ayo Technology" – 4:07
2. "I Get Money [Straight to the Bank Pt. 2]" – 4:00
3. "Ayo Technology" (instrumental) – 4:07
4. "Ayo Technology" (CD-rom video) – 4:07

== Charts ==
=== Weekly charts ===
Chart (2007–2008)	Peak position
Australia (ARIA)	10
Australian Urban (ARIA)	2
Austria (Ö3 Austria Top 40)	14
Belgium (Ultratop 50 Flanders)	13
Belgium (Ultratop 50 Wallonia)	6
Canada Hot 100 (Billboard)	12
CIS Airplay (TopHit)	9
Czech Republic (Rádio Top 100)	9
Denmark (Tracklisten)	7
Finland (Suomen virallinen lista)	7
France (SNEP)	5
Germany (GfK)	3
Hungary (Dance Top 40)	11
Hungary (Rádiós Top 40)	16
Ireland (IRMA)	3
Latvia (Latvian Airplay Top 50)	5
Lithuania (EHR)	2
Netherlands (Dutch Top 40)	17
Netherlands (Single Top 100)	19
New Zealand (Recorded Music NZ)	1
Norway (VG-lista)	7
Romania (Romanian Top 100)	9
Russia Airplay (TopHit)	6
Scottish Singles Sales (Official Charts)	4
Sweden (Sverigetopplistan)	8
Switzerland (Schweizer Hitparade)	2
UK Singles (Official Charts)	2
UK Airplay (Music Week)	26
UK Hip Hop/R&B (Official Charts)	2
US Billboard Hot 100	5
US Hot R&B/Hip-Hop Songs (Billboard)	41
US Hot Rap Songs (Billboard)	10
US Pop Airplay (Billboard)	11
US Rhythmic Airplay (Billboard)	10

Chart (2009)	Peak position
Spain (Promusicae)	17

Chart (2025)	Peak position
Greece International (IFPI)	69

=== Year-end charts ===
Chart (2007)	Position
Australia (ARIA)	47
Austria (Ö3 Austria Top 40)	72
Belgium (Ultratop Flanders)	82
Belgium (Ultratop Wallonia)	65
CIS (Tophit)	59
France (SNEP)	91
Germany (Official German Charts)	37
Hungary (Dance Top 40)	93
New Zealand (Recorded Music NZ)	29
Russia Airplay (TopHit)	60
Sweden (Sverigetopplistan)	79
Switzerland (Schweizer Hitparade)	27
UK Singles (OCC)	25
UK Urban (Music Week)	2
US Billboard Hot 100	87

Chart (2008)	Position
Brazil (Crowley)	77
CIS (Tophit)	60
Hungary (Rádiós Top 40)	93
Russia Airplay (TopHit)	31

=== Decade-end charts ===
Decade-end chart performance for "Ayo Technology" by 50 Cent
Chart (2000–2009)	Position
CIS Airplay (TopHit)	25
Russia Airplay (TopHit)	21

=== Milow version ===
Chart (2008–2010)	Peak position
Austria (Ö3 Austria Top 40)	2
Belgium (Ultratop 50 Flanders)	1
Belgium (Ultratop 50 Wallonia)	5
Canada Hot 100 (Billboard)	70
Czech Republic (Rádio Top 100)	5
Denmark (Tracklisten)	1
European Hot 100	6
Finland (Suomen virallinen lista)	10
France (SNEP)	8
Germany (GfK)	2
Germany (Airplay Chart)	1
Hungary (Editors' Choice Top 40)	20
Italy (FIMI)	5
Netherlands (Dutch Top 40)	1
Netherlands (Single Top 100)	1
Romania (Romanian Top 100)	47
Spain (Promusicae)	2
Spanish Airplay Chart	3
Sweden (Sverigetopplistan)	1
Switzerland (Schweizer Hitparade)	1

=== Year-end charts ===
Chart (2008)	Position
Netherlands (Dutch Top 40)	81
Netherlands (Single Top 100)	52

Chart (2009)	Position
Austria (Ö3 Austria Top 40)	8
Belgium (Ultratop Flanders)	25
Belgium (Ultratop Wallonia)	18
France (SNEP)	67
Germany (Official German Charts)	3
Italy (FIMI)	36
Netherlands (Dutch Top 40)	5
Netherlands (Single Top 100)	16
Spanish Top 20 Airplay	6
Sweden (Sverigetopplistan)	3
Switzerland (Schweizer Hitparade)	3

=== Decade-end charts ===
Chart (2000–2009)	Position
Germany (Official German Charts)	34

=== Katerine Avgoustakis version ===
Chart (2009-18)	Peak position
Belgium Dance (Ultratop Flanders)	5
CIS Airplay (TopHit)	54
Poland Airplay (ZPAV)	71
Russia Airplay (TopHit)	74

== Certifications ==
=== 50 Cent version ===
Region	Certification	Certified units/sales
Australia (ARIA)	3× Platinum	210,000^{‡}
Brazil (Pro-Música Brasil)	2× Platinum	120,000^{‡}
Denmark (IFPI Danmark)	Gold	7,500^{^}
Germany (BVMI)	Gold	150,000^{‡}
New Zealand (RMNZ)	2× Platinum	60,000^{‡}
United Kingdom (BPI)	Platinum	600,000^{‡}
United States (RIAA)	2× Platinum	2,000,000^{‡}
Streaming
Greece (IFPI Greece)	Gold	1,000,000^{†}
^{*} Sales figures based on certification alone.^{^} Shipments figures based on certification alone.^{‡} Sales+streaming figures based on certification alone.^{†} Streaming-only figures based on certification alone.

=== Milow version ===
Region	Certification	Certified units/sales
Austria (IFPI Austria)	Platinum	30,000^{*}
Belgium (BRMA)	Platinum	
Denmark (IFPI Danmark)	Platinum	15,000^{^}
Germany (BVMI)	Platinum	300,000^{^}
Spain (Promusicae)	Platinum	25,000^{^}
Sweden (GLF)	Platinum	20,000^{^}
^{*} Sales figures based on certification alone.^{^} Shipments figures based on certification alone.

== Release history ==
Country	Date	Format	Label
United States	July 24, 2007	Mainstream radio	Shady; Aftermath; Interscope
United States	July 24, 2007	Rhythm/crossover radio	Shady; Aftermath; Interscope
Germany	August 31, 2007	Maxi single	Universal
Germany	September 3, 2007	Digital download	Universal
United Kingdom	September 17, 2007	CD single	Polydor
United Kingdom	September 17, 2007	Digital download	Polydor

== See also ==
- List of number-one singles from the 2000s (decade) (New Zealand)
- Ultratop 50 number-one hits of 2008
- List of number-one hits in Denmark
- List of Dutch Top 40 number-one singles of 2009
- List of Swedish number-one hits
- List of number-one hits of 2009 (Switzerland)
