= Curtis (50 Cent album) =

Studio album by 50 Cent
- Released: September 11, 2007
- Recorded: August 2006 – June 2007
- Genre: East Coast hip-hop
- Length: 55:45
- Labels: G-Unit; Shady; Aftermath; Violator; Interscope
- Producers: Adam Deitch; Apex; Tha Bizness; Dangerous LLC; Danja; Detroit Red; DJ Khalil; Don Cannon; Dr. Dre; Eminem; Eric Krasno; Havoc; Jake One; K-Lassik Beats; Scott Storch; Timbaland; Ty Fyffe

50 Cent chronology
Bulletproof (2005)	Curtis (2007)	War Angel LP (2009)

Singles from Curtis
- 1. "Amusement Park" Released: May 8, 2007; 2. "Straight To The Bank" Released: June 29, 2007; 3. "I Get Money" Released: June 30, 2007; 4. "Ayo Technology" Released: July 24, 2007; 5. "I'll Still Kill" Released: December 14, 2007

Curtis is the third studio album by American rapper 50 Cent. It was released September 11, 2007, by Shady Records, Aftermath Entertainment, G-Unit Records, Interscope Records, and Violator. The album features production from Dr. Dre, Eminem, and Timbaland, among others. Music writers have noted that 50 Cent divides between "hard" and "soft" songs on the album. The album went through many changes in the lead up to its release and was heavily anticipated after the success of 50 Cent's two prior albums, Get Rich or Die Tryin' (2003) and The Massacre (2005).

Curtis received generally mixed reviews from music critics upon release. The album debuted at #2 on the US Billboard 200 chart, selling 691,000 copies in its first week. This gave 50 Cent his third consecutive top five album in the country. After years of slumping sales, the album's competition with Kanye West's Graduation (2007) and the resulting record-breaking performances both albums displayed was considered to be a "great day for hip hop."

Curtis was supported by the hit singles, "Ayo Technology" which reached the top ten on the Billboard Hot 100, peaking at number five, and "I Get Money" which reached the top 20.

== Background ==
Initially, 50 Cent's 2007 album was planned to be Before I Self Destruct. However, he decided to push back its release date to 2008, and instead to release Curtis in 2007. The album's title was changed twice. For the first time, it was changed from "Curtis" to "Curtis S.S.K.". The second time, the title of the album was changed back from "Curtis S.S.K." to "Curtis". The "S.S.K.", which stood for "SoundScan Killer", was intended to show the pressure 50 Cent felt to succeed. The "S.S.K." also stands for "SouthSide King" and "Shoot, Stab, Kill". 50 Cent stated that the album was inspired by his life before his commercial debut, Get Rich or Die Tryin'. He also stated that he chose the album's title because he was known as "Curtis" before he became famous. In January 2007, DJ Whoo Kid predicted the album to be a double disc LP, with one CD having a "crazy club-bangin' ridiculous" theme and the other having a "hard-core killer sh--," theme. However, this did not materialize.

== Recording ==
50 Cent wrote parts of the album in his grandmother's old house in South Jamaica, Queens. He flew to Florida to work on the track titled "Ayo Technology" with Justin Timberlake, and the song was finished in Houston, Texas. While Get Rich or Die Tryin' and The Massacre featured mostly G-Unit and G-Unit Records artists respectively, Curtis features artists that 50 Cent has never worked with before, such as Akon, Justin Timberlake, Mary J. Blige, Robin Thicke, Timbaland and Nicole Scherzinger from The Pussycat Dolls. When asked about his choice of working with artists outside of his company, 50 Cent stated, "The album, for me, was finding a space where I am content and comfortable with my career, where I can go off and create with other artists and experiment a little bit". 50 Cent wrote a significant amount of the guests' lyrics. In an interview with XXL, he said,

I mean, it just brings memories back to me. I'm in my old space, see old faces, things start feeling the way they used to. Being able to write material from a perspective I couldn't probably write [from] in any other space like that. And I was in one of those funky creative spaces where I couldn't come up with nothing... For me, when I come back here, it's like my feet are on the ground. I don't think nothing is more painful than having known what it feel like to be successful and then having it taken away from you. So on some levels, it's healthy for me to go 'head and come from the financial space that I'm in back to here, as a reminder, so I can actually appreciate what I've got.

== Music and lyrics ==
Stylus Magazine's Jayson Greene writes that "the beats on Curtis sound about as dated and cheap as any Koch record", and that "each no-name producer (Veto and Roomio? Jake One?) provides the comfort food they know he'll lap up". Pitchfork Media's Ryan Dombal also comments that 50 Cent "should be able to work with producers who could conjure his hit-making abilities, but instead the MC mostly sticks with tried-and-failed G-Unit stalwarts and Dre-aping up-and-comers that do him few favors". Dave de Sylvia of Sputnikmusic writes of the production on "Ayo Technology", "Timbaland's shred-guitar-goes-keyboard melody is just mesmerising enough to work".

RapReviews editor Arthur Gailes states that "there is no dip in quality lyrically; 50 is often criticized for not being a good lyricist, but he's exceptionally witty in his writtens", and adds that 50 Cent "manages to cover different themes very well", noting his "seduction" on "Follow My Lead". Greene writes that 50 Cent is trying to "revisit the raw fatalism that defined the best tracks on Get Rich or Die Tryin' ", quoting lyrics from "My Gun Go Off" as an example: "You know tomorrow's just a day away / If you can just keep your heart beatin' and your ass awake".

== Controversy ==
The song "Man Down" contains violent lyrics targeting police officers as well as mentioning the murder of Edward Byrne. Because of this, all police references on the song were censored on both the censored and uncensored versions of the album. During an interview with SF Weekly, 50 Cent identified "Man Down" as his favorite song on Curtis despite its censorship, explaining: "I think companies are sensitive to the nonsense that goes on in the media." On December 18, 2007, the fully uncensored version of the song was leaked onto YouTube by YouTuber Kornél Kiss.

== Critical reception ==
Professional ratings
Aggregate scores
Source	Rating
Metacritic	58/100
Review scores
Source	Rating
AllMusic	3.5/5 stars
The Austin Chronicle	1.5/5 stars
The A.V. Club	C
Entertainment Weekly	B−
MSN Music (Consumer Guide)	B
Pitchfork	4.9/10
Rolling Stone	3.5/5 stars
Slant Magazine	1.5/5 stars
Stylus Magazine	D+
URB	3/5 stars

Curtis received mixed reviews from music critics. At Metacritic, which assigns a normalized rating out of 100 to reviews from mainstream critics, the album received an average score of 58, based on 15 reviews. Stylus Magazine observed that "there isn’t an ounce of life in Curtis". Nathan Rabin of The A.V. Club wrote that 50 Cent "has yet to master the art of making a satisfying album rather than delivering a random assortment of demographic-pandering tracks". AllMusic's David Jeffries wrote that Curtis "is entertaining but only impressive in that 50 can run in place and still be on top". The Boston Globe stated that, "artistically, [Kanye] West is always moving, while 50 is at a standstill". Chicago Tribune critic Greg Kot wrote that "at a time when consumers are expressing their dissatisfaction with music-industry product", Curtis provides "exactly what they say they don't want: More of the same". Chase Hoffberger of The Austin Chronicle found 50 Cent "redundant" and said that the album "tires on second-rate beats, juvenile hooks, and rote lyrics about money and guns." Slant Magazine called 50 Cent "one of the worst lyricists alive", criticizing "Amusement Park"'s lyrics and the execution of his metaphors which he "mumbles without a hint of irony or conviction". Robert Christgau, writing for MSN Music, named it "dud of the month" with a "B" grade and wrote that 50 Cent, "a parvenu mastering pop music for money", has "turned into a made man running on vanity".

In a positive review, USA Today's Steve Jones wrote that its themes of "chip-stacking and sexual prowess [...] aren’t new", but stated that 50 Cent "delivers them with unmatched swagger and flair". Rolling Stone writer Rob Sheffield noted that 50 Cent is "out to prove he's everything he used to claim", and similar to The Massacre, he "divides between hard songs ('Man Down', 'Fire', 'I'll Still Kill') and soft songs ('Follow My Lead')". Sheffield also noted that 50 Cent is for the first time "letting guests sing most of the hooks". Kelefa Sanneh of The New York Times commented that "his mush-mouthed delivery is still charming, and so are his endless provocations". Greg Tate of The Village Voice stated, "Curtis is stuffed with tightly wound 21st-century pop songwriting, full of that invisible craft and flow that renders a thing eminently listenable even if it's gratuitously raunchy, politically reprehensible, and sexually retrograde."

On his mixtape The Big 10 (2011), 50 made references to the mixed reception of Curtis on the opening song "Body On It": "If a n**** say I fell off all I want you to do is ask him when ? What they gonna say ? The Curtis album? Okay so number one's not good enough. I gave you "Ayo Technology" that was number one. "I Get Money", that wasn't hot ? So tell me when I fell off ?"

=== Accolades ===
Time magazine ranked the single "I Get Money" number six on its list of The 10 Best Songs of 2007. Time critic Josh Tyrangiel praised the song as "hypnotic", observing that its appeal is owed to the "Top Billin" sample, and that 50 Cent's bemusement at his own survival and success "makes the song as wry as it is scary". PopMatters editor Josh Timmermann cited "I Get Money" as "the collection's clear MVP, an iron-fisted ode to living large".

Curtis earned 50 Cent a win for the Best-Selling Hip-Hop Artist category at the 2007 World Music Awards. However, Entertainment Weekly placed the album at third place in their list of Worst Albums of 2007.

== Commercial performance ==
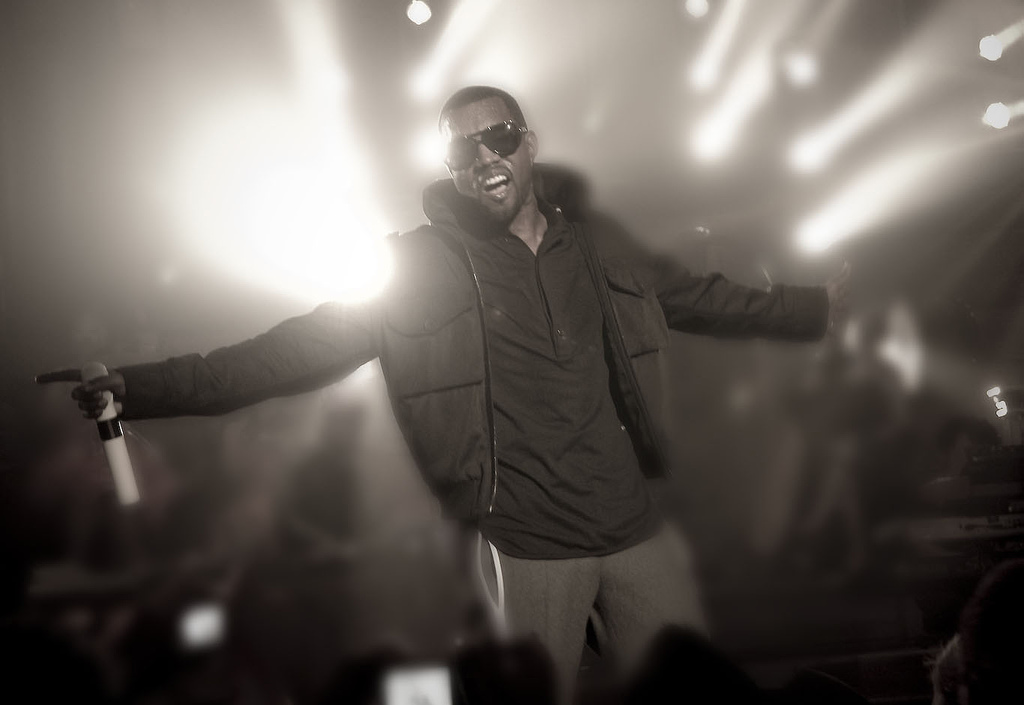
Publicity over the album's release date pitted 50 Cent in a sales competition against American rapper Kanye West (pictured).

Curtis debuted at number two on the US Billboard 200 chart, selling 691,000 copies in its first week. It had the fourth highest sales week for an album in 2007 (topping Linkin Park's Minutes to Midnight which sold 625,000, then outsold by the Eagles' Long Road Out of Eden, which moved 711,000 units and later Alicia Keys' As I Am bringing in 742,000 copies.) It also had the highest sales week for an album by an East Coast-based artist since Jay-Z's Kingdom Come debuted with 680,000 copies sold several months earlier. However, Curtis brought in the third-lowest first-week sales of 50 Cent's career, with Get Rich or Die Tryin' selling 872,000 and The Massacre moving 1.14 million copies.

The album sold 143,000 copies in its second week of release in the US, 71,000 copies in its third week, 50,000 copies in its fourth week, 38,000 copies in its fifth week on the chart, and 30,000 copies sold in its sixth week, It sold 24,000 copies in its seventh week, 20,000 in its eighth week, 17,000 in its ninth week, 17,000 in its 10th week, 21,000 in its 11th week, 15,000 in its 12th week, 17,000 in its 13th week, 19,000 in its 14th week, and 25,000 in its 15th week. In the US, Curtis ultimately sold 1,225,000 in 2007.

In 2007, Curtis was ranked as the 36th most popular album of the year on the Billboard 200.

=== Competition with Graduation ===
In July 2007, Kanye West changed the release date for his third studio album Graduation from September 18, 2007, to the same release date as Curtis, with September 11, 2007. This forced the albums to go head-to-head and compete for higher sales against each other. 50 Cent claimed that if Graduation sold more records than Curtis, he would stop releasing solo albums. However, he later dispelled his comments. When asked again about his threat to retire, 50 Cent stated that, if he were to lose, he will release an album every time a major Def Jam artist releases an album.

Graduation's first-week sales of 957,000 and Curtis's first-week sales of 691,000 served as only the second time since 1991, when Nielsen SoundScan began collecting data, that two albums sold more than 600,000 in a week in the United States; in 1991, Guns N' Roses released Use Your Illusion I and Use Your Illusion II, selling 685,000 and 770,000 copies, respectively. The first-week sales totals of Graduation and Curtis outsold the first-week sales totals of Guns N' Roses' two albums. 50 Cent would argue that although West sold more units domestically in the US, his album sold more units worldwide. In September 2008, Billboard released the one-year sales figures for both albums: Curtis finished with sales of 1,336,000, and Graduation finished with sales of 2,116,000.

== Track listing ==
Curtis track listing
No.	Title	Writer(s)	Producer(s)	Length
1.	"Curtis (Intro)"		50 Cent; Eminem	0:50
2.	"My Gun Go Off"	Curtis Jackson; Adam Deitch; Eric Krasno; Derick Prosper	Adam Deitch; Eric Krasno	3:12
3.	"Man Down"	Jackson; Ben Raleigh; Don Cannon; Jay "Detroit Red" Powell; David Mook	Detroit Red; Don Cannon^{[a]}	2:49
4.	"I'll Still Kill" (featuring Akon)	Jackson; Aliaume Thiam; Khalil Abdul-Rahman; Brian "Kobe" Honeycutt	DJ Khalil	3:43
5.	"I Get Money"	Jackson; William Stanberry; Kirk Robinson	Apex	3:43
6.	"Come & Go" (featuring Dr. Dre)	Jackson; James Harris III; Terry Lewis; Andre Young; Dawaun Parker	Dr. Dre	3:28
7.	"Ayo Technology" (featuring Justin Timberlake and Timbaland)	Jackson; Timothy Mosley; Justin Timberlake; Nate Hills	Timbaland; Danja^{[a]}	4:08
8.	"Follow My Lead" (featuring Robin Thicke)	Jackson; Christopher Whitacre; Justin Henderson	Tha Bizness	3:17
9.	"Movin' on Up"	Jackson; Jacob Dutton; Freddie Perren; Leon Ware; Christine Yarian	Jake One	3:24
10.	"Straight to the Bank"	Jackson; Young; Tyrone Fyffe	Ty Fyffe; Dr. Dre^{[b]}	3:10
11.	"Amusement Park"	Jackson; Teraike "Chris Styles" Crawford; A.R. Hatchett; Hailey Campbell	Dangerous LLC	3:09
12.	"Fully Loaded Clip"	Jackson; Kejuan Muchita	Havoc	3:13
13.	"Peep Show" (featuring Eminem)	Jackson; Young; Marshall Mathers; M. Strange; J. Bass; Tony Campana	Eminem	3:52
14.	"Fire" (featuring Young Buck and Nicole Scherzinger)	Jackson; S. Jordan; Young; Dawaun Parker; Nikki Grier; S. Garrett	Dr. Dre	2:49
15.	"All of Me" (featuring Mary J. Blige)	Jackson; Jacob Dutton	Jake One	3:51
16.	"Curtis 187"	Jackson; Kejuan Muchita	Havoc	3:57
17.	"Touch the Sky" (featuring Tony Yayo)	Jackson; Marvin Bernard; Jason Harrold; Keyon "K-Lassik Beats" Harold	K-Lassik Beats	3:10

United Kingdom bonus track
No.	Title	Producer(s)	Length
18.	"Hustler's Ambition"	B-Money "B$"	3:58

Japanese bonus track
No.	Title	Producer(s)	Length
18.	"Smile (I'm Leaving)"	Klasic (uncredited)	4:29

Notes

- ^{^[a]} signifies a co-producer.
- ^{^[b]} signifies an additional

Sample credits

Information taken from Curtis liner notes:

- "Curtis Intro" contains dialogue from the motion picture "Shooters". Used courtesy of Lions Gate Films, Inc. & Geops Amsterdam, B.V., by arrangement YONAS with PFG Entertainment, Inc. Dialogue excerpts spoken by Andrew Howard and Matthew Rhys.
- "Man Down" contains elements from "Scooby Doo Theme" (Mook/Raleigh). Mook Bros Music (admin by Warner-Tamerlane Publishing Corp) (BMI)/Ben Raleigh Music (admin by Music Sales Corp) (ASCAP). Used By Permission. All Rights Reserved.
- "I Get Money" contains elements from "Top Billin" (Robinson) Songs of Universal, Inc./First Priority Music (BMI)/Hot Buttermilk Music, Inc. (admin ICG Alliance) (ASCAP). Used By Permission. All Rights Reserved. Performed by Audio Two. Produced under license from Atlantic Recording Corp, by arrangement with Rhino Entertainment Company, A Warner Music Group company.
- "Come & Go" contains replayed elements from "Just Be Good to Me" (Jam/Lewis). EMI-April Music, Inc./Flyte Tyme Tunes, Inc./Avante Guarde Music Publishing, Inc. (admin by Universal Music Corp) (ASCAP). Used By Permission. All Rights Reserved.
- "Movin On Up" contains elements from "Give Me Just Another Day" (Ware). Used By Permission. All Rights Reserved. Almo Music Corp. Performed by The Miracles. Used by courtesy of Motown Records, Co, LLP. By arrangement with Universal Music Enterprises. "Do It Baby" (Perren/Yarian). Jobete Music Co, Inc. (ASCAP). Used By Permission. All Rights Reserved. Performed by The Miracles. Used courtesy of Motown Records, Co, LLC. By arrangement with Universal Music Enterprises; "Nuttin But A Drumbeat". Performed by Russell Simmons. Used courtesy of Island/Def Jam Records. By arrangement with Universal Music Enterprises.

== Personnel ==
- Producers – 50 Cent (exec.), Adam Deitch, Apex, Tha Bizness, Dangerous LLC, Danja, Detroit Red, Don Cannon, Dr. Dre, Eminem, Eric Krasno, Havoc, Jake One, DJ Khalil, Timbaland, Ty Fyffe
- Audio mixing – Steve Baughman (tracks 2–3, 5, 8–9, 12, 15–17), Demario "Demo" Castelleon (7), Dr. Dre (10–11, 14), Eminem (13), Marcella "Ms. Lago" Araica (4), Mike Strange (13)
- Assistant audio mixing engineer – Seamus "Shameless" Tyson (2–3, 7–9, 12, 15–17), Robert "Roomio" Reyes (6, 11, 14), Doug Sadler (4)
- Keyboard – Adam Deitch (track 2), Dawaun Parker (6, 14), Jay "Detroit Red" Powell (3), Jeff Bass (13), Mark Batson (6, 14), Mike Strange (13), Tony Campana (13)
- Guitar / bass – Eric Krasno (track 2)
- Drum machine – Adam Deitch (track 2), Eric Krasno (2)
- Multiple instruments – Taj "Mahal" Brown (track 10)
- Recording engineers – Tony Yayo (tracks 1–4, 8–9, 11–12, 15, 17), Mauricio "Veto" Iragorri (6, 11, 14), Robert "Roomio" Reyes (6, 14), Eric Krasno (2), Jay "Detroit Red" Powell (3), Alonzo Vargas (5), Demacio "Demo" Castelleon (7), Frankie "Whispers" Zago (10), Mike Strange (13), Tony Campana (13), Phillip "Philly Blunt" Shpiller (16)
- Assistant recording engineers – Jacob Gabriel (track 6), Charles "Red" Garcia (14)
- Additional music recording – Steve Baughman (track 5), Ted Clayton (5), Gary Hadfield (7), Ian Stewart (7)
- Additional audio mixing – Mauricio "Veto" Iragorri (track 8)

== Charts ==
=== Weekly charts ===
Weekly chart performance for Curtis
Chart (2007)	Peak position
Australian Albums (ARIA)	1
Australian Urban Albums (ARIA)	1
Austrian Albums (Ö3 Austria)	4
Belgian Albums (Ultratop Flanders)	3
Belgian Albums (Ultratop Wallonia)	5
Canadian Albums (Billboard)	2
Danish Albums (Hitlisten)	9
Dutch Albums (Album Top 100)	3
European Albums (Billboard)	1
Finnish Albums (Suomen virallinen lista)	19
French Albums (SNEP)	3
German Albums (Offizielle Top 100)	2
Greek Albums (IFPI)	2
Hungarian Albums (MAHASZ)	5
Irish Albums (IRMA)	1
Italian Albums (FIMI)	9
New Zealand Albums (RMNZ)	1
Norwegian Albums (VG-lista)	4
Portuguese Albums (AFP)	14
Scottish Albums (Official Charts)	3
Spanish Albums (Promusicae)	44
Swedish Albums (Sverigetopplistan)	10
Swiss Albums (Schweizer Hitparade)	1
UK Albums (Official Charts)	2
UK R&B Albums (Official Charts)	2
US Billboard 200	2
US Top R&B/Hip-Hop Albums (Billboard)	2

=== Year-end charts ===
2007 year-end chart performance for Curtis
Chart (2007)	Position
Australian Albums (ARIA)	73
Belgian Albums (Ultratop Wallonia)	62
European Albums (Billboard)	31
French Albums (SNEP)	63
Swiss Albums (Schweizer Hitparade)	40
UK Albums (OCC)	84
US Billboard 200	36
US Top R&B/Hip-Hop Albums (Billboard)	11
Worldwide Albums (IFPI)	25

2008 year-end chart performance for Curtis
Chart (2008)	Position
US Billboard 200	193
US Top R&B/Hip-Hop Albums (Billboard)	68

== Certifications ==
Certifications and sales for Curtis
Region	Certification	Certified units/sales
Australia (ARIA)	Platinum	70,000^{‡}
Austria (IFPI Austria)	Gold	10,000^{*}
Belgium (BRMA)	Gold	15,000^{*}
Denmark (IFPI Danmark)	Platinum	20,000^{‡}
France (SNEP)	Gold	75,000^{*}
Germany (BVMI)	Gold	100,000^{^}
Hungary (MAHASZ)	Gold	3,000^{^}
Ireland (IRMA)	Platinum	15,000^{^}
New Zealand (RMNZ)	Platinum	15,000^{‡}
Poland (ZPAV)	Gold	10,000^{*}
Russia (NFPF)	3× Platinum	60,000^{*}
United Kingdom (BPI)	Platinum	300,000^{‡}
United States (RIAA)	Gold	1,336,000
^{*} Sales figures based on certification alone.^{^} Shipments figures based on certification alone.^{‡} Sales+streaming figures based on certification alone.

== See also ==
- List of number-one albums of 2007 (Australia)
