= The Lost Chapters =

Studio album by Mr. Capone-E
- Released: October 27, 2009
- Recorded: 2008–09
- Genre: G-Funk, West Coast hip hop
- Label: Hi Power Entertainment
- Producer: Serious Sam, Makavelik, Mr. Capone-E

Mr. Capone-E chronology
Diary of a G (2009)	The Lost Chapters (2009)	The Blue Album (2010)

The Lost Chapters is the twelfth studio album released by West Coast rapper Mr. Capone-E on October 27, 2009. The album contains songs that did not make the album Diary of a G.

== Track listing ==
#	Title	Guest artist(s)	Time
1	"Intro"		1:31
2	"California"		3:59
3	"Player Hater"		4:09
4	"Just A Con (Original)"		3:34
5	"Hot Summer Nights"		2:59
6	"Welcome To My Hood"	Scrappy Loco	3:48
7	"This Is For The Real"	Lil' Maniac	4:06
8	"Wack Rappers"	Malow Mac	4:22
9	"The Uprising"		6:43
10	"Something to Ride To"	Mr. Criminal	3:57
11	"Southside Roll Call"	Hi Power Soldiers	4:43
12	"My One and Only"	Malow Mac & Miss Lady Pinks	4:09
13	"She's Just My Kind"		3:39
14	"Laker's Anthem '2009'"		3:02
15	"Amir Kahn Entrance"		3:27
16	"Outro"		1:30
