= Street Life =

Street life or Streetlife may refer to:

== Music ==
=== Performers ===
- Street Life (rapper), American rapper

=== Albums ===
- Street Life (The Crusaders album), 1979
- Street Life (Fiend album), 1999
- Streetlife (Geeza album), 1977
- Streetlife (Sqeezer album)
- Street Life (Patrick Street album), a studio album by Patrick Street, 2002
- Street Life: 20 Great Hits, a compilation album of Roxy Music and Bryan Ferry songs, 1986

=== Songs ===
- "Street Life" (Roxy Music song), 1973
- "Street Life" (The Crusaders song), with Randy Crawford, 1979
- "Street Life", a song by Beenie Man
- "Street Life", a song by Kelly Rowland from Talk a Good Game
- "Streetlife", a song by Suede from A New Morning

== Other uses ==
- Streetlife (charity), a charity for young homeless people in Blackpool, England
- Streetlife (website), a UK social networking website launched in 2011
- Streetlife: The Untold History of Europe's Twentieth Century, 2011 book by Leif Jerram
- Streetlife, a 1995 television film written aired on Screen Two
