= Mr. Capone-E =

American rapper

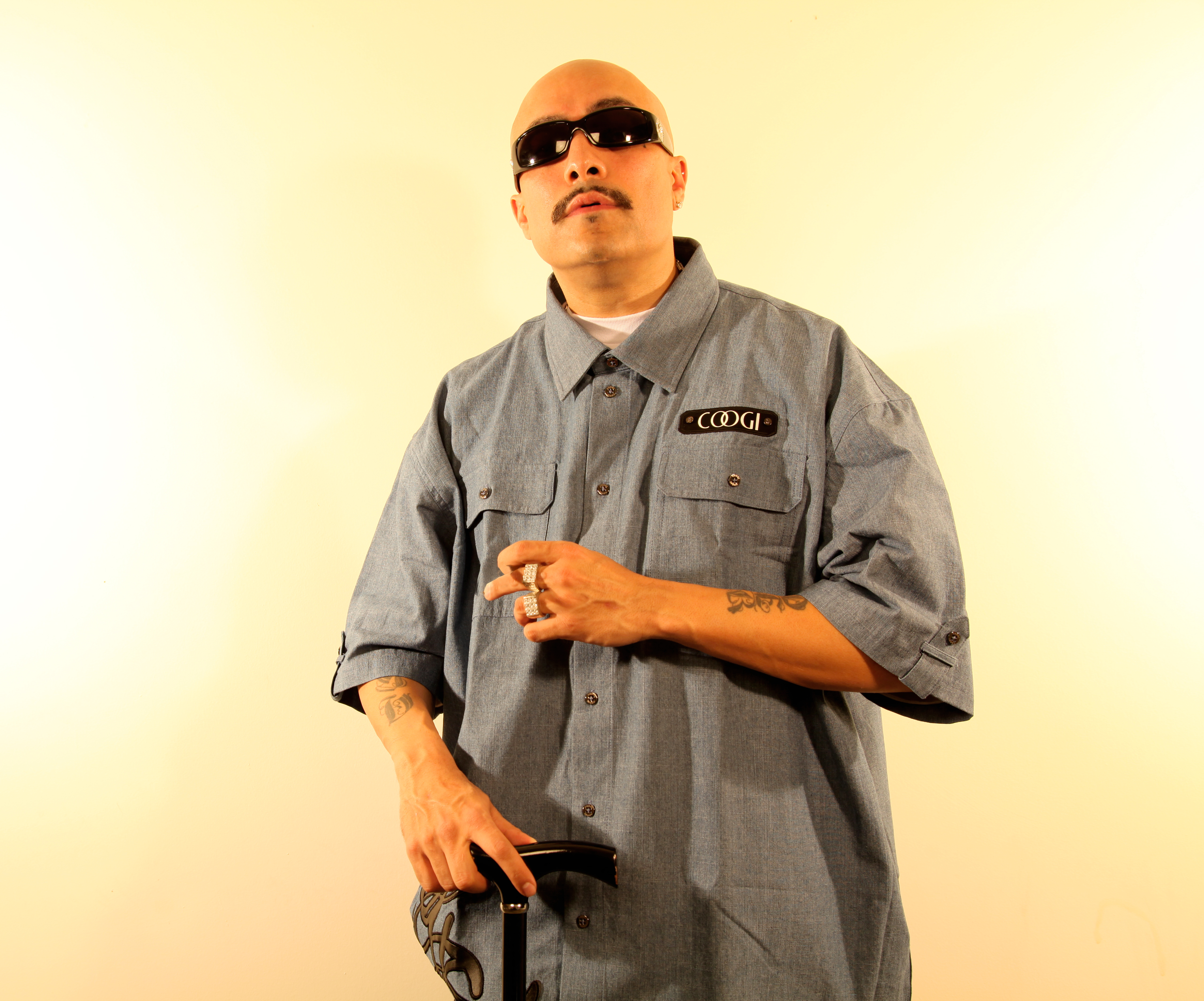
- Mr. Capone-E in 2010

Background information
- Born: Fahd Azam; April 27, 1976 (age 49); Peshawar, Pakistan
- Origin: West Covina, California, U.S.
- Genres: Hip hop, Gangsta rap, Chicano rap
- Occupations: Rapper, singer, songwriter, entrepreneur
- Years active: 1996–present
- Labels: Hi-Power Entertainment, Thump, SMC, PMC, Koch
- Website: Facebook; Instagram; Twitter

Fahd Azam (born April 27, 1976), known professionally as Mr. Capone-E, is an American rapper. He is the owner of the record label Hi-Power Entertainment.

== Early life ==
Fahd Azam was born in the Peshawar district of the Khyber Pakhtunkhwa province of Pakistan to an ethnic Hazara family. He and his family moved to West Covina, California at an early age. He grew up around gangs and became a Sureño. He was incarcerated at 18, and while serving time he decided he wanted to pursue a career in hip-hop.

== Career ==
=== 2000–2005: Career beginnings ===
Mr. Capone-E released his first solo album in 2000 titled Mr. Capone E & The Southsiders independently through his label Hi Power. This album received a lot of buzz and caught the attention of Thump Records. He signed a three-year distribution deal and released his next album Last Man Standing in 2001. In 2003 Mr Capone E released his third album Dedicated To The Oldies which he claims sold over one million records through swap meets and discotecas.

He went on to release Always and Forever in 2003, which featured the single "I Like It" with Nate Dogg. The album also featured guest appearances from Kokane, Mr. Criminal and other artists from his label Hi Power.

In 2005 he released the albums A Soldier's Story and Ol Skool Music Vol.1 and Vol. 2 with Zapp.

=== 2006–2013 Leave from Thump Records, independent releases ===
Money issues began to surface between Mr. Capone-E and Thump, which ultimately led to unpaid royalties to Mr. Capone-E. He was encouraged to leave Thump based on the number of albums he was selling per release. He left and received all the rights to his music released under Thump.

That year Mr. Capone-E released his seventh album, distributed under SMC, Don't get it Twisted, including the hit single "Don't Get it Twisted" ft. Twista, which peaked at #18 on the Top Heatseekers Album Chart, #25 on the Independent Albums Chart and #68 on the Billboard R&B/Rap Albums.

In 2007, Mr. Capone-E signed an independent direct distribution deal with Koch, and released his eighth album, Mr. Capone-E: Dedicated to the Oldies Part II. It peaked at #17 on the Top Heatseekers Albums Chart and #66 on the Billboard R&B/ Hip Hop Album.

In 2009, Capone-E released his ninth album, Diary of a G, including the single "Light my Fire" ft. Snoop Dogg and collaborations with The Game and Glasses Malone, which peaked at #18 on the Billboard Rap Album Charts and #24 on the Top Heatseekers Album Charts. That year he also did a ring entrance song for the WBA Light Welterweight boxing champion at the time, Amir Khan.

He continued to release albums independently over the years, releasing the albums The Blue Album, Tears of a Soldier.

=== 2014–2016: Attempts to crack the mainstream, No Regrets, and For Respect ===
In 2014, Mr. Capone E started working on two albums, No Regrets and For Respect. These albums have more of a mainstream sound to his previous albums, collaborating with artists such as Migos, French Montana, Ray J, and DJ Mustard. To support the albums he released the mixtape Los Angeles Times. The albums were released in 2016.

=== 2017: 12 albums in 12 months ===
In 2017, he released an album every month. He did this because he felt that he was not active musically over the past few years and needed to release a lot of music to become more relevant.

=== 2018–present: Narco Valley, autobiography, and other ventures ===
After releasing those 12 albums, Mr. Capone-E chose to focus more on building his label Hi Power and sign more up and coming talent.

On March 13, 2018, he made his film debut in Narco Valley.

He is also currently working on releasing his autobiography Who Am I detailing his childhood, his family and ethnicity, and his life and career.

=== Hi Power Entertainment ===
Mr. Capone-E founded Hi Power Records in 2000 with the release of his debut album. The independent label launched the career of fellow Chicano rap super star Mr. Criminal.

The label originally was only made up of Chicano rappers in his area, but as the label gained more popularity he signed artists like Bizzy Bone and Layzie Bone of Bone Thugs-n-Harmony, Lil Flip, MC Eiht, Bad Azz, and Suga Free, among others.

== Discography ==
Year	Title	Peak chart positions	
Year	Title	U.S. R&B	U.S. Heat
2000	Mr. Capone-E & the Southsiders: Released: October 24, 2000; Label: Hi-Power Entertainment (2020); Format: CD	—	—
2001	Last Man Standing: Released: October 9, 2001; Label: Thump (579060); Format: CD, download	—	—
2003	Dedicated 2 the Oldies: Released: March 18, 2003; Label: Thump (579099); Format: CD	—	—
2004	Always and Forever: Released: September 28, 2004; Label: Thump (900012); Format: CD, download	—	—
2005	Strictly For The Streets Vol. 1: Released: April 19, 2005; Label: Too Gangster Records; Format: CD, download	—	—
2005	Live In Japan Soundtrack: Released: May 31, 2005; Label: Eastside Records; Format: CD, download	—	—
2005	Zapp & Mr. Capone-E Ol' Skool Music Vol. 1 / Mr. Capone-E & Zapp Vol. 2: Released: November 8, 2005 / January 31, 2006; Label: Hi-Power (900012); Format: CD, download	—	—
2006	A Soldier's Story: Released: April 18, 2006; Label: Thump (579214); Format: CD, download	—	30
2006	Don't Get It Twisted: Released: August 29, 2006; Label: SMC (150); Format: CD, download	68	18
2006	Connected (Lil Flip & Mr. Capone-E album) (with Lil' Flip): Released: November 14, 2006; Label: Hi-Power (2058); Format: CD, download	-	—
2007	Dedicated 2 the Oldies 2: Released: September 11, 2007; Label: Hi-Power (2051); Format: CD, download	66	17
2007	Still Connected (with Lil' Flip): Released: November 6, 2007; Label: Hi-Power (2058); Format: CD, download	68	—
2008	Hi-Power Collectibles Presents: Mr. Capone-E Love Jams: Released: April 29, 2008; Label: Hi-Power (2073); Format: CD, download	—	—
2008	Dedicated 2 The Fans (CD/DVD): Released: September 30, 2008; Label: Hi-Power; Format: CD, download	—	—
2008	Still Connected Part 3 (Lil Flip & Mr. Capone-E album) (with Lil' Flip): Released: October 28, 2008; Label: Hi-Power; Format: CD, download	—	—
2009	Diary of a G: Released: August 25, 2009; Label: Hi-Power (2110); Format: CD, download	—	—
2009	The Lost Chapters: Released: October 27, 2009; Label: Hi-Power Ent.; Format: CD, download	—	—
2010	The Blue Album: Released: June 15, 2010; Label: PMC (72149); Format: CD, download	88	—
2010	Hi-Power Collectibles Presents: Mr. Capone-E Gang Stories: Released: November 9, 2010; Label: PMC (72163); Format: CD, download	—	—
2011	South Side's Most Wanted (with Mr. criminal): Released: March 8, 2011; Label: Hi Power Ent. (72173); Format: CD, download	—	—
2011	South Side's Most Wanted Createst Collaborations (with Mr. Criminal): Released: May 3, 2011; Label: Hi Power Ent. (72173); Format: CD, download	—	—
2011	Tears of a Soldier: Released: July 12, 2011; Label: Hi Power Ent. (2181); Format: CD, download	—	—
2012	Love Jams 2: Released: June 5, 2012; Label: Hi Power Ent.; Format: CD, download	—	—
2012	South Side's Most Wanted: The Return (with Mr. Criminal): Released: September 11, 2012; Label: Hi Power Ent. (72173); Format: CD, download	—	—
2013	Oldies for Life: Released: September 24, 2013; Label: Hi Power Ent.; Format: CD, download	—	—
2016	For Respect: Released: May 13, 2016; Label: Hi Power Ent.; Format: CD, download	—	—
2016	No Regrets: Released: May 13, 2016; Label: Hi Power Ent.; Format: CD, download	—	—
2017	Jackin' Your Beats: Released: January 27, 2017; Label: Hi Power Ent.; Format: CD, download	—	—
2017	Gangster Love: Released: February 27, 2017; Label: Hi Power Ent.; Format: CD, download	—	—
2017	A Hi Power Smoke Out: Released: April 28, 2017; Label: Hi Power Ent.; Format: CD, download	—	—
2017	My Gang Related: Released: May 19, 2017; Label: Hi Power Ent.; Format: CD, download	—	—
2017	California Love: All Eyes On Me: Released: June 16, 2017; Label: Hi Power Ent.; Format: CD, download	—	—
2017	Just a Player: Released: July 21, 2017; Label: Hi Power Ent.; Format: CD, download	—	—
2017	A Hi Power Story: Released: August 25, 2017; Label: Hi Power Ent.; Format: CD, download	—	—
2017	On Memory Lane: Released: October 13, 2017; Label: Hi Power Ent.; Format: CD, download	—	—
2017	New World Order (Killuminati): Released: November 24, 2017; Label: Hi Power Ent.; Format: CD, download	—	—
2017	Forever Oldies: Released: December 25, 2017; Label: Hi Power Ent.; Format: CD, download	—	—

=== Mixtapes ===
- Los Angeles Times (2014)
- After the Smoke Clears (2016)

=== Singles ===
Year	Title	Peak chart positions		Album
Year	Title	U.S. Rhyth	U.S. Latin Rhyth	Album
2004	"I Like It" (featuring Nate Dogg)	40	39	Always and Forever
2006	"Don't Get It Twisted" (featuring Twista)	40	39	Don't Get It Twisted
2007	"You Should Be a Model"	—	32	
2007	"Summertime Anthem" (featuring Fingazz)	—	29	Dedicated 2 the Oldies 2
2007	"Mami Mira" (Mr. Criminal featuring Nate Dogg and Mr. Capone-E)	—	26	Ryder Muzic
2009	"Light My Fire" (featuring Snoop Dogg)	—	35	Diary of a G
2025	"Break It Down"	40	—	Non-album single

=== Guest appearances ===
List of non-single guest appearances, with other performing artists, showing year released and album name
Title	Year	Other artist(s)	Album
"Gangster Groove"	2003	Mr Criminal, Frank V	Criminal Mentality
"You Know How We Do"	2003	Mr Criminal	Criminal Mentality
"This Games a Trip"	2003	Mallow Mac, Mr Criminal	Mallow Mac
"Got Beef With HPG"	2003	Mr Silent, Mr Criminal	Silent Night
"From The Streets To The Mainline"	2004	Mr Criminal	Organized Crime
"We Run With It"	2004	Mr Criminal, Mr Silent	Organized Crime
"Revenge"	2005	Big Lokote, Stomper	Dia De Los Muertos
"Party Tonight"	2005	Mr Criminal, Dominator	Sounds Of Crime
"Thugs Revenge"	2006	Bizzy Bone, Mr Criminal	Thugs Revenge
"All My Life"	2006	Bizzy Bone, Mr Criminal	Thugs Revenge
"For The Homies"	2006	Bizzy Bone, Mr Silent, K.O.	Thugs Revenge
"Say Lady"	2006	Layzie Bone	The New Revolution
"These Hi Power Soldiers"	2006	Layzie Bone	The New Revolution
"Skies The Limit"	2007	Mr Silent	The Alley Boy
"Who Wanna Ride"	2007	Lil Menace	I'm Still Here
"That's The Devil"	2007	Krayzie Bone, Mr Criminal	Thug Unification
"Mama Mira"	2007	Mr Criminal, Nate Dogg	Ryder Muzik
"Aint Nothing Better Then Summer"	2007	Mr Criminal	Ryder Muzik
"West Coast Weekend"	2008	Snoopy, Freda	Straight From The Street
"At The Park"	2008	Snoopy, Freda	Straight From The Street
"Old Lady (West Coast Remix)"	2008	Lil Flip	Lil Flip Presents Lieutenant: Second In Charge
"You Know Me"	2008	Stomper, Mr Criminal, Celly Cel	The New West Coast
"Runnin The Game"	2008	Mr Blazer	Homicide Park
"Summer Time Again"	2008	Mr Criminal	Rise To Power
"Hi Power 4 Life"	2008	Mr Criminal, Mr Silent	Rise To Power
"We Aint Hard To Find"	2008	Layzie Bone, Mr Criminal	Thugz Nation
"I'm Missing You"	2009	Mr Youngster, Tiffany	Firm Oldies Vol. 2
"Party All Night"	2009	Mallow Mac, Samantha Latino	Hypnotized
"The Arrival"	2009	Mr Criminal	Hood Affiliated Part 2
"Gangsta Shit"	2009	Suga Free	Hi Power Pimpin
"In California"	2009	Suga Free	Hi Power Pimpin
"Hi Power Pimpin"	2009	Suga Free, Pimpin Young, Young Lefty	Hi Power Pimpin
"No Sera"	2009	Suga Free, Mailo	Hi Power Pimpin
"Shooting At Me"	2009	Bizzy Bone	Back with the Thugz
"Empty Out My Clip"	2009	Bizzy Bone	Back with the Thugz Part 2
"Dealing With A Thug"	2009	Bizzy Bone	Back with the Thugz Part 2
"Sur Gangster Vatos"	2010	Ese Menace	Exposing The Studio Gangsters
"No One Can Love You"	2011	Miss Lady Pinks	Straight From The Heart
"Front Line Roll Call"	2011	Miss Lady Pinks, Ese Menace	Straight From The Heart
"Party"	2011	Deen Janjua	N/A
"Ride at Night"	2012	Mr Criminal, G-Malone	Young Brown and Dangerous
"Bomb First"	2013	Mr Criminal, C-Boy	Last Of A Dying Breed
"G Funk Is Dead"	2014	Khavel X, Sr Ortega	N/A
"Not Enough Time"	2015	West Vallejo Tunes	N/A
"Get That Paper"	2015	Lazy Dubb	Get That Paper
"West Coast Shit"	2015	Lazy Dubb, Pranx	Get That Paper
"Banged Up"	2015	Mr Criminal	Evolution Of A G
"Most Wanted"	2016	Jazzy B, Snoop Dogg	N/A
"Faded (Yola)"	2016	Los Twins, Mr Criminal	N/A
"My Clique"	2018	D.R.G.	Let Em Know
"You'll Never Change"	2018	Boxer Loco	N/A
"They Want To Lock Me Away"	2019	Qom Qazamah, Flowhammed	Zabardust
"Bloodlust"	2022	Sidhu Moose Wala	No Name
