= Streetlife: The Untold History of Europe's Twentieth Century =

2011 book by Leif Jerram

- Author: Leif Jerram
- Language: English
- Subject: History of urban Europe
- Set in: Europe
- Published: Oxford
- Publisher: Oxford University Press
- Publication date: 2011
- Publication place: United Kingdom
- Media type: Print (hardback, paperback)
- Pages: 477
- ISBN: 9780192807076
- Dewey Decimal: 940.097320904

Streetlife: The Untold History of Europe's Twentieth Century is a 2011 book by the British academic Leif Jerram.

== Synopsis ==
Jerram investigates the transformation of Europe from the street level "from riot and revolution to sporting culture and sexual adventure".

== Reception ==
In The Independent Christopher Hirst characterized the work as "lively" and in The Financial Times the book was praised as an "enjoyably idiosyncratic and provocative journey". A lengthy review was also published in The Times Literary Supplement where the book was described as an "unromanticised, sweeping and informed cultural history of European cities in the long twentieth century". Diederick Klein Kranenburg in the journal International Review of Social History praised it as "both an important historical study and a real page turner".
