= Glasses Malone =

American rapper (born 1978)

- Born: Charles Phillip Ivory Penniman; December 10, 1978 (age 47)
- Origin: Los Angeles, California, U.S.
- Genre: Hip-hop
- Occupations: Rapper; songwriter
- Years active: 2003–present
- Labels: Division Media; Cash Money; Suburban Noize; Hoo-Bangin'
- Website: glassesmalone.com

Charles Phillip Ivory Penniman (born December 10, 1978), known professionally Glasses Malone, is an American rapper from Los Angeles, California.

== Early life ==
Charles Penniman grew up in the Watts and Compton neighborhoods in Greater Los Angeles. He was a Crip gang member as a teenager.

== Music career ==
Traditionally associated with The Black Wall Street Records despite the fact that most of their artists were affiliated with the Bloods, Malone signed with the record label, but later signed with Cash Money Records in 2011, turning down offers from many labels like Def Jam Records, Interscope Records, J Records and Atlantic Records. Glasses Malone was found by the same record executive who found The Game. Along with his signing, he was also given his own imprint, Blu Division. Malone debuted with mixtapes The Crack Mixtape (2003) and White Lightnin... Sticks (2005). White Lightnin... Sticks sold 50,000 copies and included the popular street single "Two Hunned".

Glasses Malone appeared in the music video for Tha Dogg Pound's single "Cali Iz Active" and also made a cameo appearance in the Tech N9ne video for "Like Yeah". He also appeared on the soundtrack to Madden 2007 with a song called "Right Now" which was produced by Scott Storch. On August 4, 2006 Glasses Malone appeared on MTV's You Hear It First.

Malone's first album, Beach Cruiser, was originally scheduled to come out on February 20, 2007. However, Malone changed record labels, signing a new deal with Cash Money Records and Hoo-Bangin' Records. The album's release was tentatively scheduled for April 2008. Two singles from the album debuted in 2008: "Certified" featuring Akon, and "Haterz" featuring Birdman and Lil Wayne. His album was instead released on August 29, 2011, although it was leaked on the internet on August 24. In his album, Malone dedicated a song to American rapper T.I., "Call Me T.I."

In late 2009, Malone accompanied Tech N9ne and hip-hop supergroup Slaughterhouse on the K.O.D. Tour. Malone was featured on former Cash Money R&B singer TQ's 7th studio album Kind of Blue in 2010. Glasses Malone is also found on a specific version of Twiztid's 2012 album Abominationz. Glasses Malone's song "#Rihanna" compared the 2009 assault of Rihanna by Chris Brown to "beating up the pussy", which Rebecca Haithcoat of LA Weekly wrote "crosses the line".

In 2014, Glasses Malone launched his own label, Division Movie Company. Glasses has also signed on with DJ Skee and Dash Radio to develop radio content for his own station.

On January 1, 2017 Glasses Malone was invited to participate in the Juggalo March On Washington. He accepted on January 2, 2017.

== Discography ==
=== Studio albums ===
- Beach Cruiser (2011)
- Cancel Deeez Nutz (2023)

=== Collaborative albums ===
- Money Music (with Mack 10) (2011)

=== Mixtapes ===
- The Crack Mixtape (with The Faxtion) (2003)
- White Lightnin' (Sticks) (2005)
- The Electric Chair (Mixed by DJ Skee & Dow Jones) (2007)
- Fuck Glasses Malone (2008)
- The West Will Rise Again (with Bigg Steele, Mixed by DJ Noize) (2009)
- 2010 - The Chonic (with Greg Street) (2009)
- Nightmare On Seven Street (2009)
- Drive-By Muzik (2010)
- The Dope Mixtape (Mixed by DJ Whoo Kid) (2011)
- We On (with Blu Division and DJ Hed) (2011)
- Monster’s InK. (2011)
- Glass House (Presented by DJ Hed) (2012)
- GlassHouse 2: Life Ain't Nuthin' But (2015)
- Apalachin with J-Haze (2016)
- Glass House (Enhanced reissue of the 2012 version) (2023)
- Fucc Glasses Malone (Enhanced reissue of the 2008 version) (2024)

=== Singles ===
Year	Title	Chart positions		Album
Year	Title	U.S. R&B	U.S. Rap	Album
2007	"Certified" (featuring Akon)	85	24	Beach Cruiser
2008	"Haterz" (featuring Lil Wayne & Birdman)	—	—	Beach Cruiser
2009	"Sun Come Up" (featuring Birdman, Rick Ross & T-Pain)	94	—	Beach Cruiser
2010	"I Get Doe" (featuring The Cataracs)	—	—	Beach Cruiser
2012	"#Rihanna"	—	—	Glass House
2012	"That Good" (featuring Ty Dolla Sign & C Ballin)	—	—	GlassHouse 2: Life Ain't Nuthin but...
2013	"Get Busy" (featuring Tyga)	—	—	GlassHouse 2: Life Ain't Nuthin but...
2015	"Thuggin" (featuring Kendrick Lamar and Killer Mike)	—	—	GlassHouse 2: Life Ain't Nuthin but...

=== Guest appearances ===
Title	Year	Artist(s)	Album
"Blaze It Up"	2007	Tha Dogg Pound (feat. Glasses Malone, Jayo Felony, B.G. Knocc Out and Dresta)	Dogg Chit
"West Side"	2008	Yukmouth (feat. C-Bo and Glasses Malone)	Million Dollar Mouthpiece
"Hogg Anthem"	2008	Glasses Malone, Jay Rock and Big Wy	Draped Up and Chipped Out, Vol. 3
"Up All Nite"	2009	Yukmouth (feat. Matt Blaque, The Jacka and Glasses Malone)	The West Coast Don
"Real Riders"	2009	Mr. Capone-E (feat. Glasses Malone)	Diary of a G
"Big Balla"	2009	Mack 10 (feat. Birdman and Glasses Malone)	Soft White
"Hoo-Bangin' II"	2009	Mack 10 (feat. Glasses Malone)	Soft White
"Street Shit"	2009	Mack 10 (feat. Glasses Malone)	Soft White
"Real P.I."	2009	Swollen Members (feat. Tre Nyce and Glasses Malone)	Armed to the Teeth
"The Fastlane"	2010	TQ (feat. Glasses Malone)	Kind of Blue
"Keep It One Hunit"	2010	Tech N9ne (feat. Big Scoob, Glasses Malone and Irv Da Phenom)	The Gates Mixed Plate
"They DNT Want It"	2011	Big Scoob (feat. Glasses Malone and Boogie Man)	Damn Fool
"Sux 2 B U"	2012	Twiztid (feat. Krizz Kaliko and Glasses Malone)	Abominationz
"Say That Then"	2013	Problem (feat. Glasses Malone)	Understand Me
"Chopper"	2015	Lupe Fiasco (feat. Billy Blue, Buk of Psychodrama, Trouble, Trae tha Truth, Fam-Lay and Glasses Malone)	Tetsuo & Youth
"Suicidal"	2015	Stevie Stone (feat. Glasses Malone and King Harris)	Malta Bend
"Track Two's"	2015	Termanology (feat. Glasses Malone)	Term Brady
"The Kingdom"	2019	TQ (feat. Glasses Malone)	Revolution
