= I'll Still Kill =

Single by 50 Cent featuring Akon

from the album Curtis
- B-side: "Curtis 187"
- Released: December 14, 2007
- Recorded: 2007
- Genre: Gangsta rap
- Length: 3:43
- Label: Shady; Aftermath; Interscope; Universal
- Songwriters: Curtis Jackson; Aliaune Thiam; Khalil Abdul-Rahman; Brooks Honeycutt
- Producer: DJ Khalil

50 Cent singles chronology
| "Ayo Technology" (2007) | "I'll Still Kill" (2007) | "Get Up" (2008) |

Akon singles chronology
| "Certified" (2007) | "I'll Still Kill" (2007) | "Wanna Be Startin' Somethin' 2008" (2008) |

"I'll Still Kill", edited for radio as "Still Will", is a song by American hip-hop recording artist 50 Cent, released as the fifth single from his third album Curtis (2007). The song, which was produced by DJ Khalil, features guest vocals from Senegalese-American singer Akon. The single officially hit airwaves on November 6, 2007. The song peaked at number 95 on the US Billboard Hot 100 chart.

== Background ==
The song was originally produced for rapper Bishop Lamont, who titled the song, "Down". Lamont's version contained chorus vocals by Kobe. The song was dropped (but later leaked), and the beat was given to 50 Cent, who substituted Akon's rewritten hook for Kobe's vocals in the song.

Both 50 Cent and Akon spoke highly of the collaboration, in which 50 Cent exclaimed,

This collaboration, it's perfect. Akon's tones, vocally what he did on the chorus and the last portion of the record, it's great.

Akon shared more of the same thoughts,

Shortly after the song was completed, we met face to face, gave each other a pound, gave each other a hug, like, 'Nigga, we got a hit.' Now we're gonna do more records for both our upcoming albums. We'll swap out. Whoever's album it feel right on, that's where we gonna put it.

50 Cent has since been seen working with Akon in his studio for his upcoming 5th studio album "The Return Of The Heartless Monster". Though the single was expected to be a hit, it only peaked at #95 on The Billboard Hot 100 and #52 on Hot R&B/Hip-Hop Songs, perhaps due to it being released months after the album had already released, as well as the music video being banned from BET and MTV. Snippets of Akon's vocals are sampled by DJ Premier in "Ain't Nuttin Changed" for Blaq Poet.

== Music video ==
The music video was directed by Jessy Terrero, who commented on the video shoot. He said:

It's pretty hectic, but I have a great relationship with both guys. This is big — it's like 'Bourne Supremacy' meets 'Unleashed.' I threw out an idea and 50 enjoyed it.

The video is based around 50 Cent who has to "handle himself in a world of trained killers". In an interview with MTV, Akon commented on the video and said:

It's not an environment for pretty women. This is on some assassination-type action.

The video premiered via BET on November 12, 2007. According to 50 Cent on his Shade 45 Interview on December 9, 2007, it was banned on the network. He criticized BET for showing American Gangster and The Wire, but not his video. In the music video, the song is edited more than the original, with Akon saying "I still will kill" is changed to "I still will chill", and some of the more violent words being replaced with different words. The song and video has over 70 million views on YouTube.

== Track listing ==
- 2-Track
1. "Still Will" (clean version)
2. "Curtis 187"
- Maxi CD
1. "Still Will" (clean version)
2. "I'll Still Kill" (explicit version)
3. "Curtis 187"
4. "Still Will" (CD-rom video)

== Chart positions ==
| Chart (2007–2008) | Peak position |
|---|---|
| Australia (ARIA) | 99 |
| CIS Airplay (TopHit) | 128 |
| French Singles Chart | 28 |
| New Zealand Singles Chart | 14 |
| US Billboard Hot 100 | 95 |
| US Hot R&B/Hip-Hop Songs (Billboard) | 52 |
| US Hot Rap Tracks (Billboard) | 22 |
| US Pop 100 (Billboard) | 79 |

== Certifications ==
| Region | Certification | Certified units/sales |
|---|---|---|
| Brazil (Pro-Música Brasil) | Gold | 30,000^{‡} |
| New Zealand (RMNZ) | Gold | 15,000^{‡} |
^{‡} Sales+streaming figures based on certification alone.
