= Sun Come Up (song) =

Single by Glasses Malone featuring Rick Ross, T-Pain and Birdman

from the album Beach Cruiser
- Released: May 12, 2009
- Recorded: 2009
- Genre: Hip-hop; R&B
- Length: 3:20
- Label: Hoo-Bangin'; Young Money; Cash Money; Universal Motown
- Songwriters: Charles Penniman; Faheem Najm; William Roberts; Bryan Williams; Derrick Baker
- Producer: Bigg D

Glasses Malone singles chronology
"Haterz" (2008)	"Sun Come Up" (2009)	"I Get Doe" (2010)

T-Pain singles chronology
"Download" (2009)	"Sun Come Up" (2009)	"Overtime" (2009)

Rick Ross singles chronology
"What It Is" (2009)	"Sun Come Up" (2009)	"Champion" (2009)

Birdman singles chronology
"Always Strapped" (2009)	"Sun Come Up" (2009)	"Written on Her" (2009)

Music video
- "Sun Come Up" on YouTube

"Sun Come Up" is a song by American rapper Glasses Malone, released as the third single from his third studio album, Beach Cruiser. The track is produced by Bigg D and features Birdman, T-Pain, and Rick Ross. It is a hip hop song that samples Freddie Jackson's "Have You Ever Loved Somebody". On Beach Cruiser, the song is listed under the title "Til da Sun Come Up".

== Music video ==
A music video was shot and released on June 5, 2009. The video was filmed on Miami Beach and was directed by Josh Logue.

== Charts ==
Chart (2009)	Peak Position
U.S. Billboard Hot R&B/Hip-Hop Songs	94
