= Dedicated 2 the Oldies 2 =

Studio album by Mr. Capone-E
- Released: September 25, 2007
- Recorded: 2006–2007
- Genre: Gangsta rap
- Label: Hi-Power Entertainment
- Producer: Mr. Capone-E, Fingazz

Mr. Capone-E chronology
A Soldier's Story (2006)	Dedicated 2 the Oldies 2 (2007)	Still Connected (2008)

Dedicated 2 the Oldies 2 is the tenth double disc studio album from rapper Mr. Capone-E released in 2007. The album features WC (rapper), Fingazz, Joe Bataan and the rest of the Hi Power Soldiers.

== Track listing ==
=== Disc 1 ===
1. Dedicated Intro 2:10
2. West, West, West (featuring WC/Stomper) 3:31
3. Summertime Anthem (featuring Fingazz) 4:39
4. Game 4:16
5. Trippen 3:01
6. Pimp (Skit) 1:24
7. Never Seen a Pimp Like Me 3:33
8. Wet Dreams 3:09
9. In the House (featuring Mr. Criminal/Elite 1) 4:02
10. Spreading Worldwide (featuring Mr. Criminal/Stomper/Mr. Silent) 4:33
11. Answering Machine (Skit) 2:43
12. Still on the Come Up (featuring Hi Power Soldiers) 4:34
13. Mr. Clean 4:55
14. Let Me Luv You Girl 4:31
15. Gun on My Lap 3:24
16. Last Call 3:59
17. Dedicated Outro 2:03

=== Disc 2 ===
1. Oldies Intro 2:14
2. I Had a Choice 4:31
3. Ordinary Guy (featuring Joe Bataan) 4:55
4. Show & Tell 4:18
5. Reminiscing (Skit) 1:15
6. Things Ain't the Same 3:23
7. Somebody Please 3:44
8. Confessing a Feeling 3:57
9. Tell It Like It Is 4:33
10. Oldies Are Forever 2:29
11. My Cloud (featuring Joe Bataan) 4:01
12. Didn't I Blow Your Mind (featuring Roll Ellison) 3:34
13. Do Yourself a Favor (Snapper Diss) 4:33
14. She's a Classic 4:51
15. Bonus Oldie Track 0:10
16. Playgirl 4:38
17. Oldies Outro 2:05

== Trivia ==
The song entitled "Do Yourself a Favor" is a diss towards ex Hi-Power artist "Snapper".

== Charts ==
Chart (2007)	Peak position
US Top Heatseekers	17
US Top R&B/Hip-Hop Albums	66

== Singles ==
- "Summertime Anthem" - peaking at number 29 on the Billboard Latin Rhythm Airplay chart.
- "Mr. Clean"
- "Playgirl"
- "Last Call"
