= Amusement Park (50 Cent song) =

Single by 50 Cent

from the album Curtis
- B-side: "Fully Loaded Clip"
- Released: May 8, 2007
- Recorded: October 2006
- Genre: Hip-hop, dirty rap
- Length: 3:09
- Label: Shady; Aftermath; Interscope; Universal
- Songwriters: Curtis Jackson; Teraike Crawford; A. R. Hatchett; Hailey Campbell
- Producer: Dangerous LLC

50 Cent singles chronology
"Jimmy Crack Corn" (2007)	"Amusement Park" (2007)	"Can't Leave 'em Alone" (2007)

"Amusement Park" is the first single by American rapper 50 Cent from his third album Curtis, which was released in 2007. The music video premiered on Yahoo!'s website on May 16, 2007. The track is a smooth song that uses different amusement park rides as metaphors for sex.

== Background ==
"Amusement Park" was rumored to have been sold to Jim Jones as "Your Majesty" on a DJ Drama mixtape, which has been denied by Dangerous LLC who claims it was probably leaked. Later the verse of Jim Jones in the song was combined with 50 Cent's verses to make it the remix of "Amusement Park."

== Music video and performances ==
The music video premiered on Access Granted on May 16, 2007. The music video on YouTube has received over 20 million views as of April 2024. Shelly Rio makes a cameo appearance.

50 Cent performed the song at the 2007 BET Awards alongside Tony Yayo.

== Remixes ==
A remix was made featuring Jim Jones of Dipset. Because the song was originally Jim Jones' song on a DJ Drama mixtape, his verse was combined with 50 Cent's to make this remix.

== Charts ==
Chart (2007)	Peak position
US Bubbling Under Hot 100 (Billboard)	21
US Hot R&B/Hip-Hop Songs (Billboard)	36
US Hot Rap Songs (Billboard)	17

== Track listing ==
#	Title	Time
1	"Amusement Park (edited version)"	3:08
2	"Amusement Park (album version)"	3:08
3	"Amusement Park (instrumental version)"	3:08
4	"Amusement Park (a cappella version)"	2:42
5	"Fully Loaded Clip (edited version)"	3:14
6	"Fully Loaded Clip (album version)"	3:14
7	"Fully Loaded Clip (instrumental version)"	3:14
8	"Fully Loaded Clip (a cappella version)"	2:50
