= Three 6 Mafia discography =

- Studio albums: 9
- Extended plays: 1
- Singles: 17
- Mixtapes: 4

This is the discography of American hip hop group Three 6 Mafia. The collective has also released music under the name "Triple Six Mafia". The collective contains two subgroups that have released music independently as "Tear Da Club Up Thugs" and "Da Mafia 6ix". The group has also released music through collaboration projects with other artists under the names "Prophet Posse", "Hypnotize Camp Posse" and "Da Headbussaz".

== Albums ==
=== Studio albums ===
List of studio albums, with selected chart positions and certifications
| Title | Album details | Peak chart positions | | | Certifications |
| Title | Album details | US | US R&B | US Rap | Certifications |
|---|---|---|---|---|---|
| Mystic Stylez | Released: May 30, 1995; Label: Prophet; Formats: CD, LP, cassette, digital download | — | 59 | — | |
| Chapter 1: The End | Released: December 3, 1996; Label: Prophet; Formats: CD, LP, cassette, digital download | 126 | 42 | — | |
| Chapter 2: World Domination | Released: November 4, 1997; Label: Hypnotize Minds, Relativity; Formats: CD, LP, cassette, digital download | 40 | 18 | — | RIAA: Gold |
| When the Smoke Clears: Sixty 6, Sixty 1 | Released: June 13, 2000; Label: Hypnotize Minds, Loud; Formats: CD, LP, cassette, digital download | 6 | 2 | — | RIAA: Platinum |
| Choices: The Album | Released: August 28, 2001; Label: Hypnotize Minds, Loud; Formats: CD, LP, cassette, digital download | 19 | 4 | — | |
| Da Unbreakables | Released: June 24, 2003; Label: Hypnotize Minds, Columbia; Formats: CD, LP, cassette, digital download | 4 | 2 | — | RIAA: Gold |
| Choices II: The Setup | Released: March 29, 2005; Label: Hypnotize Minds, Sony Urban Music, Columbia; Formats: CD, LP, digital download | 10 | 3 | 2 | |
| Most Known Unknown | Released: September 27, 2005; Label: Hypnotize Minds, Sony Urban Music, Columbia; Formats: CD, LP, digital download | 3 | 1 | 1 | RIAA: Platinum |
| Last 2 Walk | Released: June 24, 2008; Label: Hypnotize Minds, Columbia; Formats: CD, digital download | 5 | 2 | 2 | |
"—" denotes a recording that did not chart or was not released in that territory. Billboard Top 25 Rap Albums began publication the week of November 13, 2004.

=== Subgroup albums ===
List of subgroup albums, with selected chart positions and certifications
| Title | Album details | Peak chart positions | | Certifications |
| Title | Album details | US | US R&B | Certifications |
|---|---|---|---|---|
| CrazyNDaLazDayz as Tear Da Club Up Thugs (DJ Paul, Juicy J and Lord Infamous) | Released: February 2, 1999; Label: Relativity; Formats: CD, cassette, digital download | 18 | 4 | RIAA: Gold |
| Watch What U Wish... as Da Mafia 6ix (DJ Paul, Lord Infamous, Crunchy Black and Koopsta Knicca) | Released: March 16, 2015; Label: Scale-A-Ton; Formats: CD, digital download | — | — | |
"—" denotes a recording that did not chart or was not released in that territory.

=== Posse albums ===
List of Posse albums, with selected chart positions and certifications
| Title | Album details | Peak chart positions | | |
| Title | Album details | US | US R&B | US Ind. |
|---|---|---|---|---|
| Body Parts as Prophet Posse (with Prophet Entertainment) | Released: February 24, 1998; Label: Prophet; Formats: CD, digital download | 168 | 54 | — |
| Hypnotize Camp Posse as Hypnotize Camp Posse (with Hypnotize Minds) | Released: January 25, 2000; Label: Hypnotize Minds, Relativity; Formats: CD, digital download | 36 | 11 | 1 |
"—" denotes a recording that did not chart or was not released in that territory. Billboard Independent Albums began publication the week of January 29, 2000.

=== Collaborative albums ===
Collaboration album, with selected chart positions
| Title | Album details | Peak chart positions | | |
| Title | Album details | US | US R&B | US Ind. |
|---|---|---|---|---|
| Dat's How It Happen to'M as Da Headbussaz (with Fiend) | Released: October 15, 2002; Label: Hypnotize Minds, Fiend; Formats: CD, digital download | 98 | 15 | 1 |
"—" denotes a recording that did not chart or was not released in that territory. Billboard Independent Albums began publication the week of January 29, 2000.

=== Compilation albums ===
List of compilation albums, with selected chart positions
| Title | Album details | Peak chart positions | | |
| Title | Album details | US | US R&B | US Rap |
|---|---|---|---|---|
| Underground Vol. 1: 1991–1994 | Released: March 2, 1999; Label: Relativity; Formats: CD, digital download | — | 46 | — |
| Underground Vol. 2: Club Memphis | Released: August 24, 1999; Label: Smoked Out; Formats: CD, digital download | — | 66 | — |
| Underground Vol. 3: Kings of Memphis | Released: October 31, 2000; Label: Loud; Formats: CD, digital download | 130 | 28 | — |
| Most Known Hits | Released: November 15, 2005; Label: Hypnotize Minds, Sony Urban Music, Columbia; Formats: CD, digital download | 154 | 38 | 21 |
| Smoked Out Music: Greatest Hits | Released: October 6, 2006; Label: Hypnotize Minds; Formats: CD, digital download | — | 48 | 22 |
| Prophet's Greatest Hits | Released: February 6, 2007; Label: Prophet, Hypnotize Minds; Formats: CD, digital download | — | 82 | — |
"—" denotes a recording that did not chart or was not released in that territory. Billboard Top 25 Rap Albums began publication the week of November 13, 2004.

== Extended plays ==
EP, with selected details
| Title | EP details |
|---|---|
| Live by Yo Rep | Released: November 21, 1995; Label: Prophet; Formats: CD, digital download |

== Mixtapes ==
List of mixtapes, with year released
| Title | Mixtape details |
|---|---|
| Smoked Out, Loced Out | Released: November 25, 1994; Label: Self-released; Formats: Cassette |
| We Never Sleep | Released: 2000; Label: Self-released; Format: Digital download |
| We Never Sleep Vol. 2 | Released: 2002; Label: Self-released; Format: Digital download |
| We Never Sleep Vol. 3 | Released: 2004; Label: Self-released; Format: Digital download |
| We Never Sleep Vol. 4 | Released: 2007; Label: Self-released; Format: Digital download |

=== Subgroup mixtapes ===
List of mixtapes, with year released
| Title | Mixtape details |
|---|---|
| 6ix Commandments as Da Mafia 6ix (DJ Paul, Lord Infamous, Crunchy Black, Gangsta Boo and Koopsta Knicca) | Released: November 12, 2013; Label: Self-released; Format: CD, digital download |
| Hear Sum Evil as Da Mafia 6ix (DJ Paul, Lord Infamous, Crunchy Black and Koopsta Knicca) | Released: October 30, 2014; Label: Self-released; Format: CD, digital download |

== Singles ==
=== As lead artist ===
List of singles as lead artist, with selected chart positions and certifications
| Title | Year | Peak chart positions | | | | Certifications | Album |
| Title | Year | US | US R&B | US Rap | UK | Certifications | Album |
|---|---|---|---|---|---|---|---|
| "Tear da Club Up" | 1995 | — | 70 | — | — | | Mystic Stylez |
| "Hit a Muthafucka" | 1997 | — | — | — | — | | Chapter 2: World Domination |
| "Late Night Tip" | 1997 | — | 76 | — | — | | Chapter 2: World Domination |
| "Who Run It" | 2000 | — | — (Note: "Who Run It" did not enter the Hot R&B/Hip-Hop Songs chart, but peaked at number 12 on the Bubbling Under R&B/Hip-Hop Singles chart.) | — | — | | When the Smoke Clears: Sixty 6, Sixty 1 |
| "Sippin' on Some Syrup" (featuring UGK and Project Pat) | 2000 | — (Note: "Sippin' on Some Syrup" did not enter the Billboard Hot 100, but peaked at number 13 on the Bubbling Under Hot 100 chart.) | 30 | — | — | | When the Smoke Clears: Sixty 6, Sixty 1 |
| "Tongue Ring" | 2000 | — | — (Note: "Tongue Ring" did not enter the Hot R&B/Hip-Hop Songs chart, but peaked at number two on the Bubbling Under R&B/Hip-Hop Singles chart.) | — | — | | When the Smoke Clears: Sixty 6, Sixty 1 |
| "Baby Mama" (featuring La Chat) | 2001 | — | 94 | — | — | | Baby Boy (soundtrack) & Choices: The Album |
| "Ridin' Spinners" (featuring Lil' Flip) | 2003 | — | 62 | — | — | | Da Unbreakables |
| "Stay Fly" (featuring Young Buck and 8Ball & MJG) | 2005 | 13 | 9 | 3 | 33 | RIAA: 2× Platinum; RMNZ: Platinum | Most Known Unknown |
| "Poppin' My Collar" (featuring Project Pat) | 2006 | 21 | 10 | 6 | — | RIAA: Platinum | Most Known Unknown |
| "Side 2 Side" (featuring Project Pat and Bow Wow) | 2006 | — (Note: "Side 2 Side" did not enter the Billboard Hot 100, but peaked at number 15 on the Bubbling Under Hot 100 chart.) | 63 | — | — | | Most Known Unknown |
| "Doe Boy Fresh" (featuring Chamillionaire) | 2007 | 54 | 74 | — | — | RIAA: Gold | Non-album singles |
| "Like Money" | 2007 | — | 89 | — | — | | Non-album singles |
| "I'd Rather" (featuring DJ Unk) | 2008 | — | 98 | — | — | | Last 2 Walk |
| "Lolli Lolli (Pop That Body)" (featuring Project Pat, Yung D and Superpower) | 2008 | 18 | 48 | 7 | — | RIAA: Platinum; RMNZ: Gold | Last 2 Walk |
| "That's Right" (featuring Akon) | 2008 | — | 97 | — | — | | Last 2 Walk |
| "Shake My" (featuring Kalenna) | 2009 | 75 | — | 22 | — | | Non-album singles |
| "Lil Freak (Ugh, Ugh, Ugh)" (featuring Webbie) | 2009 | — | 86 | — | — | | Non-album singles |
| "Feel It" (with Sean Kingston and Flo Rida vs. Tiësto) | 2009 | 78 | — | — | 83 | MC: Gold | Non-album singles |

=== As Da Mafia 6ix ===
List of singles as Da Mafia 6ix
| Title | Year | Album |
|---|---|---|
| "Go Hard" (featuring Yelawolf | 2013 | 6iX Commandments |
| "Remember" (featuring Lil Wyte) | 2013 | 6iX Commandments |
| "Break da Law" | 2013 | 6iX Commandments |
| "Beacon n Blender" | 2013 | 6iX Commandments |
| "Been Had Hard" | 2013 | 6iX Commandments |
| "Panic Mode" (featuring Young Wicked aka Otis) | 2014 | Reindeer Games (as The KillJoy Club with Insane Clown Posse) |
| "Surprize" (featuring Young Wicked aka Otis) | 2014 | Reindeer Games (as The KillJoy Club with Insane Clown Posse) |
| "Lock'm n da Trunk" (featuring DJ Zirk) | 2014 | Hear Sum Evil |
| "Payin' Top Dolla" (featuring Fiend and La Chat) | 2014 | Hear Sum Evil |
| "Hear Sum Evil Intro" | 2014 | Hear Sum Evil |
| "Hydrocodone" (featuring Charlie P) | 2014 | Hear Sum Evil |
| "Gimmi Back My Dope" | 2015 | Watch What U Wish... |
| "Residence Evil" (featuring Wacy Loco) | 2015 | Watch What U Wish... |
| "Forever Get High" (featuring Fiend) | 2015 | Watch What U Wish... |
| "Dat Ain't Inya" (featuring Fiend and La Chat) | 2015 | Watch What U Wish... |
| "You Can't" (featuring Lil Infamous and Locodunit [Seed of 6ix]) | 2015 | Watch What U Wish... |
| "No Good Deed" (featuring La Chat) | 2015 | Watch What U Wish... |
| "Hundid Thou Wow" (featuring La Chat and Billy Wes) | 2015 | Watch What U Wish... |
| "High Like an Eagle" (featuring Fiend and La Chat) | 2015 | Watch What U Wish... |
| "Gimmi Back My Dope (Remix)" (featuring Snootie Wild) | 2015 | Watch What U Wish...: Remixes-N-Singles |

== Guest appearances ==
List of single and non-single guest appearances, with other performing artists, showing year released and album name
| Title | Year | Other artist(s) | Album |
|---|---|---|---|
| "Threesixafix" | 1997 | —N/a | Southwest Riders |
| "2 Bogus" | 1998 | Crucial Conflict | Good Side, Bad Side |
| "Throw Them Thangs" | 1998 | Indo G | Angel Dust |
| "Fly Straight" | 1998 | Indo G, Prophet Posse | Angel Dust |
| "Wanna Be's" | 1999 | —N/a | Whiteboys (soundtrack) |
| "Ballers" | 1999 | Project Pat, Big Tymers, Hot Boyz | Ghetty Green |
| "Gold Shine" | 1999 | Project Pat | Ghetty Green |
| "Move Bitch" | 2000 | Lil' Jon & the East Side Boyz, YoungBloodZ, Chyna Whyte, Don Yute | We Still Crunk!! |
| "Don't Start Nuttin'" | 2000 | C-Loc | It's a Gamble |
| "Whatever" | 2000 | 5th Ward Weebie, Fiend, Mr. Serv-on | Ghetto Platinum |
| "Where itz Goin' Down" | 2000 | Twiztid, Blaze Ya Dead Homie, Anybody Killa | Freek Show |
| "War wit Us" | 2001 | —N/a | Oz (soundtrack) / Choices |
| "They Don't Fuck wit U" | 2001 | —N/a | Exit Wounds (soundtrack) / Choices |
| "Face Down" | 2001 | —N/a | Blazin' (soundtrack) |
| "Break da Law 2001" | 2001 | Funkmaster Flex, Project Pat | The Mix Tape, Vol. IV/ Mista Don't Play: Everythangs Workin |
| "Don't Stand So Close 2001" | 2001 | Gangsa Boo | Both Worlds *69 |
| "Like a Pimp" | 2001 | UGK | Dirty Money |
| "Go 2 Sleep" | 2001 | Ludacris, Fate Wilson, I-20 | Word of Mouf |
| "Rush" | 2002 | Ike Dirty | Dirty's Way |
| "Who Gives a Fuck Where You From" | 2004 | DJ Kay Slay, Lil' Wyte, Frayser Boy | The Streetsweeper, Vol. 2 |
| "Represent" | 2004 | Lil' Flip, David Banner | U Gotta Feel Me |
| "Take Ya Clothes Off" | 2004 | Play-n-Skillz | The Process |
| "Hennessey & Hydro" | 2004 | I-20 | Self Explanatory |
| "U.S. Soldier Boy" | 2004 | Lil' Wyte | Phinally Phamous |
| "Baby Mama" | 2004 | Holla Point | |
| "Gangster Walk" | 2005 | David Banner, 8Ball & MJG, Marcus | Certified |
| "4 Oz." | 2005 | Ying Yang Twins | U.S.A. Still United |
| "3, 2, 1, Go!" | 2005 | Lil' Flip | I Need Mine |
| "I'm a Playa" | 2005 | Paul Wall | The Peoples Champ |
| "Closing the Club" | 2005 | 112 | Pleasure & Pain |
| "Throw Me That Pack" | 2005 | Czar-Nok | That One Way |
| "Chulin Culin Chunfly (Remix)" | 2005 | Julio Voltio, Residente (Calle 13) | Voltio |
| "Get 'Em Shawty" | 2005 | Killer Mike | The Killer |
| "Don't Play with Me" | 2006 | Dem Franchize Boyz | On Top of Our Game |
| "Who's Gonna Ride" | 2006 | Christina Milian | So Amazin' |
| "Cadillac" | 2006 | Trae, Paul Wall, Jay'Ton, Lil' Boss | Restless |
| "Still Here" | 2006 | Lyfe Jennings, Project Pat | The Phoenix |
| "Hood Drug Warz" | 2006 | DJ Kay Slay & Greg Street, B.G. | The Champions: North Meets South |
| "Chop Me Up" | 2006 | Justin Timberlake, Timbaland | FutureSex/LoveSounds |
| "Club Gettin' Crowded" | 2006 | Chingy | Hoodstar |
| "Posted in the Club" | 2006 | Lil' Scrappy | Bred 2 Die, Born 2 Live |
| "Been Gettin' Money" | 2006 | Project Pat | Crook by da Book: The Fed Story |
| "Hood Rat" | 2006 | Young Jeezy, Project Pat | The Inspiration |
| "It's a Fight" | 2006 | —N/a | Rocky Balboa: The Best of Rocky |
| "Act a Fool" | 2006 | Lil' Jon | - |
| "Cruzin'" | 2007 | 8Ball & MJG, Slim | Ridin High |
| "What's the Business" | 2007 | Ali & Gipp | Kinfolk |
| "That Club Shit" | 2007 | N.O.R.E. | Noreality |
| "Gangsta" | 2007 | T-Hud, Project Pat | Undrafted |
| "Let's Get It" | 2007 | Ice Water Inc., Raekwon | Polluted Water |
| "Int'l Players Anthem (Remix)" | 2007 | UGK | Underground Kingz |
| "Wet Wet" | 2008 | Unk, Project Pat, Blazed | 2econd Season |
| "That'll Work" | 2009 | The Alchemist, Juvenile | Chemical Warfare |
| "Demons" | 2009 | Tech N9ne | K.O.D. |
| "Shuv It (Remix)" | 2009 | Santogold, Project Pat | —N/a |
| "Hikky-Burr" | 2010 | Quincy Jones, David Banner | Q Soul Bossa Nostra |
| "Watchu Waitin' For" | 2010 | Kevin Rudolf | To the Sky |
| "Late Night Automatic" | 2010 | Kevin Rudolf | To the Sky |
| "I Go Hard" | 2010 | Tino Cochino, DJ Frank E | —N/a |
| "I Wanna Get Drunk" | 2010 | DJ Felli Fel, Fatman Scoop, Lil' Jon | —N/a |
| "Mash It Up" | 2011 | Karl Wolf | Finally Free |
| "Posse Song" | 2011 | Lil Wyte, JellyRoll, BPZ, Project Pat, V-Slash, Lil Reno | Year Round |
| "Night of the Chainsaw" (Joe Strange Remix) | 2012 | Insane Clown Posse | Mike E. Clark's Extra Pop Emporium |
| "Smoke Good, Live Good (Remix)" | 2012 | TheBlkhands, Fenix | Serbia |
| "Just Do It" | 2014 | Butch Kid | —N/a |

=== Da Mafia 6ix ===
Guest appearance, with other performing artists, showing year released and album name
| Title | Year | Other artist(s) | Album |
|---|---|---|---|
| "Wasted Pt. 2" | 2014 | Twiztid, Chris Webby, Kung Fu Vampire, Whitney Peyton, R.A. the Rugged Man | Get Twiztid |

== Posse songs ==
| Title | Year | Album | Lead artist | Lyrics |
|---|---|---|---|---|
| "Mystic Styles" | 1995 | Mystic Stylez | Three 6 Mafia | Lil Fly, M.C. Mack, Gangsta Boo, La Chat, Crunchy Black, Koopsta Knicca, Lord Infamous, Juicy J, DJ Paul |
| "All About Them Prophets" | 1996 | King of da Playaz Ball | Kingpin Skinny Pimp | Gangsta Blac, Lord Infamous, M.C. Mack, Scan Man, Crunchy Black, Juicy J, DJ Paul, Mr. Slicc, 211, Kingpin Skinny Pimp |
| "Body Parts" | 1996 | Chapter 1: The End | Three 6 Mafia | K-Rock, M.C. Mack, M-Child, Indo G, Crunchy Black, Koopsta Knicca, Lord Infamous, Gangsta Boo, Juicy J, Gangsta Blac, DJ Paul |
| "Prophet Posse" | 1997 | Chapter 2: World Domination | Three 6 Mafia | Lord Infamous, Gangsta Boo, Scan Man, DJ Paul, Juicy J, Crunchy Black, Indo G, K-Rock, Project Pat |
| "Bodyparts 2" | 1997 | Chapter 2: World Domination | Three 6 Mafia | DJ Paul, Lord Infamous, Gangsta Boo, M-Child, Juicy J, Scan Man, Droopy Drew Dog, Crunchy Black, Project Pat, Indo G, K-Rock |
| Posse album | 1998 | Body Parts | Prophet Posse | Posse album |
| "Fly Straight" | 1998 | Angel Dust | Indo G | Droopy Drew Dog, Gangsta Boo, Scan Man, Nigga Creep, M.C. Mack, DJ Paul, Project Pat, Juicy J, Indo G |
| "Time's Up" | 1998 | Kamakazie: Timez Up | The Kaze | DJ Paul, Juicy J, Scan Man, Gangsta Boo, M.C. Mack, Project Pat |
| "Who We Be" | 1998 | Enquiring Minds | Gangsta Boo | Lord Infamous, Scan Man, Crunchy Black, Koopsta Knicca, Juicy J, M.C. Mack, DJ Paul, Project Pat, Gangsta Boo |
| "Hypnotize Minds / Profit Posse" | 1999 | CrazyNDaLazDayz | Tear Da Club Up Thugs (of Three 6 Mafia) | Koopsta Knicca, Crunchy Black, M.C. Mack, Scan Man, Lord Infamous, DJ Paul, Project Pat, Juicy J |
| "Rinky Dink/Whatever Ho" | 1999 | Ghetty Green | Project Pat | Juicy J, Lord Infamous, Crunchy Black, Scan Man, DJ Paul, M.C. Mack, T-Rock, Gangsta Boo, Project Pat |
| Posse album | 2000 | Three 6 Mafia Presents: Hypnotize Camp Posse | Hypnotize Camp Posse | Posse album |
| "M.E.M.P.H.I.S." | 2000 | When the Smoke Clears: Sixty 6, Sixty 1 | Three 6 Mafia | Project Pat, Lord Infamous, Juicy J, Young Buck (guest), Crunchy Black, La Chat, Koopsta Knicca, T-Rock, M.C. Mack, DJ Paul |
| "Fuckin' with the Best" | 2001 | Mista Don't Play: Everythangs Workin | Project Pat | Crunchy Black, Lord Infamous, La Chat, Juicy J, DJ Paul, Project Pat, T-Rock |
| "M-Town Representatives" | 2001 | Both Worlds *69 | Gangsta Boo | DJ Paul, Lord Infamous, Crunchy Black, Project Pat, La Chat, Juicy J, T-Rock, Gangsta Boo |
| "Mafia" | 2001 | Choices | Three 6 Mafia | La Chat, Gangsta Boo, Crunchy Black, Juicy J, Project Pat, Lord Infamous, DJ Paul |
| "Wolf Pack" | 2001 | Murder She Spoke | La Chat | Gangsta Boo, Crunchy Black, Frayser Boy, Lord Infamous, DJ Paul, Juicy J, La Chat |
| "King of Kings" | 2002 | Underground Volume 16: For da Summa | DJ Paul | Lord Infamous, La Chat, Juicy J, Frayser Boy, Crunchy Black, DJ Paul |
| "Mafia Niggaz" | 2002 | Chronicles of the Juice Man | Juicy J | Juicy J, La Chat, Crunchy Black, Frayser Boy, DJ Paul, Lord Infamous |
| "Posse Song" (Layin' da Smack Down) | 2002 | Layin' da Smack Down | Project Pat | Project Pat, Crunchy Black, DJ Paul, La Chat, Lord Infamous, Juicy J, Frayser Boy |
| "Get High To This" | 2003 | Doubt Me Now | Lil Wyte | DJ Paul, Juicy J, Crunchy Black, La Chat, Frayser Boy, Lil Wyte |
| "Dangerous Posse" | 2003 | Da Unbreakables | Three 6 Mafia | Juicy J, Crunchy Black, Lord Infamous, Frayser Boy, Lil Wyte, DJ Paul |
| "H.C.P." (Gone on That Bay) | 2003 | Gone on That Bay | Frayser Boy | DJ Paul, Crunchy Black, Juicy J, Lord Infamous, Lil Wyte, Frayser Boy |
| "Possie Song" (Phinally Phamous) | 2004 | Phinally Phamous | Lil Wyte | Crunchy Black, Frayser Boy, Lord Infamous, DJ Paul, Juicy J, Lil Wyte |
| "Posse Song" (Choices II: The Setup) | 2005 | Choices II: The Setup | Three 6 Mafia | Lil Wyte, Frayser Boy, Crunchy Black, Juicy J, Lord Infamous, DJ Paul |
| "Posse Song (H.C.P.)" (Me Being Me) | 2005 | Me Being Me | Frayser Boy | Frayser Boy, Lil Wyte, Lord Infamous, Juicy J, DJ Paul, Boogiemane, Crunchy Black, Chrome |
| "Body Parts 3" | 2005 | Most Known Unknown | Three 6 Mafia | Crunchy Black, Boogiemane, Frayser Boy, Lil Wyte, Chrome, Granddaddy Souf, Juicy J, Project Pat, DJ Paul |
| "H.C.P." (Straight to the Pros) | 2005 | Straight to the Pros | Chrome | DJ Paul, Frayser Boy, Juicy J, Crunchy Black, Boogiemane, Lil Wyte, Chrome |
| "Posse Song" (Year Round) | 2011 | Year Round | SNO | Juicy J, Project Pat, DJ Paul, Lil Reno, V-Slash, Jelly Roll, BPZ, Lil Wyte |
| "Body Parts 4" | 2013 | 6ix Commandments | Da Mafia 6ix (of Three 6 Mafia) | Juicy J, Koopsta Knicca, Kingpin Skinny Pimp, Lil Wyte, Crunchy Black, La Chat, Project Pat, Locodunit, Point Blank, JGrxxn, Kokoe, Lord Infamous, Gangsta Boo, DJ Paul |

== Production credits ==
Big Kuntry King

- 00. "Throwback 2004" (featuring T.I.)

Chingy – Hoodstar

- 03. "Club Gettin' Crowded" (featuring Three 6 Mafia)

=== DJ Kay Slay - The Streetsweeper, Vol. 2 ===
- 04. "Who Gives a Fuck Where You From" (feat. Three 6, Lil Wyte, Frazier

Fresh

- 00. "What Chu Lookin At?"

Goodie Mob – One Monkey Don't Stop No Show

- 03. "1,2,3, Goodie"

Eevil Stöö – Eevil Stöön Joulumanteli + Rusinat

- 01. "Eevil Stöö Matkaan Jo Käy"

I-20 – Self Explanatory

- 08. "Hennessey and Hydro" (featuring Three 6 Mafia)

=== Killer Mike - The Monster ===
- 01. "Get Em Shawty" (feat. Three 6 Mafia)

Knif

- 00. A Spartan in Wake"

Lil Flip – I Need Mine/U Gotta Feel Me

- 07. "Represent" (featuring Three 6 Mafia, David Banner)
- 08. "3,2,1 Go!" (featuring Three 6 Mafia)
- 15. "I Just Wanna Tell U"

Lil Scrappy – Bred 2 Die Born 2 Live

- 07. "Posted in the Club" (featuring Three 6 Mafia)

Lil Scrappy

- 00. "Highest Investment"

Ludacris – Chicken-n-Beer

- 07. Diamond in the Back (featuring William DeVaugn)
- 16. "We Got" (featuring Chingy, I-20 and Tity Boi)

Ludacris

- 00. "Neville Bryce"

Mike Jones – Who Is Mike Jones?

- 05. "Got It Sewed Up (Remix)"

Pastor Troy – Tool Muziq

- 05. "Wanting You" (featuring Gangsta Boo)

Paul Wall – The Peoples Champ

- 01. "I'm a Playa" (featuring Three 6 Mafia)

Santogold – Santogold

- 00. "Shove It" (featuring Project Pat)

South Breed

- 00. "Hustleville"

Stat Quo

- 00. "Closed Mouths" (featuring T.I.)
- 00. "Slippin Sumthin"

T.C.

- 00. "If You Got a Problem"
- "Pop It for Some Paper" – Terrence Howard (DJay)
- "Stomp" – Young Buck (featuring T.I. & Ludacris)
- "Takin Hits" – Young Buck (featuring D–Tay)
- "International Player's Anthem" - UGK (featuring Outkast)
- "Hood Rat" – Young Jeezy (featuring Three 6 Mafia & Project Pat)
- "Plays" - Criminal Manne & Frayser Boy (featuring Gucci Mane)

== Music videos ==
=== As lead artist ===
- "Tear Da Club Up '97"
- "Late Night Tip" (1997)
- "Hit a Muthafucka"
- "Who Run It" (2000)
- "Sippin on Some Syzurp" (featuring UGK & Project Pat)
- "Tongue Ring"
- "2-Way Freak" (featuring La Chat) (2001)
- "Baby Mama" (featuring La Chat)
- "Ridin' Spinners" (featuring Lil Flip) (2003)
- "Ghetto Chick"
- "Who I Iz" (featuring Trillville, Lil Wyte, Frayser Boy) (2005)
- "Stay Fly" (featuring 8Ball, MJG & Young Buck)
- "Poppin My Collar" (featuring Project Pat)
- "Side 2 Side" [Clean Version] (featuring Bow Wow)
- "Side 2 Side" (Explicit Version)
- "Doe Boy Fresh" (featuring Chamillionaire) (2007)
- "I'd Rather" (featuring DJ Unk)
- "Lolli Lolli (Pop That Body)" (featuring Project Pat, Yung D & Superpower) (2008)
- "That's Right" (featuring Akon)
- "Lil Freak (Ugh Ugh Ugh)" (featuring Webbie) (2009)
- "Shake My" (featuring Kalenna)
- "Feel It" (vs. Tiësto with Flo Rida & Sean Kingston)
- "Shots After Shots" (featuring Tech N9ne)
- "Keep My Name Out Yo Mouth" (featuring Project Pat, Billy Wes & Waka Flocka Flame)
- "Throwed Off"

=== As Da Mafia 6ix ===
- "Go Hard" (featuring Yelawolf)
- "Remember" (featuring Lil Wyte)
- "Where Is Da Bud"
- "Break Da Law"
- "Beacon N Blender"
- "Been Had Hard"
- "Surprize" (with Insane Clown Posse as The Killjoy Club) (featuring Young Wicked aka Otis)
- "Lock'm N Da Trunk" (featuring DJ Zirk)
- "Hear Sum Evil Intro"
- "Hydrocodone" (featuring Charlie P)
- "Residence Evil"
- "Gimmi Back My Dope (Remix)" (featuring Snootie Wild)
- "Forever Get High" (featuring Fiend & La Chat)
- "Dat Ain't Inya" (*featuring Fiend & La Chat)
- "You Can't" (featuring Lil Infamous & Locodunit)
- "No Good Deed" (featuring La Chat)
- "Hundid Thou Wow" (featuring Billy Wes)
- "High Like an Eagle" (featuring Fiend & La Chat)
- "As the Tear da Club Up Thugs"
- "Push 'em Off"
- "Playa Why U Hatin'" (featuring Hot Boys & The Big Tymers)
