= Lord Infamous discography =

This is the discography of American rapper, Lord Infamous.

== Albums ==
=== Solo albums ===
Title	Album information
Lord Of Terror (Solo Tape)	Released: 1993; Label: Prophet; Chart Positions: N/A; RIAA Certification: N/A; Singles: N/A
The Man, The Myth, The Legacy	Released: October 23, 2007; Label: Black Rain Ent, Oarfin; Chart Positions: N/A; RIAA Certification: N/A; Singles: N/A
Futuristic Rowdy Bounty Hunter	Released: June 29, 2010; Label: Black Rain Ent; Chart Positions: N/A; RIAA Certification: N/A; Singles: N/A
Scarecrow Tha Terrible	Released: November 11, 2011; Label: 6th Enterprise, Frontline Muzik; Chart Positions: N/A; RIAA Certification: N/A; Singles: N/A
Legendary Hits	Released: January 13, 2012; Label: 6th Enterprise; Chart Positions: N/A; RIAA Certification: N/A; Singles: N/A
King of Horrorcore	Released: July 18, 2012; Label: 6th Enterprise; Chart Positions: N/A; RIAA Certification: N/A; Singles: N/A
Back From Tha Dead (Deadly Proverbs)	Released: October 30, 2012; Label: Wyte Music; Chart Positions: N/A; RIAA Certification: N/A; Singles: N/A
Scarecrow Tha Terrible Part 2	Released: February 15, 2013; Label: 6th Enterprise; Chart Positions: N/A; RIAA Certification: N/A
Legend	Released: October 31, 2014; Label: 6th Enterprise; Chart Positions: N/A; RIAA Certification: N/A; Singles: N/A

=== Albums With Black Rain Ent/Club House Click ===
Title	Album information
After Sics	Released: January 27, 2009; Label: Back Rain Ent, Oarfin; Chart Positions: N/A; RIAA Certification: N/A; Singles: N/A
Blood Money	Released: July 28, 2009; Label: Back Rain Ent, Oarfin; Chart Positions: N/A; RIAA Certification: N/A; Singles: N/A
Helloween EP	Released: October 31, 2009; Label: Black Rain Ent; Chart Positions: N/A; RIAA Certification: N/A; Singles: N/A
Helloween EP Part 2: The Rise Of Satan	Released: October 26, 2010; Label: Black Rain Ent; Chart Positions: N/A; RIAA Certification: N/A; Singles: N/A
The Crucifixion	Released: April 22, 2011; Label: Black Rain Ent; Chart Positions: N/A; RIAA Certification: N/A; Singles: N/A
The Resurrection	Released: May 13, 2011; Label: Black Rain Ent; Chart Positions: N/A; RIAA Certification: N/A; Singles: N/A
Helloween EP Part 3: 666	Released: October 31, 2011; Label: Black Rain Ent; Chart Positions: N/A; RIAA Certification: N/A; Singles: N/A
Welcome To The Darkside: The Re-Ups Chpt. 1	Released: November 25, 2011; Label: Black Rain Ent, S.C. Productz; Chart Positions: N/A; RIAA Certification: N/A; Singles: N/A
Land Of Da Lost	Released: November 27, 2012; Label: Black Rain Ent; Chart Positions: N/A; RIAA Certification: N/A; Singles: N/A
Greatest Hits	Released: February 26, 2013; Label: Black Rain Ent; Chart Positions: N/A; RIAA Certification: N/A; Singles: N/A
The Crucifixion/The Resurrection Part 2	Released: March 29, 2013; Label: Black Rain Ent; Chart Positions: N/A; RIAA Certification: N/A; Singles: N/A

=== Albums With Three 6 Mafia ===
Title	Album information
Smoked Out, Loced Out	Released: November 25, 1994; Label: Prophet; Chart Positions: N/A; RIAA Certification: N/A; Singles: N/A
Mystic Stylez	Released: May 30, 1995; Label: Prophet; Chart Positions: #59 R&B; RIAA Certification: N/A; Singles: N/A
Live by Yo Rep EP	Released: November 21, 1995; Label: Prophet; Chart Positions: N/A; RIAA Certification: N/A; Singles: N/A
Chapter 1: The End	Released: March 4, 1997; Label: Prophet; Chart Positions: #126 US Billboard 200, #42 R&B; RIAA Certification: N/A; Singles: N/A
Chapter 2: World Domination	Released: November 4, 1997; Label: Relativity; Chart Positions: #40 US Billboard 200, #18 R&B; RIAA Certification: Gold; Singles: "Hit A Muthafucka", "Late Nite Tip", "Tear Da Club Up '97"
Underground Vol. 1: (1991-1994)	Released: March 16, 1999; Label: Smoked Out; Chart Positions: N/A; RIAA Certification: N/A; Singles: N/A
Underground Vol. 2: Club Memphis	Released: August 24, 1999; Label: Prophet, Smoked Out; Chart Positions: N/A; RIAA Certification: N/A; Singles: N/A
When the Smoke Clears: Sixty 6, Sixty 1	Released: June 13, 2000; Label: Relativity; Chart Positions: #6 US Billboard 200, #2 R&B, #1 Independent; RIAA Certification: Platinum; Singles: "Sippin' on Some Syrup", "Tongue Ring", "Who Run It"
Underground Vol. 3: Kings of Memphis	Released: October 25, 2000; Label: Smoked Out; Chart Positions: N/A; RIAA Certification: N/A; Singles: N/A
Hypnotize Camp Posse	Released: January 25, 2000; Label: Hypnotize Minds, Relativity; Chart Positions: N/A; RIAA Certification: N/A; Singles: N/A
Choices: The Album	Released: October 30, 2001; Label: Loud, Relativity; Chart Positions: #19 US Billboard 200, #4 R&B, #4 Soundtracks; RIAA Certification: N/A; Singles: "Baby Mama", "2-Way Freak"
Da Unbreakables	Released: June 24, 2003; Label: Hypnotize Minds, Sony; Chart Positions: #4 US Billboard 200, #2 R&B; RIAA Certification: Gold; Singles: "Ghetto Chick", "Ridin' Spinners"
Choices II: The Setup	Released: April 19, 2005; Label: Hypnotize Minds, Sony; Chart Positions: #10 US Billboard 200, #3 R&B, #1 Top Soundtrack; RIAA Certification: N/A; Singles: "Who I Is"
Most Known Hits	Released: November 15, 2005; Label: Hypnotize Minds, Sony; Chart Positions: #154 US Billboard 200, #21 Rap, #38 R&B; RIAA Certification: N/A; Singles: N/A
Smoked Out Music Greatest Hits	Released: October 3, 2006; Label: Hypnotize Minds, Smoked Out; Chart Positions: N/A; RIAA Certification: N/A; Singles: N/A
Prophet's Greatest Hits	Released: February 6, 2007; Label: Hypnotize Minds; Chart Positions: N/A; RIAA Certification: N/A; Singles: N/A

=== The Serial Killers (DJ Paul & Lord Infamous) ===
Title	Album information
The Serial Killers: Portrait Of A Serial Killa	Released: 1992; Label: N/A; Chart Positions: N/A; RIAA Certification: N/A; Singles: N/A
The Serial Killers: Da Serial Killaz	Released: 1993; Label: N/A; Chart Positions: N/A; RIAA Certification: N/A; Singles: N/A
DJ Paul & Lord Infamous: Come With Me 2 Hell	Released: 1994; Label: N/A; Chart Positions: N/A; RIAA Certification: N/A; Singles: N/A
DJ Paul & Lord Infamous: Come With Me 2 Hell Part 2	Released: 1995; Label: N/A; Chart Positions: N/A; RIAA Certification: N/A; Singles: N/A

=== Albums With Tear Da Club Up Thugs ===
Title	Album information
CrazyNDaLazDayz	Released: February 2, 1999; Label: Relativity; Chart Positions: N/A; RIAA Certification: Gold; Singles: "Push Em Off", "Slob on My Knob" and "Hypnotize Cash Money"

== Singles ==
=== As lead artist ===
Year	Artist	Song	U.S. Hot 100	U.S. R&B	U.S. Rap	RIAA	Album
1997	Three 6 Mafia	"Hit A Muthafucka"	—	—	—	—	Chapter 2: World Domination
1997	Three 6 Mafia	"Late Nite Tip"	—	—	—	—	Chapter 2: World Domination
1997	Three 6 Mafia	"Tear Da Club Up '97"	—	70	—	—	Chapter 2: World Domination
2000	Three 6 Mafia	"Who Run It"	—	116	—	—	When the Smoke Clears: Sixty 6, Sixty 1
2000	Three 6 Mafia	"Sippin' on Some Syrup" (Feat. UGK & Project Pat)	—	26	—	—	When the Smoke Clears: Sixty 6, Sixty 1
2000	Three 6 Mafia	"Tongue Ring"	—	—	—	—	When the Smoke Clears: Sixty 6, Sixty 1
2001	Three 6 Mafia	"Baby Mama" (Feat. La Chat)	—	—	—	—	Choices: The Album
2001	Three 6 Mafia	"2-Way Freak" (Feat. La Chat)	—	—	—	—	Choices: The Album
2003	Three 6 Mafia	"Ridin' Spinners" (Feat. Lil' Flip)	—	62	—	—	Da Unbreakables
2003	Three 6 Mafia	"Ghetto Chick"	—	—	—	—	Da Unbreakables
2005	Three 6 Mafia	"Who I Is" (Feat. Trillville)	—	—	—	—	Choices II: The Setup

=== As Featured On ===
Year	Artist	Song	U.S. Hot 100	U.S. R&B	U.S. Rap	RIAA	Album
2009	DJ Paul	"You On't Want It" (Feat. Lord Infamous)	—	—	—	—	Scale-A-Ton
2009	DJ Paul	"I'm Drunk (Remix)" (Feat. Lord Infamous & Lil' Wyte)	—	—	—	—	Scale-A-Ton
2012	Smallwood	"Light Bill" (Feat. Lord Infamous & Ace)	—	—	—	—	Light Bill (feat. Lord Infamous & Ace
2012	Monster Mill	"Cut From The Same Cloth" (Feat. Lord Infamous)	—	—	—	—	Deadly Ambition

== Music videos ==
=== As lead artist ===
Year	Artist	Song	U.S. Hot 100	U.S. R&B	U.S. Rap	RIAA	Album
1997	Three 6 Mafia	"Hit A Muthafucka"	—	—	—	—	Chapter 2: World Domination
1997	Three 6 Mafia	"Late Nite Tip"	—	—	—	—	Chapter 2: World Domination
1997	Three 6 Mafia	"Tear Da Club Up '97"	—	70	—	—	Chapter 2: World Domination
2000	Three 6 Mafia	"Who Run It"	—	116	—	—	When the Smoke Clears: Sixty 6, Sixty 1
2000	Three 6 Mafia	"Sippin' on Some Syrup" (Feat. UGK & Project Pat)	—	26	—	—	When the Smoke Clears: Sixty 6, Sixty 1
2000	Three 6 Mafia	"Tongue Ring"	—	—	—	—	When the Smoke Clears: Sixty 6, Sixty 1
2003	Three 6 Mafia	"Ridin' Spinners" (Feat. Lil' Flip)	—	62	—	—	Da Unbreakables
2003	Three 6 Mafia	"Ghetto Chick"	—	—	—	—	Da Unbreakables

=== As Featured On ===
Year	Artist	Song	U.S. Hot 100	U.S. R&B	U.S. Rap	RIAA	Album
2009	DJ Paul	"You On't Want It" (Feat. Lord Infamous)	—	—	—	—	Scale-A-Ton
2012	Psycho	"Blazin' Kush" (Feat. Lord Infamous)	—	—	—	—	NA
