= Most Known Hits =

Greatest hits album by Three 6 Mafia
- Released: November 15, 2005
- Recorded: 1996–2005
- Genre: Southern hip-hop; gangsta rap; crunk; dirty rap; hardcore hip-hop
- Label: Hypnotize Minds; Columbia; Sony Urban
- Producer: DJ Paul; Juicy J

Three 6 Mafia chronology
Most Known Unknown (2005)	Most Known Hits (2005)	Last 2 Walk (2008)

Most Known Hits is an album by hip-hop group Three 6 Mafia on November 15, 2005, by Hypnotize Minds, Columbia Records, and Sony Urban Music. It is a collection of some of their biggest mainstream songs and was released in 2005, following the similarly titled studio album, Most Known Unknown.

AllMusic noted about the album, "Newly intrigued listeners who were turned on to Three 6 Mafia in the wake of 'Stay Fly' should find this release very beneficial."

== Track listing ==
Artist	Track number	Song	Length	Year	Original album
Three 6 Mafia	01	"Ridin' Spinners" (featuring Lil Flip)	4:20	2003	Da Unbreakables
Three 6 Mafia	02	"Sippin' on Some Syrup" (featuring UGK & Project Pat)	4:21	2000	When the Smoke Clears: Sixty 6, Sixty 1
Three 6 Mafia	03	"Tear Da Club Up '97"	3:40	1997	Chapter 2: World Domination
Three 6 Mafia	04	"Hit a Muthafucka"	3:55	1997	Chapter 2: World Domination
Tear Da Club Up Thugs	05	"Slob on My Knob"	1:59	1999	CrazyNDaLazDayz
Three 6 Mafia	06	"Who Run It"	4:09	2000	When the Smoke Clears: Sixty 6, Sixty 1
Hypnotize Camp Posse	07	"Azz & Tittiez" (featuring La Chat)	5:34	2000	Three 6 Mafia Presents: Hypnotize Camp Posse
Three 6 Mafia	08	"Squeeze It" (featuring Lil Wyte, Frayser Boy)	3:47	2005	Choices II: The Setup
Tear Da Club Up Thugs	09	"Hypnotize Cash Money" (featuring Hot Boys, Birdman)	4:22	1999	CrazyNDaLazDayz
Three 6 Mafia	10	"Late Nite Tip"	4:42	1997	Chapter 1: The End
Three 6 Mafia	11	"2-Way Freak" (featuring La Chat)	4:55	2001	Choices: The Album
Three 6 Mafia	12	"Baby Mama" (featuring La Chat)	4:42	2001	Choices: The Album
Three 6 Mafia	13	"Put Ya Signs"	4:11	2000	When the Smoke Clears: Sixty 6, Sixty 1
Three 6 Mafia	14	"Tongue Ring"	4:04	2000	When the Smoke Clears: Sixty 6, Sixty 1
Three 6 Mafia	15	"Testin' My Gangsta"	4:37	2003	Da Unbreakables
Three 6 Mafia	16	"Let Me Hit That" (featuring Boogimane)	3:37	2005	Previously unreleased
Project Pat	17	"Don't Turn Around" (featuring Project Pat)	4:04	2003	Mix Tape: The Appeal
