= Tear Da Club Up (disambiguation) =

"Tear da Club Up" is a 1995 song by Three 6 Mafia.

Tear Da Club Up may also refer to:

- "Tear Da Club Up", a song by LeToya Luckett from the 2006 album LeToya
- "Tear Da Club Up (Original)", a song by DJ Paul and Lord Infamous from the 1995 album Come with Me 2 Hell Part 2
- "Tear Da Club Up", a 1999 song by DJ Class
