= Like Money =

Like Money may refer to:

- "Like Money" (song), a single by the Wonder Girls
- "Like Money", a 2007 song by Three 6 Mafia
