= Watch What U Wish... =

Studio album by Da Mafia 6ix
- Released: March 6, 2015 (digital); March 10, 2015 (physical)
- Recorded: 2013–2014
- Genres: Trap; horrorcore; gangsta rap; hardcore hip-hop
- Length: 78:27
- Label: Scale-A-Ton Entertainment
- Producers: DJ Paul; TWhy; Hot Rod; 808 Mafia

Da Mafia 6ix chronology
Hear Sum Evil (2014)	Watch What U Wish... (2015)

Singles from Watch What U Wish...
- 1. "Gimmi Back My Dope (featuring Lord Infamous)" Released: January 31, 2015; 2. "Residence Evil (featuring Wacy Loco" Released: February 3, 2015; 3. "Gimmi Back My Dope (Remix) (featuring Snootie Wild)" Released: February 18, 2015; 4. "Forever Get High (featuring Fiend)" Released: February 24, 2015; 5. "Dat Ain't Inya (featuring Fiend & La Chat)" Released: March 5, 2015; 6. "You Can't (featuring Locodunit & Lil Infamous [Seed of 6iX])" Released: March 26, 2015; 7. "No Good Deed (featuring La Chat)" Released: April 22, 2015; 8. "Hundid Thou Wow (featuring La Chat & Billy Wes)" Released: May 5, 2015; 9. "High Like An Eagle (featuring Lord Infamous, Fiend & La Chat)" Released: May 18, 2015

Watch What U Wish... is the debut studio album by American hip-hop group Da Mafia 6ix, released on March 6, 2015 digitally and March 10, 2015 physically. The album features guest appearances from former No Limit Records artist Fiend, Insane Clown Posse, Lil Wyte, La Chat, Locodunit, Lil Infamous, Billy Wes, Wacy Loco, Mariah Jane, and others.

The album charted at No. 25 in Billboard's Top 25 Heatseekers chart for April 4, 2015.

== Background ==
This was the first official studio album release from Da Mafia 6ix as a collective following their mixtapes 6iX Commandments and Hear Sum Evil as well as their collaborative album with Insane Clown Posse titled Reindeer Games.

The album originally was slated to include members DJ Paul, Crunchy Black, Koopsta Knicca, Lord Infamous and Gangsta Boo. This however changed following the death of Lord Infamous in December 2013 and Gangsta Boo's departure from the group in early 2014. However, the album still featured vocals from Lord Infamous recorded before his untimely death. The album also includes a verse from Lord Infamous's son "Lil Infamous".

The album's release date was originally planned for October 31, 2014, but in order to promote the album more was pushed back and the group's second Mixtape Hear Sum Evil was released instead. The group then announced a March 3 release date, but it was pushed back again just three days to March 6.

The Watch What U Wish: Singles-N-Remixes mixtape was planned to be released in 2015.

== Critical reception ==
Watch What U Wish... received generally positive reviews from critics. HipHopDX gave the album a rating of 3.5. out of 5 stating that "Sans Gangsta Boo and lightly seasoned appearances from the late Lord Infamous, Watch What U Wish is still a hellishly good time from Da Mafia 6ix." and also "By now, Da Mafia Six completely understands’ their fanbase and doesn’t even attempt to veer outside of that box."

== Singles and music videos ==
- The official audio for the track "Gimmi Back My Dope" featuring Lord Infamous was released on January 31, 2015.
- The official visual of an excerpt of the track "Residence Evil" was released on February 3, 2015.
- A remix to the track "Gimmi Back My Dope" featuring Snootie Wild was released on February 5, 2015.
- The full audio to "Residence Evil" was released on February 12, 2014.
- The official video to "Gimmi Back My Dope" Remix featuring Snootie Wild was released February 18, 2015.
- The official video to "Forever Get High" featuring Fiend was released February 24, 2015.
- The official video to "Dat Ain't Inya" featuring Fiend & La Chat was released March 5, 2015.
- The official video to "You Can't" featuring the Seed of 6iX collective (Locodunit & Lil Infamous) was released on March 26, 2015.
- The official video to "No Good Deed" featuring La Chat was released April 22, 2015.
- The official video to "Hundid Thou Wow" featuring La Chat & Billy Wes was released May 5, 2015.
- The official video to "High Like An Eagle" featuring Lord Infamous, Fiend & La Chat was released May 18, 2015.

== Track listing ==
No.	Title	Producer(s)	Length
1.	"Watch What U Wish..."	DJ Paul	0:56
2.	"Dat Ain't Inya" (featuring La Chat & Fiend)	DJ Paul; 808 Mafia	4:26
3.	"50 Bands" (featuring Lord Infamous)	DJ Paul; TWhy	3:50
4.	"Gimmi Back My Dope" (featuring Lord Infamous)	DJ Paul	4:39
5.	"Walk Wit Me" (featuring Lord Infamous & Locodunit)	DJ Paul	4:33
6.	"Why Must I Sweat Da Track" (featuring Fiend)	DJ Paul; TWhy	4:06
7.	"Forever Get High" (featuring Fiend)	DJ Paul	5:28
8.	"Hundid Thou Wow" (featuring Billy Wes & La Chat)	DJ Paul	4:10
9.	"Residence Evil" (featuring Wacy Loco)	DJ Paul	2:55
10.	"No Good Deed" (featuring La Chat)	DJ Paul; Hot Rod	4:50
11.	"Back On Dat Hype" (featuring Lord Infamous)	DJ Paul; TWhy	4:12
12.	"Do Dabs" (featuring Mariah Jane)	DJ Paul; TWhy	4:38
13.	"Come Get Sum"	DJ Paul	3:40
14.	"By Myself" (featuring La Chat)	DJ Paul	3:49
15.	"High Like An Eagle" (featuring Lord Infamous, La Chat & Fiend)	DJ Paul; TWhy	5:40
16.	"Mosh Pit" (performed by The Killjoy Club featuring Lil Wyte)	DJ Paul	4:48
17.	"We Be Goin' In" (featuring Lord Infamous)	DJ Paul; TWhy	3:51
18.	"You Can't" (featuring Seed of 6iX (Locodunit & Lil Infamous))	DJ Paul	4:58
19.	"Next"	DJ Paul	2:58
Total length:			78:27
