= Chapter 1: The End =

Studio album by Three 6 Mafia
- Released: December 3, 1996
- Recorded: 1995–1996
- Genres: Memphis rap; horrorcore; hardcore hip-hop; gangsta rap
- Length: 73:53
- Label: Prophet
- Producers: DJ Paul; Juicy J

Three 6 Mafia chronology
| Live by Yo Rep (B.O.N.E. Dis) (1995) | Chapter 1: The End (1996) | Chapter 2: World Domination (1997) |

Professional ratings
Review scores
| Source | Rating |
|---|---|
| AllMusic | 3.5/5 stars |

Chapter 1: The End, or simply The End, is the second studio album by American hip-hop group Three 6 Mafia. It is the follow-up to their debut album Mystic Stylez. The album was released on December 3, 1996, by Prophet Entertainment. This album shows a distinct change in production from their debut album.

“Walk Up 2 Yo House” is a re-recorded song of the same name, which originally appeared on the group’s 1994 mixtape Smoked Out, Loced Out.

== Track listing ==
- All songs are produced by DJ Paul and Juicy J.

| No. | Title | Lyrics | Length |
|---|---|---|---|
| 1. | "Our Arrival" (skit) | | 0:54 |
| 2. | "Stomp" | Koopsta Knicca; Lord Infamous; Juicy J; DJ Paul | 4:10 |
| 3. | "Money Flow" (featuring K-Rock) | K-Rock; DJ Paul; Koopsta Knicca; Gangsta Boo; Lord Infamous; Juicy J | 4:06 |
| 4. | "Late Nite Tip" | Lord Infamous; Gangsta Boo; DJ Paul; Juicy J; Koopsta Knicca | 5:16 |
| 5. | "Gotcha Shakin'" | Gangsta Boo; Juicy J; Lord Infamous; DJ Paul | 6:14 |
| 6. | "I Ain't Goin'" | Lord Infamous; Koopsta Knicca; Juicy J; DJ Paul | 3:54 |
| 7. | "Good Stuff" | DJ Paul; Lord Infamous; Gangsta Boo; Crunchy Black; Juicy J; Koopsta Knicca | 4:16 |
| 8. | "Walk Up 2 Yo House" | Juicy J; Gangsta Boo; Koopsta Knicca; Lord Infamous; DJ Paul | 4:33 |
| 9. | "In 2 Deep" | Lord Infamous; Koopsta Knicca; Gangsta Boo; Juicy J; DJ Paul | 3:50 |
| 10. | "Last Man Standing" (featuring Gangsta Blac & M-Child) | Lord Infamous; Gangsta Boo; Juicy J; DJ Paul; Gangsta Blac; M-Child | 5:03 |
| 11. | "Destruction Terror" | Koopsta Knicca; DJ Paul; Juicy J; Gangsta Boo; Lord Infamous | 3:57 |
| 12. | "Body Parts" (featuring Prophet Posse) | K-Rock; M.C. Mack; M-Child; Indo G; Crunchy Black; Koopsta Knicca; Lord Infamous; Gangsta Boo; Juicy J; Gangsta Blac; DJ Paul | 5:30 |
| 13. | "Where's Da Bud" | Lord Infamous | 3:57 |
| 14. | "Gette'm Crunk" | Koopsta Knicca; Lord Infamous; Juicy J; Gangsta Boo; DJ Paul | 4:24 |
| 15. | "Where da Killaz Hang" (featuring Project Pat) | Lord Infamous; Juicy J; Koopsta Knicca; Crunchy Black; Project Pat | 5:19 |
| 16. | "The End" (Instrumental) | | 4:16 |
| 17. | "Life or Death" (featuring Killa Klan Kaze) | M.C. Mack; K-Rock; Koopsta Knicca | 4:14 |
| Total length: | | | 73:53 |

== Credits ==
- Three 6 Mafia:
  - DJ Paul – rap, producer, executive producer, keyboards, scratching
  - Juicy J – rap, producer, executive producer, scratching
  - Lord Infamous – rap
  - Koopsta Knicca – rap
  - Gangsta Boo – rap
  - Crunchy Black – rap
- Jeanine Sharisse Norman and Shontelle Norman – vocals ("Good Stuff")
- DJ Slicse Tee – programming, scratching, keyboards
- Nick Jackson – executive producer
- Insane Wayne – piano ("Life or Death")
- DJ Jus Borne – recording, mixing
- Larry Nix – mastering
- Julious Carr – photography
- Niko Lyras – recording, mixing

== Charts ==
| Chart (1996) | Peak position |
|---|---|
| US Billboard 200 | 126 |
| US Top R&B/Hip-Hop Albums (Billboard) | 42 |
