= Underground Vol. 2: Club Memphis =

Compilation album by Three 6 Mafia
- Released: August 24, 1999
- Recorded: 1991–1993
- Genre: Horrorcore; gangsta rap; Memphis rap; crunk; hardcore hip-hop
- Length: 57:13
- Label: Smoked Out Music, Street Level, LLC.
- Producer: DJ Paul; Juicy J

Three 6 Mafia chronology
Underground Vol. 1: 1991-1994 (1999)	Underground Vol. 2: Club Memphis (1999)	When the Smoke Clears: Sixty 6, Sixty 1 (2000)

Professional ratings
Review scores
Source	Rating
AllMusic	2/5 stars

Underground Vol. 2: Club Memphis is a compilation album by Three 6 Mafia. Like its predecessor, Underground Vol. 1: 1991–1994, this is a collection of Three 6 Mafia's greatest underground hits. The album charted on the US Top R&B/Hip-Hop Albums (Billboard) for five weeks, peaking at #66 on September 11, 1999.

== Track listing ==
- All tracks produced by DJ Paul and Juicy J.
1. "Y'all Ready For This" - Lord Infamous
2. "Half on a Sack or Blow" - Lil' E (a.k.a. Mac E)
3. "Suck a Nigga Dick (Pt. II)" - Juicy J & Gangsta Boo
4. "Lick My Nutts" - Lord Infamous
5. "Funky Town" - Three 6 Mafia
6. "Fuck Dat Nigga" - DJ Paul ft. Project Pat
7. "Blow A Nigga Ass Off (Pt. II) - S.O.G. (featuring Lil Glock)
8. "Liquor & Dat Bud" - Three 6 Mafia
9. "Fuck Dat Shit" - Juicy J
10. "Beat Down" - Lord Infamous
11. "Droppin' Dat Dirt" - Devin Steel
12. "No I'm Not Dat Nigga" - Juicy J
13. "Nine To Yo Dome" - Project Pat
14. "South Memphis Representin'" - Michael "Boogaloo" Boyd
15. "Get Buck Mutha Fucka (Original)" - Juicy J
16. "Long & Hard (Original)" - DJ Paul & Lord Infamous
17. "Tear Da Club Up (Original)" - DJ Paul & Lord Infamous
18. "North Memphis Area" - DJ Paul & Juicy J
19. "Slob on My Cat" - Juicy J & Gangsta Boo

== Charts ==
Chart (1999)	Peak position
US Top R&B/Hip-Hop Albums (Billboard)	66
