= Tear da Club Up =

Single by Three 6 Mafia

Single by Three 6 Mafia

from the album Mystic Stylez
- Released: 1995
- Genre: Hip-hop
- Length: 3:45
- Label: Hypnotize Minds; Relativity
- Songwriters: Paul Beauregard; Ricky Dunigan; Jordan Houston III
- Producers: DJ Paul; Juicy J

Three 6 Mafia singles chronology
| "Tear da Club Up" (1995) | "Hit a Muthafucka" (1997) |

Music video
- "Tear da Club Up '97" on YouTube

"Tear da Club Up" is a song by American hip-hop group Three 6 Mafia. It was released as the lead single from their debut studio album Mystic Stylez (1995) and was produced by members DJ Paul and Juicy J. A remix of the song titled "Tear da Club Up '97" was featured on the group's third studio album Chapter 2: World Domination (1997).

== Background and composition ==
First released in 1995, the original version of the song sampled "Nadia's Theme", well-known as the theme song of the television soap opera The Young and the Restless. It became a minor hit for the group. "Tear da Club Up" has been considered the beginning of Three 6 Mafia's shift from horrorcore to more aggressive music for clubs, as well as a precursor to the rise of crunk music in the mainstream during the early 2000s.

The song was later reworked into "Tear da Club Up '97", which replaced the "Nadia's Theme" sample with that of "Theme from S.W.A.T." (from the 1975 TV series S.W.A.T.), and also featured vocals from every member of Three 6 Mafia. This remix served as the lead single from the group's second album Chapter 2: World Domination.

== Critical reception ==
Pitchfork ranked the song at number 150 on their "250 Greatest Songs of the 1990s" list.

== Controversy ==
The song was notably banned from nightclubs in the South for inciting fan riots.

== Charts ==
| Chart (1998) | Peak position |
|---|---|
| US Hot R&B/Hip-Hop Songs (Billboard) | 70 |
