= CrazyNDaLazDayz =

Studio album by Tear da Club Up Thugs of Three 6 Mafia
- Released: February 2, 1999
- Recorded: 1998–99
- Studios: Cotton Row and Hypnotize Minds (Memphis)
- Genres: Southern hip-hop, dirty rap, crunk, Horrorcore
- Length: 74:09
- Labels: Hypnotize Minds; Relativity
- Producers: DJ Paul; Juicy J; Mannie Fresh

Three 6 Mafia chronology
Chapter 2: World Domination (1997)	CrazyNDaLazDayz (1999)	Underground Vol. 1: 1991–1994 (1999)

Singles from CrazyNDaLazDayz
- 1. "Push 'Em Off" Released: 1999; 2. "Hypnotize Cash Money" Released: 1999

Professional ratings
Review scores
Source	Rating
AllMusic	3/5 stars
Entertainment Weekly	B−

CrazyNDaLazDayz is the only studio album by American hip-hop trio Tear da Club Up Thugs, composed of DJ Paul, Lord Infamous and Juicy J from Three 6 Mafia. It was released on February 2, 1999, via Relativity and DJ Paul & Juicy J's Hypnotize Minds. Recording sessions took place at Cotton Row Recording Studio and Hypnotize Minds Studio in Memphis, Tennessee. It features guest appearances from the Hot Boys, the Big Tymers, Crucial Conflict, Hussein Fatal, Spice 1, The Kaze, Too $hort and Twista. The album spawned two singles: "Push 'Em Off" and "Hypnotize Cash Money". The latter peaked at #74 on the Hot R&B/Hip-Hop Songs chart and at #64 on the R&B/Hip-Hop Airplay chart in the United States.

The album reached number 18 on the Billboard 200 albums chart and number 4 on the Top R&B/Hip-Hop Albums chart in the United States. It was certified gold by the Recording Industry Association of America on January 13, 2004.

== Track listing ==
All music is composed by DJ Paul and Juicy J, except track 14 co-produced with Mannie Fresh.

No.	Title	Length
1.	"DaLazDayz"	1:04
2.	"Who the Crunkest" (featuring Project Pat)	5:12
3.	"Smoked Out" (featuring Twista)	3:58
4.	"I'm Losing It" (performed by Lord Infamous)	2:05
5.	"Throw Your Sets" (featuring Crucial Conflict)	4:54
6.	"Undercover Freaks" (featuring Too $hort & T-Rock)	3:21
7.	"Wet Party" (featuring Spice 1 & M-Child)	3:54
8.	"Elbow a Nigga" (featuring Project Pat)	3:26
9.	"Hell Naw"	3:39
10.	"Get Buck, Get Wild" (featuring Crunchy Black)	4:17
11.	"On da Block"	0:31
12.	"What You Lookin' For" (featuring Project Pat)	3:20
13.	"Paper Chase" (featuring Hussein Fatal)	3:10
14.	"Hypnotize Cash Money" (featuring B.G., Juvenile, Birdman, Lil' Wayne & Turk)	4:23
15.	"When God Calls Time Out" (performed by Lord Infamous)	2:02
16.	"Big Business"	3:55
17.	"When It's on It's Murder"	0:30
18.	"Push 'Em Off"	4:30
19.	"Slob on My Knob"	1:59
20.	"All Dirty Hoes" (featuring Gangsta Boo)	3:21
21.	"Triple Six Clubhouse" (performed by Lord Infamous)	2:44
22.	"A Niggas Worst Downfall"	3:29
23.	"Hypnotize Minds/Profit Posse" (featuring Koopsta Knicca, Crunchy Black, M.C. Mack, ScanMan & Project Pat)	3:57
24.	"Comin' Up Next"	0:28
Total length:		74:09

== Personnel ==
- Paul Duane Beauregard – main artist, producer, executive producer
- Jordan Michael Houston – main artist, producer, executive producer
- Ricky Dunigan – main artist
- Niko Lyras – mixing & recording
- Steve Moller – mixing & recording
- Lil' Pat – mixing & recording (track 2)
- Chris Gehringer – mastering
- Pen & Pixel – artwork & design

== Charts ==
=== Weekly charts ===
Chart (1999)	Peak position
US Billboard 200	18
US Top R&B/Hip-Hop Albums (Billboard)	4

=== Year-end charts ===
Chart (1999)	Position
US Top R&B/Hip-Hop Albums (Billboard)	66

== Certifications ==
Region	Certification	Certified units/sales
United States (RIAA)	Gold	500,000^{^}
^{^} Shipments figures based on certification alone.
