= Hear Sum Evil =

Mixtape by Three 6 Mafia
- Released: October 30, 2014
- Recorded: 2013–2014
- Genres: Horrorcore, gangsta rap, hardcore hip-hop, trap
- Length: 42:30
- Label: Scale-A-Ton Entertainment
- Producers: DJ Paul, TWhy, 808 Mafia, J-Grxxn, The Outvaderz

Three 6 Mafia chronology
Reindeer Games w/ Insane Clown Posse (2014)	Hear Sum Evil (2014)	Watch What U Wish... (2015)

Singles from Hear Sum Evil
- 1. "Lock'm N Da Trunk V.2 (featuring DJ Zirk)" Released: July 11, 2014; 2. "Payin' Top Dolla (featuring Fiend & La Chat)" Released: October 13, 2014; 3. "Hear Sum Evil Intro" Released: November 25, 2014; 4. "Hydrocodone (featuring Charlie P)" Released: January 29, 2015

Hear Sum Evil is the second official mixtape by American hip-hop group Three 6 Mafia, released on October 30, 2014. Lord Infamous posthumously appears on three tracks on the mixtape with additional guest appearances from former No Limit Records artist Fiend, MJG, Paul Wall, La Chat, Lil Wyte, DJ Zirk, YB The Rich Rocka, Locodunit, and Charlie P.

== Background ==
The group originally planned to release their debut studio album on the release date of the mixtape however, DJ Paul stated that they pushed the album back to promote it more. DJ Paul decided to release the mixtape instead to serve as a substitution and to uphold his promise to fans of new music.

The three tracks featuring Lord Infamous were noted as "with Lord Infamous" on the album to distinguish to fans the tracks that included the late artist.

DJ Paul released the official audio of "Lock'm N Da Trunk" featuring DJ Zirk on July 11, 2014, followed by the official audio of "Payin' Top Dolla" featuring Fiend and La Chat on October 13, 2014.

== Track list ==
No.	Title	Producer(s)	Length
1.	"Hear Sum Evil Intro"	DJ Paul	2:51
2.	"Who Want Sum Conflict" (featuring La Chat, YB The Rich Rocka & Locodunit)	DJ Paul, TWhy, 808 Mafia	4:15
3.	"Lock'm N Da Trunk" (featuring DJ Zirk)	DJ Paul	4:44
4.	"Too Petty" (featuring Fiend, La Chat & Lil Wyte)	DJ Paul, TWhy, J-Grxxn	4:56
5.	"Skit"		0:17
6.	"Think I Don't Know" (featuring La Chat)	DJ Paul	4:06
7.	"Hydrocodone (with Lord Infamous)" (featuring Paul Wall & Charlie P)	DJ Paul, TWhy, J-Grxxn	5:28
8.	"Active (with Lord Infamous)" (featuring Fiend & La Chat)	DJ Paul, TWhy	4:56
9.	"Skit 2"		0:22
10.	"Liquor N Drugs (with Lord Infamous)" (featuring MJG)	DJ Paul	5:43
11.	"Payin' Top Dolla" (featuring Fiend & La Chat)	DJ Paul, TWhy, The Outvaderz	3:36
12.	"Outro"		1:16
Total length:			42:30

== Music videos ==
The official music video for "Lock'm N Da Trunk" was released on October 28, 2014.

The official music video for "Hear Sum Evil Intro" was released on November 25, 2014.

The official music video for "Hydrocodone" was released on January 29, 2015. Paul Wall and Crunchy Black's verses were cut for unknown reasons.
