= Live by Yo Rep =

Live by Yo Rep (B.O.N.E. Dis)

EP by Three 6 Mafia
- Released: November 21, 1995
- Genre: Southern hip-hop; Memphis rap; horrorcore; hardcore hip-hop; gangsta rap
- Length: 28:30
- Label: Prophet
- Producer: DJ Paul; Juicy J

Three 6 Mafia chronology
Mystic Stylez (1995)	Live by Yo Rep (B.O.N.E. Dis) (1995)	Chapter 1: The End (1996)

Professional ratings
Review scores
Source	Rating
AllMusic	2/5 stars

Live by Yo Rep (B.O.N.E. Dis) is the debut EP by American hip-hop group Three 6 Mafia, followed by their previous debut studio album Mystic Stylez. It was released on November 21, 1995 through Prophet. The title track is a diss song directed at Bone Thugs-n-Harmony propelled by the at-the-time beef between the two groups.

== Track listing ==
1. "A New Nightmare" – 1:10
2. "Triple 6 Mafia" – 1:45
3. "Throw Yo Setts in da Air" – 5:22
4. "Slippin" (performed by Koopsta Knicca) – 1:58
5. "Be a Witness" (performed by Killa Klan Kaze) – 5:03
6. "Live by Yo Rep" [Radio Edit] – 4:19
7. "Live by Yo Rep" [Screwed] – 4:20
8. "Tear da Club Up" [Da Real] – 4:33
