= Da Unbreakables =

Studio album by Three 6 Mafia
- Released: June 24, 2003
- Recorded: 2002–2003
- Studio: Hypnotize Minds Studio (Memphis, TN)
- Genres: Southern hip-hop; gangsta rap; hardcore hip-hop; crunk
- Length: 70:04
- Labels: Hypnotize Minds; Columbia
- Producers: DJ Paul; Juicy J; David Banner

Three 6 Mafia chronology
Choices: The Album (2001)	Da Unbreakables (2003)	Choices II: The Setup (2005)

Singles from Da Unbreakables
- 1. "Ridin' Spinners" Released: June 2003

Professional ratings
Review scores
Source	Rating
AllMusic	3/5 stars
RapReviews	5/10
Rolling Stone	2/5 stars

Da Unbreakables is the sixth studio album by American hip-hop group Three 6 Mafia. It was released on June 24, 2003, via Hypnotize Minds and Columbia Records. Produced by members DJ Paul and Juicy J, it features guest appearances from Lil' Flip, Lil Wyte, Project Pat, Frayser Boy, Josey Scott and Pimp C. Former Three 6 Mafia members Gangsta Boo and Koopsta Knicca were not present on the album, as they had both left to pursue solo careers.

In the United States, the album peaked at number four on the Billboard 200 and number two on the Top R&B/Hip-Hop Albums charts. On September 21, 2004, it was certified Gold by the Recording Industry Association of America for selling 500,000 copies in the US alone.

== Track listing ==
- All tracks produced by Juicy J and DJ Paul except track 12, co-produced with David Banner

No.	Title	Writer(s)	Length
1.	"They Bout to Find Yo Body"	Paul Beauregard; Jordan Houston; Ricky Dunigan; Darnell Carlton	1:56
2.	"Fuck That Shit"	Beauregard; J. Houston; Dunigan; Carlton	4:01
3.	"Wolf Wolf"	Beauregard; J. Houston; Dunigan	3:44
4.	"Testin My Gangsta"	Beauregard; J. Houston; Dunigan; Carlton; Willie Hutch	4:33
5.	"Bin Laden"	Beauregard; J. Houston; Dunigan; Carlton	5:01
6.	"Ridin' Spinners" (featuring Lil' Flip)	Beauregard; J. Houston; Dunigan; Carlton; Eric Wright; Lorenzo Patterson; Andre Young; George Clinton; William Earl Collins; George Bernard Worrell; Abrim Tilmon	4:10
7.	"Try Somethin" (featuring Project Pat)	Beauregard; J. Houston; Dunigan; Carlton; Patrick Houston	3:56
8.	"Money Didn't Change Me"	Beauregard; J. Houston; Dunigan	3:11
9.	"Ghetto Chick"	Beauregard; J. Houston; Dunigan; Ronald Isley; O'Kelly Isley Jr.; Rudolph Isley; Ernie Isley; Marvin Isley; Chris Jasper	3:28
10.	"Shake Dat Jelly"	Beauregard; J. Houston; Dunigan; Carlton	3:04
11.	"Let's Start a Riot"	Beauregard; J. Houston; Dunigan; Carlton	4:46
12.	"Rainbow Colors" (featuring Lil' Flip)	Beauregard; J. Houston; Wesley Weston	4:32
13.	"Like a Pimp (Remix)" (featuring Pimp C and Project Pat)	Beauregard; J. Houston; Chad Butler; P. Houston	3:53
14.	"Beatem to da Floor"	Beauregard; J. Houston; Dunigan; Carlton	2:33
15.	"Put Cha D. in Her Mouth"	Beauregard; J. Houston; Dunigan	3:18
16.	"Mosh Pit" (featuring Josey Scott and Lil Wyte)	Beauregard; J. Houston; Josey Scott; Patrick Lanshaw	3:38
17.	"You Scared Part II"	Beauregard; J. Houston; Dunigan; Carlton	4:17
18.	"Dangerous Posse" (performed by the Hypnotize Camp Posse)	Beauregard; J. Houston; Dunigan; Carlton; Cedric Coleman; Lanshaw	3:44
19.	"Outro"		2:19
Total length:			70:04

Sample credits

- Track 4 contains excerpts from "Theme from The Mack" written and performed by Willie Hutch.
- Track 6 contains excerpts from "Eazy-Duz-It" performed by Eazy-E.
- Track 9 contains excerpts from "Make Me Say It Again Girl" performed by the Isley Brothers.

== Charts ==
=== Weekly charts ===
Chart (2003)	Peak position
US Billboard 200	4
US Top R&B/Hip-Hop Albums (Billboard)	2

=== Year-end charts ===
Chart (2003)	Position
US Billboard 200	198
US Top R&B/Hip-Hop Albums (Billboard)	57

== Certifications ==
Region	Certification	Certified units/sales
United States (RIAA)	Gold	500,000^{^}
^{^} Shipments figures based on certification alone.
