= 6ix Commandments =

Mixtape by Da Mafia 6ix
- Released: November 12, 2013
- Recorded: 2013
- Genres: Horrorcore; trap; gangsta rap; hardcore hip-hop
- Length: 60:08
- Labels: Scale-A-Ton; Hypnotize Minds
- Producers: DJ Paul; TWhy Xclusive; JGRXXN; SpaceGhostPurrp; Shawty Trap

Da Mafia 6ix chronology
Last 2 Walk (2008)	6ix Commandments (2013)	Reindeer Games (2014)

Singles from 6ix Commandments
- 1. "Go Hard (featuring Yelawolf)" Released: October 8, 2013; 2. "Remember (featuring Lil Wyte)" Released: November 29, 2013; 3. "Break Da Law" Released: January 31, 2014; 4. "Beacon N Blender" Released: April 7, 2014; 5. "Been Had Hard" Released: May 28, 2014

6ix Commandments is the debut mixtape by American hip-hop group Da Mafia 6ix and hosted by Trap-A-Holics. The mixtape was released on November 12, 2013, as well as a no DJ version with two bonus tracks on iTunes and later on a physical copy on January 7, 2014. A chopped and screwed version was released on December 17, 2013.

6ix Commandments features guest appearances from Yelawolf, Lil Wyte, The Outlawz, SpaceGhostPurrp, Krayzie Bone, Bizzy Bone, 8Ball & MJG, Kokoe, Point Blank, J-Grxxn, Locodunit, Kingpin Skinny Pimp, La Chat, and surprise guest appearances from brothers Juicy J and Project Pat who were noted as "& More" on the track list.

== Background ==
DJ Paul and Lord Infamous were in the process of rebirthing the Come with Me 2 Hell series when Lord Infamous decided that it would be better to try and reunite the old Three 6 Mafia instead. Gangsta Boo, Koopsta Knicca, and Crunchy Black joined Paul and Infamous and reformed the old group under the new name Da Mafia 6ix. DJ Paul stated that he felt like it was a reunion, despite the absence of Juicy J. He thought of it rather as a whole new project, separate from Three 6 Mafia and decided to give the group a new name out of respect for Juicy J and to avoid potential complications involving the use of the Three 6 Mafia name without the approval of Juicy J and Columbia Records.

The mixtape was originally going to be called Ressurlation, which was a meshing of the words "resurrection" and "revelation", but was changed to 6ix Commandments instead. The mixtape was deemed by DJ Paul a "sampler" for the upcoming album Watch What U Wish... by Da Mafia 6ix, which was scheduled to be released in 2014.

The track "Body Parts 4" is the final posse song to include verses from all six original members of Three 6 Mafia.

== Track listing ==
No.	Title	Producer(s)	Length
1.	"6ix Commandments Intro"		0:29
2.	"Go Hard" (featuring Yelawolf)	DJ Paul	5:53
3.	"Beacon N Blender"	DJ Paul	5:09
4.	"Been Had Hard"	DJ Paul; TWhy Xclusive (co.); JGRXXN (co.)	4:49
5.	"Betta Pray" (featuring The Outlawz and Lil Wyte)	DJ Paul; TWhy Xclusive	6:10
6.	"Break Da Law"	DJ Paul	4:54
7.	"Murder On My Mind" (featuring SpaceGhostPurrp, Krayzie Bone and Bizzy Bone)	SpaceGhostPurrp; DJ Paul (co.); JGRXXN (co.)	6:09
8.	"Remember" (featuring Lil Wyte)	DJ Paul	5:28
9.	"Stash Spot"	DJ Paul	4:07
10.	"Yean High" (featuring 8Ball & MJG)	DJ Paul; TWhy Xclusive (co.); JGRXXN (co.)	5:35
11.	"Body Parts 4" (featuring Juicy J, Kingpin Skinny Pimp, Lil Wyte, La Chat, Project Pat, Locodunit, Point Blank, JGRXXN and Kokoe)	DJ Paul	9:00
12.	"6iX Commandments Outro"		2:25
Total length:			60:08

Sample credits

- "Go Hard" contains a sample of "We Do What We're Told (Milgram's 37)" by Peter Gabriel.
- "Beacon N Blender" contains a sample of "Long Red" by Mountain.
- "Betta Pray" contains a sample of "God is Dead?" by Black Sabbath, and dialogue from The Iceman.
- "Remember" contains a sample of "Fame" by Irene Cara.
- "Yean High" contains a sample of "Pimps N The House" by 8Ball & MJG.

=== NO DJ version (album) track listing ===
No.	Title	Producer(s)	Length
1.	"Go Hard" (featuring Yelawolf)	DJ Paul	5:55
2.	"Beacon N Blender"	DJ Paul	4:56
3.	"Been Had Hard"	DJ Paul, TWhy, (co-producer) J-Grxxn	4:53
4.	"Betta Pray" (featuring The Outlawz & Lil Wyte)	DJ Paul, TWhy	6:16
5.	"Break Da Law"	DJ Paul	4:56
6.	"Murder On My Mind" (featuring SpaceGhostPurrp, Krayzie Bone, & Bizzy Bone)	Space Ghost Purrp, (Co-Producers) DJ Paul, J-Grxxn	6:02
7.	"Remember" (featuring Lil Wyte)	DJ Paul	5:30
8.	"Stash Spot"	DJ Paul	4:12
9.	"Yean High" (featuring 8Ball & MJG)	DJ Paul, TWhy, (co-producer) J-Grxxn	5:38
10.	"Body Parts 4" (featuring Juicy J, Kingpin Skinny Pimp, Lil Wyte, La Chat, Project Pat, Locodunit, Point Blank, JGrxxn & Kokoe)	DJ Paul	9:00
11.	"6iX Commandments Outro"		2:21
12.	"Grab Da Gauge"	DJ Paul, TWhy	3:57
13.	"How We Gone Play It"	DJ Paul, J-Grxxn, Shawty Trap	3:26
Total length:			67:02

=== Chopped Up, Tripped Out, Skrewed version track listing ===
No.	Title	Producer(s)	Length
1.	"Intro"		0:29
2.	"Go Hard" (featuring Yelawolf)	DJ Paul	7:39
3.	"Break Da Law"	DJ Paul	5:02
4.	"How We Gone Play It"	DJ Paul, J-Grxxn, Shawty Trap	4:32
5.	"Remember" (featuring Lil Wyte)	DJ Paul	6:36
6.	"Been Had Hard"	DJ Paul, TWhy, (co-producer) J-Grxxn	6:10
7.	"Beacon N Blender"	DJ Paul	6:10
8.	"Betta Pray" (featuring The Outlawz & Lil Wyte)	DJ Paul, TWhy	7:33
9.	"Stash Spot"	DJ Paul	4:46
10.	"Yean High" (featuring 8Ball & MJG)	DJ Paul, TWhy, (co-producer) J-Grxxn	6:33
11.	"Grab Da Gauge"	DJ Paul, TWhy	4:29
12.	"Murder On My Mind" (featuring SpaceGhostPurrp, Krayzie Bone, & Bizzy Bone)	Space Ghost Purrp, (Co-Producers) DJ Paul, J-Grxxn	7:18
13.	"Body Parts 4" (featuring Juicy J, Kingpin Skinny Pimp, Lil Wyte, La Chat, Project Pat, Locodunit, Point Blank, JGrxxn & Kokoe)	DJ Paul	12:03
14.	"Outro"		2:49
Total length:			82:09

== Videos ==
Two introduction videos, three music videos, and five vlogs were released to promote the project as well as an additional video for promotion of the group that was of a classic song from the collective that was not a part of the project. The videos released are as follows:

=== Introduction videos ===
- "Introducing: Da Mafia 6ix" - July 9, 2013
- "Da Mafia 6ix TBAWW Trailer 2013" - September 25, 2013

=== Official music videos ===
- "Go Hard" (featuring Yelawolf) - October 8, 2013
- "Remember" (featuring Lil Wyte) - November 29, 2013
- "Where Is Da Bud" (Promotional Video) - December 6, 2013
- "Break Da Law" - January 31, 2014
- "Beacon N Blender" - April 7, 2014
- "Been Had Hard" - May 28, 2014

In response to fans on Twitter, DJ Paul stated that there would be music videos to "Betta Pray" and "Body Parts" but these videos never released.
*Been Had Hard cuts Gangsta Boo's verse off due to her departure.

=== Vlogs ===
- "Da Mafia 6ix Vlo6 #1: Yelawolf Talks Three 6 Mafia Influence, Go Hard and More! Exclusive!" - October 15, 2013
- "Da Mafia 6ix Vlo6 #2: DJ Paul x Gangsta Boo NYC Takeover!" - November 4, 2013
- "Da Mafia 6ix Vlo6 #3: The Bee Gees and Random Strangers?! NYC Pt 2" - November 12, 2013
- "Da Mafia 6ix Vlo6 #4: Lil Wyte Joins Da Mafia 6ix for "Remember"" - November 19, 2013
- "Da Mafia 6ix Vlo6 #5: Crunchy Black & Koopsta Knicca Turn Up in Knoxville!" - January 5, 2014

== Tour ==
In 2014, the group announced that it would be going on "Da Triple Six Sinners" tour in promotion of the mixtape and upcoming album. Twisted Insane was announced as a guest on the tour with the collective on all of the dates with the exception of two. The following dates were confirmed on DJ Paul's website:

Date	Venue	Location
February 28	New Daisy Theatre	Memphis, TN
* March 1	The Warehouse	Clarksville, TN
* March 2	Diamonds Pub	Louisville, KY
* March 3	Mojoe's	Joliet, IL
* March 5	The Intersection	Grand Rapids, MI
* March 6	Mainstreet	Toledo, OH
* March 7	The Chameleon	Lancaster, PA
* March 8	Al Rosa Villa	Columbus, OH
* March 9	Wescott Theater	Syracuse, NY
* March 10	Iris / Maple Ent. Complex	Buffalo, NY
* March 12	Centerstage	Kokomo, IN
* March 15	Harpo's	Detroit, MI
* March 16	Agora Theater	Cleveland, OH
* March 17	Stafford Palace	Stafford Springs, CT
* March 18	Webster Hall	New York, NY
* March 20	Alabama Music Box	Mobile, AL
* March 21	Iron Horse	Birmingham, AL
* March 22	Good Time Charlie's	Tupelo, MS
* March 23	The Hangar	New Orleans, LA
March 27	The Mad Magician	St. Louis, MO
* March 29	Gio's	Fargo, ND
* March 30	Bubba's	Sauk Rapids, MN
* March 31	Amsterdam Bar & Hall	St. Paul, MN
* April 1	RC McGraw's	Manhattan, KS
* April 2	Sunshine Studios	Colorado Springs, CO
* April 3	The Muse Ballroom	Salina, KS
* April 4	The Roxy	Denver, CO
* April 5	Hodi's Half Note	Fort Collins, CO
* April 6	Belly Up	Aspen, CO
* April 9	Joe's Grotto	Phoenix, AZ
* April 11	The Sky Box	Las Vegas, NV
* April 12	Industry Theater	Lancaster, CA
* April 16	Knitting Factory	Reno, NV
* April 18	Studio Seven	Seattle, WA
* April 20	The Grange Hall	Albany, OR
* April 22	Knitting Factory	Boise, ID
* April 24	Knitting Factory	Spokane, WA
* April 26	Lofi Cafe	Salt Lake City, UT
* denotes tour dates that includes Twisted Insane.

== Charts ==
Chart (2013)	Peak position
US Billboard Heatseekers Albums	5
US Top R&B/Hip-Hop Albums (Billboard)	34
