= Slob on My Knob =

1993 song by Juicy J

Song by Juicy J

from the album Volume 6 and CrazyNDaLazDayz
- Released: 1993 (original); 1999 (cover)
- Recorded: 1993
- Genre: Southern hip-hop; dirty rap; crunk
- Length: 4:18
- Label: Hypnotize Minds
- Songwriter: Jordan Michael Houston III

"Slob on My Knob" (also titled "Slob on My Nob") is a song by American rapper Juicy J. Originally written while Juicy J was in the 11th grade, the song was first recorded using a simple home setup and was inspired by DJ Squeeky's "Lookin' for da Chewin'". It gained underground popularity and was later re-recorded for the 1999 album CrazyNDaLazDayz by Tear Da Club Up Thugs, a group that included Juicy J. Over the years, it has been sampled and referenced by artists such as ASAP Ferg, G-Eazy, Future, GloRilla, and Sexyy Red.

== Background and recording ==
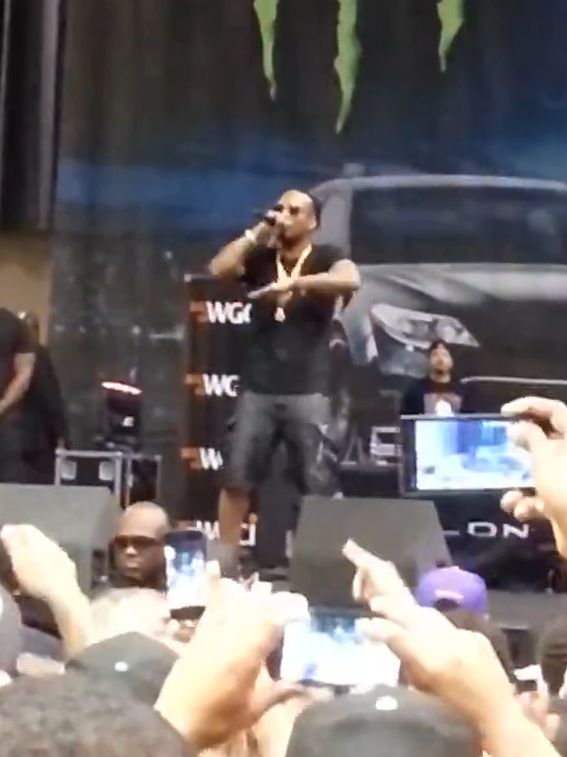
Juicy J performing "Slob on My Knob" at the 2013 Chicago Auto Show.

"Slob on My Knob" was written by Juicy J while he was in the 11th grade at Northside High School in Memphis, Tennessee. He later said he did not take the song seriously at the time, explaining that he was "just bullshitting with it" and writing about things he saw in his neighborhood. He wrote the opening lines and first verse during a history class and completed the second verse the next day, keeping the lyrics in his history book. The song was recorded at his mother's house with his brother, Project Pat, using a 4-track recorder purchased from his art teacher, a cheap microphone, and headphones. The song was inspired by DJ Squeeky's "Lookin' for da Chewin'", and it samples the beat produced for that track. At a club where he worked as a DJ, people asked him to play the song many times.

== Covers and other versions ==
The song was interpolated by Juicy J in his verse on Three 6 Mafia's track "Watcha Do". A full cover version later appeared on the 1999 album CrazyNDaLazDayz by Tear Da Club Up Thugs, a group that also included Juicy J. DJ Paul, another member of the group, acknowledged that the song was catchy, but there were few options for promoting it alongside the album at the time. However, a clean version was played on some Memphis radio stations. In 2022, Juicy J performed the song at the BET Hip Hop Awards, but BET cut the broadcast during his performance. Later on Twitter, Juicy J said he didn't blame them for doing it because it was "a filthy song". In September 2024, Juicy J released a deluxe version of his album Ravenite Social Club, which included a jazz version of "Slob on My Knob", as well as a jazz cover of his 2012 song "Bandz a Make Her Dance".

== Legacy ==
The song is now seen as an "iconic classic", with the website Hip Hop My Way saying its style and influence can still be found in hip hop today, as it is linked to three songs that reached the Billboard Hot 100 chart. On June 13, 2017, ASAP Ferg released the song "Plain Jane", which was strongly inspired by a 1999 version of "Slob on My Knob". ASAP Ferg said the song was very important to him and that Juicy J, who was part of the original song, was one of the first people to take him on tour. On September 8, 2017, G-Eazy released the song "No Limit" featuring ASAP Rocky and Cardi B, which interpolated the song. Days later, "Slob on My Knob" trended on Apple Music, and fans showed their excitement on Twitter. On January 11, 2018, part of the song was used by rapper Future in the track "King's Dead", which also has Jay Rock, Kendrick Lamar, and James Blake. In 2021, rapper Sexyy Red released the song "Slob On My Ckat", which used parts of the original song and paid tribute to it. In 2023, rapper GloRilla released the song "Lick or Sum", which used both a sample and parts of the lyrics from "Slob on My Knob".

According to Juicy J, it was Mac Miller’s favorite song and helped them become friends because Miller asked to perform a live version of it when he was seventeen. In March 2020, after Gal Gadot shared a video of celebrities singing "Imagine", comedian Zack Fox made a parody video where he and others performed "Slob on My Knob". People in the video included Eric André, Thundercat, 6lack, Quinta Brunson, Langston Kerman, and Chuck Inglish, among others. In August 2020, rapper Megan Thee Stallion mentioned the song to highlight the unfair criticism she and Cardi B received for their collaboration "WAP". The song was featured in the first episode of the 2019 comedy series Pen15, where it is sung by actress Maya Erskine.
