= Choices: The Album =

Studio album by Three 6 Mafia
- Released: August 28, 2001
- Recorded: 2000–2001
- Genres: Crunk; gangsta rap; hardcore hip-hop
- Length: 71:47
- Labels: Hypnotize Minds; Loud; Columbia
- Producers: DJ Paul; Juicy J

Three 6 Mafia chronology
Underground Vol. 3: Kings of Memphis (2000)	Choices: The Album (2001)	Da Unbreakables (2003)

Singles from Choices: The Album
- 1. "Baby Mama" Released: September 9, 2001; 2. "2 Way Freak" Released: December 11, 2001

Professional ratings
Review scores
Source	Rating
AllMusic	2.5/5 stars
RapReviews	(6.5/10)

Choices: The Album is the fifth studio album by American hip-hop group Three 6 Mafia. It was released as the soundtrack for the direct-to-video movie Choices: The Movie. The album was released on August 28, 2001, by Hypnotize Minds, Loud Records and Columbia Records. The song "They Don't Fuck Wit U" is featured on the soundtrack for Exit Wounds. This is the final album by Three 6 Mafia to feature Koopsta Knicca and Gangsta Boo.

== Track listing ==
- All tracks are produced by DJ Paul and Juicy J

No.	Title	Length
1.	"2-Way Freak" (DJ Paul, Juicy J & La Chat)	4:57
2.	"The Restaurant Scene (Skit)"	0:40
3.	"Mafia" (DJ Paul, Juicy J, Lord Infamous, Crunchy Black, Gangsta Boo, Project Pat & La Chat)	5:20
4.	"Baby Mama" (DJ Paul, Juicy J & La Chat)	4:43
5.	"Gangsta Niggaz" (DJ Paul, Juicy J & Gangsta Boo)	4:33
6.	"Wona Get Some, I Got Some" (DJ Paul, Juicy J, Lord Infamous & T-Rock)	4:27
7.	"1st Crime Scene (Skit)"	0:40
8.	"O.V." (Lord Infamous)	4:13
9.	"U Got Da Game Wrong" (DJ Paul, Juicy J & La Chat)	3:40
10.	"We Shootin' 1st" (DJ Paul, Gangsta Boo, Crunchy Black & Lord Infamous)	4:44
11.	"Dis Bitch, Dat Hoe" (Project Pat, Ludacris & Crunchy Black)	4:22
12.	"Pass Me" (Crunchy Black & La Chat)	3:39
13.	"Big Pat's Warehouse (Skit)"	0:31
14.	"They Don't Fuck Wit U" (DJ Paul, Juicy J, Lord Infamous, Crunchy Black, Koopsta Knicca & Project Pat)	4:04
15.	"Slang & Serve" (T-Rock & Juicy J)	4:18
16.	"War wit Us" (DJ Paul, Juicy J, Crunchy Black & La Chat)	3:46
17.	"Mean Mug" (DJ Paul, Juicy J, Gangsta Boo & La Chat)	4:49
18.	"How It Went Down (Skit)"	0:22
19.	"I Ain't Goin' (A Hustler's Theme)" (Namond Lumpkin & Juicy J)	4:08
20.	"Ridin' On Chrome" (Project Pat)	2:59
21.	"Talkin'"	0:52
Total length:		71:47
