= Chapter 2: World Domination =

Studio album by Three 6 Mafia
- Released: November 4, 1997
- Recorded: 1997
- Genres: Horrorcore; gangsta rap; hardcore hip-hop
- Length: 72:56
- Labels: Hypnotize Minds; Relativity
- Producers: DJ Paul (also executive); Juicy J (also executive)

Three 6 Mafia chronology
Chapter 1: The End (1996)	Chapter 2: World Domination (1997)	CrazyNDaLazDayz (1999)

Audio sample
- "Late Nite Tip": file; help

Professional ratings
Review scores
Source	Rating
AllMusic	4/5 stars

Chapter 2: World Domination is the third studio album by American hip-hop group Three 6 Mafia. The album was released on November 4, 1997, by Hypnotize Minds and Relativity Records. This was their first widely distributed album and also Three 6 Mafia's first Gold-RIAA certified album, having sold over 800,000 copies in the US. This album is the last to feature a majority of darker beats and also shows the group moving toward a more mainstream sound that would be heard on their 2000 album, When the Smoke Clears: Sixty 6, Sixty 1. It incorporated reprises of four hits previously released on Mystic Stylez and Chapter 1: The End —"Late Nite Tip", "N 2 Deep", "Body Parts", and "Tear Da Club Up".

== Track listing ==
- All tracks are produced by DJ Paul and Juicy J additional production by 2000 Watts Music

No.	Title	Lyrics	Length
1.	"We Are Waiting" (Skit)		1:04
2.	"Studio Time" (Skit)		0:15
3.	"Will Blast"	DJ Paul; Gangsta Boo; Juicy J; Crunchy Black; Lord Infamous; Koopsta Knicca	1:30
4.	"Hit a Muthafucka"	Juicy J; Lord Infamous; DJ Paul; Crunchy Black; Gangsta Boo; Koopsta Knicca	3:58
5.	"Are You Ready 4 Us" (featuring The Dayton Family)	Lord Infamous; Juicy J; Dayton Family; DJ Paul; Gangsta Boo; Crunchy Black; Koopsta Knicca	4:51
6.	"Prophet Posse" (featuring Prophet Posse)	Lord Infamous; Gangsta Boo; Scan Man; DJ Paul; Juicy J; Crunchy Black; Indo G; K-Rock; Project Pat	4:13
7.	"Motivated"	Juicy J; DJ Paul; Gangsta Boo; Lord Infamous	3:42
8.	"I Ain't Cha Friend"	Koopsta Knicca; Gangsta Boo; Crunchy Black; DJ Paul; Lord Infamous	4:58
9.	"Watcha Do"	Lord Infamous; Gangsta Boo; Juicy J; DJ Paul; Crunchy Black; DJ Spanish Fly; Koopsta Knicca	3:30
10.	"Spill My Blood"	Lord Infamous; DJ Paul; Crunchy Black; Gangsta Boo; Juicy J	3:59
11.	"Who Got Dem 9's" (featuring Project Pat)	Juicy J; Project Pat	3:10
12.	"Gunclaps"	Juicy J; Lord Infamous; Crunchy Black; DJ Paul	3:15
13.	"3-6 In the Morning"	Lord Infamous	2:51
14.	"Tear Da Club Up '97"	DJ Paul; Lord Infamous; Juicy J; Gangsta Boo; Crunchy Black; Koopsta Knicca	3:45
15.	"Late Nite Tip"	Lord Infamous; Gangsta Boo; DJ Paul; Juicy J; Koopsta Knicca	4:46
16.	"Bodyparts 2" (featuring Prophet Posse)	DJ Paul; Lord Infamous; Gangsta Boo; M-Child; Juicy J; Scan Man; Droopy Drew Dog; Crunchy Black; Project Pat; Indo G; K-Rock	4:18
17.	"Flashes"	DJ Paul; Gangsta Boo; Juicy J; Koopsta Knicca	2:44
18.	"Neighborhood Hoe"	DJ Paul	1:55
19.	"N 2 Deep"	Lord Infamous; Koopsta Knicca; Gangsta Boo; Juicy J; DJ Paul	3:59
20.	"Anyone Out There"	Lord Infamous	3:12
21.	"Land of the Lost" (featuring Project Pat)	Project Pat; Gangsta Boo; DJ Paul; Juicy J; Koopsta Knicca; Crunchy Black	3:55
22.	"Weed Is Got Me High"	DJ Paul; Juicy J; Crunchy Black; Gangsta Boo; Lord Infamous; Koopsta Knicca	3:06
Total length:			72:56

== Charts ==
Chart (1997)	Peak position
US Billboard 200	40
US Top R&B/Hip-Hop Albums (Billboard)	18

== Certifications ==
Region	Certification	Certified units/sales
United States (RIAA)	Gold	500,000^{^}
^{^} Shipments figures based on certification alone.
