= Underground Vol. 1: 1991–1994 =

Compilation album by Three 6 Mafia
- Released: March 2, 1999
- Recorded: 1991–1994
- Genre: Memphis rap
- Length: 62:20
- Label: Smoked Out, Street Level
- Producer: DJ Paul; Juicy J

Three 6 Mafia chronology
CrazyNDaLazDayz (1999)	Underground Vol. 1: 1991–1994 (1999)	Underground Vol. 2: Club Memphis (1999)

Professional ratings
Review scores
Source	Rating
AllMusic	2.5/5 stars
Pitchfork	9.0/10

Underground Vol. 1: 1991–1994 is a collection of songs recorded when Three 6 Mafia first started their rap career. These songs have been taken from their underground mixtapes and albums such as DJ Paul & Juicy J's Vol. 1–3 mixtapes, DJ Paul & Lord Infamous' mixtapes, Juicy J's mixtapes, and the Triple Six Mafia's Smoked Out Loced Out mixtape.

== Track listing ==
- All tracks produced by DJ Paul and Juicy J.
1. "Ridin' 'N' "Tha" Chevy Pt. 2 – DJ Paul & Lord Infamous feat. Juicy J
2. "Niggaz Ain't Barin Dat – Triple Six Mafia
3. "Chargin' These Hoes – DJ Paul & Juicy J
4. "Now I'm High, Really High (original version)" – Triple Six Mafia
5. "Sucks On Dick (original version)" – Juicy J
6. "Playa Hataz (original version)" – Triple Six Mafia
7. "Paul With Da 45" – DJ Paul & Lord Infamous
8. "Where Da Bud At" (Officially "Stop") – Lord Infamous
9. "Mask and Da Glock" (Officially "Victim Of a Driveby") – Lil' Glock & S.O.G.
10. "Don't Be Scared – Juicy J
11. "Time For Da Juice Mane" (Officially "Stomp") – Juicy J
12. "Walk Up To Your House – DJ Paul & Juicy J
13. "Yeah, They Done Fucked Up – DJ Paul
14. "Talk Ya Ass Off" – DJ Paul
15. "Fuck All Dem Hoes" – DJ Paul & Juicy J
