= Choices II: The Setup =

Studio album by Three 6 Mafia
- Released: March 29, 2005
- Recorded: 2004–2005
- Studio: Hypnotize Minds Studio (Memphis, TN)
- Genre: Hip-hop
- Length: 68:29
- Labels: Hypnotize Minds; Columbia; Sony Urban
- Producers: DJ Paul; Juicy J; Lil Jon

Three 6 Mafia chronology
Da Unbreakables (2003)	Choices II: The Setup (2005)	Most Known Unknown (2005)

Professional ratings
Review scores
Source	Rating
AllMusic	3/5 stars
RapReviews	4.5/10

Choices II: The Setup is the seventh studio album by American hip-hop group Three 6 Mafia. It was released on March 29, 2005, via Hypnotize Minds, Sony Urban Music and Columbia Records, serving as a soundtrack for the direct-to-video movie Choices II: The Setup. Recording sessions took place at Hypnotize Minds Studio in Memphis. Produced by members DJ Paul and Juicy J, it features contributions from fellow Hypnotize Camp Posse cohorts Lil Wyte and Frayser Boy, as well as D-Roc, The Last Mr. Bigg, Trillville and YoungBloodZ.

== Track listing ==
- All tracks produced by Juicy J and DJ Paul, except track 6, co-produced with Lil Jon

No.	Title	Length
1.	"Intro"	1:06
2.	"Who da Fuck You Playin' Wit?"	4:48
3.	"Yeah I Rob" (featuring The Last Mr. Bigg)	4:42
4.	"P.I.M.P."	4:44
5.	"Skit 1"	0:56
6.	"It's Whateva Wit Us" (featuring YoungBloodZ and D-Roc)	5:41
7.	"Pass Dat Shit"	5:19
8.	"Squeeze It"	3:47
9.	"Official Crunk Junt"	4:25
10.	"Who I Is" (featuring Trillville and Lil Wyte)	4:49
11.	"Skit 2"	0:43
12.	"Shoot up da Club"	4:41
13.	"Stanky Stanky"	2:48
14.	"One Hitta Quitta"	5:05
15.	"Getting Real Buck"	2:41
16.	"I Sho Will" (Intro)	0:09
17.	"I Sho Will" (Remix)	4:42
18.	"Skit 3"	0:46
19.	"Posse Song"	3:31
20.	"Outro"	3:06
Total length:		68:29

Sample credits

- Track 8 contains samples from "My Neck, My Back (Lick It)" written by Khia Chambers, Michael Williams and Edward Meriwether as performed by Khia and Taz.

== Personnel ==
- Jordan "Juicy J" Houston – vocals, songwriter, producer, recording, mixing, programming, executive producer
- Paul "DJ Paul" Beauregard – vocals, songwriter, producer, recording, mixing, programming, executive producer
- Darnell "Crunchy Black" Carlton – vocals, songwriter
- Ricky "Lord Infamous" Dunigan – vocals, songwriter
- Patrick "Lil Wyte" Lanshaw – vocals, songwriter
- Cedric "Frayser Boy" Coleman – vocals, songwriter
- Jonathan "Lil Jon" Smith – producer, songwriter (track 6)
- Donald "Mr. Bigg" Pears – vocals, songwriter (track 3)
- Jeffrey "J-Bo" Grigsby – vocals, songwriter (track 6)
- Sean Paul Joseph – vocals, songwriter (track 6)
- D'eongelo "D-Roc" Holmes – vocals, songwriter (track 6)
- Lawrence "Lil Atlanta" Edwards – vocals, songwriter (track 10)
- Jamal "Dirty Mouth" Glaze – vocals, songwriter (track 10)
- Donnell "Don P" Prince – vocals, songwriter (track 10)
- Michael "Crazy Mike" Foster – recording, mixing, programming
- Carlos "Six July" Broady – programming
- Kurt "KC" Clayton – programming
- James Cruz – mastering
