= The Kaze =

American hip-hop group

- The Kaze in 1998 at Hypnotize Minds studio Scan Man, M.C. Mack, Project Pat

Background information
- Also known as: Killa Klan Kaze
- Origin: Memphis, Tennessee, United States
- Genres: Hip-hop; Memphis rap; horrorcore; gangsta rap; Southern hip-hop; hardcore hip-hop
- Years active: 1990–present
- Labels: Kami Kaze Productions (1992–present); Hypnotize Minds (1997–2000); Prophet Entertainment (1995–1998)
- Members: M.C. Mack; Vokillz; Kano; Da Wolf; Mac-Yo; Queen King
- Past members: Scan Man; K-Rock (deceased); Project Pat; Lil Corb (deceased); Pimp Teddy; Mac Yo; Nigaro; M-Child

The Kaze, also known as Killa Klan Kaze, is an American hip-hop group from Memphis, Tennessee. They are largely known for their affiliation with Three 6 Mafia throughout much of the 1990s, having been a featured act and members of the Prophet Posse and Hypnotize Camp Posse. The group originally consisted of M.C Mack, Scan Man and K-Rock, though Project Pat replaced K-Rock in the trio for the group's debut album, 1998's Kamakaze Timez Up, produced by DJ Paul and Juicy J.

In 2000, the group's affiliation with Three 6 Mafia ended when M.C. Mack and Scan Man had a fallout with DJ Paul and Juicy J after attempting to release music independently produced and recorded under The Kaze name, with a lengthy dispute over royalties resulting. Since that time, The Kaze has operated independently, having undergone membership growth and changes, while releasing several albums via its label, Kami Kaze Productions.

== History ==
The Kaze began their activities in the early 1990s in Memphis. In 1995, the group (then known as "Killa Klan Kaze") was featured on a tape entitled "Volume 3 Spring Mix 95", which contained the first recorded track of Killa Klan Kaze, "Runnin 'Lip". They had a track on Three 6 Mafia's 1995 EP Live by Yo Rep, titled "Be a Witness". Project Pat ultimately replaced K-Rock and in 1998 the group released their first studio album Kamakaze Timez Up and sold about 50,000 independent copies. The album was released with the production of Three 6 Mafia's Juicy J and DJ Paul. The album would be the only project released by the group together. 1998, the group's label, Prophet Entertainment shut down after label co-founders DJ Paul and Juicy J split from fellow label co-founder Nick Scarfo. The result was DJ Paul and Juicy J's creation of a new label, Hypnotize Minds. In, 1999 Scan Man and M.C. Mack founded their own Kami Kaze Inc. independent label and released Thugz From Southside: 2000 Mazdestruction.

In 2012, the group was nominated for music awards at the Memphis Music Hall of Fame and won the "Best Group" Award.

In 2020, MC Mack filed a copyright lawsuit against Three 6 Mafia, alleging that they have been using their music without permission since the 1990s. The case is pending in court in Shelby County, Tennessee.

== Discography ==
=== Studio albums ===
- Kamakazie Timez Up (1998)
- Kami Kaze (2001)
- Only the Strong Survive (2005)
- KKZ Timez Up: Part 2 (2022)

== Awards and nominations ==
Year	Awards	Category	Result
2012	Memphis Music Hall of Fame	Best Group	Won
