= Gangsta Boo =

American rapper (1979–2023)

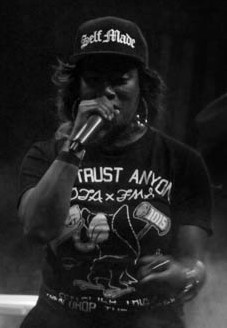
- Gangsta Boo performing in 2014

Background information
- Also known as: Lady Boo; The Devil's Daughter
- Born: Lola Chantrelle Mitchell; August 7, 1979; Memphis, Tennessee, U.S.
- Died: January 1, 2023 (aged 43) Memphis, Tennessee, U.S.
- Genres: Southern hip-hop; gangsta rap; horrorcore
- Occupation: Rapper
- Years active: 1994–2023
- Labels: Prophet; Hypnotize Minds; Drum Squad
- Formerly of: Three 6 Mafia; Prophet Posse; Hypnotize Camp Posse
- Website: gangstaboo.com

Lola Chantrelle Mitchell (August 7, 1979 – January 1, 2023), known professionally as Gangsta Boo, was an American rapper. She rose to prominence as a member of Three 6 Mafia, which she joined at the age of 14; after releasing six albums, she left the group and its record label after the release of her second solo album Both Worlds *69 (2001) due to financial disputes and issues regarding promotion of the album. She subsequently released several solo albums and became known for collaborating with artists such as Foxy Brown, La Chat, Eminem, GloRilla, Run the Jewels, Lil Jon, Latto, Outkast, Tinashe, and Yelawolf.

== Early life ==
Lola Chantrelle Mitchell was born in the Whitehaven area of Memphis, Tennessee, on August 7, 1979. She was from a middle-class family, but said that they later "moved to the hood" after her parents divorced. She started rapping at around the age of 14.

== Music career ==
=== Three 6 Mafia ===
After being discovered by DJ Paul, Gangsta Boo became a member of Three 6 Mafia, making her the sole female member of the group. She made her first appearance on DJ Paul's mixtape Volume 16: 4 Da Summer Of ’94, released in 1994. She was on the group's 1995 debut album Mystic Stylez and on four more albums until she ultimately left the group in 2001 to prioritize her solo career.

In 2013, she joined the Three 6 Mafia spin-off group Da Mafia 6ix, and was significantly featured on their debut mixtape 6ix Commandments. She departed from the group in 2014.

=== Solo work ===
Gangsta Boo's first solo album, Enquiring Minds, was released in 1998 and reached number 15 on the Billboard Top R&B/Hip-Hop Albums chart and number 46 on the Billboard 200. The album featured the surprise hit "Where Dem Dollas At!?".

Her second album, Both Worlds *69 (2001), reached number 8 on the R&B/Hip-Hop chart and number 29 on the Billboard 200. In 2003, she released her third album, Enquiring Minds II: The Soap Opera. The album peaked at number 53 on the R&B/Hip-Hop chart and 24 on the Independent Albums chart.

In 2009, Gangsta Boo released her third mixtape The Rumors (following her previous mixtapes Street Ringers Vol. 1 and Still Gangsta). She also released two mixtapes with DJ Fletch, Miss.Com (No DJ Version on iTunes) and 4 Da Hood. On June 27, 2011, she released her mixtape with Trap-A-Holics, Forever Gangsta. That same year, she collaborated with Yelawolf and Eminem on the song "Throw It Up".

On May 27, 2014, the extended play Witch, a collaboration with La Chat, was released. On October 14, 2014, Gangsta Boo teamed up with BeatKing and released a collaborative mixtape, Underground Cassette Tape Music, Vol. 1. In 2018, a successor mixtape titled Underground Cassette Tape Music, Vol. 2, was released.

Gangsta Boo was featured on the Run the Jewels track "Love Again (Akinyele Back)" from their 2014 album Run the Jewels 2, and reappeared on the track "Walking in the Snow" from their 2020 album RTJ4. In 2022, she was featured alongside GloRilla on the song "FTCU" by rapper Latto. At the time of her death, she had been working on an album that was planned to be titled The BooPrint.

== Death ==
On January 1, 2023, at the age of 43, Mitchell was found dead on the front porch of her mother's home in the Whitehaven neighborhood of Memphis. Memphis Police Department stated that there was no evidence of foul play. Her autopsy revealed cocaine, fentanyl, and alcohol in her system; on June 15, her cause of death was listed as an accidental overdose of cocaine that had been cut with fentanyl.

== Discography ==
=== Solo albums ===
- Enquiring Minds (1998)
- Both Worlds *69 (2001)
- Enquiring Minds II: The Soap Opera (2003)

=== With Three Six Mafia ===
- Mystic Stylez (1995)
- Chapter. 1 The End (1996)
- Chapter 2: World Domination (1997)
- When the Smoke Clears: Sixty 6, Sixty 1 (2000)
- Choices: The Album (2001)

=== Compilation albums ===
- Underground Vol. 1: 1991-1994 (1999)
- Underground Vol. 2: Club Memphis (1999)
- Underground Vol. 3: Kings of Memphis (2000)

=== With Da Mafia 6ix ===
- 6ix Commandments (2013)

=== With Prophet Posse ===
- Body Parts (1998)

=== With Hypnotize Camp Posse ===
- Hypnotize Camp Posse (2000)

=== With La Chat ===
- Witch (2014)

=== Mixtapes ===
- Still Gangsta (with DJ Smallz) (2006)
- Memphis Queen Is Back (Still Gangsta Slowed & Throwed) (2007)
- The Rumors (with DJ Drama) (2009)
- Miss.Com (with DJ Fletch) (2010)
- 4 Da Hood (with DJ Fletch) (2011)
- Foreva Gangsta (with Trap-A-Holics) (2011)
- It's Game Involved (2013)
- Underground Cassette Tape Music (with Beatking) (2014)
- Candy, Diamonds & Pill's (2015)
- Underground Cassette Tape Music 2 (with Beatking) (2018)
