= Mystic Stylez =

Studio album by Three 6 Mafia
- Released: May 30, 1995
- Recorded: 1994–1995
- Studios: The Production Room (Memphis, Tennessee)
- Genres: Memphis rap; horrorcore; gangsta rap
- Length: 73:41
- Label: Prophet
- Producers: DJ Paul; Juicy J

Three 6 Mafia chronology
Smoked Out, Loced Out (1994)	Mystic Stylez (1995)	Live by Yo Rep (B.O.N.E. Dis) (1995)

Professional ratings
Review scores
Source	Rating
AllMusic	3.5/5 stars

Mystic Stylez is the debut studio album by American hip-hop group Three 6 Mafia, released on May 30, 1995, by Prophet Entertainment. It was produced entirely by founding members DJ Paul and Juicy J.

In 2001, the album was re-released by Hypnotize Minds as More Mystic Stylez: The First Album, with this version featuring a new spoken intro from DJ Paul, as well as three new songs: "Classic Intro", "War With Us" (a song by the Tear da Club up Thugs), and "We Got Da Dope". It, however, omits "Da Beginning", "Live by Yo Rep", and "Back Against Da Wall".

== Background ==
=== Formation ===
Three 6 Mafia formed in 1991 in Memphis, Tennessee. Originally known as "Backyard Posse", the group consisted of DJ Paul, Juicy J, and Lord Infamous. The group formed through the release of numerous EPs from their own record company with Nick Scarfo, Prophet, which were sold around Memphis and throughout the South. More members joined the group over the years, including Koopsta Knicca, Gangsta Boo, and Crunchy Black.

=== Recording ===
Recording sessions for Mystic Stylez took place in a studio in northern Memphis known as The Production Room. The album was recorded on 16-track reel-to-reel tape. As Juicy J recalled, "We went in the studio and just made records, man. Go in there, got high, drank, and just made records. That's all I remember doing. I can't remember 'I came up with... Who did...' We just made the beats. We all just came in and contributed, and the shit came out hard." During the recording of Mystic Stylez, Three 6 Mafia were listening to music by artists and groups such as N.W.A., Geto Boys, Willie Hutch, KRS-One, and Isaac Hayes.

== Musical style and lyrics ==
Described as horrorcore, the overall soundscape of the album Mystic Stylez is considerably more foreboding than succeeding releases. Mystic Stylez features lyrical topics such as extremely graphic violence, murder, drugs, sexual practice, the occult, Satan and theistic Satanism. These subjects are mostly underscored by dark, menacing beats. Juicy J noted that the title for the album was inspired by the notion that all the performing artists on the recording all had "their own style."

According to author Roni Sarig, "Mystic Stylez clearly sounds like the expression of rappers who haven't so much made a deal with the Devil as spent some time partying with him".

== Controversy ==
During the development of Mystic Stylez, Three 6 Mafia was engaged in a feud with Ohio rap group Bone Thugs-n-Harmony. Three 6 Mafia accused Bone Thugs-n-Harmony of copying their style and released the diss song "Live by Yo Rep (B.O.N.E. Dis)". Juicy J spoke about the feud years after the album was released saying "Man when we did that we was young and stupid—being real. We was young and stupid. ... It wasn't ever no beef, man. We cool with them, they good people, just some stupid shit back in the day, man. They good dudes, man. We did some music with one of them, Krayzie Bone ... something back in the late 90s, something on Project Pat's album."

DJ Paul spoke about the feud, saying, "It wasn't a real beef ... It was more of a misunderstanding because we was rapping about triple six, devil shit, and tongue twisting over slow beats. We had been doing that since 1989 and then all of a sudden when Bone came out—I think it was 1993 ... We didn't know the Faces of Death album because it was their underground stuff. Just like they probably didn't know our underground stuff. When they came out with 'Thuggish Ruggish Bone' and all of that stuff and we hear somebody kind of on our same style: Faces of Death, redrum, murder, 6-6-6, tongue twisting. We were like, 'Damn these dudes done stole our style!' [Laughs] That's why we got mad about it. We ran into each other a couple of times and there was a push or something. But there was never no fight or nothing like that." DJ Paul also recounted the eventual reconciliation between the two groups: "Our first song was with Krayzie Bone on Project Pat's Ghetty Green album maybe in 1997 [or] 1998 or something like that. We've been cool ever since then."

== Exposure, recognition, and legacy ==
Regarded as "one of the essential Southern hip-hop albums", Mystic Stylez has been described as a defining example of horrorcore. The album led the way for a whole subset of Memphis rap and would influence other artists for decades to come. Despite not getting popularity and instead being an underground album, Mystic Stylez has been praised by critics and was put at number 74 on Complex's list "The 90 Best Rap Albums of the '90s". Mystic Stylez is cited as one of the forerunners of crunk and trap.

The group's debut into exposure had a rocky beginning mostly because local Memphis radio, at first, refused to play Three 6 Mafia's music. However, when staff heard "Da Summa", they eventually decided to play it, making it the group's first radio-aired song.

== Track listing ==
Original version

- All songs are produced by DJ Paul and Juicy J

Mystic Stylez
No.	Title	Writer(s)	Length
1.	"Da Beginning"		1:14
2.	"Break da Law ('95)"		4:21
3.	"Da Summa"		4:43
4.	"Live by Yo Rep (B.O.N.E. Dis)" (featuring Kingpin Skinny Pimp & Playa Fly)		5:13
5.	"In Da Game"		4:04
6.	"Now I'm Hi' - Part 3" (featuring Playa Fly)		5:10
7.	"Long Nite"		4:35
8.	"Sweet Robbery - Part 2"		4:46
9.	"Back Against da Wall" (featuring Kingpin Skinny Pimp)		4:51
10.	"Fuckin' wit' Dis Click"		6:18
11.	"All Or Nothin'"		4:54
12.	"Gotta Touch 'Em - Part 2"		4:54
13.	"Tear Da Club Up (Da Real)"	Paul Beauregard; Ricky Dunigan; Jordan Houston; Lola Mitchell; Darnell Carlton; Robert Phillips	4:35
14.	"Big Bizness (Screwed)"		2:18
15.	"Mystic Stylez" (featuring Playa Fly, La Chat & M.C. Mack)		6:21
16.	"Porno Movie"		5:24
Total length:			73:41

2001 reissue

More Mystic Stylez: The First Album (2001 Reissue)
No.	Title	Length
1.	"Classic Intro"	0:19
2.	"War With Us"	4:25
3.	"We Got da Dope"	2:40
4.	"Fuckin With Dis Click"	6:16
5.	"Now I'm Hi"	5:08
6.	"Break da Law"	4:22
7.	"Sweet Robbery"	4:43
8.	"In da Game"	4:04
9.	"Big Bizness"	2:17
10.	"Da Summa"	4:43
11.	"Gotta Touch Em"	4:54
12.	"Porno Movie"	5:27
13.	"Tear Da Club Up"	4:36
14.	"All Or Nuthin'"	4:55
15.	"Long Nite"	4:35
16.	"Mystic Stylez"	6:21
Total length:		69:45

== Personnel ==
Vocal artists

- DJ Paul
- Juicy J
- Lord Infamous
- Crunchy Black
- Koopsta Knicca
- Gangsta Boo
- MC Mack
- Lil' Fly
- La' Chat
- Kingpin Skinny Pimp
- Lil Gin

Production and instrumentation

- DJ Paul and Juicy J – producers
- Wayne Tucker – bass guitar
- DJ Paul – keyboards
- Archie Luv – audio engineer

Other staff

- M&L Photography – cover photograph
- CMYK – art direction and design
- Teflon Music – publishing

== Charts ==
Chart (1995)	Peak position
US Top R&B/Hip-Hop Albums (Billboard)	59
