= Three 6 Mafia =

American hip-hop group

- DJ Paul, Koopsta Knicca, Crunchy Black, Lord Infamous, Juicy J, and Gangsta Boo. Vibe magazine, 1998.

Background information
- Also known as: Triple Six Mafia; Tear Da Club Up Thugs; Backyard Posse; Da Mafia 6ix; 666 Mafia
- Origin: Memphis, Tennessee, U.S.
- Genres: Southern hip-hop; gangsta rap; horrorcore; crunk
- Works: Three 6 Mafia discography
- Years active: 1991–2012; 2019–present
- Labels: Hypnotize Minds; Prophet; Columbia; Sony; Sony Urban; Loud; Relativity; RED
- Members: DJ Paul; Juicy J Crunchy Black
- Past members: Lord Infamous; Koopsta Knicca; Gangsta Boo

Three 6 Mafia is an American hip-hop group from Memphis, Tennessee, formed in 1991. Emerging as a horror-themed underground hip-hop group, they went on to enjoy mainstream success. The group's 1995 debut album Mystic Stylez became an influential cult classic. They have released music on independent labels such as Prophet Entertainment and their own Hypnotize Minds label, as well as Relativity, Loud, and Columbia Records.

Two of their albums are RIAA-certified platinum: When the Smoke Clears: Sixty 6, Sixty 1 (2000) and Most Known Unknown (2005), with the latter featuring their hit single "Stay Fly". In 2006, the group won the Academy Award for Best Original Song at the 78th Academy Awards for their song "It's Hard out Here for a Pimp" from the film Hustle & Flow. The group's latest studio album, Last 2 Walk, was released in 2008. Three 6 Mafia's worldwide album sales stand at 5.5 million as of 2016.

== History ==
=== 1988–1990: Origins ===
Three 6 Mafia's founding members became musicians at young ages. In 1988, DJ Paul, at age 11, was taking piano lessons, and his half-brother, Lord Infamous, age 15, was a singer practicing bass and electric guitar. The two would compose songs together, with Paul playing piano and drums while Infamous played bass, guitar and sang.

At the same time, in North Memphis, Tennessee, Juicy J, at age 13, was learning how to DJ as well as rap. He had initially wanted to be a singer, but in the late 1980s and early 1990s he fell in love with the gangsta rap style, and he, like his future founding group members across town, wanted to make music like popular artists at the time such as N.W.A and Geto Boys.

In 1989, DJ Paul and Lord Infamous formed the duo "Da Serial Killaz". It was at this time they distributed their own mixtapes of popular songs at school, and Lord Infamous had started rapping with his signature triple time flow. Juicy J was also creating his own mixes by this time but was not putting his raps on tapes just yet.

=== 1991–1992: The beginning ===
By 1991, DJ Paul had already begun to make a name for himself in the local hip-hop scene through DJing at local clubs, such as Club 380 Beale, where he got his first opportunity to perform. His mixtapes, which were gradually evolving to include more and more original content of "Da Serial Killaz", also helped spread word of his talents. At the time, the hip-hop scene in Memphis had not taken a fully fledged form yet, but early works by artists such as DJ Spanish Fly and DJ Squeeky were hinting at what was to come. Meanwhile, Lord Infamous was still rapping and evolving his lyrical style. In North Memphis, Juicy J was slowly building a name for himself as well, now that he was making his own songs and distributing them with his mixtapes, as well as DJing at local clubs with his mentor.

That same year, DJ Paul and Juicy J first crossed paths after Juicy sought out Paul in 1991 for help making beats. The two quickly grew fond of each-other's musical styles and the two subsequently teamed up with Lord Infamous to form the group "The Backyard Posse". DJ Paul and Lord Infamous still continued work as "Da Serial Killaz" by themselves, and in 1992 released the first legitimate original recording to come out of the eventual Three 6 Mafia camp, "Portrait of a Serial Killa". Featuring dark beats by Paul and horrorcore-styled lyrics from Lord Infamous and DJ Paul, this tape is recognized in its raw form as a pioneering work of horrorcore hip-hop. Juicy J in the meantime released his debut hard copy mixtape, Volume 5, that same year, as well as his seminal track in its original form, "Slob on My Knob".

=== 1993–1996: Debut, Mystic Stylez and Chapter 1: The End ===
The first notable release from members of the group that dropped in 1993 was DJ Paul and Lord Infamous's Come With Me to Hell, which featured original forms of future Three 6 Mafia hits such as "Tear da Club Up" and "Porno Movie". Paul's "DJ Paul Volume 12" mixtape was also released at this time. That same year, while recording music for "The Backyard Posse", Lord Infamous rapped a line referring to his crew as the "Triple Six Mafia". The group later adopted the name, seeing that the name more closely matched the bleak and dark imagery of their music.

Juicy J had yet to release a notable work of his own at this point, but in 1994 that would change with Vol. 9: It's On and Vol. 10: Chronicles of the Juice Manne. Similar to Paul and Infamous's works the previous year, these tapes featured what would turn out to be some of the framework of future hit songs.

Also in 1994, the group added its fourth official member, rapper Koopsta Knicca (Robert Cooper Phillips). Following the addition, the group released their first unified release with the mixtape Smoked Out, Loced Out, which featured fellow budding local rappers Gangsta Blac, Kingpin Skinny Pimp, Lil Fly, 211, K-9, Lil Glock and S.O.G. That same year, Koopsta Knicca recorded the original version of what would become his first solo album, Da Devil's Playground.

1994 also marked a significant milestone for the group, when Paul and Juicy, alongside local entrepreneur Nick Scarfo, formed Prophet, their first imprint. Through the label, the Prophet Posse was created, which was a looser collective that consisted of several local Memphis rappers who associated closely with Paul and Juicy J and ultimately signed onto the label, but were not members of Triple 6 Mafia. It was at this time when Juicy J's older brother, Project Pat, emerged with his debut, Solo Tape.

In 1995 the group filled out when it officially added North Memphis rapper Crunchy Black and Whitehaven, Memphis rapper Gangsta Boo. It was later this year when the group shifted its name to Three 6 Mafia and released its debut album Mystic Stylez on Prophet. The LP earned them widespread recognition and attention locally and in the southern underground hip-hop scene, and as a result, Prophet landed a distribution deal with Select-O-Hits. The group's first song on the radio was "Da Summa".

Three 6 Mafia's logo, seen on every album since Chapter 1: The End

In 1996, the group released Chapter 1: The End, its first non-lo-fi music record. At the helm of Prophet, DJ Paul and Juicy J would produce and release a handful of albums of some of the label's other acts, including Gangsta Blac's Can It Be? and Kingpin Skinny Pimp's King of Da Playaz Ball in 1996. At the end of 1996, however, DJ Paul and Juicy J had a falling-out with Nick Scarfo, and a lengthy legal lawsuit ensued between the two sides over Prophet. It was at this time when Paul and Juicy laid the framework for Hypnotize Minds, their own independent label, which would become the powerhouse for Three 6 Mafia’s music. In 1997, Three 6 Mafia and Hypnotize Minds signed a distribution deal with Relativity.

=== 1997–2000: Chapter 2: World Domination and When the Smoke Clears: Sixty 6 Sixty 1 ===
In 1997, after forming Hypnotize Minds, the group signed a deal with Sony and began working on what would become its first RIAA certified album, Chapter 2: World Domination. Polishing up their darker sound for a more palatable aesthetic while still retaining their authenticity, Chapter 2: World Domination went on to reach RIAA Gold status, selling over 800,000 copies in the United States. The LP peaked at no. 40 on the Billboard Top 200. The LP included the club anthem "Tear Da Club Up". At this point in the group's evolution, DJ Paul and Juicy J began expanding their brand and focused on developing Hypnotize Minds. Along with Three 6 Mafia, they brought along several artists from Prophet in their transition to Hypnotize Minds, creating the Hypnotize Camp Posse, the successor of the Prophet Posse. Over the next few years, the new label would put out and the Prophet Posse's Body Parts, The Kaze (trio of Project Pat, M.C. Mack and Scan Man)'s Kamakazie: Timez Up, Indo G's, Angel Dust, Gangsta Boo's Enquiring Minds, Project Pat's Ghetty Green, and Hypnotize Camp Posse's self titled album (Three 6 Mafia Presents: Hypnotize Camp Posse).

In 1999, Tear da Club up Thugz, a subgroup of Three 6 Mafia members in the founding trio of DJ Paul, Juicy J, and Lord Infamous, released CrazyNDaLazDayz, which is recognized as one of if not the first album made entirely in the "crunk" production style. The album included Juicy J's solo "Slob on My Knob" and went on to be certified Gold by the RIAA. CrazyNDaLazDayz peaked at no. 18 on the Billboard Top 200 music chart. Later that year, group member Koopsta Knicca's debut album, Da Devil's Playground: Underground Solo, was released independently, although like all the Hypnotize Minds albums, was still produced by DJ Paul and Juicy J.

In 2000, the group soared to new heights in the crunk music genre, carried by their most successful LP, When the Smoke Clears: Sixty 6, Sixty 1. The album went on to achieve RIAA Platinum status, a first for the group, and spawned the single "Sippin' on Some Syrup", which featured UGK.

2000 represented a troubling year for the group. The Prophet Posse, which to this point had still been working closely with Hypnotize Minds in an auxiliary-type relationship, disbanded, and its members who had not made the transition to Hypnotize Minds ceased making music with Three 6 Mafia and the rest of Hypnotize Minds. Moreover, group member Koopsta Knicca was forced out of Three 6 Mafia due to ongoing legal issues, which culminated with his 2000 robbery incarceration, which voided his contract with Sony and forbade him from recording with the group. Koopsta Knicca was notably absent from the album cover of When the Smoke Clears: Sixty 6 Sixty 1 and music videos that accompanied tracks on the album because of his incarceration, despite still being a member of the group at the time of the album's release.

=== 2001–2004: Choices and Da Unbreakables ===
Despite losing Koopsta Knicca from its ranks and cutting ties officially with Prophet, Three 6 Mafia and Hypnotize Minds were still successful. In 2001, the group released the soundtrack to the DJ Paul, Juicy J and Hypnotize Minds-produced film Choices. The soundtrack was released as a studio album and (Choices: The Album), kept the Three 6 name and Hypnotize Minds brand growing. Moreover, Juicy and Paul successfully positioned Project Pat to become the new star of Hypnotize Minds, with his 2001 LP Mista Don't Play: Everythangs Workin hitting #4 on the Billboard 200 and being certified Gold by the RIAA, being thus far the only Three 6 Mafia affiliate or member to release an RIAA-certified solo album. 2001 also saw Gangsta Boo leave Three 6 Mafia following the release of Choices: The Album, citing a variety of reasons including group dynamics, religion, alleged financial mismanagement and her desire to pursue a solo career.

In 2002, Juicy J and DJ Paul re-released their remastered and dramatically updated "Vol. 10" and "Vol. 16" albums respectively as Chronicles of the Juice Man, and Underground Volume 16: For da Summa. These LPs represented their solo studio LP debuts and the last piece of some of their older sound, effectively giving way to full on crunk.

In 2003, the latest incarnation of Three 6 Mafia, DJ Paul, Juicy J, Lord Infamous, and Crunchy Black, released their album Da Unbreakables. Spawning the hit single "Ridin' Spinners", the album was a success, with the RIAA certifying it Gold by the RIAA. In 2004, Three 6 Mafia began to mobilize for what would become their domination over hip-hop. They were working on a sequel to their 2001 film, as well as another studio LP. But DJ Paul, Juicy J, and Hypnotize Minds's Frayser Boy, were about to ink a deal with the directors of Hustle & Flow to write the original track ‘It’s Hard Out Here for a Pimp‘ for the film that would ultimately result in the group winning an Oscar.

=== 2005–2006: Academy Award, Choices II: The Setup and Most Known Unknown ===
During 2005, many members had left including Lord Infamous, and with that even more affiliates, but other acts such as Project Pat and Frayser Boy cropped up as successes to keep the camp moving forward. This moving forward reached its zenith in 2005–06 for Three 6 Mafia, wherein they became superstars of hip-hop. Firstly, they dropped the sequel to their Choices movie, Choices II: The Setup, and a studio album to go along with it that sold 400,000 copies. Secondly, they released their most commercially successful LP, Most Known Unknown, which charted at #3 on the Top 200 and went on to sell 1,600,000 copies in the United States, becoming their second album to go Platinum in America and their best selling overall. The LP featured 3 successful singles: "Side 2 Side", "Poppin' My Collar", and "Stay Fly". "Stay Fly" is Three 6 Mafia's most commercially successful song, being certified Double Platinum in America. The song featured 8Ball & MJG and Young Buck. The song also peaked at no. 13 on the Billboard Hot 100 music charts. "Poppin' My Collar", the remix which featured Project Pat, was certified Platinum by the RIAA and peaked at no. 21 on the Billboard Top 100. Also in 2005, they released an additional film, the comedy, Clean Up Men.

Three 6 Mafia's rise came to a head in 2006 when they became the first hip-hop group to win the Academy Award for Best Original Song with "It's Hard out Here for a Pimp" (which they co-wrote with Frayser Boy) as one of the theme songs for Hustle & Flow. They were also the first hip-hop group to perform at the ceremony, which they did with Hustle & Flow actress Taraji P. Henson reprising her chorus. Right before presenter Queen Latifah announced that they had won, she chuckled and sang the refrain from the song. The energy from DJ Paul, Juicy J, Crunchy Black, and Frayser Boy's on-stage presence and acceptance speech was infectious, causing that year's Oscar host Jon Stewart to quip "How come they're the most excited people here tonight? Why is that? They're thrilled! They're thrilled!.... That's how you accept an Oscar!"

=== 2007–2011: Last 2 Walk ===
On June 7, 2007, Sony announced the departure of Crunchy Black. He stated his primary reason for departing was to make a solo LP that DJ Paul and Juicy J had allegedly put off for years, as much of the material that he'd wanted on his solo LP was used for Most Known Unknown. Crunchy also later cited frustration over alleged financial mismanagement. Thereafter Three 6 Mafia consisted officially of DJ Paul and Juicy J.

The pair was featured along with Timbaland on fellow Memphis artist, Justin Timberlake's single, "Chop Me Up" from his 2007 album FutureSex/LoveSounds.

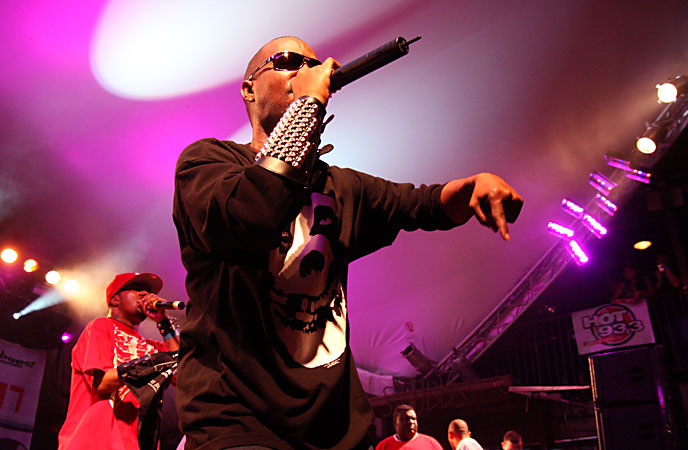
Juicy J (front) and DJ Paul (back) performing in late 2007

In 2007, DJ Paul and Juicy J landed their own reality television show, Adventures in Hollyhood, on MTV. The show focused on the pair balancing fun and studio work after their Oscar win. Project Pat, along with friends Big Triece and Computer, co-starred. The show premiered on April 5, 2007, on MTV and aired for one season.

Three 6 Mafia released their 9th studio album Last 2 Walk on June 24, 2008, after multiple delays. The album featured collaborations with Akon, Good Charlotte, Lyfe Jennings, UGK, and 8Ball & MJG among others.

After leaving Three 6 Mafia in 2005, Lord Infamous was featured on DJ Paul's second solo album Scale-A-Ton, which was released on May 5, 2009. Lord Infamous was featured on eight tracks. Juicy J's second solo album Hustle Till I Die was released on June 16, 2009. The LP featured Project Pat and other rappers such as V-Slash, Gucci Mane, Webbie and Gorilla Zoe.

In 2011, DJ Paul and Juicy J starred in VH1's cooking show Famous Food together with 7 other celebrities and eventually won 1st place. In an interview published in July 2011, DJ Paul cleared up some controversy from the show, involving Ashley Alexandra Dupré, best known from the Eliot Spitzer prostitution scandal.

In December 2011, Juicy J confirmed that he was the newest member of Wiz Khalifa's Taylor Gang – as an A&R and co-owner.

=== 2012–2018: Hiatus, Da Mafia 6ix, and independent endeavors ===
By the end of 2012, Juicy J had moved completely away from Three 6 Mafia work to focus on his solo career. During this time he released a number of solo mixtapes such as Rubba Band Business and Blue Dream & Lean. He also had begun frequently collaborating with Wiz Khalifa, appearing on a number of his mixtapes.

After a number of mixtapes, DJ Paul released his third solo studio album A Person of Interest on October 22, 2012. He announced that the album was a mix of gangsta rap and crunk music, with it also incorporating influences from dubstep and electronic dance music. The album featured past collaborator Gucci Mane, and also came with a bonus DVD including a self-titled short movie, music videos and behind the scenes footage.

On November 26, 2013, DJ Paul released Volume 16: The Original Masters, a remaster of his 1994 mixtape 4 Da Summer of '94, on iTunes. After releasing a series of singles, including the chart topping "Bandz a Make Her Dance" which featured 2 Chainz and Lil Wayne, Juicy J released his third solo studio album Stay Trippy under Taylor Gang Records, Kemosabe Records and Columbia Records on August 27, 2013. Juicy J has since stated that he would still "love to" participate in a Three 6 Mafia album in the future.

In 2013, it was announced that five of the six original members of Three 6 Mafia – DJ Paul, Crunchy Black, Koopsta Knicca, Lord Infamous and Gangsta Boo – were reuniting to form a new group, to be known as Da Mafia 6ix, with plans to release an album which was scheduled for a March 2014 release. At the time of the formation of Da Mafia 6ix, DJ Paul clarified that the collective was "not a Three 6 Mafia reunion" and described it as "a totally new group". The new group opted for a style reflecting their roots, focusing largely on the horrorcore foundations of their early works. Recording began in Las Vegas in late 2013. On November 12, 2013, Da Mafia 6ix released their first mixtape 6iX Commandments. The tape was almost entirely produced by DJ Paul and featured 8Ball & MJG, Krayzie Bone, Bizzy Bone, SpaceGhostPurrp and old HCP affiliates Kingpin Skinny Pimp and La Chat, among others. Juicy J and Project Pat also appeared as surprise guests on the posse song "Body Parts", being credited just as "& more" in the track listing. The mixtape was supported by the lead single "Go Hard". The mixtape also received a retail release and debuted at number 34 on the US Billboard Top R&B/Hip-Hop Albums chart. The group is managed by DJ Paul's management team, TBA Worldwide.

On December 20, 2013, Lord Infamous died of a heart attack at home in Memphis.

Gangsta Boo would leave Da Mafia 6ix in May 2014. DJ Paul explained it saying, "It was what we thought was going to be best for everybody. It just happened. Nobody forced nobody. It was a gut feeling." The reunited group's debut album, Watch What U Wish..., featured the three remaining members of the group as well as Lord Infamous, who appeared on a handful of tracks through several verses he had recorded prior to his death. The album was released on March 17, 2015. A month later, Crunchy Black was arrested for drug possession in Las Vegas. He had an outstanding arrest warrant stemming from a domestic violence charge and was sentenced to a total of 7 months in prison.

On October 9, 2015, Koopsta Knicca died after several days in urgent care following a stroke and intracranial aneurysm.

=== 2019–present: Reunion performances and tour ===
In August 2019, group leaders DJ Paul and Juicy J announced they would soon be reviving Three 6 Mafia and reuniting for performances together for the first time in several years. The slate of performances kicked off with a show on October 12, 2019 at the Landers Center in the Memphis metropolitan area, where the group hails from. The performance featured many of the group's biggest hits and included the other two living members of the original group, Crunchy Black and Gangsta Boo, as well as three fellow Hypnotize Camp Posse members who were so synonymous with the group that they were often incorrectly or unofficially labeled as members, Project Pat and La Chat. The series of performances, mostly taking place in the Southeastern United States, continued into 2020, and were successful to the point where DJ Paul and Juicy announced on February 12 an organized official reunion tour at locations across the United States would begin the following month. In April, the COVID-19 pandemic forced the postponement of the remainder of the tour.

The reunion performances and subsequent tour have further fueled speculation that Three 6 Mafia may come out with new music or ultimately a tenth studio album, but no timetable has been revealed.

Gangsta Boo was found dead at her mother's home on January 1, 2023, at the age of 43. DJ Paul confirmed her death via Instagram. Her cause of death was later revealed to be an accidental overdose with fentanyl, cocaine and alcohol found in her system.

== Members ==
=== Members ===
- DJ Paul (1991–2012, 2019–present)
- Juicy J (1991–2012, 2019–present)
- Crunchy Black (1991–2006, 2019–present)

=== Past members ===
- Lord Infamous (1991–2005; died 2013)
- Koopsta Knicca (1994–2000; died 2015)
- Gangsta Boo (1994–2001, 2019–2023; died 2023)

=== Posse ===
Three 6 Mafia never expanded beyond the six original members of the group, but it had an expanded version, known initially as Prophet Posse and later as Hypnotize Camp Posse (in reference to the Three 6 Mafia-created and sponsored labels, Prophet then Hypnotize Minds).

Prophet Posse and Hypnotize Camp Posse are known for their posse songs, which accompanied nearly every album release by Prophet and Hypnotize Minds from 1995 through 2005.

- Project Pat (1994–2012)
- La Chat (1994–1995, 1999–2003)
- Frayser Boy (2001–2008)
- Lil Wyte (2002–2012)
- The Kaze (1994–2000)
- M.C. Mack (1994–2000)
- Scan Man (1994–2000)
- K-Rock (1994–1998; died 2018)
- T-Rock (1997–2001)
- Lil Pat (1994–2000)
- M-Child (1996–1999)
- Chrome (2005–2008)
- Nigga Creep (1997–2000; died 2000)
- Kingpin Skinny Pimp (1994–1996)
- Indo G (1996–1998)
- Gangsta Blac (1994–1996)
- Lil Fly (1994–1995)
- Mr. Del (1999–2000)
- Droopy Drew Dog (1997–1998)
- Grandaddy Souf (2005–2006)
- Yung D (2008–2009)

== Discography ==
Studio albums

- Mystic Stylez (1995)
- Chapter 1: The End (1996)
- Chapter 2: World Domination (1997)
- When the Smoke Clears: Sixty 6, Sixty 1 (2000)
- Choices (2001)
- Da Unbreakables (2003)
- Choices II: The Setup (2005)
- Most Known Unknown (2005)
- Last 2 Walk (2008)

Subgroup albums

- CrazyNDaLazDayz as Tear Da Club Up Thugs (1999)
- Watch What U Wish... as Da Mafia 6ix (2015)

Posse albums

- Body Parts as Prophet Posse (1998)
- Hypnotize Camp Posse as Hypnotize Camp Posse (2000)

Collaborative albums

- Dat's How It Happen to'M with Fiend as Da Headbussaz (2002)
- Reindeer Games with Insane Clown Posse as The Killjoy Club (2014)

== Filmography ==
=== Feature films ===
- Choices: The Movie (2001)
- Choices II: The Setup (2005)
- Clean Up Men (2005)

=== Film appearances ===
- Hustle & Flow (2005) – "It's Hard out Here for a Pimp" is the official song of the movie
- Jackass 2 (2006) – they made an appearance in the movie, where they pay Dave England $200 to eat horse dung
- Rocky Balboa (2006) – "It's a Fight" is on the official soundtrack to the movie.
- Jackass 2.5 (2007)
- The Campaign (2012) – "Azz and Tittiez" is on the official soundtrack to the movie

=== Television series ===
- Adventures in Hollyhood (2007)
- Famous Food (2011)

=== Television appearances ===
- Jackass (2002)
- Rap City (2003)
- Wildboyz Deep South (2005) – episode 307
- Flavor of Love (2006)
- MTV's Jamie Kennedy's Blowin' Up (2006) – episode was banned due to controversy after the first time it aired
- The Simple Life (2006)
- Studio 60 on the Sunset Strip (2006) – episode: "Pilot" – musical guest on the fictional sketch comedy show within Studio 60
- WWE Friday Night SmackDown (2006) – performed "Some Bodies Gonna Get It" (a song they made for WWE Wrestler Mark Henry from the album WWE Wreckless Intent) live when Mark Henry wrestled Chris Benoit in May 2006. Henry continues to use the song as his entrance music.
- Entourage (2006) – in the episode "What about Bob?"
- My Super Sweet 16 (2006) Three 6 Mafia was the musical performance at the party
- MTV Cribs (2006) – season 12, episode 7
- 1 vs. 100 (2006)
- Criss Angel Mindfreak (2006) – episode: "Celebrity Séance"
- Rob & Big (2006) – Three 6 Mafia rapped at a party on episode 1 of season 1
- Punk'd (2006) – Juicy J sets up DJ Paul
- MTV Spring Break (2007)
- Wrestling Society X (2007) – episode 2
- Wild 'n Out (2007) – Spring Break edition
- The Andy Milonakis Show (2007)
- Mind of Mencia (2007) – season 3, episode 2
- Beauty and the Geek (2007) – episode 2 DJ Paul and Juicy J are judges in a rapping contest between the geeks
- Numb3rs (2008) – Juicy J and DJ Paul perform "Lolli Lolli (Pop That Body)" on the CBS drama
- The Late Late Show with Craig Ferguson (2008) – Juicy J and DJ Paul perform "Lolli Lolli (Pop That Body)"
- Paris Hilton's My New BFF (2009) – season 2, episode: "Learn From Your Mistakes" Three 6 Mafia interviewed Paris Hilton's Potential BFF's
- The Mo'Nique Show (2010) – Three 6 Mafia performs "It's Hard out Here for a Pimp"
- Los Twiins (2010) – episode 4
- Verzuz (2021) – battled Bone Thugs-n-Harmony

=== DVDs ===
- Choices: The Movie (2001)
- Choices II: The Setup (2005)
- Clean Up Men (2005)
- Ultimate Video Collection (2006)

== Musical inclusions in video games ==
- Saint's Row – "Who I Iz"
- NFL Street – "Who Gives a Fuck Where You From (Radio Edit)"
- Fight Night Round 4 – "Shove It (Three 6 Mafia Remix)" (Santigold featuring Project Pat)
- WWE SmackDown vs. Raw 2007, WWE SmackDown vs. Raw 2008, WWE SmackDown vs. Raw 2009, WWE SmackDown vs. Raw 2010, WWE SmackDown vs. Raw 2011, WWE '12, WWE '13, WWE 2K14, WWE 2K15, WWE 2K16, WWE 2K17, and WWE 2K18 for Mark Henry's theme music – "Some Bodies Gonna Get It"

== Awards and nominations ==
| Year | Awards | Category | Work | Result |
|---|---|---|---|---|
| 2006 | Academy Awards | Best Original Song | "It's Hard out Here for a Pimp" | Won |
| 2006 | BET Awards | Best Group | Three 6 Mafia | Nominated |
| 2006 | MTV Video Music Awards | Best Hip-Hop Video | "Stay Fly" | Nominated |
| 2006 | MTV Video Music Awards | MTV2 Award | "Stay Fly" | Nominated |
| 2007 | BET Awards | Best Group | Three 6 Mafia | Nominated |
| 2008 | American Music Awards | Favorite Rap/Hip-Hop Band, Duo or Group | Three 6 Mafia | Won |
| 2009 | BET Awards | Best Group | Three 6 Mafia | Nominated |
| 2010 | International Dance Music Awards | Best Hip Hop Dance Track | "Feel It" | Nominated |
| 2012 | Memphis Music Hall of Fame | Inductee | Three 6 Mafia | Won |
