= Lord Infamous =

American rapper from Tennessee (1973–2013)

Background information
- Also known as: The Scarecrow
- Born: Ricky Terrell Dunigan; November 17, 1973; Memphis, Tennessee, U.S.
- Died: December 20, 2013 (aged 40) Memphis, Tennessee, U.S.
- Genres: Southern hip-hop; horrorcore; trap; crunk; gangsta rap; Memphis rap
- Occupations: Rapper
- Years active: 1988–2013
- Labels: Black Rain; Hypnotize Minds; Prophet; Front line Muzik; 6th Enterprise; Wyte; Gutta Raw
- Formerly of: Three 6 Mafia
- Website: officialblackrainent.com/lord-infamous

Ricky Terrell Dunigan (November 17, 1973 – December 20, 2013), known professionally as Lord Infamous, was an American rapper from Memphis, Tennessee. He was the nephew of DJ Paul and one of the co-founders of Three 6 Mafia. His lyrics touched on macabre subjects such as Satanism, mass murder, and torture, along with more traditional themes such as sex and drug use.

== Biography ==
=== 1988–1991: Beginnings ===
Lord Infamous started his music career in the late 1980s with his half-brother, DJ Paul. They were fairly popular in the south Memphis area and released self-recorded tapes in their neighborhood, school, and local shops. Their first known tape entitled Portrait of a Serial Killa, was released in 1992.

=== 1991–2005: Three 6 Mafia ===
In 1991 Lord Infamous and DJ Paul met up with fellow north Memphis rapper and producer Juicy J. These three along with a few other local rappers formed a group initially called "The Backyard Posse", which later went on to be known as "Triple 6 Mafia". The first record deal for the group was with Nick Scarfo and Prophet Posse. Under the label they released their first underground album, Smoked Out, Loced Out in 1994. At the same time, Lord Infamous released his first underground solo album, Lord of Terror. Shortly after in 1995, the group changed its name to Three 6 Mafia and released its debut album, Mystic Stylez. At this time Three 6 Mafia members DJ Paul and Juicy J were creating their own record company, Hypnotize Minds, which Lord Infamous became a part of. The group went on to release four more mainstream albums and numerous solo projects through the mid-2000s, though during this time the group became smaller because of the departure of several members for various reasons.

=== 2006–2013: Black Rain Entertainment ===
In 2006, following jail time which led to a breach of contract with Sony, Lord Infamous was forced to end work with Three 6 Mafia, leaving the group on good terms. Lord Infamous later reunited with DJ Paul for Paul's 2009 solo album, Scale-A-Ton. This marked the first time they had worked together since Three 6 Mafia's 2005 album Choices II: The Setup.

Soon after his departure from Three 6 Mafia, Lord Infamous and long time friend and Memphis rapper II Tone formed a new record company, "Black Rain Entertainment". Shortly thereafter Memphis rapper Mac Montese and Atlanta rapper T-Rock became involved with the company, forming what is now known as "The Club House Click". They went on to release several group albums, solo albums and EPs, including several solo albums from Lord Infamous - The Man, The Myth, The Legacy in 2007, Futuristic Rowdy Bounty Hunter in 2010, Scarecrow Tha Terrible in 2011, Legendary Hits, King Of Horrorcore and Back From Tha Dead (Deadly Proverbs) in 2012. A group album with The Club House Click entitled Land Of Da Lost was released on November 27, 2012. On February 11, 2013, Lord Infamous released his eighth solo effort entitled Scarecrow Tha Terrible, Pt. Two. He released Voodoo, his final solo effort prior to his death, on October 11, 2013.

=== 2013–2014: Da Mafia 6ix ===
In 2013, Lord Infamous rejoined four of the original Three 6 Mafia members to form the group Da Mafia 6ix. The group released their debut mixtape 6ix Commandments on November 12, 2013, with plans to release a studio album in 2014.

Lord Infamous was also featured in three songs after his death on Da Mafia 6ix's Hear Sum Evil mixtape.

== Death ==
On December 20, 2013, Lord Infamous died of a heart attack in his sleep at his mother's home in Memphis, Tennessee. DJ Paul confirmed his death to online hip hop magazine HipHopDX, stating: "He had a heart attack in his sleep. His mother found him dead this morning. He had been dead, the doctors say, for about five hours."

== Discography ==
- Lord of Terror (1993)
- The Man, The Myth, The Legacy (2007)
- Futuristic Rowdy Bounty Hunter (2010)
- Scarecrow Tha Terrible (2011)
- Legendary Hits (2012)
- King of Horrorcore (2012)
- Back From Tha Dead (Deadly Proverbs) (2012)
- Scarecrow Tha Terrible, Pt. Two (2013)
- Fire & Ice (2013)
- Voodoo (2013)
- Legend (2014)
- Anarchy (EP) (2016)
