= Still Doubted? =

Studio album by Lil Wyte
- Released: June 19, 2012
- Recorded: 2010–2012
- Genre: Hardcore hip-hop; trap
- Length: 1:14:00
- Label: Wyte; Hypnotize Minds
- Producer: Big BOI Beats; Lex Luger; 2 Tall Beats

Lil Wyte chronology
The Bad Influence (2009)	Still Doubted? (2012)	No Filter (2013)

Singles from Still Doubted
- 1. "Sike" Released: February 7, 2012

Still Doubted? is the fifth studio album by rapper Lil Wyte, released on June 19, 2012. It was mostly produced by Wyte Music producer Big BOI Beats and Lex Luger, and features guest appearances from Young Buck, Frayser Boy, Lord Infamous and Liquid Assassin from Grave Plott, among others. It is Wyte's first album to not feature any production by HCP's DJ Paul and Juicy J.

== Background ==
Still Doubted? is Wyte's first album since 2009's The Bad Influence. It is a follow-up to his debut album Doubt Me Now and was released 10 years after it. Wyte spent three years touring and releasing mixtapes in preparation for his next album. He also founded his own record label Wyte Music and started signing and promoting new artists, such as Miscellaneous (who appears on the single "Sike"). Unlike his previous releases under HCP, which were crafted by DJ Paul and Juicy J, Still Doubted? was executively produced by Wyte, who wanted to make an album on his own.

A music video for "My Smoking Song" from Doubt Me Now was released on April 20, 2012, to promote the album. It was shot at the 41st Annual Ann Arbor Michigan Hash Bash, an annual event hosted to help legalize weed, which was attended by 15,000 people.

== Music and lyrics ==
Wyte described Still Doubted? as an "old-new Lil Wyte". The album features the usual drug and party-themed songs, as well as tracks on personal topics, which were rarely heard on his previous albums.

== Guests and production ==
Prior to the album's release Lil Wyte confirmed working with Pastor Troy, JellyRoll, Al Kapone, Miscellaneous, Liquid Assassin, Project Pat, Three 6 Mafia, Insane Clown Posse, Young Buck, Curren$y, Bubba Sparxxx, MJG, Tech N9ne, I-20 and Twista on the album. The ones who actually appear on the album are Pastor Troy, Al Kapone, Miscellaneous, Project Pat, Bubba Sparxxx, Partee, $hamrock, Lil Wil, Big Lazy, Thug Therapy, Frayser Boy, Young Buck, Lord Infamous, Liquid Assassin from Grave Plott and Miss Wyte.

The album was produced almost entirely by Wyte Music producer Big BOI Beats, with few tracks produced by Lex Luger, Wyte Music Rec and 2Tall. Although Lil Wyte confirmed in an interview that Three 6 Mafia members DJ Paul and Juicy J had produced some tracks, they didn't make the final cut. This is the first Lil Wyte album and the first album under HCP not to have any production done by DJ Paul and Juicy J.

== Singles ==
The first and only single "Sike" was released on February 7, 2012. A music video for the song was shot on Panama City Beach and released on June 9 on Wyte's YouTube channel.

== Critical reception ==
Professional ratings
Review scores
Source	Rating
Rapreviews.com	6.5/10 stars

The album received positive reviews. Josh Boutwell from Hubpages gave the album 4.5 stars out of 5, calling it his best since Phinally Phamous. Popculturez gave the album a positive review stating that hard-core, Southern-fried hip-hop fans should check out the album as Wyte delivers a quality of Memphis street-hop. This is Book Music also gave the album positive review, claiming that "Still Doubted? is an answer to anyone who has ever thought Lil Wyte could not make decent music." Steve Flash Juon from RapReviews gave the album 6.5 stars out of 10 praising him for sharpening his rhymes and songs like "Sold My Soul", "All Kinds of Drugs", and "Lesson Learned", but criticized the length of the album, saying that skipping tracks like "Yea Hoe", "Get Em Out of Durr", "Sike", and the skits would have resulted in a much stronger album.

== Commercial performance ==
Although the album didn't appear on the Billboard 200, it charted on the R&B/Hip-Hop Albums at #34 and on the Rap Albums at #23.

== Track listing ==
Track	Title	Producer(s)	Featured	Length
1	"Intro"	Big BOI Beats		1:17
2	"I Do It"	Big BOI Beats		4:27
3	"Stoner Night"	Big BOI Beats		3:28
4	"Sold My Soul"	Big BOI Beats	Pastor Troy	5:17
5	"U Don't Know Me"	Big BOI Beats		3:07
6	"All Kinds of Drugs"	Big BOI Beats; Lex Luger	Young Buck, Lil Wil	4:42
7	"Show Some Skin"	Big BOI Beats	Bubba Sparxxx	3:44
8	I'm Going Home	Big BOI Beats	Big Lazy	3:57
9	"(Interlude) Call Us"	Big BOI Beats	Thug Therapy	3:25
10	"M.E.M.P.H.I.S."	Big BOI Beats	Miscellaneous, Al Kapone	4:08
11	"Gun Down"	Big BOI Beats	Frayser Boy, Partee	4:25
12	"Welcome 2 the Gathering"	Big BOI Beats; Lex Luger	Lord Infamous, Liquid Assassin	3:44
13	"Yea Hoe"	Big BOI Beats	$hamrock	3:53
14	"Get Em Out of Durr"	Big BOI Beats	Partee	3:58
15	"Sike"	Big BOI Beats	Miscellaneous	3:57
16	"Lesson Learned"	2 Tall Beats		2:42
17	"Money Train Gang"	Big BOI Beats		4:01
18	"Wyte Speaks [Outro]"	Big BOI Beats		2:15
19	"Money"	Big BOI Beats; Lex Luger	Miss Wyte, Partee, Project Pat	4:36
20	Lost in My Zone	Lex Luger		4:06

== Charts ==
Chart (2013)	Peak position
Billboard Top R&B/Hip-Hop Albums	34
Billboard Top Rap Albums	23
