= Lil Wyte =

American rapper from Tennessee

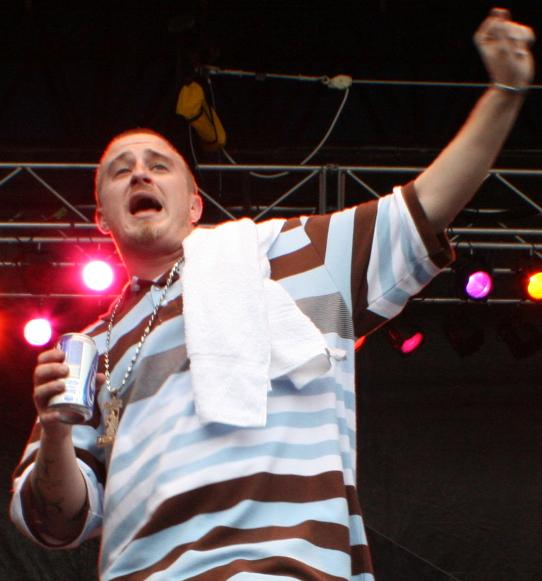
- Lanshaw performing at the Beale Street Music Festival in 2007

Background information
- Also known as: Boss Wyte
- Born: Patrick Dhane Lanshaw; October 6, 1982 (age 43); Memphis, Tennessee, U.S.
- Genres: Hip-hop
- Occupation: Rapper
- Years active: 2002–present
- Labels: Asylum; Hypnotize Minds; Wyte; Phixieous
- Website: www.wytestore.com

Patrick Dhane Lanshaw (born October 6, 1982), better known by his stage name Lil Wyte, is an American rapper and a member of the rap collective Hypnotize Minds and owner of the independent label Wyte Music.

== Early life ==
Growing up in Frayser, Lil Wyte discovered his rapping talent at a young age as he could rap Sir Mix-a-Lot's entire song "Baby Got Back" completely. He participated in freestyle battles at high school when he was in ninth grade. Lanshaw rapped with his friend "Lil Black", who inspired him to use the pseudonym "Lil Wyte" and write songs instead of freestyling.

Lanshaw dropped out of high school, but eventually earned his high school diploma.

== Music career ==
Lil Wyte was part of a local rap group, the Shelby Forest Click.

The group's home-made demo tape came to the attention of Three 6 Mafia. Juicy J and DJ Paul (one song in particular is said to have gotten him signed, a song titled Memphiz Playaz). Three 6 Mafia signed the rapper and worked later with his debut album. Lil Wyte appeared on Project Pat's song "Crash da Club" from his album Layin' da Smack Down in 2002. His debut album Doubt Me Now was released in 2003 and it became popular, selling over 135,000 copies without promotion. The album Doubt Me Now featured Juvenile, Three 6 Mafia, Frayser Boy, La Chat and Josey Scott. The album had three popular songs: "Oxy Cotton", "My Smoking Song", and "Acid".

He has been described as a rapid lyricist.

== Personal life ==
Lil Wyte passed up the opportunity of writing the song "It's Hard out Here for a Pimp", because he could not relate to the lyrics of having more than one woman.

Lil Wyte used three strains of marijuana to create his own strain of medical cannabis called OG WYTE Kush. It's available in 11 states. The three original strains are OG Kush, White Widow and Grand Daddy Purp.

In 2012 he was arrested in Clarksville, Tennessee, for DUI and drug possession.

== Discography ==
Studio albums

Year	Title	Peak chart positions		
Year	Title	U.S.	U.S. R&B	U.S. Rap
2003	Doubt Me Now: Released: March 4, 2003; Label: Hypnotize Minds	197	44	*
2004	Phinally Phamous: Released: October 19, 2004; Label: Hypnotize Minds/Wyte Music	64	6	4
2007	The One and Only: Released: June 5, 2007; Label: Hypnotize Minds/Warner Bros. Records/Asylum Records	46	10	3
2009	The Bad Influence: Released: August 25, 2009; Label: Hypnotize Minds/Asylum Records	104	18	5
2011	Year Round (with JellyRoll and BPZ, as SNO): Released: April 19, 2011; Label: Hypnotize Minds/Wyte Music	—	—	—
2012	Still Doubted?: Released: June 19, 2012; Label: Hypnotize Minds/Wyte Music	—	34	23
2013	No Filter (with JellyRoll): Released: July 16, 2013; Label: Phixieous Entertainment/Wyte Music	—	33	17
2014	B.A.R. (Bay Area Representatives) (with Frayser Boy): Released: February 4, 2014; Label: Phixieous Entertainment/Wyte Music	—	46	23
2014	No Sick Days: Released: April 20, 2014; Label: Phixieous Entertainment/Wyte Music	—	—	—
2016	No Filter 2 (with JellyRoll): Released: November 18, 2016; Label: Phixieous Entertainment/Wyte Music	—	47	—
2017	Drugs: Released: May 12, 2017; Label: Real Talk Entertainment	—	—	—
2017	Liquor: Released: September 15, 2017; Label: Real Talk Entertainment	—	—	—
2018	Memphis Legends (with Project Pat & Crunchy Black): Released: December 15, 2018; Label: Kholebeatz Records	—	—	—
2018	Lil Wyte: Released: December 21, 2018; Label: Phixeous Entertainment	—	—	—
2019	Drugs & Liquor (Deluxe Edition): Released: October 4, 2019; Label: Real Talk Entertainment	—	—	—
2020	Croptober (with Instigator): Released: October 2, 2020; Label: High Wayz Records/Tennessee Pushers/Wyte Music	—	—	—
2023	Family Recipe (with Wild Bill): Released: May 26, 2023; Label: Music Access, Inc./Wyte Music	—	—	—
2024	White Boyz Wasted (with Jp Mr. 724 & Barzz): Released: April 19, 2024; Label: Money by Any Meanz, Ent./Wyte Music	—	—	—
2024	Who TF is Justin Time? vs Lil Wyte (with Justin Time): Released: May 1, 2024; Label: Rebels Only/Wyte Music	—	—	—

Mixtapes

- 2008: Cocaine & Kush
- 2009: Cocaine Kush 2 (Love, Hate, Betrayal)
- 2009: Wyte Christmas
- 2010: Wyte Christmas 2 (Let It SNO)
- 2011: Wyte Christmas 3
- 2012: Wyte Out
- 2012: Wyte Boyz Wasted (with Barzz & J.P)
- 2013: Wyte Out Pt. 2
- 2013: July 16 (with JellyRoll)
- 2013: Wyte Christmas 4
- 2014: Wyte Lytes (with DJ Hylyte)
- 2016: Wyte Christmas 6 (with DJ Ritz)

== Singles ==
=== As lead artist ===
List of singles as lead artist, showing year released and album name
Title	Year	Album
"Oxy Cotton" (featuring Lord Infamous & Crunchy Black)	2003	Doubt Me Now
"I Sho Will"	2004	Phinally Phamous
"About 2 Get Raw" (with Devious T & Deuce One)	2010	Non-album single
"Sike" (featuring Miscellaneous)	2012	Still Doubted?
"Break the Knob Off" (with JellyRoll)	2013	No Filter
"This Down Here" (with JellyRoll & Jesse Whitley)	2013	No Filter
"Who's Comin with Me" (featuring ACE)	2015	Non-album singles
"Plot Thickens"	2015	Non-album singles
"Tennessee" (with Kholebeatz & Project Pat)	2016	Memphis Legends
"Where the Drugs at" (with Mr Spitfire & Lou Kane)	2016	Non-album singles
"Still Sippin" (featuring 46Simmy)	2016	Non-album singles
"Mean No Harm Rmx" (with Kholebeatz & Kraziak)	2017	Non-album singles
"Wake the Neighbors Up"	2017	Drugs
"Dope Boy Stuntin"	2017	Drugs
"Get Laid"	2017	Drugs
"No Tomorrow" (featuring Lil Truss, 2-Tone & Lady D)	2017	Non-album singles
"Drink It Down"	2017	Non-album singles
"I Forgive You"	2017	Liquor
"I Do It for the Hood"	2017	Liquor
"Doin Me Right Now"	2017	Liquor
"Too Cool"	2017	Liquor
"Roll in Peace" (Remix)	2017	Non-album singles
"Memphis 10"	2018	Non-album singles
"Ed, Edd, Eddy"	2018	Non-album singles
"Mood" (Remix)	2018	Non-album singles
"Scared"	2019	Non-album singles
"Wall 2 Wall" (with 38)	2019	Non-album singles
"I Forgive You" (Chopped & Screwed)	2019	Drugs & Liquor (Deluxe Edition)

=== As featured artist ===
Title	Year	Peak chart positions	Album
Title	Year	US R&B/HH	Album
"Who Gives a Fuck Where You From" (DJ Kay Slay featuring Three 6 Mafia, Frayser Boy and Lil Wyte)	2004	89	The Streetsweeper, Vol. 2

== Guest appearances ==
List of non-single guest appearances, with other performing artists, showing year released and album name
Title	Year	Other artist(s)	Album
"Crash da Club"	2002	Project Pat	Layin' da Smack Down
"Ridin' Spinners"	2003	Three 6 Mafia, La Chat	Da Unbreakables
"Mosh Pit"	2003	Three 6 Mafia, Josey Scott	Da Unbreakables
"Dangerous Posse"	2003	Three 6 Mafia, Hypnotize Camp Posse	Da Unbreakables
"Bay Area"	2003	Frayser Boy	Gone on That Bay
"H.C.P."	2003	Frayser Boy, Hypnotize Camp Posse	Gone on That Bay
"Who Gives a Fuck Where You From"	2004	DJ KaySlay, Three 6 Mafia, Frayser Boy	The Streetsweeper 2
"Water"	2005	Frayser Boy	Me Being Me
"Body Parts 3"	2005	Three 6 Mafia, Hypnotize Camp Posse	Most Known Unknown
"Posse Song"	2005	Frayser Boy, Hypnotize Camp Posse	Me Being Me
"Who Da Fuck You Playin' Wit?	2005	Three 6 Mafia, Frayser Boy	Choices II: The Setup
"Pass Dat Shit"	2005	Three 6 Mafia, Frayser Boy	Choices II: The Setup
"P.I.M.P."	2005	Three 6 Mafia, Frayser Boy	Choices II: The Setup
"Squeeze It"	2005	Three 6 Mafia, Frayser Boy	Choices II: The Setup
"Official Crunk Junt"	2005	Three 6 Mafia, Frayser Boy	Choices II: The Setup
"Who I Iz"	2005	Three 6 Mafia, Trillville	Choices II: The Setup
"Shoot Up da Club"	2005	Three 6 Mafia, Frayser Boy	Choices II: The Setup
"Stanky Stanky"	2005	Three 6 Mafia, Frayser Boy	Choices II: The Setup
"One Hitta Quitta"	2005	Three 6 Mafia, Frayser Boy	Choices II: The Setup
"I Sho Will (Remix)	2005	Lil Flip	Choices II: The Setup
"Posse Song"	2005	Three 6 Mafia, Frayser Boy	Choices II: The Setup
"Get They Ass Kick	2005	Chrome (Rapper), Lil Scrappy	Straight to the Pros
"H.C.P.	2005	Chrome (Rapper), Hypnotize Camp Posse	Straight to the Pros
"Squeeze It"	2005	Three 6 Mafia	Most Known Hits
"Yeeeeah"	2005	Trillville	Trillville Reloaded
"Hood Drug Warz	2006	DJ Kayslay, B.G., Three 6 Mafia	The Champions: North Meets South
"Big Problems"	2006	DJ Kayslay, Lil Jon, Lil Flip, Lil Scrappy	The Champions: North Meets South
"Rollin"	2008	Three 6 Mafia	Last 2 Walk
"Stupid High"	2009	Juicy J	
"I'm Gutta Bruh"	2009	Juicy J V-Slash	
"I'm Drunk (Remix)"	2009	DJ Paul, Lord Infamous	Scale-A-Ton
"Low Down Triple Six"	2010	Cuttroat, Three 6 Mafia, Project Pat	The Takeove
"Pop Another Pill"	2010	JellyRoll	
"Kuntry Boys"	2010	SMO & JellyRoll	
"Lose It"	2010	DJ Paul	To Kill Again The Mixtape
"What You Smoke"	2011	Bankrupt Records	Double Vision
"5 To 10"	2011	$hamrock, Crime Mob	Tha Wyterapper Show
"That's What I'm Cockin"	2011	Juicy J, JellyRoll, BPZ	Rubba Band Business
"My Blunt Smokes Better"	2011	DJ Paul	Pray for Forgiveness
"Warter on the Stove"	2011	DJ Paul, JellyRoll, BPZ	Pray for Forgiveness
"Mind Playin Trick on Me	2012	Insane Clown Posse, Anybody Killa	Smothered, Covered & Chunked
"In the Building"	2012	MJG, Young Dolph	Bitches Money Guns
"I'm Sprung"	2012	DJ Paul	A Person of Interest
"Lord Infamous Posse Song"	2012	Lord Infamous, Miscellaneous, $hamrock, Partee, Thugtherapy	Back from Dead: Deadly Proverbs
"Pill Popper"	2012	Lord Infamous, Project Pat, Partee	Back from Dead: Deadly Proverbs
"Put It in Yo Face"	2012	Lord Infamous	Back from Dead: Deadly Proverbs
"400 a Zip"	2012	Project Pat, Nasty Mane, BPZ	Belly On Full 2
"My Blunt Smokes Better"	2012	DJ Paul	For I Have Sinned
"Dope Fiend"	2013	Bizarre, St Luke	Laced Blunts
"Go White Boy"	2013	Pastor Troy	The Streets Need You
"Wasted"	2013	Twiztid, Liquid Assassin, Buckshot, Johnny Richter, Jared Gomes, Blaze Ya Dead Homie, JellyRoll, Ajax	A New Nightmare
"Hard Shit"	2013	DJ Paul, Drumma Boy	Clash of the Titans
"Betta Pray"	2013	(Koopsta Knicca, DJ Paul, Gangsta Boo, Lord Infamous, Crunchy Black) as Da Mafia 6ix, Outlawz	6ix Commandments
"Remember"	2013	Da Mafia 6ix	6ix Commandments
"Body Parts"	2013	Juicy J, DJ Paul, Gangsta Boo, Locodunit, J Green, Point Blank, Kokoe, Lord Infamous, Project Pat, Koopsta Knicca, Kingpin Skinny Pimp, Crunchy Black, La Chat	6ix Commandments
"On That"	2013	Gangsta Boo, La Chat	Witch
"Never Knew"	2013	JellyRoll, Jacob Scott, Einstagator & Adele	
"Memphis 10"	2014	MJG, DJ Paul, Frayser Boy	Too Pimpin 2.0
"Where My Mind Go"	2014	K.Kerr, Twisted Insane	
"1 Shot"	2014	Colby Bright, Whitney Peyton	
"Radioactive"	2014	Sunset Black, Gent Jack	X-Rated Mafia Records
"Radioactive 2016" prod by King Killumbia	2014	Sunset Black, Gent Jack	X-Rated Mafia Records
"Smoke Sum"	2014	Tori WhoDat	Krewedentials
"Bad Bitches"	2014	Tori WhoDat	Krewedentials
"Too Petty"	2014	Da Mafia 6ix, Fiend, La Chat	Hear Sum Evil
"Loud Loud"	2015	DJ Paul	Da Light Up, Da Poe Up
"Loud Loud (Remix)"	2015	DJ Paul	Da Light Up, Da Poe Up
"Mosh Pit"	2015	Da Mafia 6ix, The Killjoy Club	Watch What U Wish
"Crazy"	2016	Bukshot, JellyRoll, Madchild	Assimilation
"Radioactive	2016	Sunset Black	
"Drugs"	2017	King Killumbia	Welcome to Killumbia
"IDGAF" prod by Witeout	2017	King Killumbia, Pastor Troy, Kaotik	TBA
"Reap What You Sow"	2017	Jaliet Caprana	Beatz N the Beast
"No High Enough"	2017	DJ Paul	Underground Vol. 17 for da Summa
"Poe Up Wetty"	2017	DJ Paul	Underground Vol. 17 for da Summa
"Going Down"	2017	Prime Suspects	The Acents
"Stop All That Talkin"	2017	Profit Levi & Big Dutta	
"Stacks"	2017	Mark James	Sessions
"Thrillz"	2017	DJ Spanish Jay	Da Fix
"Mainiac"	2017	Mavrick & Big Led	P.O.P.
"Too Hard on Myself"	2018	JR Badinfluence & LMO	
"This Is Me"	2018	Slikk Mik	
"Reap What You Sow"	2018	Jaliet Caprana	Beatz N the Beast
"Help"	2018	D3!, Josh Andrews of Spinless & Heartless	Help
"Too High"	2018	G Baby, Joey Da Spitta	
"Straight Outta Tennessee"	2018	Smoke Corleone	
"Let It Bang"	2018	Madtatter & Rainy Louis	Ten Over Six
"Get on My Level"	2018	Flo the Rapper and Memo	
"Shooter Mcgavin"	2018	Beni-Hana	
"Psychotic"	2018	JpMr724	Dream Schemes Vol 1
"Let's Talk About It"	2018	Hollywood & Frayser Boy	
"When I Die" (album version)	2019	One Man Kru, Kapital Z	Legend of the Earth
"Lost Leaders"	2019	Mexiveli, KingPin Skinny Pimp, Koopsta Knicca of Three 6 Mafia	Da Devil's Playground 2
"Grim"	2019	Blazin J	
"On My Way"	2019	WhiteGold	Flying Solo 2
"Papertrail"	2019	Young T & Frayser Boy	
"Timeline (Remix)"	2019	Bug-Z	
"F**k Up"	2019	EmzyG	Anything But Broke
"All I Know"	2020	White Wulf	Alter Ego
"Jesus and Rock and Roll"	2020	JellyRoll	A Beautiful Disaster
"Smoke Au Blunt"	2020	Beezy B	
"Ball Like Me"	2020	Benjamin Dolluh	Banking on Benjamin
"Just Wanna"	2020	Burden	My Own Worst NME
"Now They Wanna"	2020	DayDay	
"20 White Boy$"	2020	Mugs Amillion	
"From the Kountry"	2020	Iron Mic Savage	
"What You Want"	2020	Tha Gutta! Dream & Shotgun Shane	
"All I Do Is Smoke"	2020	The GoldynChylde & C Hustle	
"Get Turnt"(Remix)	2020	D-Ray What It Do	
"I.D.G.A.F."	2020	Free Lance	
"Thru the Hood"	2020	Wavy Inc	
"Daweedgotmehigh"	2020	Rittz	Rittzmas
"Train Wreck"	2021	Ryan Upchurch	Mud to Gold
