= Most Known Unknown =

Studio album by Three 6 Mafia
- Released: September 27, 2005
- Recorded: 2004–2005
- Genres: Hardcore hip-hop; Southern hip-hop; crunk
- Length: 77:48
- Labels: Hypnotize Minds; Columbia; Sony Urban
- Producers: DJ Paul (exec.); Juicy J (also exec.); David Banner; Mr. Collipark

Three 6 Mafia chronology
| Choices II: The Setup (2005) | Most Known Unknown (2005) | Most Known Hits (2005) |

Alternative cover

Singles from Most Known Unknown
- 1. "Stay Fly" Released: July 7, 2005; 2. "Poppin' My Collar" Released: January 18, 2006; 3. "Side 2 Side" Released: September 12, 2006

Professional ratings
Review scores
| Source | Rating |
|---|---|
| AllMusic | 4.5/5 stars |
| The Austin Chronicle | 4/5 stars |
| Pitchfork | 8.1/10 |
| Vibe | 4/5 |
| The Village Voice | B− |

Most Known Unknown is the eighth studio album by American hip-hop group Three 6 Mafia. It was released on September 27, 2005, by Hypnotize Minds, Sony Urban Music, and Columbia Records.

This album is known for having some of Three 6 Mafia's biggest hits, including "Stay Fly" featuring Young Buck and 8Ball & MJG, "Poppin' My Collar" featuring Project Pat (though Pat's verse wasn't included in the first edition but would later be included in the re-issue), and "Side 2 Side" featuring Bow Wow and Project Pat (with Bow Wow and Project Pat's verses, like the "Poppin' My Collar" remix, would not be used in the first edition but would be released in the re-issue, along with another remix featuring Kanye West and a slightly different-sounding melody). This album would prove to be their biggest success to date, topping the commercial success of their 2000 album, When the Smoke Clears: Sixty 6, Sixty 1. The original version was released on a regular CD version as well as a DualDisc version featuring The Life of the Most Known Unknowns documentary, "Stay Fly" video with a live performance, and the uncut video of "Side 2 Side". The re-release also had a bonus version, with two remixes of "Side 2 Side". A chopped and screwed version by Michael Watts was also released.

Along with chart-topping hits, this album also featured several well-known guest rappers, including Mike Jones, Paul Wall, Slim Thug, Trick Daddy, Mr. Bigg, 8Ball & MJG, Young Buck, Remy Ma, Bow Wow (only on re-issue), Kanye West (only on re-issue), Lil' Flip, as well as the Hypnotize Camp Posse (Three 6 Mafia, Project Pat, Frayser Boy, Lil Wyte, and others).

Three 6 Mafia member Lord Infamous was notably omitted from this album. Many rumors speculated that he either left the group or was kicked out; these rumors were put to rest when DJ Paul told sources that the reason for Infamous not being on the album was due to a stint in jail, leaving Crunchy Black, DJ Paul, and Juicy J the only Three 6 Mafia members to be included on the album.

Most Known Unknown opened at number 3 on the Billboard 200 and number 1 on the Top R&B/Hip-Hop Albums with 125,000 copies sold. It was certified gold by the RIAA the week following its release on November 2, 2005, and reached platinum status by June 26, 2006.

== Track listing ==
| No. | Title | Writer(s) | Producer(s) | Length |
|---|---|---|---|---|
| 1. | "Most Known Unknown Hits" | | DJ Paul; Juicy J | 1:27 |
| 2. | "Stay Fly" (featuring Young Buck and 8Ball & MJG) | J. Houston; P. Beauregard; D. Carlton; P. Smith, M. Goodwin; D. Brown | DJ Paul; Juicy J | 3:56 |
| 3. | "Roll with It" (featuring Project Pat) | J. Houston; Beauregard; Carlton; P. Houston | DJ Paul; Juicy J | 3:02 |
| 4. | "Don't Violate" (featuring Frayser Boy) | Houston; Beauregard; Carlton; C. Coleman | DJ Paul; Juicy J | 3:49 |
| 5. | "Swervin" (featuring Mike Jones and Paul Wall) | Houston; Beauregard; Carlton; M. Jones; P. Slayton | DJ Paul; Juicy J | 3:35 |
| 6. | "Knock tha Black Off Yo Ass" (featuring Project Pat) | J. Houston; Beauregard; Carlton; P. Houston | DJ Paul; Juicy J | 4:20 |
| 7. | "Poppin' My Collar" (featuring Mr. Bigg) | Houston; Beauregard; Carlton; D. Pears | DJ Paul; Juicy J | 2:56 |
| 8. | "Hard Hittaz" (featuring Boogiemane) | Houston; Beauregard; Carlton; B. Hunt | DJ Paul; Juicy J | 4:12 |
| 9. | "Side 2 Side" | Houston; Beauregard; Carlton | DJ Paul; Juicy J | 3:38 |
| 10. | "Half on a Sack" | Houston; Beauregard; Carlton | DJ Paul; Juicy J; David Banner | 3:26 |
| 11. | "Skit" | | DJ Paul; Juicy J | 0:26 |
| 12. | "When I Pull Up at the Club" (featuring Paul Wall and Mr. Bigg) | Houston; Beauregard; Carlton; P. Slayton; D. Pears | DJ Paul; Juicy J | 4:32 |
| 13. | "Pussy Got Ya Hooked" (featuring Remy Ma) | Houston; Beauregard; Carlton; R. Smith | DJ Paul; Juicy J | 4:20 |
| 14. | "Don't Cha Get Mad" (featuring Lil Flip and Mr. Bigg) | Houston; Beauregard; Carlton; W. Weston; D. Pears | DJ Paul; Juicy J | 3:23 |
| 15. | "Body Parts 3" (featuring Boogiemane, Frayser Boy, Lil Wyte, Chrome Korleone, Grandaddy Souf & Project Pat) | J. Houston; Beauregard; Carlton; P. Houston; P. Lanshaw; C. Coleman; Chrome Korleone; D. Pannell; B. Hunt; A. Watts | DJ Paul; Juicy J | 4:07 |
| 16. | "Stay Fly" (Remix) (featuring Slim Thug, Trick Daddy and Project Pat) | J. Houston; Beauregard; Carlton; P. Houston; S. Thomas; M. Young | DJ Paul; Juicy J | 3:51 |
| 17. | "Outro" | | DJ Paul; Juicy J | 2:43 |
| Total length: | | | | 57:43 |

Bonus tracks
| No. | Title | Writer(s) | Producer(s) | Length |
|---|---|---|---|---|
| 18. | "Got It 4 Sale" (featuring Chrome Korleone) | Houston; Beauregard; Carlton; D. Pannell | DJ Paul; Juicy J; Mr. Collipark | 4:32 |
| 19. | "Let's Plan a Robbery" | Houston; Beauregard; Carlton | DJ Paul; Juicy J | 3:06 |
| 20. | "Dancin on a Pole" (featuring Chrome Korleone) | Houston; Beauregard; Carlton; D. Pannell | DJ Paul; Juicy J | 3:48 |
| 21. | "Ain't Got Time for Gamez" | Houston; Beauregard; Carlton | DJ Paul; Juicy J | 4:04 |
| 22. | "Ride" | Houston; Beauregard; Carlton | DJ Paul; Juicy J | 4:35 |
| Total length: | | | | 20:05 (77:48) |

Re-issue
| No. | Title | Producer(s) | Length |
|---|---|---|---|
| 1. | "Most Known Unknown Hits" | DJ Paul; Juicy J | 1:27 |
| 2. | "Stay Fly" (featuring Young Buck, 8Ball & MJG) (Censored) | DJ Paul; Juicy J | 3:56 |
| 3. | "Roll with It" (featuring Project Pat) | DJ Paul; Juicy J | 3:02 |
| 4. | "Don't Violate" (featuring Project Pat) | DJ Paul; Juicy J | 3:49 |
| 5. | "Swervin" (featuring Mike Jones & Paul Wall) | DJ Paul; Juicy J | 4:18 |
| 6. | "Knock tha Black Off Yo Ass" (featuring Project Pat) | DJ Paul; Juicy J | 4:20 |
| 7. | "Poppin My Collar" (featuring Mr. Bigg & Project Pat) | DJ Paul; Juicy J | 2:57 |
| 8. | "Hard Hittaz" (featuring Boogiemane) | DJ Paul; Juicy J | 4:12 |
| 9. | "Side 2 Side" (featuring Kanye West & Project Pat) | DJ Paul; Juicy J | 3:34 |
| 10. | "Half on a Sack" | DJ Paul; Juicy J | 3:26 |
| 11. | "Skit" | DJ Paul; Juicy J | 0:26 |
| 12. | "When I Pull Up at the Club" (featuring Paul Wall & Mr. Bigg) | DJ Paul; Juicy J | 4:32 |
| 13. | "Pussy Got Ya Hooked" (featuring Remy Ma) | DJ Paul; Juicy J | 4:20 |
| 14. | "Don't Cha Get Mad" (featuring Lil Flip & Mr. Bigg) | DJ Paul; Juicy J | 3:23 |
| 15. | "Body Parts 3" (featuring Boogiemane, Frayser Boy, Lil Wyte, Chrome Korleone, Grandaddy Souf & Project Pat) | DJ Paul; Juicy J | 4:07 |
| 16. | "It's Hard out Here for a Pimp" (featuring Paula Campbell) | DJ Paul; Juicy J; Frayser Boy | 2:49 |
| 17. | "Stay Fly" (Still Fly Remix) (featuring Slim Thug, Trick Daddy & Project Pat) | DJ Paul; Juicy J | 3:51 |
| 18. | "Outro" | DJ Paul; Juicy J | 2:43 |
| 19. | "Got It 4 Sale" (featuring Chrome Korleone) | DJ Paul; Juicy J | 4:32 |
| 20. | "Let's Plan a Robbery" | DJ Paul; Juicy J | 3:06 |
| 21. | "Side 2 Side" (featuring Bow Wow & Project Pat) | DJ Paul; Juicy J | 3:35 |
| 22. | "Ain't Got Time for Gamez" | DJ Paul; Juicy J | 4:04 |
| Total length: | | | 76:29 |

== Charts ==
=== Weekly charts ===
| Chart (2005) | Peak position |
|---|---|
| US Billboard 200 | 3 |
| US Top R&B/Hip-Hop Albums (Billboard) | 1 |

=== Year-end charts ===
| Chart (2005) | Position |
|---|---|
| US Billboard 200 | 182 |
| US Top R&B/Hip-Hop Albums (Billboard) | 47 |

| Chart (2006) | Position |
|---|---|
| US Billboard 200 | 99 |
| US Top R&B/Hip-Hop Albums (Billboard) | 37 |

== Certifications ==
| Region | Certification | Certified units/sales |
|---|---|---|
| United States (RIAA) | Platinum | 1,000,000^{^} |
^{^} Shipments figures based on certification alone.
