= No Filter =

No Filter may refer to:

== Music ==
- No Filter Tour, Rolling Stones 2017
- No Filter tour, 2014 concert tour by Danity Kane
- No Filter (Lil Wyte and JellyRoll album)
- No Filter (Json album)
- No Filter 2, Lil Wyte and JellyRoll collaborative album
- "No Filter", song by Hit the Lights from Summer Bones 2015
- "No Filter", song by Chris Brown from Royalty

== Other ==
- No Filter (film), Chilean film with Paz Bascuñán
- No Filter: The Inside Story of Instagram, 2020 book by Sarah Frier
