= WWE United States Championship =

Men's professional wrestling championship

- The current WWE United States Championship belt with default side plates (2026–present)

Details
- Promotion: Jim Crockett Promotions (1974–1988); World Championship Wrestling (1988–2001); WWE (2001; 2003–present)
- Brand: SmackDown
- Date established: December 31, 1974
- Current champion: Trick Williams
- Date won: September 6, 2026

Other names
- NWA United States Heavyweight Championship (Mid-Atlantic) (1974–1981); NWA United States Heavyweight Championship (Undisputed) (1981–1991); WCW United States Heavyweight Championship (1991–2001); WCW United States Championship (2001); WWE United States Championship (2003–present)
Statistics
- First champion: Harley Race
- Most reigns: Ric Flair (6 reigns)
- Longest reign: Lex Luger (3rd reign, 523 days) (Note: 522 days as recognized by WWE.)
- Shortest reign: Steve Austin (2nd reign, 5 minutes)
- Oldest champion: Terry Funk (56 years, 84 days)
- Youngest champion: David Flair (20 years, 121 days)
- Heaviest champion: Big Show (500 lb (230 kg))
- Lightest champion: Kalisto (170 lb (77 kg))

The WWE United States Championship is a men's professional wrestling championship promoted by the American promotion WWE, defended on the SmackDown brand division. It is one of two secondary male championships for WWE's main roster, along with the WWE Intercontinental Championship on Raw. The current champion is Trick Williams, who is in his second reign. He won the title by defeating Baron Corbin at Sunday Night's Main Event on September 6, 2026.

The championship was established on December 31, 1974, as the version of the NWA United States Heavyweight Championship that was defended in Jim Crockett Promotions, and later assumed by World Championship Wrestling (WCW), which eventually seceded from the National Wrestling Alliance (NWA). Harley Race was the inaugural champion. After WCW was purchased by the then-World Wrestling Federation (WWF) in 2001, the then-WCW United States Championship was defended in the WWF until it was unified with the Intercontinental Championship at that year's Survivor Series. After the 2002 brand extension and the promotion being renamed WWE, the championship was reactivated as the WWE United States Championship in July 2003 as a secondary title of the SmackDown brand. The United States Championship has switched between brands over the years, usually as a result of the WWE Draft; the 2023 draft moved the title back to SmackDown.

Of WWE's currently active championships, the United States Championship is the only one that did not originate in the promotion. It is the second-oldest active title in the company, behind the WWE Championship (1963), but the third longest-tenured championship, behind the WWE and Intercontinental Championships (1979), as WWE has only owned the United States Championship since 2001. It has been described as a "stepping stone" to a world championship.

== History ==
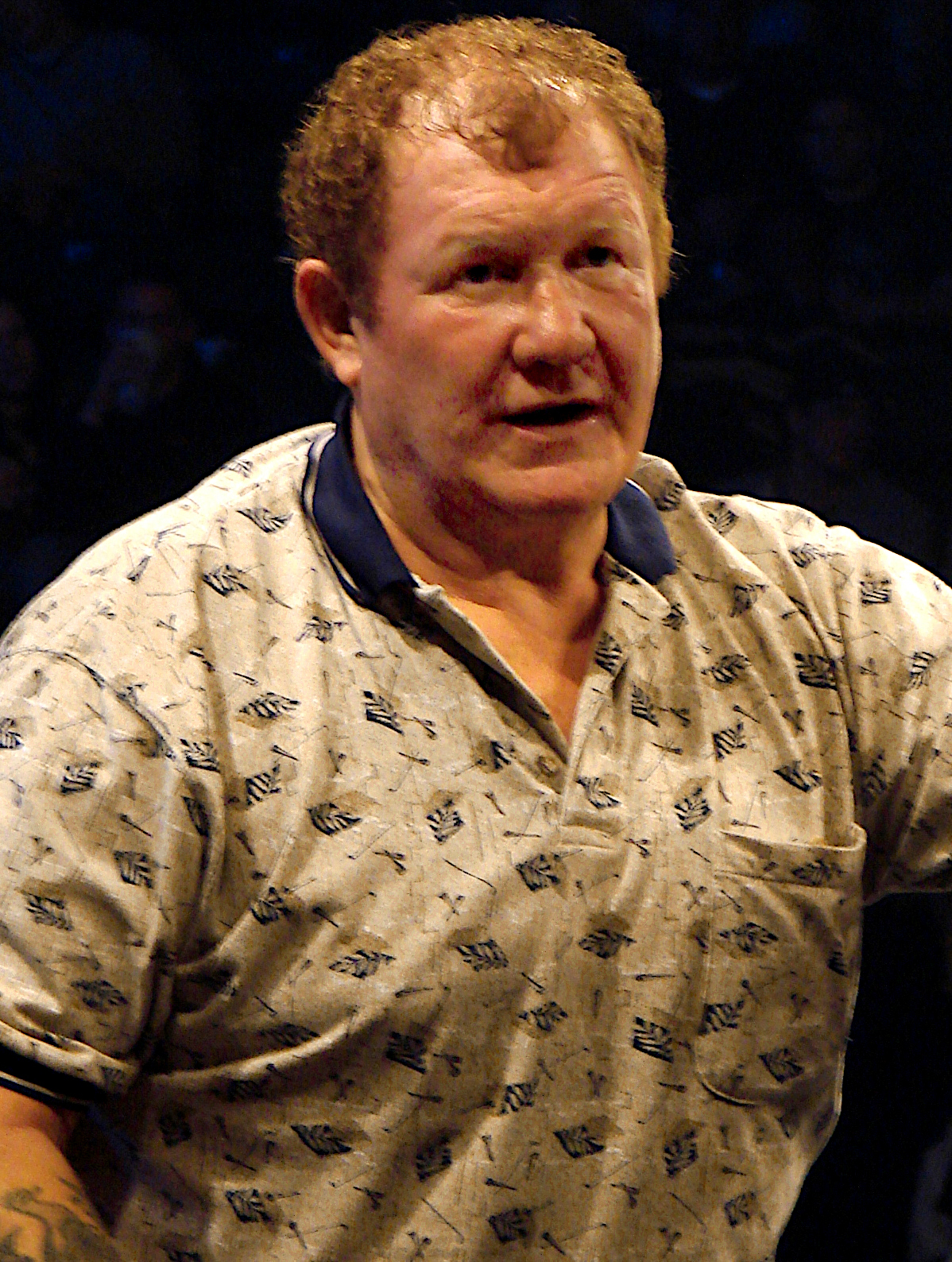
Harley Race, the inaugural champion

The United States Championship began as a regional championship called the NWA United States Heavyweight Championship, one of several versions of the title allowed in different territories under the National Wrestling Alliance (NWA) bylaws. It was created by and defended in Mid-Atlantic Championship Wrestling (MACW) run by Jim Crockett Jr. Introduced on December 31, 1974, Harley Race became the inaugural champion. The title quickly surpassed the NWA Mid-Atlantic Heavyweight Championship as the top singles title in the promotion. While the NWA recognized only one World Heavyweight Champion, there was no single undisputed United States Champion, as a number of NWA regional promotions recognized their own version of the title and champion. That changed, however, in January 1981; San Francisco-based NWA territory Big Time Wrestling, which was the last remaining promotion outside the Mid-Atlantic territory that recognized its own United States Champion, ceased operations around that time, leaving the Mid-Atlantic version as the only remaining United States Championship.

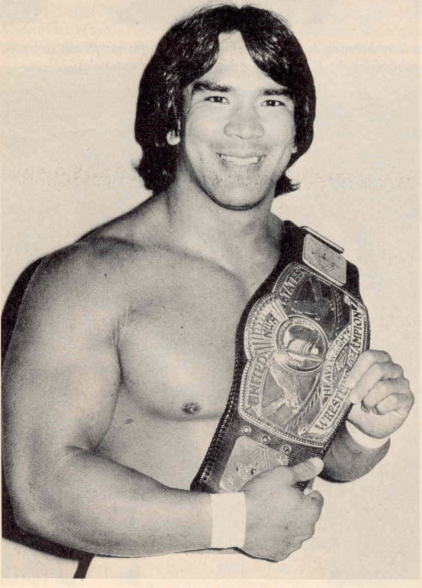
Ricky Steamboat as the NWA United States Heavyweight Champion, circa 1985

The title remained the primary championship within the Mid-Atlantic territory until 1986 when Crockett gained control of the NWA World Heavyweight Championship. The United States title then became the secondary championship of the promotion. After Ted Turner bought the company and renamed it World Championship Wrestling (WCW) in November 1988, the title continued to be used and recognized as secondary to the World Championship. WCW began to pull itself away from the NWA, demonstrated by the company changing the name of the title to the WCW United States Heavyweight Championship in January 1991.

On the April 6, 1991, episode of World Championship Wrestling, Nikita Koloff destroyed the classic 1980s United States Heavyweight Championship belt during a post-match brawl with Lex Luger, who was in his fourth reign as champion. Koloff, who claimed to be the true champion, knocked Luger unconscious by striking him with the title belt and then repeatedly smashed the championship belt into a ringpost. Luger would appear without a physical championship belt, and later became the first to wear a newly designed belt, which was used up through WCW's closing in March 2001, after being purchased by rival promotion, the then-World Wrestling Federation (WWF).

Chris Kanyon as WCW United States Champion in 2001

When WWF purchased WCW, they used the United States title during the WWF's Invasion storyline. The title was deactivated after being unified with the then-WWF Intercontinental Championship at that year's Survivor Series, when United States Champion Edge defeated Intercontinental Champion Test, becoming the new Intercontinental Champion. In July 2003, a year after the first brand extension went into effect in the promotion renamed World Wrestling Entertainment (WWE), the title was reactivated as the WWE United States Championship by then-SmackDown! General Manager Stephanie McMahon and with a completely new belt design. It was commissioned to be a secondary championship for the SmackDown! brand, making the championship the only one from WCW to be reactivated as a WWE title (although the WCW Cruiserweight Championship had also become a WWE title, it was not deactivated and reactivated; it replaced the WWF Light Heavyweight Championship during the Invasion storyline). Eddie Guerrero became the first champion after its reactivation by winning a tournament at that year's Vengeance, defeating Chris Benoit in the final match. This was done shortly after the Intercontinental Championship was recommissioned by the Raw brand, making the title its equal counterpart. The first brand extension ended on August 29, 2011, allowing the United States Championship, as well as all other titles, to be defended on both Raw and SmackDown.

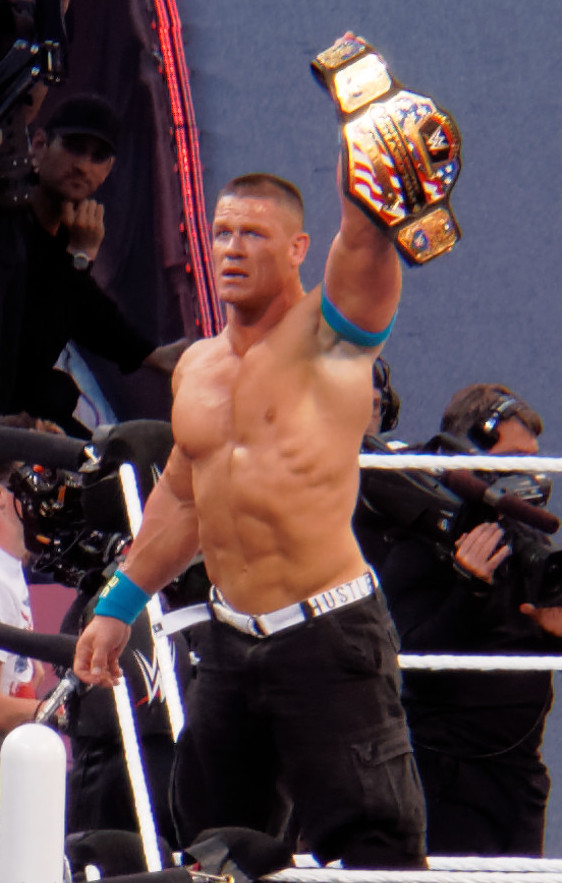
John Cena after defeating Rusev for the United States Championship at WrestleMania 31

In 2015, WWE introduced an updated version of its Grand Slam Championship, and the United States Championship became officially recognized as a component of the re-established honor. In August at that year's SummerSlam, United States Champion John Cena faced WWE World Heavyweight Champion Seth Rollins in a Winner Takes All match, which Rollins ultimately won to become the first wrestler to hold the WWE World Heavyweight Championship and United States Championship simultaneously. Rollins held both titles until Cena defeated Rollins in his rematch for the title at Night of Champions the following month.

In July 2016, WWE reintroduced the brand extension; during the draft, reigning United States Champion Rusev was drafted to the Raw brand. Days later, he successfully defended the title against SmackDown draftee Zack Ryder at Battleground, keeping the title exclusive to Raw. On April 11, 2017, United States Champion Kevin Owens, along with the title, moved to SmackDown as a result of that year's Superstar Shake-up. Owens was already scheduled to defend the title against Chris Jericho at the Raw-exclusive pay-per-view Payback on April 30. Then-SmackDown General Manager Daniel Bryan declared that regardless of who won at Payback, the United States Championship would remain on SmackDown; Jericho defeated Owens for the title at Payback and he transferred to SmackDown. During the 2018 Superstar Shake-up, the title briefly returned to Raw when champion Jinder Mahal was drafted to the brand; however, it was immediately returned to SmackDown after Jeff Hardy defeated Mahal for the title and was drafted to SmackDown the next night. The championship returned to Raw in 2019 when reigning champion Samoa Joe was drafted to the brand during that year's Superstar Shake-up. After four years, the title moved back to SmackDown as a result of reigning champion Austin Theory being drafted to the brand in the 2023 draft.

== Belt design ==
With the exception of the WWE logo update that occurred in 2014, this design of the championship belt was used from when the title was reactivated in 2003 until it was replaced with a completely new design in 2020, making it one of the longest used championship designs in WWE.

The design of the WCW United States Heavyweight Championship from 1991 to 1995 featured five plates. A center plate on the gold background consisted of a map of the Contiguous United States with a flag shown along with an eagle. The top of the plate had the WCW logo with the two banners reading on a black background "UNITED STATES" along with two stars on each side while the text said "HEAVYWEIGHT WRESTLING CHAMPION" on the bottom. The inner side plates had the U.S. flag with the text "UNITED STATES" while the outer side plates showed two wrestlers grappling with the WCW logo on top and the text "CHAMPION" on the bottom. After its minor update in 1995, the belt then featured three plates with the center plate slightly redesigned with the side plates also featuring a gold filigree with the text "WORLD CHAMPIONSHIP WRESTLING". This belt would also appear on WWF's programming until November 2001.

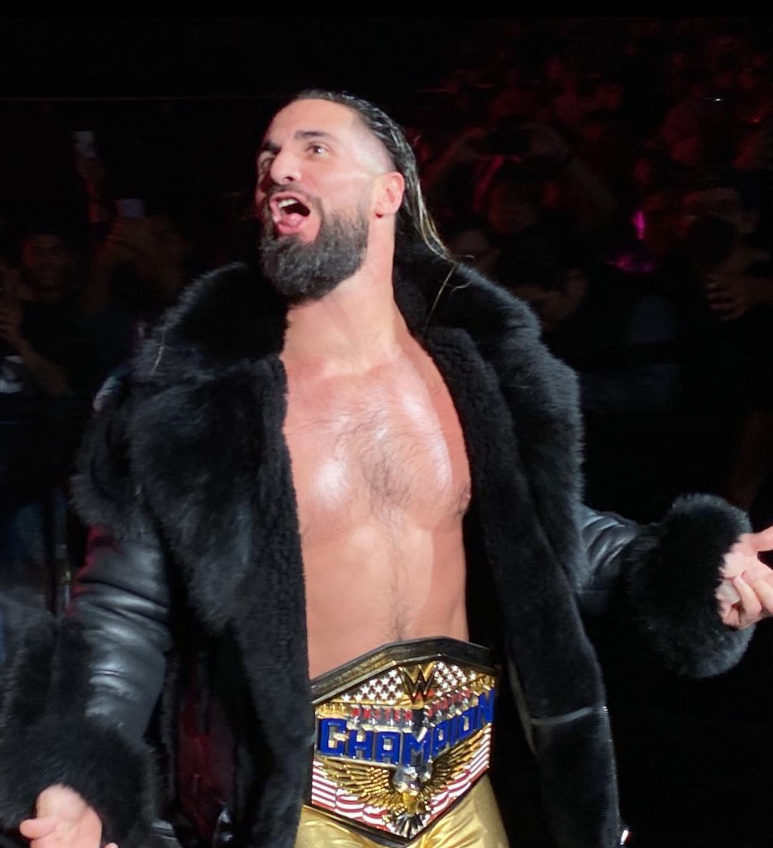
Two-time champion Seth Rollins with the championship belt introduced in 2020; this version received a minor update in 2026 by adding a blue background behind the stars at the top of the plate.

After its reactivation in July 2003, the newly renamed WWE United States Championship was redesigned. This belt consisted of five plates. The center plate featured a heptagon with an enlarged U.S. flag along with the company's scratch logo located at the top of the main plate in white and black paint. Below the logo was a gold banner with the words "WORLD WRESTLING ENTERTAINMENT" etched inside. In the center of the main plate was a black banner with the words "UNITED STATES CHAMPION" etched in gold. On the bottom of the center plate was a name plate to display the reigning champion's name. The inner side plates featured a light etching of an American bald eagle resting on top of a shield with the WWE logo painted white and red within the shield with an eagle holding a red and white striped banner as well as blue-painted square with a white star at the center placed above the eagle. The outer side plates featured a portrait of the Statue of Liberty surrounded by four stars on each corner. In August 2014, the United States Championship belt, along with all other pre-existing championship belts in WWE at the time, received a minor update, replacing the long-standing scratch logo with WWE's current logo that was originally used for the WWE Network that launched earlier that year in February.

On the July 6, 2020, episode of Raw, 17 years after the title's reactivation, MVP introduced a completely new belt design for the WWE United States Championship similar to the NWA United States Championship and WCW United States Championship 1985 to 1991 and 1991 to 1995 versions. The belt now features only three plates. The center plate is an upside down heptagon. The top portion of the center plate features the WWE logo flanked by white stars on a gold background. Below this, "UNITED STATES" is written in red, with "CHAMPION" prominently written below that in blue; eight stars divide the two. Below the word champion is an eagle with its wings spread out across the plate, with the red and white stripes of the American flag beneath its wings. Coming in line with WWE's other championship belts, the belt features two side plates with a removable center section that can be customized with the champion's logos; the default side plates consist of a gold WWE logo over a silver globe. In September 2026, this design got a minor update by adding a blue background behind the stars at the top of the plate, which was first seen on Trick Williams's custom belt from July.

=== Custom designs ===
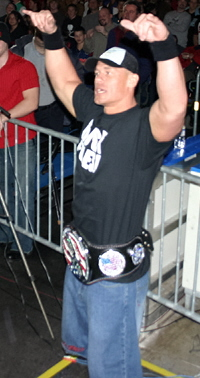
John Cena with his custom spinner belt in 2005.

- In 2000, Lance Storm won the title and unofficially renamed it as the WCW Canadian Heavyweight Championship, complete with large Canadian flag stickers that covered the belt's faceplates.
- Throughout John Cena's reign in 2004 and 2005, a custom spinner belt was used during his championship run to fit his hip-hop persona at that time. The center plate was a circular disc that spun and was painted like the American flag. It prominently had the letters "US" at the center, emblazoned with diamonds. Above the US letters was Cena's catchphrase "Word Life" while below said "John Cena", both in cursive text. The silver border around the spinning area said "Champion" at the bottom in blue with WWE's scratch logo affixed at the top. The two inner side plates simply featured the American flag while the outer side plates had a star. One additional side plate on the far right had the WWE scratch logo.
- During LA Knight's reigns in October 2024 and March 2025, he introduced his own custom version, which had the same design as the standard belt, but featured his "LA" logo in white all along the black strap.
- In July 2026, reigning champion Trick Williams was gifted a custom design by rapper and his manager Lil Yachty. It had the same overall design as the standard belt, but the strap was covered in white fur to match Williams's signature white fur coat. The main plate also received a minor update with a blue background behind the stars at the top of the plate, which was subsequently incorporated into the standard belt.

== Brand designation history ==
Following the revival of the United States Championship in 2003, the title was designated to SmackDown. The brand extension was discontinued on August 29, 2011, but it was revived on July 19, 2016. The following list indicates the transitions of the United States Championship between the Raw, SmackDown, and ECW brands.

Date of transition	Brand	Notes
July 27, 2003	SmackDown!	The retired WCW United States Championship was reactivated as the WWE United States Championship to be SmackDown!'s secondary title and the counterpart to Raw's Intercontinental Championship.
June 23, 2008	ECW	United States Champion Matt Hardy was drafted to ECW in the 2008 WWE Draft.
July 20, 2008	SmackDown	The United States Championship was returned to SmackDown after SmackDown's Shelton Benjamin defeated the previous champion ECW's Matt Hardy to win the United States Championship.
April 13, 2009	Raw	United States Champion Montel Vontavious Porter was drafted to Raw in the 2009 WWE Draft.
April 26, 2011	SmackDown	United States Champion Sheamus was drafted to SmackDown in the 2011 WWE Draft.
May 1, 2011	Raw	The United States Championship was returned to Raw after Raw's Kofi Kingston defeated SmackDown's Sheamus to win the United States Championship.
August 29, 2011	—N/a	End of first brand extension.; The United States Champion could appear on both Raw and SmackDown.
July 19, 2016	Raw	The reintroduction of the brand extension.; United States Champion Rusev was drafted to Raw in the 2016 WWE Draft.
April 11, 2017	SmackDown	United States Champion Kevin Owens was drafted to SmackDown in the 2017 WWE Superstar Shake-up.
April 16, 2018	Raw	United States Champion Jinder Mahal was drafted to Raw on night one of the 2018 WWE Superstar Shake-up.
April 17, 2018	SmackDown	The United States Championship was returned to SmackDown after SmackDown's Jeff Hardy, who had defeated Raw's Jinder Mahal to win the title, was drafted to SmackDown on night two of the 2018 WWE Superstar Shake-up.
April 22, 2019	Raw	United States Champion Samoa Joe was drafted to Raw in the 2019 WWE Superstar Shake-up.
May 8, 2023	SmackDown	United States Champion Austin Theory was drafted to SmackDown in the 2023 WWE Draft.

== Tournaments ==
=== WWE United States Championship Tournament (2003) ===
The tournament for the vacant WWE United States Championship was held between June 19 and July 27, 2003, for the SmackDown! brand.

Tournament bracket

1st Round; SmackDown; June 17 – July 8, 2003 (Aired: June 19 – July 10)
Chris Benoit	Submission
Rhyno	16:22
Matt Hardy	Pinfall
Rikishi	4:05
Billy Gunn	Pinfall
John Cena	5:53
Eddie Guerrero	Pinfall
Último Dragón	3:22

Semifinals; SmackDown; July 13, 2003 (Aired: July 17)
Chris Benoit	Submission
Matt Hardy	7:27
Billy Gunn	8:28
Eddie Guerrero	Pinfall

Final; Vengeance; July 27, 2003
Chris Benoit	21:54
Eddie Guerrero	Pinfall

=== WWE United States Championship Tournament (2017–18) ===
At Clash of Champions 2017, Dolph Ziggler won the United States Championship by defeating defending champion Baron Corbin and Bobby Roode in a triple threat match. On the following episode of SmackDown Live, after recapping all of his previous accolades, Ziggler said that the WWE Universe did not deserve him and he dropped the title in the ring and left. After unsuccessful attempts at contacting Ziggler, SmackDown General Manager Daniel Bryan declared the title vacant and announced a tournament to crown a new champion. The final was originally scheduled to occur at the 2018 Royal Rumble, but was moved up to the January 23 episode of SmackDown Live. However, on the January 16 episode, after Jinder Mahal and Bobby Roode won their respective semifinals matches, Roode challenged Mahal to have the final that night and Bryan scheduled it for that episode's main event.

Tournament bracket

First Round; SmackDown Live; December 26, 2017 – January 9, 2018
Bobby Roode	Pinfall
Baron Corbin	10:44
Zack Ryder	5:44
Mojo Rawley	Pinfall
Tye Dillinger	8:41
Jinder Mahal	Pinfall
Xavier Woods	Pinfall
Aiden English	7:31

Semifinals; SmackDown Live; January 16, 2018
Bobby Roode	Pinfall
Mojo Rawley	13:41
Jinder Mahal	Pinfall
Xavier Woods	16:33

Final; SmackDown Live; January 16, 2018
Bobby Roode	Pinfall
Jinder Mahal	14:49

== Reigns ==
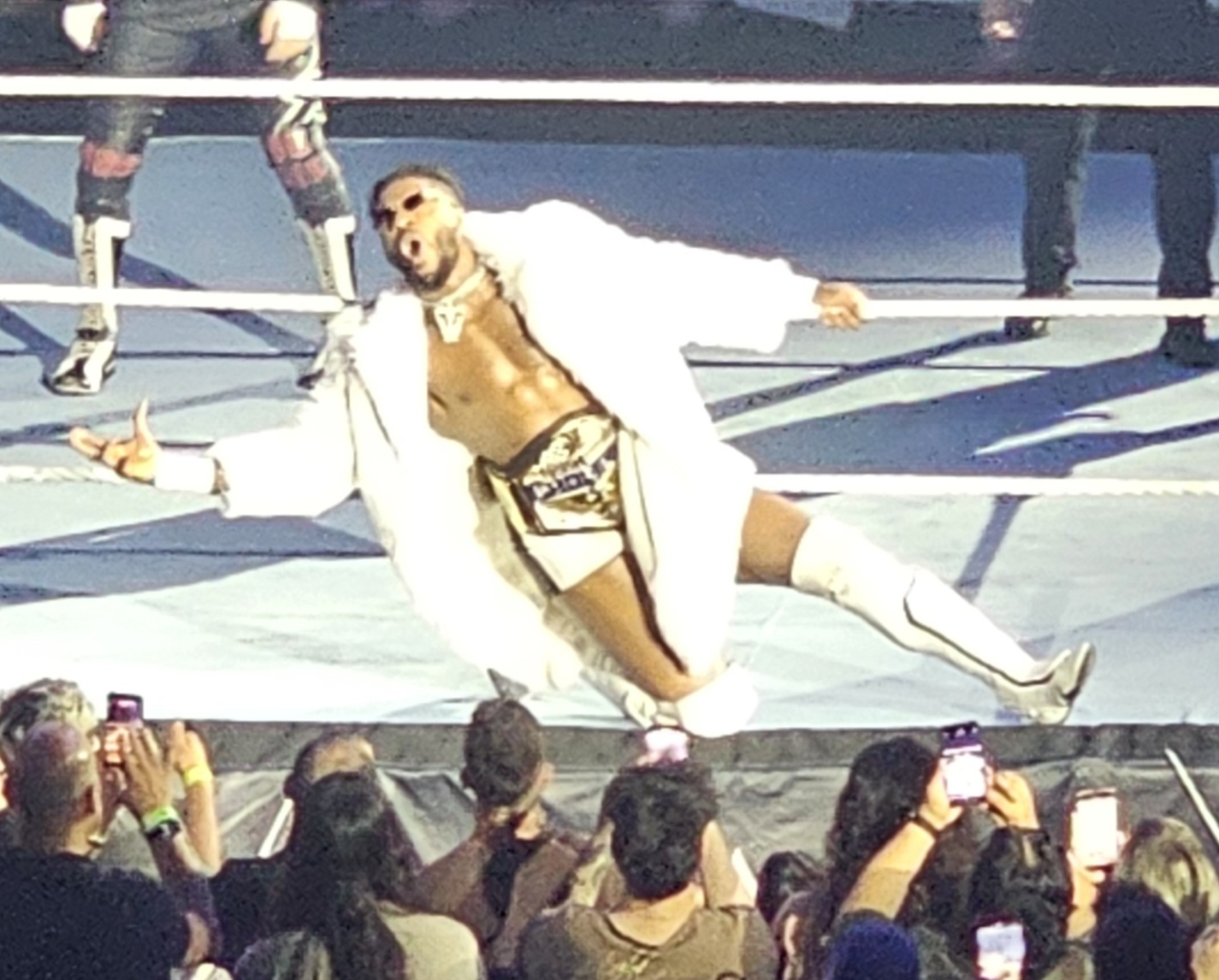
Current and two-time champion Trick Williams

The inaugural champion was Harley Race. There have been 191 reigns among 109 different champions, with Ric Flair having the most reigns at six. The longest-reigning champion is Lex Luger, who held the title for 523 days from May 22, 1989, to October 27, 1990. "Stunning" Steve Austin's second reign was the shortest, lasting approximately five minutes. Dean Ambrose is the longest-reigning champion under the WWE banner at 351 days, lasting from May 19, 2013, to May 5, 2014. Booker T and Seth Rollins are the only two men to have held both the United States Championship and a world championship simultaneously; in Booker T's case, the world title was the WCW World Heavyweight Championship, while Rollins held the WWE World Heavyweight Championship (both Lex Luger and Goldberg were the United States Champion when they won their first world championship, but unlike Booker T and Rollins, they vacated the United States Championship after winning their world championships). Terry Funk is the oldest champion in the title's history, winning the title at the age of 56 on September 22, 2000, while David Flair is the youngest at the age of 20 on July 5, 1999. Between NWA/WCW and WWE, the title has been vacated 21 times. Only two men have held the title for a continuous reign of one year (365 days) or more: Lex Luger and Rick Rude. Eddie Guerrero, Bret Hart, Chris Benoit, and Booker T are the only wrestlers to have held the championship in both its WCW and WWE incarnations.

Trick Williams is the current champion in his second reign. He won the title by defeating Baron Corbin at Sunday Night's Main Event on September 6, 2026, in Atlanta, Georgia.

== See also ==
- WWE Women's United States Championship
- WWWF United States Tag Team Championship
