= B.A.R. (Bay Area Representatives) =

Studio album by Lil Wyte and Frayser Boy
- Released: February 4, 2014
- Recorded: 2013
- Genre: Southern hip-hop
- Length: 46:54
- Label: Phixieous Entertainment
- Producer: Thomas "Stoner" Toner (exec.); Wes Phillips (exec.); Lil Wyte (exec.); Frayser Boy (exec.); Big Boi Beats; Dream Drumz; GezinBeats; Greenway; Lil Lody; Limit Beats; Shawn Mattison; The Colleagues

Lil Wyte chronology
No Filter (2013)	B.A.R. (Bay Area Representatives) (2014)	No Sick Days (2014)

Frayser Boy chronology
Da Key (2008)	B.A.R. (Bay Area Representatives) (2014)	Not No Moe (2014)

B.A.R. (Bay Area Representatives) is a collaborative studio album by American rappers Lil Wyte and Frayser Boy. It was released on February 4, 2014 via Phixieous Entertainment.

== Background ==
The album was first mentioned on Lil Wytes album Phinally Phamous on the song "Big Ass Guns" back in 2004. Not much was known about it except that it was a collaboration album by Lil Wyte and Frayser boy and that it was previously said to be released sometime in 2005. The album never materialized though and wasn't mentioned again until 2012. On January 24, 2012, Lil Wyte posted on Twitter that he and Frayser Boy were starting work on B.A.R. Though nothing else was said about it afterwards, later on in 2013 August after releasing No Filter with JellyRoll the idea resurfaced on Twitter after Lil Wyte confirmed his new solo album No Sick Days and his album with Frayser Boy having the same title as it originally had. On the 10th of October they pre-released their first song from the album called "Moment Of Truth". On October 24, Frayser Boy confirmed that the album would be released in November though on November 19, Lil Wyte confirmed that the album is finished and it would be released in January. On November 25, Lil Wyte posted a snippet of a track from the album on Facebook called "Fake Rappers". On the 3rd of December Lil Wyte confirmed that the release date of the album is January 21. On December 7, Lil Wyte uploaded part of the album's track list on instagram. The album cover was revealed on the 9th of December. On December 24, Lil Wyte confirmed on Facebook that the release date was pushed back to February 4. On January 1, 2014, a video was released for "Moment Of Truth".

== Production and guests ==
Producers on the album include Greenway, Big Boi Beats, Gezin Beats, Limit Beats, The Colleagues and Lil' Lody. Guests on the album include Gangsta Boo, JellyRoll, La Chat, Miscellaneous, MJG and Thug Therapy. Guest rappers were confirmed by Lil Wyte on Twitter.

== Track listing ==
No.	Title	Producer(s)	Length
1.	"Never Left"	The Colleagues	3:15
2.	"Bout to Be a Fight" (featuring Gangsta Boo)	Limit Beats	4:08
3.	"Call From tha Dope Mane" (Skit)	Antoine "Lil Lody" Kearney	1:01
4.	"M.P.W.L." (featuring Thug Therapy)	Antoine "Lil Lody" Kearney	4:20
5.	"Come On Let's Go" (featuring MJG)	Jonah "Matic Lee" Appleby	3:50
6.	"Fake Rappers"	Dream Drumz	5:15
7.	"Outside the Shake Junt" (Skit)	Jonah "Matic Lee" Appleby	0:39
8.	"Six O'Clock" (featuring JellyRoll)	Jonah "Matic Lee" Appleby	4:18
9.	"They Don't Like That"	Antoine "Lil Lody" Kearney	3:13
10.	"Can't Even Lie" (featuring Miscellaneous)	Gezin Beats; Dream Drumz	4:21
11.	"Hard to Find"	Shawn Mattison	3:12
12.	"What's Street" (featuring La Chat)	Limit Beats	4:14
13.	"Like Me"	Donye	3:03
14.	"Lil Wyte Speaks" (Outro)	Greenway	2:17
Total length:			46:54

Non album track

- "Moment of Truth"

Notes

- "Moment of Truth" contains samples of "Moment of Truth", as performed by Willie Tee.
- "Come On Let's Go" features uncredited vocals by Gangsta Boo.

== Charts ==
Chart (2014)	Peak position
US Top R&B/Hip-Hop Albums (Billboard)	46
US Independent Albums (Billboard)	23
