= Who Run It =

Single by Three 6 Mafia

from the album When the Smoke Clears: Sixty 6, Sixty 1 and Three 6 Mafia Presents: Hypnotize Camp Posse
- Released: January 24, 2000
- Recorded: 1999
- Studio: Hypnotize Minds
- Genre: Hip-hop
- Length: 4:11
- Label: Loud
- Songwriters: Paul Beauregard, Darnell Carlton, Robert Cooper, Ricky Dunigan, Jordan Houston, Lola Mitchell
- Producers: DJ Paul, Juicy J

Three 6 Mafia singles chronology
"Late Nite Tip" (1997)	"Who Run It" (2000)	"Sippin' on Some Syrup" (2000)

"Who Run It" is a song by hip-hop group Three 6 Mafia, released as the lead single from their fourth studio album When the Smoke Clears: Sixty 6, Sixty 1. The song is a posse cut, featuring a verse from every group member. The song peaked at number 12 on the Bubbling Under R&B/Hip-Hop Singles chart.

== Background ==
The song originally had a different instrumental; Three 6 Mafia member DJ Paul stated that the original had "keys and scary music in it", but remixed the beat one night. He played the new version on the group's tour bus to an overwhelmingly positive reception. The track on Hypnotize Camp Posse has more instrumental after the final verse, which makes it slightly longer than the one on When the Smoke Clears: Sixty 6, Sixty 1.

== Music video ==
The music video for the single features the group rapping in a Cadillac Escalade and driving around Memphis, as each member is introduced along with their respective verse. Juicy J states that the group was "high as hell" during filming, and feared that he would fall off of the car.

== Remixes ==
On March 16, 2018, G Herbo made an appearance on the K-104 radio station, and freestyled over the "Who Run It" instrumental. The freestyle soon went viral, and G Herbo released a full remix of the song on March 22, at the request of Drake. It has since inspired a popular freestyle challenge, spawning remixes from several rappers including ASAP Rocky, 21 Savage, Chief Keef, Cupcakke, Dave East, Lil Uzi Vert, Lil Yachty, Trippie Redd, and Young M.A. Original Three 6 Mafia members DJ Paul and Juicy J also released their own remixes.
