= Da Key =

Studio album by Frayser Boy
- Released: May 20, 2008
- Recorded: 2008
- Genre: Southern hip-hop; gangsta rap
- Label: Hypnotize Minds
- Producer: DJ Paul; Juicy J

Frayser Boy chronology
Me Being Me (2005)	Da Key (2008)	B.A.R. (Bay Area Representatives) (2014)

Da Key is the third studio album by American rapper Frayser Boy. It was released on May 20, 2008, via Hypnotize Minds, with distribution from Select-O-Hits. The album was named Da Key after Frayser Boy won an Academy Award for co-writing the song "It's Hard out Here for a Pimp" for the film Hustle & Flow, for which he was jointly presented with the Key to the City of Memphis, Tennessee.

The album was recorded in only three days in early 2008. In a 2022 interview, Frayser Boy himself admitted the album was rushed.

== Track listing ==
No.	Title	Length
1.	"Intro"	1:12
2.	"Big Money" (featuring DJ Paul)	3:17
3.	"Hood Thang"	3:34
4.	"How Nigga"	3:17
5.	"What We Smoke, What We Pop"	3:11
6.	"How I Came Up"	3:43
7.	"Twerk Dat Thang"	3:06
8.	"100 Or Nothing"	3:28
9.	"DXS Talk" (Skit)	0:45
10.	"Money Gettin' Mission" (featuring DJ Paul)	2:58
11.	"Hatin' On Me"	3:35
12.	"Blame It On Patron" (featuring Juicy J)	3:46
13.	"Come On Then"	2:51
14.	"Wanna See Me Fall"	2:52
15.	"Another Level"	3:06
16.	"Any Day, Any Time"	2:41
17.	"Outro"	2:02

== Personnel ==
- Cedric Coleman – main artist
- Paul Duane Beauregard – featured artist, producer
- Jordan Michael Houston – featured artist, producer
- Blake Franklin – artwork and design

== Chart history ==
Chart (2008)	Peak position
US Top R&B/Hip-Hop Albums (Billboard)	22
US Top Rap Albums (Billboard)	8
US Independent Albums (Billboard)	38
US Heatseekers Albums (Billboard)	13
