= Mista Don't Play: Everythangs Workin =

Studio album by Project Pat
- Released: February 27, 2001
- Recorded: 2000–2001
- Studio: Hypnotize Minds (Memphis, Tennessee)
- Genres: Southern hip-hop; gangsta rap
- Length: 1:13:45
- Labels: Hypnotize Minds; SRC; Loud; RED
- Producers: DJ Paul (also exec.); Juicy J (also exec.)

Project Pat chronology
Murderers & Robbers (2000)	Mista Don't Play: Everythangs Workin (2001)	Layin' da Smack Down (2002)

Singles from Mista Don't Play: Everythangs Workin
- 1. "Chickenhead" Released: December 19, 2000; 2. "Don't Save Her" Released: 2001

Professional ratings
Review scores
Source	Rating
AllMusic	2/5 stars
Robert Christgau	D+
Entertainment Weekly	B
NME	3.5/5 stars

Mista Don't Play: Everythangs Workin is the second studio album by American rapper Project Pat. It was released on February 27, 2001, via Loud, SRC, and Hypnotize Minds with distribution via RED. The recording sessions took place at Hypnotize Minds Studio in Memphis, Tennessee. The album was produced by DJ Paul and Juicy J. Music videos were produced for "Chickenhead" and "Don't Save Her". Over 10 years later, Project Pat released videos for "We Can Get Gangsta" and "Gorilla Pimp".

The album peaked at number 4 on the Billboard 200 in the United States, and was certified Gold by the Recording Industry Association of America on March 29, 2001.

== Track listing ==
All music is composed by DJ Paul and Juicy J.

No.	Title	Length
1.	"Chickenhead" (featuring Three 6 Mafia and La Chat)	4:13
2.	"Out There Part 2 (Skit)"	0:48
3.	"Cheese and Dope"	3:25
4.	"Whole Lotta Weed"	4:14
5.	"Don't Save Her" (featuring Crunchy Black)	4:20
6.	"If You Ain't from My Hood" (featuring DJ Paul and Juicy J)	4:56
7.	"Gorilla Pimp" (featuring Namond Lumpkin)	3:53
8.	"Break da Law 2001" (featuring Three 6 Mafia)	4:23
9.	"So Hi" (featuring Lord Infamous)	4:31
10.	"201 Phone Call (Skit)"	0:12
11.	"We Can Get Gangsta"	4:01
12.	"Ski Mask" (featuring Crunchy Black)	4:31
13.	"Life We Live" (featuring Namond Lumpkin and Edgar Fletcher)	4:15
14.	"Y'all Niggaz Ain't No Killaz, Y'all Niggaz Some Hoes" (additional vocals by La Chat)	3:07
15.	"Ooh Nuthin'"	3:52
16.	"We Ain't Scared Hoe"	4:15
17.	"Aggravated Robbery"	4:27
18.	"North North"	3:12
19.	"Fuckin' with the Best" (featuring Hypnotize Camp Posse)	5:23
20.	"Mission Impossible (Pt. 5 Million) (Outro)"	1:54
Total length:		1:13:45

== Charts ==
=== Weekly charts ===
Chart (2001)	Peak position
US Billboard 200	4
US Top R&B/Hip-Hop Albums (Billboard)	2
US Independent Albums (Billboard)	1

=== Year-end charts ===
Chart (2001)	Position
US Billboard 200	110
US Top R&B/Hip-Hop Albums (Billboard)	34

== Certifications ==
Region	Certification	Certified units/sales
United States (RIAA)	Gold	500,000^{^}
^{^} Shipments figures based on certification alone.
