= No Filter 2 =

Studio album by Lil Wyte and JellyRoll
- Released: November 18, 2016
- Recorded: 2016
- Genre: Southern hip-hop
- Length: 56:06
- Label: Bad Apple Inc.
- Producer: Thomas "Stoner" Toner; Phil Bogard; Sonny Paradise

Lil Wyte and JellyRoll chronology
| No Filter (2013) | No Filter 2 (2016) |

Lil Wyte chronology
| No Sick Days (2014) | No Filter 2 (2016) | Drugs (2017) |

JellyRoll chronology
| Sobriety Sucks (2016) | No Filter 2 (2016) | Addiction Kills (2017) |

No Filter 2 is the third collaborative studio album by American rappers Lil Wyte and JellyRoll. It was released on November 18, 2016 via Bad Apple Inc. Production was primarily handled by Thomas "Greenway" Toner a.k.a. T-Stoner, along with Phil Bogard and Sonny Paradise. It features guest appearances from Ace of Thug Therapy, Bernz of ¡Mayday!, B-Real, DJ Paul, Doobie, Insane Clown Posse, Jackie Chain, Madchild and Struggle Jennings. The album serves as a sequel to their 2013 album, No Filter.

The album peaked at number 47 on the Top R&B/Hip-Hop Albums chart in the United States.

Music videos were released for the songs: "Demons", "My Smoking Song" and "Bad Bitch".

== Track listing ==
| No. | Title | Length |
|---|---|---|
| 1. | "Demons" | 3:43 |
| 2. | "Problem With It" (featuring DJ Paul) | 4:20 |
| 3. | "My Smoking Song" (featuring B-Real) | 4:03 |
| 4. | "Zombie" (featuring Madchild & Insane Clown Posse) | 5:29 |
| 5. | "Bad Bxtch" (featuring Doobie) | 4:11 |
| 6. | "Wassup" | 3:56 |
| 7. | "All Day Long" (featuring Jackie Chain) | 4:24 |
| 8. | "Intermission" | 2:30 |
| 9. | "Feeling the Vibe" | 3:10 |
| 10. | "Seen Too Much" | 2:27 |
| 11. | "Left Behind" (featuring Struggle) | 3:38 |
| 12. | "Play No Games" (featuring Ace) | 3:35 |
| 13. | "Tennessee Rap" | 2:32 |
| 14. | "Fuck Up" (featuring Bernz) | 4:03 |
| 15. | "Pain" | 4:05 |
| Total length: | | 56:06 |

== Charts ==
| Chart (2016) | Peak position |
|---|---|
| US Top R&B/Hip-Hop Albums (Billboard) | 47 |
