= Stay Fly =

Single by Three 6 Mafia featuring Young Buck and 8Ball & MJG

from the album Most Known Unknown
- Released: July 7, 2005
- Recorded: 2004–2005
- Length: 3:56
- Label: Hypnotize Minds, Sony BMG, Columbia
- Songwriters: Jordan Houston; Darnell Carlton; Paul Beauregard; Premro Smith; Marlon Goodwin; David Brown; William Hutchinson
- Producers: DJ Paul, Juicy J

Three 6 Mafia singles chronology
| "Ridin' Spinners" (2003) | "Stay Fly" (2005) | "Poppin' My Collar" (2006) |

Alternative cover
- "Still Fly Remix" single cover

Music video
- "Three 6 Mafia - Stay Fly (Official Video)" on YouTube

"Stay Fly" is the first single from hip hop group Three 6 Mafia's 2005 album Most Known Unknown. The song peaked at number 13 on the Billboard Hot 100 to become the group's biggest hit. The track, which samples "Tell Me Why Has Our Love Turned Cold" by Willie Hutch, features fellow Memphis rap duo 8Ball & MJG and Young Buck, a member of G-Unit. The single helped propel Most Known Unknown to RIAA platinum status. The single itself achieved 2×-platinum RIAA certification status on December 11, 2006.

== Music video ==
The video features an appearance from newly recruited G-Unit member Spider Loc. Remix featured Southern rappers such as Slim Thug, Trick Daddy and Three 6 Mafia affiliate Project Pat (Juicy J, DJ Paul & Crunchy Black all return with new verses). The "Bay Area Remix" features E-40. The chopped and screwed version (done by Michael 5000 Watts) features part of the instrumental of "Pussy Got Ya Hooked".

== Controversy ==
Three 6 Mafia has previously rapped about the devil in its music before, such as on Mystic Stylez. Due to this, and the group's name being an allusion to the mark of the beast "666" in the Bible, there is a misconception that the song's sample of Willie Hutch's "Tell Me Why Has Our Love Turned Cold" says "Lucifer, you're my king, you're my father" instead of Hutch's simple vocalizations, "Doo-ba-da, Doo-ba-dee, Doo-ba-da-ba-dee"

== Charts ==
=== Weekly charts ===
| Chart (2005–2006) | Peak position |
|---|---|
| New Zealand (Recorded Music NZ) | 16 |
| Scottish Singles Sales (Official Charts) | 43 |
| UK Hip Hop/R&B (Official Charts) | 5 |
| UK Singles (Official Charts) | 33 |
| US Billboard Hot 100 | 13 |
| US Hot R&B/Hip-Hop Songs (Billboard) | 9 |
| US Hot Rap Songs (Billboard) | 3 |
| US Pop Airplay (Billboard) | 23 |
| US Rhythmic Airplay (Billboard) | 4 |

=== Year-end charts ===
| Chart (2005) | Position |
|---|---|
| US Hot R&B/Hip-Hop Songs (Billboard) | 76 |
| Chart (2006) | Position |
| UK Urban (Music Week) | 26 |
| US Billboard Hot 100 | 92 |
| US Hot R&B/Hip-Hop Songs (Billboard) | 74 |

== Certifications ==
| Region | Certification | Certified units/sales |
|---|---|---|
| New Zealand (RMNZ) | Platinum | 30,000^{‡} |
| United States (RIAA) | Gold | 500,000^{^} |
| United States (RIAA) Mastertone | 2× Platinum | 2,000,000^{*} |
^{*} Sales figures based on certification alone.^{^} Shipments figures based on certification alone.^{‡} Sales+streaming figures based on certification alone.

== Release history ==
Release dates and formats for "Stay Fly"
| Region | Date | Format | Label(s) | Ref. |
|---|---|---|---|---|
| United States | October 18, 2005 | Mainstream airplay | Columbia | |
