= The One and Only (Lil Wyte album) =

The One & Only

Studio album by Lil Wyte
- Released: June 5, 2007
- Recorded: 2006–2007
- Genre: Memphis rap
- Length: 1:07:04
- Label: Hypnotize Minds; Asylum
- Producer: DJ Paul (also exec.); Juicy J (also exec.)

Lil Wyte chronology
Phinally Phamous (2004)	The One & Only (2007)	The Bad Influence (2009)

Professional ratings
Review scores
Source	Rating
RapReviews	6.5/10

The One and Only is the third solo studio album by American rapper Lil Wyte from Memphis. It was released on June 5, 2007 through Hypnotize Minds and Asylum Records. Production was handled entirely by DJ Paul and Juicy J. It features guest appearances from Project Pat, DJ Paul and Juicy J. The album debuted at number 46 on the Billboard 200.

== Track listing ==
No.	Title	Writer(s)	Length
1.	"The One and Only"	J. Houston; P. Beauregard; P. Lanshaw	1:58
2.	"We Ain't Kool"	J. Houston; P. Beauregard; P. Lanshaw; P. Houston	3:42
3.	"I Got Dat Candy"	J. Houston; P. Beauregard; P. Lanshaw; P. Slayton	3:27
4.	"That's What's Up"	J. Houston; P. Beauregard; P. Lanshaw	3:05
5.	"Talkin' Ain't Walkin'"	J. Houston; P. Beauregard; P. Lanshaw	4:09
6.	"Get High"	J. Houston; P. Beauregard; P. Lanshaw	3:44
7.	"It's On"	J. Houston; P. Beauregard; P. Lanshaw	3:59
8.	"Feelin' Real Pimpish" (featuring Project Pat)	J. Houston; P. Beauregard; P. Lanshaw; P. Houston	2:56
9.	"Get Wrong"	J. Houston; P. Beauregard; P. Lanshaw	3:18
10.	"Choppa on da Back Seat" (featuring Project Pat)	J. Houston; P. Beauregard; P. Lanshaw; P. Houston	3:19
11.	"Gettin' Money Boy"	J. Houston; P. Beauregard; P. Lanshaw; P. Houston	3:01
12.	"Cake"	J. Houston; P. Beauregard; P. Lanshaw; P. Houston	3:42
13.	"Got'm Lookin"	J. Houston; P. Beauregard; P. Lanshaw; P. Houston	3:16
14.	"Fucked Up"	J. Houston; P. Beauregard; P. Lanshaw	3:19
15.	"Suicide"	J. Houston; P. Beauregard; P. Lanshaw	4:04
16.	"Ghostin'"	J. Houston; P. Beauregard; P. Lanshaw	4:01
17.	"Do It Fluid"	J. Houston; P. Beauregard; P. Lanshaw	3:19
18.	"Dat Boy" (featuring Project Pat)	J. Houston; P. Beauregard; P. Lanshaw; P. Houston	2:50
19.	"Gun Do da Talkin'"	J. Houston; P. Beauregard; P. Lanshaw; P. Houston	3:14
20.	"Outro"	J. Houston; P. Beauregard	1:33
Total length:			1:07:04

== Charts ==
Chart (2007)	Peak position
US Billboard 200	46
US Top R&B/Hip-Hop Albums (Billboard)	10
US Top Rap Albums (Billboard)	3
US Indie Store Album Sales (Billboard)	15
