= Murderers & Robbers =

Compilation album by Project Pat
- Released: July 25, 2000
- Recorded: 1993–2000
- Genre: Hip-hop
- Length: 41:00
- Labels: Project Records, Street Level, LLC.
- Producers: DJ Paul; Juicy J

Project Pat chronology
Ghetty Green (1999)	Murderers & Robbers (2000)	Mista Don't Play: Everythangs Workin (2001)

Professional ratings
Review scores
Source	Rating
AllMusic	4.5/5 stars

Murderers & Robbers is the first compilation album by American rapper Project Pat. It was released on July 25, 2000, through Project Records with distribution via Street Level, LLC.. Labeled as an "underground album", it is mainly a compilation of the rapper's mixtape material from the 1990s before a prison sentence interrupted his career, similar to Three 6 Mafia's Underground series of compilation albums released from 1999 to 2000.

== Track listing ==
1. "Pimptro" - 0:30
2. "North, North" - 4:11
3. "I Get da Chewin" - 3:24
4. "Ridin on Chrome" (featuring T-Rock) - 4:11
5. "This Ain't No Game" (featuring S.O.G.) - 4:17
6. "Bitch Smackin Killa" (featuring Juicy J) - 4:08
7. "Murderers & Robbers" (featuring Lord Infamous and DJ Paul) - 5:05
8. "Red Rum" - 3:13
9. "Fuck a Bitch" (featuring Juicy J) - 4:35
10. "Easily Executed" - 3:14
11. "Puttin Hoez on da House" (featuring DJ Paul, Lord Infamous, Lil' Glock, and S.O.G.) - 3:23
12. "Outro" - 1:21

== Chart history ==
Chart (2000)	Peak position
US Top R&B/Hip-Hop Albums (Billboard)	45
