= Chickenhead (song) =

2000 single by Project Pat featuring Three 6 Mafia and La Chat

- 2022 digital reissue cover art

Single by Project Pat featuring Three 6 Mafia and La Chat

from the album Mista Don't Play: Everythangs Workin
- Released: 2000
- Genre: Southern hip-hop; crunk
- Length: 4:13
- Label: Loud; Hypnotize Minds; RED
- Songwriter(s): Patrick Houston; Paul Beauregard; Jordan Houston; Chastity Daniels; Derrick Ordogne; Todd Shaw
- Producer(s): DJ Paul; Juicy J

Project Pat singles chronology
"Sippin' on Some Syrup" (2000)	"Chickenhead" (2000)	"Don't Save Her" (2001)

Three 6 Mafia singles chronology
"Tongue Ring" / "Weak Azz Bitch" (2000)	"Chickenhead" (2000)	"2 Way Freak" (2001)

La Chat singles chronology
"Chickenhead" (2000)	"You Ain't Mad Iz Ya?" (2001)

Music video
- "Chickenhead" on YouTube

"Chickenhead" is a song by American rapper Project Pat, released on December 19, 2000 as the lead single from his second studio album Mista Don't Play: Everythangs Workin (2001). It features American hip hop group Three 6 Mafia and American rapper La Chat.

== Background ==
According to Project Pat, the song was inspired by him teasing a girl, who had slicked back hair with some gel and in a small bun, by poking his face in the back of her head and imitating a chicken. In an interview with Complex, Juicy J recalled some details of collaborating with Project Pat on the song:

I remember Project Pat came to me and he said man, I got this song called "Chickenheads," I was like, "How it go?" He was like, "Bok bok! Chicken chicken." I'm like, "What??" At first I was like, "What the hell?" You know what I'm saying? "Bok Bok"—what you just say man? He said, "Man, it's gonna be hot, it's gonna work." So I said, "Aite, cool." We recorded the song, me and Paul did the beat, and shit, the record company heard it and was like, man, this song is a SMASH. And the song blew up, man. We had a director, you know, I can't remember who directed that, I think it was Gil Green maybe. But whoever did it did a great job. We usually counted on the director to direct the videos and bring up the concepts and all that.

The song is considered to have led to La Chat gaining national attention due to her verse with Project Pat.

== Composition ==
The lyrics of the song serve as a warning to opportunistic women. The background features vocals in the form of clucking sounds.

== Charts ==
Chart (2001)	Peak position
US Billboard Hot 100	87
US Hot R&B/Hip-Hop Songs (Billboard)	24
US Hot Rap Songs (Billboard)	29
US Rhythmic (Billboard)	37
