= Doubt Me Now =

Studio album by Lil Wyte
- Released: March 4, 2003
- Recorded: 2002–2003
- Genre: Crunk; gangsta rap; hardcore hip-hop
- Length: 73:05
- Label: Hypnotize Minds
- Producer: DJ Paul; Juicy J; Carlos "Six July" Brody

Lil Wyte chronology
Doubt Me Now (2003)	Phinally Phamous (2004)

Chopped & Screwed cover

Professional ratings
Review scores
Source	Rating
AllMusic	3/5 stars

Doubt Me Now is the debut album by American rapper Lil Wyte, released March 4, 2003. The album became an underground hit among fans, selling over 135,000 copies independently, without any promotion.

A chopped and screwed remix of the album, produced by DJ Black, was released as Doubt Me Now: Surped Up and Screwed. The song "Ten Toes Tall" was originally from the album he made with Shelby Forest Click.

On the iTunes version of this album, the skits "Shit Faced" and "Don't Take Those" are not included, however "Death and Life" is still intact.

== Track listing ==
No.	Title	Length
1.	"Doubt Me Now"	2:46
2.	"Blame It On Da Bay"	3:08
3.	"We Ain't Playin'" (featuring DJ Paul)	4:37
4.	"Zero Tolerance"	2:26
5.	"Shit Faced (Skit)"	0:20
6.	"In Here"	4:16
7.	"Players In Da Atmosphere" (featuring DJ Paul & Juicy J)	4:04
8.	"My Smokin' Song"	3:38
9.	"I Know You Strapped"	3:19
10.	"Good Dope"	4:24
11.	"Com'n Yo Direction"	4:17
12.	"Oxy Cotton" (featuring Lord Infamous & Crunchy Black of Three 6 Mafia)	3:14
13.	"In the Streets"	4:33
14.	"Drop It Off"	4:31
15.	"Don't Take Those (Skit)"	0:29
16.	"Acid" (featuring Juicy J)	3:25
17.	"Crash Da Club" (featuring Juvenile)	4:10
18.	"Ten Toes Tall" (featuring DJ Paul)	4:43
19.	"Death & Life (Skit)"	0:36
20.	"Homicidal, Suicidal" (featuring Josey Scott & Chris D'Abaldo of Saliva)	3:01
21.	"Get High To This" (featuring Juicy J, DJ Paul, Crunchy Black, La Chat & Frayser Boy)	5:05
22.	"The Replacement (Outro)"	2:14
Total length:		73:05

== Credits ==
- All songs produced by DJ Paul & Juicy J.
