= Gone on That Bay =

Studio album by Frayser Boy
- Released: August 26, 2003
- Recorded: 2001–2003
- Genre: Southern hip-hop; gangsta rap
- Length: 1:13:50
- Label: Hypnotize Minds
- Producer: DJ Paul; Juicy J; Carlos "6 July" Broady

Frayser Boy chronology
Gone on That Bay (2003)	Me Being Me (2005)

Gone on That Bay is the debut studio album by American rapper Frayser Boy. It was released on August 26, 2003, via Hypnotize Minds. Audio production was handled by DJ Paul and Juicy J, who also guest appeared on the album together with Lil Wyte, Crunchy Black, Lord Infamous and UGK.

== Track listing ==
No.	Title	Length
1.	"Gone On That Bay" (Additional Vocals: DJ Paul and Juicy J)	2:28
2.	"Watchin' Me" (featuring DJ Paul)	2:57
3.	"Nan Notha'" (featuring DJ Paul & Juicy J)	4:26
4.	"Young Niggaz" (featuring Juicy J)	3:26
5.	"Bloody Murder" (Additional Vocals: Juicy J)	2:41
6.	"I'll Bring Da Weed" (Additional Vocals: DJ Paul)	2:43
7.	"Flickin'" (featuring DJ Paul & Juicy J)	4:41
8.	"Pistol Playa" (featuring Crunchy Black & DJ Paul)	3:14
9.	"I Had To Get'm" (Additional Vocals: Juicy J)	3:11
10.	"Bay Area" (featuring Lil Wyte and Additional Vocals: DJ Paul)	4:27
11.	"She Swallowed It" (Additional Vocals: Juicy J)	2:53
12.	"Ooh Wee"	2:56
13.	"Every Day Thang"	2:35
14.	"Niggaz Wild Throwin' Bows" (Additional Vocals: DJ Paul)	3:13
15.	"Walk A Mile"	4:12
16.	"Wish A Mutha Would" (Additional Vocals: La Chat)	3:38
17.	"Closed Mouth" (Additional Vocals: La Chat)	3:56
18.	"Hydro Weed" (Sample Vocals: Juicy J)	3:32
19.	"Chewin'" (featuring UGK)	2:56
20.	"Dog Azz Nigga"	3:55
21.	"H.C.P." (featuring DJ Paul, Crunchy Black, Juicy J, Lord Infamous & Lil Wyte)	4:37
22.	"Coming Attractions" (Outro)	1:13
Total length:		1:13:50

== Chart history ==
Chart (2003)	Peak position
US Billboard 200	178
US Top R&B/Hip-Hop Albums (Billboard)	23
US Independent Albums (Billboard)	9
US Heatseekers Albums (Billboard)	6
