= Underground Vol. 3: Kings of Memphis =

Kings of Memphis: Underground Vol. 3

Compilation album by Three 6 Mafia
- Released: October 31, 2000
- Recorded: 1991–2000
- Genre: Hip-hop
- Length: 1:07:13
- Label: Smoked Out
- Producer: DJ Paul; Juicy J

Three 6 Mafia chronology
When the Smoke Clears: Sixty 6, Sixty 1 (2000)	Kings of Memphis: Underground Vol. 3 (2000)	Choices: The Album (2001)

Professional ratings
Review scores
Source	Rating
AllMusic	2/5 stars

Underground Vol. 3: Kings of Memphis is the third compilation album by American hip-hop group Three 6 Mafia. It was released on October 31, 2000 through Smoked Out Music with distribution via Street Level LLC.

Produced by members DJ Paul and Juicy J, the album is composed of either previously unreleased songs from the early to mid-1990s or songs that didn't make the final cut for their When the Smoke Clears: Sixty 6, Sixty 1 album.

Serving as the third and final installment in Triple 6 Mafia's 'Underground' compilation series, it peaked at number 130 on the Billboard 200, number 28 on the Top R&B/Hip-Hop Albums and number 7 on the Independent Albums charts in the United States.

== Track listing ==
1. Talkin' (DJ Paul and Juicy J)
2. Fuck What U Heard (DJ Paul, Juicy J, Lord Infamous and Crunchy Black)
3. M.E.M.P.H.I.S. Part 2 (Remix) (DJ Paul, Juicy J, Project Pat, Lord Infamous, Crunchy Black, La Chat, Koopsta Knicca, T-Rock and MC Mack)
4. Da Summa (DJ Paul, Juicy J, Lord Infamous, Crunchy Black, Gangsta Boo and Koopsta Knicca)
5. Smokin on Da Dro (DJ Paul, La Chat, Lord Infamous, Juicy J and T-Rock)
6. Powder (higher version) (Lil E)
7. Grab Tha Gauge (DJ Paul, Juicy J, Lord Infamous and Gangsta Boo)
8. Wonabees (DJ Paul, Juicy J, Lord Infamous, Crunchy Black, Gangsta Boo and Project Pat)
9. Lock Down (DJ Paul, Juicy J, Lord Infamous and Gangsta Boo)
10. Jealous Azz Bitch (DJ Paul, Juicy J, Lord Infamous and Gangsta Boo)
11. Niggas Down 2 Make Endz (Lil E)
12. South Memphis Bitch (DJ Paul and Lord Infamous)
13. Pass That Junt (DJ Paul and Lord Infamous)
14. Love to Make a Stang (DJ Paul, Lord Infamous and Juicy J)
15. Sleep (DJ Paul, Juicy J, Lord Infamous, Crunchy Black, and Gangsta Boo)
16. Mindstate (DJ Paul, Juicy J, Lord Infamous, Crunchy Black, Gangsta Boo and Koopsta Knicca)

== Charts ==
Chart (2000)	Peak position
US Billboard 200	130
US Top R&B/Hip-Hop Albums (Billboard)	28
US Independent Albums (Billboard)	7
