= No Sick Days =

Studio album by Lil Wyte
- Released: April 20, 2014
- Recorded: 2013–2014
- Genre: Trap; gangsta rap
- Length: 46:16
- Label: Hypnotize Minds; Wyte; Select-O-Hits; Phixieous
- Producer: The Colleagues; T-Stoner; DJ Paul; Gezin Beats; Matic Lee; DJ Burn One; TTM Beats; lll Kronik; Austin Chillz; The Avengerz

Lil Wyte chronology
| B.A.R. (Bay Area Representatives) (2013) | No Sick Days (2014) | Best of WyteMusic Vol 1 With Partee (2016) |

No Sick Days is the 6th studio album by rapper Lil Wyte. The second album by him in 2014. It was released by Hypnotize Minds, Wyte Music, Select-O-Hits and Phixieous Entertainment.

== Background ==
Lil Wyte first mentioned the album a few weeks after releasing No Filter with JellyRoll confirming the title "No Sick Days". Lil Wyte released a VLOG on his YouTube channel on 6 March, in which he explains details about the album. He said that he has been recording the album for 6 months unlike No Filter and B.A.R. (Bay Area Representatives) which were recorded in a few weeks. He had to take a few breaks though because of his involvement in his mixtape Wyte Christmas IV on which he confirmed the release date, his collaboration album with Frayser Boy and the upcoming "Witch" album by Gangsta Boo and La Chat. Also he mentions that this is the first album in a long time where he made music he liked. He confirmed the producers and the featuring artists on the album. On March 3 he also uploaded a picture of the current track list that had 13 tracks though only four songs were readable due to the picture being blurred with the length of the songs being 46 minutes. On March 12 he released a picture of the complete track list with guests, that has 16 tracks on it, adding that he may add 1 or 2 more songs to it. On March 25 the album became available for Pre-Order on wytestore.com revealing an altered track list, with songs from the earlier track list ("Squirter" ft Gangsta Boo, "Knockin Heads" and "Seance") being replaced by different ones ("It's 4:20" and "No Sick Days") and the song "Never Been" retitled to "I'm a Hoe", also adding JellyRoll as a guest on "Ride It Like a Rental". It's currently unknown if the replaced tracks will be released or not.

== Production and guests ==
Confirmed producers on the album include The Colleagues, DJ Paul, Dream Drumz, Austin Chillz, The Avengerz, Shawneci, Gezin Beats, Matic Lee, DJ Burn One and T-Stoner. Confirmed guests on the album are La Chat, JellyRoll, Thug Therapy and Frayser Boy.

== Critical reception ==
Professional ratings
Review scores
| Source | Rating |
|---|---|
| Rapreviews.com | 6.5/10 stars |

Steve Flash Juon of Rapreviews gave the album a positive review calling it "a satisfying album - neither overwhelming nor underwhelming" also adding "I must admit that I'm relieved to find out "No Sick Days" is almost exactly what I expect from Wyte." and ending the review saying "The most important thing though is that Wyte does what he does exactly the way his supporters would want him to do it."

== Track listing ==
| No. | Title | Producer(s) | Length |
|---|---|---|---|
| 1. | "Fuck a Intro" | DJ Paul | 0:09 |
| 2. | "Mighty Mafia" | T-Stoner | 4:06 |
| 3. | "Three High" | TTM Beats | 2:53 |
| 4. | "House Party" | T-Stoner | 2:49 |
| 5. | "Run Up" (featuring La Chat) | Gezin Beats | 3:03 |
| 6. | "SJGR" | Austin Chillz | 3:06 |
| 7. | "Soon You'll Understand" | Matic Lee | 4:01 |
| 8. | "Can't Take No Mo" (featuring Ace) | The Avengerz | 3:02 |
| 9. | "M.O.E." (featuring Big E & Frayser Boy) | Ill Kronik | 4:10 |
| 10. | "I'm a Hoe" | T-Stoner | 3:35 |
| 11. | "Space" | Shawneci | 3:21 |
| 12. | "On These Rappers" | T-Stoner | 2:46 |
| 13. | "Ride It Like a Rental" (featuring JellyRoll) | The Colleagues & Yung Ced | 2:45 |
| 14. | "It's 4:20" | T-Stoner | 2:51 |
| 15. | "No Sick Days" | DJ Burn One | 3:39 |
