= The Bad Influence =

Studio album by Lil Wyte
- Released: August 25, 2009
- Recorded: 2009
- Studio: Hypnotize Minds Studio (Memphis, Tennessee)
- Genre: Southern hip-hop; crunk; gangsta rap
- Length: 47:10
- Label: Hypnotize Minds; Asylum
- Producer: DJ Paul; Juicy J

Lil Wyte chronology
The One and Only (2007)	The Bad Influence (2009)	Still Doubted? (2012)

Professional ratings
Review scores
Source	Rating
AllMusic	3.5/5 stars
HipHopDX	2/5
RapReviews	6.5/10

The Bad Influence is the fourth studio album by American rapper Lil Wyte from Memphis, Tennessee. It was released on August 25, 2009, via Hypnotize Minds/Asylum Records. Production was handled by DJ Paul and Juicy J. It features guest appearances from Project Pat, Juicy J and DJ Paul.

The album peaked at #104 on the Billboard 200, at #18 on Top R&B/Hip-Hop Albums, and #5 on the Top Rap Albums.

== Track listing ==
No.	Title	Length
1.	"Some Other Shit" (featuring DJ Paul & Project Pat)	3:19
2.	"All Stops"	3:24
3.	"I Say Yes" (featuring Project Pat)	2:55
4.	"Leanin' off Dat Yurple"	3:06
5.	"One Lil Pill"	3:12
6.	"I Rep Mine"	3:08
7.	"I'm Da Bad Influence"	3:29
8.	"Oxy Cotton" (featuring Juicy J & Project Pat)	3:44
9.	"Supply & Demand"	3:18
10.	"George Bush"	2:51
11.	"Get Gone"	3:05
12.	"So Called Homies"	3:21
13.	"That's What It Is" (featuring Project Pat)	3:13
14.	"Maria" (featuring Juicy J)	3:05
15.	"Outro"	2:00
Total length:		47:10

== Charts ==
Chart (2009)	Peak position
US Billboard 200	104
US Top R&B/Hip-Hop Albums (Billboard)	18
US Top Rap Albums (Billboard)	5
