= Me Being Me =

Studio album by Frayser Boy
- Released: July 12, 2005
- Recorded: 2004–2005
- Studio: Hypnotize Minds Studios (Memphis, Tennessee)
- Genre: Southern hip-hop; gangsta rap
- Length: 1:12:23
- Label: Hypnotize Minds; Asylum
- Producer: DJ Paul (also exec.); Juicy J (also exec.)

Frayser Boy chronology
Gone on That Bay (2003)	Me Being Me (2005)	Da Key (2008)

Singles from Me Being Me
- 1. "Got Dat Drank" Released: 2005

Professional ratings
Review scores
Source	Rating
AllMusic	3.5/5 stars
RapReviews	7/10

Me Being Me is a second studio album by American rapper Frayser Boy from Memphis, Tennessee. It was released on July 12, 2005 via Hypnotize Minds with manufacturing and distribution by Asylum. Production of the album was handled by DJ Paul and Juicy J. It features guest appearances from Hypnotize Camp Posse, Paul Wall and Mike Jones.

== Track listing ==
All music is composed by DJ Paul & Juicy J.

No.	Title	Length
1.	"Intro: Me Being Me" (featuring DJ Paul)	3:25
2.	"I Got Dat Drank" (featuring Paul Wall & Mike Jones)	4:14
3.	"Water" (featuring Lil Wyte)	4:30
4.	"Niggas in da Hood" (featuring Crunchy Black)	4:35
5.	"Stay Focused"	3:47
6.	"You Smell That"	3:12
7.	"It's da Summa Tyme" (featuring DJ Paul & Juicy J)	3:31
8.	"My Smokin Session" (featuring Boogie Mane)	3:58
9.	"Fuckem'" (featuring Project Pat)	4:37
10.	"Ain't Nothin' Changed"	2:45
11.	"Seen Thangs" (featuring Lord Infamous)	4:27
12.	"Get Knocked da Fuck Out" (featuring DJ Paul)	3:37
13.	"She Got Me Sayin Damn" (featuring Chrome & Juicy J)	4:04
14.	"Serious" (featuring Chrome & DJ Paul)	4:07
15.	"Ridin"	3:17
16.	"I'm a Problem"	3:39
17.	"If She a Hoe" (featuring Crunchy Black)	3:22
18.	"Posse Song" (featuring Lil Wyte, Lord Infamous, Juicy J, DJ Paul, Boogie Mane, Crunchy Black & Chrome)	4:43
19.	"Outro..."	3:23
Total length:		1:12:23

== Chart history ==
Chart (2005)	Peak position
US Billboard 200	124
US Top R&B/Hip-Hop Albums (Billboard)	24
US Top Rap Albums (Billboard)	15
US Heatseekers Albums (Billboard)	3
