= Poppin' My Collar =

Single by Three 6 Mafia

from the album Most Known Unknown
- Released: January 18, 2006
- Recorded: 2005
- Genre: Crunk; gangsta rap; Southern hip-hop
- Length: 2:54
- Label: Sony BMG, Columbia Records
- Songwriters: Paul Beauregard, Darnell Carlton, Jordan Houston, Willie M. Hutchinson, Donald Pears
- Producers: DJ Paul, Juicy J

Three 6 Mafia singles chronology
"Stay Fly" (2005)	"Poppin' My Collar" (2006)	"Side 2 Side" (2006)

Music video
- "Three 6 Mafia - Poppin' My Collar (Official Video) ft. Project Pat" on YouTube

"Poppin' My Collar" is the second single from Most Known Unknown, an album by hip hop group Three 6 Mafia. The song peaked at #21 on the Billboard Hot 100, becoming their second Top 40 hit. The track achieved RIAA platinum certification status on September 6, 2006.

The song featured vocals on the chorus from Alabama rapper The Last Mr. Bigg and contains a sample of "Theme of the Mack" by Willie Hutch.

The version in its music video is the remix featuring Project Pat. Kanye West makes a cameo appearance in the music video for the remix.

== Other versions ==
- Poppin' My Collar (Instrumentals)
- Poppin' My Collar (Chopped and Screwed)
- Poppin' My Collar (Video Version) (featuring Project Pat)
- Poppin' My Collar (Cracktracks Remix) (featuring Project Pat, DMX)
- Poppin' My Collar (Swizz Beatz Remix) (featuring Project Pat, DMX, Swizz Beatz)
- Poppin' My Collar (Cracktrack Remix Instrumentals)
- Poppin' My Collar (The Last Mr. Bigg solo version)
- Poppin' My Collar (Remix) (featuring Project Pat, DMX, Lil Flip)
- Poppin' My Collar (Swizz Cracktracks Remix) (featuring Project Pat, DMX, Lil Flip, Swizz Beatz)
- Covered by the Mars Volta during "Cygnus....Vismund Cygnus" on 1/30/08 in Irvine, Ca.
- Poppin' My Collar (Swizz Cracktracks Remix) (featuring Project Pat & B.G.)

== Charts ==
=== Weekly charts ===
Chart (2006)	Peak position
US Billboard Hot 100	21
US Hot R&B/Hip-Hop Songs (Billboard)	10
US Hot Rap Songs (Billboard)	6
US Rhythmic Airplay (Billboard)	20

=== Year-end charts ===
Chart (2006)	Position
US Hot R&B/Hip-Hop Songs (Billboard)	62

== Certifications ==
Region	Certification	Certified units/sales
United States (RIAA)	Gold	500,000^{^}
United States (RIAA) Mastertone	Platinum	1,000,000^{*}
^{*} Sales figures based on certification alone.^{^} Shipments figures based on certification alone.

== Release history ==
Release dates and formats for "Poppin' My Collar"
Region	Date	Format	Label(s)	Ref.
United States	March 27, 2006	Mainstream airplay	Sony Urban; Columbia	
