= Don't Save Her =

2001 single by Project Pat featuring Crunchy Black

Single by Project Pat featuring Crunchy Black

from the album Mista Don't Play: Everythangs Workin
- Released: 2001
- Genre: Southern hip-hop; gangsta rap; crunk
- Length: 4:19
- Label: Loud; Hypnotize Minds; RED
- Songwriter(s): Patrick Houston; Paul Beauregard; Jordan Houston; Darnell Carlton
- Producer(s): DJ Paul; Juicy J

Project Pat singles chronology
"Chickenhead" (2000)	"Don't Save Her" (2001)	"Good Googly Moogly" (2006)

Music video
- "Don't Save Her" on YouTube

"Don't Save Her" is a song by American rapper Project Pat and the second single from his second studio album Mista Don't Play: Everythangs Workin (2001). It features American rapper Crunchy Black. Produced by DJ Paul and Juicy J, the song contains a sample of "Where Da Cheese At" by Three 6 Mafia. Both DJ Paul and Crunchy Black perform the chorus.

In 2014, American rapper J. Cole notably interpolated lyrics from the hook ("Don't save her, she don't wanna be saved") in his song "No Role Modelz", to which Project Pat has responded favorably.

== Charts ==
Chart (2001)	Peak position
US Hot R&B/Hip-Hop Songs (Billboard)	73
