= Ridin' Spinners =

Single by Three 6 Mafia

from the album Da Unbreakables
- Released: May 31, 2003
- Genre: Hip-hop; crunk
- Length: 4:10
- Label: Columbia Records; Hypnotize Minds
- Songwriters: Jordan Houston; Paul Beauregard; George Clinton; Bernard Worrell; Abrim Tilmon; William Collins; Eric Wright; Andre Young; Wesley Weston
- Producers: DJ Paul; Juicy J

Three 6 Mafia singles chronology
"Baby Mama" (2001)	"Ridin' Spinners" (2003)	"Stay Fly" (2005)

"Ridin' Spinners" is a song by American hip-hop group Three 6 Mafia, featuring Lil' Flip. It was the only single released in support of their 2003 album, Da Unbreakables. Produced by DJ Paul and Juicy J, it contains a sample of "Eazy-Duz-It" (1988) by Eazy-E.

The single was a minor summer radio hit on the subject of then-popular spinning rims. It was also nominated in the "Single of the year — collaboration" category for The Source's 2004 Hip-Hop Music Awards, ultimately losing to "Damn!" by YoungBloodZ.

== Music video ==
"Ridin' Spinners" received a music video following its release. In Juicy J's 2023 memoir, Chronicles of the Juice Man, he claimed that group member Lord Infamous overdosed on drugs during the video shoot.

== Critical reception ==
Winfred Cross, writing for The Charlotte Post, called the single "perfect summer fluff" and "the kind of thing that could be a huge hit if given the right exposure". Steve Juon of RapReviews described "Ridin' Spinners" as a "bouncy and infectious" inclusion on an album otherwise "filled with futile nonsense".

== Chart performance ==
Chart (2003)	Peak position
US Hot R&B/Hip-Hop Songs (Billboard)	62
