= Sippin' on Some Syrup =

Single by Three 6 Mafia featuring UGK and Project Pat

from the album When the Smoke Clears: Sixty 6, Sixty 1
- Released: February 6, 2000
- Recorded: 1999
- Genre: Hip-hop
- Length: 4:24
- Label: Loud
- Songwriters: Paul Beauregard, Chad L. Butler, Bernard Freeman, Jordan Houston
- Producers: DJ Paul, Juicy J

Three 6 Mafia singles chronology
"'Who Run It?'" (2000)	"Sippin' On Some Syrup" (2000)	"Chickenhead" (2000)

UGK singles chronology
"Sippin' On Some Syrup" (2000)	"Big Pimpin'" (2000)

Project Pat singles chronology
"Ballers" (1999)	"Sippin' On Some Syrup" (2000)	"Chickenhead" (2000)

Music video
- "Sippin On Some Syrup (Official Video)" on YouTube

"Sippin' on Some Syrup", sometimes known as "Sippin' on Some Sizzurp", is the second single from Three 6 Mafia's fourth studio album When the Smoke Clears: Sixty 6, Sixty 1. It features UGK and Project Pat. The song peaked at #30 on the Hot R&B/Hip-Hop Songs chart.

== Music video ==
A video directed by Jeff Byrd was made for the song, with airtime on MTV and BET. It features an Insane Clown Posse "Amazing Jeckel Brothers" shirt at 1:14, a reference to Three 6 Mafia's longstanding friendship with Psychopathic Records.

The video version censors all references to purple drank, including the chorus, which is rendered as "sippin' on some s*****p".

== Remix ==
The main remix, "Sippin' on Some Syrup (Remix)" a.k.a. "Purple Punch" Chevy 04 Purple Caddy, features Dipset rappers Cam'ron, Jim Jones, and Juelz Santana. DJ Paul, Juicy J, and Bun B also return with new verses (Pimp C could not return due to his incarceration) and Project Pat's chorus from the original was included. A video of the remix was made, although Cam'ron's verse is removed.

== Chart performance ==
Chart (2000)	Peak position
US Hot R&B/Hip-Hop Songs (Billboard)	30
