= No Filter (Lil Wyte and JellyRoll album) =

Studio album by Lil Wyte and JellyRoll
- Released: July 16, 2013
- Recorded: 2013
- Studio: Greenway Studios (Franklin, Tennessee)
- Genre: Southern hip-hop
- Length: 58:24
- Label: Phixieous Entertainment
- Producer: Wes Phillips (exec.); Lil Wyte (exec.); JellyRoll (exec.); Thomas "Stoner" Toner (also exec.); Ed Pryor; BandPlay; DJ MoneyGreen; J. Sirianni; Shape Shifta; Sonny Bama; The Avengerz; The Colleagues

Lil Wyte and JellyRoll chronology
Year Round (2011)	No Filter (2013)	No Filter 2 (2016)

Lil Wyte chronology
Still Doubted? (2012)	No Filter (2013)	B.A.R. (Bay Area Representatives) (2014)

JellyRoll chronology
The Big Sal Story (2012)	No Filter (2013)	Business as Usual (2013)

No Filter is the collaborative studio album by American rappers Lil Wyte and JellyRoll. It was released on July 16, 2013, through Phixieous Entertainment with distribution via Select-O-Hits. Recording sessions took place at Greenway Studios in Franklin, Tennessee and, according to both rappers, it was recorded in one week. Production was handled by BandPlay, DJ MoneyGreen, Ed Pryor, Greenway, J. Sirianni, Shape Shifta, Sonny Bama, The Avengerz and The Colleagues with executive producers Thomas Toner, Wes Phillips, Lil Wyte and Jelly Roll. It features guest appearances from Caskey, J Ceaz, Jesse Whitley, Rell, Robin Raynelle, Sonny Bama, Twiztid and V.V.S. The album peaked at #33 on the Top R&B/Hip-Hop Albums, #17 on the Top Rap Albums and #42 on the Independent Albums in the United States.

Its sequel, No Filter 2, was released on November 18, 2016, via Bad Apple Inc.

== Background ==
Lil Wyte and JellyRoll previously has released an album Year Round with BPZ as hip hop trio SNO in 2011. No Filter was announced by both rappers via Twitter. The album cover was revealed on May 18, 2013. Its lead single, "Break the Knob Off", along with the music video was released on May 28. The second song from the album was released on June 3, titled "Back to the Start", Prod. By GC Beatz (The GoldynChylde) but it didn't appear in the final version due to sampling clearance (it sampled the hook of "The Scientist" by Willie Nelson). On June 25, the complete track list for the album was revealed. The album was supported by a mixtape entitled July 16th, which was also released on June 25, 2013. An earlier version of the song "This Down Here" featuring Big SMO appeared on the July 16th mixtape. Lil Wyte also confirmed country rapper Colt Ford appearing on the remix of "This Down Here".

== Track listing ==
No.	Title	Producer(s)	Length
1.	"All We Do (Get Fucked Up)"	BandPlay	2:50
2.	"We're Back"	Ed Pryor	3:47
3.	"Break the Knob Off"	The Colleagues	3:41
4.	"Smoke & Get High" (featuring J Ceaz & Rell)	Thomas "Greenway" Toner a.k.a. T-Stoner	4:10
5.	"One of Them Dayz" (featuring Twiztid)	Shape Shifta	4:06
6.	"Pimpin'"	Thomas "Greenway" Toner a.k.a. T-Stoner	4:05
7.	"Ball Baby Ball"	Thomas "Greenway" Toner a.k.a. T-Stoner	3:37
8.	"Shake N Bake"	J. Sirianni	3:32
9.	"Band Plays On"	Thomas "Greenway" Toner a.k.a. T-Stoner	3:41
10.	"Bigger" (featuring Sonny Bama)	Sonny Bama	3:05
11.	"Smoke Beer"	Thomas "Greenway" Toner a.k.a. T-Stoner	3:04
12.	"This Down Here" (featuring Jesse Whitley)	Thomas "Greenway" Toner a.k.a. T-Stoner	3:10
13.	"Freaky Girls" (featuring V.V.S.)	Thomas "Greenway" Toner a.k.a. T-Stoner	4:20
14.	"Molly By Da Gram" (featuring Caskey)	The Avengerz	3:58
15.	"Our Love Song"	DJ MoneyGreen	3:21
16.	"Move Mountains" (featuring Robin Raynelle)	Ed Pryor	4:03
17.	"Blow My High" (featuring Sonny Bama)	Sonny Bama	4:30
Total length:			58:24

== Charts ==
Chart (2013)	Peak position
US Top R&B/Hip-Hop Albums (Billboard)	33
US Top Rap Albums (Billboard)	17
US Independent Albums (Billboard)	42
