= When the Smoke Clears: Sixty 6, Sixty 1 =

Studio album by Three 6 Mafia
- Released: June 13, 2000
- Genres: Horrorcore; gangsta rap; Memphis rap; crunk; hardcore hip-hop
- Length: 74:36
- Labels: RED; Hypnotize Minds; Loud; SRC
- Producers: DJ Paul (also exec.); Juicy J (also exec.)

Three 6 Mafia chronology
Underground Vol. 2: Club Memphis (1999)	When the Smoke Clears: Sixty 6, Sixty 1 (2000)	Underground Vol. 3: Kings of Memphis (2000)

Singles from When the Smoke Clears: Sixty 6, Sixty 1
- 1. "Who Run It" Released: January 24, 2000; 2. "Sippin' on Some Syrup" Released: February 6, 2000; 3. "Tongue Ring" Released: May 4, 2000

When the Smoke Clears: Sixty 6, Sixty 1 is the fourth studio album by American hip-hop group Three 6 Mafia. The album was released on June 13, 2000, by RED Distribution, SRC Records, Loud Records, and DJ Paul and Juicy J's Hypnotize Minds. The album bolstered the group's popularity immensely, and contains some of Three 6 Mafia's most well known tracks, such as "Sippin' on Some Syrup", "Who Run It", and "I'm So Hi". The album was one of the last projects featuring all of the original group's members, as Gangsta Boo left after the Choices: The Album soundtrack, and Koopsta Knicca left after the album's release. The album title is a reference to the year 1999 being 6661 (Sixty 6, Sixty 1) inverted.

== Commercial performance ==
The album peaked at number 6 on the Billboard 200. It was certified platinum by the RIAA (Recording Industry Association of America) for selling 1,000,000 copies on December 1, 2000.

== Critical reception ==
Professional ratings
Review scores
Source	Rating
AllMusic	3/5 stars

AllMusic emphasizes the more polished production compared to the band's previous albums, but feels that the length of the opus results in the presence of a few filler tracks, making the whole uneven. Despite these imperfections, AllMusic considers When the Smoke Clears to be "a noteworthy addition to Three 6 Mafia's deep canon".

== Track listing ==
- All tracks are produced by DJ Paul and Juicy J

No.	Title	Length
1.	"Intro"	0:59
2.	"44 Killers (Interlude)"	1:44
3.	"Sippin' on Some Syrup" (featuring UGK & Project Pat)	4:24
4.	"Weak Azz Bitch" (featuring La Chat)	2:49
5.	"Just Like Us"	4:16
6.	"I'm So Hi"	3:57
7.	"Mafia Niggaz"	3:05
8.	"Hook Up W/Hoes (Skit)"	0:41
9.	"From Da Back"	4:04
10.	"Fuck Y'all Hoes"	4:01
11.	"Where Da Cheese At"	2:31
12.	"Tongue Ring"	4:06
13.	"Barrin' You Bitches"	3:39
14.	"Whatcha Know" (featuring Big Gipp)	4:20
15.	"Act Like You Know Me (Point 'Em Out)"	4:11
16.	"Take A Bump"	2:27
17.	"Touched Wit It" (featuring Fiend, La Chat & Mr. Serv-On)	4:11
18.	"M.E.M.P.H.I.S." (featuring Hypnotize Camp Posse: Project Pat, La Chat, T-Rock, M.C. Mack & Young Buck)	4:53
19.	"Just Anotha Crazy Click" (featuring Insane Clown Posse & Twiztid)	3:59
20.	"Who Run It"	4:11
21.	"Put Ya Signs"	4:15
22.	"What's Next (Outro)"	1:53
Total length:		74:36

== Charts ==
=== Weekly charts ===
Chart (2000)	Peak position
US Billboard 200	6
US Top R&B/Hip-Hop Albums (Billboard)	2

=== Year-end charts ===
Chart (2000)	Position
US Billboard 200	94
US Top R&B/Hip-Hop Albums (Billboard)	30

== Certifications ==
Region	Certification	Certified units/sales
United States (RIAA)	Platinum	1,000,000^{^}
^{^} Shipments figures based on certification alone.
