= Phinally Phamous =

Studio album by Lil Wyte
- Released: October 19, 2004
- Studio: Hypnotize Minds Studio (Memphis, TN)
- Genre: Southern hip-hop
- Length: 1:11:47
- Label: Hypnotize Minds; Asylum
- Producer: DJ Paul; Juicy J

Lil Wyte chronology
Doubt Me Now (2003)	Phinally Phamous (2004)	The One and Only (2007)

Chopped & Screwed cover

Professional ratings
Review scores
Source	Rating
AllMusic	4/5 stars

Phinally Phamous is the second solo studio album by American rapper Lil Wyte. It was released on October 19, 2004 through Hypnotize Minds/Asylum Records. Recording sessions took place at Hypnotize Minds Studio in Memphis. Produced by DJ Paul and Juicy J, it features guest appearances from fellow Hypnotize Camp Posse members, as well as Dirtbag and Josey Scott. The album debuted at number 64 on the Billboard 200, number 6 on the Top R&B/Hip-Hop Albums and number 4 on the Top Rap Albums charts in the United States. The album is Lil Wyte's only release that has been confirmed to be out of print as of 2012.

== Track listing ==
No.	Title	Length
1.	"Phinally Phamous"	1:36
2.	"I Sho Will"	4:41
3.	"Static Addict"	3:06
4.	"Smoke My Dro" (featuring Dirtbag)	3:00
5.	"Icy White Soljas"	3:08
6.	"Hoods Run Down" (featuring Frayser Boy)	3:54
7.	"By 2 da Bad Guy" (featuring DJ Paul)	3:15
8.	"I Did 'Em Wrong"	4:00
9.	"My Cutlass"	3:48
10.	"Big Ass Guns" (featuring Frayser Boy)	3:55
11.	"Look Like You"	2:56
12.	"U.S. Soldier Boy" (featuring Three 6 Mafia)	4:41
13.	"Drinking Song"	4:49
14.	"Bay Area"	3:44
15.	"Acid 2004/5"	3:24
16.	"Bald Head Hoes" (featuring DJ Paul and Juicy J)	4:08
17.	"Everybody Gettin Crunk"	3:17
18.	"Posse Song" (featuring Hypnotize Camp Posse)	3:15
19.	"Crazy" (featuring Josey Scott)	3:52
20.	"Outro"	3:18
Total length:		1:11:47

== Charts ==
Chart (2004)	Peak position
US Billboard 200	64
US Top R&B/Hip-Hop Albums (Billboard)	6
US Top Rap Albums (Billboard)	4
