= Spinner (wheel) =

Automobile wheel part

The spinner on automobile wheels refers to knock-off hub nuts or center caps. They may be the actual, or intended to simulate, the design used on antique vehicles or vintage sports cars.

A "spinner wheel" in contemporary usage is a type of hubcap or inner wheel ornament that spins independently inside a wheel itself when the vehicle is in motion and continues to spin once it has stopped.

== Original use ==
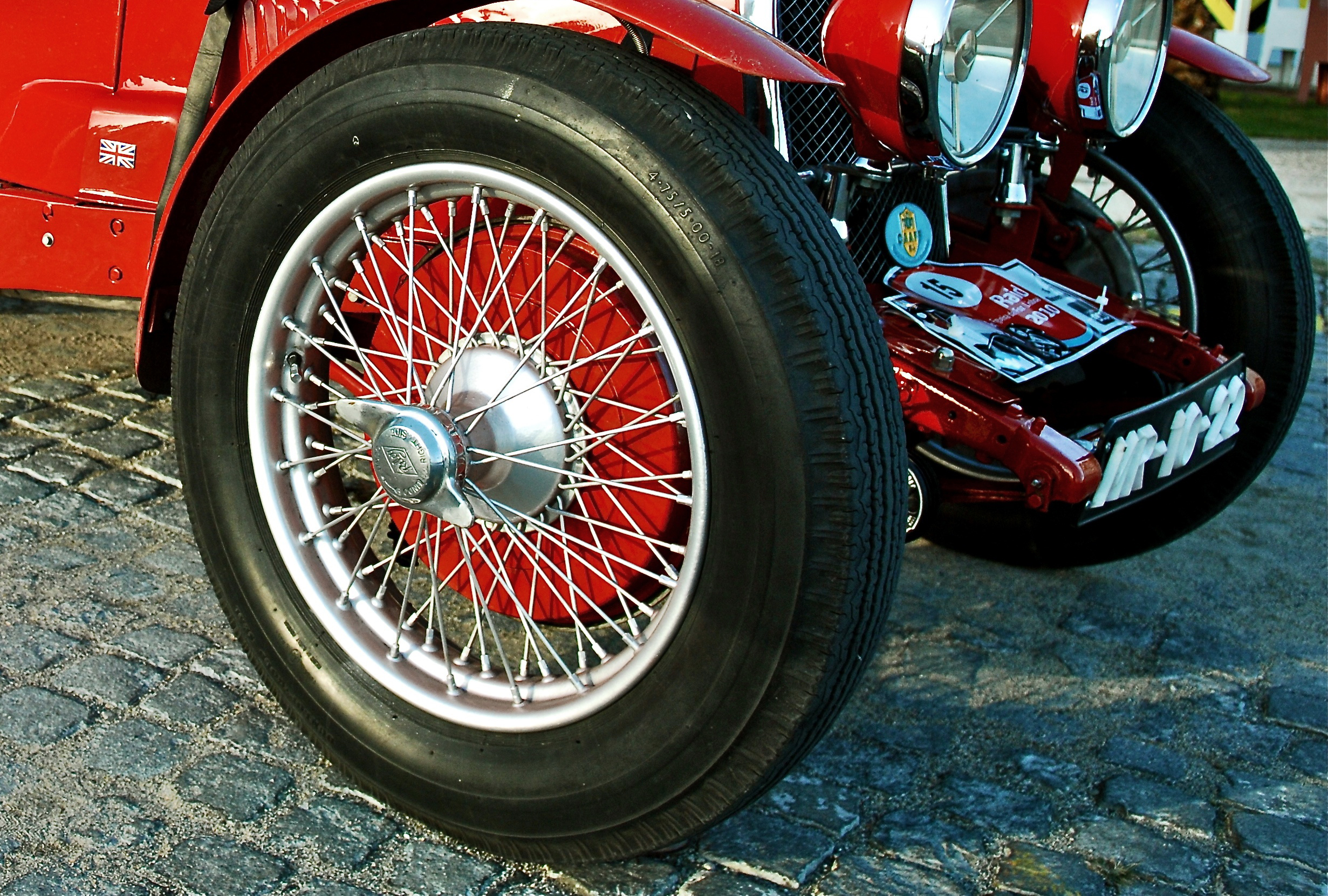
Two bladed spinner on a wire wheel

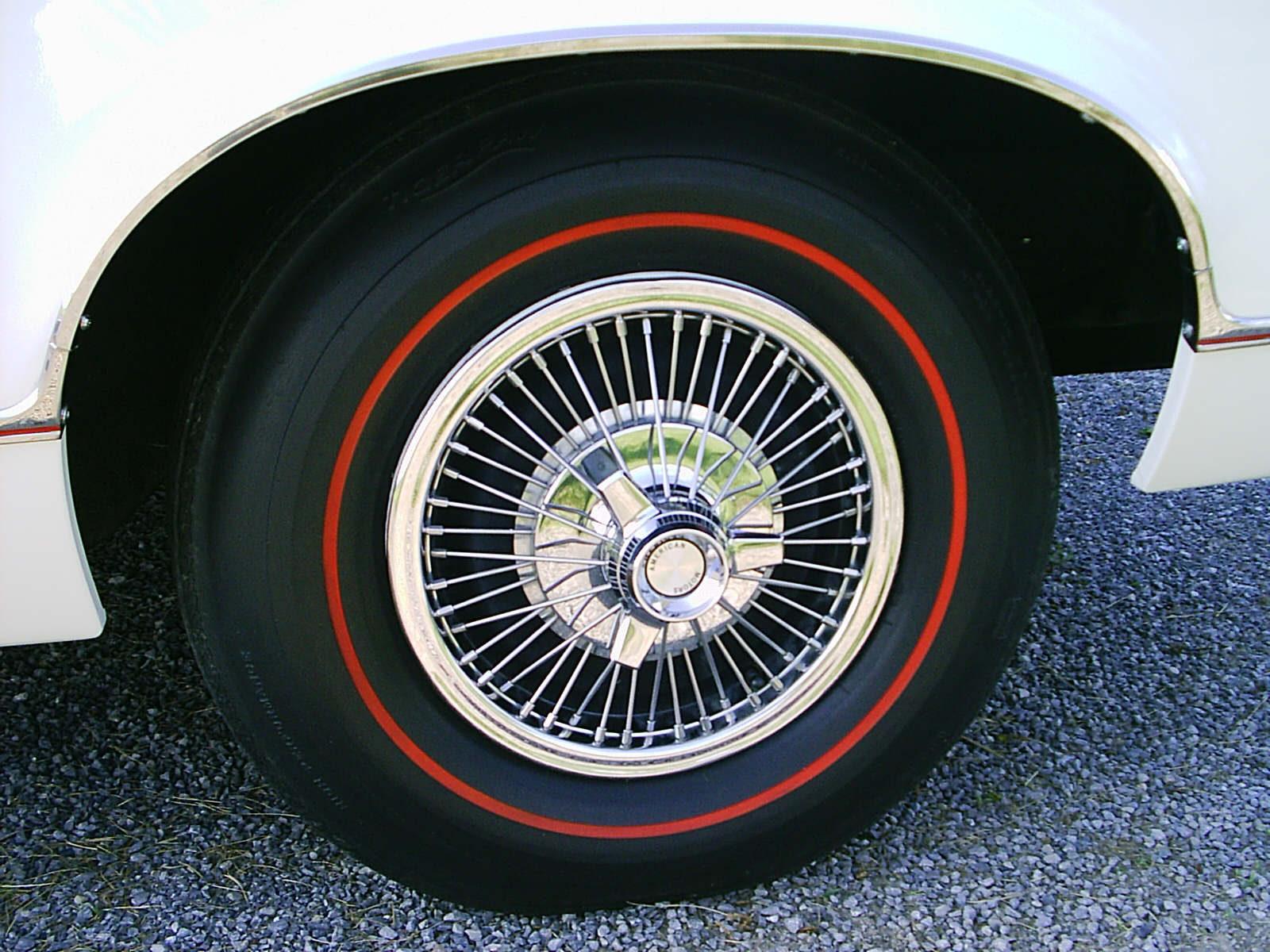
1967 AMC simulated wire wheel cover with spinner

The spinner or "knock-off" originated with Rudge-Whitworth center lock wire wheels and hubs, which were first patented in 1908. The spinner was a threaded, winged nut designed to keep the wheel fastened to the hub. They were screwed on and "knocked on tightly" using a hammer, hence the name "knock-offs". Most setups will feature right-hand threads on the left side of the vehicle, and left-hand threads (rotate clockwise to remove) on the vehicle's right side so the screw-on spinner would stay tightened as the auto was in forward motion. This style of "knock-off" wheel was standard on road cars until the development of the lug nut method attaching the wheel.

== Spinner hubcaps ==
The spinner hubcap was introduced into the commercial vehicle and passenger automobile market in the 1930s. Automotive designer Harley Earl expressed a brash philosophy behind his 1950s automobiles that included "glittering spinner hubcaps." During the 1950s and 1960s automobile manufacturers offered simulated wire wheel covers for a look of luxury that featured crisscrossing spokes designed to look like the real wire wheels that were used on vehicles in the 1920s and 1930s. These "spinner-wheel covers" were available on standard as well as featured on custom cars, and lowriders quickly adapted them for their vehicles.

During the early-1960s, the simulated wire wheel covers returned, but with a new look designed to emphasize sportiness with their radiating spokes and center "spinner caps." These classic center spinner caps feature a rigidly mounted propeller-like center element, usually with two or three projecting "blades." They were intended to simulate the knock-off hubs that were used on vintage racing vehicles and classic sports cars where a hammer or special wrench was used on the spinner to release or tighten the wheel to the hub.

These spinner hubcaps were most often an optional appearance upgrade to the standard equipment hubcaps or full wheel covers that attached to stamped steel wheels. Top trim models sometimes included spinner wheel covers as standard equipment to appeal to youthful customers.

In the late 1960s, U.S. Federal safety standards banned the use of protruding bar spinners on automobiles.

== Other uses ==
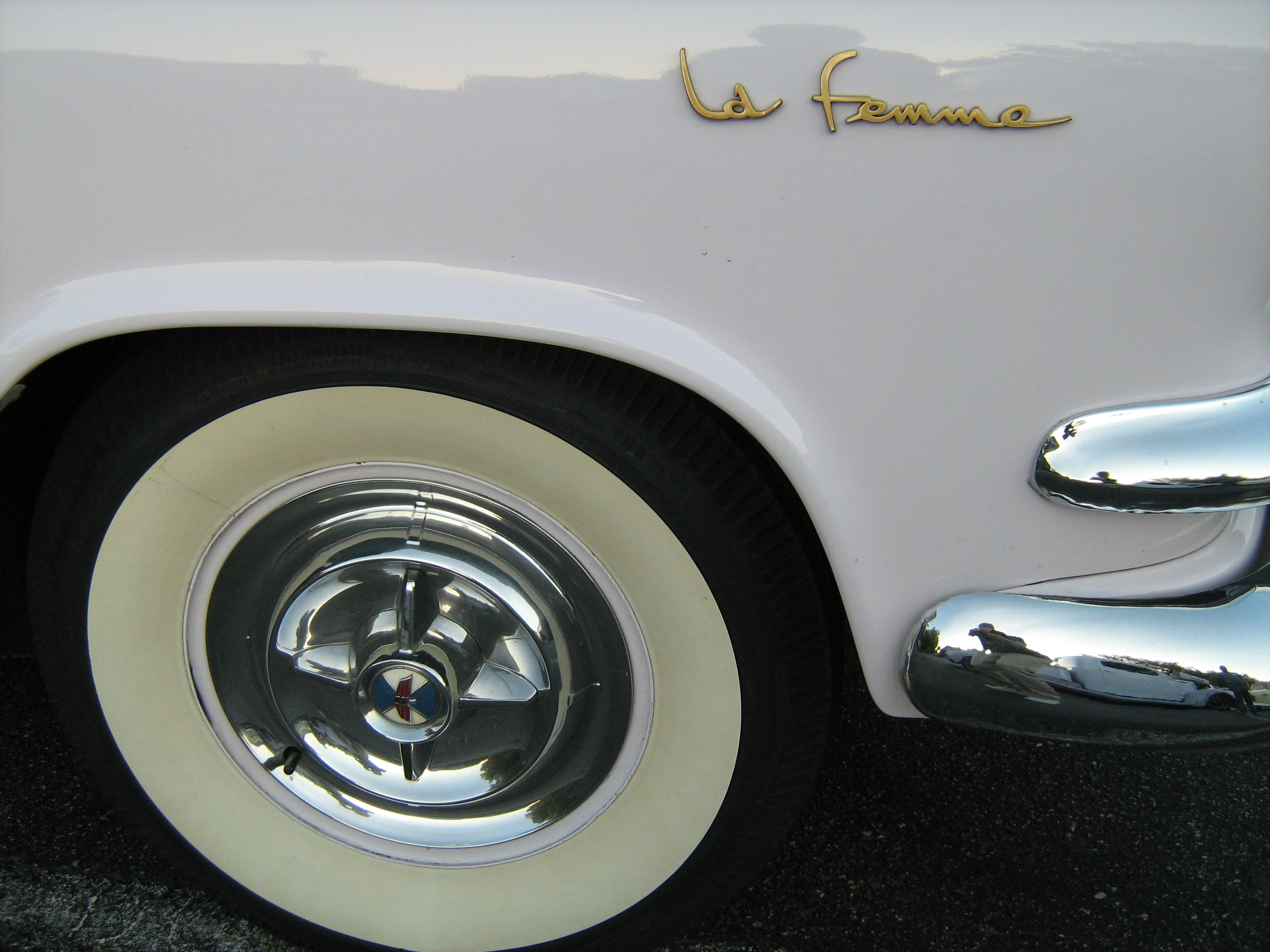
Dodge four-bladed "spinner" wheel cover

The mid-1950s Dodge four-bladed "spinner" wheel covers became an icon for the era and also became an item popular among owners to customize their cars.

Spinners were an add-on accessory marketed during the 1950s to decorate regular wheel covers for a custom look. Center spinner hubcaps were also available as original equipment from automakers.

Custom wheels for lowriders also used naked ladies on wheel covers, and these were the first to feature a floating or spinner-type wheel device. A bracket was used to mount to the spindle, so while the lady stood still the wheel spun around. Similarly, the Rolls-Royce Phantom has anti-spinners – the "RR" logo in the center of the hub is mounted on a spinner or gyroscopic mechanism with an offset weight designed to ensure that the logo is always the right way up when the car is parked.

The hubometers used on large trucks, buses, and trailers appear stationary while the wheel is turning to measure the distance covered accurately. They are enclosed and float in a liquid with anti-freeze to function in severe low temperatures without freezing.

== Modern concept ==
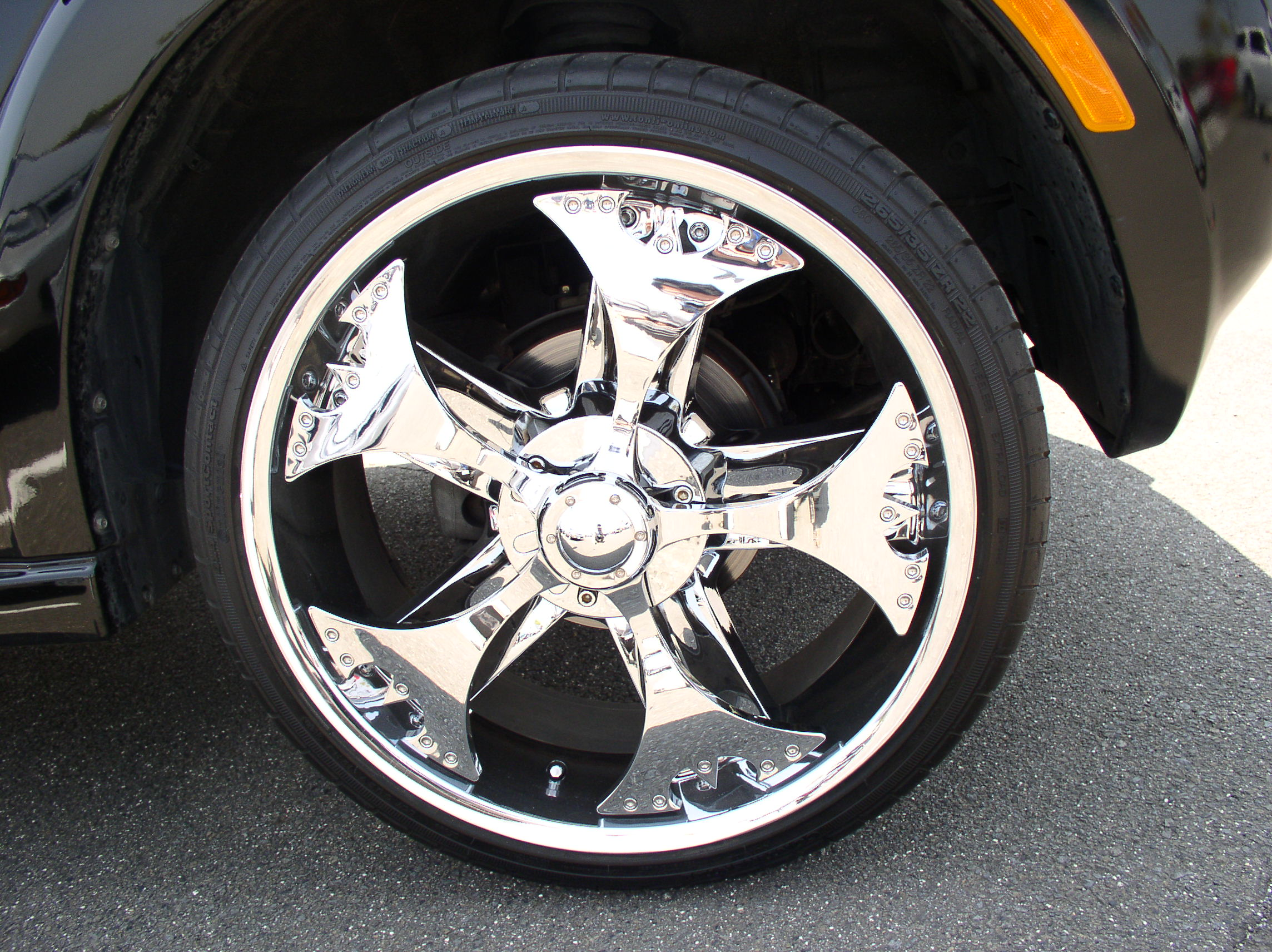
Rotating spinner wheel

The modern spinner device is a decorative kinetic attachment to the wheel of an automobile. The spinner covers the center of a car's wheel and is designed to independently rotate by using one or more roller bearings to isolate the spinner from the wheel, enabling it to continue turning after the vehicle comes to a stop.

Legislative bills were proposed in several US states to ban spinner-type wheels and hubcaps that simulate movement even when a vehicle is stopped because they could be disconcerting to other motorists and present a safety hazard.

Spinners were popular during the early 2000s within the hip-hop community of the United States. Since the mid-2000s, they have gradually faded out of vogue.

== Music ==
The spinner-type automobile hubcaps were the inspiration for a Detroit-area R&B/soul group, The Domingoes, to rename themselves The Spinners in the late 1950s.

In 1960, Pat Davis recorded the song "Spinner Hub Caps".

In 2003, as spinning rims were at the height of their popularity in hip-hop culture, Three 6 Mafia released the song "Ridin' Spinners". The song title refers to driving while having spinning rims installed on the car. In the first line of the song, DJ Paul urges all the "players out there ridin' spinners" to "stop, and let 'em keep spinnin' baby", and the chorus repeatedly proclaims that the spinners "don't stop". The song was on the album Da Unbreakables, which was certified gold by the RIAA.

"Weird Al" Yankovic's 2006 song "White & Nerdy" contains the lines "My rims never spin to the contrary / You'll find that they're quite stationary".

== See also ==
- Custom wheel
- Hubcap
