= It's Hard out Here for a Pimp =

Song by Three 6 Mafia

from the album Hustle & Flow soundtrack and Most Known Unknown (reissue)
- Released: 2005
- Genre: Memphis rap
- Length: 3:02
- Label: Atlantic, Grand Hustle
- Songwriters: DJ Paul, Juicy J, Frayser Boy
- Producers: DJ Paul, Juicy J, Cassius King

"It's Hard out Here for a Pimp" is a song written by American hip hop group Three 6 Mafia, alongside Cedric Coleman, as the theme song to the American drama film Hustle & Flow (2005). It won the Academy Award for Best Original Song and in 2006 was ranked number 80 on VH1's "100 Greatest Songs of Hip Hop".

== Background ==
The song was performed in Hustle & Flow by Terrence Howard and Taraji P. Henson as their respective characters DJay and Shug. Three 6 Mafia included their own version of the song with vocalist Paula Campbell on a 2006 special edition reissue of their platinum album Most Known Unknown.

In 2015, Howard and Henson competed against each other in the Season 1 finale of the Spike series Lip Sync Battle and, by popular demand, performed the song as the first duet by competitors in the show's history.

=== Song composition and production ===
"It's Hard out Here for a Pimp" is a crunk-style pimp rap composition. Initially, director Craig Brewer attempted to rap the soundtrack himself before collaborating with Three 6 Mafia through John Singleton, who suggested the song's thematic focus on the paradoxical power dynamics of pimp culture. During recording, actor Terrence Howard (who portrayed protagonist DJay) initially struggled to adapt to working with authentic rappers until Juicy J facilitated their collaboration. Frayser Boy contributed to the lyrics, titling the track.

== 78th Academy Awards ==
At the 78th Academy Awards in 2006, Three 6 Mafia and Henson performed the song shortly before it won the Academy Award for Best Original Song. Howard did not wish to perform at the ceremony, and since two of the song's writers are themselves artists in the form of the trio Three 6 Mafia, they were given the opportunity to perform it.

Three 6 Mafia became the first hip hop group to win an Academy Award for Best Original Song, and the first hip hop artists to perform at the ceremony. It was the second hip hop song to win an Oscar, after Eminem's "Lose Yourself" from the film 8 Mile (2002).

This song became the third in five years to win the Oscar without a Golden Globe Award nomination. The others were "If I Didn't Have You" from Monsters, Inc. (2001) and "Al Otro Lado del Río" from The Motorcycle Diaries (2004).

Critics like Chron.com says it portrayed pimping in a positive light and Harvard Crimson says it portrayed the African-American community in a negative light.

== In popular culture ==
In 2013, English singer Lily Allen referenced the song in her song "Hard Out Here", in which the word "pimp" is replaced with the word "bitch" to mock sexism in the music industry.
