= Frayser Boy =

American rapper

- Born: Cedric Kelvin Coleman; North Memphis, Memphis, Tennessee, U.S.
- Genres: Southern hip-hop; gangsta rap
- Occupation: Rapper
- Years active: 1999–present
- Labels: Hypnotize Minds; Asylum; Phixieous
- Website: twitter.com/FrayserBoy

Cedric Kelvin Coleman, professionally known by his stage name Frayser Boy, is an American Academy Award-winning rapper from Memphis, Tennessee. He was formerly signed to Hypnotize Minds, the record label run by Three 6 Mafia founders DJ Paul and Juicy J, and had released three studio albums under the label: Gone on That Bay (2003), Me Being Me (2005), and Da Key (2008). At the 78th Academy Awards, he won the Academy Award for Best Original Song for "It's Hard out Here for a Pimp" along with Three 6 Mafia members Juicy J, Crunchy Black, and DJ Paul.

In 2014, Coleman released B.A.R. (Bay Area Representatives), a ten years in the making collaborative project with fellow rapper Lil Wyte, and his fourth solo studio album titled Not No Moe, both through Phixieous Entertainment. Same year, he was featured in the documentary film Take Me to the River along with Terrence Howard, Snoop Dogg, Yo Gotti and Al Kapone among others. In 2018, he starred in Muck Sticky-directed drama film Dig That, Zeebo Newton. He is currently working on his fifth solo effort, Gone on That Bay 2, a sequel to his debut full-length.

== Discography ==
List of studio albums, with selected chart positions
Title	Album details	Peak chart positions		
Title	Album details	US	US R&B	US Rap
Gone on That Bay	Released: August 26, 2003; Label: Hypnotize Minds	178	23	—
Me Being Me	Released: July 12, 2005; Label: Hypnotize Minds/Asylum	124	24	15
Da Key	Released: May 20, 2008; Label: Hypnotize Minds	—	22	8
B.A.R. (Bay Area Representatives) (with Lil Wyte)	Released: February 4, 2014; Label: Phixieous Entertainment	—	46	23
Not No Moe	Released: 2014; Label: Phixieous Entertainment	—	—	—
"—" denotes a recording that did not chart.
