= Rocko discography =

Hip hop recording artist discography

- Studio albums: 1
- Singles: 25
- Music videos: 13
- Mixtapes: 17

The discography of Rocko, an American rapper, consists of one studio album, 17 mixtapes and 13 singles (including 12 as a featured artist) and 13 (music videos)

== Albums ==
=== Studio albums ===
Studio album, with selected chart positions
Title	Album details	Peak chart positions		
Title	Album details	US	US R&B	US Rap
Self Made	Released: March 18, 2008 (US); Label: Rocky Road, So So Def, Def Jam; Formats: CD, LP, digital download	21	6	4

== Mixtapes ==
List of mixtapes
Title	Album details
Swag Season	Released: December 20, 2007 (US); Label: Rocky Road; Formats: Digital download
Wildlife	Released: March 1, 2010 (US); Label: A1; Formats: Digital download
Rocko Dinero	Released: November 25, 2010 (US); Label: A1; Formats: Digital download
Gift of Gab	Released: November 24, 2011 (US); Label: A1; Formats: Digital download
Wordplay	Released: October 25, 2012 (US); Label: A1; Formats: Digital download
Gift of Gab 2	Released: February 15, 2013 (US); Label: A1; Formats: Digital download
Lingo 4 Dummies	Released: February 7, 2014 (US); Label: A1; Formats: Digital download
Sometimes	Released: May 6, 2014; Label: A1 / Boomrama Records; Format: Digital download
Poet	Released: May 29, 2014 (US); Label: A1; Formats: Digital download
IGNANT	Released: October 15, 2014 (US); Label: A1 / Street Katz; Formats: Digital download
FOOD	Released: November 27, 2014 (US); Label: A1 / Street Katz; Formats: Digital download
Expect The Unexpected	Released: February 20, 2015 (US); Label: A1 / Street Katz; Formats: Digital download
Gucci Da Don (with Gucci Mane)	Released: March 12, 2015; Label: A1 / Street Kratz, Wild Ginger; Format: Digital download
Real Spill	Released: July 1, 2015 (US); Label: A1 / Street Katz; Formats: Digital download
ATL Dons (with Gucci Mane)	Released: December 11, 2015; Label: A1 / Street Kratz, 1017 Brick Squad Records, RBC Records; Format: Digital download
Wordplay 2	Released: May 26, 2016; Label: A1 / Street Katz; Formats: Digital download
Lost Tapes (with Zaytoven)	Released: February 18, 2021; Label: A1 / Street Kratz, Zaytoven Global, LLC; Format: Digital download

== Singles ==
=== As lead artist ===
List of singles as lead artist, with selected chart positions, showing year released and album name
Title	Year	Peak chart positions			Certifications	Album
Title	Year	US	US R&B/HH	US Rap	Certifications	Album
"Umma Do Me"	2007	66	13	7		Self-Made
"Tomorrow"	2008	—	80	—		Self-Made
"Maybe"	2010	—	52	—		Wildlife
"Goin' Steady"	2011	—	53	—		Rocko Dinero
"Mouf" (featuring Plies and Gucci Mane)	2012	—	—	—		Non-album single
"Nacho$"	2013	—	—	—		Wordplay
"U.O.E.N.O." (featuring Future and Rick Ross)	2013	20	5	4	RIAA: Gold	Gift of Gab 2
"ShiiKno" (featuring LLoyd)	2013	—	—	—		Gift of Gab 2
"Money Motivated" (with Yung Hustla)	2013	—	—	—		Non-album single
"NunnaYu"	2013	—	—	—		Lingo 4 Dummys
"Which 1 U Workin" (featuring Young Jeezy)	2013	—	—	—		Lingo 4 Dummys
"Hustle" (featuring Nas and Atozzio)	2014	—	—	—		Non-album singles
"Luv"	2014	—	—	—		Non-album singles
"—" denotes a recording that did not chart.

=== As featured artist ===
List of singles as featured artist, with selected chart positions, showing year released and album name
Title	Year	Peak chart positions	Album
Title	Year	US Bub.	Album
"I Can't Help It" (T.I. featuring Rocko)	2010	18	No Mercy
"Walk It to the Bank" (LoFat featuring Rocko and Yung L.A.)	2009	—	Non-album singles
"Got Swag" (Beans featuring Rocko)	2009	—	Non-album singles
"B.F.F." (Mook featuring Rocko)	2012	—	Non-album singles
"Say Nun" (The Rock Mob featuring Future and Rocko)	2012	—	Non-album singles
"I Like It" (Charm featuring Rocko)	2012	—	Non-album singles
"Super Bad Bitch" (Vu-C featuring Rocko)	2013	—	Non-album singles
"Wu Wuu Wuuu" (Uncle Murda featuring Rocko)	2013	—	Non-album singles
"Better Days" (Sara Alina featuring Rocko and Yung L.A.)	2014	—	Non-album singles
"Sour" (Styles P featuring Jadakiss and Rocko)	2014	—	Phantom and the Ghost
"Oak Cliff 4eva" (Wes Dog featuring Rocko and Yung Richie Porter)	2014	—	Non-album singles
"Gumbo" (Stak5 featuring Rocko, T.I. and Jeezy)	2014	—	TBA

== Other charted songs ==
List of singles as lead artist, with selected chart positions, showing year released and album name
Title	Year	Peak chart positions	Album
Title	Year	US R&B	Album
"Watch This" (Future featuring Rocko)	2011	78	Dirty Sprite
"I Don't Love Her" (Gucci Mane featuring Rocko and Webbie)	2011	102	The Return of Mr. Zone 6
"Squares Out Your Circle" (featuring Future)	2011	66	Gift of Gab
"Plain Jane" (Gucci Mane featuring T.I. and Rocko)	2012	110	I'm Up

== Guest appearances ==
List of non-single guest appearances, with other performing artists, showing year released and album name
Title	Year	Other artist(s)	Album
"Easy"	2008	Nicki Minaj	Beam Me Up Scotty
"Yeah"	2008	Diamond, Teairra Marí	Can’t Tell Me Nuthin'
"Watch Cost A Bentley"	2009	Gucci Mane	Burrrprint: 3D (The Movie: Part 3)
"Coca Coca"	2010	Gucci Mane, OJ da Juiceman, Waka Flocka Flame, Shawty Lo, Yo Gotti, Nicki Minaj	Burrrprint (2) HD
"Identify"	2010	Young Buck	Back On My Buck Shit Vol. 2: Change Of Plans
"One Minute"	2011	Future	True Story
"Stunt"	2011	OJ da Juiceman, Lil Jon	Culinary Art School 2
"I Got Yo Bitch"	2011	Future	Dirty Sprite
"Pajamas"	2011	Future	Dirty Sprite
"Call the Squad for Him"	2011	Waka Flocka Flame	Benjamin Flocka
"Go"	2011	Gucci Mane, Future	Free Bricks
"Make Make Money"	2011	Yo Gotti, Dirty Yella, Alley Boy, Lucky Lansky	Definition of a Trap Nigga
"In My Business"	2011	Gucci Mane, Waka Flocka Flame	Ferrari Boyz
"Can't Get Enough"	2011	Young Scooter	Finessin & Flexin
"I See Ghosts"	2012	T.I., Future	F*ck Da City Up
"Blow"	2012	Future, Ludacris	Astronaut Status
"Waterslide"	2012	Gucci Mane, Young Ralph	—N/a
"Levi Jeans"	2012	Drumma Boy, 2 Chainz	The Birth Of D-Boy Fresh
"Plain Jane"	2012	Gucci Mane	Trap Back
"Chicken Room"	2012	Gucci Mane	Trap Back
"Plain Jane" (Remix)	2012	Gucci Mane, T.I.	I'm Up
"U Don't Deserve Dat" (Remix)	2012	Trouble, Gucci Mane, Travis Porter	—N/a
"MVP"	2012	Shawty Lo, Gucci Mane	Million Dollar Man
"Mouf"	2012	Gucci Mane	Gucci 3D
"Tru'z & Louie'z"	2012	Mr.704, Sean Paul, Tavares	Gotta Sack Before You Ball
"BFF"	2012	Mook	—N/a
"Street Stars"	2012	Chill Will	Real Shit
"Fuck It Up"	2012	Bloody Jay, Chief Keef	Blatlanta (Bigger Than Rap)
"Play With Me"	2012	Bloody Jay, Gucci Mane	Blatlanta (Bigger Than Rap)
"And You Know This "	2012	Cartier	The Streets Know
"You Wonder"	2013	Future, Busta Rhymes	F.B.G.: The Movie
"Chosen One"	2013	Future	F.B.G.: The Movie
"Get The Doe"	2013	Gucci Mane	Trap God 2
"Who Gives A Phuck"	2013	Cash Out	—N/a
"Impossible"	2013	Stuey Rock	Shwaggaban
"First Love"	2013	Casino, Doe Boy	Ex Drug Dealer
"Tryna Do My thing"	2013	SBOE, Yo Gotti	All We Got Is Us
"In Da Mixx"	2013	Dorrough	Shut The City Down
"Do's and Dont's"	2013	Gucci Mane	World War 3: Molly
"Make It Make Sense"	2025	Metro Boomin	A Futuristic Summa

== Music videos ==
List of music videos, with directors, showing year released
Title	Year	Director(s)
"Umma Do Me"	2008	Rich Newey
"Tomorrow"	2008	Juwan Lee
"Dis Morning"	2008	Gabriel Hart
"Really Like Her"	2008	Chris Bridges
"Lingo"	2009	Rodney Hill
"Maybe"	2011	Stewart Parris
"Just In Case"	2011	William Roberts
"Goin' Steady"	2011	—N/a
"Goin' Steady" (Remix)	2011	—N/a
"Balance"	2011	—N/a
"Squares Out Your Circle"	2011	G Visuals
"M's"	2012	Cricket
"Feel Guud"	2013	Cricket
