= Drumma Boy production discography =

The following is a list of songs produced, co-produced and remixed by American record producer, Drumma Boy.

== Production credits ==
=== 2002 ===
Tela - Double Dose

- 05. "Tennessee Titans" (Feat. Yo Gotti, Haystak, Gangsta Boo & Project Playaz)
- 09. "Wangin'" (Feat. Lo Key, Papa Rue & StreetBoy)
- 14. "Strive"

=== 2003 ===
Gangsta Boo - Enquiring Minds II: The Soap Opera

- 02. "Sippin & Spinnin (Remix)" (feat. Bun B & Playa Fly)
- 05. "City Streets"
- 00. "Frenemies"
- 00. "Fuck Boy" (feat. Rich Boy)

Yo Gotti - Life

- 09. "Entering the Game" (Produced with The Rap Hustlaz and Yo Gotti)
- 10. "Life" (feat. Ericka Kane) (Produced with The Rap Hustlaz and Yo Gotti)
- 13. "Shake It" (feat. Rich Bum) (Produced with The Rap Hustlaz and Yo Gotti)
- 15. "On da Grind" (Produced with The Rap Hustlaz and Yo Gotti)
- 16. "U Understand" (feat. T-Stit) (Produced with The Rap Hustlaz and Yo Gotti)

=== 2005 ===
Boyz n da Hood - Boyz n da Hood

- "Look"
- "Trap Niggaz"

Young Jeezy - Let's Get It: Thug Motivation 101

- 02. "Standing Ovation"

=== 2006 ===
DJ Drama & Young Jeezy - You Can't Ban The Snowman

- "Ya Dig"

Gucci Mane - Chicken Talk

- 01. "Work Ya Wrist" (feat.; Gucci Mane - The Movie)
- 16. "How Hood Is This?" (feat. Yo Gotti)

Lil Scrappy - Bred 2 Die Born 2 Live

- 16. "Like Me"

Pastor Troy - Stay Tru

- "Police Can't Break It Up"

Pastor Troy - By Choice or By Force

- "I Represent This (Can I Get a Witness)"
- "Drop That Ass"
- "Partner In Crime" (feat. Misha)

Yo Gotti - Back 2 Da Basics

- 01. "Thats Whats Up (Intro)"
- 16. "Warrior"

Young Jeezy - The Inspiration

- 08. "The Realest"

=== 2007 ===
Boyz n da Hood - Back Up n da Chevy

- "Paper" (feat. Rick Ross)

DJ Drama - Gangsta Grillz: The Album

- "Gangsta Grillz" (feat. Lil Jon)
- "187" (feat. Project Pat, B.G. & 8 Ball & MJG)

Gorilla Zoe - Welcome to the Zoo

- 01. "Do Something"
- 05. "Crack Muzik (This That Muzik)" (feat. Jody Breeze)
- 11. "Juice Box" (feat. Yung Joc)
- 14. "Lil Shawty"

Paul Wall - Get Money, Stay True

- 11. "Gimme That"

Pastor Troy - Tool Muziq

- 14. "Will He Come Home Tonight?"

Playaz Circle - Supply & Demand

- 06. "We Workin'"

Scarface - Made

- 02. "Never"

U.S.D.A - Cold Summer

- 02. "White Girl"
- 08. "Quickie"
- 14. "Go Getta (Remix)" (feat. R. Kelly, Jadakiss & Bun B)

Yung Joc - Hustlenomics

- "Livin' the Life" (feat. Southern Girl)

=== 2008 ===
Young Jeezy - The Recession

- 06. "Amazin"
- 07. "Hustlaz Ambition"
- 16. "Put On" (feat. Kanye West)

T.I. - Paper Trail

- 03. "Ready for Whatever"
- 08. "My Life Your Entertainment" (Feat. Usher)
- 11. "What Up, What's Haapnin"
- 15. "You Ain't Missin' Nothing"

Ace Hood - Gutta

- "Get 'Em Up"

Blood Raw - My Life: The True Testimony

- "It Feels Good"

Boo (of Boo & Gotti)

- "All In"
- "Gone"

C-Ride

- "Drop The Top (Bezzle)"

Diamond

- "Maserati" (feat. Yung Joc & Teairra Marí)

E-40 - The Ball Street Journal

- 13. "Hood Boy" (feat. Sammie)

Gucci Mane &; Yo Gotti - Definition of a G

- 09. "Put On"

Gucci Mane - The Movie

- "Gangsta Movie"
- "Add It Up"
- "Im A Star"
- "You Know What It Is"
- "Georgia"
- "Photoshoot"
- "Bachelor Pad"
- "Money Tall"
- "Lost My Mind"
- "Show Me"
- "Hot Stuff"
- "Top of The World"

Lil Scrappy

- "Jump"

Lil Wayne & DJ Drama - Dedication 3

- 22. "Put On for the Game" (feat. Tyga & Gudda Gudda)

Plies - Definition of Real

- 01. "I'm Da Man" (feat. Trey Songz)
- 08. "Watch Dis"

Plies - Da REAList

- 05. "Plenty Money"
- 13. "I Chase Paper"

Rick Ross - Trilla

- 06. "Money Make Me Come" (feat. EbonyLove)
- 10. "Here I Am" (feat. Nelly & Avery Storm)

Rocko - Self-Made

- 02. "Umma Do Me"
- 04. "Busy"
- 05. "Tomorrow"
- 06. "Old Skool"
- 08. "Like This Here"
- 11. "Snakes"
- 12. "Meal"
- 13. "Thugs Need Love Too" (feat. Monica)
- 00. "Trap Party"
- 00. "Yeen Talkin Bout Nothin'"
- 00. "Ball Out" (feat. Kristyle)

Sophia Fresh - So Phreakin' Fresh

- "Drop It"

Soulja Boy Tell 'Em - iSouljaBoyTellEm

- 01. "I'm Bout Tha Stax (Intro)"
- 08. "Rubber Bands"
- 16. "I Pray (Outro)"

=== 2009 ===
Birdman - Pricele$$

- "Money To Blow" (feat. Drake & Lil Wayne)

Bow Wow - New Jack City II

- "Pole In My Basement"

Diamond - The Black Barbie

- "Massaratti" (feat. Dorrough)
- "Role Model" (feat. Nicole Wray)

DJ Drama - Gangsta Grillz 2: The Album

- 05. "Day Dreamin'" (feat. Akon, Snoop Dogg & T.I.)
- 13. "Gotta Get It" (feat. B.G., Juvenile & Soulja Slim)

Gangsta Boo & DJ Drama - The Rumors

- 04. "We Did Dat" (featuring Gucci Mane)
- 05. "Booty Switch" (featuring Shawnna)
- 06. "Posse Song" (featuring Drum Squad)
- 10. "Bitch Don't Look At Me" (featuring Lachat)
- 12. "Call Me" (featuring J-Bar)
- 13. "M.E.M.P.H.I.S." (featuring Crunchy Black, 8Ball & MJG & Raw Talent)
- 14. "Blow It Out" (featuring Kristyle)
- 15. "Laughen At Em"
- 17. "Necessary"

Gorilla Zoe - Don't Feed Da Animals

- 04. "Lost"
- 09. "I Got It" (feat. Big Block)
- 14. "Echo"

Gucci Mane - Bird Flu: Part 2

- 21. "Photoshoot"

Gucci Mane - Writing on the Wall

- 20. "Everything" (feat. Supa & Yung LA)

Gucci Mane - The Movie: Part 2 (The Sequel)

- "Pressure"
- "Burr"
- "Gucci"
- "Overboard"
- "Awesome"
- "Ain't Nothing Else To Do"

Gucci Mane - Burrrprint: 3D (The Movie: Part 3)

- 04. "Watch Cost A Bentley" (feat. Bun B & Rocko)
- 07. "Yelp, I Got All Of That"
- 09. "My Shadow"
- 13. "More" (feat. Kandi and Sean Ceasar)

Gucci Mane - The Cold War: Part 1 (Guccimerica)

- "Follow Me"
- "Boiy"

Gucci Mane - The Cold War: Part 3 (Brussia)

- "Party Animal" (feat. Snoop Dogg)

Gucci Mane - Wasted: The Prequel

- "Photo Shoot"

Gucci Mane - The State vs. Radric Davis

- 01. "Classical (Intro)"
- 05. "All About the Money" (feat. Rick Ross)
- 17. "Kush Is My Cologne" (feat. Bun B, Devin the Dude & E-40)
- 18. "Worst Enemy"

Juicy J & Project Pat - Cut Throat

- "Take Whats Comin Wit It"

Juice

- "Crush My Cool" (feat. Bun B)

Rick Ross - Deeper Than Rap

- 12. "Face" (feat. Trina)

Triple C's - Custom Cars & Cycles

- 06. "Trickn Off" (feat. Gucci Mane)
- 15. "Yams Pt. 2" (feat. Yo Gotti)

Young Buck - Only God Can Judge Me

- 02. "Without Me" (featuring 8 Ball & MJG)

Yung Joc - Mr. Robinson's Neighborhood

- "All Dat Ass" (feat. Wale & Young Dose)
- "What's Really Good"
- "Watch Me Make A Movie" (feat. DJ Khaled)

=== 2010 ===
Jamie Drastik - The Magnet

- "Whiter Then Blow"

2 Chainz - Trap-A-Velli 2: (The Residue)

- "Check Me Out"
- "Boo" (feat. Yo Gotti)
- "Issues" (ft. Young Buck)
- "Been Hustlin"
- "Doin Me Daily" (ft. Cap 1)
- "Between Me & You (ft. Lil Keke & Gudda Gudda)

8 Ball & MJG - Ten Toes Down

- "Ten Toes Down"
- "It's Goin' Down"
- "Life Goes On" (feat. Slim Thug)
- "Still Will Remain"

Bun B - Trill OG

- "Just Like That" (feat. Young Jeezy)

DJ Drama & OJ Da Juiceman - O.R.A.N.G.E.

- "When I Get Big"
- "Touchdown"
- "Party Started"

DJ Paul - Too Kill Again

- "Stick Em Up" (feat. DJ Zirk)

Dorrough - Get Big

- "Hood Bitch" (feat. Yo Gotti & Gorilla Zoe)

Giggs - Let Em Ave It

- 06. "Get Your Money Up"

Gorilla Zoe - I Am Atlanta 3

- "Body Bag"

Gucci Mane - The Appeal: Georgia's Most Wanted

- 04. "What It's Gonna Be"
- 14. "Weirdo"

Gucci Mane - Burrrprint (2) HD

- 02. "Intro Live From Fulton County Jail HD"
- 04. "Boy From The Block"
- 07. "Gucci On The Rise"
- 10. "Everybody Looking"
- 12. "Coca Coca" (feat. Rocko, OJ Da Juiceman, Waka Flocka Flame, Shawty Lo, Yo Gotti & Nicki Minaj)
- 14. "Here We Go Again"
- 16. "Antisocial" (feat. Mylah)
- 17. "Beat It Up" (feat. Trey Songz)
- 19. "911 Emergency"
- 23. "I'm So Tired Of You"
- 24. "Outro Live From Fulton County Jail HD"

Gucci Mane - Mr. Zone 6

- "Normal"
- "Dats My Life"
- "Stove Music" (feat. Waka Flocka Flame)

Gucci Mane - Jewelry Selection

- "Cleopatra"
- "Gross"
- "Stone Cold"
- "Don't Believe Me"

Gucci Mane - Ferrari Music

- "Late'
- "Better Baby"
- "No Hands (Remix) feat. Waka Flocka Flame & Roscoe Dash"

Lil Jon - Crunk Rock

- 02. "Throw It Up Pt. 2" (feat. Pastor Troy) (Co-produced by Lil Jon)
- 04. "On De Grind" (feat. Damian & Stephen Marley) (Co-produced by Lil Jon)
- 10. "Ms. Chocolate" (feat. R. Kelly & Mario) (Co-produced by Lil Jon)

Monica - Still Standing

- "How I Like It" (feat. Rocko)

OJ Da Juiceman - The Realest Nigga I Know

- "Pull Up"
- "He Dead"

OJ Da Juiceman - Bouldercrest Shawty

- "When I Get Big"
- "Kickin It"
- "Tonka"

Rocko - Wild Life

- 18. "Lord Have Mercy"
- 19. "All Wayz"

Rocko - Rocko Dinero

- "I Salute You"
- "Goin Steady"

Snoop Dogg - More Malice

- 04. "House Shoes"

Usher - Versus EP

- 09. "Stranger"

Waka Flocka Flame - Flockaveli

- 05. "No Hands" (feat. Roscoe Dash & Wale)

Young Buck - Back On My Buck Shit Vol. 2: Change Of Plans

- 01. "Let Me Go"
- 02. "Came Back"
- 03. "Got Me One"
- 04. "In The Clouds"
- 05. "AM/FM" (featuring Lupe Fiasco)
- 06. "Cleaned Off" (featuring The Outlawz)
- 07. "Betta Tell Em" (featuring 8Ball)
- 08. "Identify" (featuring Rocko)
- 09. "U Know What It Is" (featuring MJG & 2 Chainz)
- 10. "I'm Done Wit Yall"
- 11. "Mark Barton"
- 12. "The Blues" (featuring The Game)
- 13. "Gettin It"
- 14. "Lockdown"
- 15. "The Streets"
- 16. "Down Wit Em"
- 17. "Taxin"
- 18. "Round Me" (Drumma Boy featuring Young Buck & 8Ball & MJG)

Young Dolph - Welcome To Dolph World

- "Flavor"
- "I'm Blessed" (feat. 2 Chainz)

Yo Gotti - Cocaine Muzik 4 Both Sides Both Stories

- 07. "Any N*gga" (feat. Yung LA, Starlito & J Futuristic)
- 12. "Touchdown"

Yo Gotti - Cocaine Muzik 4.5 (Da Documentary)

- 10. "White World"

Yo Gotti - Cocaine Muzik 5 White Friday

- 03. "It's On" (feat. Starlito & Zed Zilla)
- 09. "We Can Get It On" (feat. Ciara)
- 12. "What's Wrong With You" (feat. Starlito & Zed Zilla)

Young Jeezy - Trap or Die 2 Part 2: By Any Means Necessary

- 05. "Problem"
- 07. "Lose My Mind" (feat. Plies

=== 2011 ===
2 Chainz - Codeine Cowboy: A 2 Chainz Collective

- "Role Model" (feat. Dolla Boy)
- "Spend It"
- "Boo" (feat. Yo Gotti)

2 Chainz - T.R.U. REALigion

- "Turn Up" ft. Cap-1
- "Spend It" ft. T.I.
- "Slangin' Birds" ft. Young Jeezy, Yo Gotti & Birdman
- "Addicted To Rubberbands" ft. J Hard

DJ 5150 & OJ Da Juiceman - Cook Muzik

- 00. "Hustle & Grind" (feat. Allie Baby)

DJ Drama - Third Power

- 01. "Oh My" (feat. Roscoe Dash, Fabolous & Wiz Khalifa)
- 07. "Me & My Money" (feat. Gucci Mane)
- 12. "Oh My" (Remix) (feat. Trey Songz, 2 Chainz & Big Sean

DJ Drama & Young Jeezy - The Real Is Back

- 08. "Flexin' " (feat. Fabolous & Yo Gotti)

The Game - The R.E.D. Album

- 00. "Pussy Fight" (feat. Ester Dean & Ray J) (Leftover track)

Gorilla Zoe - Don’t Feed da Animals prequel, Feeding Time

- "I Like Girls"

Gorilla Zoe - King Kong

- "King Kong"
- "Party Over Here"

Gucci Mane - Gucci 2 Time

- "Hell Yeah" (feat. Slim Dunkin)
- "Valentine Day" (feat. Bricksquad Monopoly)
- "Trick Or Treat" (feat. Bricksquad Monopoly)

Gucci Mane - The Return of Mr. Zone 6

- 01. "24 Hours"
- 02. "Mouth Full of Gold" (feat. Birdman)
- 03. "This Is What I Do" (feat. Waka Flocka Flame & OJ Da Juiceman)
- 04. "Reckless" (feat. Lil Capp & Chill Will)
- 07. "Better Baby"
- 08. "Brinks" (feat. Master P)
- 09. "Pretty Bitches" (feat. Wale)
- 10. "Pancakes" (feat. Waka Flocka Flame & 8Ball)
- "Hell Yeah" (feat. Slim Dunkin)
- 12. "My Year"
- 13. "Trick or Treat" (feat. Slim Dunkin, Wooh Da Kid & Waka Flocka Flame)

Gucci Mane & Bricksquad Monopoly - Bricksquad Mafia

- "Respect My Name" (feat. Yung Joc)
- "Fly Away"
- "Mouth Full Of Gold" (feat. Birdman)

Gucci Mane - Writings On The Wall 2

- 09. "Translation" (featuring Cartel & Yo Gotti)
- 10. "Tax Free"
- 13. "Guilty" (featuring Young Buck)
- 15. "Too Turnt Up" (featuring Yelawolf)
- 16. "MVP" (featuring Jagged Edge)
- 18. "Recently" (featuring 50 Cent)
- 19. "Yesterday"

Gucci Mane & Waka Flocka Flame - Ferrari Boyz

- 01. "Ferrari Boyz"
- 15. "What the Hell" (feat. Rocko)

Gucci Mane & Future - Free Bricks

- 04. "Stevie Wonder"

Jagged Edge - The Remedy

- 13. "Never Meant To Lead You On"

Juicy J - Blue Dream & Lean

- "Big Bank" (feat. Key)
- "Countin Faces"

Kid Ink - Daydreamer Leftover

- "Turn it Out"

Nelly - O.E.M.O

- "Country Azz Nigga" (feat. T.I. & 2 Chainz)

Rocko

- 00. "Goin' Steady (Remix)" (feat. Plies)

Shawty Lo - B.H.F. (Bankhead Forever)

- 15. "Bigger Picture" (ft. Future)

Starlito - Ultimate Warrior

- 05. "Wake Up" (featuring Young Buck)
- 12. "Somebody Lied To Me"
- 13. "Ain't Worried Bout You"
- 16. "Do It For Me"
- 17. "Stuck Wit Ya" (featuring Robin Raynelle)

Starlito & Don Trip - Step Brothers Two

- 05. "Shut Up"

Soulja Boy Tell 'Em - 1 UP

- "Performance"

Tinie Tempah - Happy Birthday

- 05. "Till I'm Gone" (Remix) (feat. Wiz Khalifa, Pusha T & Jim Jones)

Trae - Street King

- 01. "Strapped Up" (feat. Pyrexx)

USDA - CTE or Nothing

- 11. "The Lick"

Waka Flocka Flame - Salute Me or Shoot Me 3 (Hip Hops Outcast)

- "Ferrari Boyz" (feat. Gucci Mane)

Waka Flocka Flame & Slim Dunkin - Twin Towers 2 (No Fly Zone)

- 13. "Fresh As F*uck" (feat. Gucci Mane and Rocko)

Wiz Khalifa - Cabin Fever

- 01. "Phone Numbers" (feat. Trae & Big Sean)

Wiz Khalifa & Snoop Dogg - Mac & Devin Go to High School

- 01. "Smoking On" (feat. Juicy J)

Young Dolph - High Class Street Music 2: (Hustlers Paradise)

- 02. "Hustlers Paradise"
- 10. "Bounce" (feat. Drumma Boy)
- 16. "Chances"
- 17. "Long Money"

Young Jeezy - Thug Motivation 103: Hustlerz Ambition

- 02. "What I Do (Just Like That)"
- 17. "Lose My Mind" (feat. Plies)
- 00. "Talk To Me" (feat. Eminem & Freddie Gibbs)

Yo Gotti - January 10th: The Mixtape

- 06. "I Got Dat Sack" (Got Dem Racks)
- 08. "Real N*ggas"

Young Scooter - Finessin And Flexin

- "Boosie"

=== 2012 ===
2 Chainz - Based on a T.R.U. Story

- 10. "Money Machine"

Chris Brown - Fortune

- "Oh Yeah" (ft. 2 Chainz & Snoop Dogg) (non-album single)

Gucci Mane - Trap Back

- 11. "Thank You"
- 18. "Sometimes" (featuring Future)

Gucci Mane - I'm Up

- 02. "I'm Up" (featuring 2 Chainz)
- 07. "Brought Out Them Racks" (featuring Big Sean)
- 10. "Anytime You Ready" (featuring Birdman)
- 18. "It Ain't Funny" (featuring Yo Gotti)
- 19. "Put On a Show"

Gucci Mane - Trap God

- 04. "Crazy" (featuring Waka Flocka Flame)

Lil Scrappy - The Grustle

- "Stunt On Dem Niggaz" (feat. Lil Jon)
- "Expensive"

MGK - Lace Up

- 04. "Lace Up" (feat. Lil Jon)

Plies - On Trial

- "14. No Pressure"

Shawty Lo - The Best Of Shawty Lo

- 04. "Atlanta GA" (feat. Ludacris, Gucci Mane and The Dream)

Wiz Khalifa - O.N.I.F.C.

- 03. "Bluffin" (feat. Berner)
- 10. "It's Nothin" (feat. 2 Chainz)

Yo Gotti - Live from the Kitchen

- 10. "We Can Get it On"

Young Buck - Live Loyal Die Rich

- 12. "Think They Know"

Young Buck - Strictly 4 Traps N Trunks 44: Free Young Buck Edition

- 01. "This Shit Rough"
- 02. "Re-Up" (featuring 8Ball & MJG)
- 04. "Kill Something"
- 08. "Peep Hole" (featuring Charlie P)
- 09. "Betta Know It" (featuring B.G.)
- 10. "I'ont Know" (featuring DJ Paul)
- 11. "Cut You Off"

Young Buck & Tha City Paper - G.a.S – Gangsta and Street

- 15. "I Don't Know"

Young Dolph - A Time 2 Kill

- "Booked Up" (feat. Gucci Mane)

Young Dolph - Blue Magic

- "While I'm Rollin Up" (feat. 8 Ball & MJG)
- "Call Me Back"
- "Bad Girl"
- "My Real Life" (feat. Gucci Mane)

Yung Bleu - Hello World

- "Go Head"

=== 2013 ===
2 Chainz - B.O.A.T.S. II: Me Time

- 09. "U Da Realest"

Bow Wow - Greenlight 5 Mixtape

- "Heart Stop "

Cash Out - Drumma Boy 2k13 Spring Bling Playlist

- "Round & Round"

Daz Dillinger - Weed Money

- 00. "Love 2 Hate"

DJ Paul & & Drumma Boy - Clash Of The Titans

- "Yeah Yeah (Intro)"
- "Clash Of The Titans" (feat. 8 Ball)
- "End Of The Day"
- "Gimme Room"

EDIDON - O.G. Est. 1992

- 05. "Tonite" (featuring Young Buck, Hussein Fatal & Young Noble)

Gangsta Boo - It's Game Involved

- 02. "Dark Shades"
- 04. "Talk Nasty" (featuring Young Buck)
- 11. "Pillow Talk" (featuring 8 Ball & Maino)
- 12. "Ride 4 My Boo" (featuring Trouble Andrews & Don Trip)

Gucci Mane - Trap God 2

- 14. "Can't Interfere Wit My Money" (ft. OG Boo Dirty)

Gucci Mane - Trap House III

- 07. F*ck With Me
- 11. D.I.G.
- 17. Nobody

Gucci Mane - The State vs. Radric Davis II: The Caged Bird Sings

- 04. "Rude"

Gucci Mane & Young Scooter - Free Bricks 2

- "Keep Workin"

Gucci Mane - Drumma Boy's 2K13 4th Of July Playlist

- "Fuck Wit Me"

Gucci Mane - Diary Of A Trap God

- 22. "Cold Hearted" (feat. Kevin McCall)

Gucci Mane - World War 3, Vol.3: Gas

- 10.. "Drummaguwopuhhh" (feat. Kandi)

Lil Mister - Hi Haters

- 02. "Insane"
- 14. "3 Limits"

Lil Nuke - Maurice Jackson Story

- 14. "Yes I Do" (feat. Ca$h Out)

LoLa Monroe - Lipsticks & Pistols

- "Makaveli" (ft. Juicy J)

Project Pat - Cheez N Dope

- "Weed Smoke"
- "Sackful" feat. Nasty Mane
- "I Ain't Seen Shit"
- "Weed Smoke (Remix)" feat. Mac Miller

Project Pat - Cheez N Dope 2

- "Flippin N Stackin"
- "Kick Door"
- "Chiefin" (feat. Wiz Khalifa)
- "No Mirage"
- "Gettin Cash" (feat. Juicy J)
- "I'm In This Club" (feat. Nasty Mane)
- "Where The F*ck"

Rocko- Gift of Gab 2

- 07. One Two

Tech N9ne - Something Else

- 13. "See Me" (featuring B.o.B. & Wiz Khalifa)
- 22. "Colorado" (featuring B.o.B., Ces Cru, Krizz Kaliko, ¡Mayday!, Rittz & Stevie Stone)

Turk - Blame It On The System

- "Blame It On The System" (ft. Gunplay)

Turk - Louisianimalz Vol. 1

- "Dat Water" feat. Donkey Bad Ass King

Waka Flocka Flame - DuFlocka Rant: Halftime Show

- 16. "Seen Alot" (feat. Fetti Gangand and Wooh da Kid)

Young Dolph - High Class Street Music 3 (Trappin Out A Mansion)

- "Any Many Miny Moe"
- "Get This Money" (feat. 2 Chainz)
- "I Survived"
- "On My Line"
- "No Sleep"
- "Trappin Out A Mansion"

Young Dolph - South Memphis Kingpin

- 14. "Rich N*gga"(feat. Tim Gates)
- 16. "Get This Money" (feat. 2 Chainz)

Young Jeezy -ItsThaWorld EP

- 06. "4 What" (feat. DJ Drama, Juicy J and Yo Gotti)

Young Jeezy - ItsThaWorld 2

- "Foul Play"

Zone 6 Sinister - Zone 6 Stephen King

- "Gunplay"

=== 2014 ===
August Alsina - Testimony

- "FML" ft. Pusha T
- "No Love"

Chief Keef & Gucci Mane - Big Gucci Sosa

- 02. "Banger"

Chris Brown - X

- 00. "Wildcat"

Gangsta Boo & La Chat - Witch

- 03. "Til the Day"
- 04. "On That" (ft. Lil Wyte)
- 09. "Sweet Robbery"

Gucci Mane - Trap House 4

- 02. "Already"
- 11. "Dope Love"

Gucci Mane - Trap God 3

- 05. "I Don't Do Roofs"

Gucci Mane - East Atlanta Santa

- 05. "Go"
- 10. "Odd Ball" featuring OJ da Juiceman
- 15. "One Day At a Time (Outro)"

Gucci Mane - The Return Of Mr. Perfect

- "Ambulance"

Kap G - Like A Mexican

- "Jose Got Dem Tacos" (ft. Young Jeezy)
- "We Mobbin" (ft. Young Dolph)

Ledisi - The Truth

- "Rock With You" (produced with Jerry 'Wonder' Duplessis)

Master P - The Gift Vol. 1: Return of The Ice Cream Man

- 05. "What You Thought"
- 06. "No Way"

Project Pat - Cheez N Dope 3: Street God

- "Pistol and a Scale"
- "What You Said" (ft. Young Scooter)

Young Dolph & Young Scooter - Road Runners Mixtape

- "Workin Out"

Young Dolph - High Class Street Music 4 (American Gangster)

- "Dollar Signs"
- "Young Nigga" (feat. Fiend)

Young Dolph - Cross Country Trappin

- 04. "Get This Money" (feat. 2 Chainz)

Young Jeezy - Seen It All: The Autobiography

- 05. "Me OK"

=== 2015 ===
Chris Brown & Tyga - Fan of a Fan: The Album

- 04. "Girl You Loud"

Chris Brown - Before the Party

- 16. "Freaky Sh*t"

Drumma Boy - #MyFashion

- 02."Phamily Over Everything" (ft. Young Dolph and J Fizzle)
- 07 "Gotta Do" (ft. Wave Chapelle)
- 02 "Fresh As F*ck" (ft. Gucci Mane, Slim Dunkin & Rocko)
- 17 "2 Tha Top" (ft. L.I. Tha Great)
- 12 "Fly Niggaz" (ft. 2. Playa Fly and Mac Sleepy)
- 13 "Fashion" (ft. Snootie Wild)

Gucci Mane - 1017 Mafia: Incarcerated

- "1017 Mafia" (ft. Young Thug)

Gucci Mane - Mr Clean, The Middle Man

- 01. "Mr Clean The Middle Man (Intro)"

Gucci Mane - Breakfast

- 02. "Ain't Got Time"
- 03. "Tell Dem Boyz"
- 11. "Losin"

Gucci Mane - Lunch

- 03. "Money Scheme"

Gucci Mane - Dinner

- 11. "Work"

Migos - Back to the Bando

- 00. "Bitch Dab"

Rich the Kid - Dabbin Fever

- 07. "Listen" (ft. Skippa Da Flippa, HoodRich Pablo Juan)

Scotty ATL - The Cooligan

- 05. "Cannon Ball"

Soulja Boy Tell 'Em - Promise

- 12. "Blast Gang (Code Red)" (featuring Hurricane Chris, 50 Cent & Busta Rhymes)

Young Buck - Before The Beast

- 03. "Been Dat Nigga"
- 06. "Push"

Young Buck - 10 Bullets

- 04. "Dope Boy"

Frenchie - Long Over Due 2

- 13. "Greenlight" (ft. Gudda Gudda & Turk)

Young Dolph - High Class Street Music 5

- "What I Gotta Do"
- "Forever"
- "Make The World Go Round"
- "All Mine"

Young Dolph - South Memphis Kingpin

- 09. "Get Blow'd"
- 14. "Rich Nigga" (ft. Tim Gates)
- 16. "Get This Money" (ft. 2 Chainz)

SD - Life Of A Savage 4

- 05. "Blessed"

Young Dolph - 16 Zips

- 01. "Boyz In Da Hood"
- 11. "Everyday 420"
- 13. "Addicted "(ft. Jadakiss)

Hurricane Chris - Hurricane Season

- 09. "To The Money"

Jucee Froot - Diamond In The Rough

- 03. "Petty MFS (Remix)"

J. Money - Sauce 4 Sale

- "Come On"

JMoney Trulla - Trulla World 2

- 07. "Young Nigga Sht" (ft. Snootie Wild & Zed Zilla)

Scott King

- "FTS"

=== 2016 ===
KiD - All Black Winter

- 01. "King In Demand"

Lil Reese - 300 Degrees

- 01. "Sum New" ( produced with Suber )

MoneyBaggYo - Federal Reloaded

- 22. "Animals" (feat. Y.Gizzle & Fengshui)

Project Pat - Street God 2

- 07. "Bag" (ft. King Ray)

Yo Gotti - The Art of Hustle

- 11. "Imagine Dat"

Ace Boogie - Exit 8

- 14. "Strip"

Gucci Mane - Everybody Looking

- 13. "All My Children"

Gucci Mane - Meal Ticket

- 02. "Ain't Got Time"
- 03. "Tell Dem Boyz"
- 11. "Losin" (Produced with Will A Fool)
- 03. "Money Scheme" (ft. Cartier Kitten)
- 33. "Work" (ft. Strap)

Gucci Mane - Greatest Mixtape Hits

- 08. "Worst Enemy"
- 10. "Awesome" (ft. Snoop Dogg)
- 12. "Slumber Party" (ft. Nicki Minaji)
- 20. "Anytime" (ft. Birdman)
- 25. "Crazy" (ft. Waka Flocka Flame)
- 40. "No Hands (Remix)" (ft. Waka Flocka Flame & Roscoe Dash)
- 48. "Sometimes" (ft. Future)
- 56. "Self Made (Remix)" by K Michelle (ft. Gucci Mane) (Produced With Miguel Rico Law Jiminez)

Gucci Mane - Free Gucci: The Release (Vol.1)

- 08. "Going Steady (Remix)" by Rocko (ft. Plies)
- 18. "Work Ya Wrist" (ft. Yo Gotti)
- 21. "No Hands (Remix) (ft. Roscoe Dash & Waka Flocka Flame)

Gucci Mane - Free Gucci: The Release (Vol.2)

- 12. How Hood Is This (ft. Yo Gotti)

Bay Bay The Ambassador

- 00. "Trap Holiday" (ft. Young Greatness)

SwayvoMetro

- 00. "Fuego" (ft. Huncho Jones)

iHateFreco - I Hate Freco Reloaded

- 05. "About A Min" (ft. Nyne O'Nyne)

Gucci Mane - Woptober

- 12. Out the Zoo

Don Trip - Guerrilla

- "Like Me" ( produced with DP Beatz and Suber )

Cool Courtney - The Mud Mixtape

- "OG Speaks / The Mud"

Curren$y - Andretti 12/30

- 06. "There Go The Man" (ft. Corner Boy P)

Young Dolph - Bosses & Shooters

- 03. "Bosses & Shooters" (ft. Jay Fizzle and Bino Brown)

Young Dolph - King of Memphis

- 04. "Both Ways"

=== 2017 ===
Young Dolph - Bulletproof

- 05. "That's How I Feel" (ft. Gucci Mane)

Young Dolph - Thinking Out Loud

- 10. "While U Here"

Young Dolph - Gelato

- 07. "Yeezy"

Yo Gotti - I Still Am

- 12. "Don't Wanna Go Back"

Chris Brown & Ray J - Burn My Name

- 09. "Famous"

Scotty ATL & Drumma Boy - Who Shot Cupid

- 01. "Ball Out" (ft. Carlon Syl)
- 03. "Marry Me" (Wayyy Betta)
- 04. "Pull Up" (ft. Que)
- 05. "Kudos"
- 06. "I Dream" (ft. Young Greatness)
- 07. "Loyal"
- 08. "Sucka Free"
- 09. "No Love In February" (Produced With Bryan Michael Cox)

Scotty ATL - Smoking On My Own Strain

- 04. "Marry Me" (Wayyy Betta)
- 06. "Senorita" (ft. Kap G)

Young Greatness - Bloody Summer

- 01. "Drugs And Money"
- 06. "Pull Up"
- 10. "14U"

Young Greatness

- 00. We "Rollin"

Eastside Jody - Get Rich Or Die Trappin

- 08. "Hands On" (ft. Trick Daddy)
- 13. "Pictures"
- 17. "F*ck It Up"

Doe Boy - Get Rich Or Die Trappin

- 04. "Pack Hit" (ft. Trick Daddy)

=== 2018 ===
YoungBoy Never Broke Again - Until Death Call My Name

- 06. "We Poppin" (ft. Birdman)

Too Short - The Pimp Tape

- 03. "Tables" (ft. 2 Chainz, Snoop Dogg)
- 04. "Ain't My Girfriend" (ft. Ty Dolla $ign, French Montana, Joyner Lucas, Jeremih)

Lil' Keke - Slfmade II

- 11. "Slab on Butter" (ft. Big Pokey, Jack Freeman, Propain)

=== 2020 ===
Gucci Mane - Trap God Classics: I Am My Only Competition

- 05. "I Think I Love Her" (ft. Ester Dean)
- 14. Photoshoot

K Michelle - All Monsters Are Human

- 02. "That Game"

Young Dolph - Rich Slave

- 11. "Rich Slave"

Kevin Gates

- 00. "Give It All I Got"

=== 2021 ===
Young Buck - Back On My Buck Shit Vol. 3

- 00. Produced All Tracks

Noochie

- 00. "Move"

=== 2022 ===
Young Dolph - Paper Route Frank

- 08. "Smoke My Weed"

=== 2023 ===
Noochie - Sneaky Tape 2

- 03. "Power"
- 07. "Cut'Em Off"

=== 2024 ===
Kevin Gates - The Ceremony

- 14. "Do It Again"

Megan Thee Stallion - Megan: Act II

- 09. "Motion" (Produced with Chriz Beatz and 2C’s

=== 2025 ===
K Carbon - H.B.I.C.

- 07. "Aw Yeah"
- 09. "H.B.I.C."

Bak Jay & FBG Murda - Youngest In Charge

- 07. "Demons" (Produced with BeatsByAvery, AyeJayMadeit and Paperroute2cs)
- 09. "Ion Know" (Produced with Chriz Beatz and Paperroute2cs)

Bak Jay - Letters I Never Sent

- 13. "Another One" (Produced with BeatsByAvery)

=== TBA ===
DJ Drama - Quality Street Music 2

- "4 What" feat. Young Jeezy, Yo Gotti & Juicy J

Juelz Santana - Born to Lose, Built to Win

- 00. "Home Run" (feat. Lil Wayne)

Project Pat - Cheez N Dope 4

- "Mack Shyt" (ft. Fat Trel and Big Trill)

=== Others ===
4 Mill

- "Executively Thuggin"

47 Mobb - It Iz What It Iz

- "What It's Gone B" (feat. Yung Kee)

9th Ward

- "Supermodel"

Allie Baby - Study Hall

- "Lacing"
- "New Year"
- "Bonita"
- "Wtl"
- "Bounce That Ass"
- "Stompng Ground "
- "Sarah Lee"
- "Cruisin"
- "Catch Me"
- "Made Bitches"
- "Ghetto"
- "Mod"
- "He Got It"
- "Da Stamp"

Alley Boy

- "Ima Smash It" (feat. Gucci Mane)

Bettie Grind

- "Dammit I'm Flllyyyy"
- "Hello"

Big HoodBoss

- "Str8 DumB" (feat. Slim Thug)
- "I Got Action" feat. 2 Chainz)
- "How I Rock" ft. Rocko & Young Chase

Billy Blue

- "Official" (feat. Bobby Valentino)

Bohagon - The Victory Lap

- "Go Blind"

Busta Rhymes

- "Pewwn" (feat. Spliff Star)

Chris Brown - Forward Fortune (In My Zone 2.5) Mixtape

- "One More Time"
- "Fuck The City Up"
- "See Through"
- "Drop It" ft. OHB
- "How I Feel"

CyHi Da Prynce

- "Sideways"

Criminal Mane - Welcome To My City 2

- "TN Boyz" (feat. Young Buck & Don Trip)

DJ JSess - Purple Diesel 4

- Bring Them Thangs" (ft. Gucci Mane, Bankroll Fresh & Chief Keef) (prod with Zaytoven)

Don Trip

- "Green & Purple" (feat. Young Dolph)

Eastside Jody - I Pledge Allegiance To Tha Trap

- "Known In The Hood"
- "Counterfeit"
- "All I Need"
- "Get Rich"
- "Everywhere"
- "Draw Da Line"
- "Money"
- "Only Understand Money"
- "Breakin Down Bricks"
- "Espanol"

Ebony Love

- "She Me"

Euro Mil - Strictly 4 The Traps N Trunks 40 (Hosted By Jackie Chain)

- "Trophies" ft. Young Dolph

Flo Rida

- Keep It Pouring

Future - Future Hendrix

- Usual (What I Usually Do)

Gangsta Blac - Return of the Gangsta

- "Yea Boi"

Gloss Da Boss – Gloss World (The Evolution)

- "Bosses Code"

Goapele

- "Right Here"

Gucci Mane - Gucci La Flare

- "Mo Money"

Gucci Mane

- "East Atlanta Memphis" (feat. Yo Gotti, Juicy J, Project Pat, & Kingpin Skinny Pimp)
- "It's Over"
- "30 Years 30 Million"
- "Shopaholic"
- "Slumber Party"
- "2 Timez" (feat. Wiz Khalifa)
- "Burr Burr" (feat. Soulja Boy Tell 'Em & Yo Gotti)
- "Payday" (feat. Game)
- "Still Ain't Tired"
- "MVP" (feat. Jagged Edge)
- "Stevie Wonder" (feat. Future)

Gyft

- "In His Eyes"
- "Party Animal"

HK - Lights Camera Jackin

- "Check Out My Fresh"
- "Move"
- "I Like It"
- "Above The Clouds"
- "I Gets It In"
- "Gangsta"
- "In My Hood"
- "Watch Me Jack"
- "The Way I Do It"
- "Do It Big"
- "Pop Off"

HK

- "So Long" (feat. Young Buck)

J. Futuristic - Whats On My Mind Pt. 1

- "Sensei"

J. Futuristic - Mr. Futuristic 2 (Da Return Of Mr. Miyagi)

- "Intro"
- "Baby I Dont"
- "Classic"
- "Money Dont Make Me"
- "Whats On My Mind"
- "Baow Baow"
- "Auto Pilot"
- "All About My Cash"
- "Lego" (feat. Young Buck)
- "OK Cool"
- "Blowing Money"
- "Can't Come Down"

JBar

- "Call Me" (feat. Gangsta Boo)

J Love

- "Rice Krispy"

Jody Breeze

- "Do Ya Thing"

K. Michelle - Pain Medicine

- "Self Made" (feat. Trina)

Kandi Gurl

- "Fly Above"
- "Trade Him In" (feat. Gucci Mane)

KaliRaps - Mr. Misunderstood

- "Your Too Good"

Killa Kyleon - Dj Zazu & Jonay Presents Dat Duffy Vol. 1 hosted By Lex Luger & Waka Flocka

- "Dopeboy Rich"

King D - Roc Town Massacre

- "Dont Love These Hoes"

Kinfolk Thugs

- "No Doubt" (feat. Kristyle)
- "She Got" (feat. Young Buck, PlayaFly & GK)

Kristyle - Young and Paid

- "Country Boy" ft. (Kinfolk Thugs)

La Chat - Krumbz 2 Brickz

- "Get Doe" (feat. Gucci Mane & Allstar)
- "Don't Look At Me" (feat. Gangsta Boo)
- "Back 2 Da Block"

Lil Twist - Best Teen Rapper Alive

- "Drumma On The Beat"

Lloyd

- "Twerk Off" (feat. Juicy J)
- "Be the One" ft. Trey Songz & Young Jeezy

Kevin Gates - "Bout Dat Life

- "Not Really"

Marsha Ambrosius

- "I Wanna"

Miss B - T.Brewer DJ Krill FREE GAS: Last Call for Alcohol

- "Take A Step Back"

Mista Mac - Dj Zazu & Jonay Presents Dat Duffy Vol. 1 hosted By Lex Luger & Waka Flocka

- "Incredible"

Money Mo

- "I Get Excited (feat. Rick Ross, Charlie Hustle, & Rich Boy)

Mr.PCP

- "Straight To Tha Money"

Musiq Soulchild

- "Waiting Still"

OG Boo Dirty - Born A Soldier, Die A Vet

- "True Religion" (feat. 2 Chainz)

OJ Da Juiceman

- "Diamond Chains"
- "I Got Juice" (feat. Verse Simmons)
- "Keep It Moving" (feat. Allie Baby)

One Chance - One Chance

- "U Can't" (feat. Yung Joc)

P2TheLA - N.W.A.

- "Hunnit"
- "Like This"
- "Eazy E"
- "Coordinate"
- "Lil' Homie"
- "Back to the Future"
- "HBO"
- "Joe Montana"

Playaz Circle

- "Issues" (feat. Young Buck)

Plies - Purple Heart

- "Gossip"

Plies

- "Long Way"

Rich Boy

- "It's Over"
- "Come & Get Me"
- "Fuck Boy" (feat. Gangsta Boo)

Rico Love - The Inauguration Mixtape

- "I'm A Pimp" (feat. Bohagon & Jody Breeze)

Roccett

- "You Ani't Heard"

Slick Pulla

- "Talk Real Slick"

Slim Polk

- "Hood Trak"

Slim the Snapbacker

- "Party Party"
- "Shine"

Slim Thug - Still Like A Boss

- "Gun Play" (feat. Killa Kyleon)

Spodee - The BID

- 10. "Top"

The Office

- "Fly Away" (Chris Brown Demo)

T-Pain

- "Drop It" (ft. Jeff Johnson)

Trey Songz

- "Changes"
- "Real Freak"

Vic Damone

- "Popppin' Rubberbands" (feat. Gucci Mane & Yo Gotti)
- "Check My Swag" (feat. Lil' Boosie)

Young Bleu

- "Do What I Wanna"

Young Buck

- "Lets Do It"
- "My Campaign"
- "Get Back"
- "You Better Know It"
- "Ain't Slept In Days" (featuring Ryan Toby)

Young D Da Boss

- "Like I'm Suppose To Do" (feat. Yung Ralph)

Young Dolph - Drumma Boy 2k13 Spring Bling Playlist

- "Get Blowd"

Young Woo

- "Paparazzi"

Yung Berg

- "Get It Good"
- "FishBowl"
- "One Call Away"
- "Bitch Please" (feat. Lil Wayne & Brisco)
- "You Ain't"

Yung Chase

- "Mann I'm About" ft. (Paul Wall & Slim Thug)

Yung D - At The Crib 23

- "They Don't Like That"

Yung Fresh

- "Get Doe"

Yung Joc - Swag Team Mafia

- "Wowzers"

Yung Joc - Grind Flu

- "Birds" (feat. Nicki Minaj, Gucci Mane & OJ Da Juiceman)

Yung Redd - Fast Money Underground Vol. 1

- "Get This Money"

== Credited singles ==
- 2007
  - "White Girl" (USDA)
  - "Umma Do Me" (Rocko)
  - "Shawty" (Plies featuring T-Pain)
- 2008
  - "What Up, What's Haapnin" (T.I.)
  - "Put On" (Young Jeezy featuring Kanye West)
  - "I'm Da Man" (Plies featuring Trey Songz)
  - "Tomorrow" (Rocko)
  - "Here I Am" (Rick Ross featuring Nelly & Avery Storm)
- 2009
  - "Day Dreaming" (DJ Drama featuring Akon, Snoop Dogg & T.I.)
  - "Plenty Money" (Plies)
  - "Echo" (Gorilla Zoe)
  - "Money to Blow"(Birdman featuring Drake & Lil Wayne)
- 2010
  - "Beat It Up" (Gucci Mane featuring Trey Songz)
  - "Weirdo" (Gucci Mane)
  - "Worst Enemy" (Gucci Mane)
  - "Just Like That" (Bun B featuring Young Jeezy)
  - "Lose My Mind" (Young Jeezy featuring Plies)
  - "Ms. Chocolate" (Lil Jon featuring R. Kelly & Mario and Claude Kelly)
  - "No Hands" (Waka Flocka Flame featuring Roscoe Dash & Wale)
  - "Ten Toes Down" (8Ball & MJG featuring Lil Boosie)
- 2011
  - "Goin Steady" (Rocko)
  - "Mouth Full Of Gold" (Gucci Mane featuring Birdman)
  - "24 Hours" (Gucci Mane)
  - "This Is What I Do" (Gucci Mane featuring Waka Flocka Flame & OJ Da Juiceman)
  - "Oh My" (DJ Drama featuring Fabolous, Wiz Khalifa & Roscoe Dash)
  - "Life Goes On" (8Ball & MJG featuring Slim Thug)
  - "We Can Get It On" (Yo Gotti featuring Ciara)
  - "Country Azz Nigga" (Nelly featuring T.I. & 2 Chainz)
  - "Smokin' On" (Wiz Khalifa & Snoop Dogg featuring Juicy J)
  - "Boo" (2 Chainz featuring Yo Gotti)
  - "Lose My Mind" (Jeezy featuring Plies)
- 2012
  - "Spend It" (2 Chainz)
  - "It's Nothin" (Wiz Khalifa featuring (2 Chainz)
- 2013
  - "D.I.G." (Gucci Mane)
- 2014
  - "No Love" (August Alsina featuring Nicki Minaj)
  - "Me Ok" (Jeezy)
- 2015
  - "Look at My Dab" (Migos)
- 2016
  - "Animals" (Moneybagg Yo featuring Y Gizzle & Fengshui)
  - "All My Children" (Gucci Mane)
- 2017
  - "That's How I Feel" (Young Dolph featuring Gucci Mane)
  - "While U Here" (Young Dolph)
- 2018
  - "We Poppin'" (NBA Youngboy featuring Birdman)
