= Get It =

Get It may refer to:

== Albums ==
- Get It (Dave Edmunds album) (1977)
- Get It, by X-Sinner (1989)

== Songs ==
- "Get It" (Havana Brown song) (2011)
- "Get It" (Stevie Wonder song) (1987)
- "Get It", by The Black Eyed Peas from Masters of the Sun Vol. 1 (2018)
- "Get It", by Britney Spears (2006)
- "Get It", by Bud Powell from Swingin' with Bud (1958)
- "Get It", by Busta Rhymes (2018)
- "Get It", by Darts (1979)
- "Get It", by Deepfield from Archetypes and Repetition, 2007
- "Get It", by Dukes of Windsor from Minus (2008)
- "Get It", by Kyla La Grange from Cut Your Teeth (2014)
- "Get It", by Paul McCartney from Tug of War (1982)
- "Get It", by Peaches from Impeach My Bush (2006)
- "Get It", by Styles of Beyond from Fort Minor: We Major (2005)

== See also ==
- Getting It (disambiguation)
- Got It (disambiguation)
