= You Got It (disambiguation) =

"You Got It" is a 1989 song by Roy Orbison.

You Got It may also refer to:

- You Got It (album), a 1987 album by Gang Green
- "You Got It" (Diana Ross song), 1978
- "You Got It" (Vedo song), 2020
- "You Got It", a 1997 song by Alibi
- "You Got It", a 2007 song by Lucas Grabeel
- "You Got It", a 2017 song by Bryson Tiller from the album True to Self
- "You Got It", a 2019 song by Nebula from the album Demos & Outtakes 98–02
- "You Got It (The Right Stuff)", a 1990 song by New Kids on the Block

== See also ==
- You've Got It (disambiguation)
- "U Got It", a 2000 song by Cleopatra
- "U Got It", a 1983 song by Ratt from the EP Ratt
