= Maybe (Rocko song) =

Single by Rocko

from the album Wild Life
- Released: March 3, 2010
- Recorded: 2009–2010
- Genre: Hip hop
- Length: 3:51
- Label: Rocky Road; Def Jam
- Songwriters: Rodney Hill, Jr.; Cornelius Williams
- Producer: Gutta

Rocko singles chronology
"Umma Do Me" (2007)	"Maybe" (2010)	"U.O.E.N.O." (2013)

"Maybe" is a song by American rapper Rocko. It was released on March 3, 2010 on Rocko's Rocky Road imprint through Def Jam Recordings, as the lead single from the mixtape Wild Life. In the United States, "Maybe" peaked at number 15 on Billboard's Hot R&B/Hip-Hop Songs chart, and number 52 on the Billboard Hot 100.
