= Got It =

Got It or I Got it or variants may refer to:

- Got It?, Korean-language EP by boy band Got7 2014
- "Got it", song by The Screaming Jets from All for One
- "I Got It", a song by Donnie Wahlberg featuring Aubrey O'Day
- "I Got It", song by Gorilla Zoe from Don't Feed da Animals
- "I Got It", song by Ashanti from Braveheart,
- "I Got Id", a song by the American rock band Pearl Jam featuring Neil Young
- "I've Got It", song by Ledisi from Feeling Orange but Sometimes Blue 2003
- "I've Got It", song by Jack Teagarden and David Rose

== See also ==
- She's Got It (Hebrew Ein La Elohim) 2007 Israeli comedy film with Dorit Bar-Or
- "He Got It", song by Allie Baby from Drumma Boy production discography
- "He's Got It", song by Dean Fraser
- "She Got It", song by 2 Pistols from his debut album Death Before Dishonor 2008
- "She's Got It", song by Little Richard 1956
- We Got It, an album by Immature
- We Got It (song), song from the musical Over Here! 1974
- "We've Got It", song by Cults from Static
- "You Got It", song by Roy Orbison 1989
- You've Got It (disambiguation)
