= BAYTL =

Studio album by Gucci Mane and V-Nasty
- Released: December 13, 2011
- Recorded: January – November 2011; PatchWerk Recording Studios (Atlanta, Georgia)
- Genre: Hip hop; Southern hip hop
- Length: 46:25
- Label: 1017 Brick Squad; Vice; Asylum; Warner Bros.
- Producer: Zaytoven; Tha Bizness

Gucci Mane chronology
Ferrari Boyz (2011)	BAYTL (2011)	Trap Back (2012)

BAYTL is a collaboration album between rappers Gucci Mane and V-Nasty, produced by Zaytoven and Tha Bizness. The album was released on December 13, 2011, through 1017 Brick Squad Records, Vice Records, Asylum Records and Warner Bros. Records.

The album's first official single was "Whip Appeal", which was released on November 19, 2011. On December 16, the rappers were preparing to shoot a music video for the song "Push Ups" at a recording studio in Atlanta. The song featured Slim Dunkin, who upon arrival got into an altercation with another rapper, Young Vito, which resulted in the fatal shooting of Slim Dunkin. On January 12, 2012, a video for the song "Let's Get Faded" was released and has so far been viewed over 2 million times.

== Critical reception ==
Professional ratings
Aggregate scores
Source	Rating
Metacritic	39/100
Review scores
Source	Rating
AllMusic	2.5/5 stars
The A.V. Club	C+
Boston Globe	30/100
Consequence of Sound	0.5/5 stars
Pitchfork	(4.9/10)
Spin	(1/10)
XXL	(M)

BAYTL was heavily panned by critics and listeners alike. According to Metacritic, scoring only 39/100. The album got a 2.5/5 rating from AllMusic, 2/5 from XXL, 1/10 from Spin and 0.5/5 from Consequence of Sound.

== Track listing ==
No.	Title	Producer(s)	Length
1.	"Whip Appeal" (featuring P2theLA)	Zaytoven	3:53
2.	"Loaded" (featuring Mistah F.A.B.)	Zaytoven	4:18
3.	"Let's Get Faded"	Zaytoven	4:00
4.	"White Girl"	Zaytoven	3:57
5.	"Push Ups" (featuring Slim Dunkin)	Zaytoven	4:39
6.	"Food Plug" (featuring Berner)	Zaytoven	4:22
7.	"Out My Circle"	Tha Bizness	2:56
8.	"Hate Me Some More"	Zaytoven	4:28
9.	"Millions Every Month"	Zaytoven	3:07
10.	"Fill My Shoes"	Zaytoven	4:31
11.	"Fuck You" (featuring Slim Dunkin)	Zaytoven	3:57
12.	"Slick Swag"	Zaytoven	2:17

== Charts ==
Chart (2011–12)	Peak position
US Billboard 200	198
US Top R&B/Hip-Hop Albums (Billboard)	29
US Top Rap Albums (Billboard)	16
