= Both Worlds *69 =

Studio album by Gangsta Boo
- Released: July 31, 2001
- Studios: Hypnotized Minds Studio, Memphis, Tennessee
- Genre: Hip-hop
- Length: 65:11
- Labels: Hypnotize Minds; Loud; RED
- Producers: DJ Paul; Juicy J

Gangsta Boo chronology
Enquiring Minds (1998)	Both Worlds *69 (2001)	Enquiring Minds II: The Soap Opera (2003)

Professional ratings
Review scores
Source	Rating
AllMusic	2.5/5 stars

Both Worlds *69 is the second solo studio album by American rapper Gangsta Boo. It was released in July 31, 2001, by Hypnotize Minds, Loud Records, and RED Distribution. The recording sessions took place at Hypnotized Minds Studio in Memphis. The album was produced by DJ Paul and Juicy J. It peaked at number 29 on the Billboard 200 and at number 8 on the Top R&B/Hip-Hop Albums chart in the United States.

== Track listing ==
No.	Title	Length
1.	"Intro"	1:05
2.	"Hard Not 2 Kill" (featuring DJ Paul)	5:09
3.	"They Don't Love Me"	3:16
4.	"Mask 2 My Face"	4:10
5.	"Love Don't Live (U Abandoned Me)"	4:29
6.	"Can I Get Paid (Get Your Broke Ass Out) — Da Strippers' Anthem"	4:31
7.	"M-Town Representatives" (featuring Hypnotize Camp Posse)	4:24
8.	"I Thought U Knew" (featuring Crunchy Black)	4:54
9.	"Same Block"	4:09
10.	"Don't Stand So Close '2001'" (featuring Three 6 Mafia)	4:51
11.	"Wut U Niggas Want"	5:17
12.	"Good & Hi" (featuring Juicy J)	4:02
13.	"Victim of Yo' Own Shit"	3:37
14.	"I Faked It Last Night" (featuring DJ Paul)	3:42
15.	"Chop Shop" (featuring Project Pat)	2:07
16.	"Your Girl's Man"	3:49
17.	"Outro"	1:46
Total length:		65:11

== Chart history ==
Chart (2001)	Peak position
US Billboard 200	29
US Top R&B/Hip-Hop Albums (Billboard)	8
