= U.O.E.N.O. =

Single by Rocko featuring Future and Rick Ross

from the album Gift of Gab 2
- Released: March 5, 2013
- Recorded: 2012
- Studio: 11th Street Studios (Atlanta, Georgia)
- Genre: Hip-hop
- Length: 4:20
- Label: A1
- Songwriters: Rodney Hill; William Roberts; Nayvadius Wilburn
- Producer: Childish Major

Rocko singles chronology
"Maybe" (2010)	"U.O.E.N.O." (2013)

Future singles chronology
"Karate Chop" (2013)	"U.O.E.N.O." (2013)	"Tapout" (2013)

Rick Ross singles chronology
"Believe It" (2013)	"U.O.E.N.O." (2013)	"Pour It Up (Remix)" (2013)

Music video
- "U.O.E.N.O." on YouTube

"U.O.E.N.O." (verbal shorthand for You Don't Even Know, spoken in regional vernacular dialect) is a song written and performed by American rapper Rocko featuring fellow American rappers Future and Rick Ross. It was released independently on March 5, 2013, as the lead single from the former's sixth mixtape, Gift of Gab 2 (2013). Produced by Childish Major, "U.O.E.N.O." peaked at number 20 on the US Billboard Hot 100, and landed at number 87 on the year-end Billboard Hot 100.

== Background ==
The song was originally released on February 15, 2013, as track 3 on Rocko's mixtape Gift of Gab 2.

== Remixes ==
On April 11, 2013, the first remix of the song was released featuring Wiz Khalifa. On April 18, 2013, the second remix of the song was released featuring ASAP Rocky. On April 25, 2013, the third remix was released featuring 2 Chainz. On May 23, 2013, in anticipation of their tour together, Black Hippy released a remix of "U.O.E.N.O.". On September 1, 2013, Lil Wayne released another remix as a track on his mixtape Dedication 5.

== Rick Ross controversy ==
In a line in the song, Rick Ross raps, "Put molly all in her champagne/ She ain't even know it/ I took her home and I enjoyed that/ She ain't even know it." A petition containing 72,000 signatures was presented to Reebok, demanding they drop Ross as a spokesman for the lyrics which appeared to condone date rape. Ross apologized for the lyrics, claiming they were not about rape. Reebok dropped him on April 11, 2013. A Ross concert organized by the student association of Carleton University was cancelled. Rocko later dropped the Rick Ross verse to have radio play.

In December 2023, 50 Cent posted a screenshot of Ross' controversial lyrics, associating them with Puff Daddy's sexual misconduct accusations.

== Chart performance ==
=== Weekly charts ===
Chart (2013)	Peak position
US Billboard Hot 100	20
US Hot R&B/Hip-Hop Songs (Billboard)	5
US Hot Rap Songs (Billboard)	4

=== Year-end charts ===
Chart (2013)	Position
US Billboard Hot 100	87
US Hot R&B/Hip-Hop Songs (Billboard)	21
US Rap Songs (Billboard)	15

== Certifications ==
Region	Certification	Certified units/sales
United States (RIAA)	Gold	500,000^{‡}
^{‡} Sales+streaming figures based on certification alone.

== Release history ==
Country	Date	Format	Label	Ref.
United States	March 5, 2013	Digital download	A1, Rocky Road Records	
