= Witch (Gangsta Boo and La Chat EP) =

EP by Gangsta Boo and La Chat
- Released: May 27, 2014
- Recorded: 2013–14
- Studio: Select-O-Hits Studio (Memphis, Tennessee)
- Genre: Trap; gangsta rap; horrorcore
- Length: 38:39
- Label: Phixieous Entertainment
- Producer: Wes Phillips (exec.); Gangsta Boo (exec.); La Chat (exec.); Drumma Boy; DJ Squeeky; Gezin Beats; iBeatz; Lil Jay; Thomas "Stoner" Toner; WLPWR

Gangsta Boo chronology
Enquiring Minds II: The Soap Opera (2003)	Witch (2014)

La Chat chronology
Da Hood Homegirl (2008)	Witch (2014)	Murder She Spoke II (2015)

Professional ratings
Review scores
Source	Rating
RapReviews	5/10

Witch is the collaborative extended play by American rappers Gangsta Boo and La Chat. It was released on May 27, 2014, via Phixieous Entertainment. Recording sessions took place at Select-O-Hits Studio in Memphis. The album features guest appearances from Fefe Dobson, Lil Wyte and Jelly Roll.

== Track listing ==
No.	Title	Producer(s)	Length
1.	"Witch Brew" (featuring Fefe Dobson)	WLPWR	4:37
2.	"Buss It"	DJ Squeeky	3:06
3.	"Till the Day"	Drumma Boy	2:27
4.	"On That" (featuring Lil Wyte)	Drumma Boy	4:00
5.	"Freaky Girls II" (featuring Jelly Roll)	Thomas "Stoner" Toner	3:31
6.	"Sum 2 Do"	Gezin Beats	3:06
7.	"Frenemies"	DJ Squeeky	2:52
8.	"Like a Bish"	The Colleagues	3:22
9.	"Sweet Robbery"	Drumma Boy	3:12
10.	"Can't Sit with Us"	Lil Jay	2:52
11.	"Thelma & Louise"	iBeatz	5:34
Total length:			38:39
