= Trap Back =

Mixtape by Gucci Mane
- Released: February 5, 2012
- Recorded: December 2011
- Studios: PatchWerk Recording Studios, Atlanta
- Genres: Trap music; gangsta rap; Southern hip-hop
- Length: 64:05
- Labels: 1017 Brick Squad; Warner Bros.
- Producers: Mike Will Made It; Drumma Boy; Zaytoven; Lex Luger; Southside; Sonny Digital; Polow da Don; Fatboi; K.E. on the Track

Gucci Mane chronology
BAYTL (2011)	Trap Back (2012)	I'm Up (2012)

Trap Back is a mixtape by American rapper Gucci Mane. The mixtape was released online on February 5, 2012, coinciding with Super Bowl Sunday, at 10:17 a.m.—a reference to Gucci Mane's label, 1017 Bricksquad. It was Gucci Mane's first major recording project following his release from jail at the end of 2011, after spending a total of six months incarcerated that year. Trap Back was conceived as a "comeback mixtape" to revive the rapper's reputation and career, which had stalled for years due to ongoing legal troubles and other personal setbacks.

Hosted by DJ Holiday, Trap Back features 19 tracks of trap music by nine producers: Mike Will Made It, Zaytoven, Southside, Sonny Digital, Lex Luger, Polow da Don, Fatboi, and K.E. on the Track. Lyrically, Gucci Mane raps on the mixtape about topics familiar to his past work, such as drugs, sex, and life in the trap. There are guest appearances from Future, 2 Chainz, Waka Flocka Flame, Jadakiss, Yo Gotti, Rocko, and Chilly Chill. According to reviewers, the mixtape's musical moods and lyrical tones fluctuate from the menacing and sinister to the playful and humorous.

The recording sessions marked Gucci Mane's first sustained collaboration with Mike Will Made It, who was at the time an up-and-coming producer in the Atlanta hip-hop scene. While the two had previously worked together on individual tracks, Gucci Mane's lead producer had usually been Zaytoven; Mike Will had never before been as deeply involved with the rapper's musical direction or recording process until these sessions. In addition to producing five songs, Mike Will stayed in-studio for the duration of the sessions to provide the rapper with both encouragement and, at times, blunt critiques. Though Gucci Mane was unaccustomed to recording with a producer who had such a demanding, unvarnished approach, he came to appreciate the creative results of their collaboration.

Trap Back, and especially the song "Plain Jane", were popular successes for Gucci Mane. On the mixtape website DatPiff, Trap Back has been designated "2× Platinum" with over 500,000 downloads. Critics generally praised the mixtape for Gucci Mane's clever lyricism and its innovative production, particularly Mike Will Made It's contributions. Most reviews cited the mixtape as a marked improvement compared to Gucci Mane's recent preceding material. In retrospect, critics and Gucci Mane himself have described the mixtape as the launch of a mid-career resurgence in both the quality of his music and his popularity.

== Background ==
=== 2009–2011: major-label releases and personal troubles ===
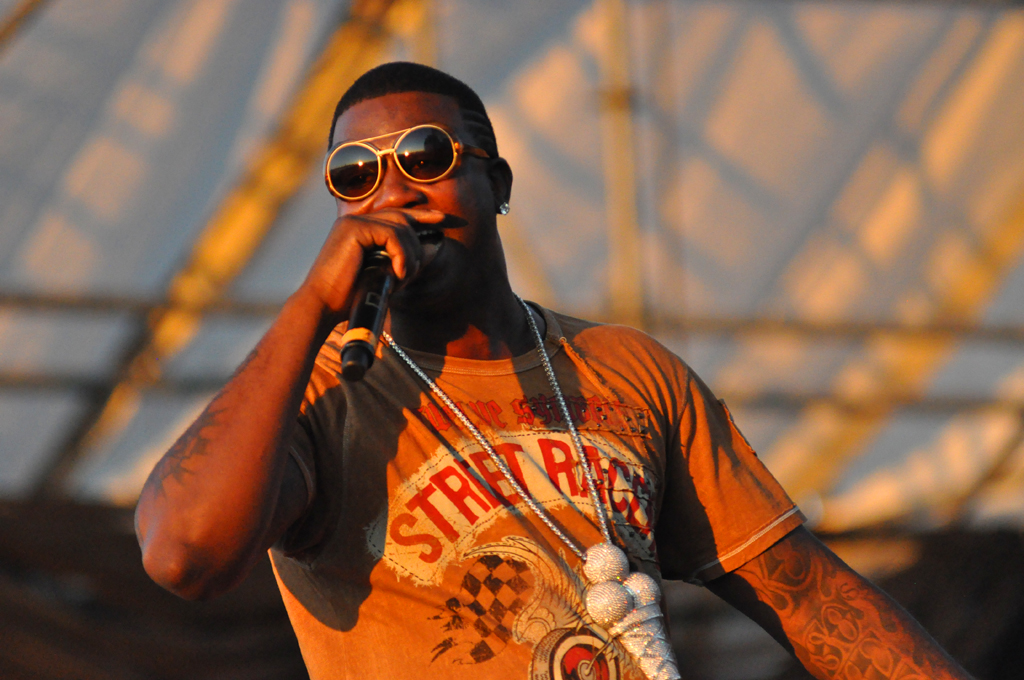
Gucci Mane performing in 2010. Around this time, the rapper seemed poised for a commercial breakthrough, but was plagued by legal issues and problems with drug use.

By 2009, Radric Davis—better known by his stage name, Gucci Mane—had established himself as a major figure in underground hip-hop. At that moment in the rapper's career, industry insiders and observers generally believed he was poised for a major commercial breakthrough. As several critics wrote in hindsight following the 2012 release of Trap Back, Gucci Mane had seemed likely to cross-over from a hardcore hip-hop audience into mainstream pop success. According to Andrew Nosnitsky, Gucci Mane had "the type of feverish, mixtape-driven buzz that had previously predicted mainstream takeovers from 50 Cent and Lil Wayne."

Gucci Mane achieved a modicum of success with The State vs. Radric Davis (2009), his first record for major label Asylum Records after a series of releases on independent record labels. But the follow-up The Appeal: Georgia's Most Wanted (2010) underperformed sales expectations. His next album, The Return of Mr. Zone 6 (2011), was delivered on a much lower recording budget and minimal promotion but sold about as well as The Appeal.

Gucci Mane had numerous legal issues in these years, as well as problems with his drug use and mental health. In his memoir, he said his "usual routine" in this time period was a repeated pattern of rebounding "straight from jail to the studio." He was drinking lean and other recreational drugs, often in prolonged binges, during which he was prone to extreme seclusion and self-imposed social isolation. His drug use occasionally manifested, in his own words, "bizarre behavior" that included "violent outbursts" but also "[s]pells where [he] would zone out and gaze into space." He was briefly committed to Anchor Hospital, a psychiatric facility in Atlanta; this incident, along with a new face tattoo of an ice cream cone that he got days after leaving the hospital, prompted the press to portray Gucci Mane as an erratic and "crazy" personality.

=== 2011: incarceration, recording, and release from jail ===
Gucci Mane served his third major stint in jail in 2011. On April 8, 2011, Gucci Mane was arrested during a visit with his probation officer on charges of misdemeanor battery and violation of probation. According to a report from the DeKalb County Police Department, the charges stemmed from a January 2011 incident when a woman recognized Gucci Mane and got into his car. Once she was in the car, the police report states, Gucci Mane offered her $150 to go to a hotel room with him. After she refused, he shoved her repeatedly until he was able to push her out of his moving car. The woman had already threatened to take legal action—and eventually reached a settlement of $58,000—but did not file a complaint with police until April. Gucci Mane disputed aspects of the police report in his 2017 biography. (Note: In Gucci Mane's account of events, he did ask the woman if she wanted to accompany him to a hotel room, but he did not describe offering her any money. He said: "She declined. Fine by me. It wasn't going to be hard to find another girl to lay up with." At this point, Gucci Mane said, the woman asked him to drive her to her job in Buckhead. He instead offered to drop her off back at the mall or at a nearby bus stop. Then, "[t]his girl started cussing and screaming at me to drive her to her job. I'd had enough. I reached across the passenger seat and opened the door. [I told her] 'You need to get out of my car.' The arguing continued until I put that bitch out of my car, but let me be clear on this. I don't think I put this girl in no danger." He also disputes that the car was in motion when the woman exited the car.)

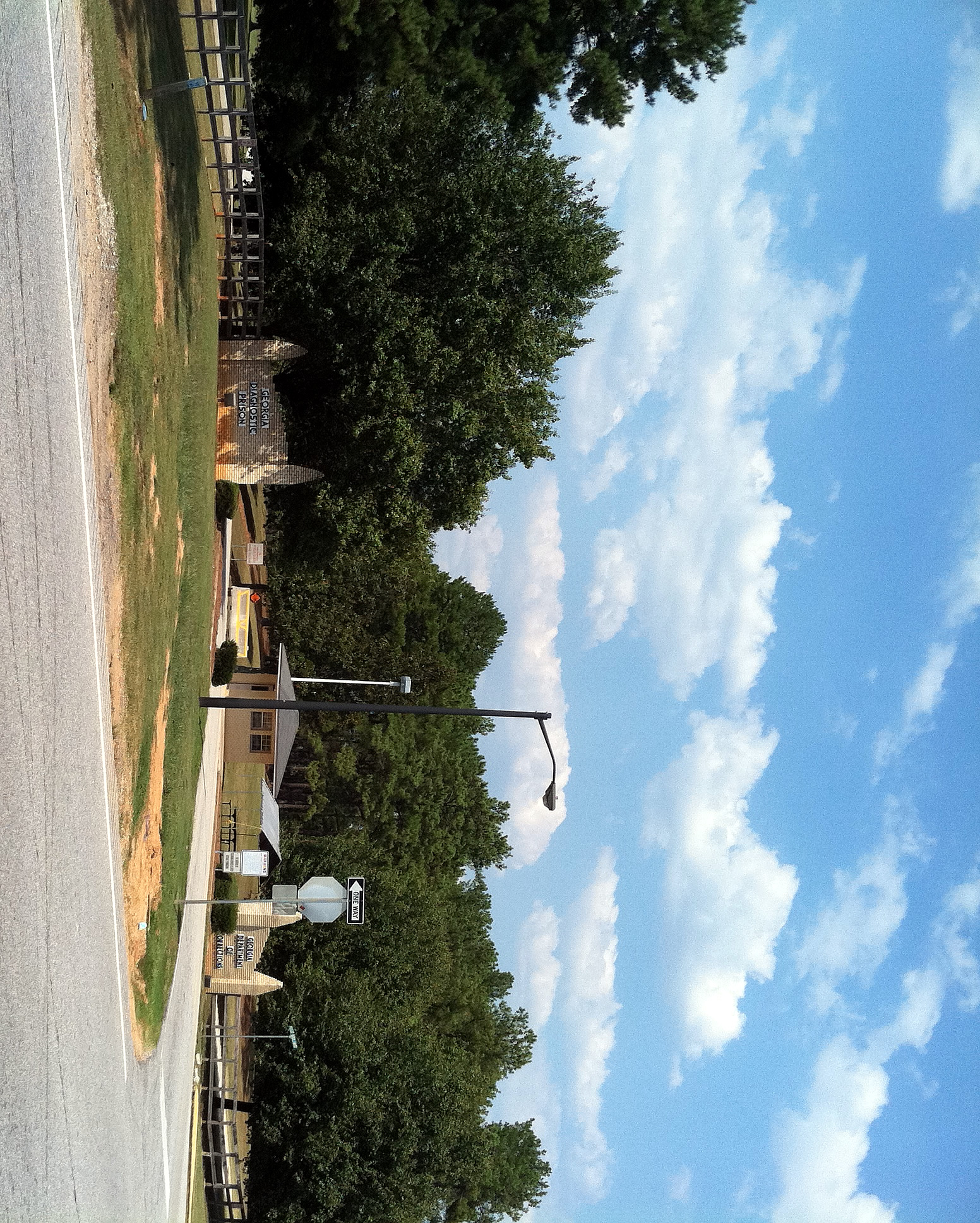
Gucci Mane was locked up for three weeks in solitary confinement at Georgia Diagnostic and Classification State Prison (facility entrance pictured).

Following the arrest, Gucci Mane spent three months in jail. He posted a $5000 bail but was held in Fulton County Jail for violating probation. He was sent to Georgia Diagnostic and Classification State Prison (GDCP) where, during his processing as an incoming inmate, his head was shaved to conform to prison rules. He spent three weeks in solitary confinement, which he later described as "three of the worst weeks I ever spent locked up." He was transferred back to Fulton County Jail and spent the remainder of his jail time there.

Gucci Mane recorded and released several projects between his release from jail in July and his return to jail in September. Although the three months at GDCP had been one of his shortest stints behind bars, there were significant developments in the Atlanta hip-hop scene during his brief absence—notably, the rise to prominence of the producer Mike Will Made It and the rappers 2 Chainz and Future. Gucci Mane was already a longtime associate of Mike Will: the two had collaborated on several songs since first meeting in 2006, when Mike Will was a junior in high school, and Gucci Mane himself had even coined the phrase "Mike Will Made It" on the track "Star Status". With Mike Will's encouragement, Gucci Mane collaborated with Future on a song called "Nasty", followed by a track with both Future and 2 Chainz called "Lost It", and finally an entire collaborative mixtape with Future called Free Bricks, which was released less than a month after Gucci Mane's release. Gucci Mane also recorded a collaborative album with Waka Flocka Flame, Ferrari Boyz, and a collaborative mixtape with Oakland-based rapper V-Nasty, BAYTL.

In September, Gucci Mane pleaded guilty to two counts of battery, two counts of reckless conduct, and one count of disorderly conduct. He was sentenced to six months in jail and ordered to attend anger management classes. He later said "[e]ven though I felt I'd done nothing wrong, my lawyer advised me against trying to fight it. After the year I'd just had I knew he was right. I was the boy who cried wolf by that point. Telling my side of the story would have just pissed off the judge." After three months in DeKalb County Jail, he was released in December for good behavior. Upon his release, Gucci Mane told XXL "[t]his is the last time I think I'll ever be in jail" and said the first thing he did after his release was change his clothes and head into the studio.

== Recording ==
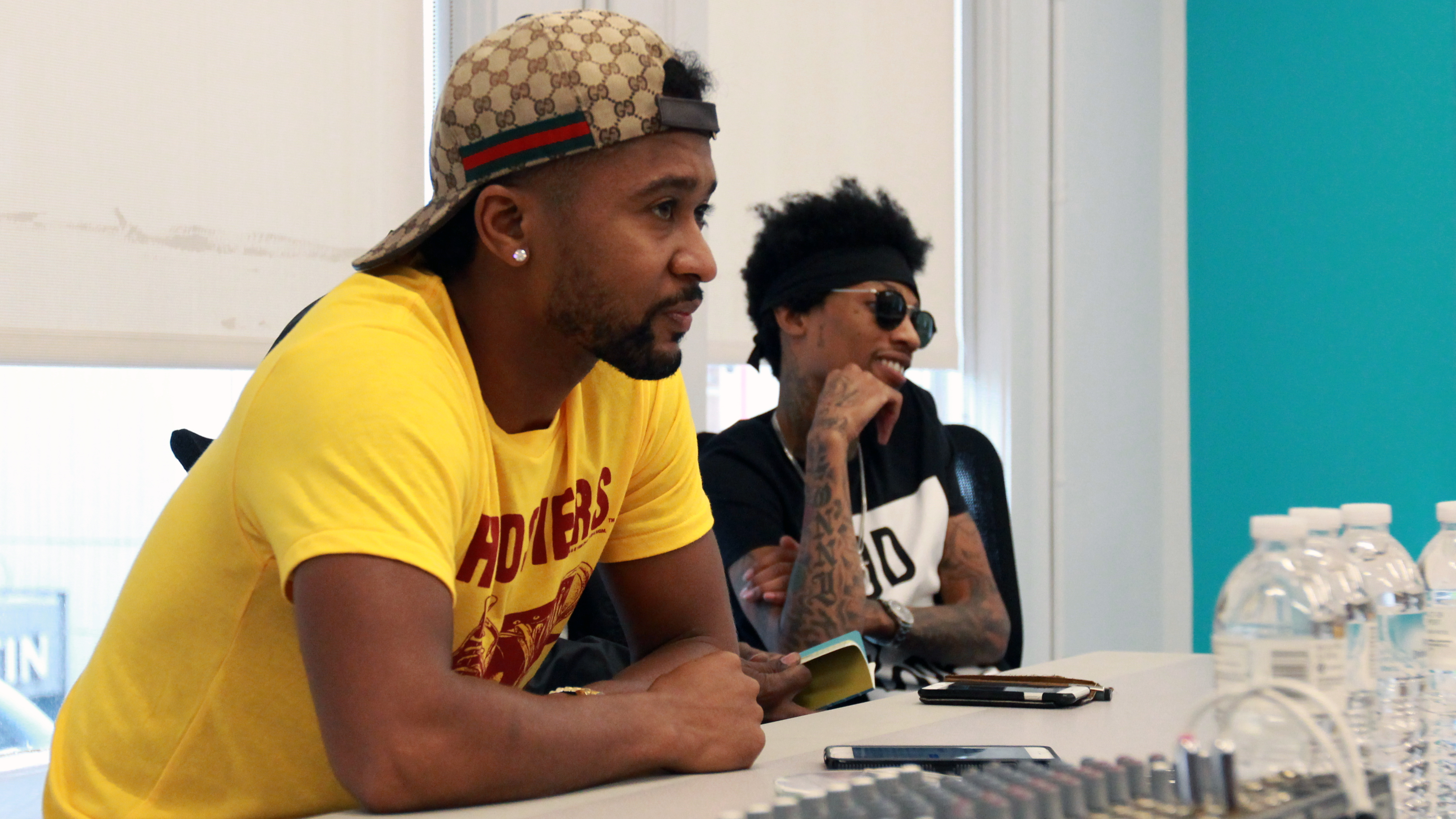
Zaytoven and Sonny Digital (pictured in 2015) contributed beats to Trap Back.

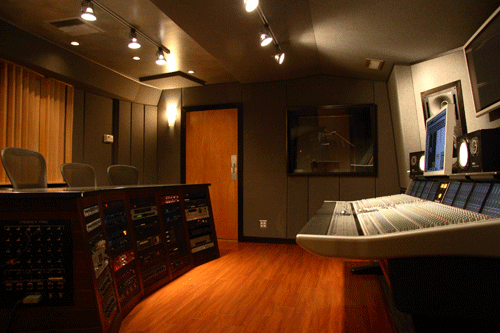
Trap Back was recorded at PatchWerk Recording Studios in Atlanta.

Upon his release from jail, Gucci Mane felt determined to revitalize his career with a "comeback mixtape". DJ Holiday, the host of Trap Back, (Note: A mixtape "host" is a DJ who helps to promote the mixtape and usually features on the recording. Before widespread distribution of hip-hop mixtapes via downloads and streams, mixtapes were typically distributed in physical form as CD-Rs. Mixtape hosts functioned like "quasi-labels", and mixtapes hosted by well-known DJs were more likely to stay stocked by retailers.) said Gucci Mane contacted him out of the blue early in the morning to ask him to work on a new mixtape:

He felt like he hadn't done a really, really hardcore trap mixtape in a while. He's like, "Yo, my nigga, we got to get the trap back." I was like, "We lost the trap?" [He said] "Nah, nah, nah, not like that. We always got the trap. But let's just do this tape for the trap. We want our trap back."

Trap Back was recorded in Atlanta's PatchWerk Recording Studios. In addition to Mike Will, Trap Back features beats from Zaytoven, Southside, Sonny Digital, Lex Luger, Polow da Don, Drumma Boy, Fatboi, and K.E. on the Track.

=== Role of Mike Will Made It ===
"Plain Jane" (feat. Rocko) – sample from the intro and first verse
The most popular song from the mixtape, "Plain Jane" received critical praise for its production by Mike Will Made It. Mike Will himself cited his work on the song as an example of true production, with a sense of how a song will take shape as a whole, as opposed to mere beat making.

Zaytoven had long been Gucci Mane's most closely associated collaborator, but Mike Will was the central producer on Trap Back. With production credits on five songs—"Walking Lick", "Plain Jane", "Get It Back", "Okay With Me", and "North Pole"—Mike Will contributed the most beats to the project. But beyond his individual credits, he took a more hands-on approach to recording than other producers Gucci Mane had worked with. Mike Will remained in-studio throughout the entire recording sessions for Trap Back, even when Gucci Mane was working on other producers' beats.

Mike Will helped to keep Gucci Mane's morale high, even in the face of personal tragedy. Less than a week after Gucci Mane's release from jail, his close friend and 1017 Records labelmate Slim Dunkin was shot and killed. Because Slim Dunkin had been on his way to meet Gucci Mane when he was killed, Gucci blamed himself for the incident and almost fell into a "downward spiral" of despair and hopelessness. However, he stayed motivated and focused on music with Mike Will's encouragement, who he said "wanted to see me come back and win just as bad as I wanted it."

Gucci Mane said Mike Will was a "perfectionist" who expressed his opinions directly when he thought Gucci could do better in his lyrics or vocals. Gucci Mane had written raps in prison, but Mike Will deemed them not good enough, prompting Gucci to start over with freestyling. Gucci Mane was unaccustomed to recording more than one take on a track, but Mike Will made Gucci rerecord vocals until he felt the performance was strong enough.

For example, Mike Will said he liked the way Gucci Mane freestyled over "Plain Jane" in rehearsal, but was surprised when Gucci Mane completely changed his flow during recording. Mike Will asked Gucci Mane to redo the vocals the same way he had practiced—which Gucci Mane did, but only on the last verse. Mike Will then rearranged the order of Gucci Mane's vocals on the track, putting the last verse first. Mike Will said these critiques and edits mark the "difference between being a beat maker and a producer", because producers are able "to put the whole record together and make sure it comes out right." Gucci Mane said he appreciated Mike Will's critiques, and both have said they had a high level of mutual creative trust during the mixtape's recording sessions.

== Contents ==
=== Intro from "Big Meech" ===
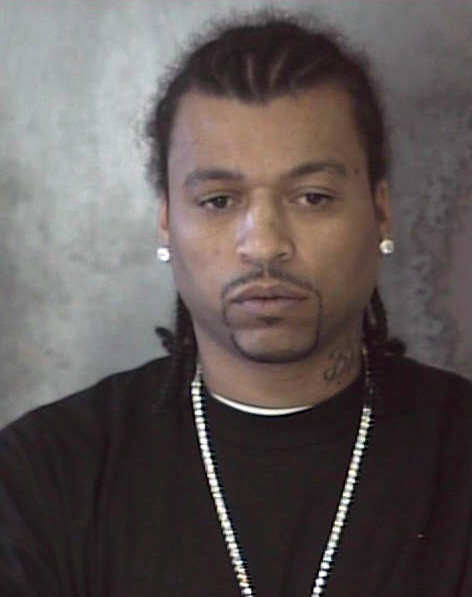
Trap Back opens with a phone call from Demetrius "Big Meech" Flenory, who was imprisoned at the time of recording.

Trap Back opens with a phone call recorded from prison: a message to Gucci Mane from the Black Mafia Family boss Demetrius "Big Meech" Flenory, known for his affiliation with rapper Jeezy. Since 2008, Meech has been serving a 30-year sentence without the possibility of parole for organized trafficking of cocaine. Meech's appearance on Trap Back was considered surprising, given that Gucci Mane had famously beefed with Jeezy. In an interview with Atlanta hip-hop station Hot 107.9, Gucci Mane said that despite his disputes with Jeezy there had never been any conflict between himself and Meech.

=== Music ===
Trap Back is one of numerous Gucci Mane releases with the word "trap" in the title, a slang term for a house used to sell drugs. As its title suggests, Trap Back is a mixtape of trap music, a style of Southern hip-hop that Gucci Mane had been associated with since its inception. Like earlier trap music, the production on Trap Back is propelled by electronic 808 percussion. But according to Anthony Walker of Dummy, the mixtape also marked a sonic transition from trap music of the preceding two years—when Lex Luger's style dominated the genre—with new prominence given to sub-bass percussion and synthesizers:

The trap aesthetic has always abounded in the gothic but is currently delving further in the dark with haunting synths accompanying the raw percussive base. ... The bluster and pomp of the Lex Luger-inspired 2010/2011 explosion has been transplanted by an insidious stalk and the subtle change can be explained as a shift in emphasis from the snare to the bass drum. This retracted boom means Gucci can really step into tracks rather than just get carried along by them.

"Plain Jane", a track that uses a low-pass filter to make the beat sound submerged underwater, serves as an example of the mixtape's production aesthetic and Mike Will's typical style. "Get It Back" uses a sample of "Tetris - Type A" by Hirokazu Tanaka, the chiptune theme song to the 1989 version of Tetris for the Game Boy. Comparing "Get It Back" to Gucci Mane's 2009 single "Lemonade", Julianne Escobedo Shepherd noted the slowed-down version of the Tetris melody sounded like "cheeky flossing, the ATL version of screaming, 'in your face.'"

Gucci Mane said "Blessing" was his favorite track on the mixtape.

=== Lyrics ===
Gucci Mane characterized the mixtape as "a journey through East Atlanta". His lyrical concerns on Trap Back include topics common to his work in general, such as drug use, drug sales, women, and money. While critics noted the topics of Gucci Mane's raps were often familiar, they praised his creative lyricism, inventive word play, and innovative flow. "Back in 95", the first full-length song, finds Gucci Mane reflecting on a lifetime as a "hustler". Calling the song "a rare look into Gucci's past," AllHipHop's Mos Jones observed "[a]lthough critics complain of the lack of variety in his subject matter, it is clear that [the drug trade] is all Gucci has known his entire life."

Gucci Mane raps about his work ethic and success on the braggadocious track "Quiet", saying "my money talks for me 'cause I be bein' quiet". On "Walking Lick", Gucci Mane portrays himself as a walking drug deal. The song "In Love with a White Girl", nominally about an interracial relationship, is also about Gucci Mane's affinity for "white girl" as in the slang term for cocaine. In "Sometimes", Gucci Mane delivers an introspective verse reflecting on the recent death of his friend Slim Dunkin. On "North Pole", Gucci Mane declares himself "Santa Claus of the city" of Atlanta—a motif that recurred on his later releases East Atlanta Santa (2014) and The Return of East Atlanta Santa (2016).

Guest appearances on Trap Back include Waka Flocka Flame on "Walking Lick"; Rocko on "Plain Jane" and "Chicken Room"; 2 Chainz on "Get It Back" and "Okay With Me"; Future on "Brick Fair" and "Sometimes"; Chilly Chill on "Ghetto"; Yo Gotti on "Blessing" and "In Love With a White Girl"; and Jadakiss on "Blessing".

Featured artists (Rocko not pictured)

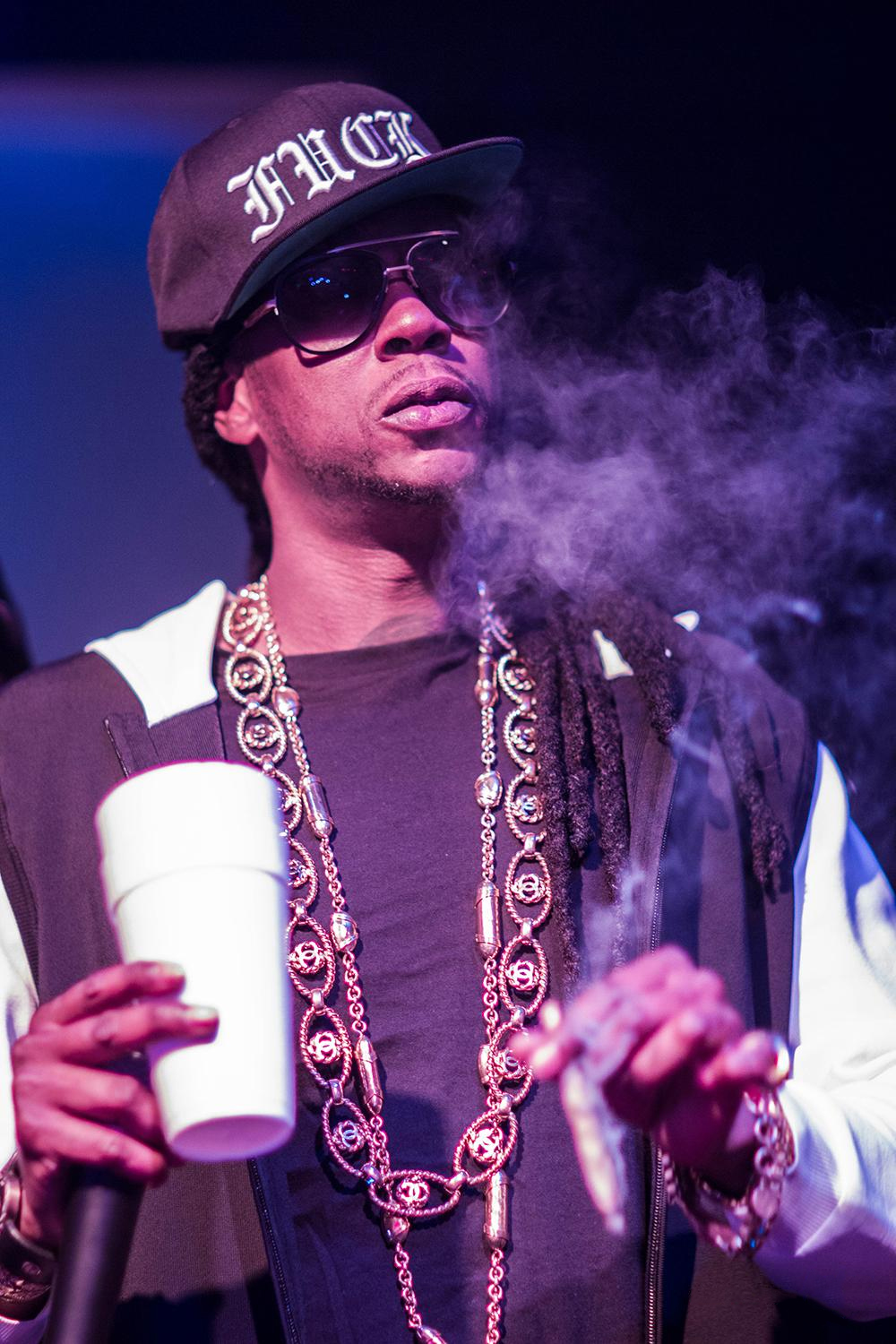
2 Chainz

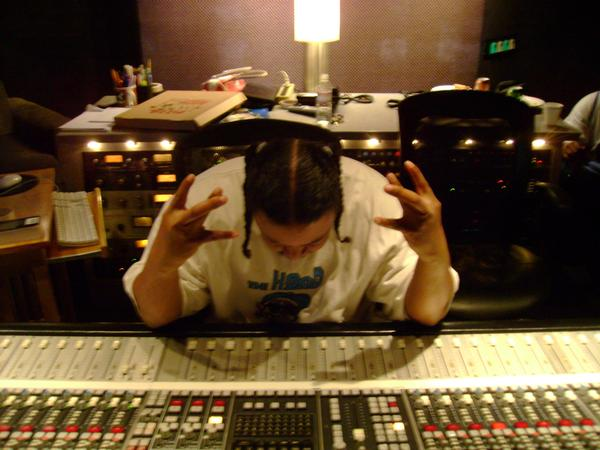
Chilly Chill

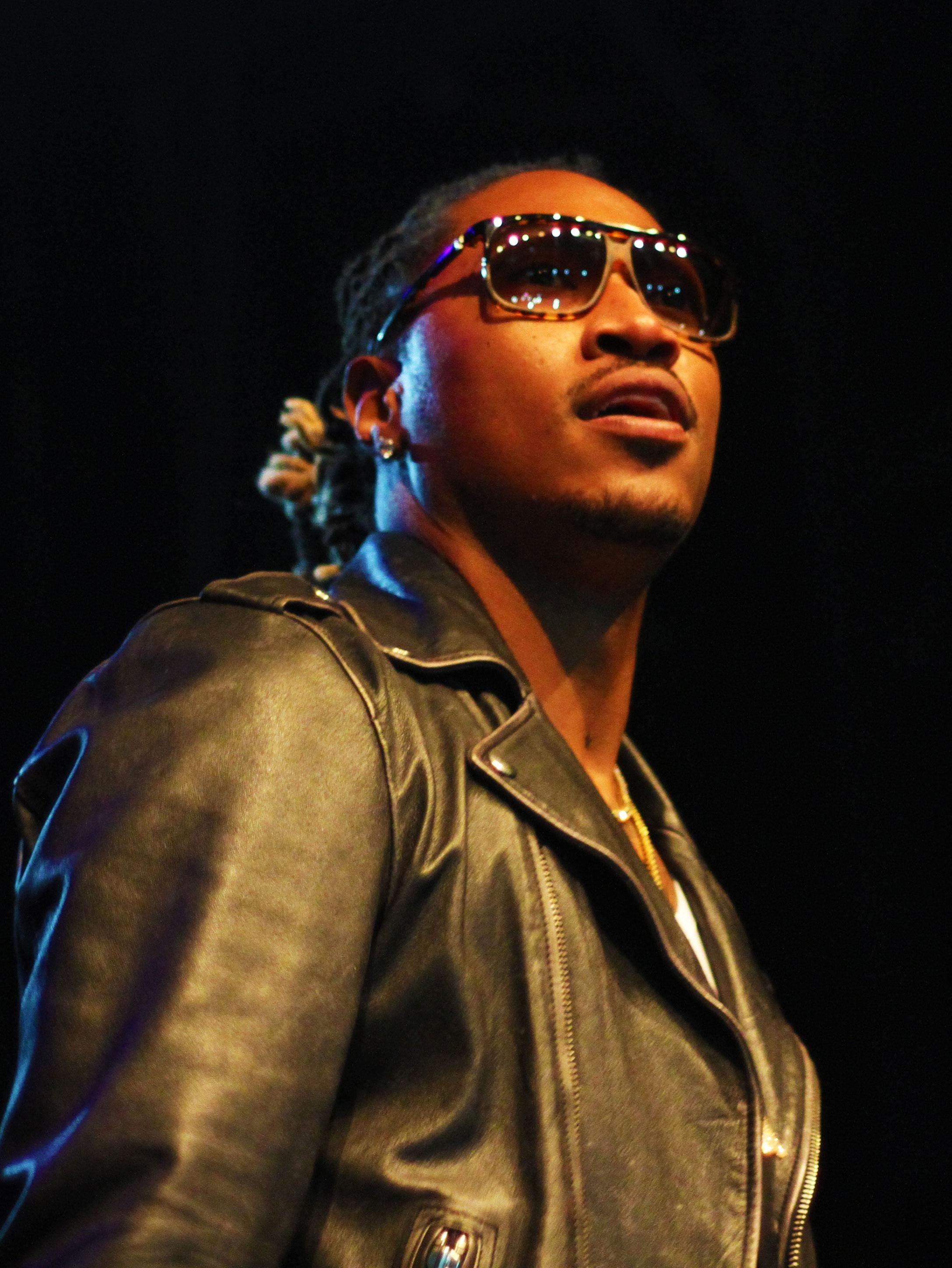
Future

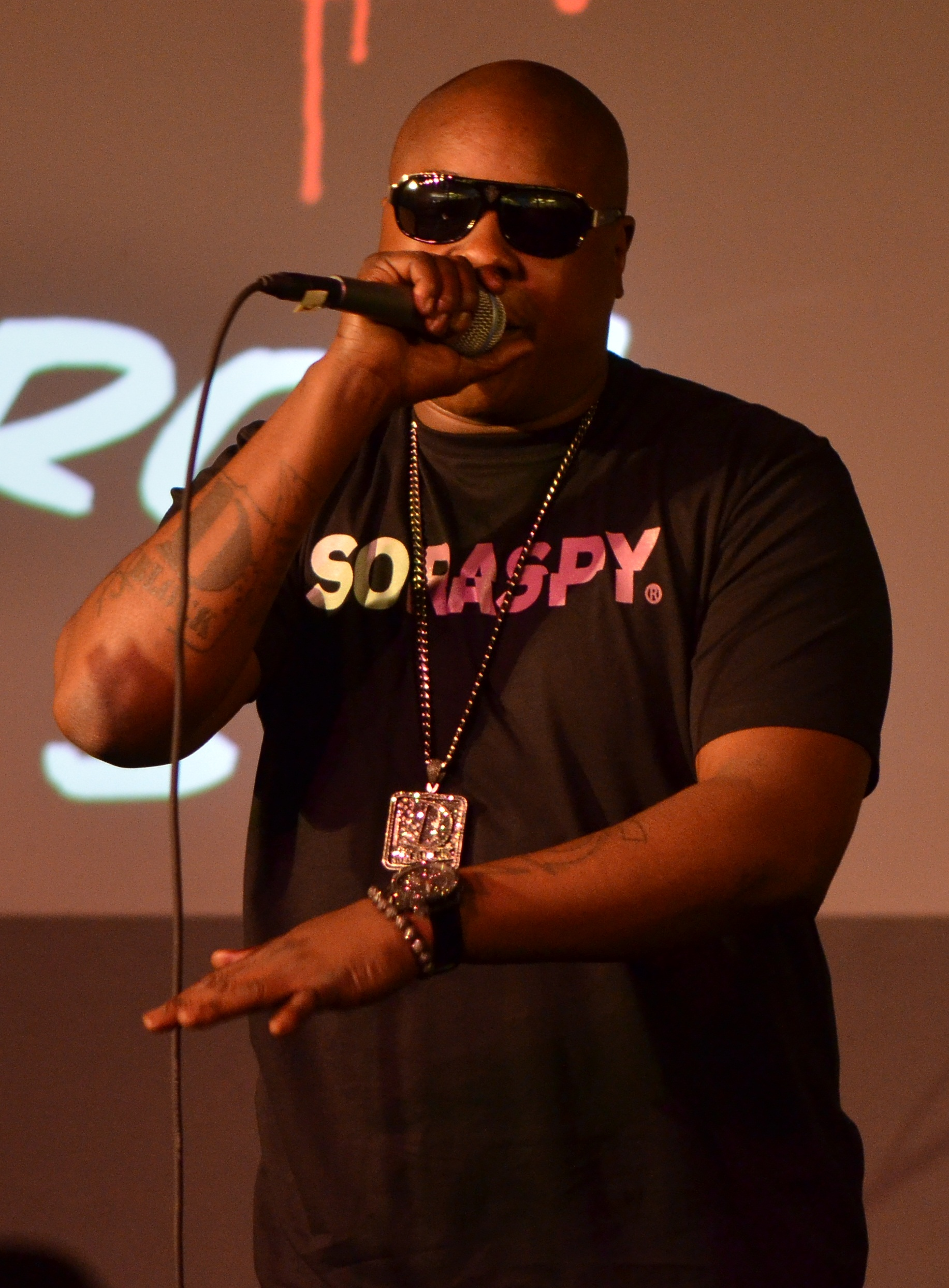
Jadakiss

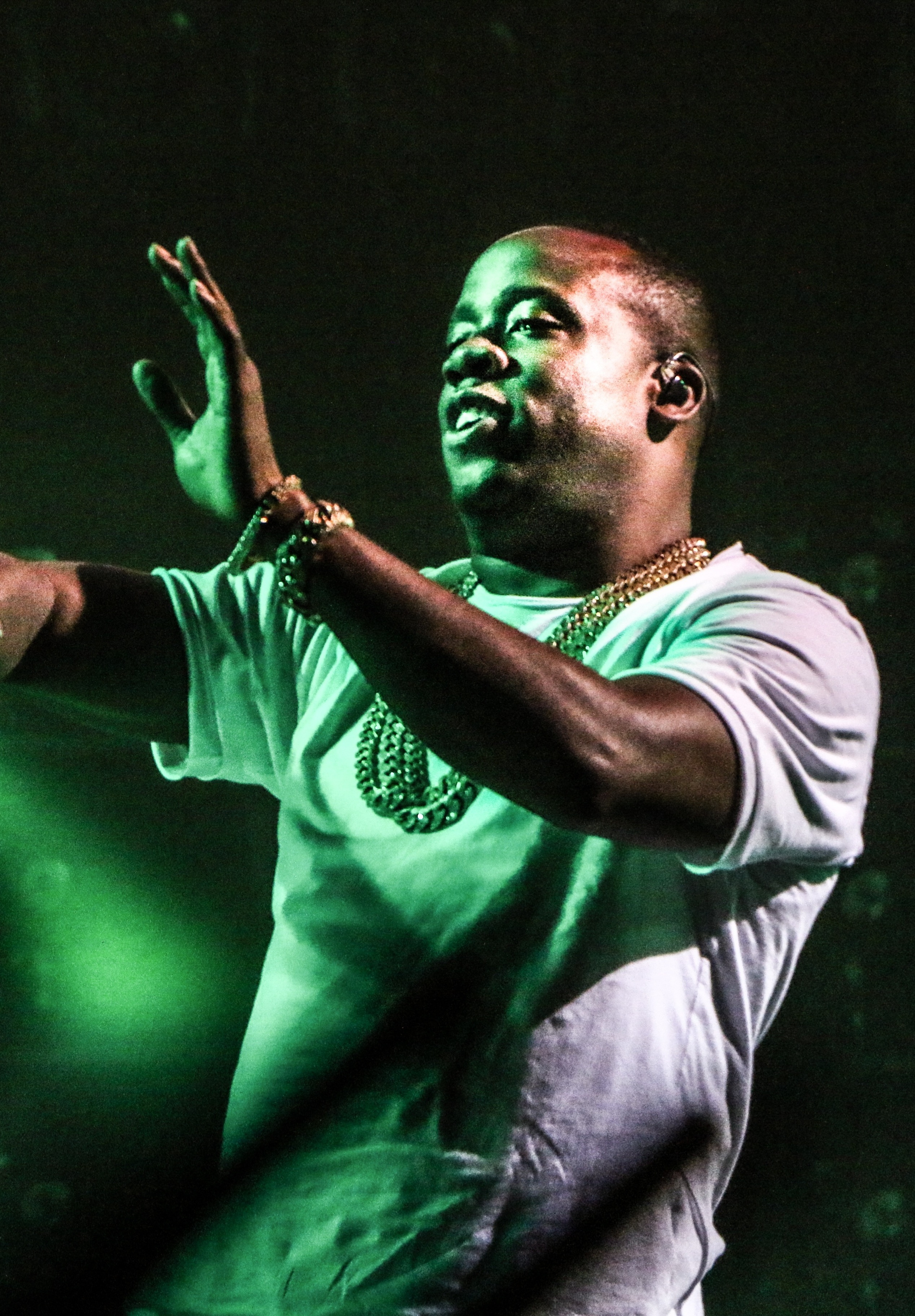
Yo Gotti

== Release ==
Trap Back was released on February 5, 2012, at 10:17 a.m., a reference to Gucci Mane's label 1017 Records. The release coincided with that year's Super Bowl Sunday and took place a few hours before the kickoff of Super Bowl XLVI. According to a Gucci Mane discography compiled by XXL, Trap Back was the rapper's thirtieth mixtape. Later the same day, Gucci Mane released another mixtape, Gucci Classics 2, a title he had announced shortly after his release from jail and slated for a December or January release. Gucci Mane held a Trap Back release party at the Velvet Room in Atlanta the same day as its release.

According to Wilson McBee at Prefix, Trap Back was "[e]asily the most anticipated mixtape of the current cycle". Trap Back reached "2× Platinum" status on the mixtape website DatPiff with more than 500,000 downloads. No official singles were released from Trap Back, but Gucci Mane released music videos for the songs "Okay With Me", "North Pole", "Face Card", "Quiet", "Chicken Room", and "In Love With a White Girl".

The most successful song from Trap Back was "Plain Jane", which Gucci Mane described as an "immediate fan favorite". Even though it was never released as an official single or promoted to radio stations, Gucci Mane said the song "killed the streets" and "was fucking people up", and he continues to perform the song at virtually every concert. A remix of "Plain Jane" with a new verse from T.I. appeared on Gucci Mane's next mixtape, the May 25 release I'm Up, and a video for this version of the song came out in September.

== Reception ==
Professional ratings
Review scores
Source	Rating
AllHipHop	7.5/10
Fact	3.5/5 marks
Pitchfork	7.8/10
XXL	L

Trap Back received generally positive reviews from critics, which pleased Gucci Mane and made him feel that the effort he had put into the mixtape had been worthwhile. Critics generally agreed that Gucci Mane's lyrics and vocal delivery represented a significant improvement compared to his recent projects. Many reviewers had high praise for the production, with several critics highlighting Mike Will Made It's contributions.

In a preliminary review, Tom Breihan at Stereogum said on first impression Trap Back "the sharpest thing he's done in quite some time," called Gucci mane's raps "remarkably coherent", and said "the beat to 'Plain Jane' will rearrange your whole shit." When Stereogum named Trap Back as its "Mixtape of the Week", Breihan wrote that it was a "ridiculously entertaining hour of rap music", noting Davis's inventive flow and the high quality of the production. Dubbing Trap Back a "great" mixtape, Jayson Greene of Pitchfork wrote "like all his best music, it is colorful and interesting and flagrantly dumb and sneakily clever, all at once." According to Greene, the reasons for the mixtape's greatness were Gucci Mane's "insanely memorable" verses and Mike Will Made It's production, which he called "menacing and playful all at once, [meaning] it's a perfect match for Gucci's style." The only mostly negative review came from HipHopDX, whose Phillip Mlynar said "the project reinforces the limits of Gucci's trap rap spiel and leaves the suspicion that his popularity has already peaked." Although Mlynar found some of the lyrics amusing and enjoyed the upbeat lyrics and production of "Get It Back", he said most of the production "errs on the wannabe menacing side" and the mixtape as a whole "far from heralds the rejuvenation of Gucci".

Andrew Nosnitsky wrote for MTV.com that Trap Back evinced a major effort on Gucci Mane's part to avoid complacency and stagnation, comparable to Jay-Z's resurgent performance on Watch the Throne (2011). Although Nosnitsky said "Trap Back isn't quite the return to form that its title suggests," he said it was on par with the rapper's recent work and served as a strong indicator that the rapper would show continued improvement in his next releases. A few months later, writing for London-based magazine The Wire, Nosnitsky described both Trap Back and Davis's next mixtape, I'm Up, as "uniformly excellent". Robert Baker of XXL said Trap Back found Gucci Mane "back in his element" with a "disproportionate amount of lyricism" on display. Baker felt the lyrics had weak spots and rehashed well-worn topics, but wrote that "[e]ven when he's saying the same thing in only slightly new ways, Gucc does it with flair." Mos Jones of AllHipHop said the mixtape was likely Gucci Mane's best work since 2008; he called it an "exercise in excellent trap production" and said that although Gucci Mane "may not be the most lyrical rapper to ever pick up a microphone," he "put enough emotion and flair into his words" to make them "float inside of your consciousness for days." Writing for the UK-based Fact magazine, Jack Law said Trap Back "mostly succeeds because it's fun", describing the mixtape's overall sound as "an inventive, weirdly playful twist on the trap template" and Gucci Mane's lyrics as "completely conventional (he's got a lot of money, he's fucked a lot of honeyz, etc.) but so eccentrically and extravagantly depicted that they end up seeming exotic and cartoonish."

In the 2012 Rewind issue of The Wire, Trap Back was listed as one of the year's ten best hip-hop releases. Spin named Trap Back one of the 40 best hip-hop releases of the year. Three critics placed Trap Back on their ballots for The Village Voice's year-end poll, Pazz & Jop.

== Legacy and influence ==
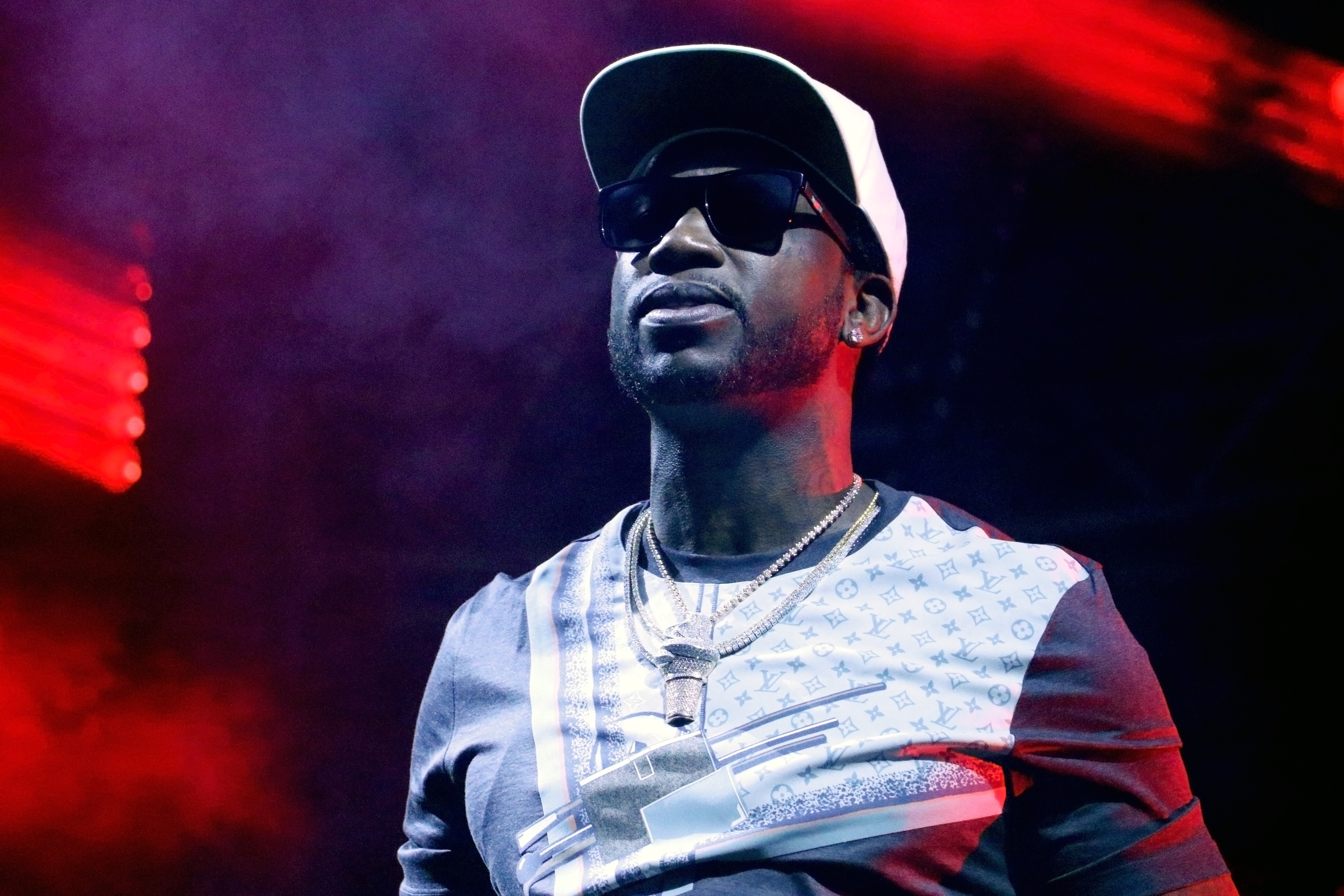
In retrospect, critics have identified Trap Back as the starting point of a mid-career resurgence for Gucci Mane (pictured onstage in 2017).

With the success of Trap Back and its followup I'm Up, and shortly after filming his part for the Harmony Korine-directed film Spring Breakers (2012), Gucci Mane felt ready to approach Warner Bros. Records executive Todd Moscowitz to request a budget for a new album. Moscowitz told Gucci Mane he was unable to provide a budget for an album, but he did give Gucci Mane permission to start selling his recent mixtapes on the iTunes Store for additional revenue and came up with the title of Gucci Mane's third and final mixtape of 2012, Trap God. After Trap Back, Gucci Mane released a total of seven more mixtapes before returning to jail in April 2013, including Trap Back 2. In his 2017 memoir, Gucci Mane said that his next album, the independently released Trap House III (2013), marked the "culmination" of the comeback he had begun with Trap Back.

Critics have concurred with Gucci Mane's assessment of Trap Back as a comeback and a highlight of his prolific recording career. A year after its release, Lawrence Burney wrote in XXL that the mixtape had represented a "return to form" for Gucci Mane and had "brought back the animated metaphors and sheer ignorance that were driven perfectly through his barely-understandable, muffled delivery." Reviewing Gucci Mane's Mr. Davis in 2017, Evan Rytlewski said the rapper was "making his most engaging music since his Trap Back/Trap God resurgence" and moving into a third "legacy-defining hot streak".

The mixtape's trap beats influenced producers in hip-hop and other genres. Chicago-based electronic musician DJ Rashad sampled the title track from Trap Back for a juke/footwork beat, which can be found on Teklife Volume 1 – Welcome to the Chi (2012). The Philadelphia-based producer Maaly Raw, known for his work with Lil Uzi Vert, cited Trap Back and Trap God as formative influences. When Complex listed the best hip-hop producers of each year between 1979 and 2017, the magazine named Mike Will Made It the best producer of 2012, citing his work on the "underrated" Trap Back and I'm Up mixtapes among his notable accomplishments that year. Mike Will Made It himself called Trap Back a "classic", ranking it among his personal favorite musical projects—a list that included projects he had personally worked on as well as historic hip-hop albums like Dr. Dre's The Chronic (1992), Jay-Z's The Blueprint (2001), and Kanye West's The College Dropout (2004).

== Track listing ==
Credits adapted from the mixtape's page on DatPiff and the back cover of the CD-R release.

No.	Title	Producer(s)	Length
1.	"Intro (Big Meech)"		0:38
2.	"Back in 95"	Sonny Digital	3:50
3.	"Quiet"	Southside	3:00
4.	"Walking Lick" (featuring Waka Flocka Flame)	Mike Will Made It	3:19
5.	"Plain Jane" (featuring Rocko)	Mike Will Made It	4:35
6.	"Get It Back" (featuring 2 Chainz)	Mike Will Made It	2:43
7.	"Trap Back"	Southside	3:22
8.	"Opposite"	Southside	3:12
9.	"Brick Fair" (featuring Future)	Zaytoven	2:55
10.	"Ghetto" (featuring Chilly Chill)	Polow da Don	3:42
11.	"Thank You"	Drumma Boy	3:25
12.	"Blessing" (featuring Yo Gotti & Jadakiss)	Lex Luger	4:10
13.	"FaceCard"	Zaytoven	3:00
14.	"In Love With a White Girl" (featuring Yo Gotti)	Zaytoven	4:14
15.	"Chicken Room" (featuring Rocko)	Fatboi	3:41
16.	"Okay With Me" (featuring 2 Chainz)	Mike Will Made It	4:21
17.	"Club Hoppin"	K.E. on the Track	4:06
18.	"Sometimes" (featuring Future)	Drumma Boy	3:11
19.	"North Pole"	Mike Will Made It	2:41
Total length:			64:05

Notes

- "Intro (Big Meech)" is titled "Big Boss Meech Speaks/Intro" on the CD-R version of the mixtape. No producer is credited for this track.
- "Get It Back" contains a sample of "Tetris - Type A" by Hirokazu Tanaka, the theme song to the 1989 version of Tetris for the Game Boy.
