= Enquiring Minds II: The Soap Opera =

Studio album by Gangsta Boo
- Released: September 23, 2003
- Recorded: 2002–2003
- Genres: Hip-hop; gangsta rap
- Length: 1:01:38
- Label: Yorktown Records
- Producers: Jacob York; Gangsta Boo; Drumma Boy; Kool Ace; Moby Dick; Swizzo; Don Vito; Karesha Jones; Mr. DJ; Nitti; Oomp Camp; The Beat Bullies; Zone 4 Inc.

Gangsta Boo chronology
Both Worlds *69 (2001)	Enquiring Minds II: The Soap Opera (2003)	Witch (2014)

Professional ratings
Review scores
Source	Rating
AllMusic	3/5 stars

Enquiring Minds II: The Soap Opera is the third and final solo studio album by American rapper Gangsta Boo to be released during her lifetime. It was released on September 23, 2003, via Yorktown Records. The album is a sequel to her 1998 solo debut, Enquiring Minds.

AllMusic noted that the album switched between two styles: clean hip-hop with reference to the stage name "Lady Boo" in an attempt by Gangsta Boo to distance herself from her former colleagues at Three 6 Mafia, and an aggressive "raw and driven" stance which is a return to familiar form.

== Track listing ==
No.	Title	Producer(s)	Length
1.	"Intro - Tha Truth"	Swizzo	1:23
2.	"Sippin & Spinnin"	Drumma Boy	3:42
3.	"How We Roll"	Nitti	3:48
4.	"Let Me Get That Off You" (featuring Lil' E)	Mo B. Dick	4:23
5.	"City Streets"	Drumma Boy	3:43
6.	"Posted @ Tha Bar" (featuring Attitude)	Zone 4 Inc.	4:29
7.	"Jail Talk" (featuring P.B. Mempfis)	Swizzo	6:11
8.	"Move" (featuring Rasheeda & Kelly)	Karesha Jones	4:22
9.	"Cutty Girl" (featuring Kandi)	Don Vito	4:24
10.	"Let's Get High"	Kool-Ace	4:20
11.	"Down Chick"	Mr. DJ	3:22
12.	"Kill or Be Killed"	Mo B. Dick	4:21
13.	"Weed & Cocaine"	Oomp Camp	3:46
14.	"Interlude"		0:48
15.	"3-Way (Infatuation, Lust & Love)" (featuring Christie Kennedy)	Kool-Ace	3:46
16.	"Where They Hang"	The Beat Bullies	4:50
Total length:			1:01:38

== Chart history ==
Chart (2003)	Peak position
US Top R&B/Hip-Hop Albums (Billboard)	53
US Independent Albums (Billboard)	24
