= Getting It =

Getting It may refer to:

- Getting It: The Psychology of est, a 1976 non-fiction book by Sheridan Fenwick
- Getting It, a 2006 novel by Alex Sánchez
- "Getting It", a song by The Wildhearts from P.H.U.Q., 1995
