= You've Got It (disambiguation) =

"You've Got It" is a 1989 song by Simply Red.

You've Got It may also refer to:

- "You've Got It", a song by Billie Piper on her 1998 album Honey to the B
- "You've Got It", a song by Bruce Springsteen on his 2012 album Wrecking Ball
- "You've Got It", a song by Greg Sczebel on his 2004 album Here to Stay

== See also ==
- "You Got It", a song by Roy Orbison
- Got It (disambiguation)
