= I'm Up (Gucci Mane mixtape) =

Mixtape by Gucci Mane
- Released: May 25, 2012
- Genre: Hip-hop
- Length: 73:37
- Label: 1017 Bricksquad
- Producer: Zaytoven; Drumma Boy; Mike WiLL Made It; Polow da Don; Bankroll Clay; Big Fruit; Lex Luger; Sonny Digital; DJ Spinz; Young Chop; BandkAMP; Shawty Redd; Fatboi; Detail; Drumma Drama

Gucci Mane chronology
Trap Back (2012)	I'm Up (2012)	Trap God (2012)

I'm Up is a mixtape by American rapper Gucci Mane. It was released on May 25, 2012, by 1017 Bricksquad. This mixtape includes guest appearances from Yo Gotti, Rocko, Future, Chris Brown, Lil Wayne, Big Sean, 8Ball, Rick Ross, Birdman, Jim Jones, Fabolous, Scarface, T.I., Jeremih, and 2 Chainz.

== Reception ==
=== Critical response ===
Professional ratings
Review scores
Source	Rating
XXL	(L)

Ralph Bristout of XXL said, "Despite the notable joints, I'm Up is flooded with featured guests, whom often outshine the rapper ("Don't Make No Sense" next to Fabolous and 8Ball; "Scarface" alongside Scarface). Though they don't necessarily hurt the project—adding a mélange of different styles and various temperaments—the supporting cast makes the tape seem more like a compilation project than a solo." Slava Kuperstein of HipHopDX said, "Whatever criticisms fans may offer of Gucci Mane, the man works the mixtape scene hard. A cursory look at Wikipedia reveals that I'm Up is Gucci's 27th mixtape; not only that, but it's the second of this year. Sure, it's easier to have such prolific output when your subject matter is so narrow you could thread a needle with it, but Gucci delivers what the people want from him: a handful of hard-hitting beats, a few quotables, and some memorable guest spots."

== Music videos ==
Music videos were released for songs such as "Super Cocky", "Kansas" featuring Jim Jones, "Wish You Would" featuring Verse Simmonds, "Brought Out Them Racks" featuring Big Sean, "Plain Jane (Remix)" featuring Rocko and T.I., and "Too Sexy" featuring Jeremih.

== Track listing ==
No.	Title	Producer(s)	Length
1.	"Without Me"	Zaytoven	3:44
2.	"I'm Up" (featuring 2 Chainz)	Drumma Boy	3:25
3.	"Trap Boomin" (featuring Rick Ross)	Mike WiLL Made It	2:49
4.	"Cyeah" (featuring Chris Brown & Lil Wayne)	Polow da Don	3:52
5.	"Kansas" (featuring Jim Jones)	Bankroll Clay	4:25
6.	"Wish You Would" (featuring Verse Simmonds)	Big Fruit	3:28
7.	"Brought Out Them Racks" (featuring Big Sean)	Drumma Boy	3:05
8.	"Spread the Word"	Lex Luger	3:17
9.	"Drink Mud"	Sonny Digital	3:34
10.	"Anytime You Ready" (featuring Birdman)	Drumma Boy	3:56
11.	"Dont Make No Sense" (featuring 8Ball & Fabolous)	DJ Spinz	3:54
12.	"Super Cocky"	Young Chop	3:39
13.	"Gymnast"	Shawty Redd	3:24
14.	"Scarface" (featuring Scarface)	Mike WiLL Made It	4:07
15.	"Gucci Freestyle" (Skit)	Mike WiLL Made It	0:42
16.	"Careless & Reckless" (featuring Future & Chill Will)	Fatboi, Zaytoven	4:17
17.	"Get Lost" (featuring Birdman)	Detail	4:32
18.	"It Ain't Funny" (featuring Yo Gotti)	Drumma Boy	3:18
19.	"Put On A Show"	Drumma Boy	2:38
20.	"Too Sexy" (featuring Jeremih)	Mike WiLL Made It	3:10
21.	"Plain Jane" (featuring Rocko & T.I.)	Mike WiLL Made It	4:30
