= Loyalty (Soulja Boy album) =

Studio album by Soulja Boy
- Released: February 3, 2015
- Genre: Hip hop
- Length: 62:29
- Label: SODMG
- Producer: 337Mayhem; B-Rackz; BeatPlugg; Bighead; Brandnew; Dranzition Music; Joseph DaVinci; MPC Cartel; Protege Beatz; Soulja Boy; Xay Scott

Soulja Boy chronology
King Soulja 3 (2014)	Loyalty (2015)	Best To Ever Do It (2018)

Singles from Loyalty
- 1. "Hurricane" Released: January 2, 2015

Loyalty is the fifth studio album by American rapper Soulja Boy. It was released on February 3, 2015, by Stacks on Deck Entertainment.

== Background ==
On November 17, 2014, DeAndre Way announced via his Instagram that he signed a new label deal to Universal Music Group. He also revealed the title, cover art and the release date to his upcoming fourth studio album, titled Loyalty. He later announced the album would be released on December 2, 2014. On February 3, 2015, Way announced that he would be releasing the album digitally on iTunes, and it would also be released independently on his label Stacks on Deck Entertainment.

== Singles ==
The album was preceded by only one single, "Hurricane". It was released on January 2, 2015. Its music video was released on January 10, 2015, directed by HiDefinition.

== Track listing ==
No.	Title	Writer(s)	Producer(s)	Length
1.	"Hurricane"	DeAndre Way; Jared Scales	MPC Cartel	3:14
2.	"We Don't Fight"	Way; Christopher Cummings	BeatPlugg	4:21
3.	"OG Gas" (featuring Rich the Kid)	Way; Dimitri Roger; Emiliano Valentin Rodriguez; Brendan Murray	Joseph DaVinci, Bighead	3:54
4.	"Designer"	Way; Scales	MPC Cartel	3:24
5.	"Don't Nothing Move but the Money"	Way; Rodriguez	Joseph DaVinci	3:33
6.	"Gold Bricks"	Way; Demetrie Glover	Protege Beatz	5:30
7.	"Panamera"	Way; Scales	MPC Cartel	4:03
8.	"Backwoods"	Way; Brandon Ross	Brandnew	4:08
9.	"Bankroll"	Way; Elijah Johnson III; Andrey Kitaev	Xay Scott, Dranzition Music	3:15
10.	"Foreign Whip"	Way; Glover	Protege Beatz	4:21
11.	"Rambo"	Way; Branden Brown; Scales	B-Rackz, MPC Cartel	5:00
12.	"Hit It"	Way; Ross	Brandnew	4:27
13.	"Still Whippin'"	Way; Scales	MPC Cartel	6:17
14.	"Trap Party"	Way	Soulja Boy	4:00
15.	"Drop Head Phantom" (featuring Wankaego)	Way; Theresa Runyon; Scales; Mytarius Thomas	MPC Cartel, 337Mayhem	3:50
Total length:				62:29
