= Self Made (album) =

Studio album by Rocko
- Released: March 18, 2008
- Recorded: 2007–2008
- Genre: Hip hop
- Label: Rocky Road; Island Urban
- Producer: Drumma Boy; Marvelous J; Cool & Dre; Fatboi; J.U.S.T.I.C.E. League; The Runners

Rocko chronology
Self Made (2008)	Wildlife (2010)

Singles from Self Made
- 1. "Umma Do Me" Released: December 11, 2007; 2. "Tomorrow" Released: February 12, 2008; 3. "Dis Morning" Released: February 19, 2008

Professional ratings
Review scores
Source	Rating
AllMusic	2.5/5 stars
DJBooth.net	1.5/5
HipHopDX	1/5
RapReviews.com	4.5/10

Self Made is the only studio album by American rapper Rocko, released on March 18, 2008. As a joint venture between Rocky Road Records and Island Urban Music, it was preceded by the moderately successful singles "Umma Do Me", "Tomorrow", and "Dis Morning". Guest artists include Lloyd, Kevin Cossom, Dre, and Monica, while production was mainly handled by Memphis-based producer Drumma Boy.

== Commercial performance ==
The album debuted at number 21 on the US Billboard 200 chart, selling 70,000 copies in its first week.

== Track listing ==
Self Made track listing
No.	Title	Writer(s)	Producer(s)	Length
1.	"Dis Morning"	Rodney Hill, Jr.; Jeffrey White	Marvelous J	3:45
2.	"Umma Do Me"	Hill; Christopher Gholson	Drumma Boy	3:52
3.	"Hustle Fo" (featuring Lloyd)	Hill; White; Lloyd Polite	Marvelous J	4:30
4.	"Busy"	Hill; Gholson	Drumma Boy	3:00
5.	"Tomorrow"	Hill; Gholson	Drumma Boy	3:51
6.	"Old Skool"	Hill; Gholson	Drumma Boy	4:10
7.	"Priceless"	Hill; LaDamon Douglas	Fatboi	4:01
8.	"Like Dis Here"	Hill; Gholson	Drumma Boy	4:08
9.	"That’s My Money" (featuring Kevin Cossom)	Hill; Andrew Harr; Jermaine Jackson; Kevin Cossom	The Runners	4:17
10.	"She Can Get It" (featuring Dre)	Hill; Marcello Valenzano; Andre Lyon	Cool & Dre	4:17
11.	"Snakes"	Hill; Gholson	Drumma Boy	4:25
12.	"Meal"	Hill; Gholson	Drumma Boy	4:26
13.	"Thugs Need Love Too" (featuring Monica)	Hill; Gholson; Monica Arnold	Drumma Boy	4:30
14.	"Karma"	Hill; Kevin Crowe; Erik Ortiz	J.U.S.T.I.C.E. League	4:42

== Charts ==
=== Weekly charts ===
Weekly chart performance for Self Made
Chart (2008)	Peak position
US Billboard 200	21
US Top R&B/Hip-Hop Albums (Billboard)	6
US Top Rap Albums (Billboard)	4

=== Year-end charts ===
Year-end chart performance for Self Made
Chart (2008)	Position
US Top R&B/Hip-Hop Albums (Billboard)	73

== Release history ==
Release history for Self Made
Country	Release date
Various	March 18, 2008
Australia	May 29, 2008

== See also ==
- 2008 in hip hop
