= Umma Do Me =

Single by Rocko

from the album Self-Made
- Released: October 23, 2007
- Recorded: 2007
- Genre: Hip hop, trap
- Length: 3:51
- Label: Rocky Road; So So Def; Island
- Songwriters: Rodney Hill, Jr.; Christopher Gholson
- Producer: Drumma Boy

Rocko singles chronology
"Umma Do Me" (2007)	"Maybe" (2010)

"Umma Do Me" is the debut single by American hip hop recording artist Rocko. It was released on October 23, 2007 on Rocko's Rocky Road imprint through So So Def Recordings and Island Records, from his debut album Self-Made. The song was produced by Drumma Boy.

In the United States, "Umma Do Me" peaked at number 15 on Billboard's Hot R&B/Hip-Hop Songs chart, and number 66 on the Billboard Hot 100.

== Music video ==
Jermaine Dupri, Shawty Lo, Future, The-Dream and Trae make cameo appearances in the video. The video peaked at number 2 on BET's 106 & Park.

== Remixes/freestyles ==
The official remix features Rick Ross, T.I. and Young Jeezy.

- "Do U Potna" – T.I., Young Jeezy and Big Kuntry King
- "Imma True G" – freestyle by Cassidy
- "I Do Me" – freestyle by Dolla
- "Umma Do Me" – freestyle by B.G.(rapper)

== Charts ==
=== Weekly charts ===
Chart (2007–08)	Peak position
US Billboard Hot 100	66
US Hot R&B/Hip-Hop Songs (Billboard)	13
US Hot Rap Songs (Billboard)	7
US Rhythmic Airplay (Billboard)	33

=== Year-end charts ===
Chart (2008)	Position
US Hot R&B/Hip-Hop Songs (Billboard)	52
