= Rocko (rapper) =

American rapper

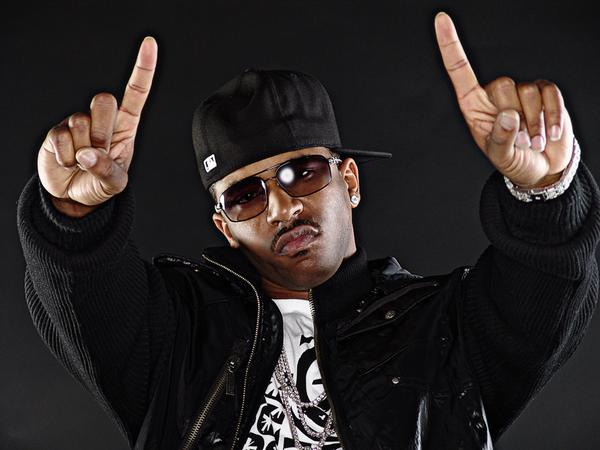
- Rocko in 2008

Background information
- Also known as: Rocko da Don
- Born: Rodney Ramone Hill Jr. December 28, 1979 (age 46); Atlanta, Georgia, U.S.
- Genres: Southern hip-hop
- Occupations: Rapper; songwriter; record executive
- Years active: 1999–present
- Labels: A1; So So Def; Def Jam; EMPIRE
- Producer(s): Drumma Boy

Rodney Ramone Hill Jr. (born December 28, 1979), known professionally as Rocko, is an American rapper and record executive from Atlanta, Georgia. He is credited with discovering fellow Atlanta-based rapper Future, who signed with Hill's record label, A1 Recordings, in 2010. Hill served as executive producer for Future's first six studio albums, until the rapper's departure from the label in 2017.

As a recording artist, Hill signed a joint venture with So So Def Recordings and Island Records to release his debut studio album, Self Made (2008). Despite negative critical reception, it moderately entered the US Billboard 200 and spawned the single "Umma Do Me", which peaked at number 66 on the US Billboard Hot 100. His 2013 single, "U.O.E.N.O." (featuring Future and Rick Ross), peaked at number 20 on the chart.

== Musical career ==
=== 1999–2008: Career beginnings and Self Made ===
In 1999, Rocko began his career as a talent agent for the independent label, Triple A Records. After a local rapper he discovered received a contract with Universal, he left Triple A and launched the record label, Rocky Road Records, in 2003. He signed or bought out recording contracts from then-upcoming musical acts including Young Dro and Dem Franchise Boyz, both of whom signed with Rocky Road prior to their mainstream breakthroughs. Also in 2003, Rocko released his debut project as a recording artist: the mixtape N.W.A (No Wack Artist). He would release several follow-up mixtapes before signing with L.A. Reid on Def Jam Recordings in October 2006. The deal was in a joint venture with fellow Atlanta native, record producer Jermaine Dupri's So So Def Recordings.

He released his debut studio album, Self Made on March 18, 2008. It featured production from Drumma Boy, Cool & Dre, The Runners and J.U.S.T.I.C.E. League, and vocal contributions from guest artists Lloyd, Dre, Kevin Cossom as well as Monica. The album was preceded by the single "Umma Do Me", his first single to reach success on the Billboard Hot 100. The album was met with generally negative reviews and lukewarm commercial reception.

=== 2010–present: Mixtape circuit ===
His second studio album One of One was originally slated for release on Def Jam Recordings, however Rocko ultimately parted ways with the label. He subsequently rebranded his Rocky Road label to be known as A1 Recordings (often typeset as A-1 Recordings). On March 1, 2010, he released the mixtape Wild Life. As a result of the positive feedback for the mixtape, Rocko re-released it as an independent album in June of that year, adding the subtitle Deez Streets a Beast. The album contained guest appearances from his A1 Recordings signee Future, who performed on the tracks "9 Times Outta Ten", "Up", and "You Know".

On February 9, 2011, Rocko released his mixtape Rocko Dinero. In September 2011, A1 Recordings would have its first major release with Future's debut single "Tony Montana", which Rocko co-wrote. On November 24, 2011, he released the mixtape Gift of Gab, the mixtape spawned the regionally successful single "Squares Out Your Circle" (featuring Future).

In April 2012, Future released his debut album Pluto, which Rocko executive produced and co-wrote five tracks on. The album was met with critical and commercial success, as did Future's subsequent releases on A1. On October 25, 2012, Rocko released the mixtape Wordplay.

On January 26, 2013, it was announced that Rocko was considering joining his old business partner L.A. Reid (who was previously an executive at Def Jam) on his new label Epic Records, as Rocko's artist Future was performing well on the label. He intimated he wasn't sure about the decision, and ultimately did not sign with Epic. Despite Rocko remaining independent, Future would continue to release his projects with Epic and remain A1's only major signee.

On February 16, 2013, he released Gift of Gab 2; the mixtape spawned his second hit with the somewhat controversial single: "U.O.E.N.O." featuring Future and Rick Ross. The song, produced by Childish Major, peaked at number 20 on the Billboard Hot 100, becoming his first top 40 hit. On February 16, 2013, it was announced that Rocko signed a distribution deal with E1 Music for his label A1, and that he was preparing for the release of his next studio album, Seeing Is Believing, effectively cancelling One of One. On March 25, 2013, Rocko hinted of a possible collaboration album between him and Future. Rocko would then release the mixtape Wordplay 2 the same year.

On February 7, 2014, Rocko released his mixtape Lingo 4 Dummys. On May 29, 2014, Rocko released an extended play (EP) entitled Poet in dedication of the passing of Maya Angelou. The EP, which features a guest appearance from Nas, was originally released for free online, but later added to the iTunes Store via A1 Recordings. On October 15, 2014, Rocko released his mixtape IGNANT. On November 27, 2014, Rocko released his mixtape FOOD.

On February 20, 2015, Rocko released his mixtape Expect the Unexpected. On July 2, 2015, he released his mixtape Real Spill. Future would part ways with Rocko's A1 Recordings label in 2017.

== Controversy ==
=== U.O.E.N.O. lyrics ===
In a line on Rocko's song "U.O.E.N.O.", fellow rapper Rick Ross raps the line, "Put molly all in her champagne/ She ain't even know it/ I took her home and I enjoyed that/ She ain't even know it." A petition containing 72,000 signatures was presented to Reebok, demanding they drop Ross as a spokesman for the lyrics which appeared to condone date rape. Ross has apologized for the lyrics, claiming they weren't about rape. He was dropped by Reebok on April 11, 2013. Rocko later dropped the Rick Ross verse in order to get radio play.

=== Lawsuit ===
In June 2016, Hill filed a $10 million lawsuit against his A1 Recordings artist, Future. According to Hill, Future breached his contractual obligation to release 6 albums under the label. Neither artist has announced the settlement.

== Legal issues ==
In December 2024, Rocko was arrested outside of a downtown Atlanta hotel for disorderly conduct, misdemeanor willful obstruction of law enforcement officials, and criminal trespass. He was released on a $1,000 bond.

In March 2015, Rocko was arrested in Monroe County for driving with a suspended license after police received several complaints of him racing a friend at speeds in excess of 150 mph.

== Other ventures ==
=== A1 Recordings ===
A1 Recordings
- Founded: 2003
- Founder: Rocko (CEO)
- Status: Active
- Distributors: E1; Empire
- Genre: Various
- Country of origin: United States
- Location: Atlanta, Georgia, U.S.

A1 Recordings, formerly known as Rocky Road Records, is an Atlanta-based record label formed in 2010 by Hill. On February 16, 2013, it was announced that A1 Recordings will be distributed by E1 Music.

Current artist

- Rocko

Former artist

- Future

Releases

List of albums, with selected chart positions
Year	Artist	Album	Peak chart positions		
Year	Artist	Album	U.S.	U.S. R&B	U.S. Rap
2008	Rocko	Self Made: Released: March 18, 2008; Label: Rocky Road, So So Def, Def Jam; Format: CD, download	21	6	4
2012	Future	Pluto: Released: April 17, 2012; Label: A1, Freebandz, Epic; Format: CD, download	8	2	2
2014	Future	Honest: Released: April 22, 2014; Label: A1, Freebandz, Epic; Format: CD, download	2	1	1
2015	Future	DS2: Released: July 17, 2015; Label: A1, Freebandz, Epic; Format: CD, download	1	1	1
2016	Future	Evol: February 6, 2016; Label: A1, Freebandz, Epic; Format: CD, download	1	1	1
2017	Future	Future: Released: February 17, 2017; Label: A1, Freebandz, Epic; Format: CD, download	1	1	1
2017	Future	Hndrxx: Released: February 24, 2017; Label: A1, Freebandz, Epic; Format: CD, download	1	1	1

== Discography ==
Studio albums

- Self Made (2008)

== Filmography ==
=== Films ===
- 2015: The Spot (as Lehgo)

=== Television ===
- 2009: Monica: Still Standing (guest stars as himself)
- 2013: Love & Hip Hop: Atlanta season 2 (stars as himself)
- 2013: T.I. and Tiny: The Family Hustle (guest stars as himself)
