= Project Pat discography =

- Studio albums: 10
- Compilation albums: 1
- Singles: 14
- Mixtapes: 19

The discography of American hip hop recording artist Project Pat consists of ten studio albums (one of which in collaboration with Nasty Mane), nineteen mixtapes, one compilation album and fourteen singles (including four as a featured artist).

== Albums ==
=== Studio albums ===
List of studio albums, with selected chart positions and sales figures
Title	Album details	Peak chart positions			Certifications
Title	Album details	US	US R&B /HH	US Rap	Certifications
Ghetty Green	Released: September 14, 1999; Label: Hypnotize Minds, Loud; Format: CD, LP, cassette, digital download	52	9	—	
Mista Don't Play: Everythangs Workin	Released: February 27, 2001; Label: Hypnotize Mind, Loud; Format: CD, LP, cassette, digital download	4	2	—	RIAA: Gold
Layin' da Smack Down	Released: August 6, 2002; Label: Hypnotize Minds, Loud, Columbia; Format: CD, LP, cassette, digital download	12	5	—	
Crook by da Book: The Fed Story	Released: December 5, 2006; Label: Hypnotize Minds, Sony Urban Music, Columbia; Format: CD, digital download	64	10	5	
Walkin' Bank Roll	Released: October 30, 2007; Label: Hypnotize Minds, Koch; Format: CD, digital download	47	6	3	
Real Recognize Real	Released: February 24, 2009; Label: Hypnotize Minds, Asylum; Format: CD, digital download	70	12	3	
Loud Pack	Released: July 19, 2011; Label: Hypnotize Minds; Format: CD, digital download	—	44	—	
Mista Don't Play 2: Everythangs Money	Released: April 14, 2015; Label: E1 Music; Format: CD, digital download	—	43	—	
M.O.B.	Released: September 8, 2017; Label: X-Ray; Format: CD, LP, digital download	—	—	—	

=== Collaborative albums ===
Title	Album details	Peak chart positions
Title	Album details	US R&B /HH
Belly on Full 2 (with Nasty Mane)	Released: October 2, 2012; Label: Money Train; Format: CD, digital download	58
DEM GOATS (with Juicy J)	Released: July 10, 2026; Label: Trippy Music, STEM; Format: CD, digital download	-

=== Compilation albums ===
List of compilation albums, with year released
Title	Album details	Peak chart positions		
Title	Album details	US	US R&B /HH	US Ind.
Murderers & Robbers	Released: July 25, 2000; Label: Project, Street Level; Format: CD, digital download	176	45	14

== Mixtapes ==
List of mixtapes, with year released
Title	Mixtape details	Peak chart positions		
Title	Mixtape details	US R&B /HH	US Rap	US Ind.
Solo Tape	Released: 1993; Label: Self-released w/ DJ Paul & Juicy J; Format: Cassette	—	—	—
Mix Tape: The Appeal	Released: November 4, 2003; Label: Hypnotize Minds; Format: CD, cassette	37	—	12
Gangsta Grillz, Vol. 15: The Welcome Home Party	Released: February 28, 2006; Label: Hypnotize Minds; Format: Digital download	—	—	—
What Cha Starin At?	Released: August 21, 2007; Label: Hypnotize Minds; Format: CD, digital download	23	10	45
Play Me Some Pimpin (with Juicy J)	Released: April 28, 2009; Label: Hypnotize Minds; Format: CD, digital download	—	—	—
Play Me Some Pimpin 2 (with Juicy J)	Released: October 9, 2009; Label: Self-released; Format: Digital download	—	—	—
Cut Throat (with Juicy J)	Released: November 26, 2009; Label: Self-released; Format: Digital download	—	—	—
Cut Throat 2 (Dinner Thieves) (with Juicy J)	Released: March 16, 2010; Label: Self-released; Format: Digital download	—	—	—
Cocaine Mafia (with Juicy J and French Montana)	Released: December 20, 2011; Label: Self-released; Format: Digital download	—	—	—
Belly On Full (with Nasty Mane)	Released: February 5, 2012; Label: Self-released; Format: Digital download	—	—	—
Cheez N Dope	Released: January 9, 2013; Label: Project, Taylor Gang; Format: Digital download	—	—	—
Cheez N Dope 2	Released: September 6, 2013; Label: Project, Taylor Gang; Format: Digital download	—	—	—
Cheez N Dope 3: Street God	Released: December 17, 2014; Label: Project, Taylor Gang; Format: Digital download	—	—	—
Pistol & A Scale	Released: August 12, 2015; Label: Project, Taylor Gang; Format: Digital download	—	—	—
Street God: Street Testimony	Released: December 16, 2015; Label: Project, Taylor Gang; Format: Digital download	—	—	—
Street God 2: God Bless the Streets	Released: February 26, 2016; Label: Project, Taylor Gang; Format: Digital download	—	—	—
Street God 3: Louis Vuitton Don	Released: July 12, 2016; Label: Project, Taylor Gang; Format: Digital download	—	—	—
Street God 4: Tried & True	Released: November 16, 2016; Label: Project, Taylor Gang; Format: Digital download	—	—	—
Real Gz Make Gz (with Big Trill)	Released: 2017; Label: Project, Taylor Gang; Format: Digital download	—	—	—

== Singles ==
=== As lead artist ===
List of singles, with selected chart positions, showing year released and album name
Title	Year	Peak chart positions			Album
Title	Year	US	US R&B /HH	US Rap	Album
"Ballers" (featuring Gangsta Boo)	1999	—	75	—	Ghetty Green
"Chickenhead" (featuring Three 6 Mafia and La Chat)	2000	87	24	29	Mista Don't Play: Everythangs Workin'
"Don't Save Her" (featuring Crunchy Black)	2001	—	73	—	Mista Don't Play: Everythangs Workin'
"Good Googly Moogly" (featuring Juicy J and DJ Paul)	2006	—	78	—	Crook by da Book: The Fed Story
"Don't Call Me No Mo" (featuring Three 6 Mafia)	2007	—	—	—	Walkin' Bank Roll
"Never Be a G" (featuring Juicy J and Doe B)	2014	—	—	—	Mista Don't Play 2: Everythangs Money
"Gettin' It" (featuring Big Trill and Chevy Woods)	2014	—	—	—	Cheeze N Dope 3
"Twerk It" (featuring Ty Dolla Sign, Wiz Khalifa, and Wale)	2015	—	—	—	Mista Don't Play 2: Everythangs Money
"30" (featuring Young M.A, Coca Vango, Big Trill, and Wale)	2016	—	—	—	Street God 4
"Racks" (featuring Gucci Mane and Rich the Kid)	2018	—	—	—	—N/a
"—" denotes a recording that did not chart or was not released in that territory.

=== As featured artist ===
Title	Year	Peak chart positions								Certifications	Album
Title	Year	US	US R&B /HH	US Rap	AUS	CAN	NZ	UK	WW	Certifications	Album
"Sippin' on Some Syrup" (Three 6 Mafia featuring UGK and Project Pat)	2000	—	30	—	—	—	—	—	—		When the Smoke Clears: Sixty 6, Sixty 1
"Side 2 Side" (Three 6 Mafia featuring Bow Wow and Project Pat)	2006	— (Note: "Side 2 Side" did not enter the Billboard Hot 100, but peaked at number 15 on the Bubbling Under Hot 100 chart.)	63	—	—	—	—	—	—		Most Known Unknown
"Lolli Lolli (Pop That Body)" (Three 6 Mafia featuring Yung D, SuperPower, and Project Pat)	2008	18	48	7	—	62	5	—	—	RIAA: Platinum	Last 2 Walk
"KK" (Wiz Khalifa featuring Juicy J and Project Pat)	2014	— (Note: "KK" did not enter the Billboard Hot 100, but peaked at number eight on the Bubbling Under Hot 100 chart.)	35	25	—	—	—	—	—		Blacc Hollywood
"Knife Talk" (Drake and 21 Savage featuring Project Pat)	2021	4	2	2	13	6	13	87	6	ARIA: 2× Platinum; RMNZ: Gold; BPI: Gold; RIAA: 5× Platinum	Certified Lover Boy
"外交官 (WaiJiaoGuan, Diplomat)" (Skai Isyourgod featuring Project Pat)	2026	—	—	—	—	—	—	—	—		—N/a
"—" denotes a recording that did not chart or was not released in that territory.

== Guest appearances ==
List of guest appearances, with other performing artists, showing year released and album name
Year	Title	Original and/or other performer(s)	Album
1996	"Where da Killaz Hang"	Three 6 Mafia	Chapter 1: The End
1997	"Prophet Posse"	Three 6 Mafia	Chapter 2: World Domination
1997	"Who Got Dem 9's"	Three 6 Mafia	Chapter 2: World Domination
1997	"Body Parts 2"	Three 6 Mafia	Chapter 2: World Domination
1997	"Land of the Lost"	Three 6 Mafia	Chapter 2: World Domination
1998	"Dead Man Don't Talk"	Indo G	Angel Dust
1998	"Fly Straight"	Indo G	Angel Dust
1998	"This Is Personal"	Gangsta Boo	Enquiring Minds
1998	"Who We Be?"	Gangsta Boo	Enquiring Minds
1999	"Who The Crunkest"	Tear Da Club Up Thugs	CrazyNDaLazDayz
1999	"Elbow a Nigga"	Tear Da Club Up Thugs	CrazyNDaLazDayz
1999	"What You Lookin' For"	Tear Da Club Up Thugs	CrazyNDaLazDayz
2000	"Sippin' on Some Syrup"	Three 6 Mafia, UGK	When the Smoke Clears: Sixty 6, Sixty 1
2000	"Weak Azz Bitch"	Three 6 Mafia, La Chat	When the Smoke Clears: Sixty 6, Sixty 1
2001	"U Claimin' You're Real"	La Chat	Murder She Spoke
2001	"Chop Shop"	Gangsta Boo	Both Worlds *69
2001	"Dis Bitch, Dat Hoe"	Three 6 Mafia, Ludacris	Choices: The Album
2001	"Mafia"	Three 6 Mafia	Choices: The Album
2001	"They Don't Fuck wit U"	Three 6 Mafia	Choices: The Album
2001	"Ridin' On Chrome"	Three 6 Mafia	Choices: The Album
2002	"Cyazzndalot"	DJ Paul	Underground Volume 16: For da Summa
2002	"North, North Pt. 2"	Juicy J	Chronicles of the Juice Man
2002	"Who da Buckest"	Juicy J, Frayser Boy	Chronicles of the Juice Man
2003	"Try Somethin'"	Three 6 Mafia	Da Unbreakables
2005	"Fuckem"	Frayser Boy	Me Being Me
2005	"Roll with It"	Three 6 Mafia	Most Known Unknown
2005	"Knock Tha Black Off Yo Ass"	Three 6 Mafia	Most Known Unknown
2005	"Body Parts 3"	Three 6 Mafia, Lil Wyte, BoogieMane, Frayser Boy, Chrome	Most Known Unknown
2005	"Stay Fly (Remix)"	Three 6 Mafia, Trick Daddy, Slim Thug	Most Known Unknown
2005	"Side 2 Side"	Three 6 Mafia, Kanye West	Most Known Unknown
2005	"Poppin' My Collar" Remix	Three 6 Mafia, DMX	Most Known Unknown
2007	"Feelin' Real Pimpish"	Lil Wyte	The One and Only
2007	"Choppa on da Back Seat"	Lil Wyte	The One and Only
2007	"Dat Boy"	Lil Wyte	The One and Only
2007	"Relax And Take Notes"	8Ball & MJG	Ridin High
2008	"I Got"	Three 6 Mafia, Pimp C	Last 2 Walk
2008	"First 48"	Three 6 Mafia, Al Kapone, 8Ball & MJG, Spanish Fly	Last 2 Walk
2008	"Lolli Lolli (Pop That Body)"	Three 6 Mafia, Superpower, Young D	Last 2 Walk
2008	"Trap Boom"	Three 6 Mafia	Last 2 Walk
2008	"Get Ya Rob"	Three 6 Mafia	Last 2 Walk
2008	"Dirty Bitch"	Three 6 Mafia	Last 2 Walk
2008	"Built Like Dat"	Three 6 Mafia	Last 2 Walk
2009	"30 Inches"	Juicy J, Gucci Mane	Hustle Till I Die
2009	"Fiyayaya Weed"	Juicy J	Hustle Till I Die
2009	"Ugh Ugh Ugh"	Juicy J, Webbie	Hustle Till I Die
2009	"Purple Kush"	Juicy J, Gorilla Zoe	Hustle Till I Die
2009	"Get Me Some Money"	Juicy J, V-Slash	Hustle Till I Die
2009	"Some Other Shit"	Lil Wyte, DJ Paul	The Bad Influence
2009	"Oxy Cotton"	Lil Wyte, Juicy J	The Bad Influence
2009	"I Say Yes"	Lil Wyte	The Bad Influence
2009	"That's What It Is"	Lil Wyte	The Bad Influence
2011	"Workin' wit Dem People"	Lil Wyte, JellyRoll, BPZ	Year Round
2011	"Whad Up"	Lil Wyte, JellyRoll	Year Round
2011	"Posse Song"	Lil Wyte, JellyRoll, BPZ, DJ Paul, Juicy J, V-Slash, Lil Reno	Year Round
2011	"Outro"		Year Round
2012	"Money"	Lil Wyte, Partee, Miss Wyte	Still Doubted?
2012	"Pill Popper"	Lord Infamous, Lil Wyte, Partee	Back from tha Dead: Deadly Proverbs
2012	"Re-Up"	DJ Paul	A Person of Interest
2013	"No Heart No Love"	Juicy J	Stay Trippy
2014	"Elvis Presley Blvd."	Rick Ross	Hood Billionaire
2014	"KK"	Wiz Khalifa, Juicy J	Blacc Hollywood
2016	"Breaking News"	Wiz Khalifa, Juicy J	TGOD Mafia: Rude Awakening
2016	"Scorpion Death Drop"	The Sparks Foundation, A$AP Twelvyy, Smoke DZA, Trae tha Truth	Parts Unknown
2016	"Wake Up"	DJ Paul	YOTS (Year of the Six) Pt. 1
2016	"Kansas City / Drug Runner"	Berner, Young Dolph	Hempire
2017	"Feed the Streets"	Juicy J, A$AP Rocky	Rubba Band Business
2017	"Bundle"	Berner, Young Dolph, OJ da Juiceman	Tracking Numbers
2017	”Watch Money Fall”	Juicy J, Rick Ross	Highly Intoxicated
2017	”PETTY”	Juicy J, Go	Highly Intoxicated
2018	"Stacking"	Riff Raff	Cool Blue Jewels
2018	”Play Wit My Gun”	Juicy J	Shutdafukup
2018	”Chewing Gum”	Dev Hynes, A$AP Rocky	Negro Swan
2018	"Mug Up"	Kool Keith	Controller of Trap
2018	"HowToRobAGrave"	Bones	TheManInTheRadiator
2018	"Good Day"	21 Savage, Schoolboy Q	I Am > I Was
2018	"Money Call"	Coach Peake, FattBoi Pimp	Non-album single
2019	"Gold Teeth"	Blood Orange, Gangsta Boo, Tinashe	Angel's Pulse
2020	"Memphis To LA"	Juicy J, Jay Rock	The Hustle Continues
2020	"Red Dot"	Juicy J	The Hustle Continues
2021	"Knife Talk"	Drake, 21 Savage	Certified Lover Boy
2021	"RIP Young" Remix	Isaiah Rashad, Juicy J	The House Is Burning
2021	"Fold Dat Money Up"	Gucci Mane	Ice Daddy
2022	"Backseat"	Juicy J, Wiz Khalifa	Stone's Night
2023	"Rubber Boots"	Tom MacDonald, Adam Calhoun	The Brave II
2024	"Sked"	Denzel Curry, Kenny Mason	King of the Mischievous South Vol. 2
2025	"Get Right"	Juicy J, Logic	Live And In Color
2025	"20 Years Later"	Juicy J, Logic	Live And In Color
2025	"Make It Home"	Juicy J	Head On Swivel
2025	"Nobody Really Safe"	Juicy J	Head On Swivel
2025	"Everywhere We Go"	Bun B, Cory Mo, Juicy J, Pimp C	Way Mo Trill
2025	"ICED TEA"	Young Nudy, 21 Savage, Coupe	PARADISE
