= Juicy J production discography =

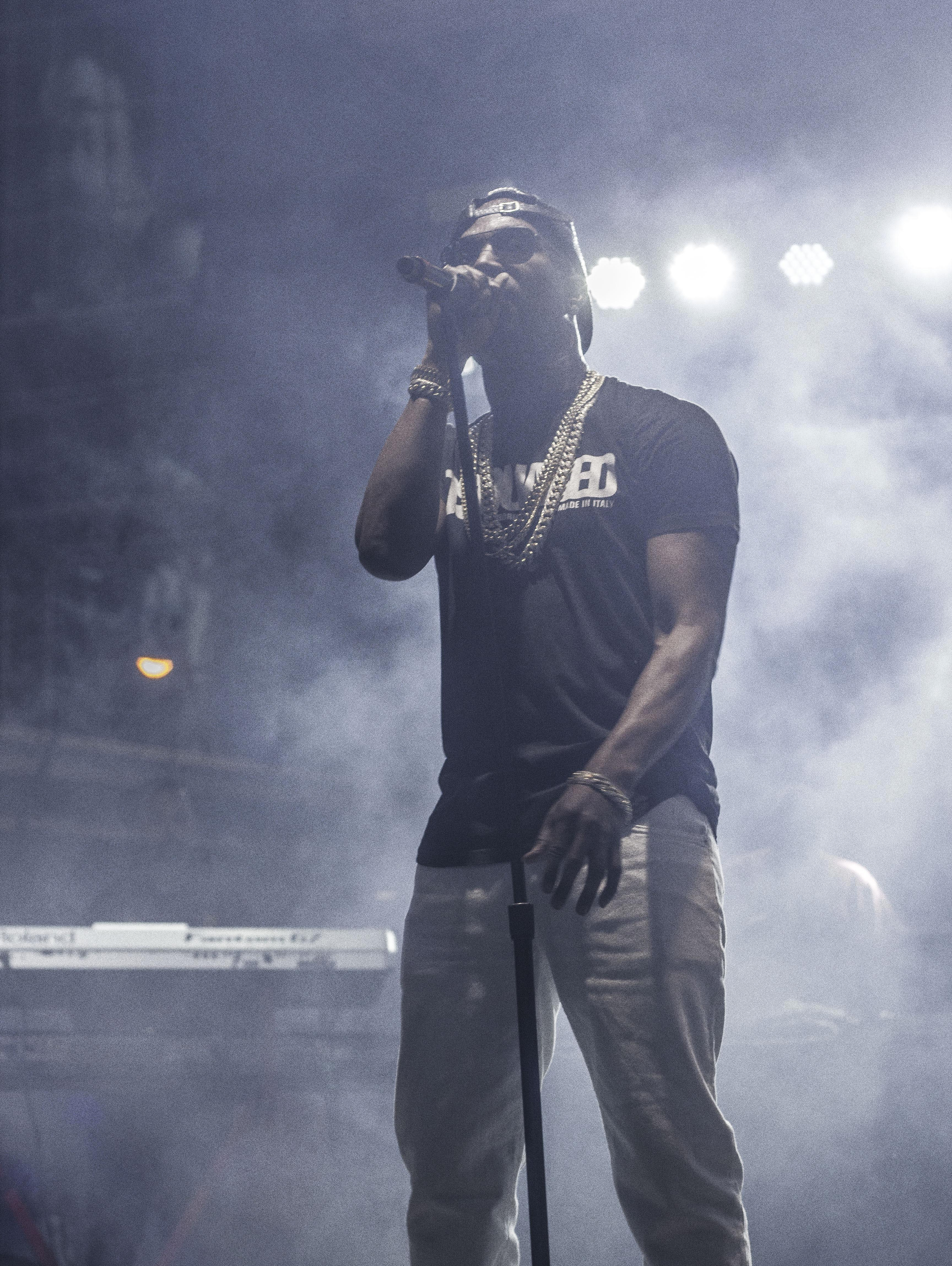
Juicy J in 2014

The following list is a discography of production by American rapper and producer Juicy J. It includes a list of songs produced, co-produced and remixed by year, artist, album and title. For the Three 6 Mafia and Hypnotize Minds projects Juicy J produced music alongside his Three Six Mafia cohort DJ Paul and in more recent years Crazy Mike.

== Albums produced ==
List of albums produced or co-produced by Juicy J
Album	Year	Artist
Smoked Out, Loced Out	1994	Three 6 Mafia
Mystic Stylez	1995	Three 6 Mafia
King of da Playaz Ball	1996	Kingpin Skinny Pimp
Chapter 1: The End	1996	Three 6 Mafia
Chapter 2: World Domination	1997	Three 6 Mafia
Body Parts	1998	Prophet Posse
Angel Dust	1998	Indo G
Kamakazie Timez Up	1998	The Kaze
Enquiring Minds	1998	Gangsta Boo
CrazyNDaLazDayz	1999	Tear da Club Up Thugs
Underground Vol. 1: 1991–1994	1999	Three 6 Mafia
Underground Vol. 2: Club Memphis	1999	Three 6 Mafia
Three 6 Mafia Presents: Hypnotize Camp Posse	2000	Three 6 Mafia
When the Smoke Clears: Sixty 6, Sixty 1	2000	Three 6 Mafia
Underground Vol. 3: Kings of Memphis	2000	Three 6 Mafia
Mista Don't Play: Everythangs Workin	2001	Project Pat
Both Worlds *69	2001	Gangsta Boo
Choices: The Album	2001	Three 6 Mafia
Murder She Spoke	2001	La Chat
Chronicles of the Juice Man	2002	Juicy J
Layin da Smack Down	2002	Project Pat
Doubt Me Now	2003	Lil Wyte
Gone on That Bay	2003	Frayser Boy
Da Unbreakables	2003	Three 6 Mafia
Phinally Phamous	2004	Lil Wyte
Choices II: The Setup	2005	Three 6 Mafia
Most Known Unknown	2005	Three 6 Mafia
On My Own	2006	Crunchy Black
Crook by da Book: The Fed Story	2006	Project Pat
The One and Only	2007	Lil Wyte
From Me to You	2007	Crunchy Black
Walkin' Bank Roll	2007	Project Pat
Last 2 Walk	2008	Three 6 Mafia
Real Recognize Real	2009	Project Pat
Hustle Till I Die	2009	Juicy J
The Bad Influence	2009	Lil Wyte
Year Round	2011	SNO (Lil Wyte, Jelly Roll, and BPZ)
Loud Pack	2011	Project Pat
The Hustle Continues	2020	Juicy J
Stoner's Night	2022	Juicy J and Wiz Khalifa
Space Age Pimpin	2022	Juicy J and Pi'erre Bourne
Ravenite Social Club	2024	Juicy J
Caught Up In This Illusion	2025	Juicy J and Endea Owens

== 1994 ==
=== Triple 6 Mafia - Smoked Out, Loced Out ===
- All tracks (produced with DJ Paul)

== 1995 ==
=== Three 6 Mafia - Mystic Stylez ===
- All tracks (produced with DJ Paul)

== 1996 ==
=== Kingpin Skinny Pimp - King Of Da Playaz Ball ===
- All tracks (produced with DJ Paul)

=== Kingpin Skinny Pimp - Skinny But Dangerous ===
- 01. "Skinny But Dangerous"
- 02. "Give Me Sum" (produced with DJ Paul and Lil' Pat)
- 04. "Drop It Off" (produced with DJ Paul and Lil' Pat)
- 06. "Don't Fuck With Me" (featuring 211) (produced with DJ Paul and Lil' Pat)
- 10-11. (produced with DJ Paul and Lil' Pat)

=== Gangsta Blac - Can It Be ===
- 03. "Powder" (produced with DJ Paul)
- 07-08. (produced with DJ Paul)
- 10. "Where I Dwell" (featuring DJ Paul and Juicy J) (produced with DJ Paul)
- 12. "Don't Trust 'Em" (produced with DJ Paul)
- 16. "Critical" (produced with DJ Paul)
- 18. "Life's A Bitch" (featuring Cool B) (produced with DJ Paul)

=== Three 6 Mafia - Chapter 1: The End ===
- All tracks (produced with DJ Paul)

== 1997 ==
=== Three 6 Mafia - Chapter 2: World Domination ===
- All tracks (produced with DJ Paul)

=== Various Artists - Southwest Riders ===
- 02-11. "Threesixafix"

== 1998 ==
=== Prophet Posse - Body Parts ===
- All tracks (produced with DJ Paul)

=== Indo G - Angel Dust ===
- All tracks (produced with DJ Paul)

=== The Kaze - Kamakazie Timez Up ===
- All tracks (produced with DJ Paul)

=== Gangsta Boo - Enquiring Minds ===
- All tracks (produced with DJ Paul)

== 1999 ==
=== Various Artists - Whiteboys (soundtrack) ===
- 09. "Wanna Be's" (Three 6 Mafia & Project Pat)(produced with DJ Paul)

=== Tear Da Club Up Thugs - CrazyNDaLazDayz ===
- All Tracks (produced with DJ Paul)
  - 14. "Hypnotize Cash Money" (featuring B.G., Lil Wayne, Turk, Juvenile and Birdman) (produced with DJ Paul and Mannie Fresh)

=== Project Pat - Ghetty Green ===
- All Tracks (produced with DJ Paul)
  - 20. "Ballers/Outro" (featuring Turk, Birdman, Juvenile, Three 6 Mafia and Lil Wayne) (produced with DJ Paul and Mannie Fresh)

=== Koopsta Knicca - Da Devil's Playground: Underground Solo ===
- All tracks(produced with DJ Paul)

== 2000 ==
=== Hypnotize Camp Posse - Three 6 Mafia Presents: Hypnotize Camp Posse ===
- All Tracks (produced with DJ Paul)

=== Three 6 Mafia - When the Smoke Clears: Sixty 6, Sixty 1 ===
- All tracks (produced with DJ Paul)

=== Triple Six Mafia - Kings of Memphis Underground Vol. 3 ===
- All Tracks (produced with DJ Paul)

=== Funkmaster Flex - 60 Minutes of Funk, Volume IV: The Mixtape ===
- 22. "Break da Law 2001" (Project Pat and Three 6 Mafia) (produced with DJ Paul)

== 2001 ==
=== Project Pat - Mista Don't Play: Everythangs Workin ===
- All Tracks (produced with DJ Paul)

=== Various Artists - Exit Wounds (soundtrack) ===
- 08. "They Don't Fuck Wit U"

=== Gangsta Boo - Both Worlds *69 ===
- All tracks (produced with DJ Paul)

=== La Chat - Murder She Spoke ===
- All Tracks (produced with DJ Paul)

=== Three 6 Mafia - Choices: The Album ===
- All Tracks (produced with DJ Paul)

== 2002 ==
=== DJ Paul- Underground Volume 16: For da Summa ===
- All Tracks (produced with DJ Paul)

=== Juicy J - Chronicles of the Juice Man ===
- All Tracks (produced with DJ Paul)

=== Project Pat - Layin' da Smack Down ===
- All Tracks (produced with DJ Paul)

=== Da Headbussaz - Dat's How It Happen to'M ===
- All tracks _{(produced with DJ Paul except track 10, produced by Fiend.)}

== 2003 ==
=== Lil Wyte - Doubt Me Now ===
- All tracks (produced with DJ Paul)

=== Frayser Boy - Gone on That Bay ===
- All tracks (produced with DJ Paul)

=== Project Pat - Mix Tape: The Appeal ===
- All Tracks (produced with DJ Paul)

=== Three 6 Mafia - Da Unbreakables ===
- All tracks (produced with DJ Paul)
  - 12. "Rainbow Colors" (featuring Lil' Flip) (produced with DJ Paul and David Banner)

=== Ludacris - Chicken-n-Beer ===
- 07. "Diamond in the Back" (produced with DJ Paul)
- 16. "We Got" (featuring Chingy, I-20 and 2 Chainz) (produced with DJ Paul)

== 2004 ==
=== Goodie Mob - One Monkey Don't Stop No Show ===
- 03. "123 Goodie" (produced with DJ Paul)

=== Young Buck - Straight Outta Cashville ===
- 12. "Stomp" (featuring T.I. and Ludacris) (produced with DJ Paul)
- 13. "Taking Hits" (featuring D-Tay) (produced with DJ Paul)

=== DJ Kay Slay - The Streetsweeper, Vol.2: The Pain From The Game ===
- 13. "Who Gives a Fuck Where You From"(featuring Three 6 Mafia, Frayser Boy, and Lil Wyte) (produced with DJ Paul)

=== I-20 - Self Explanatory ===
- 08. "Hennessey & Hydro" (featuring Three 6 Mafia) (produced with DJ Paul)

=== Lil Wyte - Phinally Phamous ===
- All tracks (produced with DJ Paul)

== 2005 ==
=== Three 6 Mafia - Choices II: The Setup ===
- All tracks (produced with DJ Paul)
  - 06. "It's Whateva Wit Us" (featuring D-Roc and YoungBloodZ) (produced with DJ Paul and Lil Jon)

=== Webbie - Savage Life ===
- 09. "I Got That"(featuring Lil Boosie) (produced with DJ Paul)

=== Frayser Boy - Me Being Me ===
- All Tracks (produced with DJ Paul)

=== Three 6 Mafia - Most Known Unknown ===
- All tracks (produced with DJ Paul)
  - 10. "Half on a Sack" (produced with DJ Paul and David Banner)
  - 18. "Got It 4 Sale"(featuring Chrome) (produced with DJ Paul and Mr. Collipark)

=== Mike Jones - Who Is Mike Jones? ===
- 05. "Got It Sewed Up (Remix)" (produced with DJ Paul)

=== Paul Wall - The Peoples Champ ===
- 01. "I'm A Playa" (featuring Three 6 Mafia) (produced with DJ Paul)

=== Chrome - Straight to the Pros ===
- All Tracks (produced with DJ Paul)

== 2006 ==
=== DJ Kay Slay and Greg Street - The Champions: North Meets South ===
- "Hood Drug Warz" (featuring B.G., Lil Wyte & Three 6 Mafia) (produced with DJ Paul)

=== Blak Jak - Roll da Dice ===
- "Get Right or Get Left" (produced with DJ Paul)

=== Crunchy Black - On My Own ===
- All tracks (produced with DJ Paul)

=== Lil Scrappy - Bred 2 Die, Born 2 Live ===
- 07. "Posted in the Club" (featuring Three 6 Mafia) (produced with DJ Paul)

=== Chingy - Hoodstar ===
- 03. "Club Gettin' Crowded"(featuring Three 6 Mafia) (produced with DJ Paul)

=== Young Jeezy - Thug Motivation 102: The Inspiration ===
- 18. "Hood Rat" (featuring Three 6 Mafia and Project Pat) (produced with DJ Paul)

=== Project Pat - Crook by da Book: The Fed Story ===
- All tracks (produced with DJ Paul)

== 2007 ==
=== Lil' Flip - I Need Mine ===
- 15. "I Just Wanna Tell U" (produced with DJ Paul)
- 28. "3, 2, 1, Go!" (featuring Three 6 Mafia) (produced with DJ Paul)

=== Lil Wyte - The One and Only ===
- All tracks (produced with DJ Paul)

=== Crunchy Black - From Me to You ===
- All tracks (produced with DJ Paul)

=== UGK - Underground Kingz ===
- 02. "Int'l Players Anthem (I Choose You)" (featuring OutKast) (produced with DJ Paul)

=== Project Pat - Walkin' Bank Roll ===
- All tracks (produced with DJ Paul)

== 2008 ==
=== Frayser Boy - Da Key ===
- All Tracks (produced with DJ Paul)

=== Three 6 Mafia - Last 2 Walk ===
- All tracks (produced with DJ Paul)
  - 06. "I'd Rather" (featuring Unk) (produced with DJ Montay)
  - 07. "That's Right" (featuring Akon) (produced with Akon and Giorgio Tuinfort)
  - 16. "My Own Way" (featuring Good Charlotte) _{(produced with Dead Executives)}
  - 21. "Lolli Lolli (Pop That Body)" (featuring Project Pat, Superpower & Young D) _{(produced with Superpower)}
  - 22. "My Own Way (Remix)" (featuring Good Charlotte) _{(produced with Dead Executives)}

== 2009 ==
=== Project Pat - Real Recognize Real ===
- All tracks (produced with DJ Paul)

=== Juicy J - Hustle Till I Die ===
- All tracks

=== Lil Wyte - The Bad Influence ===
- All tracks (produced with DJ Paul)

=== Freddie Gibbs - Midwestgangstaboxframecadillacmuzik ===
- 15. "Just Tryin' ta Make It" (produced with DJ Paul)

=== Lil B - 6 Kiss ===
- 22. "Smoke Trees Fxxx Hoes" (produced with DJ Paul)

== 2010 ==
=== Quincy Jones - Q Soul Bossa Nostra ===
- 14. "Hikky-Burr" (feat. Three 6 Mafia)

== 2011 ==
=== SNO - Year Round ===
- All tracks (produced with DJ Paul)

=== Juicy J and Lex Luger - Rubba Band Business 2 ===
- 05. "Durr She Go" (featuring Travis Porter) (produced with Billy Wes and Teezio)
- 09. "Stoner's Night" (produced with Teezio)

=== Project Pat - Loud Pack ===
- All tracks (produced with DJ Paul)

=== Ludacris - 1.21 Gigawatts: Back to the First Time ===
- 07. "Say It to My Face" (featuring Meek Mill)

=== Juicy J - Blue Dream and Lean ===
- 02. "Drugged Out" (produced with Lex Luger)
- 04. "Errbody Wave"
- 09. "Lucky Charm" (produced with Crazy Mike)
- 13. "Got a New One" (produced with Crazy Mike)
- 20. "Gotta Stay Strapped" (featuring Alley Boy and Project Pat)
- 25. "Deez Bitches Rollin'" (featuring SpaceGhostPurrp and Speakz) (produced with Crazy Mike)

== 2012 ==
=== Hodgy Beats - Untitled EP ===
- 01. "Bullshittin"

=== Lil B - God's Father ===
- 08. "Keep It 100" (produced with DJ Paul)

=== Future - Pluto ===
- 06. "I'm Trippin'" (featuring Juicy J)

=== Juicy J - Blue Dream & Lean (Bonus Tracks) ===
- 01. "I Won't Miss Ya"
- 08. "Codeine Cups" (produced with Crazy Mike)

=== Berner - Urban Farmer ===
- 16. "Fly As Us" (featuring Juicy J and Maejor) (produced with Crazy Mike)

=== Nicki Minaj - Pink Friday: Roman Reloaded – The Re-Up ===
- 06. "I Endorse These Strippers" (featuring Tyga and Thomas Brinx) (produced with Crazy Mike)

== 2013 ==
=== Lil Wayne - I Am Not a Human Being II ===
- 04. "Gunwalk" (featuring Gudda Gudda) (produced with Crazy Mike)
- 07. "Trigger Finger" (featuring Soulja Boy) (produced with Crazy Mike)
- 10. "Trippy" (featuring Juicy J) (produced with Crazy Mike)

=== Funkmaster Flex - Who You Mad At? Me or Yourself? ===
- 34. "Want Some Have Some" (featuring Juicy J)

=== DJ Scream - The Ratchet Superior EP ===
- 03. "Come Up Off of That" (featuring Juicy J, Migos and Project Pat) _{(produced with Crazy Mike)}

=== Wale - The Gifted ===
- 09. "Clappers" (featuring Nicki Minaj and Juicy J) (produced with Mark Henry, Kane Beatz and No Credit)

=== Juicy J - Stay Trippy ===
- 02. "Smokin' Rollin" (featuring Pimp C) (produced with Crazy Mike)
- 04. "So Much Money" (produced with Lex Luger and Crazy Mike)
- 06-07. (produced with Crazy Mike)
- 11. "Money a Do It" (produced with Crazy Mike)

== 2014 ==
=== Wiz Khalifa - 28 Grams ===
- 15. "Word on the Town" (featuring Juicy J and Pimp C) (produced with Lil Awree and Crazy Mike)

=== Lil Bibby - Free Crack 2 ===
- 7. "Montana" (featuring Juicy J) (produced with Lil Awree and Crazy Mike)

== 2015 ==
=== Juicy J - Blue Dream & Lean 2 ===
- 2. "Stoners Night" (produced with Lil Awree and Crazy Mike)
- 8. "Denna Bitch" (featuring Project Pat) (produced with Lil Awree and Crazy Mike)
- 10. "All I Need" (featuring K CAMP) (produced with Big Fruit, Lil Awree, and Crazy Mike)
- 12. "Don't" (produced with Lil Awree and Crazy Mike)
- 14. "Do It To 'Em" (featuring Elle Varner) (produced with Lil Awree and Crazy Mike)
- 15. "Deep Down South" (featuring Project Pat) (produced with Lil Awree and Crazy Mike)

=== Project Pat - Mista Don't Play 2: Everythangs Money ===
- 01. "Tunnel Vision" (produced with Lil Awree)
- 02. "Pull a Move" (produced with Crazy Mike)
- 03. "Gooned Up" (featuring Bankroll Fresh) (produced with Lil Awree)
- 05. "Crash Out" (produced with Lil Awree)
- 06. "I Like to Smokeaaaa" (produced with Crazy Mike)
- 11. "Twerk It" (featuring Ty Dolla $ign, Wiz Khalifa and Wale) (produced with K.E. on the Track and Lil Awree)
- 13-14 (produced with Lil Awree)
- 16. "Trying To Get a Dollar" (produced with Lil Awree)
- 17. "Makin Plays" (produced with Lil Awree and Deezy Beats)

=== A$AP Rocky - At. Long. Last. ASAP ===
- 12. "Wavybone" (featuring Juicy J and UGK) (produced with Hector Delgado)

=== Pimp C - Long Live the Pimp ===
- 08. "Payday" (featuring Juicy J)
- 13. "Friends" (featuring Juicy J and Nas) (produced with Lil Awree and Crazy Mike)

=== Juicy J - 100% Juice ===
- 05. "Ain't No Rapper" (featuring G Herbo) (produced with Lil Awree and Crazy Mike)

=== Juicy J - O's to Oscars ===
- 06. "Disrespectin" (featuring D.C. Young Fly) _{(produced with Lex Luger, Lil Awree and Crazy Mike)}

== 2016 ==
=== Wiz Khalifa - Khalifa ===
- 06. "Bake Sale" (featuring Travis Scott) _{(produced with TM88, Lex Luger, DJ Spinz, and Crazy Mike)}

=== Juicy J, Wiz Khalifa and TM88 - TGOD Mafia: Rude Awakening ===
- 08. "Green Suicide" (produced with TM88)
- 13. "Luxury Flow" (produced with TM88 and Crazy Mike)
- 14. "Stay the Same" (produced with TM88 and CuBeatz)

=== Juicy J - Lit in Ceylon ===
- 16. "Road Tt Sri Lanka" (produced with Crazy Mike)

=== Juicy J ===
- "Ballin'" (featuring Kanye West) (produced with Crazy Mike, TM88 and CuBeatz)

=== Taylor Gang - TGOD, Volume 1 ===
- 05. "Feeling Faded" (Juicy J, Wiz Khalifa and Project Pat) (produced with Lil Awree and Crazy Mike)

=== DRAM - Big Baby DRAM ===
- 22. "Gilligan" (featuring A$AP Rocky and Juicy J) (produced with DRAM)

== 2017 ==
=== Desiigner ===
- "Up" (produced with CashMoneyAP and Crazy Mike)

=== Juicy J - Gas Face ===
- 08. "Focus" (produced with Crazy Mike and DJ Fu)

=== Juicy J - Highly Intoxicated ===
- 02. "Highly Intoxicated" (produced with Crazy Mike)
- 14-15 (produced with Crazy Mike)

=== Juicy J - Rubba Band Business ===
- 02. "Feed the Streets" (featuring Project Pat and A$AP Rocky) (produced with Metro Boomin and G Koop)
- 13. "On & On" (featuring Tory Lanez and Belly) (produced with Ben Billions, R. City, DannyBoyStyles and Mel & Mus)

== 2018 ==
=== Juicy J - SHUTDAFUKUP ===
- 19. "Malia OG" (produced with Crazy Mike)

=== Henry AZ - Just Another PhAZe ===
- 07. "Backwood and Blue Dream" (featuring Juicy J) (produced with Crazy Mike)

=== YKOM - 901 Drip ===
- 11. "Built (Like That)" (produced with YK808 and Doughboy)

=== $uicideboy$ - I Want to Die in New Orleans ===
- 06. "Phantom Menace" (produced with Budd Dwyer)

== 2019 ==
=== Megan Thee Stallion - Fever ===
- 03. "Pimpin" (produced with Crazy Mike and DJ Suede)
- 07. "Simon Says" (featuring Juicy J) (produced with Crazy Mike)
- 10. "Dance" (produced with Crazy Mike)

=== Megan Thee Stallion ===
- "Hot Girl Summer" (featuring Ty Dolla $ign and Nicki Minaj) (produced with Crazy Mike and Bone Collector)

=== Juicy J ===
- "Three Point Stance" (featuring Megan Thee Stallion and City Girls) (produced with Crazy Mike)

=== French Montana - MONTANA ===
- 03. "50's & 100's" (featuring Juicy J)
- 13. "Twisted" (featuring Juicy J, Logic, and A$AP Rocky)

=== Ty Dolla $ign ===
- "Hottest in the City" (featuring Juicy J and Project Pat) (produced with Crazy Mike, Tay Keith and Yada Yada)

== 2020 ==
=== Duke Deuce - Memphis Massacre 2 ===
- 03. "Crunk Ain't Dead [Remix]" (featuring Lil Jon, Juicy J and Project Pat) _{(produced with DJ Paul)}

=== Juicy J ===
- "Hella Fuckin' Trauma"

=== Duki - 24 ===
- "24" (featuring Kidd Keo) (produced with Club Hats, Bone Collector, and Ciaga)

=== IDK - IDK & FRIENDS 2 ===
- 08. "495" (featuring Rico Nasty, Big Flock, Big Jam, and Weensey) (produced with IDK and Acyde)

=== Young Dolph - Rich Slave ===
- 03. "To Be Honest"
- 10. "RNB" (featuring Megan Thee Stallion) _{(produced with Sosa808)}

=== T.I. - The L.I.B.R.A. ===
- 08. "Hypno" (featuring Rahky)

=== Megan Thee Stallion - Good News ===
- 07. "Freaky Girls" (featuring SZA)
- 10. "Work That" (produced with Z3N)
- 14. "Outside"

=== Juicy J - THE HUSTLE CONTINUES ===
- All tracks
  - 02. "GAH DAMN HIGH" (featuring Wiz Khalifa) (produced with Lex Luger)
  - 08. "1995" (featuring Logic) (produced with 6ix)
  - 11. "LOAD IT UP" (featuring NLE Choppa) (produced with Taz Taylor, Pharaoh Vice and DT)
  - 12. "SHE GON POP IT" (featuring Megan Thee Stallion and Ty Dolla Sign) (produced with TrapMoneyBenny)

== 2021 ==
=== Juicy J - THE HUSTLE STILL CONTINUES (Deluxe) ===
- All tracks
  - 05. "TAKE IT" (featuring Rico Nasty and Lord Infamous) (produced with 6ix)
  - 09. "HUSTLING & GRINDING" (featuring ReyLovesU and Duki) (produced with Bone Collector and Danny Wolf)
  - 18. "ALL THE TIME HIGH" (featuring Kaash Paige) (produced with Abaz, X-plosive, Habib Defoundoux and Bone Collector)
  - 21. "STOP CAPPIN" (produced with Grimm)

=== Megan Thee Stallion - Something for Thee Hotties ===
- 01. "Tuned In Freestyle" _{(produced with Romano)}
- 04. "Southside Forever Freestyle" _{(produced with LilJuMadeDaBeat)}
- 18. "Pipe Up" (produced with Crazy Mike)

=== Chief Keef - 4NEM ===
- 13. "Hadouken" (produced with DJ Paul)

== 2022 ==
=== Juicy J and Wiz Khalifa - Stoner's Night ===
- All tracks
  - 02. "Weak" (featuring BIG30) (produced with Lex Luger)
  - 03. "Pop That Trunk" (produced with LilJuMadeDaBeat)
  - 04. "Big Game" (produced with Lex Luger)
  - 06. "Throw It" (produced with Hitkidd)
  - 07-08. (produced with Lex Luger)
  - 09. "Ass For Days" (produced with Lex Luger and Crazy Mike)
  - 10. "Club Close" (produced with Crazy Mike and Grimm)
  - 11-12. (produced with Crazy Mike)
  - 13. "Invest" (produced with Bryan Yepes, Lex Luger and Crazy Mike)

=== Juicy J and Duke Deuce ===
- "Step Back" (produced with LilJuMadeDaBeat)

=== Duke Deuce - CRUNKSTAR ===
- 16. "FLIP DA SWITCH" (featuring Juicy J) (produced with Pliznaya)

=== Juicy J and Pi'erre Bourne - Space Age Pimpin' ===
- All tracks (produced with Pi'erre Bourne)
  - 11. "Unsolved Mystery" (produced with Pi'erre Bourne and Hitkidd)

=== Megan Thee Stallion - Traumazine ===
- 17. "Southside Royalty Freestyle" (featuring Sauce Walka, Big Pokey and Lil' Keke) (produced with Mr.Lee713)

=== Snoop Dogg - Gangsta Grillz: I Still Got It ===
- 09. "Been Smokin" (featuring Juicy J) (produced with RONNY J, Tupun and RicoOnTheKeys)

=== Juicy J, Lex Luger and Trap-A-Holics - Crypto Business ===
- 01. "Night In The Club" (produced with Lex Luger)
- 02. "Cause I Live It" (featuring Wiz Khalifa) (produced with Lex Luger and Grimm)
- 03. "Be Careful" (featuring Finesse2Tymes) (produced with Hitkidd)
- 05. "Hit The Smoke" (produced with Crazy Mike)
- 07. "Kill Dat Sh.." (featuring BeatKing) (produced with BeatKing)
- 09-11. (produced with Lex Luger)
- 12. "Shrooms Remix" (produced with LXST CXNTURY)
- 13. "Clap" (featuring Trey Drizzle) (produced with Hitkidd)
- 14. "Mind Yo Business" (featuring La Chat)
- 15. "Let It Go" (produced with Lex Luger and Crazy Mike)
- 16. "Hot Sauce" (produced with Crazy Mike and Grimm)

== 2023 ==
=== Conway the Machine - Won't He Do It ===
- 14. "Super Bowl" (produced with Crazy Mike)

=== Juicy J - Mental Trillness ===
- 08. "Drink To Escape" (produced with Hitkidd)
- 10-11. (produced with Hitkidd and Crazy Mike)
- 13. "No Rapper" (featuring K Carbon, Slimeroni and Aleza) (produced with Hitkidd)
- 14. "Pay Attention" (produced with Hitkidd and Crazy Mike)
- 16. "Work Out" (featuring Finesse2Tymes) (produced with Hitkidd and Crazy Mike)

=== GloRilla ===
- "Lick or Sum" (produced with Derrick Milano)

=== Sexyy Red – Hood Hottest Princess ===
- 06. "Sexyy Walk" (produced with DJ Paul)

=== City Girls – RAW ===
- 08. "Fancy Ass Bitch" (featuring Juicy J) (produced with Spiff Sinatra, Ben10k, Danes Blood, The Monarch and Derrick Milano)

=== 2 Chainz and Lil Wayne – Welcome 2 Collegrove ===
- 05. "Long Story Short" (produced with Big K.R.I.T. and Mannie Fresh)

=== SXMPRA and Juicy J ===
- "BUSINESS MAN" (produced with Hitkidd)

== 2024 ==
=== Lyrical Lemonade – All Is Yellow ===
- 05. "First Night" (Teezo Touchdown, Juicy J, Cochise, Denzel Curry and Lil B) (produced with Crazy Mike, Car!ton, Daniyel, Jacob Wice, marvy ayy and Cole Bennett)

=== Juicy J – Mental Trillness 2 ===
- 02-11. (produced with Hitkidd)
- 14. "On The Way" (featuring idontknowjeffery and Xavier Wulf) (produced with Adkins)

=== Megan Thee Stallion – MEGAN ===
- 12. "Paper Together" (featuring UGK) (produced with Go Grizzly)
- 17. "Moody Girl" (produced with Hitkidd)

=== Juicy J and Xavier Wulf – Memphis Zoo ===
- 03-04. (produced with Hitkidd)
- 08-09. (produced with Hitkidd)
- 10. "Chuuurch"
- 11. "Don't Let Em See" (produced with JR Swiftz and Quintin Lamb)
- 12. "The Disappointment"

=== Juicy J - Ravenite Social Club ===
- All tracks
  - 02-05. (produced with JR Swiftz)
  - 08. "Deserve It" (featuring Emi Secrest) (produced with JR Swiftz)
  - 10-12. (produced with JR Swiftz)
  - 13. "Suicide Doors" (featuring Cordae) (produced with JR Swiftz and Moo Latte)
  - 15. "To You" (featuring Robert Glasper and Emi Secrest) (produced with Robert Glasper)

== 2025 ==
=== Wiz Khalifa – Kush + Orange Juice 2 ===
- 12. "My Influence" (featuring Juicy J) (produced with Crazy Mike)
- 19. "Khalifa's Home" (produced with Crazy Mike and Mike WiLL Made-It)

=== Juicy J – Head On Swivel ===
- 01. "Undeserved" (produced with Hitkidd)
- 03. "Make It Home" (featuring Project Pat) (produced with Hitkidd)
- 09. "Scam Likely"
- 12. "Achieve It" (featuring Denzel Curry) (produced with Crazy Mike)
- 14. "Nobody Really Safe" (featuring Project Pat) (produced with Oh Ross)
- 15. "Keep On" (featuring OJ da Juiceman) (produced with Oh Ross and Crazy Mike)
- 18. "Can't Be True" (produced with Hitkidd)
- 20. "S/O to the M" (featuring JP On Tha Track) (produced with JP On Tha Track)

=== Juicy J and Endea Owens - Caught Up In This Illusion ===
- All tracks (produced with Endea Owens)
  - 11. "Please, Stop The Violence In Hip-Hop" (featuring Black Thought) (produced with JR Swiftz and Stanley Randolph)

=== Ty Dolla $ign – TYCOON ===
- 02. "DON'T KILL THE PARTY" (featuring Quavo) (produced with BNYX®, 206Derek, Matt Spatola, Lasik, BBYKOBE and Kanye West)

=== Diplo – d00mscrvll, Vol. 1 ===
- 01. "Flashlight" (featuring Project Pat and Juicy J) (produced with Diplo and MAKJ)
- 04. "Trippy Mane" (featuring Project Pat) (produced with Diplo, Daniel Etienne, MAKJ and Boaz van de Beatz)
- 06. "Gang Activity" (featuring Kordhell and Project Pat) (produced with Diplo, Kordhell and NITTI)
- 08. "Still Get Like That" (featuring Project Pat and Starrah) (produced with Diplo, MAKJ, Daniel Etienne and Jorge)
- 09. "PSYCHWARD" (featuring WesGhost and Project Pat) (produced with Diplo and Hosu joon)

=== Kennedy Ryon, Juicy J and Swanky ===
- "Water Your Grass" (produced with Swanky)

== 2026 ==
=== Diplo – d00mscrvll ===
- 03. "Skittles" (featuring Juicy J and Project Pat) (produced with Diplo, Daniel Etienne and MAKJ)

=== Wiz Khalifa – Moses the Black Soundtrack ===
- 03. "Playa Flava"

=== Juicy J and DJ Scream – The Trippy Tapes Vol. 1 ===
- 02. "Cold Game" (produced with Lex Luger and T Major)
- 04. "Betta Not" (featuring G9ngsta B9by)
- 11. "Backshots" (produced with T Major and Tayo)
- 23. "You Not That" (produced with Mikey Swift)
- 28. "Like This"
- 29. "Sneaky" (featuring rjtheweirdo) (produced with rjtheweirdo)
- 31. "Power" (featuring La Reezy)

=== T.I. – Kill the King ===
- 18. "Confidential"

== See also ==
- DJ Paul production discography
