= DJ Paul production discography =

The following list is a discography of production by DJ Paul, an American hip-hop record producer and recording artist from Memphis, Tennessee. It includes a list of songs produced, co-produced and remixed by year, artist, album and title.

== Albums produced ==
List of albums produced or co-produced by DJ Paul
| Album | Year | Artist |
|---|---|---|
| Smoked Out, Loced Out | 1994 | Three 6 Mafia |
| Mystic Stylez | 1995 | Three 6 Mafia |
| King Of Da Playaz Ball | 1996 | Kingpin Skinny Pimp |
| Can It Be | 1996 | Gangsta Blac |
| Chapter 1: The End | 1996 | Three 6 Mafia |
| Chapter 2: World Domination | 1997 | Three 6 Mafia |
| Body Parts | 1998 | Prophet Posse |
| Angel Dust | 1998 | Indo G |
| Kamakazie Timez Up | 1998 | The Kaze |
| Enquiring Minds | 1998 | Gangsta Boo |
| CrazyNDaLazDayz | 1999 | Tear da Club Up Thugs |
| Underground Vol. 1: 1991–1994 | 1999 | Three 6 Mafia |
| Underground Vol. 2: Club Memphis | 1999 | Three 6 Mafia |
| Da Devil's Playground: Underground Solo | 1999 | Koopsta Knicca |
| Three 6 Mafia Presents: Hypnotize Camp Posse | 2000 | Three 6 Mafia |
| When the Smoke Clears: Sixty 6, Sixty 1 | 2000 | Three 6 Mafia |
| Underground Vol. 3: Kings of Memphis | 2000 | Three 6 Mafia |
| Mista Don't Play: Everythangs Workin | 2001 | Project Pat |
| Both Worlds *69 | 2001 | Gangsta Boo |
| Choices: The Album | 2001 | Three 6 Mafia |
| Murder She Spoke | 2001 | La Chat |
| Underground Volume 16: For da Summa | 2002 | DJ Paul |
| Layin da Smack Down | 2002 | Project Pat |
| Doubt Me Now | 2003 | Lil Wyte |
| Gone on That Bay | 2003 | Frayser Boy |
| Da Unbreakables | 2003 | Three 6 Mafia |
| Phinally Phamous | 2004 | Lil Wyte |
| Choices II: The Setup | 2005 | Three 6 Mafia |
| Most Known Unknown | 2005 | Three 6 Mafia |
| On My Own | 2006 | Crunchy Black |
| Crook by da Book: The Fed Story | 2006 | Project Pat |
| The One and Only | 2007 | Lil Wyte |
| From Me to You | 2007 | Crunchy Black |
| Walkin' Bank Roll | 2007 | Project Pat |
| Last 2 Walk | 2008 | Three 6 Mafia |
| Real Recognize Real | 2009 | Project Pat |
| Scale-A-Ton | 2009 | DJ Paul |
| The Bad Influence | 2009 | Lil Wyte |
| Year Round | 2011 | SNO (Lil Wyte, Jelly Roll, and BPZ) |
| Loud Pack | 2011 | Project Pat |
| A Person of Interest | 2012 | DJ Paul |
| Black Fall | 2013 | Yelawolf and DJ Paul |
| 6ix Commandments | 2013 | Da Mafia 6ix |
| Hear Sum Evil | 2014 | Da Mafia 6ix |
| Watch What U Wish... | 2015 | Da Mafia 6ix |
| Slumafia | 2021 | Yelawolf and DJ Paul |

== 1994 ==
=== Triple 6 Mafia – Smoked Out, Loced Out ===
- All tracks (produced with Juicy J)

== 1995 ==
=== Three 6 Mafia – Mystic Stylez ===
- All tracks (produced with Juicy J)

== 1996 ==
=== Kingpin Skinny Pimp – King Of Da Playaz Ball ===
- All tracks (produced with Juicy J)

=== Kingpin Skinny Pimp – Skinny But Dangerous ===
- 02. "Give Me Sum" (produced with Juicy J and Lil' Pat)
- 04. "Drop It Off" (produced with Juicy J and Lil' Pat)
- 06. "Don't Fuck With Me" (produced with Juicy J and Lil' Pat)
- 10–11. (produced with Juicy J and Lil' Pat)
- 12–16. (produced with Kingpin Skinny Pimp)

=== Gangsta Blac – Can It Be ===
- All tracks (produced with Juicy J)

=== Three 6 Mafia – Chapter 1: The End ===
- All tracks (produced with Juicy J)

== 1997 ==
=== Three 6 Mafia – Chapter 2: World Domination ===
- All tracks (produced with Juicy J)

== 1998 ==
=== Prophet Posse – Body Parts ===
- All tracks (produced with Juicy J)

=== Indo G – Angel Dust ===
- All Tracks (produced with Juicy J)

=== The Kaze – Kamakazie Timez Up ===
- All tracks (produced with Juicy J)

=== Gangsta Boo – Enquiring Minds ===
- All tracks (produced with Juicy J)

== 1999 ==
=== Various Artists - Whiteboys (soundtrack) ===
- 09. "Wanna Be's" (Three 6 Mafia & Project Pat)(produced with Juicy J)

=== Project Pat – Ghetty Green ===
- All Tracks (produced with Juicy J except track 12, produced by Mannie Fresh.)

=== Tear Da Club Up Thugs – CrazyNDaLazDayz ===
- All Tracks (produced with Juicy J)
- 14. "Hypnotize Cash Money" _{(produced with Juicy J and Mannie Fresh)}

=== Koopsta Knicca - Da Devil's Playground: Underground Solo ===
- All Tracks(produced with Juicy J)

== 2000 ==
=== Hypnotize Camp Posse – Three 6 Mafia Presents: Hypnotize Camp Posse ===
- All Tracks (produced with Juicy J) except "Big Mouth, Big Talk"

=== Three 6 Mafia – When the Smoke Clears: Sixty 6, Sixty 1 ===
- All tracks (produced with Juicy J)

=== Triple Six Mafia – Kings Of Memphis Underground Vol. 3 ===
- All Tracks (produced with Juicy J)

=== Funkmaster Flex – 60 Minutes Of Funk, Volume IV: The Mixtape ===
- 22. "Break Da Law 2001" (Project Pat and Three 6 Mafia) (produced with Juicy J)

== 2001 ==
=== Project Pat – Mista Don't Play: Everythangs Workin ===
- All Tracks (produced with Juicy J)

=== Various Artists - Baby Boy ===
- 5. "Baby Mama"(Three 6 Mafia feat. La Chat)(produced with Juicy J)

=== Gangsta Boo – Both Worlds *69 ===
- All tracks (produced with Juicy J)

=== La Chat – Murder She Spoke ===
- All Tracks (produced with Juicy J)

=== Three 6 Mafia – Choices: The Album ===
- All Tracks (produced with Juicy J)

== 2002 ==
=== DJ Paul – Underground Volume 16: For da Summa ===
- All tracks (produced with Juicy J)

=== Juicy J - Chronicles Of The Juice Man ===
- All tracks (produced with Juicy J)

=== Project Pat – Layin' da Smack Down ===
- All Tracks (produced with Juicy J)

=== Da Headbussaz – Dat's How It Happen to'M ===
- All tracks _{(produced with Juicy J except track 10, produced by Fiend.)}

== 2003 ==
=== Lil Wyte – Doubt Me Now ===
- All tracks (produced with Juicy J)

=== Frayser Boy – Gone on That Bay ===
- All tracks (produced with Juicy J)

=== Project Pat – Mix Tape: The Appeal ===
- All Tracks (produced with Juicy J)

=== Three 6 Mafia – Da Unbreakables ===
- All tracks (produced with Juicy J)
  - 12. "Rainbow Colors"(feat. Lil' Flip)(produced with Juicy J and David Banner)

=== Ludacris – Chicken-n-Beer ===
- 7. "Diamond in the Back" (produced with Juicy J)
- 16. "We Got" (featuring Chingy, I-20 and 2 Chainz) (produced with Juicy J)

== 2004 ==
=== Goodie Mob – One Monkey Don't Stop No Show ===
- 3. "123 Goodie" (produced with Juicy J)

=== Young Buck – Straight Outta Cashville ===
- 12. "Stomp" (featuring T.I. and Ludacris) (produced with Juicy J)
- 13. "Taking Hits" (featuring D-Tay) (produced with Juicy J)

=== I-20 – Self Explanatory ===
- 8. "Hennessey & Hydro" (featuring Three 6 Mafia) (produced with Juicy J)

=== DJ Kay Slay - The Streetsweeper, Vol.2: The Pain From The Game ===
- 13. "Who Gives A Fuck Where You From"(featuring Three 6 Mafia, Frayser Boy, and Lil Wyte) (produced with Juicy J)

=== Lil Wyte – Phinally Phamous ===
- All tracks (produced with Juicy J)

== 2005 ==
=== Three 6 Mafia – Choices II: The Setup ===
- All tracks (produced with Juicy J)
  - 6. "It's Whateva Wit Us"(featuring D-Roc and YoungBloodZ)(produced with Juicy J and Lil Jon)

=== Webbie - Savage Life ===
- 9. "I Got That"(featuring Lil Boosie) (produced with Juicy J)

=== Frayser Boy - Me Being Me ===
- All tracks (produced with Juicy J)

=== Three 6 Mafia – Most Known Unknown ===
- All tracks (produced with Juicy J)
  - 10. "Half on a Sack"(produced with Juicy J and David Banner)
  - 18. "Got It 4 Sale"(feat. Chrome)(produced with Juicy J and Mr. Collipark)

=== Mike Jones – Who Is Mike Jones? ===
- 5. "Got It Sewed Up" (Remix) (produced with Juicy J)

=== Paul Wall – The Peoples Champ ===
- 1. "I'm a Playa" (featuring Three 6 Mafia) (produced with Juicy J)

=== Chrome - Straight to the Pros ===
- All Tracks (produced with Juicy J)

== 2006 ==
=== DJ Kay Slay and Greg Street – The Champions: North Meets South ===
- 7. "Hood Drug Warz" (featuring B.G., Lil Wyte and Three 6 Mafia) (produced with Juicy J)

=== Blak Jak – Roll Da Dice ===
- "Get Right Or Get Left" (produced with Juicy J)

=== Crunchy Black – On My Own ===
- All tracks (produced with Juicy J)

=== Lil Scrappy – Bred 2 Die, Born 2 Live ===
- 7. "Posted in the Club" (featuring Three 6 Mafia) (produced with Juicy J)

=== Chingy -Hoodstar ===
- 3. "Club Gettin' Crowded"(featuring Three 6 Mafia) (produced with Juicy J)

=== Young Jeezy - Thug Motivation 102: The Inspiration ===
- 18. "Hood Rat"(feat. Three 6 Mafia and Project Pat) (produced with Juicy J)

=== Project Pat – Crook by da Book: The Fed Story ===
- All tracks (produced with Juicy J)

== 2007 ==
=== Lil' Flip – I Need Mine ===
- 15. "I Just Wanna Tell U" (produced with Juicy J)
- 28. "3, 2, 1, Go!" (featuring Three 6 Mafia) (produced with Juicy J)

=== Lil Wyte – The One and Only ===
- All tracks (produced with Juicy J)

=== Crunchy Black – From Me to You ===
- All tracks (produced with Juicy J)

=== UGK – Underground Kingz ===
- 2. "Int'l Players Anthem (I Choose You)" (featuring OutKast) (produced with Juicy J)

=== Project Pat – Walkin' Bank Roll ===
- All tracks (produced with Juicy J)

== 2008 ==
=== Frayser Boy - Da Key ===
- All Tracks(produced with Juicy J)

=== Three 6 Mafia – Last 2 Walk ===
- All tracks (produced with Juicy J)
  - 6. "I'd Rather" (featuring Unk) (produced with DJ Montay)
  - 7. "That's Right" (featuring Akon) (produced with Akon and Giorgio Tuinfort)
  - 16. "My Own Way" (featuring Good Charlotte) _{(produced with Dead Executives)}
  - 21. "Lolli Lolli (Pop That Body)" (featuring Project Pat, Superpower & Young D) _{(produced with Superpower)}
  - 22. "My Own Way (Remix)" (featuring Good Charlotte) _{(produced with Dead Executives)}

== 2009 ==
=== Project Pat – Real Recognize Real ===
- All tracks (produced with Juicy J)

=== DJ Paul – Scale-A-Ton ===
- All tracks

=== Lil Wyte – The Bad Influence ===
- All tracks (produced with Juicy J)

=== Freddie Gibbs – Midwestgangstaboxframecadillacmuzik ===
- 15. "Just Tryin' ta Make It" (produced with Juicy J)

=== Lil B – 6 Kiss ===
- 22. "Smoke Trees Fxxx Hoes" (produced with Juicy J)

== 2011 ==
=== SNO – Year Round ===
- All tracks (produced with Juicy J)

=== Project Pat – Loud Pack ===
- All tracks (produced with Juicy J)

== 2012 ==
=== Future- Pluto ===
- 6. I'm Trippin'(feat. Juicy J) (produced with Juicy J)

=== Lil B – God's Father ===
- 8. "Keep It 100" (produced with Juicy J)

=== DJ Paul – For I Have Sinned ===
- 5. "Buck Nah" (Remix)
- 6. "Cocky" (featuring 2 Chainz) _{(produced with JGrxxn and Crazy Mike)}
- 7. "Da Money"
- 8. "G'ed Up" _{(produced with Crazy Mike)}
- 9. "Hoe That Wouldn't Go"
- 12. "Skull" _{(produced with JGrxxn and Crazy Mike)}
- 13. "Wildin" (featuring Kokoe)
- 14. "WTF R Those"
- 17. "Put That on my Hood" _{(produced with JGrxxn and Crazy Mike)}
- 19. "Go and Kill" (featuring Insane Clown Posse)
- 22. "Smokin and Fuckin" _{(produced with JGrxxn and Crazy Mike)}

=== Ya Boy – Trappy Birthday ===
- 6. "Rich Nigga Shit" (featuring Three 6 Mafia)

=== DJ Paul – A Person of Interest ===
- All tracks
  - 2. "I'm Dat Raw" _{(produced with Shawty Trap)}
  - 3. "I Can't Take It" (featuring DJ Kay Slay) _{(produced with Shawty Trap)}
  - 4. "Trap Back Jumpin'" _{(produced with Dream Drumz)}
  - 5. "If I Want 2" _{(produced with Shawty Trap)}
  - 6. "Get 'em Done" _{(produced with Shawty Trap)}
  - 7. "Amnesia" _{(produced with Shawty Trap)}
  - 8. "Had ta Eat" (featuring Aaron Williams)
  - 9. "All in da Family" _{(produced with Young Preach)}
  - 10. "Chin Up" _{(produced with Dream Drumz)}
  - 11. "Zeros & Commas" _{(produced with Gtown Vega)}
  - 12. "Burn" _{(produced with Dream Drumz)}
  - 13. "W.I.L.L." (featuring Gucci Mane) _{(produced with Dream Drumz)}
  - 14. "Which One" _{(produced with Gtown Vega)}
  - 15. "E&J" (featuring Locodunit) _{(produced with Shawty Trap)}
  - 16. "Shut 'em Down" _{(produced with Shawty Trap)}
  - 17. "No Panties" _{(produced with Gtown Vega)}
  - 18. "Witha Shit" (featuring Locodunit) _{(produced with Shawty Trap and Premo D'Anger)}
  - 19. "I'm There" _{(produced with JGrxxn)}
  - 20. "Leggo" _{(produced with Shawty Trap)}
  - 21. "In My Zone" _{(produced with JGrxxn and Premo D'Anger)}
  - 22. "I'm Sprung" (featuring Lil Wyte) _{(produced with Dream Drumz)}
  - 23. "My Best (My Pimpin)" _{(produced with JGrxxn and Premo D'Anger)}
  - 24. "Brand New" _{(produced with Shawty Trap)}
  - 27. "Re-Up" (featuring Project Pat) _{(produced with Dream Drumz)}
  - 28. "King Shit" _{(produced with Shawty Trap)}

== 2013 ==
=== Ying Yang Twins – Twurk or Die ===
- 1. "Twurk or Die" (featuring Tone Bone)

=== DJ Paul and Drumma Boy – Clash of the Titans ===
- 4. "Muscle So Strong" (featuring Crunchy Black) _{(produced with Shawty Trap)}
- 7. "In and Out" (featuring Young Dolph) _{(produced with Shawty Trap)}
- 8. "Jump On Niggaz" (featuring Trae tha Truth) _{(produced with Shawty Trap)}
- 10. "Hard Shit" (featuring Lil Wyte)
- 12. "No If Ands Or Buts (Feat. Baby D, Young Snead & Kokoe) _{(produced with Dream Drumz)}
- 14. "Million Dollars Richer" _{(produced with TWhy Xclusive)}
- 16. "In Da Trap" (featuring Gorilla Zoe) _{(produced with Shawty Trap)}
- 17. "Jus Becuz" (featuring MaxxPayne Shawty) _{(produced with Dream Drumz)}
- 18. "Tappin Out" (featuring Gangsta Boo) _{(produced with Dream Drumz)}

=== Yelawolf and DJ Paul – Black Fall ===
- All tracks _{(tracks 1–4 produced with TWhy Xclusive)}

=== Da Mafia 6ix – 6ix Commandments ===
- All tracks
  - 4. "Been Had Hard" _{(produced with TWhy Xclusive and JGrxxn)}
  - 5. "Betta Pray" (featuring The Outlawz and Lil Wyte) _{(produced with TWhy Xclusive)}
  - 7. "Murder On My Mind" (featuring SpaceGhostPurrp, Krayzie Bone, and Bizzy Bone) _{(produced with SpaceGhostPurrp and JGrxxn)}
  - 10. "Yean High" (featuring 8Ball & MJG) _{(produced with TWhy Xclusive and JGrxxn)}

== 2014 ==
=== 2 Chainz – FreeBase ===
- 4. "Flexin on My Baby Mama" _{(produced with TWhy Xclusive)}

=== Killjoy Club – Reindeer Games ===
(Tracks produced with TWhy Xclusive and FNA)

- 2. "Don't Fuck Wit Me" (featuring Sugar Slam)
- 4. "Jump" (featuring Young Wicked and Sugar Slam)
- 6. "Hammer Time" (featuring Young Wicked)
- 8. "It's a Murder It's a Kill" (featuring Young Wicked)
- 10. "Devil Made Me Do It" (featuring Big Hoodoo)
- 12. "Braver Than Me" (featuring Young Wicked)
- 14. "Live to Kill U"
- 16. "Outro"

=== Da Mafia 6ix – Hear Sum Evil ===
- All tracks
  - 2. "Who Want Sum Conflict" (featuring La Chat, YB The Rich Rocka and Locodunit) _{(produced with TWhy Xclusive and 808 Mafia)}
  - 4. "Too Petty" (featuring Fiend, La Chat and Lil Wyte) _{(produced with TWhy Xclusive and JGrxxn)}
  - 7. "Hydrocodone" (featuring Paul Wall and Charlie P) _{(produced with TWhy Xclusive and JGrxxn)}
  - 8. "Active" (featuring Fiend and La Chat) _{(produced with TWhy Xclusive)}
  - 11. "Payin' Top Dolla" (featuring Fiend and La Chat) _{(produced with TWhy Xclusive and The Outvaderz)}

== 2015 ==
=== Da Mafia 6ix – Watch What U Wish... ===
- All tracks
  - 2. "Dat Ain't Inya" (featuring La Chat & Fiend) _{(produced with 808 Mafia)}
  - 3. "50 Bands" (featuring Lord Infamous) _{(produced with TWhy Xclusive)}
  - 6. "Why Must I Sweat Da Track" (featuring Fiend) _{(produced with TWhy Xclusive)}
  - 10. "No Good Deed" (featuring La Chat) _{(produced with Hot Rod)}
  - 11. "Back On Dat Hype" (featuring Lord Infamous) _{(produced with TWhy Xclusive)}
  - 12. "Do Dabs" (featuring Mariah Jane) _{(produced with TWhy Xclusive)}
  - 15. "High Like An Eagle" (featuring Lord Infamous, La Chat & Fiend) _{(produced with TWhy Xclusive)}
  - 17. "We Be Goin' In" (featuring Lord Infamous) _{(produced with TWhy Xclusive)}

=== DJ Paul – Master of Evil ===
- All tracks
  - 2. "Down Bad" _{(produced with TWhy Xclusive)}
  - 3. "I'm Just Sayin" _{(produced with TWhy Xclusive)}
  - 5. "Dats It Fa Ya" (featuring Juicy J) _{(produced with TWhy Xclusive)}
  - 7. "Play Witcha Life" _{(produced with TWhy Xclusive)}
  - 8. "Goin in & Out" _{(produced with TWhy Xclusive)}
  - 9. "She Rocks Dat" _{(produced with TWhy Xclusive)}
  - 13. "Lay Down Today" _{(produced with TWhy Xclusive)}
  - 14. "F U 2" (featuring Violent J and Yelawolf) _{(produced with TWhy Xclusive)}
  - 17. "Shut It Down" _{(produced with TWhy Xclusive)}
  - 18. "My Price is My Price" _{(produced with TWhy Xclusive)}
  - 19. "Loud Loud" (featuring Lil Wyte) _{(produced with TWhy Xclusive)}

== 2016 ==
=== 2 Chainz – Hibachi for Lunch ===
- 6. "Doors Open" (featuring Future) _{(produced with TWhy Xclusive)}

== 2017 ==
=== Riff Raff – Aquaberry Aquarius ===
- 9. "Jody Highroller Dot Com" (featuring Choo Johnson)

== 2018 ==
=== Drake – Scorpion ===
- 11. "Talk Up" (featuring Jay-Z) _{(produced with TWhy Xclusive)}

== 2019 ==
=== Giggs – Big Bad ===
- 12. "Hold Up" (featuring French Montana) _{(produced with TWhy Xclusive)}

=== Yelawolf – Trunk Muzik 3 ===
- 3. "Rowdy" (featuring Machine Gun Kelly & DJ Paul)
- 7. "Trailer Park Hollywood"
- 10. "Box Chevy 6" (featuring Rittz & DJ Paul)

=== Riff Raff – Cranberry Vampire ===
- 8. "Floor Seats" (featuring Chief Keef and DJ Paul)

=== Trippie Redd - A Love Letter to You 4 ===
- 14. "Death" (featuring DaBaby) _{(produced with TWhy Xclusive)}

== 2020 ==
=== Rob Vicious – Breakthrough ===
- 1. "L3V3L"

=== Duke Deuce – Memphis Massacre 2 ===
- 3. "Crunk Ain't Dead [Remix]" (featuring Project Pat, Lil Jon, and Juicy J) _{(produced with Juicy J)}

=== Lil Baby – My Turn ===
- 17. "Gang Signs" _{(produced with TWhy Xclusive)}

=== Dave East – Karma 3 ===
- 10. "Fuck Dat" (featuring Young Dolph)

== 2021 ==
=== Yelawolf and DJ Paul – Slumafia ===
- All tracks _{(produced with TWhy Xclusive)}

=== Chief Keef – 4NEM ===
_{(Tracks} _{produced with Juicy J)}

- 5. "Like It's Yo Job"
- 13. "Hadouken"

== 2022 ==
=== The Game – Drillmatic – Heart vs. Mind ===
- 6. "O.P.P." (featuring YoungBoy Never Broke Again) _{(produced with TWhy Xclusive)}
- 8. "La La Land"

=== Freddie Gibbs – Soul Sold Separately ===
- 10. "PYS" (featuring DJ Paul)

=== Duke Deuce - Memphis Massacre III ===
- 4. "What You Rep" (with DJ Paul) _{(produced with TWhy Xclusive)}

== 2023 ==
=== NLE Choppa - Cottonwood 2 ===
- 16. "Stomp Em Out" (with Duke Deuce) _{(produced with Chilbu and TWhy Xclusive)}

=== Sexyy Red - Hood Hottest Princess ===
- 6. "Sexyy Walk" _{(produced with Juicy J)}

=== Killer Mike - Michael ===
- 5. "Talk'n That Shit!" _{(produced with TWhy Xclusive)}
- 7. "Scientists & Engineers" (with André 3000 featuring Future and Eryn Allen Kane) _{(produced with André 3000, James Blake, No I.D., and TWhy Xclusive)}
