= Choices: The Movie =

2001 film directed by Gil Green

Film poster for Choices: The Movie

Choices: The Movie is a drama film directed and produced by Gil Green released on November 6, 2001. The film stars Isley Nicole Melton as well as Hypnotize Minds artists DJ Paul, Juicy J, Project Pat, and La Chat. Its plot concerns a recently released ex-con struggling to stay on the right track. The movie would be followed in 2005 by a sequel titled Choices II: The Setup.

== See also ==
- Choices: The Album
