= Prophet's Greatest Hits =

Greatest hits album by Three 6 Mafia
- Released: February 6, 2007 (U.S.)
- Recorded: 1994–1999
- Genre: Southern rap Gangsta rap Crunk; Chopped and screwed Pop rap
- Length: 2:19:46
- Label: Prophet Entertainment; Hypnotize Minds
- Producer: DJ Paul and Juicy J

Three 6 Mafia chronology
Smoked Out Music Greatest Hits (2007)	Prophet's Greatest Hits (2007)	Last 2 Walk (2008)

Prophet's Greatest Hits is a collection of hit songs by Three 6 Mafia during the early Prophet Entertainment years. The album charted at #82 on the US Top R&B/Hip-Hop Albums (Billboard) on February 24, 2007.

== Track listing ==
Disc 1

1. Let's Ride Nigga - 4:40
2. Da Summa - 4:41
3. Gettem' Crunk - 4:23
4. Throw Yo Sets In Da Air - 5:20
5. Smoked Out, Loced Out (Pt. 3) - 4:46
6. Gotta Touch 'Em (Pt. 2) - 4:53
7. Late Nite Tip - 5:16
8. Triple Six Clubhouse - 2:43
9. Tear Da Club Up (Da Real) - 4:33
10. Where's Da Bud - 3:53
11. 'Bout The South (featuring Project Pat, The Dayton Family) - 4:26
12. Porno Movie - 5:24
13. Good Stuff - 4:16
14. Funkytown - 5:00

Disc 2

1. DJ Black Intro - 1:14
2. Where's Da Bud - 4:57
3. Smoked Out, Loced Out - 6:00
4. Gotta Touch 'Em (Pt. 2) - 6:01
5. Da Summa - 5:30
6. DJ Black Interlude - 0:51
7. Throw Yo Sets In Da Air - 6:49
8. Funkytown - 5:54
9. Good Stuff - 6:20
10. Porno Movie - 4:37
11. DJ Black Interlude - 0:18
12. Late Night Tip - 6:24
13. Triple Six Clubhouse - 2:00
14. Tear Da Club Up - 6:25
15. Let's Ride Nigga - 4:48
16. Get 'Em Crunk - 3:33
17. DJ Black Outro - 0:48
18. Bout the South - 3:03

== Charts ==
Chart (2007)	Peak position
US Top R&B/Hip-Hop Albums (Billboard)	82
