= M.O.B. (Project Pat album) =

Studio album by Project Pat
- Released: September 8, 2017
- Genre: Southern hip-hop; gangsta rap
- Length: 44:47
- Label: X-Ray
- Producer: XTC Beats

Project Pat chronology
| Mista Don't Play 2 Everythangs Money (2015) | M.O.B. (2017) |

Singles from M.O.B.
- 1. "Money" Released: September 5, 2017

Professional ratings
Review scores
| Source | Rating |
|---|---|
| RapReviews | (5/10) |

M.O.B. is the ninth studio album by American rapper Project Pat. It was released on September 8, 2017, by X-Ray Records. It features guest appearances from Juicy J and Young Dolph. The album was supported by its lead single "Money", which was produced by XTC Beats and released on September 5, 2017.

== Track listing ==
| No. | Title | Length |
|---|---|---|
| 1. | "Pockets Hurtin'" | 3:37 |
| 2. | "Slangin' Butta" | 3:20 |
| 3. | "Wit the Shii" | 3:19 |
| 4. | "Extortion Game" | 3:52 |
| 5. | "A Real One Will" | 3:30 |
| 6. | "We Dem Ones" | 4:53 |
| 7. | "Very Paranoid" | 3:31 |
| 8. | "M.O.B." | 3:32 |
| 9. | "Ain't No Passes" | 4:10 |
| 10. | "Lit 'Em Up" | 3:30 |
| 11. | "O's" (featuring Young Dolph) | 4:12 |
| 12. | "Money" (featuring Juicy J) | 3:21 |
| Total length: | | 44:47 |
