= Smoked Out Music: Greatest Hits =

Greatest hits album by Three 6 Mafia
- Released: October 3, 2006
- Recorded: 1991–2005
- Genre: Southern hip-hop; gangsta rap; crunk; hardcore hip-hop
- Length: 56:52
- Label: Hypnotize Minds
- Producer: DJ Paul; Juicy J

Smoked Out Music: Greatest Hits is a compilation album by hip-hop group Three 6 Mafia. The album features tracks that span the full history of the group up until the album's release. The first track on the album, "When It's On, It's Murder", is a previously unreleased song, while the rest are lifted from previous album releases.

The album also contains a bonus second disc that features a mix of 15 untitled tracks that are "dragged-n-chopped" by DJ Black.

== Track listing ==
=== Main disc ===
- All tracks are produced by DJ Paul and Juicy J

No.	Title	Length
1.	"When It's On, It's Murder"	3:03
2.	"Break Da Law"	5:14
3.	"Where's Da Bud Part 2"	5:34
4.	"Love to Make a Stang"	3:38
5.	"Grab Da Gauge"	5:25
6.	"Jealous Ass Bitch"	4:18
7.	"Liquor & Bud"	4:44
8.	"Nine to Yo Dome"	3:31
9.	"Ridin' N The Chevy"	6:02
10.	"Playa Hataz"	3:38
11.	"Half On a Sack or Blow"	3:39
12.	"Now I'm High, Really High"	4:20
13.	"Gimme Head"	3:45
Total length:		56:52

=== Bonus disc ===
- All tracks are dragged-n-chopped by DJ Black

No.	Title	Length
1.	"Where Is Da Bud Part 2 [Dragged & Chopped]"	6:48
2.	"Ridin N The Chevy [Dragged & Chopped]"	6:07
3.	"Jealous Ass Bitch [Dragged & Chopped]"	5:35
4.	"Love To Make A Stang [Dragged & Chopped]"	4:29
5.	"Liquor And Bud [DJ Paul & Lord Infamous] [Dragged & Chopped]"	3:41
6.	"Half On A Sack Or Blow [Mack E] [Dragged & Chopped]"	4:07
7.	"Nine To Yo Dome [Project Pat] [Dragged & Chopped]"	4:33
8.	"Grab Tha Gauge [Dragged & Chopped]"	4:28
9.	"Playa Hataz [Dragged & Chopped]"	4:10
10.	"When It's On, It's Murder (Da Song) [Dragged & Chopped]"	3:19
11.	"Interlude [Dragged & Chopped]"	0:21
12.	"Break Da Law [DJ Paul & Frayser Boy] [Dragged & Chopped]"	6:22
13.	"Gimme Head [Juicy J, Frayser Boy & La' Chat] [Dragged & Chopped]"	3:34
14.	"Interlude [Dragged & Chopped]"	0:45
15.	"Now I'm High, Really High [Lord Infamous & Koopsta Knicca] [Dragged & Chopped]"	6:06
Total length:		64:24

== Charts ==
Chart (2000)	Peak position
US Top R&B/Hip-Hop Albums (Billboard)	48
US Top Rap Albums (Billboard)	22
US Independent Albums (Billboard)	21
