= Hypnotize Camp Posse (album) =

Three 6 Mafia Presents: Hypnotize Camp Posse

Studio album by Hypnotize Camp Posse
- Released: January 25, 2000
- Recorded: 1999–2000
- Genre: Gangsta rap; hardcore hip-hop; Southern hip-hop
- Length: 68:18
- Label: Hypnotize Minds; Loud; RED
- Producer: DJ Paul; Juicy J

Professional ratings
Review scores
| Source | Rating |
|---|---|
| AllMusic | 2.5/5 stars |

Hypnotize Camp Posse is the only studio album by American hip-hop group the Hypnotize Camp Posse, a collaboration between Three 6 Mafia and members of its label, Hypnotize Minds. The Hypnotize Camp Posse group is essentially a larger or "broader" form of Three 6 Mafia, as it includes all the members of Three 6 Mafia as well as all the artists signed to Hypnotize Minds. All the artists featured on the album were Hypnotize Minds artists with the exception of guest artist Pastor Troy, a member of the Atlanta-based group D.S.G.B. (Down South Georgia Boys). The album was released by Loud Records and Hypnotize Minds on January 25, 2000, and distributed through RED Distribution.

On February 12, 2000, the album debuted at #1 on the US Billboard Independent Albums chart.

== Track listing ==
- All tracks are produced by DJ Paul and Juicy J

| No. | Title | Lyrics | Length |
|---|---|---|---|
| 1. | "Rinky Dink Records" (Skit) | | 0:52 |
| 2. | "We 'Bout to Ride" | DJ Paul; Juicy J; Project Pat; Koopsta Knicca; Crunchy Black; Lord Infamous; La Chat; T-Rock; Lil E (Eric Gales) | 5:55 |
| 3. | "Drive By" | Project Pat | 3:35 |
| 4. | "Azz & Tittiez" | DJ Paul; Juicy J; La Chat; Mr. Del | 5:34 |
| 5. | "Die a Soldier" | DJ Paul; Lord Infamous; La Chat; Project Pat; T-Rock; Crunchy Black; Gangsta Boo; M.C. Mack; Scan Man | 5:28 |
| 6. | "We Ain't Playin'" | Gangsta Boo; Project Pat; Koopsta Knicca | 4:08 |
| 7. | "Fie It on Up" | T-Rock; Lord Infamous; DJ Paul; Juicy J | 4:18 |
| 8. | "Big Mouth, Big Talk" (featuring Pastor Troy) | Pastor Troy; T-Rock | 3:56 |
| 9. | "What's Going On" (Skit) | | 0:54 |
| 10. | "Dick Suckin' Hoes" | Gangsta Boo; DJ Paul; Juicy J | 4:25 |
| 11. | "Don't Make Me Kill" | DJ Paul; Lord Infamous; Juicy J; Project Pat; Scan Man; M.C. Mack | 4:24 |
| 12. | "Don't Trust 'Em" | Crunchy Black; T-Rock | 4:26 |
| 13. | "Who Run It" | DJ Paul; Juicy J; Crunchy Black; Lord Infamous; Gangsta Boo; Koopsta Knicca | 4:44 |
| 14. | "Project Hoes" | Project Pat; T-Rock; La Chat | 3:55 |
| 15. | "Da First Date" | DJ Paul; Juicy J; Lord Infamous; Koopsta Knicca | 5:05 |
| 16. | "Hoes Can Be Like Niggaz" | La Chat | 3:05 |
| 17. | "Outro" (Skit) | | 3:34 |
| Total length: | | | 68:18 |

== Artists ==
All performers featured on the album were members of Hypnotize Camp Posse and signed to Hypnotize Minds when the album was recorded, with the exception of Pastor Troy, who appears as a guest artist on "Big Mouth, Big Talk" and is also credited as a co-producer on eight tracks.

Thirteen members of Hypnotize Camp Posse make lyrical appearances on the album, including all six full members of Three 6 Mafia.

- DJ Paul: performer (8 tracks), producer (all tracks)
- Juicy J: performer (7 tracks), producer (all tracks)
- Lord Infamous: performer (6 tracks)
- Project Pat: performer (6 tracks)
- T-Rock: performer (6 tracks)
- La Chat: performer (5 tracks)
- Crunchy Black: performer (4 tracks)
- Gangsta Boo: performer (4 tracks)
- Koopsta Knicca: performer (4 tracks)
- M.C. Mack: performer (2 tracks)
- Scan Man: performer (2 tracks)
- Lil E (Eric Gales): performer (track 2)
- Mr. Del: performer (track 4)
- Frayser Boy: additional vocals (track 5)

Additionally, "Azz & Tittiez" contains a sample of "Lookin' for Da Chewin'" by Kingpin Skinny Pimp, which had been produced by DJ Zirk and DJ Paul – the latter a member of Three 6 Mafia – and released on April 1, 1996. This sample includes vocals by Kingpin Skinny Pimp, with the lyrics "Say aah, not the thermometer, bitch, it's the nine inches."

== Charts ==
| Chart (2000) | Peak position |
|---|---|
| US Billboard 200 | 36 |
| US Top R&B/Hip-Hop Albums (Billboard) | 11 |
| US Independent Albums (Billboard) | 1 |
