= Body Parts (Prophet Posse album) =

Studio album by Prophet Posse
- Released: February 24, 1998
- Recorded: 1997–1998
- Genres: Gangsta rap; hardcore hip-hop; Southern hip-hop; horrorcore
- Length: 70:35
- Label: Prophet Entertainment
- Producers: DJ Paul; Juicy J

Professional ratings
Review scores
Source	Rating
AllMusic	2/5 stars

Body Parts is the debut studio album by the group Prophet Posse, a collaboration side-project of Three 6 Mafia with members of its then-label, Prophet Entertainment. The Prophet Posse group was known as a larger, "offshoot" version of Three 6 Mafia, as it included each member of Three 6 Mafia as well as all the artists signed to Prophet Entertainment. All the artists featured on the album were Prophet Entertainment artists with the exception of guest act Dayton Family. The album was released on February 24, 1998, by Prophet Entertainment and distributed through S.O.H. Distributors Network.

== Track listing ==
- All tracks are produced by DJ Paul and Juicy J

No.	Title	Lyrics	Length
1.	"Talkin' Shit" (Skit)	Juicy J; DJ Paul	1:36
2.	"Triple Six Club House"	Lord Infamous	2:46
3.	"Murderer, Robber"	Project Pat; Lord Infamous	4:46
4.	"Orange Mound"	M-Child	3:30
5.	"Left'em Dead"	Crunchy Black; DJ Paul; Scan Man; Project Pat	3:58
6.	"Nothin' But Pimp Shit"	Droopy Drew Dog; DJ Paul; K-Rock	3:37
7.	"Bout the South" (featuring Dayton Family)	Dayton Family; Project Pat	4:27
8.	"Turn into Killaz"	DJ Paul; Nigga Creep	3:39
9.	"Notha Nigga Car/Clothes"	Lord Infamous; DJ Paul; Juicy J; Crunchy Black; M.C. Mack; Koopsta Knicca	4:07
10.	"Drinkin' n Thinkin'"	Lord Infamous; Indo G; K-Rock	3:51
11.	"What's Next" (Skit)	Juicy J; DJ Paul	1:38
12.	"Favorite Scary Movie"	Juicy J; Lord Infamous; Koopsta Knicca; DJ Paul	2:14
13.	"Catch a Blast"	T-Rock; M-Child	2:44
14.	"Judgement Night"	Koopsta Knicca; DJ Paul	4:11
15.	"All for One"	Juicy J; Gangsta Boo	3:26
16.	"Smoked Out, Loced Out"	K-Rock; Lord Infamous; Crunchy Black; Gangsta Boo; Juicy J; Project Pat; DJ Paul	4:46
17.	"Bullet with Yo Name On It"	DJ Paul; T-Rock	3:38
18.	"Bitches on My Jock"	DJ Paul; Indo G; Gangsta Boo	4:50
19.	"After Dark"	Juicy J	2:53
20.	"Life in Bondage"	Koopsta Knicca	3:58
Total length:			70:35

== Charts ==
Chart (1998)	Peak position
US Billboard 200	168
US Top R&B/Hip-Hop Albums (Billboard)	54
