= X-Ray Records =

American independent hip hop record label

- Founded: 2000
- Founder: Brian Perera
- Genre: Hip hop, Contemporary R&B
- Country of origin: U.S.
- Location: Los Angeles, California
- Official website: www.cleorecs.com

X-Ray Records is an American independent record label specializing in hip hop music.

== History ==
X-Ray Records is an imprint under the Cleopatra Records, Inc. label group that focuses on hip hop and modern R&B. The imprint began in 2000 just as the label was starting to diversify after predominantly focusing on gothic and industrial music throughout the late ‘90s. It made an auspicious start with SX-10, the hip hop/metal hybrid featuring Sen Dog of Cypress Hill. Releases from KRS-One, Mellow Man Ace, Gravediggaz, Junior M.A.F.I.A. and Westside Connection followed.

The burgeoning imprint achieved a first for the Cleopatra family in 2005 when the album It's Not a Game by Bone-Thugs-N-Harmony member Layzie Bone landed on the Billboard Top 100 chart. That attracted more talent to the roster, including notorious hip hop outlaw DMX, P. Diddy prodigy Loon, Pastor Troy, Coolio, Afroman, and Vanilla Ice.

== Notable artists ==
- 40 Cal.
- Ca$his
- DMX
- Lil Reese
- Project Pat
- Unk
- Onyx
- Philly Swain
- Reggie Mills
- Black Sheep
- Petey Pablo
- Freak Nasty
- Trick Daddy
- Brokencyde
- Lil Scrappy
- Planet Asia
- Camp Lo
- Tragedy Khadafi

== See also ==
- List of record labels
- List of hip hop record labels
