= Mista Don't Play 2: Everythangs Money =

Mista Don't Play 2 Everythangs Money

Studio album by Project Pat
- Released: April 14, 2015
- Recorded: 2013–2015
- Genre: Southern hip-hop; gangsta rap
- Length: 56:23
- Label: eOne
- Producer: Project Pat (exec.); Juicy J (also exec.); Lil Awree; Joe Simpson; Crazy Mike; J Dizzle on the Beat; Mike WiLL Made-It; K.E. on the Track; Deezy

Project Pat chronology
Loud Pack (2011)	Mista Don't Play 2 Everythangs Money (2015)	M.O.B. (2017)

Singles from Mista Don't Play 2 Everythangs Money
- 1. "Twerk It" Released: 2015

Mista Don't Play 2 Everythangs Money is the eighth studio album by American rapper Project Pat from Memphis, Tennessee. It was released on April 14, 2015 via Entertainment One Music. It served as a sequel to his sophomore full-length Mista Don't Play: Everythangs Workin, released in 2001. Production was handled primarily by Pat's younger brother Juicy J, alone with Lil Awree, Joe Simpson, Crazy Mike, J Dizzle on the Beat, Mike Will Made It, K.E. on the Track and Deezy. It features guest appearances from Bankroll Fresh, Doe B, Nasty Mane, Ty Dolla $ign, Wale, Wiz Khalifa and Juicy J. The album peaked at No. 43 on the Top R&B/Hip-Hop Albums chart in the United States, spawning a single "Twerk It".

== Track listing ==
No.	Title	Producer(s)	Length
1.	"Tunnel Vision"	Juicy J; Lil Awree	3:38
2.	"Pull a Move"	Juicy J; Crazy Mike	3:44
3.	"Gooned Up" (featuring Bankroll Fresh)	Juicy J; Lil Awree	3:55
4.	"I Ain't Payem Shit"	Juicy J; Lil Awree	2:48
5.	"Crash Out"	Juicy J; Lil Awree	3:02
6.	"I Like to Smokeaaaa"	Juicy J; Crazy Mike	3:37
7.	"MF U Niggas"	J Dizzle on the Beat	3:55
8.	"Bitch Talking Bad (Skit)" (featuring Tatalalicious)		0:33
9.	"Leave Me Alone" (featuring Joe Simpson)	Joe Simpson	3:52
10.	"Bone Ready (Skit)" (featuring Joe Simpson and King Ray)		1:53
11.	"Twerk It" (featuring Ty Dolla $ign, Wiz Khalifa, and Wale)	Juicy J; Lil Awree; K.E. on the Track	3:47
12.	"Wanna Get High" (featuring Joe Simpson)	Joe Simpson	3:54
13.	"Gucci Skully" (featuring King Ray)	Juicy J; Lil Awree	4:27
14.	"Suspect" (featuring Donvito)	Juicy J; Lil Awree	3:16
15.	"Be a G (Remix)" (featuring Juicy J and Doe B)	Mike WiLL Made-It	4:43
16.	"Trying To Get a Dollar"	Juicy J; Lil Awree	2:43
17.	"Makin Plays"	Juicy J; Lil Awree; Deezy	2:36
Total length:			56:23

== Chart history ==
Chart (2015)	Peak position
US Top R&B/Hip-Hop Albums (Billboard)	43
