= Angel Dust (Indo G album) =

Studio album by Indo G
- Released: August 25, 1998
- Recorded: 1997–1998
- Studio: Cotton Row Recording Studio (Memphis, Tennessee); House Of Blues Studios; Sheldon's Crib
- Genre: Hardcore hip-hop; gangsta rap
- Length: 58:30
- Label: Relativity; Hypnotize Minds; Epic
- Producer: DJ Paul (also exec.); Juicy J (also exec.)

Indo G chronology
| Up in Smoke (1995) | Angel Dust (1998) | Live and Learn (2000) |

Singles from Angel Dust
- 1. "Remember Me Ballin'" Released: February 2, 1999

Professional ratings
Review scores
| Source | Rating |
|---|---|
| AllMusic | 4/5 stars |
| The Source | 3.5/5 stars |

Angel Dust is the debut solo studio album by American rapper Indo G from Memphis, Tennessee. It was released on August 25, 1998 via Relativity Records and Hypnotize Minds. Recording sessions took place at Cotton Row Recording Studio, House of Blues Studios, and Sheldon's Crib, with producers DJ Paul and Juicy J. It features guest appearances from Gangsta Boo, Koopsta Knicca, K-Rock, Lord Infamous, Project Pat and T-Rock among others. The album peaked at number 105 on the Billboard 200 albums chart in the United States, spawning a single "Remember Me Ballin'", which made it to number 17 on the Hot Rap Songs chart.

== Track listing ==
| No. | Title | Length |
|---|---|---|
| 1. | "Da Calendar" | 0:27 |
| 2. | "Ain't No Bitch in My Blood" | 1:38 |
| 3. | "Throw Them Thangs" (featuring Lord Infamous & Gangsta Boo) | 4:52 |
| 4. | "Ashes to Ashes" (featuring Koopsta Knicca, Nick Scarfo & K-Rock) | 3:17 |
| 5. | "Remember Me Ballin'" (featuring Gangsta Boo) | 4:21 |
| 6. | "Break the Law '98" (featuring DJ Paul, Juicy J, & T-Rock) | 4:25 |
| 7. | "Dead Men Don't Talk" (featuring Project Pat & Smokey Jo) | 3:41 |
| 8. | "Fall Up Off Me Ho" (featuring Nick Scarfo) | 4:19 |
| 9. | "Will a Nigga Make It" (featuring Juicy J) | 3:02 |
| 10. | "Big Boy Shit" | 3:30 |
| 11. | "Prophet Hataz" (featuring Gangsta Boo, & K-Rock) | 4:07 |
| 12. | "Ghetto Party" | 2:33 |
| 13. | "My Nigga's Crazy" (featuring DJ Paul & Juicy J) | 3:05 |
| 14. | "Fly Straight" (featuring Three 6 Mafia & Prophet Posse) | 4:22 |
| 15. | "Cleopatra" | 4:27 |
| 16. | "Can You Feel Me" | 4:15 |
| 17. | "Tear da Club Up Thugs" (Intro) | 0:06 |
| 18. | "Fuck What Ya Heard" (featuring Tear Da Club Up Thugs) | 3:03 |
| Total length: | | 58:30 |

== Chart history ==
| Chart (1998) | Peak position |
|---|---|
| US Billboard 200 | 105 |
| US Top R&B/Hip-Hop Albums (Billboard) | 32 |
| US Heatseekers Albums (Billboard) | 2 |
