= Enquiring Minds =

Studio album by Gangsta Boo
- Released: September 29, 1998
- Recorded: 1997–1998
- Studio: Cotton Row (Memphis, Tennessee)
- Genres: Southern hip-hop, Horrorcore
- Length: 74:14
- Labels: Hypnotize Minds; Relativity Records
- Producers: DJ Paul; Juicy J

Gangsta Boo chronology
Enquiring Minds (1998)	Both Worlds *69 (2001)

Singles from Enquiring Minds
- 1. "Where Dem Dollas At" Released: July 14, 1998; 2. "Nasty Trick" Released: December 29, 1998

Professional ratings
Review scores
Source	Rating
AllMusic	3/5 stars
The Source	3/5 stars

Enquiring Minds is the debut solo studio album by American rapper Gangsta Boo. It was released on September 29, 1998, by Hypnotize Minds and Relativity Records. The recording sessions took place at Cotton Row Recording Studio in Memphis. The production was handled by DJ Paul and Juicy J.

== Track listing ==
No.	Title	Length
1.	"Intro" (featuring DJ Paul & Juicy J)	1:10
2.	"Enquiring Minds"	1:28
3.	"Don't Stand So Close" (featuring Tear Da Club Up Thugs)	4:04
4.	"Oh No" (featuring Hussein Fatal & Tear Da Club Up Thugs)	4:14
5.	"Kill, Kill, Kill, Murder, Murder, Murder" (featuring DJ Paul)	2:32
6.	"Suck a Little Dick" (featuring DJ Paul & Juicy J)	3:57
7.	"Fuck You" (featuring M-Child & Koopsta Knicca)	4:42
8.	"Where Dem Dollas At" (featuring DJ Paul & Juicy J)	4:26
9.	"Da One Close, Know Most" (featuring DJ Paul)	1:41
10.	"Wanna Go to War"	3:21
11.	"I'll Be the Other Woman"	4:27
12.	"High Off That Weed" (featuring Juicy J)	3:09
13.	"Be Real" (featuring Crunchy Black)	4:18
14.	"Nasty Trick"	3:33
15.	"Nigga Yeah Know" (featuring T-Rock & Project Pat)	3:00
16.	"Money and the Powder" (featuring DJ Paul)	4:20
17.	"Life in the Metro" (featuring MC Mack & Scanman)	3:47
18.	"This Is Personal" (featuring Project Pat)	3:04
19.	"Only You" (featuring T-Rock)	3:45
20.	"Who We Be?" (featuring Prophet Posse)	5:37
21.	"Where Dem Dollas At" (Bass Mix)	3:39
Total length:		74:14

== Chart history ==
Chart (1998)	Peak position
US Billboard 200	46
US Top R&B/Hip-Hop Albums (Billboard)	15
