= Crook by da Book: The Fed Story =

Studio album by Project Pat
- Released: December 5, 2006
- Recorded: 2005–2006
- Studio: Hypnotize Minds Studio (Memphis, Tennessee)
- Genre: Southern hip-hop; gangsta rap
- Length: 65:37
- Label: Hypnotize Minds; Columbia; Sony Urban
- Producer: DJ Paul; Juicy J

Project Pat chronology
Layin' da Smack Down (2002)	Crook by da Book: The Fed Story (2006)	Walkin' Bank Roll (2007)

Crook by da Book: The Fed Story is the fourth studio album by American rapper Project Pat. It was released on December 5, 2006, via Hypnotize Minds/Sony Urban/Columbia. First rumored to be released August 18, 2006, but was pushed back to December 5, 2006. Recording sessions took place at Hypnotize Minds Studio in Memphis, Tennessee. Production was handled by DJ Paul and Juicy J. The album features guest appearances from Three 6 Mafia, Beanie Sigel, Lyfe Jennings, Pimp C, Mr. Bigg and Young Jeezy. The album debuted at number 64 on the Billboard 200, selling about 40,000 copies in its first week.

== Critical reception ==
Professional ratings
Review scores
Source	Rating
AllMusic	3.5/5 stars
RapReviews	7/10

AllMusic's David Jeffries called the album "a properly financed version of his Ghetty Green LP with beefier beats and more polished production" but noted that its appeal will depend on "the listener's tolerance for his tried-and-true, down-and-dirty formula", concluding that: "[T]he single-minded Crook by da Book might not woo many newcomers toward his hard-thugging corner of the hip-hop world, but Hypnotize Minds fans worried a Oscar would make this family go soft can now exhale." Steve 'Flash' Juon of RapReviews praised Pat for being "a competent narrator and storyteller" that has the main focus on his own album and uses the spotlight effectively for his featured guests, concluding that: "Crook by Da Book: The Fed Story is a study in contradictions, as Pat seems like a rapper who is capable of being more than a fill-in member for Three 6 Mafia but one who is also clearly loyal to his Memphis comrades and vice versa. They are more help than hindrance to his rap career, so this is not at all a bad match; in fact future Three 6 Mafia albums are likely to be improved by his having an increased role on the tracks lyrically."

== Track listing ==
All tracks produced by DJ Paul and Juicy J

No.	Title	Length
1.	"Intro"	0:52
2.	"I Ain't Going Back to Jail"	2:54
3.	"Purple" (featuring Beanie Sigel)	4:30
4.	"Raised in the Projects"	3:15
5.	"2 Dollar Niggas"	3:54
6.	"Cocaine"	3:41
7.	"Tell Tell Tell (Stop Snitchin')" (featuring The Last Mr. Bigg, Lyfe Jennings, and Young Jeezy)	4:03
8.	"What Money Do"	4:53
9.	"I Keep That"	2:53
10.	"Crack a Head"	3:10
11.	"You Like"	3:33
12.	"High off the Ground"	4:34
13.	"Get Down"	3:38
14.	"'Cause I'm a Playa" (featuring Pimp C)	3:37
15.	"Good Googly Moogly" (featuring Three 6 Mafia)	3:22
16.	"How It Goes in the Gutta"	3:06
17.	"Nigga Got Popped"	3:05
18.	"Get That Up off Ya"	3:17
19.	"Been Gettin' Money" (featuring Three 6 Mafia)	4:12
20.	"Outro"	4:35
Total length:		65:37

Notes

- "What Money Do" and "High Off" features uncredited vocals by DJ Paul.
- "Get Down" features uncredited vocals by Juicy J.
- "Get That Up Off Ya" featured uncredited vocals by DJ Paul and Juicy J.

== Charts ==
=== Weekly charts ===
Chart (2006)	Peak position
US Billboard 200	64
US Top R&B/Hip-Hop Albums (Billboard)	10
US Top Rap Albums (Billboard)	5
US Indie Store Album Sales (Billboard)	5

=== Year-end charts ===
Chart (2007)	Position
US Top R&B/Hip-Hop Albums (Billboard)	81
