= Hypnotize Minds =

American hip-hop record label owned by Juicy J and DJ Paul

- Parent company: Sony Music Entertainment (SME)
- Founded: 1997
- Founder: DJ Paul; Juicy J
- Defunct: 2012
- Distributor: RED
- Genre: Dirty South, gangsta rap, trap, crunk
- Country of origin: U.S.
- Location: Memphis, Tennessee

Hypnotize Camp Posse
- Also known as: HCP; Hypnotize Minds
- Origin: Memphis, Tennessee, U.S.
- Genres: Southern hip-hop; Memphis rap; gangsta rap; dirty rap; horrorcore; crunk; trap
- Years active: 1997–2012
- Labels: Hypnotize Minds; Columbia; Sony; Sony Urban; Loud; Relativity
- Past members: DJ Paul; Juicy J Lord Infamous; Gangsta Boo; Crunchy Black; Koopsta Knicca; Project Pat; La Chat; M.C. Mack; Scan Man; Lil Pat; Indo G K-Rock; Gangsta Blac; M-Child; Mr. Del; Nigga Creep; Droopy Drew Dog; T-Rock; Frayser Boy; Lil Wyte; Chrome; Yung D

Hypnotize Minds Productions (simply known as Hypnotize Minds; also known as Hypnotize Camp Posse or HCP) was an American record label founded by DJ Paul and Juicy J of Three 6 Mafia in 1997, in Memphis, Tennessee. The label served as the successor to Three 6 Mafia's previous label, Prophet Entertainment, which was co-founded by DJ Paul and Juicy J along with Nicholas ‘Nick Scarfo’ Jackson in 1994. Hypnotize Minds was created after DJ Paul and Juicy J had a disagreement with Jackson, which led to Three 6 Mafia and several other artists previously on the Prophet label to move to the new Hypnotize Minds imprint.

As Hypnotize Camp Posse, the collective released one self-titled group album, Hypnotize Camp Posse, in 2000. The album follows the other Three 6 Mafia-sponsored posse album, 1998's Body Parts by Prophet Posse, which features many of the same artists. Apart from the album, the group, like its predecessor, Prophet Posse, is known for their posse songs, which are featured on nearly every album release by Hypnotize Minds up until 2006, including all Three 6 Mafia albums. The posse songs feature verses from all or most members of the posse and label at the times of recording.

Hypnotize Minds has been assumed defunct since 2012 in conjuncture with Three 6 Mafia's hiatus. Lil Wyte's Still Doubted? (released on June 19, 2012) is the label's most recent release.

== History ==
The label served as the successor to Three 6 Mafia's previous label, Prophet Entertainment, which was co-founded by DJ Paul and Juicy J along with Nicholas ‘Nick Scarfo’ Jackson in 1994. Hypnotize Minds was created after DJ Paul and Juicy J had a disagreement with Jackson, which led to Three 6 Mafia and several other artists previously on the Prophet label to move to the new Hypnotize Minds imprint.

== Notable artists ==
- DJ Paul (1997–2012) co-owner
- Juicy J (1997–2012) co-owner
- Lord Infamous (1997–2005)
- Koopsta Knicca (1997–2000)
- Crunchy Black (1997–2006)
- Gangsta Boo (1997–2001)
- Project Pat (1997–2012)
- La Chat (1997–2002)
- The Kaze (1997–2000)
- Indo G (1997–1998)
- Mr. Del (1998–2000)
- Frayser Boy (2001–2009)
- Lil Wyte (2002–2012)

== Discography ==
Hypnotize Minds and Hypnotize Camp Posse was formed following the split of Prophet Entertainment and Prophet Posse in 1997–1998, with Three 6 Mafia and several other artists moving to the new label.

List of studio albums, with selected chart positions and certifications
Title	Album details	Peak chart positions				Certifications
Title	Album details	US	USR&B	USRap*	USInd.**	Certifications
Chapter 2: World Domination (album by Three 6 Mafia)	Released: November 4, 1997; Label: Hypnotize Minds, Relativity Records; Formats: CD, LP, cassette, digital download	40	18			RIAA: Gold
Angel Dust (album by Indo G)	Released: August 25, 1998; Label: Hypnotize Minds, Relativity Records; Formats: CD, LP, cassette, digital download	105	32			
Enquiring Minds (album by Gangsta Boo)	Released: September 29, 1998; Label: Hypnotize Minds, Relativity Records; Formats: CD, LP, cassette, digital download	46	15			
CrazyNDaLazDayz (album by Tear Da Club Up Thugs of Three 6 Mafia)	Released: February 2, 1999; Label: Hypnotize Minds, Relativity Records; Formats: CD, digital download	18	4			RIAA: Gold
Ghetty Green (album by Project Pat)	Released: September 14, 1999; Label: Hypnotize Minds, Relativity Records; Formats: CD, digital download	52	9		40**	
Three 6 Mafia Presents: Hypnotize Camp Posse (album by Hypnotize Camp Posse)	Released: January 25, 2000; Label: Hypnotize Minds, Loud Records; Formats: CD, LP, cassette, digital download	36	11		1	
When the Smoke Clears: Sixty 6, Sixty 1 (album by Three 6 Mafia)	Released: June 13, 2000; Label: Hypnotize Minds, Loud Records; Formats: CD, LP, cassette, digital download	6	2		1	RIAA: Platinum
Mista Don't Play: Everythangs Workin (album by Project Pat)	Released: February 27, 2001; Label: Hypnotize Minds, Loud Records; Formats: CD, LP, cassette, digital download	4	2		1	RIAA: Gold
Both Worlds *69 (album by Gangsta Boo)	Released: July 31, 2001; Label: Hypnotize Minds, Loud Records Columbia Records; Formats: CD, LP, cassette, digital download	29	8			
Choices: The Album (album by Three 6 Mafia)	Released: August 28, 2001; Label: Hypnotize Minds, Loud Records; Formats: CD, LP, cassette, digital download	19	4			
Murder She Spoke (album by La Chat)	Released: October 23, 2001; Label: Hypnotize Minds, In the Paint Records; Formats: CD, LP, cassette, digital download	78	16		3	
Underground Volume 16: For da Summa (album by DJ Paul)	Released: May 28, 2002; Label: Hypnotize Minds, KOM Music, D Evil Music; Formats: CD, LP, cassette, digital download	127	24		7	
Chronicles of the Juice Man (album by Juicy J)	Released: July 16, 2002; Label: Hypnotize Minds, North North Records; Formats: CD, LP, cassette, digital download	93	17		4	
Layin' da Smack Down (album by Project Pat)	Released: August 6, 2002; Label: Hypnotize Minds, Loud Records Columbia Records; Formats: CD, LP, cassette, digital download	12	5			
Dat's How It Happen to'M (album by Da Headbussaz) (DJ Paul, Juicy J & Fiend)	Released: October 15, 2002; Label: Hypnotize Minds, Fiend Entertainment; Formats: CD, LP, cassette, digital download	98	15		1	
Rock Solid/4:20 (album by T-Rock)	Released: February 18, 2003; Label: Hypnotize Minds, Club Memphis Music; Formats: CD, LP, cassette, digital download		77		42	
Doubt Me Now (album by Lil Wyte)	Released: March 4, 2003; Label: Hypnotize Minds; Formats: CD, LP, cassette, digital download	197	44		6	
Da Unbreakables (album by Three 6 Mafia)	Released: June 24, 2003; Label: Hypnotize Minds, Columbia Records; Formats: CD, LP, cassette, digital download	4	2			RIAA: Gold
Gone on That Bay (album by Frayser Boy)	Released: August 23, 2003; Label: Hypnotize Minds; Formats: CD, LP, cassette, digital download	178	23		9	
The Appeal (mixtape by Project Pat)	Released: November 4, 2003; Label: Hypnotize Minds; Formats: CD, LP, cassette, digital download					
Phinally Phamous (album by Lil Wyte)	Released: October 19, 2004; Label: Hypnotize Minds, Asylum Records; Formats: CD, LP, cassette, digital download	64	6	4*		
Choices II: The Setup (album by Three 6 Mafia)	Released: March 29, 2005; Label: Hypnotize Minds, Columbia Records, Sony Urban Music; Formats: CD, LP, digital download	10	3	2		
Me Being Me (album by Frayser Boy)	Released: July 12, 2005; Label: Hypnotize Minds, Asylum Records; Formats: CD, LP, cassette, digital download	124	24	15		
Most Known Unknown (album by Three 6 Mafia)	Released: September 27, 2005; Label: Hypnotize Minds, Columbia Records, Sony Urban Music, Sony BMG; Formats: CD, LP, digital download	3	1	1		RIAA: Platinum
Straight to the Pros (album by Chrome)	Released: October 25, 2005; Label: Hypnotize Minds; Formats: CD, LP, digital download		45		20	
Most Known Hits (compilation album byThree 6 Mafia)	Released: November 15, 2005; Label: Hypnotize Minds, Columbia Records, Sony Urban Music, Sony BMG; Formats: CD, LP, digital download		38	21		
On My Own (album by Crunchy Black)	Released: September 19, 2006; Label: Hypnotize Minds; Formats: CD, LP, digital download	163	28	13	15	
Smoked Out Music: Greatest Hits (compilation album byThree 6 Mafia)	Released: October 3, 2006; Label: Hypnotize Minds; Formats: CD, LP, digital download		48	22	21	
Crook by da Book: The Fed Story (album by Project Pat)	Released: December 5, 2006; Label: Hypnotize Minds, Columbia Records, Sony Urban Music; Formats: CD, LP, digital download	64	10	5		
Prophet's Greatest Hits (compilation album byThree 6 Mafia)	Released: February 6, 2007; Label: Hypnotize Minds; Formats: CD, LP, digital download		82			
The One and Only (album by Lil Wyte)	Released: June 5, 2007; Label: Hypnotize Minds, Asylum Records; Formats: CD, LP, digital download	46	10	3		
From Me to You (album by Crunchy Black)	Released: June 12, 2007; Label: Hypnotize Minds, Asylum Records; Formats: CD, LP, digital download		32	10		
Walkin' Bank Roll (album by Project Pat)	Released: October 30, 2007; Label: Hypnotize Minds, Koch Records; Formats: CD, LP, digital download	47	6	3	3	
Da Key (album by Frayser Boy)	Released on May 20, 2008; Label: Hypnotize Minds; Formats: CD, LP, digital download		22	8	38	
Last 2 Walk (album by Three 6 Mafia)	Released: June 24, 2008; Label: Hypnotize Minds, Columbia Records, Sony BMG; Formats: CD, LP, digital download	5	2	2		
Project Landlord (album by Chrome)	Released: September 30, 2008; Label: Hypnotize Minds, Asylum Records; Formats: CD, LP, digital download		65			
Real Recognize Real (album by Project Pat)	Released: February 24, 2009; Label: Hypnotize Minds, Asylum Records; Formats: CD, LP, digital download	70	12	3		
Scale-A-Ton (album by DJ Paul)	Released: May 5, 2009; Label: Hypnotize Minds, Scale-A-Ton Entertainment; Formats: CD, LP, digital download	157	26	10	22	
Hustle Till I Die (album by Juicy J)	Released: June 16, 2009; Label: Hypnotize Minds; Formats: CD, LP, digital download	106	21	9	16	
The Bad Influence (album by Lil Wyte)	Released: August 25, 2009; Label: Hypnotize Minds, Asylum Records; Formats: CD, LP, digital download	104	18	5		
Year Round (album by SNO) (Lil Wyte, JellyRoll & BPZ)	Released: April 19, 2011; Label: Hypnotize Minds, Wyte Music, D-Brady Investments; Formats: CD, LP, digital download					
Loud Pack (album by Project Pat)	Released: July 19, 2011; Label: Hypnotize Minds; Formats: CD, LP, digital download		44			
Still Doubted? (album by Lil Wyte)	Released: June 19, 2012; Label: Wyte Music, Hypnotize Minds; Formats: CD, LP, digital download		34	23		
"—" denotes a recording that did not chart or was not released in that territory *Billboard Top 25 Rap Albums began publication the week of November 13, 2004 **Billboard Independent Albums began publication the week of January 29, 2000
