= Real Recognize Real =

Studio album by Project Pat
- Released: February 24, 2009
- Recorded: 2008
- Genre: Southern hip-hop; gangsta rap
- Length: 60:02
- Label: Hypnotize Minds; Asylum
- Producer: DJ Paul; Juicy J

Project Pat chronology
Walkin' Bank Roll (2007)	Real Recognize Real (2009)	Loud Pack (2011)

Professional ratings
Review scores
Source	Rating
Pitchfork	7.7/10
RapReviews	6.5/10

Real Recognize Real is the sixth studio album by American rapper Project Pat. It was released in February 2009 via Hypnotize Minds/Asylum Records.

== Track listing ==
No.	Title	Length
1.	"Intro"	0:46
2.	"Keep It Hood" (featuring OJ da Juiceman)	4:31
3.	"Slick Hater"	3:46
4.	"Catch a Hot One"	4:12
5.	"Bang Smack" (featuring Gucci Mane)	3:21
6.	"I Be Fresh"	3:11
7.	"Dead in the Streets"	3:28
8.	"Ain't Scared of Ya"	4:05
9.	"Gold Teeth"	3:13
10.	"Pogo Stick"	2:51
11.	"Talk Dat Gangsta"	3:17
12.	"Dats the Way You Do It"	3:27
13.	"Choppa to Ya Dome"	3:21
14.	"My Money" (featuring Three 6 Mafia)	3:56
15.	"Horny"	3:20
16.	"Stayin High"	3:26
17.	"Outro"	5:38
18.	"Homicide for the Cash" (iTunes bonus track)	4:01

== Chart history ==
Chart (2009)	Peak position
US Billboard 200	70
US Top R&B/Hip-Hop Albums (Billboard)	12
US Top Rap Albums (Billboard)	3
