= Loud Pack (album) =

Studio album by Project Pat
- Released: July 19, 2011
- Recorded: 2010–2011
- Genre: Southern hip-hop; gangsta rap
- Length: 53:57
- Label: Hypnotize Minds; Select-O-Hits
- Producer: DJ Paul; Juicy J

Project Pat chronology
Real Recognize Real (2009)	Loud Pack (2011)	Mista Don't Play 2: Everythangs Money (2015)

Professional ratings
Review scores
Source	Rating
Rap Reviews	7/10

Loud Pack is the seventh studio album by the American rapper Project Pat. It was released on July 19, 2011, by Hypnotize Minds.

== Track listing ==
All music is composed by DJ Paul and Juicy J.

No.	Title	Length
1.	"Duffle Bag"	4:21
2.	"I Play Dope Boy"	2:57
3.	"I Aint Got Beef"	3:50
4.	"Guess Who"	3:06
5.	"Flashin'"	3:26
6.	"Bloodhound"	3:35
7.	"I Got a Question"	5:13
8.	"Everythangs High"	3:09
9.	"Gang Signs"	3:34
10.	"Niggas So Cut Throat" (featuring Juicy J and Brisco)	3:48
11.	"7 Days a Week"	2:27
12.	"Kelly Green" (featuring Juicy J)	3:03
13.	"Money On My Mind"	3:55
14.	"Penitentiary Chances"	3:05
15.	"Dollar Signs (Remix)" (featuring Three 6 Mafia and Rick Ross)	4:28
Total length:		53:57

== Chart history ==
Chart (2011)	Peak position
US Top R&B/Hip-Hop Albums (Billboard)	44
