= Layin' da Smack Down =

Studio album by Project Pat
- Released: August 6, 2002
- Recorded: 2001–2002
- Studio: Hypnotized Minds Studio (Memphis, TN)
- Genre: Gangsta rap; crunk
- Label: Hypnotize Minds; Loud; Columbia
- Producer: DJ Paul; Juicy J

Project Pat chronology
Mista Don't Play: Everythangs Workin (2001)	Layin' da Smack Down (2002)	Crook by da Book: The Fed Story (2006)

Singles from Layin' da Smack Down
- 1. "Back Clap" Released: 2002; 2. "County Jail/Choose U" Released: 2002

Professional ratings
Review scores
Source	Rating
AllMusic	1.5/5 stars

Layin' da Smack Down is the third solo studio album by American rapper Project Pat. It was released on August 6, 2002, via Hypnotize Minds/Loud/Columbia Records. Recorded at Hypnotized Minds Studio in Memphis, it was produced by DJ Paul and Juicy J. It features a sole guest appearance from Juvenile and cameos by Hypnotize Camp Posse members.

The album marks the final Hypnotize Minds album to be released through Loud Records, as Loud was sold off to Sony around the time of Project Pat's album release. Due to the rapper's incarceration at the time, promotion for the album was very limited. However, it debuted at number 12 on the Billboard 200 with over 70,000 copies sold in its first week of release in the US.

There were two singles released from the album: "Back Clap" and "Choose U"/"County Jail". An accompanying music video was filmed for "Make Dat Azz Clap". In January 2024, the clean version of the track "Choose U" reached number 5 on the TikTok Billboard Top 50 chart.

== Track listing ==
No.	Title	Writer(s)	Length
1.	"Still Ridin' Clean"	Patrick Houston; Paul Beauregard; Jordan Houston	3:37
2.	"The Porch 3"	P. Houston; Beauregard; J. Houston	0:52
3.	"Fight"	P. Houston; Beauregard; J. Houston	5:29
4.	"Weak Niggaz"	P. Houston; Beauregard; J. Houston	4:44
5.	"Make Dat Azz Clap (Back Clap)" (featuring Juvenile)	P. Houston; Beauregard; J. Houston; Orville Hall; Phillip Glen Price	3:49
6.	"Choose U"	P. Houston; Beauregard; J. Houston; Willie Hutchison	2:58
7.	"Smokin' Out"	P. Houston; Beauregard; J. Houston	3:20
8.	"Show Dem Golds"	P. Houston; Beauregard; J. Houston	4:28
9.	"This Pimp"	P. Houston; Beauregard; J. Houston	3:46
10.	"On Nigga"	P. Houston; Beauregard; J. Houston	4:19
11.	"That Drank"	P. Houston; Beauregard; J. Houston	4:27
12.	"MC Flyjo"	P. Houston; Beauregard; J. Houston	1:49
13.	"Posse Song"	P. Houston; Beauregard; J. Houston; Ricky Dunigan; Darnell Carlton; Cedric Coleman; Patrick Lanshaw	3:42
14.	"90 Days"	P. Houston; Beauregard; J. Houston	3:15
15.	"Shut Ya Mouth, Bitch"	P. Houston; Beauregard; J. Houston; Hall; Price	5:25
16.	"Take da Charge"	Beauregard; J. Houston	3:06
17.	"Smoke & Get High"	P. Houston; Beauregard; J. Houston	3:44
18.	"County Jail"	P. Houston; Beauregard; J. Houston	3:52
19.	"I'm MO"	P. Houston; J. Houston	4:15
20.	"Outro"	P. Houston; Beauregard; J. Houston	1:37

Bonus disc
No.	Title	Writer(s)	Performers(s)	Length
21.	"Bonus CD Intro"			0:31
22.	"Juicy "J" Intro"			0:20
23.	"North, North Part 2"	Beauregard	Juicy J	3:41
24.	"DJ Paul Intro"			0:08
25.	"You Scared"	J. Houston	DJ Paul	3:28
26.	"Crash da Club"	Lanshaw; Beauregard; J. Houston	Lil Wyte	4:35
27.	"Mouth Write a Check - Intro"			0:08
28.	"Mouth Write a Check"	Coleman; Beauregard; J. Houston	Frayser Boy	3:37
Total length:				1:29:02

== Charts ==
=== Weekly charts ===
Chart (2002)	Peak position
US Billboard 200	12
US Top R&B/Hip-Hop Albums (Billboard)	5

=== Year-end charts ===
Chart (2002)	Position
US Top R&B/Hip-Hop Albums (Billboard)	95
