= Walkin' Bank Roll =

Studio album by Project Pat
- Released: October 30, 2007
- Recorded: 2007
- Genre: Southern hip-hop; gangsta rap
- Length: 51:15
- Label: Hypnotize Minds; Koch
- Producer: DJ Paul (also exec.); Juicy J (also exec.)

Project Pat chronology
Crook by da Book: The Fed Story (2006)	Walkin' Bank Roll (2007)	Real Recognize Real (2009)

Professional ratings
Review scores
Source	Rating
AllMusic	3/5 stars
Pitchfork	7/10
RapReviews	5/10
XXL	L (3/5)

Walkin' Bank Roll is the fifth studio album by American rapper Project Pat. It was released on October 30, 2007, via Hypnotize Minds/Koch Records. In the album's last song, "Outro", Juicy J informs the listener that the record was originally called Gimme Me but was later changed to Walkin' Bank Roll to reduce confusion. Walkin' Bank Roll debuted at number 47 on the Billboard 200.

Along with the single, a music video was released for "Don't Call Me No Mo'" on October 10, 2007.

== Track listing ==
No.	Title	Length
1.	"On da Porch" (Skit)	0:33
2.	"Rubberband Me"	3:08
3.	"Don't Call Me No Mo" (featuring Three 6 Mafia)	4:00
4.	"Talkin' Smart" (featuring Pimp C)	3:02
5.	"Hate My Swag"	3:21
6.	"Powder"	3:25
7.	"Motivated" (featuring Will Wesson)	3:42
8.	"Wagon Wheels"	2:46
9.	"Hit It" (Skit)	0:44
10.	"Hit It"	3:01
11.	"Finna Start Robbin'"	3:07
12.	"See You Fall"	3:38
13.	"Good Weed"	3:17
14.	"See Me"	3:31
15.	"Bull Frog Yay"	3:56
16.	"Ready for Whateva"	3:05
17.	"Outro"	2:29
Total length:		51:15

iTunes Bonus Track
No.	Title	Length
18.	"Sleepin with the Enemy"	3:55

== Chart history ==
Chart (2007)	Peak position
US Billboard 200	47
US Top R&B/Hip-Hop Albums (Billboard)	6
US Top Rap Albums (Billboard)	3
US Independent Albums (Billboard)	3
US Top Tastemaker Albums (Billboard)	14
