= Murder She Spoke =

Studio album by La Chat
- Released: October 23, 2001
- Genre: Southern hip-hop; gangsta rap
- Length: 1:09:23
- Label: In the Paint; Koch
- Producer: DJ Paul; Juicy J

La Chat chronology
Murder She Spoke (2001)	Ultimate Revenge (2004)

Professional ratings
Review scores
Source	Rating
AllMusic	3/5 stars

Murder She Spoke is the debut solo studio album by American rapper La Chat. It was released on October 23, 2001, through In the Paint Records and Koch Entertainment. Produced by DJ Paul and Juicy J, it features contributions from fellow Hypnotize Minds members throughout the album.

In the United States, the album debuted at number 78 on the Billboard 200, number 16 on the Top R&B/Hip-Hop Albums, and number 3 on the Independent Albums charts.

The album's sequel, Murder She Spoke II, was released in 2015.

== Track listing ==
All tracks are written by Chastity Daniels, Paul D. Beauregard and Jordan Houston.

No.	Title	Length
1.	"Intro"	1:33
2.	"Don't Sang It"	4:46
3.	"A Crumb 2 a Brick"	2:53
4.	"You Ain't Mad Iz Ya"	4:36
5.	"Ghetto Ballin'"	2:47
6.	"Slob on My Cat Intro"	0:16
7.	"Slob on My Cat"	1:43
8.	"Salt Shakers Hotline"	1:55
9.	"Salt Shakers"	4:25
10.	"Smoke Witcha"	2:39
11.	"Peanut Butter"	4:40
12.	"U Claimin' You're Real"	5:21
13.	"Luv 2 Get High"	3:53
14.	"Make Somethin'"	3:54
15.	"Ain't No Nigga"	3:10
16.	"Nigga Comin' Clean"	3:51
17.	"What Kinda Bitch Do You Want"	3:17
18.	"I Don't Trust Dem Boys"	4:22
19.	"Yeah, I Rob"	3:56
20.	"Wolf Pack"	4:08
21.	"Outroduction"	1:18
Total length:		1:09:23

== Charts ==
Chart (2001)	Peak position
US Billboard 200	78
US Top R&B/Hip-Hop Albums (Billboard)	16
US Independent Albums (Billboard)	3
