= Ghetty Green =

Studio album by Project Pat
- Released: September 14, 1999
- Recorded: 1998–1999
- Studios: Hypnotize Minds Studios; Cotton Row Recording Studio
- Genre: Hip-hop
- Length: 1:12:45
- Labels: Hypnotize Minds; Loud; RED
- Producers: DJ Paul (also exec.); Juicy J (also exec.); Mannie Fresh

Project Pat chronology
Ghetty Green (1999)	Murderers & Robbers (2000)

Singles from Ghetty Green
- 1. "Ballers" Released: 1999; 2. "Represent It" Released: June 29, 1999

Professional ratings
Review scores
Source	Rating
AllMusic	4/5 stars
The Encyclopedia of Popular Music	2/5 stars
The Source	2.5/5 stars

Ghetty Green is the debut studio album by American rapper Project Pat. It was released on September 14, 1999, through Hypnotize Minds, Loud Records, and RED Distribution. The recording sessions took place at Hypnotize Minds Studio and Cotton Row Recording Studio in Memphis, Tennessee. The production was primarily handled by DJ Paul and Juicy J, who also served as executive producers. It features guest appearances from Three 6 Mafia, Cash Money Millionaires, Crucial Conflict, Krayzie Bone and Noreaga.

The album's title is a Memphis slang term for money. According to Project Pat, earning money was the main theme of the album. He wrote half of the album while he was in jail. Jim Farber of New York Daily News highlighted the album's "tough street themes" and its "sinister", bass-heavy sound. In an interview with Soren Baker of Rap Pages, Project Pat explained that he was aiming for "fat, Memphis-distorted bass" that will grab listener's attention before they can hear lyrics.

Ghetty Green peaked at number 52 on the Billboard 200 and at number 9 on the Top R&B/Hip-Hop Albums chart in the United States. The album spawned two singles: "Represent It" and "Ballers". "Ballers", the album's lead single, reached number 75 on the US Billboard Hot R&B/Hip-Hop Songs chart.

== Background ==
The voice of Francis Manansis, the female character featured in the album's "Rinky Dink" skits, was provided by Jessica "Kermit" Solomon. Solomon died on August 6, 2023, at the age of 43.

== Track listing ==
All tracks are written by Patrick Houston, Jordan Houston, and Paul Beauregard, except where noted. All tracks produced by DJ Paul and Juicy J, except "Choppers", produced by DJ Paul, Juicy J, and Mannie Fresh.

No.	Title	Writer(s)	Length
1.	"North Memphis"		1:38
2.	"Represent It" (featuring Noreaga and Tear Da Club Up Thugs)	P. Houston; J. Houston; Beauregard; Victor Santiago	3:58
3.	"Out There"		4:19
4.	"Niggas Got Me Fucked Up"		2:32
5.	"You Know the Biss" (featuring DJ Paul)		3:32
6.	"Choices" (featuring Lord Infamous)	P. Houston; J. Houston; Beauregard; Curtis Mayfield	2:45
7.	"Ballers" (featuring Gangsta Boo)		4:01
8.	"Run a Train"		4:00
9.	"Rinky Dink / Whatever Ho" (featuring Hypnotize Camp Posse)		5:31
10.	"Up There" (featuring Krayzie Bone and Mac E)	P. Houston; J. Houston; Beauregard; Anthony Henderson	4:13
11.	"Rinky Dink II / We're Gonna Rumble"		4:13
12.	"Choppers" (featuring B.G. and Big Tymers) (Additional Vocals: M.C. Mack, Big Triece & Pancho Villa)		3:52
13.	"Gold Shine" (featuring Crunchy Black, DJ Paul, Gangsta Boo, and Juicy J)		3:55
14.	"Ghetty Green"		4:19
15.	"Sucks on Dick" (featuring Juicy J)		3:03
16.	"Shake That Ass"		2:37
17.	"Stabbers" (featuring Crucial Conflict)	P. Houston; J. Houston; Beauregard; Wondosas Martin; Marrico King; Corey Johnson; Ralph Leverston; Leon Huff; Gene McFadden; John Whitehead	4:21
18.	"Slangin' Rocks" (featuring Gangsta Boo & DJ Paul)		3:17
19.	"528-Cash"		2:18
20.	"Ballers / Outro (Cash Money Remix)" (featuring Tear Da Club Up Thugs, Juvenile, Hot Boys, and Big Tymers)		5:01

Sample credits

- "Choices" contains elements from "Choice of Colors", written and performed by Curtis Mayfield.
- "Stabbers" contains elements from "Back Stabbers"; written by Leon Huff, Gene McFadden, and John Whitehead; performed by The O'Jays.

== Personnel ==
- Patrick Houston – main artist
- Jordan Houston – featured artist, producer, executive producer
- Paul Beauregard – featured artist, producer, executive producer
- Darnell Carlton – featured artist
- Ricky Dunigan – featured artist
- Lola Mitchell – featured artist
- Anthony Henderson – featured artist
- Victor Santiago Jr. – featured artist
- Byron Thomas – featured artist, producer
- Bryan Christopher Brooks – featured artist
- Christopher Noel Dorsey – featured artist
- Terius Gray – featured artist
- Crucial Conflict – featured artists
- Kirk Clayton – programming
- Lil' Pat – mixing & recording (tracks: 1, 3–6, 8, 9, 11, 13–19)
- Niko Lyras – mixing & recording (tracks: 2, 7, 10, 12, 20)
- L. Nix & Company Inc. – mastering
- Pen & Pixel – artwork, design
- Steve Roberts – photography

== Chart history ==
Chart (1999)	Peak position
US Billboard 200	52
US Top R&B/Hip-Hop Albums (Billboard)	9
US Independent Albums (Billboard)	40
