= La Chat =

American rapper (born 1978)

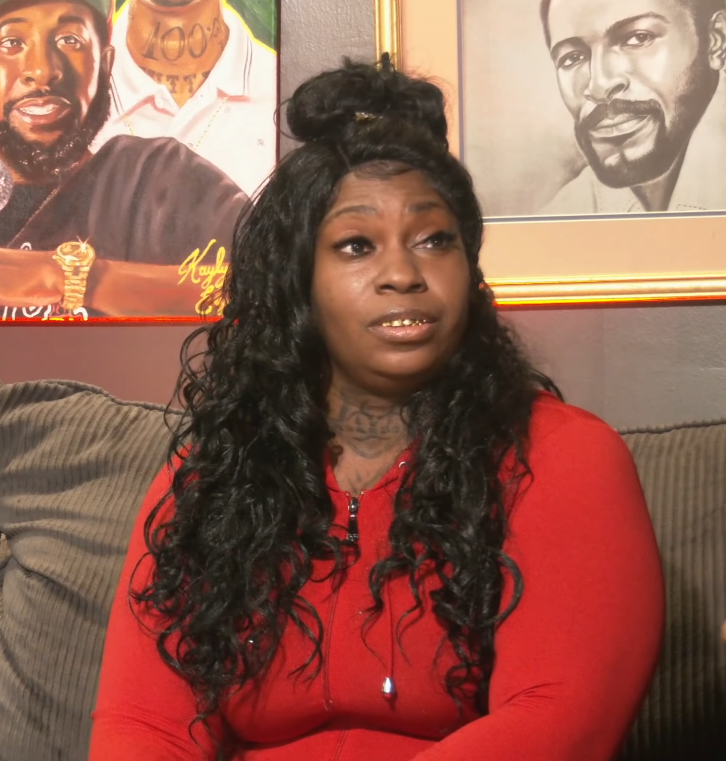
- La Chat in 2022

Background information
- Born: Chastity Darnestine Daniels; March 21, 1978 (age 48); Memphis, Tennessee, U.S.
- Genres: Gangsta rap; hardcore hip-hop; Southern hip-hop
- Occupations: Rapper; songwriter
- Years active: 1995–present
- Labels: Prophet; Hypnotize Minds; Drum Squad; Phixieous
- Formerly of: Hypnotize Camp Posse

Chastity Darnestine Daniels (born March 21, 1978), known professionally as La Chat, is an American rapper from Memphis, Tennessee. She is best known for her association with the Hypnotize Minds record label and the Memphis-based hip-hop group Three 6 Mafia.

== Career ==
In 2000, La Chat made a guest appearance on the hit Project Pat song "Chickenhead", which helped her gain widespread recognition.

La Chat left Hypnotize Minds some time after the release of her debut album, Murder She Spoke (2001). She went on to release a number of albums and mixtapes for different record labels in the following years.

In 2010, La Chat won Female Rap Artist of the Year at the Knocdown-SCM Awards.

La Chat and Gangsta Boo's collaborative extended play Witch came out on May 27, 2014.

== Discography ==
=== Studio albums ===
List of studio albums, with selected chart positions
Title	Album details	Peak chart positions		
Title	Album details	US	US Ind.	US R&B
Murder She Spoke	Released: October 23, 2001; Label: Entertainment One; Formats: CD, cassette	78	3	16
Ultimate Revenge	Released: July 13, 2004; Label: Power N' Industry; Formats: CD, Digital download	—	—	92
Dramatize	Released: November 2, 2004; Label: Rap Hustlaz; Formats: CD	—	—	—
Bad Influence	Released: November 28, 2006; Label: Inevitable Records; Formats: CD	—	—	—
Da Hood Homegirl: Da Album	Released: July 22, 2008; Label: Oarfin Records; Formats: CD, Digital download	—	—	—
Krumbz 2 Brickz	Released: April 16, 2010; Label: Dime A Dozen Entertainment; Formats: CD, Digital download	—	—	—
Witch (with Gangsta Boo)	Released: May 27, 2014; Label: Phixieous Entertainment; Formats: CD, Digital download	—	—	—
Murder She Spoke II	Released: April 7, 2015; Label: Phixieous Entertainment; Formats: CD, Digital download	—	—	—
Drama Queen- Who Want Smoke?	Released: February 8, 2019; Label: Dime-A-Dozen Entertainment; Formats: CD, Digital download	—	—	—
Hood (with Crunchy Black)	Released: November 28, 2022; Label: Dime-A-Dozen Entertainment, Hardhittin Money Gang; Formats: CD, Digital download	—	—	—

=== Singles ===
==== As lead artist ====
List of singles as lead artist
Title	Year	Album
"On That" (with Gangsta Boo featuring Lil Wyte)"	2013	Non-album single
"Memphis Bxtch"	2014	Murder She Spoke II
"Fake Smiles"	2014	Murder She Spoke II
"Moving Slow" (with Joddski, Gangsta Boo, Klish, and Kholebeatz)	2017	Non-album singles
"Work" (with Smoke Corleone and Sheena Thrash)	2018	Non-album singles
"Baldhead" (with 38)	2020	Non-album singles
"Looking For" (with Uzi Dre)	2020	Non-album singles
"Web Killa" (with 38)	2020	Non-album singles
"2Times" (with Kholebeatz and 46Simmy)	2021	Non-album singles
"Still That" (with Sade Shine)	2021	Non-album singles
"Drag Em In Da River" (with Gangsta Boo)	2021	Non-album singles
"Ghetto 2 Ghetto" (with Crunchy Black)	2022	Hood
"Check 'Em" (with Crunchy Black)	2022	Hood
"Letter 2 Lola (Gangsta Boo)" (with Derez De'Shon)	2023	Non-album single

==== As featured artist ====
List of singles as featured artist
Title	Year	Album
"Gangsta Forever" (Tommy Wright III featuring Playa Fly and La Chat)	1996	On The Run
"Ratchet Misses" (Natalac featuring La Chat)	2018	Pimp of the Nation
"Run for Your Life" (clipping. featuring La Chat)	2019	There Existed an Addiction to Blood
"Smokers Anthem 420" (Byg Kurse and Gangsta Blac featuring La Chat)	2023	Non-album singles
"My Bottom" (Natalac featuring La Chat)	2024	Non-album singles
