= Indo G =

American rapper

- Born: Tobian Tools; December 31, 1974 (age 51)
- Origin: Memphis, Tennessee, U.S.
- Genres: Southern hip-hop; gangsta rap
- Occupation: Rapper
- Years active: 1989–present
- Label: Prophet

Tobian Tools, known professionally as Indo G, is an American rapper from Memphis, Tennessee. First hitting the Memphis rap scene with fellow Memphian Lil' Blunt in the mid-1990s, they released two albums on Luke Records, Up in Smoke (1995) and The Antidote (1995). Soon after, Indo G became affiliated with Three 6 Mafia and released Angel Dust in 1998. However, the relationship between the group and Indo G deteriorated, and they split off from each other.

== Discography ==
=== Studio albums ===
- Angel Dust (1998)
- Christmas N' Memphis (2002)
- Kill the Noise (2006)
- Purple Drank (2007)

=== Collaboration albums ===
- The Antidote with Lil' Blunt (1994)
- 19 Nigga 4 with Lil' Blunt (1994)
- Up in Smoke with Lil' Blunt (1995)
- Live and Learn with The Ghetto Troopers (2000)
- Contact with Lil' Blunt (2002)

=== Compilation albums ===
- Down South Ballin' (1997)

=== Extended plays ===
- Crossfire with Lil' Blunt (1992)

=== Singles ===
- "Blame It on the Funk" with Lil' Blunt (1994)
- "Remember Me Ballin'" featuring Gangsta Boo (1998)
- "Giddy Up" (Tommy Boy Records Promo) (2001)

=== Soundtrack appearances ===
- "Giddy Up" (Remix Promo) (from Kung Faux) (2001)

== See also ==
- Three 6 Mafia
