= Project Pat =

American rapper (born 1973)

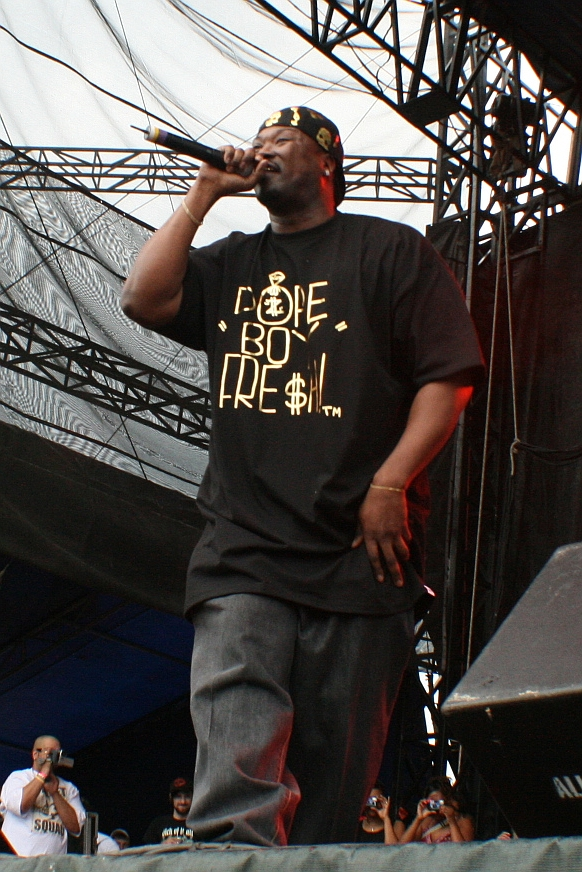
- Project Pat performing in 2007

Background information
- Born: Patrick Earl Houston; February 8, 1973 (age 53); North Memphis, Memphis, Tennessee, U.S.
- Genres: Memphis rap; gangsta rap
- Occupation: Rapper
- Years active: 1991–present
- Labels: Project; Loud; SRC; Taylor Gang; Hypnotize Minds; E1; X-Ray; Cleopatra; Relativity
- Formerly of: The Kaze; Hypnotize Camp Posse

Patrick Earl Houston (born February 8, 1973), known professionally as Project Pat, is an American rapper from Memphis, Tennessee. He is the older brother of Juicy J, the co-founder of Three 6 Mafia.

Houston was formerly a member of the hip-hop group the Kaze, joining in 1998, the same year that their debut album Kamakazie Timez Up was released.

== Career ==
=== Music beginnings and Ghetty Green ===
Project Pat released his debut solo album Ghetty Green in 1999 on his brother Juicy J's Hypnotize Minds label. He became an affiliated member of Juicy and DJ Paul's group Three 6 Mafia, and first gained mainstream attention when he provided the hook for the group's hit single "Sippin' on Some Syrup" in 2000.

=== 2000–2002: Mista Don't Play: Everythangs Workin and Layin' Da Smack Down ===
Houston released his second studio album Mista Don't Play: Everythangs Workin on February 13, 2001. The singles "Chickenhead" and "Don't Save Her" gained national radio airplay, along with music videos appearing on BET and MTV.

Houston's third album Layin' Da Smack Down was released in 2002 and featured a video made for "Make Dat Azz Clap".

=== 2002–2006: Release and Crook by da Book: The Fed Story ===
In 2005, Houston released Crook by da Book: The Fed Story which reached #64 on the Billboard 200, selling about 40,000 copies in its first week. The first single off the album was "Good Googly Moogly" featuring DJ Paul and Juicy J.

=== 2007–2011: Walkin' Bank Roll, Real Recognize Real & Loud Pack ===
After Houston was released from his deal with Columbia he signed with Koch, now known as E1. His fifth studio album Walkin' Bank Roll was released in 2007 and debuted at No. 45 on the Billboard 200. The lead single from the album was "Don't Call Me No Mo'" featuring Three 6 Mafia. His sixth studio album Real Recognize Real was his first major release for the label Asylum Records. The album featured the hit single "Keep It Hood" featuring OJ da Juiceman. It debuted at No. 8 on the Top Rap Albums Chart, with about 10,000 copies sold in the first week of release. On July 19, 2011, Houston released his seventh studio album Loud Pack on Hypnotize Minds and his newly founded label Project.

=== 2012–present: Mixtapes and Mista Don't Play 2 ===
On March 28, 2013, Houston announced that his next album would be titled Mista Don't Play 2. The album would be released by E1 Music, the first single will be "Be A G", and feature Juicy J, along with the late Doe B. Juicy J also produces half of the album. The album was released on April 14, 2015.

On August 15, 2016, Houston appeared on the J. Sims song "Visa", which appeared on the Mattrix Mixtape: We're Going Worldwide, Vol 5 compilation, presented by Matthew Rix. He announced a mixtape titled M.O.B. which was released on September 8, 2017.

In 2021, Project Pat was featured on the single "Knife Talk" on Drake's album Certified Lover Boy which reached number 4 on the Billboard Hot 100.

In 2023, Pat began collaborating with Juicy J on a joint album titled DEM GOATS, which released in 2026.

== Personal life ==
Houston often visits prisons to perform motivational speaking. He is the founder of the Go Foundation, a Collierville, Tennessee-based nonprofit organization that focuses on prison ministry.

On January 10, 2025, Houston's son Patrick Houston Jr. was fatally shot in the Imogene Heights neighborhood of Memphis.

== Discography ==
Studio albums

- Ghetty Green (1999)
- Mista Don't Play: Everythangs Workin (2001)
- Layin' da Smack Down (2002)
- Crook by da Book: The Fed Story (2006)
- Walkin' Bank Roll (2007)
- Real Recognize Real (2009)
- Loud Pack (2011)
- Mista Don't Play 2: Everythangs Money (2015)
- M.O.B. (2017)
- Dem Goats with Juicy J (2026)

== Filmography ==
- "Big Pat" in Choices: The Movie (2001)
