= List of 2007 albums =

The following is a list of albums, EPs, and mixtapes released in 2007. These albums are (1) original, i.e. excluding reissues, remasters, and compilations of previously released recordings, and (2) notable, defined as having received significant coverage from reliable sources independent of the subject.

For additional information about bands formed, reformed, disbanded, or on hiatus, for deaths of musicians, and for links to musical awards, see 2007 in music.

== First quarter ==
=== January ===
List of albums released in January 2007
Go to: January | February | March | April | May | June | July | August | September | October | November | December | Back to top
Release date	Artist	Album	Genre	Label	Ref.
January 7	of Montreal	Hissing Fauna, Are You the Destroyer?	Indie pop, glam rock, art pop	Polyvinyl	
January 8	Gruff Rhys	Candylion	Alternative rock	Rough Trade, Team Love	
January 8	Kylie Minogue	Showgirl: Homecoming Live		Parlophone, EMI	
January 9	Neko Case	Live from Austin, TX	Alternative country	New West	
January 12	Therion	Gothic Kabbalah	Symphonic gothic metal, progressive metal	Nuclear Blast	
January 15	Grave Digger	Liberty or Death	Heavy metal	Locomotive	
January 16	America	Here & Now	Soft rock	Burgundy	
January 16	The Smithereens	Meet The Smithereens!	Rock	Koch	
January 22	A Day to Remember	For Those Who Have Heart	Pop-punk	Victory	
January 22	The Good, the Bad & the Queen	The Good, the Bad & the Queen	Art rock	Parlophone, Honest Jon's, EMI	
January 22	Tristania	Illumination	Gothic metal	SPV/Steamhammer	
January 22	The View	Hats Off to the Buskers	Indie rock	1965	
January 23	Beneath the Sky	What Demons Do to Saints	Metalcore, deathcore	Victory	
January 23	The Bird and the Bee	The Bird and the Bee	Indie pop	Blue Note	
January 23	Bracken	We Know About the Need	Post-rock	Anticon	
January 23	Deerhoof	Friend Opportunity	Pop rock, experimental pop, avant-garde	Kill Rock Stars, ATP, 5 Rue Christine	
January 23	Dustin Kensrue	Please Come Home	Alternative country	Equal Vision	
January 23	Epik High	Remapping the Human Soul	K-pop, hip-hop	Woollim, CJ ENM	
January 23	Ghost	In Stormy Nights	Neo-psychedelia, experimental rock	Drag City	
January 23	John Mellencamp	Freedom's Road	Rock, country rock	Universal South	
January 23	Julie Doiron	Woke Myself Up	Indie rock	Jagjaguwar, Endearing	
January 23	Menomena	Friend and Foe	Indie rock	Barsuk	
January 23	Mister Mann	December Looms	Folk rock		
January 23	Pretty Ricky	Late Night Special	R&B, hip-hop	Bluestar, Atlantic	
January 23	Saliva	Blood Stained Love Story	Rap rock, post-grunge	Island	
January 23	The Shins	Wincing the Night Away	Indie rock, indie pop, post-punk revival	Sub Pop	
January 23	The Six Parts Seven	Casually Smashed to Pieces	Post-rock	Suicide Squeeze	
January 24	Bloc Party	A Weekend in the City	Indie rock, alternative rock	Wichita	
January 26	Madonna	The Confessions Tour		Warner Bros.	
January 29	Clap Your Hands Say Yeah	Some Loud Thunder	Indie rock	Wichita, V2	
January 29	Deerhunter	Cryptograms	Art punk	Kranky	
January 29	Jamie T	Panic Prevention	British hip-hop, indie rock	Virgin	
January 29	Just Jack	Overtones	Hip-hop, house	Mercury	
January 29	Klaxons	Myths of the Near Future	Dance-punk, new rave, pop rock	Polydor	
January 29	Little Man Tate	About What You Know	Indie rock	V2	
January 29	Nick Cave and the Bad Seeds	The Abattoir Blues Tour	Rock	Mute	
January 30	Beirut	Lon Gisland	Indie folk	Ba Da Bing	
January 30	Busdriver	RoadKillOvercoat	Hip-hop	Epitaph	
January 30	Harry Connick Jr.	Chanson du Vieux Carré: Connick on Piano, Volume 3	Big band	Marsalis	
January 30	Harry Connick Jr.	Oh, My NOLA	Big band	Sony Music, Columbia	
January 30	Katharine McPhee	Katharine McPhee		RCA	
January 30	Norah Jones	Not Too Late		Blue Note	
January 30	Sean Price	Jesus Price Supastar	East Coast hip-hop, hardcore hip-hop	Duck Down Music	
January 30	Skinny Puppy	Mythmaker	Electro-industrial	Synthetic Symphony	
January 30	X Clan	Return from Mecca	Political hip-hop	Suburban Noize	
January 31	Glay	Love Is Beautiful	Rock	EMI Japan	

=== February ===
List of albums released in February 2007
Go to: January | February | March | April | May | June | July | August | September | October | November | December | Back to top
Release date	Artist	Album	Genre	Label	Ref.
February 5	Aereogramme	My Heart Has a Wish That You Would Not Go	Alternative rock	Chemikal Underground	
February 5	Belinda Carlisle	Voila	Chanson, pop	Rykodisc	
February 5	Mika	Life in Cartoon Motion	Dance-pop, glam rock, disco	Casablanca	
February 5	Noisettes	What's the Time Mr Wolf?	Indie rock	Vertigo, Mercury, Universal	
February 6	Apostle of Hustle	National Anthem of Nowhere	Indie rock	Arts & Crafts	
February 6	The Apples in Stereo	New Magnetic Wonder	Indie pop, neo-psychedelia	Simian, Elephant 6, Yep Roc	
February 6	Barenaked Ladies	Barenaked Ladies Are Men	Alternative rock	Desperation	
February 6	Bayside	The Walking Wounded	Emo, punk rock, hard rock	Victory	
February 6	Dear and the Headlights	Small Steps, Heavy Hooves	Indie rock	Equal Vision	
February 6	Fall Out Boy	Infinity on High	Pop-punk, pop rock, alternative rock	Island	
February 6	Jesse Sykes and the Sweet Hereafter	Like, Love, Lust and the Open Halls of the Soul	Psychedelic folk, alternative country	Barsuk, Southern Lord	
February 6	Jordan Pruitt	No Ordinary Girl	Pop	Hollywood	
February 6	Lifetime	Lifetime	Hardcore punk, pop-punk	Decaydance, Fueled by Ramen	
February 6	Patty Griffin	Children Running Through	Folk, Americana, country folk	ATO	
February 6	Secondhand Serenade	Awake		Glassnote	
February 6	Sondre Lerche	Phantom Punch	Pop	Astralwerks	
February 6	The Used	Berth	Emo, post-hardcore	Reprise	
February 6	Yoko Ono	Yes, I'm a Witch		Astralwerks, Apple	
February 7	Dir En Grey	The Marrow of a Bone	Metalcore	Firewall Div., Sony Music Japan	
February 7	Swallow the Sun	Hope	Death-doom, melodic death metal	Spinefarm	
February 12	Do Make Say Think	You, You're a History in Rust	Post-rock	Constellation	
February 12	The Fall	Reformation Post TLC	Alternative rock	Slogan Records, Narnack	
February 13	Lucinda Williams	West		Lost Highway	
February 19	Comeback Kid	Broadcasting...	Hardcore punk	Victory	
February 19	Fu Manchu	We Must Obey	Stoner rock	Liquor and Poker, Century Media	
February 19	Sarah Nixey	Sing, Memory	Electropop, dance-pop, downtempo	ServiceAV	
February 19	Various artists	We All Love Ennio Morricone		Sony Music	
February 20	Anberlin	Cities	Alternative rock	Tooth & Nail, Stomp, Howling Bull	
February 20	Aqueduct	Or Give Me Death		Barsuk	
February 20	The Ataris	Welcome the Night	Alternative rock	Isola, Sanctuary	
February 20	Beneath the Massacre	Mechanics of Dysfunction	Technical death metal, deathcore	Prosthetic	
February 20	The Besnard Lakes	The Besnard Lakes Are the Dark Horse	Post-rock, psychedelic rock, indie rock	Jagjaguwar, Outside Music	
February 20	Explosions in the Sky	All of a Sudden I Miss Everyone	Post-rock	Temporary Residence	
February 20	Hell Razah	Renaissance Child	Hip-hop	Nature Sounds	
February 20	Kittie	Funeral for Yesterday	Heavy metal, hard rock	X of Infamy	
February 20	Marnie Stern	In Advance of the Broken Arm	Experimental rock, indie rock	Kill Rock Stars	
February 20	Novembers Doom	The Novella Reservoir	Death-doom, gothic metal	The End	
February 20	Television Personalities	Are We Nearly There Yet?	Post-punk, indie pop	Overground Records	
February 20	TobyMac	Portable Sounds	CCM, pop rap, pop rock	ForeFront	
February 21	Hanson	The Walk	Pop rock	3CG Records	
February 21	Ringo Sheena & Neko Saito	Heisei Fūzoku	Jazz, electronica	Toshiba EMI, Virgin	
February 23	Manowar	Gods of War	Symphonic power metal	Magic Circle Music	
February 23	Sirenia	Nine Destinies and a Downfall	Gothic metal, symphonic metal	Nuclear Blast	
February 26	Kaiser Chiefs	Yours Truly, Angry Mob	Indie rock, power pop, post-punk revival	B-Unique, Universal Motown	
February 26	Patrick Wolf	The Magic Position	Folktronica, indietronica	Loog	
February 27	B.G. and Chopper City Boyz	We Got This	Gangsta rap, Southern hip-hop	Chopper City, Koch	
February 27	Boss Hogg Outlawz	Serve & Collect	Southern hip-hop, gangsta rap	Boss Hogg Outlawz Records, Koch	
February 27	Dälek	Abandoned Language	Experimental hip-hop, industrial hip-hop	Ipecac	
February 27	David Bromberg	Try Me One More Time	Folk, blues	Appleseed	
February 27	Dean & Britta	Back Numbers	Indie pop	Rounder	
February 27	Dr. Dog	We All Belong	Rock, psychedelic rock	Park the Van	

=== March ===
List of albums released in March 2007
Go to: January | February | March | April | May | June | July | August | September | October | November | December | Back to top
Release date	Artist	Album	Genre	Label	Ref.
March 5	!!!	Myth Takes	Dance-punk	Warp	
March 5	Air	Pocket Symphony	Ambient, pop, electronic	Virgin	
March 5	Alphabeat	Alphabeat	Pop, indie pop	Copenhagen	
March 5	Amon Tobin	Foley Room	IDM, downtempo, experimental	Ninja Tune	
March 5	Arcade Fire	Neon Bible	Indie rock	Merge	
March 5	Bryan Ferry	Dylanesque	Pop rock	Virgin	
March 5	Charlotte Hatherley	The Deep Blue	Post-punk, power pop	Little Sister Records	
March 5	Emmure	Goodbye to the Gallows	Metalcore, deathcore	Victory	
March 5	Grinderman	Grinderman	Alternative rock, garage rock	Mute, Anti-	
March 5	The Horrors	Strange House	Garage punk, gothic rock	Loog	
March 5	Idlewild	Make Another World	Rock	Sequel Records	
March 5	Korn	MTV Unplugged: Korn	Acoustic rock	EMI, Virgin	
March 5	Saxon	The Inner Sanctum	Heavy metal	SPV/Steamhammer	
March 5	The Stooges	The Weirdness	Garage rock, hard rock, jazz rock	Virgin	
March 5	Tracey Thorn	Out of the Woods	Pop, dance, electronica	Virgin	
March 6	Bright Eyes	Four Winds	Indie rock	Saddle Creek	
March 6	Chimaira	Resurrection	Groove metal, metalcore	Ferret Music, Nuclear Blast	
March 6	Consequence	Don't Quit Your Day Job!	Hip-hop	GOOD Music, Columbia	
March 6	Dying Fetus	War of Attrition	Technical death metal	Relapse	
March 6	Finger Eleven	Them vs. You vs. Me	Alternative rock	Wind-up	
March 6	Relient K	Five Score and Seven Years Ago	Christian rock, pop-punk, alternative rock	Capitol, Gotee	
March 6	RJD2	The Third Hand		XL	
March 6	Ry Cooder	My Name Is Buddy	Americana	Nonesuch	
March 6	Sevendust	Alpha	Alternative metal	Asylum	
March 6	Son Volt	The Search	Rock, alternative country	Transmit Sound, Legacy	
March 6	Twisted Black	Street Fame	Hip-hop	TVT	
March 6	Various artists	Glory Revealed	CCM	Reunion	
March 6	Vijay Iyer and Mike Ladd	Still Life with Commentator	Jazz	Savoy Jazz	
March 9	Joss Stone	Introducing Joss Stone	R&B, soul, hip-hop	Virgin	
March 9	Within Temptation	The Heart of Everything	Symphonic metal, gothic metal	GUN, Roadrunner	
March 12	Ben Mills	Picture of You	Pop rock	Sony BMG	
March 12	Calogero	Pomme C	Pop, rock	Mercury	
March 12	LCD Soundsystem	Sound of Silver	Dance-punk	DFA, Capitol, EMI	
March 12	Marissa Nadler	Songs III: Bird on the Water	Folk	Peacefrog, Kemado	
March 12	Nightrage	A New Disease Is Born	Melodic death metal	Lifeforce	
March 12	Simply Red	Stay	Soul	Simplyred.com	
March 13	8Ball & MJG	Ridin High	Hip-hop	Bad Boy South, Atlantic	
March 13	Aqualung	Memory Man		Columbia	
March 13	Black Milk	Popular Demand	Hip-hop	Fat Beats	
March 13	Dokken	From Conception: Live 1981	Heavy metal	Rhino, Frontiers	
March 13	Ken Andrews	Secrets of the Lost Satellite	Alternative rock, pop rock	Dinosaur Fight Records	
March 13	Lloyd	Street Love	R&B	Young Goldie Music, The Inc., Universal Motown	
March 13	Musiq Soulchild	Luvanmusiq	R&B, neo soul	Atlantic	
March 13	Neil Young	Live at Massey Hall 1971	Folk rock	Reprise	
March 13	Rich Boy	Rich Boy	Gangsta rap, Southern hip-hop	Interscope, Zone 4	
March 13	Tinariwen	Aman Iman	Desert blues, folk, world	World Village	
March 13	Type O Negative	Dead Again	Gothic metal	Steamhammer	
March 13	Unsane	Visqueen	Ipecac	Post-hardcore, punk metal	
March 16	Various artists	The Secret Sessions	Indie rock	Zunior	
March 17	Laura Veirs	Saltbreakers	Folk	Nonesuch	
March 19	Enter Shikari	Take to the Skies	Post-hardcore, trance, metalcore	Ambush Reality	
March 19	Marques Houston	Veteran	R&B	TUG, Universal Motown	
March 19	The Rakes	Ten New Messages		V2	
March 20	Adult	Why Bother?	Electronic, Detroit techno	Thrill Jockey	
March 20	Andrew Bird	Armchair Apocrypha	Indie folk, folk rock, baroque pop	Fat Possum	
March 20	Big D and the Kids Table	Strictly Rude	Dub, ska punk, reggae	SideOneDummy	
March 20	Clutch	From Beale Street to Oblivion	Stoner rock, blues rock	DRT	
March 20	Crime Mob	Hated on Mostly	Crunk, Southern hip-hop, snap	Crunk Incorporated, Reprise	
March 20	Dååth	The Hinderers	Death metal, groove metal	Roadrunner	
March 20	Earth	Hibernaculum	Drone doom, post-rock, post-metal	Southern Lord	
March 20	El-P	I'll Sleep When You're Dead	Hip-hop	Definitive Jux	
March 20	Elliott Yamin	Elliott Yamin		Hickory, RED	
March 20	Evidence	The Weatherman LP	Underground hip-hop	ABB Records	
March 20	Haste the Day	Pressure the Hinges	Metalcore, Christian metal	Solid State	
March 20	In This Moment	Beautiful Tragedy	Metalcore, hard rock, melodic metalcore	Century Media	
March 20	Insane Clown Posse	The Tempest	Horrorcore	Psychopathic	
March 20	Low	Drums and Guns	Post-rock, indie electronic, ambient pop	Sub Pop	
March 20	Maylene and the Sons of Disaster	II	Groove metal, Southern rock	Ferret Music	
March 20	Modest Mouse	We Were Dead Before the Ship Even Sank	Indie rock, post-punk revival	Epic	
March 20	Panda Bear	Person Pitch	Psychedelic pop	Paw Tracks	
March 20	The Ponys	Turn the Lights Out	Indie rock, garage rock	Matador	
March 20	Robert Glasper	In My Element	Post-bop	Blue Note	
March 20	Ted Leo and the Pharmacists	Living with the Living	Art punk, punk rock, indie rock	Touch and Go	
March 20	Willie Nelson, Merle Haggard and Ray Price	Last of the Breed	Country, Western swing	Lost Highway	
March 20	You Say Party	Lose All Time	Indie rock, dance-punk	Paper Bag	
March 21	Hilary Duff	Dignity	Dance-pop, electropop	Hollywood	
March 21	Macy Gray	Big	R&B, soul, neo soul	will.i.am music, Geffen	
March 23	Ensiferum	Victory Songs	Folk metal, melodic death metal, power metal	Spinefarm	
March 23	Jennifer Lopez	Como Ama una Mujer	Latin pop, Latin	Epic	
March 26	The Bees	Octopus	Indie rock	Virgin	
March 26	Brett Anderson	Brett Anderson	Alternative rock	Drowned in Sound	
March 26	The Field	From Here We Go Sublime	Techno	Kompakt	
March 26	Good Shoes	Think Before You Speak	Indie rock, post-punk revival	Brille	
March 26	Infected Mushroom	Vicious Delicious		YoYo Records	
March 26	Kelly Jones	Only the Names Have Been Changed	Pop	V2	
March 26	Madina Lake	From Them, Through Us, to You	Alternative rock, post-hardcore	Roadrunner	
March 27	Daphne Loves Derby	Good Night, Witness Light	Indie rock	Outlook Records	
March 27	Tha Dogg Pound	Dogg Chit	West Coast hip-hop, gangsta rap	Gangsta Advisory, Koch	
March 27	Good Charlotte	Good Morning Revival	Dance-punk, dance-rock, pop rock	Epic, Daylight	
March 27	Grant-Lee Phillips	Strangelet	Indie rock, Americana	Zoë	
March 27	Great Lake Swimmers	Ongiara	Folk rock	Nettwerk	
March 27	Jack Ingram	This Is It	Country	Big Machine	
March 27	Lil' Flip	I Need Mine	Hip-hop	Clover G, Asylum, Warner Bros.	
March 27	Machine Head	The Blackening	Thrash metal, groove metal	Roadrunner	
March 27	Mims	Music Is My Savior	East Coast hip-hop	American King Music, Capitol	
March 27	Ozomatli	Don't Mess with the Dragon		Concord	
March 27	Prodigy	Return of the Mac	Hip-hop	Koch	
March 27	Redman	Red Gone Wild: Thee Album	Hip-hop	Def Jam	
March 27	Tim McGraw	Let It Go	Country	Curb	
March 27	Young Buck	Buck the World	Crunk, gangsta rap, hardcore hip-hop	Cashville, G-Unit, Interscope	
March 30	Melanie C	This Time	Pop, pop rock	Red Girl, Warner	
March 31	Silverchair	Young Modern	Alternative rock, art rock	Eleven, Atlantic	

== Second quarter ==
=== April ===
List of albums released in April 2007
Go to: January | February | March | April | May | June | July | August | September | October | November | December | Back to top
Release date	Artist	Album	Genre	Label	Ref.
April 2	The Academy Is...	Santi	Pop-punk	Fueled by Ramen	
April 2	Da Weasel	Amor, Escárnio e Maldizer		Parlophone Portugal	
April 2	Kings of Leon	Because of the Times	Alternative rock	RCA	
April 2	Maxïmo Park	Our Earthly Pleasures	Alternative rock, indie rock, post-punk revival	Warp	
April 2	Poison the Well	Versions	Post-hardcore	Ferret Music	
April 2	Soulsavers	It's Not How Far You Fall, It's the Way You Land	Slowcore, trip hop	V2, Columbia, RED Ink	
April 2	Thirteen Senses	Contact	Alternative rock	Mercury	
April 2	Throbbing Gristle	Part Two: The Endless Not	Industrial	Mute	
April 2	Timbaland	Shock Value	Hip-hop	Mosley Music	
April 2	The Waterboys	Book of Lightning	Rock	Puck Records	
April 2	yourcodenameis:milo	They Came from the Sun	Post-hardcore	V2	
April 3	The Almost	Southern Weather	Emo	Tooth & Nail, Virgin	
April 3	The Chariot	The Fiancée	Hardcore, metalcore	Solid State	
April 3	Chevelle	Vena Sera	Alternative metal	Epic	
April 3	Fountains of Wayne	Traffic and Weather	Power pop	Virgin	
April 3	Martin Sexton	Seeds			
April 3	Martina McBride	Waking Up Laughing	Country	RCA Nashville	
April 3	Paul Wall	Get Money, Stay True	Southern hip-hop	Swishahouse, Asylum, Atlantic	
April 3	REO Speedwagon	Find Your Own Way Home	Rock, hard rock	Mailboat, Speedwagon Recordings	
April 3	See You Next Tuesday	Parasite	Mathcore, deathcore, grindcore	Ferret Music	
April 3	Shadows Fall	Threads of Life	Metalcore, death metal	Atlantic	
April 3	Sick Puppies	Dressed Up as Life	Alternative metal, post-grunge, hard rock	Virgin	
April 3	Static-X	Cannibal	Industrial metal, nu metal	Reprise	
April 3	Trap Them	Sleepwell Deconstructor	Grindcore, crust punk	Trash Art!	
April 3	Trouble	Simple Mind Condition	Doom metal	Escapi Music	
April 3	The Twilight Sad	Fourteen Autumns & Fifteen Winters	Indie rock, shoegaze	FatCat	
April 3	Various artists	Death Proof		A Band Apart, Maverick, Warner Bros.	
April 3	Vital Remains	Icons of Evil	Brutal death metal	Century Media	
April 6	Tiësto	Elements of Life	Trance	Magik Muzik, Black Hole	
April 8	The Game	You Know What It Is Vol. 4: Murda Game Chronicles		The Black Wall Street	
April 9	Bright Eyes	Cassadaga	Indie rock, indie folk, alternative country	Saddle Creek	
April 9	Cowboy Junkies	At the End of Paths Taken	Alternative country	Latent, Zoë	
April 9	Lucky Soul	The Great Unwanted	Indie pop	Ruffa Lane Records	
April 9	Marillion	Somewhere Else		Intact Records	
April 10	Blonde Redhead	23	Dream pop	4AD	
April 10	Brother Ali	The Undisputed Truth	Hip-hop	Rhymesayers, Warner	
April 10	Cloud Cult	The Meaning of 8	Indie pop		
April 10	CocoRosie	The Adventures of Ghosthorse and Stillborn	Freak folk	Touch and Go	
April 10	From Autumn to Ashes	Holding a Wolf by the Ears	Post-hardcore, emo, screamo	Vagrant	
April 10	Hellyeah	Hellyeah	Groove metal, alternative metal	Epic	
April 10	Nekromantix	Life Is a Grave & I Dig It!	Psychobilly	Hellcat	
April 10	William Parker and Hamid Drake	Summer Snow	Jazz	AUM Fidelity	
April 13	Lil Wayne	Da Drought 3	Hip-hop	Young Money, Cash Money	
April 13	No Angels	Destiny		Polydor, Universal	
April 16	Annihilator	Metal	Thrash metal, heavy metal	SPV/Steamhammer	
April 16	Maps	We Can Create	Indietronica, shoegaze, dream pop	Mute	
April 16	Mark Ronson	Version	Pop soul, funk, Motown sound	Allido, Columbia, Sony BMG	
April 16	Porcupine Tree	Fear of a Blank Planet	Progressive rock, progressive metal	Roadrunner, Atlantic	
April 16	W.A.S.P.	Dominator	Heavy metal	Demolition Records	
April 17	Avril Lavigne	The Best Damn Thing	Pop-punk	RCA	
April 17	Bucky Covington	Bucky Covington	Country	Lyric Street	
April 17	Clay Walker	Fall	Country	Asylum, Curb	
April 17	Joel Plaskett Emergency	Ashtray Rock	Indie rock	MapleMusic	
April 17	Joseph Arthur	Let's Just Be	Alternative rock	Lonely Astronaut, 14th Floor	
April 17	Lumidee	Unexpected	Hip-hop, R&B, reggae	TVT	
April 17	Nine Inch Nails	Year Zero	Industrial rock, electronic, digital hardcore	Interscope	
April 17	Patti Smith	Twelve	Rock	Columbia	
April 17	Serengeti & Polyphonic	Don't Give Up	Hip-hop	Audio 8 Recordings	
April 17	Six Feet Under	Commandment	Death metal	Metal Blade	
April 18	Arctic Monkeys	Favourite Worst Nightmare	Indie rock	Domino	
April 19	Dark Tranquillity	Fiction	Melodic death metal	Century Media	
April 21	Expatriate	In the Midst of This	Indie rock	Dew Process	
April 23	Dimmu Borgir	In Sorte Diaboli	Symphonic black metal	Nuclear Blast	
April 23	Feist	The Reminder	Indie pop	Arts & Crafts, Interscope, Polydor	
April 23	Keren Ann	Keren Ann		Delabel, EMI	
April 24	Avey Tare and Kría Brekkan	Pullhair Rubeye	Experimental	Paw Tracks	
April 24	Bill Callahan	Woke on a Whaleheart	Lo-fi	Drag City	
April 24	Colin Hay	Are You Lookin' at Me?	Rock, pop rock	Compass	
April 24	The Detroit Cobras	Tied & True		Bloodshot	
April 24	Dntel	Dumb Luck	Electronic	Sub Pop	
April 24	Joe	Ain't Nothin' Like Me		Jive	
April 24	Joshua Redman	Back East	Jazz	Nonesuch	
April 24	Marduk	Rom 5:12	Black metal	Regain	
April 24	Mavis Staples	We'll Never Turn Back	Gospel, soul, blues	Anti-	
April 24	The Nightwatchman	One Man Revolution	Folk rock, acoustic, anti-folk	Epic	
April 24	Thee More Shallows	Book of Bad Breaks	Indie rock	Anticon	
April 24	Yoko Ono	Open Your Box	House	Astralwerks	
April 25	Ne-Yo	Because of You	R&B, hip-hop soul, pop	Def Jam, Compound Entertainment	
April 25	Shout Out Louds	Our Ill Wills	Indie pop, indie rock	Haldern Pop, Merge, Dew Process	
April 27	Angélique Kidjo	Djin Djin	Afrobeat, reggae, worldbeat	Razor & Tie	
April 27	Black Rebel Motorcycle Club	Baby 81	Alternative rock, garage rock, post-punk revival	RCA, Island	
April 27	Hatesphere	Serpent Smiles and Killer Eyes	Death metal, thrash metal	SPV	
April 27	Natasha Bedingfield	N.B.	Pop	Phonogenic	
April 28	Missy Higgins	On a Clear Night	Acoustic, indie pop, Alternative rock	Eleven	
April 30	65daysofstatic	The Destruction of Small Ideas	Post-rock	Monotreme Records	
April 30	Basia Bulat	Oh, My Darling	Indie pop, folk	Rough Trade, Hardwood	
April 30	Ocean Colour Scene	On the Leyline	Rock	Moseley Shoals	

=== May ===
List of albums released in May 2007
Go to: January | February | March | April | May | June | July | August | September | October | November | December | Back to top
Release date	Artist	Album	Genre	Label	Ref.
May 1	Björk	Volta	Electropop	One Little Indian	
May 1	Building 429	Iris to Iris	Christian rock	Word	
May 1	Corbin Bleu	Another Side	Pop, teen pop, dance-pop	Hollywood	
May 1	Derek Webb	The Ringing Bell	Rock, CCM	INO	
May 1	Dinosaur Jr.	Beyond	Alternative rock, indie rock, noise rock	Fat Possum	
May 1	The Fall of Troy	Manipulator	Mathcore, post-hardcore	Equal Vision	
May 1	Frog Eyes	Tears of the Valedictorian	Indie rock	Absolutely Kosher	
May 1	Jon McLaughlin	Indiana	Pop rock	Island Def Jam	
May 1	Kimberley Locke	Based on a True Story	Pop, R&B	Curb	
May 1	Michael Bublé	Call Me Irresponsible	Vocal jazz	Reprise	
May 1	Miranda Lambert	Crazy Ex-Girlfriend	Country	Columbia Nashville	
May 1	Rush	Snakes & Arrows	Progressive rock, hard rock	Anthem	
May 1	Tori Amos	American Doll Posse		Epic	
May 1	Tub Ring	The Great Filter	Experimental rock	The End	
May 4	Dolores O'Riordan	Are You Listening?	Alternative rock, pop rock, hard rock	Sequel Records, Sanctuary	
May 4	Groove Armada	Soundboy Rock		Columbia	
May 7	Beverley Knight	Music City Soul	Gospel, soul	Parlophone	
May 7	The Cinematic Orchestra	Ma Fleur		Ninja Tune, Domino	
May 7	Manic Street Preachers	Send Away the Tigers	Hard rock, glam rock	Columbia	
May 7	Travis	The Boy with No Name	Indie pop, alternative rock	Independiente, Epic	
May 8	Alias	Collected Remixes	Alternative hip-hop	Anticon	
May 8	The Bad Plus	Prog	Jazz	Heads Up	
May 8	Barbra Streisand	Live in Concert 2006		Columbia	
May 8	Becoming the Archetype	The Physics of Fire	Progressive death metal, metalcore	Solid State	
May 8	Bobby Valentino	Special Occasion	R&B	Disturbing tha Peace, Def Jam	
May 8	Bone Thugs-n-Harmony	Strength & Loyalty	Hip-hop, gangsta rap, R&B	Full Surface, Interscope	
May 8	Chromeo	Fancy Footwork	Electro-funk, nu-disco	Turbo, Last Gang	
May 8	The Clientele	God Save The Clientele	Indie pop	Merge, Track & Field	
May 8	Dan Deacon	Spiderman of the Rings	Electronica, noise	Carpark	
May 8	Deerhunter	Fluorescent Grey	Indie rock	Kranky	
May 8	DJ Jazzy Jeff	The Return of the Magnificent	Hip-hop	Barely Breaking Even, Rapster Records	
May 8	Elliott Smith	New Moon	Indie folk, indie rock, lo-fi	Kill Rock Stars	
May 8	Ike Reilly Assassination	We Belong to the Staggering Evening		Rock Ridge	
May 8	Neurosis	Given to the Rising	Post-metal, sludge metal	Neurot	
May 8	Newsboys	GO Remixed	Christian rock, pop rock	Inpop	
May 8	Paris Bennett	Princess P		306 Entertainment, TVT	
May 8	Rush of Fools	Rush of Fools	Christian rock, indie rock	Midas	
May 8	Sage Francis	Human the Death Dance	Hip-hop	Epitaph	
May 8	The Sea and Cake	Everybody	Indie rock	Thrill Jockey	
May 8	Various artists	Our Impact Will Be Felt	Hardcore, heavy metal	Abacus	
May 11	Amerie	Because I Love It	R&B	Columbia	
May 14	Battles	Mirrored	Math rock	Warp	
May 14	Erasure	Light at the End of the World	Synth-pop	Mute	
May 14	Funeral for a Friend	Tales Don't Tell Themselves	Alternative rock, post-hardcore	Atlantic	
May 14	Linkin Park	Minutes to Midnight	Alternative rock, alternative metal	Warner Bros., Machine Shop	
May 14	Scorpions	Humanity: Hour I	Hard rock, heavy metal	RCA, Sony BMG	
May 15	The Angelic Process	Weighing Souls with Sand	Drone metal, ambient, shoegaze	Profound Lore	
May 15	The Avett Brothers	Emotionalism	Folk rock	Ramseur Records	
May 15	Balkan Beat Box	Nu Med		JDub, Crammed Discs	
May 15	Dance Gavin Dance	Downtown Battle Mountain	Post-hardcore, math rock	Rise	
May 15	The Exies	A Modern Way of Living with the Truth	Alternative rock, alternative metal, hard rock	Eleven Seven Music	
May 15	Gretchen Wilson	One of the Boys	Country	Columbia Nashville	
May 15	Hopesfall	Magnetic North	Post-hardcore, alternative rock, space rock	Trustkill	
May 15	Job for a Cowboy	Genesis	Death metal	Metal Blade	
May 15	Megadeth	United Abominations	Thrash metal	Roadrunner	
May 15	Ozma	Pasadena	Indie pop, pop-punk	About A Girl Records, Reincarnate	
May 15	Pink Martini	Hey Eugene!	Alternative pop, world, Latin	Heinz	
May 15	Rufus Wainwright	Release the Stars	Baroque pop	Geffen	
May 15	They Might Be Giants	The Else	Alternative rock	Idlewild, Zoë	
May 15	Wilco	Sky Blue Sky	Alternative rock, folk rock, alternative country	Nonesuch	
May 16	Maroon 5	It Won't Be Soon Before Long	Disco, funk rock, blue-eyed soul	A&M Octone	
May 18	Planet X	Quantum	Instrumental rock, progressive metal, progressive rock	Inside Out	
May 18	Sophie Ellis-Bextor	Trip the Light Fantastic	Pop, dance-pop	Fascination	
May 21	The Cribs	Men's Needs, Women's Needs, Whatever	Britpop, indie rock	Wichita, Warner Bros.	
May 21	Devin Townsend	Ziltoid the Omniscient	Progressive metal	HevyDevy	
May 21	Gary Moore	Close as You Get	Blues, blues rock	Eagle	
May 21	Paradise Lost	In Requiem	Gothic metal, doom metal	Century Media	
May 21	Tim Armstrong	A Poet's Life	Ska, reggae	Hellcat, Epitaph	
May 22	Amber Pacific	Truth in Sincerity	Pop-punk, emo	Hopeless	
May 22	Black Moth Super Rainbow	Dandelion Gum	Indietronica	Graveface	
May 22	The Bravery	The Sun and the Moon	Indie rock, post-punk revival	Island	
May 22	Britt Nicole	Say It	Christian rock	Sparrow	
May 22	The Dear Hunter	Act II: The Meaning of, and All Things Regarding Ms. Leading	Progressive rock, indie rock, experimental rock	Triple Crown	
May 22	Despised Icon	The Ills of Modern Man	Deathcore	Century Media	
May 22	Glen Hansard, Markéta Irglová and Interference	Once (Music from the Motion Picture)	Folk rock	Columbia	
May 22	Handsome Furs	Plague Park	Indie rock	Sub Pop	
May 22	Joan Osborne	Breakfast in Bed	R&B, pop	Time Life	
May 22	KRS-One and Marley Marl	Hip Hop Lives	East Coast hip-hop, hardcore hip-hop	Koch	
May 22	Loudon Wainwright III	Strange Weirdos: Music from and Inspired by the Film Knocked Up	Contemporary folk, folk rock, Americana	Concord	
May 22	Miracle Fortress	Five Roses	Indie rock	Secret City	
May 22	The National	Boxer	Indie rock, post-punk revival	Beggars Banquet	
May 22	Ozzy Osbourne	Black Rain	Heavy metal	Epic	
May 22	Parts & Labor	Mapmaker	Noise rock	Jagjaguwar, Brah Records	
May 22	Stars	Do You Trust Your Friends?	Indie pop, indie rock	Arts & Crafts	
May 22	U.S.D.A	Cold Summer	Southern hip-hop, gangsta rap, hardcore hip-hop	CTE, Def Jam	
May 22	The Used	Lies for the Liars	Post-hardcore	Reprise	
May 22	Voxtrot	Voxtrot	Indie pop, indie rock	Playlouderecordings, Beggars Group	
May 23	Hilltop Hoods	The Hard Road: Restrung	Australian hip-hop	Obese	
May 25	Caliban	The Awakening	Metalcore	Roadrunner, Century Media	
May 25	Sonata Arctica	Unia	Power metal, symphonic metal, progressive metal	Nuclear Blast	
May 25	Visions of Atlantis	Trinity	Symphonic power metal	Napalm, SPV	
May 27	Kanye West	Can't Tell Me Nothing	Hip-hop	GOOD, Roc-A-Fella, Def Jam	
May 28	3 Inches of Blood	Fire Up the Blades	Heavy metal, power metal, thrash metal	Roadrunner	
May 28	Akercocke	Antichrist	Blackened death metal, progressive metal	Earache	
May 28	Chris Cornell	Carry On	Alternative rock	Suretone, Interscope	
May 28	Mumm-Ra	These Things Move in Threes	Indie rock, alternative rock, post-punk revival	Columbia	
May 28	Paul Hartnoll	The Ideal Condition	Electronica	ACP Recordings	
May 28	The Pigeon Detectives	Wait for Me	Indie rock, post-punk revival	Dance to the Radio, V2	
May 28	Richard Thompson	Sweet Warrior	Folk rock, contemporary folk	Proper, The Planet Company, Shout! Factory, P-Vine	
May 29	Cephalic Carnage	Xenosapien	Deathgrind	Relapse	
May 29	Circa Survive	On Letting Go	Emo, progressive rock, experimental rock	Equal Vision	
May 29	The Gaslight Anthem	Sink or Swim	Punk rock	XOXO Records	
May 29	Immaculate Machine	Immaculate Machine's Fables	Indie rock	Mint	
May 29	Jason Aldean	Relentless	Country	Broken Bow	
May 29	R. Kelly	Double Up	R&B, hip-hop	Jive, Zomba	
May 29	Satellite Party	Ultra Payloaded	Alternative rock, electronica	Columbia	
May 31	Buckethead	Acoustic Shards	Acoustic	Avabella Records	
May 31	Rihanna	Good Girl Gone Bad	Pop, dance-pop	Def Jam	

=== June ===
List of albums released in June 2007
Go to: January | February | March | April | May | June | July | August | September | October | November | December | Back to top
Release date	Artist	Album	Genre	Label	Ref.
June 1	Kamelot	Ghost Opera	Power metal, progressive metal, symphonic metal	SPV/Steamhammer	
June 1	Tokio Hotel	Scream	Alternative rock	Cherrytree, Island, Interscope	
June 2	Powderfinger	Dream Days at the Hotel Existence	Rock	Universal	
June 2	Xavier Rudd	White Moth	Blues, roots, Alternative rock	Anti-	
June 4	Biffy Clyro	Puzzle	Alternative rock	14th Floor	
June 4	Deborah Cox	Destination Moon	R&B, jazz	Decca	
June 4	Dizzee Rascal	Maths + English	Grime, hip-hop	XL, Matador, Definitive Jux	
June 4	Dream Theater	Systematic Chaos	Progressive metal, progressive rock	Roadrunner	
June 4	Mutya Buena	Real Girl	Pop, R&B	Island	
June 4	Paul McCartney	Memory Almost Full	Rock	Hear Music	
June 4	The Twang	Love It When I Feel Like This	Indie rock	B-Unique	
June 4	Wiley	Playtime Is Over	Grime, eskibeat	Big Dada	
June 5	Aaron Shust	Whispered and Shouted	CCM, Christian rock	Brash Music	
June 5	The Aggrolites	Reggae Hit L.A.	Reggae	Hellcat	
June 5	Big & Rich	Between Raising Hell and Amazing Grace	Country, country rock, country rap	Warner Bros. Nashville	
June 5	Black Light Burns	Cruel Melody	Industrial rock, alternative rock, alternative metal	I AM: WOLFPACK	
June 5	Bruce Springsteen	Bruce Springsteen with The Sessions Band: Live in Dublin	Americana	Columbia	
June 5	Daddy Yankee	El Cartel: The Big Boss	Hip-hop	El Cartel, Interscope	
June 5	Ion Dissonance	Minus the Herd	Mathcore, deathcore	Abacus	
June 5	Marilyn Manson	Eat Me, Drink Me	Gothic rock	Interscope	
June 5	Matthew Dear	Asa Breed	Electronic	Ghostly International	
June 5	Nocturnal Rites	The 8th Sin	Power metal	Century Media	
June 5	Pelican	City of Echoes	Post-metal, post-rock	Hydra Head	
June 5	Poison	Poison'd!	Hard rock, glam metal	EMI	
June 5	Praxis	Tennessee 2004	Acid rock, dub, experimental metal	ROIR	
June 5	Shellac	Excellent Italian Greyhound	Noise rock, post-hardcore, math rock	Touch and Go	
June 5	T-Pain	Epiphany	Hip-hop	Nappy Boy, Konvict Muzik, Jive	
June 5	Tesla	Real to Reel	Hard rock, blues rock	Tesla Electric Company Recordings, Ryko	
June 5	Tiger Army	Music from Regions Beyond	Psychobilly, cowpunk	Hellcat	
June 8	Bon Jovi	Lost Highway	Country rock	Island	
June 11	Enrique Iglesias	Insomniac	Pop	Interscope	
June 11	John Doe	A Year in the Wilderness		Yep Roc	
June 11	Justice	Cross	Electro house	Ed Banger, Because Music	
June 12	Blitzen Trapper	Wild Mountain Nation	Alternative country	Sub Pop	
June 12	Blue Scholars	Bayani	Alternative hip-hop	Mass Line Media, Rawkus, Duck Down	
June 12	DJ Khaled	We the Best	Hip-hop	Terror Squad, Koch	
June 12	Fabolous	From Nothin' to Somethin'	Hip-hop	Desert Storm, Def Jam	
June 12	Fair to Midland	Fables from a Mayfly: What I Tell You Three Times Is True	Alternative metal	Serjical Strike, Universal Republic	
June 12	Municipal Waste	The Art of Partying	Crossover thrash, thrash metal	Earache	
June 12	Paramore	Riot!	Alternative rock	Fueled by Ramen	
June 12	Paula Cole	Courage	Rock	Decca	
June 12	Queens of the Stone Age	Era Vulgaris	Alternative rock, desert rock, hard rock	Interscope, Rekords Rekords	
June 12	Strung Out	Blackhawks Over Los Angeles	Skate punk	Fat Wreck Chords	
June 12	Toby Keith	Big Dog Daddy	Country	Show Dog Nashville	
June 12	Various artists	Instant Karma: The Amnesty International Campaign to Save Darfur	Pop, rock	Warner Bros., Amnesty International, Art for Amnesty	
June 15	Calvin Harris	I Created Disco	EDM, dance-pop	Fly Eye, Columbia	
June 15	The White Stripes	Icky Thump	Garage rock, alternative rock, punk blues	Third Man, Warner Bros.	
June 18	Art Brut	It's a Bit Complicated	Indie rock, garage punk, garage rock	Mute	
June 18	Chrisette Michele	I Am Chrisette Michele	R&B, jazz, soul	Def Jam	
June 18	David Guetta	Pop Life	House, electro house	Virgin	
June 18	Lifehouse	Who We Are	Alternative rock, pop rock, post-grunge	Geffen	
June 18	Mandy Moore	Wild Hope	Folk pop	EMI USA, Firm Music	
June 18	Meat Puppets	Rise to Your Knees	Alternative rock	Anodyne	
June 18	Simian Mobile Disco	Attack Decay Sustain Release	Electro house, tech house	Wichita, Interscope	
June 18	Sinéad O'Connor	Theology	Rock	Rubyworks, Koch	
June 19	Ana Popović	Still Making History	Blues, blues rock, soul blues	Eclecto Groove	
June 19	August Burns Red	Messengers	Melodic metalcore	Solid State, CI	
June 19	Brad Paisley	5th Gear	Country	Arista Nashville	
June 19	Huey	Notebook Paper	Hip-hop	Hitz Committee, Jive	
June 19	The Mooney Suzuki	Have Mercy	Garage rock	Elixia Records	
June 19	Oxbow	The Narcotic Story		Hydra Head	
June 19	The Polyphonic Spree	The Fragile Army	Psychedelic pop	TVT, Good	
June 19	Project 86	Rival Factions		Tooth & Nail	
June 19	Rasheeda	Dat Type of Gurl	Crunk, dirty rap, Southern hip-hop	Imperial	
June 19	Shop Boyz	Rockstar Mentality	Southern hip-hop, rap rock	Universal Republic	
June 19	Straylight Run	The Needles the Space	Indie rock	Universal	
June 19	Tomahawk	Anonymous	Native American music, experimental rock	Ipecac	
June 20	Kelly Rowland	Ms. Kelly	R&B	Columbia	
June 21	Andrea Corr	Ten Feet High	Pop, electropop	Atlantic	
June 22	Kelly Clarkson	My December	Alternative rock, hard rock, pop rock	RCA	
June 23	Airbourne	Runnin' Wild	Hard rock	Capitol, Roadrunner	
June 25	Editors	An End Has a Start	Indie rock	Kitchenware	
June 25	Reuben	In Nothing We Trust		Hideous Records, Big Scary Monsters	
June 25	Shirley Bassey	Get the Party Started	Pop	Lock Stock and Barrel Records	
June 25	Siobhán Donaghy	Ghosts	Electropop, trip hop, dream pop	Parlophone	
June 25	The Tuss	Rushup Edge	Electronic, acid techno, drill and bass	Rephlex	
June 26	Bad Brains	Build a Nation	Hardcore punk, reggae	Megaforce	
June 26	Beastie Boys	The Mix-Up	Instrumental rock	Capitol	
June 26	Boys Night Out	Boys Night Out	Emo, post-hardcore, pop-punk	Ferret Music	
June 26	The Click Five	Modern Minds and Pastimes	Power pop	Lava, Atlantic, WEA International	
June 26	Grateful Dead	Three from the Vault	Rock	Rhino	
June 26	Metric	Grow Up and Blow Away	Indie rock, post-punk revival	Last Gang	
June 26	Miley Cyrus	Hannah Montana 2: Meet Miley Cyrus	Pop rock	Walt Disney	
June 26	Nick Lowe	At My Age	Rock	Proper, Yep Roc	
June 26	Pharoahe Monch	Desire	Hip-hop	SRC	
June 26	Pierce the Veil	A Flair for the Dramatic	Post-hardcore, emo, screamo	Equal Vision	
June 26	Rasputina	Oh Perilous World		Filthy Bonnet	
June 26	Ryan Adams	Easy Tiger	Alternative country, rock	Lost Highway	
June 26	Steve Vai with Metropole Orkest	Sound Theories Vol. I & II	Instrumental rock, symphonic rock	Epic, Red Ink	
June 26	Symphony X	Paradise Lost	Progressive metal, neoclassical metal, power metal	Inside Out	
June 26	Trio of Doom	Trio of Doom	Jazz fusion	Columbia	
June 26	Various artists	Transformers: The Album	Alternative rock, alternative metal	Warner Bros.	
June 27	Kula Shaker	Strangefolk	Psychedelic rock	Strange F.O.L.K. Records, Cooking Vinyl	
June 29	Crowded House	Time on Earth	Pop rock, jangle pop, soft rock	ATO	

== Third quarter ==
=== July ===
List of albums released in July 2007
Go to: January | February | March | April | May | June | July | August | September | October | November | December | Back to top
Release date	Artist	Album	Genre	Label	Ref.
July 2	Ash	Twilight of the Innocents	Pop, power pop	Infectious	
July 2	The Chemical Brothers	We Are the Night	Electronica	Freestyle Dust, Virgin, Astralwerks	
July 2	Happy Mondays	Uncle Dysfunktional	Electro-funk	Sequel Records	
July 2	Silverstein	Arrivals & Departures	Post-hardcore, emo	Victory	
July 3	Sara Bareilles	Little Voice	Pop	Epic	
July 3	T.I.	T.I. vs. T.I.P.	Hip-hop	Grand Hustle, Atlantic	
July 3	Velvet Revolver	Libertad	Hard rock	RCA	
July 6	New Young Pony Club	Fantastic Playroom	Electropop, new wave	Island	
July 8	Bon Iver	For Emma, Forever Ago	Indie folk	Jagjaguwar	
July 9	Buffalo Tom	Three Easy Pieces	Alternative rock	New West	
July 9	Cherry Ghost	Thirst for Romance	Indie rock, chamber pop	Heavenly	
July 9	The Enemy	We'll Live and Die in These Towns	Indie rock, punk rock	Warner Bros.	
July 10	Against Me!	New Wave	Punk rock, emo	Sire	
July 10	Aly & AJ	Insomniatic	Electronic rock	Hollywood	
July 10	Bad Religion	New Maps of Hell	Melodic hardcore, skate punk	Epitaph	
July 10	Colbie Caillat	Coco	Pop, pop rock, folk pop	Universal Republic	
July 10	Darkest Hour	Deliver Us	Melodic death metal, metalcore	Victory	
July 10	Gogol Bordello	Super Taranta!	Gypsy punk	SideOneDummy	
July 10	Interpol	Our Love to Admire	Indie rock, post-punk revival	Capitol, Parlophone	
July 10	Jason Isbell	Sirens of the Ditch	Alternative country	New West	
July 10	Mayday Parade	A Lesson in Romantics	Pop-punk	Fearless	
July 10	Reel Big Fish	Monkeys for Nothin' and the Chimps for Free	Ska punk	Rock Ridge	
July 10	The Smashing Pumpkins	Zeitgeist	Alternative rock, hard rock, alternative metal	Martha's Music, Reprise	
July 10	Spoon	Ga Ga Ga Ga Ga	Indie rock, art rock, post-punk revival	Merge, Anti-	
July 10	St. Vincent	Marry Me	Indie pop, chamber pop, art rock	Beggars Banquet	
July 10	Stars	In Our Bedroom After the War	Indie pop, baroque pop, art rock	Arts & Crafts	
July 10	Ulrich Schnauss	Goodbye	Shoegaze, new-age	Independiente, Domino	
July 10	Various artists	Hairspray	Traditional pop, rock and roll, swing	New Line	
July 14	Urthboy	The Signal	Australian hip-hop	Elefant Traks	
July 15	Prince	Planet Earth	R&B, pop, funk, rock	NPG, Columbia	
July 16	Danny!	Danny Is Dead	Hip-hop	1911 Music, Badenov Records	
July 16	Deathspell Omega	Fas – Ite, Maledicti, in Ignem Aeternum	Black metal, avant-garde metal	Norma Evangelium Diaboli, The Ajna Offensive	
July 16	Future Loop Foundation	Memories from a Fading Room	Downtempo, ambient	Louisiana Recordings	
July 16	Motörhead	Better Motörhead than Dead: Live at Hammersmith		SPV GmbH	
July 16	MxPx	Secret Weapon	Skate punk, punk rock	Tooth & Nail	
July 17	Behemoth	The Apostasy	Blackened death metal	Regain, Century Media, Mystic	
July 17	Blu & Exile	Below the Heavens	Hip-hop	Sound in Color	
July 17	DJ Mayonnaise	Still Alive	Hip-hop	Anticon	
July 17	Kim Mitchell	Ain't Life Amazing	Rock	Alert, Koch	
July 17	Malevolent Creation	Doomsday X	Death metal	Nuclear Blast, Massacre	
July 17	Nile	Ithyphallic	Technical death metal	Nuclear Blast	
July 17	Rooney	Calling the World	Alternative rock	Geffen	
July 17	The Rocket Summer	Do You Feel	Pop rock, power pop, pop-punk	Island	
July 17	Strata	Strata Presents The End of the World	Alternative rock, post-grunge	Wind-up	
July 17	Suzanne Vega	Beauty & Crime	Folk rock, pop	Blue Note	
July 17	Yellowcard	Paper Walls	Pop-punk	Capitol	
July 18	Sum 41	Underclass Hero	Pop-punk, emo	Aquarius, Island	
July 21	Awol One and Factor Chandelier	Only Death Can Kill You	Hip-hop	Cornerstone R.A.S.	
July 21	Grinspoon	Alibis & Other Lies	Post-grunge, alternative rock, blues rock	Universal	
July 22	The Thrills	Teenager	Indie rock	Virgin	
July 24	BarlowGirl	How Can We Be Silent	Christian rock, melodic rock	Fervent	
July 24	Billy Ray Cyrus	Home at Last	Country	Walt Disney	
July 24	Emily Haines and the Soft Skeleton	What Is Free to a Good Home?	Indie pop	Last Gang	
July 24	Evergreen Terrace	Wolfbiker	Melodic hardcore, metalcore	Metal Blade	
July 24	Freekey Zekey	Book of Ezekiel	Hip-hop	Diplomatic Man, Asylum	
July 24	Hans Zimmer	The Simpsons Movie: The Music		Gracie Films, 20th Century Fox, Fox Music	
July 24	John Vanderslice	Emerald City	Indie rock	Barsuk	
July 24	The Red Chord	Prey for Eyes	Deathcore, grindcore, technical death metal	Metal Blade	
July 24	Tegan and Sara	The Con	Indie rock	Vapor Records	
July 24	Trey Anastasio	The Horseshoe Curve	Jazz	Rubber Jungle	
July 24	Yeah Yeah Yeahs	Is Is	Indie rock, art punk, garage punk	Interscope, Polydor, Modular	
July 25	Pepe Deluxé	Spare Time Machine	Psychedelic rock	Catskills	
July 27	Clawfinger	Life Will Kill You	Industrial metal, rap metal	Nuclear Blast	
July 27	Doda	Diamond Bitch	Pop rock	Universal Music Polska	
July 28	Architecture in Helsinki	Places Like This	Indie pop	Polyvinyl	
July 31	Bomb the Music Industry!	Get Warmer	Ska punk, indie rock, power pop	Quote Unquote	
July 31	Common	Finding Forever	Hip-hop, neo soul	GOOD, Geffen	
July 31	DevilDriver	The Last Kind Words	Groove metal, melodic death metal	Roadrunner	
July 31	Five Finger Death Punch	The Way of the Fist	Heavy metal, thrash metal, groove metal	Firm, Spinefarm	
July 31	Keith Murray	Rap-Murr-Phobia (The Fear of Real Hip-Hop)	Hip-hop	Koch	
July 31	Korn	Untitled	Nu metal	EMI, Virgin	
July 31	Mandisa	True Beauty	Gospel, CCM, R&B	Sparrow	
July 31	Oh No	Dr. No's Oxperiment	Hip-hop, trip hop	Stones Throw	
July 31	Sean Kingston	Sean Kingston	R&B, reggae fusion, hip-hop	Beluga Heights, Epic, Koch	
July 31	The Send	Cosmos	Alternative rock	Tooth & Nail	
July 31	Sharkey and C-Rayz Walz	Monster Maker	Hip-hop	Babygrande	
July 31	The Starting Line	Direction	Pop-punk, pop rock, power pop	Virgin	
July 31	Whitechapel	The Somatic Defilement	Deathcore	Candlelight	

=== August ===
List of albums released in August 2007
Go to: January | February | March | April | May | June | July | August | September | October | November | December | Back to top
Release date	Artist	Album	Genre	Label	Ref.
August 6	Kate Nash	Made of Bricks	Pop	Fiction, Cherrytree Records, Universal Music	
August 7	Apparat	Walls	Electronic, dream pop	Shitkatapult	
August 7	Boyz n da Hood	Back Up n da Chevy	Southern hip-hop	Bad Boy South, Block, Atlantic	
August 7	Buck-O-Nine	Sustain	Ska punk	Asian Man, Stomp, Dude Records	
August 7	Drowning Pool	Full Circle	Post-grunge, alternative metal	Eleven Seven Music	
August 7	Flight of the Conchords	The Distant Future	Comedy rock	Sub Pop	
August 7	Fuel	Angels & Devils	Alternative rock, post-grunge	Epic	
August 7	Jonas Brothers	Jonas Brothers	Pop-punk	Hollywood	
August 7	Kat DeLuna	9 Lives	Dance-pop, dancehall	Epic	
August 7	Okkervil River	The Stage Names	Indie rock	Jagjaguwar	
August 7	Plies	The Real Testament	Southern hip-hop, dirty rap, gangsta rap	Big Gates, Slip-n-Slide, Atlantic	
August 7	Public Enemy	How You Sell Soul to a Soulless People Who Sold Their Soul?	Political hip-hop, hardcore hip-hop	SlamJamz, Redeye	
August 7	Slightly Stoopid	Chronchitis	Reggae, rocksteady, dub	Controlled Substance Sound Labs, Powerslave Records	
August 7	Throwdown	Venom & Tears	Groove metal	Trustkill	
August 7	UGK	Underground Kingz	Hip-hop	Jive	
August 7	Yakuza	Transmutations	Avant-garde metal, progressive metal	Prosthetic	
August 8	Alcest	Souvenirs d'un autre monde	Shoegaze, post-metal, blackgaze	Prophecy Productions	
August 8	M.I.A.	Kala	EDM, world, hip-hop	XL, Interscope	
August 14	The Agonist	Once Only Imagined	Metalcore, melodic death metal	Century Media	
August 14	Ali & Gipp	Kinfolk	Hip-hop	Derrty, Universal Motown	
August 14	Arsonists Get All the Girls	The Game of Life	Progressive deathcore	Century Media	
August 14	As Cities Burn	Come Now Sleep	Indie rock, post-hardcore, emo	Tooth & Nail, Solid State	
August 14	Bill Frisell, Matt Chamberlain, Lee Townsend, Tucker Martine	Floratone	Jazz	Blue Note	
August 14	Blaqk Audio	CexCells	Synth-pop, futurepop, EBM	Interscope	
August 14	Boot Camp Clik	Casualties of War	Hip-hop	Duck Down	
August 14	Dave Matthews & Tim Reynolds	Live at Radio City	Rock	RCA	
August 14	Eisley	Combinations		Reprise	
August 14	LA Symphony	Unleashed	Hip-hop, Christian hip-hop	Syntax Records	
August 14	Lori McKenna	Unglamorous	Country	Warner Bros., StyleSonic Records	
August 14	Luke Bryan	I'll Stay Me	Country	Capitol Nashville	
August 14	Mae	Singularity	Power pop	Capitol, Tooth & Nail	
August 14	Terence Blanchard	A Tale of God's Will (A Requiem for Katrina)	Jazz	Blue Note	
August 14	Various artists	High School Musical 2: The Soundtrack	Pop, teen pop, dance-pop	Walt Disney	
August 17	Caribou	Andorra	Psychedelic pop, electronica, neo-psychedelia	City Slang, Merge	
August 17	Rilo Kiley	Under the Blacklight	Indie pop	Warner Bros.	
August 20	Aiden	Conviction	Pop rock, pop-punk	Victory	
August 20	Idiot Pilot	Wolves	Alternative rock, indie rock	Reprise	
August 20	Minus the Bear	Planet of Ice	Indie rock, experimental rock, progressive rock	Suicide Squeeze	
August 20	Rachel Unthank and the Winterset	The Bairns	Folk	EMI, Shock, Real World	
August 20	Richard Hawley	Lady's Bridge	Alternative pop, chamber pop	Mute	
August 21	As I Lay Dying	An Ocean Between Us	Metalcore	Metal Blade	
August 21	Bedouin Soundclash	Street Gospels	Rock, reggae	Dine Alone, SideOneDummy	
August 21	Cartel	Cartel	Power pop	Epic	
August 21	Dax Riggs	We Sing of Only Blood or Love	Blues rock, alternative rock	Fat Possum	
August 21	The Devil Wears Prada	Plagues	Metalcore	Rise	
August 21	Imperial Teen	The Hair the TV the Baby & the Band	Indie rock, indie pop	Merge	
August 21	Joe Nichols	Real Things	Country	Universal South	
August 21	Josh Ritter	The Historical Conquests of Josh Ritter	Folk rock, Americana	Sony BMG, V2	
August 21	KMFDM	Tohuvabohu	Industrial rock, industrial metal, EBM	Metropolis, KMFDM Records	
August 21	Madball	Infiltrate the System	Hardcore punk	Ferret Music	
August 21	The Mekons	Natural	Post-punk, alternative country	Quarterstick	
August 21	The New Pornographers	Challengers	Indie rock	Matador	
August 21	Operator	Soulcrusher	Hard rock	Atlantic	
August 21	Sham 69	Hollywood Hero	Punk rock	SOS	
August 21	Sixx:A.M.	The Heroin Diaries Soundtrack	Hard rock, alternative metal, symphonic metal	Eleven Seven Music	
August 21	Swizz Beatz	One Man Band Man	Hip-hop	Full Surface, Universal Motown	
August 21	Talib Kweli	Eardrum	Alternative hip-hop	Blacksmith, Warner Bros.	
August 21	Through the Eyes of the Dead	Malice	Melodic death metal	Prosthetic	
August 21	Travis Morrison Hellfighters	All Y'all	Indie rock	Barsuk	
August 22	Dimension Zero	He Who Shall Not Bleed	Melodic death metal	Toy's Factory, Vic Records, Candlelight	
August 22	Epica	The Divine Conspiracy	Symphonic metal	Nuclear Blast	
August 24	Janelle Monáe	Metropolis: The Chase Suite		Bad Boy	
August 25	Divine Heresy	Bleed the Fifth	Metalcore	Century Media	
August 27	Collective Soul	Afterwords	Alternative rock	El Music	
August 27	Evile	Enter the Grave	Thrash metal	Earache	
August 27	Hard-Fi	Once Upon a Time in the West	Indie rock	Warner Music	
August 27	Obituary	Xecutioner's Return	Death metal	Candlelight	
August 27	The Orb	The Dream	Electronic	Liquid Sound Design, Traffic Inc., Six Degrees	
August 27	Procol Harum	Secrets of the Hive	Progressive rock	Union Square Music	
August 27	Super Furry Animals	Hey Venus!	Indie rock	Rough Trade	
August 27	Tunng	Good Arrows	Folktronica	Full Time Hobby, Thrill Jockey	
August 27	Vanessa Paradis	Divinidylle	Pop, rock	Barclay	
August 28	Aesop Rock	None Shall Pass	Hip-hop	Definitive Jux	
August 28	Anoushka Shankar and Karsh Kale	Breathing Under Water	World	Manhattan	
August 28	Atreyu	Lead Sails Paper Anchor	Alternative metal	Hollywood	
August 28	Audio Adrenaline	Live from Hawaii: The Farewell Concert	Christian rock	ForeFront	
August 28	Ben Harper	Lifeline	Rock, blues rock, pop rock	Virgin	
August 28	Casting Crowns	The Altar and the Door	Christian rock	Beach Street, Reunion	
August 28	Chromatics	Night Drive	Synth-pop	Italians Do It Better	
August 28	The Honorary Title	Scream & Light Up the Sky	Indie rock, alternative rock	Doghouse, Reprise	
August 28	Horse the Band	A Natural Death	Nintendocore, noise rock, hardcore punk	Koch	
August 28	The Last Goodnight	Poison Kiss		Virgin	
August 28	Ledisi	Lost & Found	R&B	Verve	
August 28	Liars	Liars	Experimental rock	Mute	
August 28	Needtobreathe	The Heat	Christian rock, Southern rock	Atlantic, Lava	
August 28	N.O.R.E.	Noreality	Hip-hop	Babygrande	
August 28	Northern State	Can I Keep This Pen?	Alternative hip-hop, indie rock	Ipecac	
August 28	Odd Nosdam	Level Live Wires	Hip-hop	Anticon	
August 28	Pavlov's Dog	Has Anyone Here Seen Sigfried?	Progressive rock, art rock	Rockville Music	
August 28	Robbie Seay Band	Give Yourself Away	CCM	Sparrow	
August 28	Scary Kids Scaring Kids	Scary Kids Scaring Kids	Post-hardcore, emo, metalcore	Immortal	
August 28	Shane & Shane	Pages	Contemporary worship	Inpop	
August 28	VHS or Beta	Bring On the Comets	Electronic	Astralwerks	
August 28	Yung Joc	Hustlenomics	Southern hip-hop	Bad Boy South	
August 30	Manu Chao	La Radiolina	Latin alternative, rock	Because	

=== September ===
List of albums released in September 2007
Go to: January | February | March | April | May | June | July | August | September | October | November | December | Back to top
Release date	Artist	Album	Genre	Label	Ref.
September 3	Athlete	Beyond the Neighbourhood	Electronica, rock	Parlophone	
September 3	The Proclaimers	Life with You	Rock	W14 Music, Universal	
September 4	Baroness	Red Album	Progressive metal, sludge metal	Relapse	
September 4	Chiodos	Bone Palace Ballet	Post-hardcore	Equal Vision, Warner Bros.	
September 4	Deer Tick	War Elephant	Indie rock, alternative country	FEOW! Records	
September 4	Every Time I Die	The Big Dirty	Metalcore	Ferret Music	
September 4	Impending Doom	Nailed. Dead. Risen.	Brutal death metal, Christian metal, grindcore	Facedown	
September 4	Jars of Clay	Live Monsters	Christian rock	Essential	
September 4	Miller Boyz (Master P & Romeo Miller)	Hip Hop History	Southern hip-hop	Take A Stand, UrbanDigital, GoDigital	
September 4	The Perishers	Victorious	Indie rock	Nettwerk	
September 4	Ted Nugent	Love Grenade	Hard rock, heavy metal	Eagle	
September 4	Tickle Me Pink	Madeline	Alternative rock, emo	Wind-up	
September 4	We Are Wolves	Total Magique	Indie rock	Dare to Care	
September 5	Hanoi Rocks	Street Poetry	Glam punk, hard rock	Backstage Alliance Records	
September 7	Tiësto	In Search of Sunrise 6: Ibiza	Trance, progressive trance	Black Hole, SongBird	
September 8	Angus & Julia Stone	A Book Like This	Indie folk	Flock, PIAS	
September 10	Animal Collective	Strawberry Jam	Experimental pop	Domino	
September 10	The Go! Team	Proof of Youth	Indie rock, indie pop, alternative dance	Memphis Industries	
September 10	Insect Warfare	World Extermination	Grindcore	625 Thrashcore Records, Earache	
September 10	King Creosote	Bombshell	Folk, pop	679, Names Records	
September 10	KT Tunstall	Drastic Fantastic	Alternative rock, pop rock	Relentless	
September 10	Modeselektor	Happy Birthday!	IDM	BPitch Control	
September 10	Siouxsie Sioux	Mantaray	Alternative rock, pop	W14 Music, Universal	
September 11	50 Cent	Curtis	East Coast hip-hop	Shady, Aftermath, Interscope	
September 11	Andrew Jackson Jihad	People Who Can Eat People Are the Luckiest People in the World	Folk punk, anti-folk	Asian Man	
September 11	Angels of Light	We Are Him		Young God	
September 11	ASG	Win Us Over	Stoner rock, stoner metal, hard rock	Volcom	
September 11	Black Lips	Good Bad Not Evil	Rock and roll, garage rock	Vice, In the Red	
September 11	The Good Life	Help Wanted Nights	Indie rock	Saddle Creek	
September 11	Iced Earth	Framing Armageddon: Something Wicked Part 1	Power metal, heavy metal, thrash metal	SPV GmbH	
September 11	Kanye West	Graduation	Hip-hop	Roc-A-Fella	
September 11	Kenny Chesney	Just Who I Am: Poets & Pirates	Country	BNA	
September 11	Mustard Plug	In Black and White	Ska punk	Hopeless	
September 11	Necro	Death Rap	Horrorcore, rap metal	Psycho+Logical	
September 11	Pinback	Autumn of the Seraphs	Math rock	Touch and Go	
September 14	Apocalyptica	Worlds Collide	Alternative metal, hard rock, neoclassical metal	Jive, Zomba, Sony BMG	
September 14	Chamillionaire	Ultimate Victory	Southern hip-hop	Chamillitary, Universal	
September 14	HIM	Venus Doom	Gothic metal	Sire	
September 14	Various artists	Across the Universe (Music from the Motion Picture)	Rock, pop	Interscope	
September 17	Booty Luv	Boogie 2nite	EDM	Hedkandi	
September 17	Edwyn Collins	Home Again		Heavenly	
September 17	Gloria Estefan	90 Millas	Cuban, tropical	Burgundy, Sony BMG	
September 17	James Blunt	All the Lost Souls	Pop rock, folk rock	Atlantic, Custard	
September 17	A Place to Bury Strangers	A Place to Bury Strangers		Killer Pimp, Rocket Girl	
September 17	Status Quo	In Search of the Fourth Chord	Hard rock, blues rock, boogie rock	Fourth Chord Records	
September 18	Akron/Family	Love Is Simple		Young God	
September 18	Babyface	Playlist		Mercury	
September 18	Barry Manilow	The Greatest Songs of the Seventies	Easy listening	Arista	
September 18	Between the Buried and Me	Colors	Progressive metal	Victory	
September 18	The Black Dahlia Murder	Nocturnal	Melodic death metal	Metal Blade	
September 18	Candy Dulfer	Candy Store	Jazz	Heads Up	
September 18	The Donnas	Bitchin'	Hard rock	Purple Feather, RedEye	
September 18	Dropkick Murphys	The Meanest of Times	Celtic punk	Born & Bred	
September 18	Eddie Vedder	Into the Wild	Folk rock	J	
September 18	Four Year Strong	Rise or Die Trying	Rock	Decaydance, I Surrender	
September 18	Havoc	The Kush	Hip-hop, East Coast hip-hop	Nature Sounds	
September 18	Keke Palmer	So Uncool	R&B	Atlantic	
September 18	Kevin Drew	Spirit If...	Indie rock	Arts & Crafts	
September 18	Th' Legendary Shack Shakers	Swampblood	Alternative country, country blues, swamp rock	Yep Roc	
September 18	Ministry	The Last Sucker	Industrial metal, thrash metal	13th Planet	
September 18	Motion City Soundtrack	Even If It Kills Me	Alternative rock, power pop, emo	Epitaph	
September 18	New Found Glory	From the Screen to Your Stereo Part II	Pop-punk	Drive-Thru	
September 18	Pat Monahan	Last of Seven	Rock, soul	Columbia	
September 18	Percee P	Perseverance	Hip-hop	Stones Throw	
September 18	Reba McEntire	Reba: Duets	Country	MCA Nashville	
September 18	Rogue Wave	Asleep at Heaven's Gate	Indie rock	Brushfire	
September 18	Les Savy Fav	Let's Stay Friends	Art punk, indie rock	Frenchkiss	
September 18	Schoolyard Heroes	Abominations		Island Def Jam	
September 18	Submersed	Immortal Verses		Wind-up	
September 18	Suicide Silence	The Cleansing	Deathcore	Century Media	
September 18	Thousand Foot Krutch	The Flame in All of Us	Christian rock	Tooth & Nail	
September 18	Thurston Moore	Trees Outside the Academy	Alternative rock	Ecstatic Peace!	
September 18	Twista	Adrenaline Rush 2007	Hip-hop	Atlantic	
September 18	Various artists	The Simpsons: Testify		Shout! Factory, EMI	
September 18	Vicente Fernández	Para Siempre	Bolero, mariachi	Sony BMG Norte	
September 19	will.i.am	Songs About Girls	Hip-hop, electronic, R&B	will.i.am, Interscope	
September 20	Super Junior	Don't Don	Pop, R&B, alternative rock	SM	
September 21	Monrose	Strictly Physical		Starwatch, Cheyenne Records, Warner Bros.	
September 21	Primal Fear	New Religion	Power metal	Frontiers	
September 22	The Cat Empire	So Many Nights		Two Shoes Pty Ltd	
September 24	Arch Enemy	Rise of the Tyrant	Melodic death metal	Century Media	
September 24	Future of the Left	Curses	Post-hardcore, noise rock	Too Pure	
September 24	José González	In Our Nature	Indie rock, folk rock	Mute	
September 24	Keyshia Cole	Just Like You	R&B, hip-hop soul	Imani Entertainment, Geffen	
September 24	PJ Harvey	White Chalk	Chamber pop	Island	
September 25	All Time Low	So Wrong, It's Right	Pop-punk	Hopeless	
September 25	Army of the Pharaohs	Ritual of Battle	Hip-hop, horrorcore	Babygrande	
September 25	Bettye LaVette	The Scene of the Crime	Soul	Anti-	
September 25	The Bled	Silent Treatment	Hardcore punk, mathcore, post-hardcore	Vagrant	
September 25	Blue Rodeo	Small Miracles	Country rock	Warner Canada	
September 25	Boys Noize	Oi Oi Oi	Electro house, electroclash, tech house	Boysnoize Records	
September 25	Bruce Springsteen	Magic	Rock	Columbia	
September 25	The Cave Singers	Invitation Songs	indie rock, indie folk	Matador	
September 25	Chaka Khan	Funk This	R&B, soul, funk	Burgundy	
September 25	Darkthrone	F.O.A.D.	Crust punk, black metal	Peaceville	
September 25	David Crowder Band	Remedy	Christian rock, contemporary worship	sixstepsrecords, Sparrow	
September 25	Dethklok	The Dethalbum	Melodic death metal	Williams Street	
September 25	Devendra Banhart	Smokey Rolls Down Thunder Canyon		XL	
September 25	Down	Over the Under	Sludge metal, stoner metal	Roadrunner	
September 25	Fee	We Shine	CCM, Christian rock	INO	
September 25	Foo Fighters	Echoes, Silence, Patience & Grace	Alternative rock, post-grunge, hard rock	Roswell, RCA	
September 25	Freezepop	Future Future Future Perfect	Synth-pop	Cordless	
September 25	Gorilla Zoe	Welcome to the Zoo	Hip-hop	Bad Boy South, Block, Atlantic	
September 25	Herbie Hancock	River: The Joni Letters	Jazz	Verve	
September 25	Iron & Wine	The Shepherd's Dog	Folk rock	Sub Pop	
September 25	Jagged Edge	Baby Makin' Project	R&B	So So Def, Island	
September 25	Jill Scott	The Real Thing: Words and Sounds Vol. 3	Neo soul	Hidden Beach	
September 25	Joni Mitchell	Shine	Pop, rock	Hear Music, Universal	
September 25	Melissa Etheridge	The Awakening	Rock	Island	
September 25	Queen Latifah	Trav'lin' Light	Vocal jazz, R&B	Verve, Universal	
September 25	Rascal Flatts	Still Feels Good	Country pop	Lyric Street	
September 25	State Radio	Year of the Crow	Indie rock, rock, reggae	Ruff Shod Records	
September 25	Steve Earle	Washington Square Serenade		New West	
September 25	The Weakerthans	Reunion Tour	Indie rock	Epitaph, Anti-	
September 25	Wolves in the Throne Room	Two Hunters	Black metal, dark ambient, post-metal	Southern Lord	
September 25	Zolof the Rock & Roll Destroyer	Schematics	Indie rock, pop rock, indie pop	Le Pamplemousse Records, FlightPlan Records	
September 26	Nightwish	Dark Passion Play	Symphonic metal	Spinefarm, Nuclear Blast, Roadrunner	
September 28	The Parlotones	A World Next Door to Yours	Indie rock, alternative rock, post-punk revival	Sovereign Entertainment	
September 29	Muscles	Guns Babes Lemonade	Electronica		

== Fourth quarter ==
=== October ===
List of albums released in October 2007
Go to: January | February | March | April | May | June | July | August | September | October | November | December | Back to top
Release date	Artist	Album	Genre	Label	Ref.
October 1	Annie Lennox	Songs of Mass Destruction	Pop rock, funk rock, blues rock	RCA	
October 1	Babyshambles	Shotter's Nation	Indie rock, garage punk	EMI, Parlophone, Astralwerks	
October 1	The Cult	Born into This	Hard rock	Roadrunner	
October 1	Flying Lotus	Reset	Electronic	Warp	
October 1	Jeffrey Lewis	12 Crass Songs	Folk punk, anti-folk	Rough Trade	
October 1	Katie Melua	Pictures	Easy listening, blues, jazz	Dramatico	
October 1	Oceansize	Frames	Progressive rock	Superball Music	
October 1	Pram	The Moving Frontier	Experimental pop, post-rock	Domino	
October 1	Sugababes	Change	Pop rock, dance-pop	Island	
October 1	Ulver	Shadows of the Sun		Jester, The End	
October 2	Aceyalone	Lightning Strikes	Hip-hop	Decon	
October 2	Anti-Flag	A Benefit for Victims of Violent Crime	Punk rock	A-F	
October 2	Born of Osiris	The New Reign	Deathcore	Sumerian	
October 2	Brooks & Dunn	Cowboy Town	Country	Arista Nashville	
October 2	Dashboard Confessional	The Shade of Poison Trees	Emo	Vagrant	
October 2	David Byrne	Live from Austin, Texas	Alternative rock	New West	
October 2	J. Holiday	Back of My Lac'	R&B, hip-hop	Music Line Group, Capitol	
October 2	John Fogerty	Revival	Roots rock, heartland rock Americana	Fantasy	
October 2	MGMT	Oracular Spectacular	Neo-psychedelia	Columbia	
October 2	The Most Serene Republic	Population	Indie rock	Arts & Crafts	
October 2	Om	Pilgrimage	Stoner rock	Southern Lord	
October 2	Prong	Power of the Damager	Groove metal, thrash metal	13th Planet	
October 2	Rosetta	Wake/Lift	Post-metal, space rock	Translation Loss Records	
October 2	Sharon Jones & the Dap-Kings	100 Days, 100 Nights	Funk, soul, retro-soul	Daptone	
October 2	Soulja Boy Tell 'Em	Souljaboytellem.com	Snap, Southern hip-hop	Interscope	
October 3	Underworld	Oblivion with Bells		Different Recordings, Traffic, Side One	
October 4	Jennifer Lopez	Brave	Pop, R&B	Epic	
October 5	Alter Bridge	Blackbird	Post-grunge, alternative metal	Universal Republic	
October 7	The Warlocks	Heavy Deavy Skull Lover	Psychedelic rock, neo-psychedelia, shoegaze	Tee Pee	
October 8	Anika Moa	In Swings the Tide	Pop, folk, country	EMI	
October 8	Celebration	The Modern Tribe	Indie rock	4AD	
October 8	Cowboy Junkies	Trinity Revisited	Alternative country, country blues	Cooking Vinyl	
October 8	The Fiery Furnaces	Widow City	Indie rock	Thrill Jockey	
October 8	Jack Peñate	Matinée	Indie rock	XL	
October 8	Nadja	Radiance of Shadows	Drone metal, noise rock, ambient	Alien8	
October 8	Pet Shop Boys	Disco 4		Parlophone	
October 8	Robert Wyatt	Comicopera		Domino	
October 9	9th Wonder	The Dream Merchant Vol. 2	Hip-hop	6 Hole, Caroline	
October 9	Band of Horses	Cease to Begin	Indie rock	Sub Pop	
October 9	Beirut	The Flying Club Cup	Balkan folk, indie folk, baroque pop	Ba Da Bing, 4AD	
October 9	Bizarre	Blue Cheese & Coney Island	Underground hip-hop, hardcore hip-hop	Koch	
October 9	Café Tacuba	Sino	Latin alternative, Latin rock	Universal Music Mexico	
October 9	Carbon/Silicon	The Last Post	Rock	Carbon Silicon Records	
October 9	Cass McCombs	Dropping the Writ	Folk	Domino	
October 9	Electric Six	I Shall Exterminate Everything Around Me That Restricts Me from Being the Master	Rock	Metropolis	
October 9	Enon	Grass Geysers...Carbon Clouds	Noise rock, art pop, post-punk	Touch and Go	
October 9	The Hives	The Black and White Album	Garage rock	A&M Octone, Polydor	
October 9	Josh Groban	Noël	Pop, Christmas, classical	143, Reprise	
October 9	Kid Rock	Rock n Roll Jesus	Hard rock, heartland rock	Atlantic	
October 9	LeAnn Rimes	Family	Country	Curb	
October 9	Moving Units	Hexes for Exes	Alternative dance	Metropolis	
October 9	Overkill	Immortalis	Thrash metal, groove metal	Bodog Music	
October 9	Puddle of Mudd	Famous	Alternative rock	Geffen	
October 9	Robert Pollard	Coast to Coast Carpet of Love	Indie rock	Merge	
October 9	She Wants Revenge	This Is Forever	Post-punk revival, dark wave, gothic rock	Perfect Kiss Records	
October 9	Sunset Rubdown	Random Spirit Lover	Indie rock	Jagjaguwar	
October 9	Vanessa Carlton	Heroes & Thieves	Pop rock	The Inc., Universal Motown	
October 9	A Wilhelm Scream	Career Suicide	Punk rock, melodic hardcore	Nitro	
October 10	Radiohead	In Rainbows	Alternative rock, avant-rock, art rock	Xendless Xurbia, XL, TBD	
October 10	Stereophonics	Pull the Pin	Rock, post-grunge	V2	
October 14	Taylor Swift	The Taylor Swift Holiday Collection	Christmas, country pop	Big Machine	
October 15	Alison Moyet	The Turn	Pop, rock	W14 Music, Universal Catalogue	
October 15	Efterklang	Parades	Post-rock, dream pop, neoclassical dark wave	The Leaf Label, Rumraket	
October 15	Ian Brown	The World Is Yours	Alternative rock	Fiction, Polydor	
October 15	R.E.M.	R.E.M. Live	Alternative rock	Warner Bros.	
October 15	Róisín Murphy	Overpowered	Electropop, dance-pop	EMI	
October 16	Behold... The Arctopus	Skullgrid	Technical death metal, instrumental metal	Black Market Activities	
October 16	Byla and Jarboe	Viscera		Translation Loss Records	
October 16	Jars of Clay	Christmas Songs	Christmas music	Gray Matters, Nettwerk	
October 16	Jimmy Eat World	Chase This Light	Power pop, pop rock, pop-punk	Interscope	
October 16	Kenna	Make Sure They See My Face	Alternative rock, alternative dance	Interscope, Star Trak	
October 16	Michael W. Smith	It's a Wonderful Christmas	Christmas, pop	Reunion, Sparrow	
October 16	Steel Train	Trampoline	Folk rock	Drive-Thru	
October 16	Thrice	The Alchemy Index: Volumes I & II—Fire & Water	Post-hardcore, trip hop	Vagrant	
October 16	The Tony Danza Tapdance Extravaganza	Danza II: The Electric Boogaloo	Mathcore, grindcore	Black Market Activities	
October 16	Umphrey's McGee	Live at the Murat	Progressive rock	SCI Fidelity	
October 17	Dave Gahan	Hourglass		Mute	
October 17	Kent	Tillbaka till samtiden	Alternative rock	RCA, Sony BMG	
October 19	Einstürzende Neubauten	Alles wieder offen	Experimental rock	Potomak	
October 19	Soilwork	Sworn to a Great Divide	Melodic death metal	Nuclear Blast	
October 20	Delta Goodrem	Delta	Pop rock, dance-pop	Sony BMG, Mercury	
October 22	The Hoosiers	The Trick to Life	Pop rock, indie pop, post-punk revival	RCA	
October 22	Orson	Culture Vultures		Mercury	
October 22	Serj Tankian	Elect the Dead	Alternative rock, hard rock, heavy metal	Serjical Strike, Reprise	
October 22	Shaggy	Intoxication	Reggae, dancehall, R&B	VP	
October 23	Carrie Underwood	Carnival Ride	Country	Arista Nashville	
October 23	Cobra Starship	¡Viva la Cobra!	Dance-rock	Fueled by Ramen, Decaydance	
October 23	Coheed and Cambria	Good Apollo, I'm Burning Star IV, Volume Two: No World for Tomorrow	Progressive rock	Columbia	
October 23	The Forms	The Forms		Threespheres	
October 23	Gary Allan	Living Hard	Country	MCA Nashville	
October 23	Holy Fuck	LP	Electronica, instrumental rock	Dependent Music, Young Turks	
October 23	Hurricane Chris	51/50 Ratchet	Hip-hop, Southern hip-hop	Polo Grounds, J	
October 23	Juanes	La Vida... Es Un Ratico	Latin pop	Universal Music Latino	
October 23	Liquid Trio Experiment	Spontaneous Combustion	Jazz fusion, progressive rock	Magna Carta	
October 23	Little Brother	Getback	Hip-hop	ABB Records	
October 23	Neil Young	Chrome Dreams II	Heartland rock, country rock	Reprise	
October 23	Opeth	The Roundhouse Tapes		Peaceville	
October 23	Prefuse 73	Preparations	Electronic	Warp	
October 23	Relient K	Let It Snow, Baby... Let It Reindeer	Christmas, Christian rock, pop-punk	Gotee	
October 23	The Residents	The Voice of Midnight		Mute, EMI	
October 23	Rob Zombie	Zombie Live	Heavy metal, industrial metal, nu metal	Geffen	
October 23	Robert Plant and Alison Krauss	Raising Sand	Americana, folk, country	Rounder, Zoë	
October 23	Ryan Adams & the Cardinals	Follow the Lights	Alternative country	Lost Highway	
October 23	Say Anything	In Defense of the Genre	Emo, pop-punk, alternative rock	J	
October 23	Seether	Finding Beauty in Negative Spaces	Alternative metal	Wind-up	
October 23	Shad	The Old Prince	Canadian hip-hop	Black Box Music	
October 23	Skindred	Roots Rock Riot	Alternative metal, reggae, nu metal	Bieler Bros.	
October 23	Sole and the Skyrider Band	Sole and the Skyrider Band	Hip-hop	Anticon	
October 23	Steven Curtis Chapman	This Moment	CCM, rock, pop	Sparrow	
October 23	Trae	Life Goes On	Southern hip-hop	Rap-A-Lot, Atlantic, Asylum	
October 23	Ween	La Cucaracha	Alternative rock, experimental rock	Rounder, Chocodog Records	
October 23	Yeasayer	All Hour Cymbals	Indie rock	We Are Free	
October 24	Backstreet Boys	Unbreakable	Pop	Jive	
October 24	Helloween	Gambling with the Devil	Power metal	SPV/Steamhammer	
October 25	Architects	Ruin	Metalcore	United by Fate, Distort, Century	
October 25	Britney Spears	Blackout	Dance-pop, electropop	Jive	
October 26	Exodus	The Atrocity Exhibition... Exhibit A	Thrash metal	Nuclear Blast	
October 30	Armor for Sleep	Smile for Them	Emo, post-hardcore	Sire	
October 30	The Autumn Offering	Fear Will Cast No Shadow	Metalcore	Victory	
October 30	Avenged Sevenfold	Avenged Sevenfold	Heavy metal	Warner Bros.	
October 30	Baby Bash	Cyclone	Hip-hop	Arista	
October 30	Bloodsimple	Red Harvest	Alternative metal	Bullygoat Records, Reprise	
October 30	Buck 65	Situation	Hip-hop	WEA, Strange Famous	
October 30	The Color Fred	Bend to Break	Indie rock, power pop	Equal Vision	
October 30	Eagles	Long Road Out of Eden	Rock	Eagles Recording Company II, Lost Highway, Polydor	
October 30	The Harlem Experiment	The Harlem Experiment	Jazz, funk	Ropeadope	
October 30	Josh Turner	Everything Is Fine	Country	MCA Nashville	
October 30	Levon Helm	Dirt Farmer	American folk	Vanguard	
October 30	Neverending White Lights	Act II: The Blood and the Life Eternal		MapleMusic, Ocean Records	
October 30	Nicole Atkins	Neptune City	Chamber pop, country pop	Red Ink, Columbia	
October 30	Otep	The Ascension	Nu metal	Koch	
October 30	Playaz Circle	Supply & Demand	Hip-hop	Disturbing tha Peace, Def Jam	
October 30	Puscifer	"V" Is for Vagina	Trip hop, post-industrial	Sony BMG, Puscifer Entertainment	
October 30	Saves the Day	Under the Boards	Emo, pop-punk, indie rock	Vagrant	
October 31	Arkona	Ot serdtsa k nebu	Folk metal	Sound Age Production	

=== November ===
List of albums released in November 2007
Go to: January | February | March | April | May | June | July | August | September | October | November | December | Back to top
Release date	Artist	Album	Genre	Label	Ref.
November 1	Angels & Airwaves	I-Empire	Alternative rock	Geffen	
November 1	Saul Williams	The Inevitable Rise and Liberation of NiggyTardust!	Industrial hip-hop, industrial rock	Fader	
November 2	Die Ärzte	Jazz ist anders	Punk rock, pop-punk, alternative rock	Hot Action Records	
November 3	The Veronicas	Hook Me Up	Pop	Sire	
November 4	Cock Sparrer	Here We Stand	Punk rock, Oi!	Captain Oi!	
November 5	Burial	Untrue	Dubstep, UK garage, ambient	Hyperdub	
November 5	The Dillinger Escape Plan	Ire Works	Mathcore	Relapse	
November 5	Gay for Johnny Depp	The Politics of Cruelty		Captains of Industry	
November 5	The Ocean	Precambrian	Post-metal, sludge metal, progressive metal	Metal Blade	
November 5	Westlife	Back Home	Pop	Syco, Sony BMG, RCA	
November 5	The Wombats	A Guide to Love, Loss & Desperation	Indie rock, post-punk, new wave	14th Floor	
November 6	Agnostic Front	Warriors	Hardcore punk, crossover thrash	Nuclear Blast	
November 6	Cassidy	B.A.R.S. The Barry Adrian Reese Story	East Coast hip-hop	J, Full Surface	
November 6	Chris Brown	Exclusive	R&B	Jive	
November 6	Christine Fellows	Nevertheless	Folk rock	Six Shooter	
November 6	Demon Hunter	Storm the Gates of Hell	Metalcore, alternative metal	Solid State	
November 6	Dion	Son of Skip James	Blues	Verve Forecast	
November 6	Impaled	The Last Gasp	Death metal	Willowtip Records	
November 6	Jay-Z	American Gangster	East Coast hip-hop, mafioso rap	Roc-A-Fella, Def Jam	
November 6	Monster Magnet	4-Way Diablo	Stoner rock	SPV	
November 6	Nonpoint	Vengeance	Nu metal, alternative metal	Bieler Bros.	
November 6	Saga	10,000 Days	Progressive rock	Inside Out Music, SPV GmbH	
November 6	White Williams	Smoke	Electropop	Tigerbeat6	
November 7	Celine Dion	Taking Chances	Pop, soft rock	Columbia	
November 9	Alicia Keys	As I Am	R&B	J	
November 9	Fish Leong	J'Adore	Mandopop	Rock	
November 9	Leona Lewis	Spirit	Pop, R&B	Syco	
November 12	Craig David	Trust Me	Hip-hop, R&B	Warner Bros., Sire	
November 12	Johnny Hallyday	Le Cœur d'un homme	Rock	WEA, Warner Music	
November 12	The Raveonettes	Lust Lust Lust		Fierce Panda	
November 12	Seal	System	Soul, R&B, dance-pop	Warner Bros.	
November 13	Bone Thugs-n-Harmony	T.H.U.G.S.	Hip-hop, R&B	Ruthless	
November 13	Boyz II Men	Motown: A Journey Through Hitsville USA	R&B	Decca, UMTV	
November 13	Cheri Dennis	In and Out of Love	R&B	Bad Boy, Atlantic	
November 13	Duran Duran	Red Carpet Massacre		Epic	
November 13	Gram Rabbit	RadioAngel & the RobotBeat	Psychedelic rock, industrial dance, electronica	Royal Order Records	
November 13	Queensrÿche	Take Cover	Progressive metal	Rhino	
November 13	Streetlight Manifesto	Somewhere in the Between	Ska punk	Victory	
November 13	Wire	Read & Burn 03		Pinkflag	
November 16	Girls Aloud	Tangled Up	Pop	Fascination, Polydor	
November 19	Bonnie "Prince" Billy	Ask Forgiveness	Folk rock, alternative country	Drag City, Domino	
November 19	Daft Punk	Alive 2007	French house	Virgin	
November 19	Tarja Turunen	My Winter Storm	Symphonic metal	Edel, Universal	
November 20	The Chipmunks	Alvin and the Chipmunks (Original Motion Picture Soundtrack)		Fox Music, Rhino, Razor & Tie	
November 20	Electric Wizard	Witchcult Today	Doom metal, stoner metal	Rise Above, Candlelight, Leaf Hound	
November 20	Freeway	Free at Last	East Coast hip-hop	Roc-A-Fella, Def Jam	
November 20	Genesis	Live over Europe 2007	Progressive rock, pop rock	Virgin, Atlantic	
November 20	Joe Lally	Nothing Is Underrated	Indie rock	Dischord	
November 20	Jordin Sparks	Jordin Sparks	Pop, R&B	Jive	
November 20	MercyMe	All That Is Within Me	Rock, worship	INO	
November 20	Mike Jones	The American Dream	Southern hip-hop	Asylum, Warner Bros.	
November 20	Nine Inch Nails	Year Zero Remixed	Industrial rock, electronica, industrial hip-hop	Interscope	
November 20	NOFX	They've Actually Gotten Worse Live!	Punk rock	Fat Wreck Chords	
November 20	OneRepublic	Dreaming Out Loud	Pop rock	Mosley Music, Interscope	
November 20	Sebastian Bach	Angel Down	Heavy metal	Caroline, Merovingian	
November 21	Kylie Minogue	X	Dance-pop, electronica	Parlophone	
November 21	L'Arc-en-Ciel	Kiss	Pop rock, alternative rock	Ki/oon	
November 23	Adriano Celentano	Dormi amore, la situazione non è buona	Pop rock, symphonic rock, blues	Ariola	
November 23	Alizée	Psychédélices	French pop, electropop	RCA, Sony BMG, Wisteria Song	
November 24	I Am Kloot	I Am Kloot Play Moolah Rouge	Indie rock	Skinny Dog	
November 26	All Angels	Into Paradise	Classical crossover, operatic pop	Universal Classics	
November 26	Connie Talbot	Over the Rainbow	Pop	Rainbow Recording Company	
November 26	Sons of Alpha Centauri	Sons of Alpha Centauri	Post-metal	Sound Devastation Records	
November 26	The Violets	The Lost Pages	Indie rock	Angular	
November 26	Wyclef Jean	Carnival Vol. II: Memoirs of an Immigrant		Columbia	
November 27	CunninLynguists	Dirty Acres	Hip-hop, Southern hip-hop	APOS Music, Bad Taste	
November 27	Jon Foreman	Fall	Acoustic	Lowercase People, Credential	
November 27	Pitbull	The Boatlift	Crunk	TVT	
November 30	Scooter	Jumping All Over the World	Jumpstyle	Sheffield Tunes	

=== December ===
List of albums released in December 2007
Go to: January | February | March | April | May | June | July | August | September | October | November | December | Back to top
Release date	Artist	Album	Genre	Label	Ref.
December 3	Cascada	Perfect Day	Eurodance	Zooland Records	
December 3	Remi Nicole	My Conscience and I		Universal Motown	
December 4	Blake Lewis	A.D.D. (Audio Day Dream)	Pop rock, electronic	Arista	
December 4	DJ Drama	Gangsta Grillz: The Album	Hip-hop	Grand Hustle, Atlantic	
December 4	Ghostface Killah	The Big Doe Rehab	Hip-hop	Def Jam	
December 4	Rufus Wainwright	Rufus Does Judy at Carnegie Hall		Geffen	
December 4	Scarface	Made	Hip-hop	Rap-A-Lot, Asylum, Atlantic	
December 4	Styles P	Super Gangster (Extraordinary Gentleman)	Hip-hop	D-Block Records, Koch	
December 4	Too Short	Get off the Stage	Hyphy, dirty rap	Up All Nite, Jive	
December 10	Mario	Go	R&B	3rd Street Records, J	
December 11	Beanie Sigel	The Solution	Hip-hop	Roc-A-Fella, Def Jam	
December 11	Birdman	5 * Stunna	Southern hip-hop, gangsta rap	Cash Money, Universal Motown	
December 11	Bow Wow and Omarion	Face Off	R&B, hip-hop	Columbia	
December 11	The-Dream	Love Hate	R&B	Radio Killa, Def Jam	
December 11	Gucci Mane	Back to the Trap House	Hip-hop, gangsta rap	Atlantic	
December 11	Hi-Tek	Hi-Teknology 3	Hip-hop	Babygrande	
December 11	Wu-Tang Clan	8 Diagrams	Hip-hop	SRC, Universal Motown	
December 18	Chingy	Hate It or Love It	Hip-hop	Slot-A-Lot Records, DTP, Def Jam South	
December 18	Jaheim	The Makings of a Man	R&B	Atlantic	
December 18	Lupe Fiasco	Lupe Fiasco's The Cool	Progressive hip-hop	1st & 15th Entertainment, Atlantic	
December 18	Mary J. Blige	Growing Pains	R&B	Geffen	
December 25	Atmosphere	Strictly Leakage	Hip-hop	Rhymesayers	
