= Fluorescent (disambiguation) =

Fluorescent may refer to:

- Fluorescence, the emission of light by a substance that has absorbed light or other electromagnetic radiation

== Music ==
- "Fluorescent", a song by Gwen Stefani from her second studio album, The Sweet Escape
- "Fluorescent", a song by Pet Shop Boys from their twelfth studio album, Electric

== See also ==
- Fluorescent Grey, an extended play by Deerhunter
