= Feuermann =

Feuermann might refer to:

- Emanuel Feuermann, a 20th century Austrian cellist
- Feuermann (ghost), a fiery ghost from German folklore

== See also ==
- Feuerman
- Faerman
