= Tim Key. With a String Quartet. On a Boat. =

Studio album by Tim Key
- Released: 8 November 2010
- Genre: Comedy/Poetry
- Length: 59.10
- Language: English
- Label: Angular Recording Corporation/The Invisible Dot

Tim Key. With a String Quartet. On a Boat. is a comedic poetry album written by and starring Tim Key and co-starring Tom Basden. The album is intended to be Key reading out his poems with the accompaniment of a string quartet, but actually it primarily features Key and Basden, who is nicknamed "Lord", constantly arguing with each other.

== Plot ==
As the title of the album suggests, Key is on a recording studio based on a boat in the East End of London. He is reading out his comic poems to music provided by a string quartet. Later during the recording Basden appears, unaware that Key had booked a string quartet and under the belief that he was to provide the music for the album with his guitar.

Each track in the album consists of one poem read by Key, except for the track "Lord's Moment" which consists of Basden playing a song on his guitar. Many of the poems are very short, consisting of just four words and some tracks lasting less than a quarter of a minute. However, most of the album consists of Key and Basden arguing. For example, Key tells him he cannot have a coke if he is playing the harmonica. At the end of "Jet Walsh", Key puts Basden's guitar case between Basden and the women in the quartet for fear Basden is getting too close to them. The reference incorrectly states that it is a viola case that is used as the barrier.

== Production ==
The album was created the year following Key's victory at the Edinburgh Comedy Awards in 2009 where he won the main prize for his show The Slutcracker. In 2010, Key decided he was not going to do a new show so this left him a gap in which he could do new work. His management, The Invisible Dot, suggested creating an album. Key said in an interview with The Daily Telegraph: "It was the first thing I've done where I have had no idea whether it is viable or not. There was an awkward clash of styles, between a string quartet that are used to doing concerts, working with professionals and me just sitting there with scraps of paper, just saying: 'OK, can you do a bit more of your classical music, and I'll do my poems.' It is a very peculiar sell I think." Key told the BBC that he had never performed with a string quartet before the making of the album.

Joe Daniel, the co-founder of the Angular Recording Corporation which made the album said that: "It isn't a 'live' album of a stand-up [show]. The material was put together specifically for the record, and in that respect it is like that quaintly English format, the radio play."

The album was released only as a digital download and as 1,000 limited edition vinyl records.

== Reception ==
Professional ratings
Review scores
Source	Rating
British Comedy Guide	4/5 stars
Drowned in Sound	7/10 stars
NME	8/10 stars

Reviews of the album have been mainly positive. Steve Bennett of Chortle said, "his unique persona is warmly compelling, and his imaginative word-pictures are ideally suited to an audio release. In the end, the gently brittle journey Key takes you on is as modestly beautiful as it is charmingly disconcerting."

Tim Burrows of The Daily Telegraph said that the album, "is closest in spirit to Peter Cook and Dudley Moore's brilliantly foulmouthed project, Derek and Clive, which first saw the light of day in 1976." However, Ian Wolf of the British Comedy Guide disagreed saying: "I think that is taking it a bit too far. For starters it is not nearly as rude (although 'Chess' does feature the c-word) and Key's album is not as laugh-out-loud funny as the genius of Pete and Dud."

Wolf, however, also said, "the poems are funny no matter what the length" and that, "There are many moments of mirth and it is a worthwhile listen."

Sam Walby of Drowned in Sound did have criticisms saying, "that Key is sometimes too deadpan for his own good, making his one-line pieces a little stilted. A case in point is the three poems about Bob ('Bob And The Pipe', 'Bob And The Octopus' and 'The Tragedy of Bob'), which might work on stage but do not transfer as well onto tape." However, he did say: "At points it drags, but Tim Key. With A String Quartet. On A Boat. is as good an introduction as any to Key's off-kilter insanity and love of everyday nonsense."

== Track listing ==
No.	Title	Length
1.	"Dead Claire"	2:08
2.	"1000 Dogs"	2:23
3.	"Bob And The Pipe"	1:38
4.	"Bending Over"	1:40
5.	"The Good Driver"	3:14
6.	"Bob And The Octopus"	1:10
7.	"Itchy"	2:31
8.	"The Trouble With War"	2:13
9.	"The Doctor's Cabinets"	1:25
10.	"Chess"	1:59
11.	"Eggs"	1:57
12.	"Janet/Gannet"	0:14
13.	"The Goat"	1:53
14.	"Plastic Surgery"	0.43
15.	"The Fiver"	2:19
16.	"How To Behave If You're Trapped On An Island With A Giant"	2:28
17.	"Tiger"	1:39
18.	"Yawning"	1:44
19.	"Ant"	0:13
20.	"Bugwoman"	1:32
21.	"Jet Walsh"	1:28
22.	"The Bribe"	0:32
23.	"Flank"	1:10
24.	"The Tragedy of Bob"	1:41
25.	"Bubble"	0:28
26.	"The Date"	1:16
27.	"Roy"	1:59
28.	"Chris Jumped Out Of A Plane"	1:42
29.	"Lord's Moment"	5:18
30.	"Waterloo"	3:22
31.	"Siberian Waitress (Bonus Track)"	5:11
Total length:		59.10
