= Faerman =

Faerman is an Ashkenazi surname equivalent to German Feuermann. Notable people with the surname include:

- Pesya Faerman, birth name of Laura Hidalgo (1927–2005), Argentine actress
- Frank Faerman, drummer from Insect Warfare
- Mikhaïl Faerman, Soviet and Belgian classical pianist

== See also ==
- Fayermann
- Frayerman
