= Findo Gask (band) =

- Origin: Scotland
- Genres: Electropop, Indie pop
- Years active: 2005 - 2010
- Labels: Angular Recording Corporation
- Members: Gerard Black; Michael Marshall; Gregory Williams; Gavin Thomson
- Website: www.myspace.com/findogaskuk

Findo Gask were an electropop band from Glasgow, Scotland, comprising Gerard Black (Kaoss Pad, guitar, vocals, synths), Michael Marshall (guitar, drums, synths, programming), Gregory Williams (bass, vocals, synths, guitar), and Gavin Thomson (synths, vocals, programming, guitar, bass).

== Discography ==
=== Singles ===
- "Findo Gask"/"Errors" split 7-inch (2005)
- "Va Va Va" (2007)
- "One Eight Zero" (2008)
