= The Lodger (band) =

English indie pop band

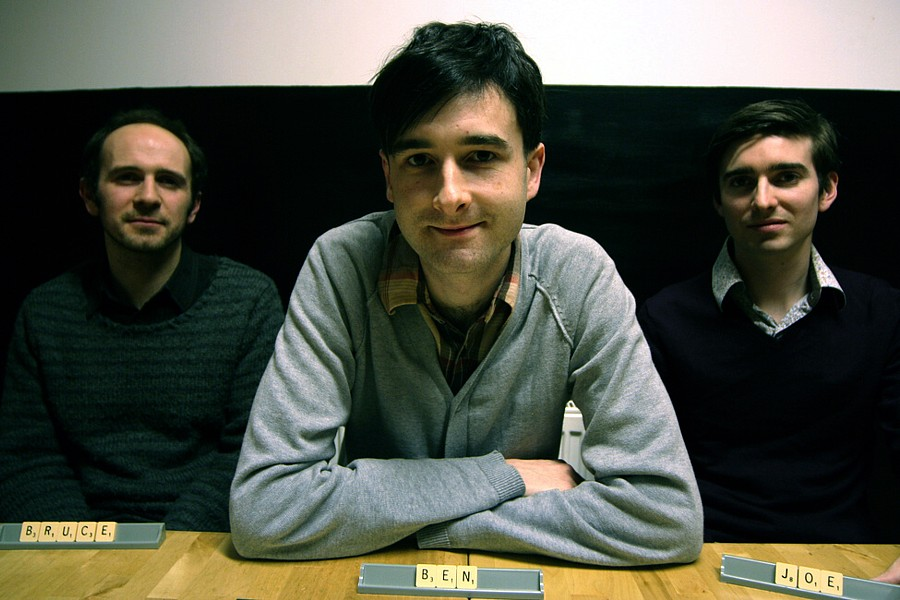
- The Lodger

Background information
- Origin: Leeds, England
- Genres: Indie pop
- Years active: 2004–present
- Labels: Bad Sneakers Records, Angular Recording Corporation, Slumberland Records, Fabtone Records, Noise Deluxe, Double Dragon, Dance to the Radio, Fabtone, On The Bone, Dogbox, Wrath
- Members: Ben Siddall (vocals/guitar/keyboards); Joe Margetts (bass guitar); Bruce Renshaw(drums/percussion); Tim Corbridge(guitar/lap steel/keys)
- Past members: Lisa Harker (bass guitar); Katie James (drums)

The Lodger are an indie pop band from Leeds, England, formed in 2004.

== History ==
The Lodger formed in 2004, after Leeds label Dance to the Radio offered to put out a single on the basis of demos that Ben Siddall recorded in his bedsit, the band name inspired by his accommodation. The initial line-up was Siddall on guitar and vocals with Lisa Harker on bass and Bruce Renshaw on drums. After 3 sold-out limited 7-inches ("Many Thanks For Your Honest Opinion" on Dance to the Radio, "Watching" on Double Dragon, and "Let Her Go" on Angular Records) and touring around the UK and Europe with bands such as The Long Blondes and The Research, the group released their debut album Grown-Ups, produced by Alan Smyth and James Ford, in June 2007 on Angular Records in the UK, Slumberland Records in the US, Fabtone in Japan and Speak N Spell in Australia. By this time Harker and Renshaw had left the band, to be replaced by Joe Margetts and Katie James (later again replaced by Bruce Renshaw).

Critical acclaim for the album followed, drawing comparisons with Orange Juice, The Wedding Present, and Heavenly, and it was rated at number 4 in This Is Fake DIY's Albums of 2007. The band have featured heavily on the elbo.ws charts since the release along with heavy rotation on US college radio and other stations worldwide. The album was voted as 62nd best of 2007 on www.amazon.com and 95th in Woxy.com's Top 97 of '07. The Lodger recently completed their first tour of the US in late 2007 and then entered the studio to record their 2nd album in November. The 2nd album is titled Life Is Sweet and was released in May 2008, again to a positive critical reaction.

The Guardian described the band early on in their career: "Imagine a more bitter and twisted Housemartins, or early James".

== Band members ==
- Ben Siddall: vocals, acoustic guitar, electric guitar, keyboards
- Joe Margetts: bass guitar
- Bruce Renshaw: drums, percussion
- Tim Corbridge: lap steel, guitar

== Discography ==
=== Studio albums ===
- Grown-Ups (May 2007) (CD/LP/download album - released in various countries through Fabtone, Angular Recording Corporation, Noise Deluxe, Slumberland, Speak N Spell/Etch N Sketch)
- Life is Sweet (May 2008) (CD/LP/album - released in various countries through Fabtone, Bad Sneakers Records, Noise Deluxe, Slumberland, Speak N Spell/Etch N Sketch)
- Flashbacks (April 26, 2010) (CD/LP/download - This Is Fake DIY Records (UK) and Slumberland Records (US))
- Cul-De-Sac Of Love (March 12, 2021) (CD/LP/download - Philophobia Music)

=== Singles ===
- 7-inch single - "Many Thanks For Your Honest Opinion" (Dance to the Radio) May 2005
- Split 7-inch single - "Getting Special" (Wrath) June 2005
- 7-inch single/download - "Watching" / "Not So Fast" (Double Dragon) December 2005
- 7-inch single/download - "Let Her Go" (Angular Recording Corporation) May 2006
- Download single - "Kicking Sand" / "Centuries" (Angular Recording Corporation) April 2007
- 7-inch single/download - "The Good Old Days" (Bad Sneakers) April 2008
- 7-inch EP single/download - "I Think I Need You" (Elefant Records) June 2009
- 7-inch EP single/download - "Have A Little Faith In People" (DIY Records (UK) and Slumberland Records (US)) April 2010

=== Compilation appearances ===
- CD compilation - Dance to the Radio: Leeds featuring "Unsatisfied" (Dance to the Radio) April 2005
- CD compilation on front of Thee Humbug Issue 3 featuring "Unsatisfied" (Thee Sheffield Phonographic Corporation) September 2005
- CD compilation - What We All Want featuring "You Got Me Wrong" (Dance to the Radio) February 2006
- CD compilation - Blue Skies Up: Welcome to the New Pop Revolution featuring "Not So Fast" (Dogbox) May 2006
- CD compilation - Future Love Songs featuring "Simply Left Behind" (Angular Recording Corporation) November 2006
- CD compilation - On the Bone Vol 1 featuring "Let's Make A Pact" (On the Bone) February 2007
