= Gyratory System =

Gyratory System (band)
- Origin: London, England
- Genres: Electronic; experimental; psychedelic; avant-garde; Krautrock; post-punk; free-jazz
- Years active: 1993–present
- Labels: Hansard; Angular Recording Corporation
- Members: Andrew Blick; Robin Blick; James Weaver
- Past members: Laurie Waller; Merek Cooper; Daniel Patrick Quinn
- Website: Official Website

Gyratory System is a three-piece music band based in London. It is fronted by producer/trumpet player Andrew Blick. Blick was a session musician in the 1990s and previously a member of One More Grain. His trumpet-playing style, which involves the heavy use of electronic treatments, has been likened to 'Miles Davis circa On The Corner, Andy Diagram or Jon Hassell'. Another journalist has written: 'A British experimental legend, producer Andrew Blick’s three piece must be the UK’s only acid-fried, horn-led electronic marching band'.

Gyratory System's music is created using a technique called 'The Process'. The resulting sound has been compared to electronica, krautrock, post-punk and avant-garde classical music. Paul Lester of The Guardian wrote: 'You may be able to detect the influence of composers such as Steve Reich here, and it may sound ultra cerebral, but...this is seriously danceable stuff...If anything, this music recalls the experimental early-80s "avant-funk" of the likes of A Certain Ratio and, in particular, 23 Skidoo'. Also in The Guardian, Alex Miller, awarding the band's release Sea Containers House 'single of the week' on 19 September 2009, stated: 'Maybe when the industry catches up with them and 2011 is rammed with music that sounds like a neurotic death rave of farting Klangers I'll resent them, but until then this is what I'm all about. Sing along everybody! Fart, clunk, parp!'

The debut Gyratory System album, The Sound-Board Breathes, was released in October 2009. It was praised by critics, John Doran for the BBC describing it as a 'superb album, sounding like little else released this year'. NME rated it 8/10. In 2010, Dazed Digital described the album as 'one of last year’s most essential records'.

Gyratory System has received strong radio support, including sessions for XFM and BBC 6Music.

The band has toured the UK as a headline act and supported Soulwax/2manydjs.

Gyratory System's second album, New Harmony, was released on 16 April 2011, on Angular Recording Corporation. On 24 January 2011 NME rated 'Pamplona', taken from New Harmony, as one of its '10 tracks you have to hear this week', describing Gyratory System as 'wonderfully warped electronica...allow your neurons to be frazzled'. In an early review of New Harmony the music critic Everett True wrote 'I love this music...it bounces and quirks like a wind-up set of chattering teeth'.

The band's third album, Utility Music, was issued in 2014. Louder Than War critic Paul Scott-Bates wrote, "Imagine the BBC Radiophonic Workshop meets early OMD meets Sesame Street and you won't be far wrong with this lovely little thing. Utility Music is an absolute delight."
