= The Lost Pages =

The Lost Pages (album)

Studio album by the Violets
- Released: 26 November 2007
- Genres: Indie rock; electronic rock; post-punk; experimental rock
- Label: Angular
- Producer: Alan O'Connell

Professional ratings
Review scores
| Source | Rating |
|---|---|
| Artrocker | (Positive) link |
| Clash | (Positive) link |
| Drowned in Sound | (5/10) link |
| Gigwise | link |
| Loud and Quiet | (8/10) link |
| Metro | link |
| Vice | (9/10) link |

The Lost Pages is the debut album by the Violets, released in 2007. According to AllMusic, there is an "uncanny" vocal similarity to Siouxsie Sioux and a strong resemblance of other late 1970s post-punk acts from the United Kingdom such as the Cure.

== Track listing ==
All tracks written by The Violets

1. "Shade To Be"
2. "Descend"
3. "Troubles of Keneat"
4. "In Your Statue"
5. "Forget Me Not"
6. "Co-Plax"
7. "Foreo"
8. "Hush Away"
9. "Half Light"
10. "Parting Glances"
11. "Nature of Obsession"

== Personnel ==
- Alexis Mary – vocals, melodica, piano
- Joe Daniel – guitar, bass, synths, noise
- Andrew Moran – drums, percussion
