= Wetdog =

English post-punk band

- Origin: London, United Kingdom
- Genres: Post-punk, indie pop
- Years active: 2007–present
- Labels: Angular Recording Corporation, Captured Tracks
- Members: Rivka Gillieron; Sarah Datbylgu; Billy Easter
- Website: www.upsettherhythm.co.uk/wetdog.shtml

Wetdog is a London-based all-female post-punk trio, formed in the spring of 2007. The band released their first album, "Enterprise Reversal", in 2008 on Angular Records. It was followed by their second album, "Frauhaus", which was released on both Angular and on the Captured Tracks label. The first single from "Frauhaus" was "Lower Leg". The band released its third album, "Divine Times", on 4 May 2015 on Upset the Rhythm.

== Discography ==
- Enterprise Reversal (2008)
- Frauhaus (2009)
- Divine Times (2015)

== Reception ==
Many critics have compared Wetdog's sound to that of the Fall. According to Metacritic, "Frauhaus" received generally favorable reviews from critics, with a score of 64/100.
