= World Extermination =

Studio album by Insect Warfare
- Released: September 10, 2007
- Recorded: May 2007
- Studio: Red Room Studios (Houston)
- Genre: Grindcore
- Length: 22:36
- Labels: 625 Thrashcore; Earache
- Producer: Insect Warfare

Insect Warfare chronology
Evolved into Obliteration (2007)	World Extermination (2007)	Fuck HPMA (2008)

World Extermination is the only studio album by American grindcore band Insect Warfare, released on September 10, 2007, through 625 Thrashcore Records. It was later reissued by Earache Records on March 2, 2009.

== Critical reception ==
Professional ratings
Review scores
Source	Rating
AllMusic	(positive)
Blabbermouth.net	7.5/10
Metal.de	7/10
Ox-Fanzine	4/5 stars
Rock Hard	8/10

World Extermination was acclaimed upon release, and is considered an essential grindcore album. In December 2009, Terrorizer ranked the album at number 46 on their "Albums of the Decade" list. The album was inducted into Decibel magazine's "Hall of Fame" in November 2023.

== Track listing ==
1. Oxygen Corrosion - 00:53
2. Self Termination - 01:25
3. Enslaved By Machinery - 01:08
4. Manipulator - 01:49
5. Zone Killer - 00:20
6. Decontamination - 01:09
7. Street Sweeper - 00:13
8. Dead Inside - 01:01
9. Human Trafficking - 01:19
10. Hydraphobia - 01:36
11. Mind Ripper - 01:21
12. Armored Virus - 01:20
13. Mass Communication Mindfuck - 01:19
14. Nuclear Deterrence - 01:20
15. Paranoia - 01:18
16. Necessary Death - 00:51
17. Protection Maze - 00:54
18. Lobotomized - 01:18
19. Internet Era Alienation - 00:42
20. Evolved Into Obliteration - 01:12

== Personnel ==
Personnel per liner notes.

Insect Warfare

- Rahi Geramifar – vocals
- Beau Beasley – guitars
- Dobber Beverly – drums

Artwork

- Daniel Shaw – cover artwork
- Tom Tripplet – back photo
