= Bracken (band) =

English post-rock band

- Origin: Leeds, England
- Genres: Experimental rock, post-rock, electronica
- Years active: 2006–present
- Label: Anticon
- Members: Chris Adams; Shorn Keld; Stephen Hitchen
- Website: Bracken on Myspace

Bracken is an English post-rock band from Leeds, England. It started as a solo project by Hood co-founder and lead singer Chris Adams.

Bracken released the first album, We Know About the Need, on Anticon in 2007. It reached number 21 on the Dusted Top 40 Radio Chart in 2007.

== Discography ==
=== Albums ===
- We Know About the Need (Anticon, 30 January 2007)
- Exist Resist (BARO, 22 October 2014)
- High Passes (Home Assembly Music, 7 June 2016)

=== Singles ===
- "Heathens" (Anticon, 14 November 2006)

=== Limited edition albums ===
- Remixes (2007)
- They Cut Our Tapes and Clattered (2007)
- Eno About the Need (2008)

=== Remixes ===
- Themselves - "Gold Teeth Will Roll" from Crowns Down & Company (2010)
