= The Violets =

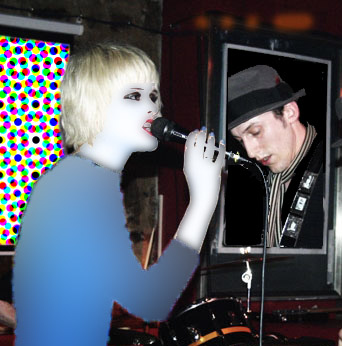
- The Violets on stage

Background information
- Origin: New Cross, London, England
- Genres: Post-punk revival, indie rock
- Years active: 2003–2008
- Label: Angular Recording Corporation
- Past members: Alexis Mary; Joe Daniel; Wolfe Riddims; Matt Gilbert

The Violets were an English post punk/indie/pop band from the New Cross area of London, England. Formed initially as a bassless garage punk trio, The Violets early gigs saw them playing stark, spiky and minimalist punk that evoked early art-school punk bands such as Delta 5, Prag Vec, and Siouxsie and the Banshees, as well as more contemporary acts such as Yeah Yeah Yeahs.

The band formed when guitarist Joe met vocalist Alexis in a tea room in Pinner, a suburb in North West London, and the pair discovered a shared affinity with emotive, brash and confrontational music. The pair soon wrote a song 'Laxteen', which was recorded in a studio owned by Scott Rosenthal in New York. Scott also played drums on the track. Upon returning to London Andrew Moran was recruited as drummer and the trio played their debut at Brixton Windmill.

Around the same time as the band was formed, guitarist Joe founded the record label Angular Recording Corporation having been inspired by Bill Drummond's book 45 and the film 24 Hour Party People. The song 'Laxteen' appeared on Angular Records first release, a compilation entitled The New Cross: An Angular Sampler.

At the start of 2007 The Violets released their most acclaimed and successful single to date, "Foreo". This song was inspired by the Alfred Hitchcock film Marnie, which featured a horse named Foreo. The band supported this release by touring with The Gossip in February, including a show at the London Astoria as part of the NME Awards Shows.

In March and April 2007 the band recorded their debut album, which was released in November 2007 on Angular. In August 2007, guitarist Joe joined Klaxons as bass player for the summer whilst Jamie Reynolds recovered from a broken ankle. In late 2007 ex-Lost Penguin member Matt Gilbert joined the band on bass guitar. The quartet toured Germany and Italy in early 2008, splitting up afterwards.

In all, they played 188 gigs across Europe, America and the UK.

== Performance style ==
The Violets' stage presence is centred on Alexis Mary and her sexy, charismatic personality. She has been likened in the underground press to a cross between Debbie Harry and Siouxsie Sioux (she rejected such claims in an interview with Maps Magazine, and their guitarist said it was lazy journalism), and she has cited the same influences they had, such as Nico, David Bowie and Diamanda Galás. However, also AllMusic noted an "uncanny" vocal similarity to Siouxsie Sioux.

The Violets' lyrics are often cryptic and abstract, laden with ambiguity and multiple meanings. In one interview with the South London Press (and reproduced on their website), Alexis replied to the interviewer on where the inspiration for the songs originates:

"Forceful thought train fuels the songs. It's frustrating trying to communicate to people that are looking for a middle road comment. I feel like I'm going to blow up in their faces. Although the words are mostly a breakdown of a harsh environment, the surge it creates is a positive and empowering feeling. We don't look for inspiration, it tends to just creep up on you."

== Critics ==
The Drowned in Sound webzine wrote that Alexis is tipped to become a "future underground icon, and critics have been very favourable about their 7" singles.

== Discography ==
=== Albums ===
- 2007 The Lost Pages (Angular Recording Corporation)

=== Singles ===
- 2005 "Feast on You/Come Home" (Filthy Little Angels)
- 2005 "Mirror Mirror" (Angular Recording Corporation)
- 2006 "Descend/Carnival " (Angular Recording Corporation)
- 2006 "Hush Away" (Angular Recording Corporation)
- 2007 "Foreo" (Angular Recording Corporation)
- 2007 "Troubles of Keneat" (Angular Recording Corporation)

== Awards ==
ArtRocker named 'The Lost pages' the 15th best album of 2007 and the single 'Foreo' the 17th best single of 2007.

== See also ==
Angular Recording Corporation (The band's history is tied up with the label)
