= Madeline (album) =

Studio album by Tickle Me Pink
- Released: September 4, 2007
- Recorded: The Blasting Room, Fort Collins, Colorado
- Genres: Punk rock, emo
- Label: Wind-up Records
- Producer: Lee Miles

Madeline is the debut album by Fort Collins band Tickle Me Pink, released on September 4, 2007, under the Wind-up Records label. It has been said that this album focuses on many major issues in today's world, including mortality, drug use, suicide, loss, brutal breakups to name but a few.

Tickle Me Pink singer Sean Kennedy had said:

"It is somewhat ironic that many of our songs deal with death and a higher purpose. We want to let the world know how short life is; embrace the ones you love and treasure each moment without regret."

Madeline was recorded in "The Blasting Room" in Fort Collins, which is the band's home town, and was produced by Lee Miles.

On the day Madeline was released, bassist/guitarist Johnny Schou died aged 22.

The song "The Time Is Wrong" is available as free downloadable content in Rock Band 2.

== Reception ==
Professional ratings
Review scores
Source	Rating
AbsolutePunk.net	(78%)
Allmusic	2.5/5 stars
PopMatters	(3/10)
PopSyndicate	(3.5/5)

AllMusic described the album as generic, stating the band's "dramatic performance doesn't have much substance to back it up."

== Track listing ==
Madeline track listing
No.	Title	Length
1.	"Typical"	3:17
2.	"The Time Is Wrong"	3:23
3.	"The Lush Life"	2:30
4.	"Madeline"	3:38
5.	"We Still Dance"	3:30
6.	"We're Not Alone"	3:30
7.	"The Answer"	4:30
8.	"I Can't Breathe"	2:57
9.	"Go Die"	3:48
10.	"Beside the Others"	4:04
11.	"Tomorrow's Ending"	5:05

== Credits ==
Tickle Me Pink

- Sean Kennedy – Lead vocals, guitar
- Johnny Schou – Bass guitar, backing vocals
- Stefan Runstrom – Drums, percussion

Artwork

- Scott Kennedy – Design, Layout Design

Production

- Lee Miles – Producer
- Andrew Berlin – Producer, engineer, mixing
- Jason Livermore – Mastering

== Charts ==
Chart (2008)	Peak position
US Top Heatseekers (Billboard)	21
