= We Know About the Need =

Studio album by Bracken
- Released: January 23, 2007
- Genre: Post-rock
- Length: 42:49
- Label: Anticon
- Producer: Bracken

Bracken chronology
We Know About the Need (2007)	Exist Resist (2014)

Singles from We Know About the Need
- 1. "Heathens" Released: November 14, 2006

Professional ratings
Aggregate scores
Source	Rating
Metacritic	72/100
Review scores
Source	Rating
AllMusic	4/5 stars
Cokemahineglow	65%
Dusted Magazine	mixed
Pitchfork	7.4/10
Stylus Magazine	B−
XLR8R	7/10

We Know About the Need is the first studio album by English post-rock band Bracken. It was released on Anticon in 2007.

== Reception ==
At Metacritic, which assigns a weighted average score out of 100 to reviews from mainstream critics, We Know About the Need received an average score of 72% based on 9 reviews, indicating "generally favorable reviews".

Marisa Brown of AllMusic said, "Bracken makes thoughtful, reflective music, like Brian Eno, or even fellow anticon labelmates Alias or cLOUDDEAD, music that refuses to sit entirely still, that attempts to convey the broad range of human emotion in the details of its composition, and, in the end, succeeds."

In December 2007, American webzine Somewhere Cold ranked We Know About the Need No. 7 on their 2007 Somewhere Cold Awards Hall of Fame.

== Track listing ==
No.	Title	Length
1.	"Of Athroll Slains"	3:54
2.	"Heathens"	4:19
3.	"(Int)"	0:06
4.	"Fight or Flight"	6:15
5.	"Safe Safe Safe"	4:30
6.	"Music for Adverts"	1:03
7.	"Evil Teeth"	6:30
8.	"Four Thousand Style"	5:39
9.	"La Monte Lament"	0:50
10.	"Many Horses"	2:32
11.	"Back on the Calder Line"	7:17
