= Weighing Souls with Sand =

Studio album by the Angelic Process
- Released: May 15, 2007
- Recorded: February–October 2006
- Studio: Metanoia Studios
- Genres: Drone metal; ambient; shoegaze
- Length: 57:34
- Label: Profound Lore Records

The Angelic Process chronology
Coma Waering (2002)	Weighing Souls with Sand (2007)

Weighing Souls with Sand is the third and final studio album by the Angelic Process.

== Background ==
The Angelic Process is a music project started by Kris Angylus in Athens, Georgia in 1999, specializing in shoegaze and doom metal music. Angylus's wife, Monica Dragynfly, joined him in 2005. According to Angylus, two of his albums, Coma Waering (2002) and Weighing Souls with Sand, were directly influenced by his experiences; his first girlfriend died in a car accident in 2000, as reflected in Coma Waering, and Weighing Souls with Sand reflects Angylus's grief and suicidal ideation following his girlfriend's death. Weighing Souls with Sand was recorded in Metanoia Studios from February–October 2006 and mastered by Black Ark Mastering, before being released on CD by Profound Lore Records on May 15, 2007. Roadburn Records released the album on vinyl on September 24, 2007, with a print run of 500 copies.

== Composition ==
Weighing Souls with Sand is the sequel to the Angelic Process's prior album Coma Waering, in which a man dies while in a coma. Weighing Souls with Sand centers around the man's wife, grieving over her husband's death before committing suicide. It has been described as drone metal, ambient, and shoegaze, heavily influenced by My Bloody Valentine. PopMatters notes that the album takes elements from multiple different bands such as Boris, Swans, Godflesh, Isis, and My Bloody Valentine.

== Reception ==
Professional ratings
Review scores
Source	Rating
Blabbermouth.net	8/10
PopMatters	8/10
Sputnikmusic	4.0/5

Weighing Souls with Sand received positive reviews. Blabbermouth.net felt that the different aspects of the album, such as the distorted melodies and vocals, combined into a "sonic excursion into raw human emotion like few others out there today."

== Track listing ==
All tracks are written by the Angelic Process.

CD release
No.	Title	Length
1.	"The Promise of Snakes"	9:32
2.	"Million Year Summer"	3:52
3.	"The Resonance of Goodbye"	5:14
4.	"We All Die Laughing"	6:05
5.	"Dying in A-minor"	8:19
6.	"Weighing Souls with Sand"	5:19
7.	"Mouvement - World Deafening Eclipse"	1:59
8.	"Burning in the Undertow of God"	6:46
9.	"The Smoke of Her Burning"	4:16
10.	Untitled (hidden track; titled "How to Build a Time Machine" on vinyl release)	5:44

Vinyl release
No.	Title	Length
10.	"How to Build a Time Machine" (bonus track)	5:44
11.	"Sleepwritten" (bonus track)	10:53

== Personnel ==
Adapted from liner notes.

- Kris Angylus – guitars, vocals, drums, textures, artwork
- Monica Dragynfly – bass, vocals, textures, artwork
