= The Angelic Process =

American drone metal duo

- Origin: Athens, Georgia, U.S.
- Genre: Drone metal
- Years active: 1999–2007
- Labels: Profound Lore, Roadburn, Burning World
- Past members: Kris Angylus; Monica Dragynfly

The Angelic Process was an American metal band from Athens, Georgia. Formed in 1999, the band was a husband and wife duo of Kris Angylus (vocals, guitar, drums) and Monica Dragynfly (bass, backing vocals). They released three albums and were seen as figureheads of the ambient drone metal subgenre.

Months after releasing their third and final album Weighing Souls with Sand, the band entered an indefinite hiatus in October 2007 as Angylus suffered a serious hand injury that left him physically incapable of performing music. Angylus died from suicide in April 2008. Dragynfly also died suddenly in 2023.

== History ==
Kris Angylus formed The Angelic Process in 1999. Following his grandmother's passing, he turned her house into a recording studio and began recording. For much of his career, Angylus said that 2001, the year the band's first album was released, was when the band formed, but he amended that statement to include the two years he spent developing its sound.

The band's first album ...And Your Blood Is Full of Honey was released in 2001 when Angylus was 22 years old. It was followed up by Coma Waering in 2003, which was recorded in 2002 and self-released until being re-issued in 2006. It tells the story of a man who falls into a coma and dies. The album was inspired by the death of Angylus' first girlfriend in a 2000 car crash. Angylus's wife Monica Dragynfly joined the band in 2005, and The Angelic Process played their first live concerts in January 2006.

On May 15, 2007, The Angelic Process' third and final album Weighing Souls with Sand was released. The concept album continues the storyline of Coma Waering, focusing on the woman struggling to live after her husband's death as she eventually kills herself as well.

In October 2007, the band entered an indefinite hiatus after Angylus seriously injured his right hand, which had previously been shattered in a car accident years ago. Angylus stated that he could no longer make music as he was physically incapable of drumming and was extremely limited on the guitar. A potential muscle reconstruction surgery would take up to two years to heal.

Angylus died on April 26, 2008, from suicide at age 29. In a statement posted on her Myspace, Dragynfly said that Angylus had clinical depression and attempted suicide multiple times before, and that he had also suffered from physical illnesses in the year prior to his death.

On September 15, 2020, Burning World Records released a 2017 remaster of Solipsistic, a promotional CD-ROM that Angylus released in 2003 in limited quantities.

Monica Dragynfly died on her birthday, April 1, 2023, at age 46. The Angelic Process' Facebook page publicized her death on May 30, 2023.

== Musical style and influences ==
Angylus described The Angelic Process' sound as "experimental tribal drone swarm" and "inspired by the likes of Swans, Neurosis and Merzbow". He believed that The Angelic Process were ahead of their time, as in 1999, in his words, "Isis had just formed, Justin Broadrick was still doing Godflesh, Sigur Ros hadn't hit yet, Mogwai were just starting to get real attention." He has cited My Bloody Valentine as an influence on the band's vocals and said that Swans inspired his usage of repetition and crescendos. Following his 1997 car crash that severely broke his right hand, Angylus was inspired by Jarboe's playing on Swans Are Dead to relearn how to play guitar right-handed.

Dragynfly said, "People think metal has to be angry, ugly or violent. But Angelic Process isn't violent. There aren't lyrics and we have textural vocals. It's pure, raw emotion."

== Band members ==
- Kris Angylus (Kristopher Fairchild) – lead vocals, guitar, drums, keyboards (1999–2007) (died 2008)
- Monica Dragynfly (Monica Henson) – bass, backing vocals, keyboards (2005–2007) (died 2023)

== Discography ==
=== Studio albums ===
- ...And Your Blood Is Full of Honey (2001)
- Coma Waering (2003)
- Weighing Souls with Sand (2007)

=== Extended plays ===
- Sigh (2006)
- We All Die Laughing (2006)

=== Promotional albums ===
- Solipsistic (2003)

=== Appearances ===
- Track A10 'Blood Tastes Like Rain' on 'Let There Be Life: A compilation of various artists to benefit cancer awareness' released by Voiceprint Records (2008)
