= Tickle Me Pink =

American rock band

- Origin: Fort Collins, Colorado
- Genres: Alternative rock, emo
- Years active: 2005–2011, 2016
- Label: Wind-up Records
- Members: Sean Kennedy; Stefan Runstrom; Steven Beck; Joey Barba
- Past members: Johnny Schou
- Website: www.ticklemepinkrock.com

Tickle Me Pink was an American rock band from Fort Collins, Colorado, signed to Wind-Up Records. The band was made up of Sean Kennedy (lead vocals, bass guitar), Stefan Runstrom (drums), Joey Barba (guitar) and Steven Beck (guitar, vocals). After independently releasing their first two EPs, If Only We Were Twenty One and Up (2005) and Half Seas Over (2006), the band released its first album, Madeline, on July 1, 2008. The album's release coincided with the death of bassist Johnny Schou, reportedly due to a heroin overdose. Schou was replaced by Joey Barba, a longtime friend of the band.

Tickle Me Pink officially played their last show together on March 5, 2011. The band left a Twitter message to their fans the following day saying, "Farewell all. We love you and will never forget you. -TMP". Kennedy then assembled a new band, Talisker Skye, and both Beck and Runstrom have played in the Wiredogs.

The band announced two reunion shows in August 2016, one at Fort Collins' annual Bohemian Nights at NewWestFest.

== National exposure ==
The video for the band's first single, "Typical", was premiered on MTV2 Unleashed on August 4, 2008. The video was directed by Christopher Sims. The song has become popular in Colorado due to increased airplay on 93.3 KTCL. The band opened for Hawthorne Heights on their fall headlining tour in 2008. The members from Hawthorne Heights claim to have asked Tickle Me Pink to join the tour in part due to a sense of shared loss, having lost a band member, Casey Calvert, themselves the previous year.

Their song "The Time Is Wrong" is used as downloadable content for Rock Band 2, which is also compatible with its predecessor, Rock Band.

== Discography ==
- If Only We Were Twenty One and Up (2005, GDR Records, EP)
- Half Seas Over (2006, GDR Records, EP)
- Madeline (2008, Wind-up Records) (No. 21 Billboard Top Heatseekers)
- On Your Way Down (2010, independent, EP)
