= Insect Warfare =

American grindcore band

- Origin: Houston, Texas, U.S.
- Genres: Grindcore, deathgrind
- Years active: 2004–2008/2025-present (Reunions: 2009, 2016, 2017)
- Labels: 625 Thrashcore; Earache
- Past members: Rahi Geramifar; Beau Beasley; Frank Faerman; Alex Hughes; Neal Dossey; Dobber Beverly; Chris Grenfell
- Website: insectwarfare.blogspot.com

Insect Warfare is an American grindcore band from Houston, Texas.

== History ==
Insect Warfare was originally founded in 2000 as a solo project of vocalist Rahi Geramifar, before turning into a proper band in 2004. The band's original lineup consisted of Geramifar, drummer Frank Faerman, and guitarists Neal Dossey and Beau Beasely. Although he was not a founding member, Beasley would quickly become the band's primary songwriter. In October 2006, the band replaced Faerman with Dobber Beverly.

Insect Warfare's only full-length album, World Extermination, was released on September 10, 2007, through 625 Thrashcore Records. The band recorded the album in a single day. At the 2007 Houston Press Music Awards, Insect Warfare's set was cut short after only five minutes by the sound engineer. This incident led to the release of the Fuck HPMA EP in early 2008. In December 2007, Insect Warfare released two unmastered songs, "Information Economy" and "Cancer of Oppression", through their MySpace page. In early 2008, the band toured Australia with Agents of Abhorrence. Insect Warfare would break up following their performance at the Dude Festival in Indianapolis on June 21, 2008, owing to Beasley's exhaustion with the band.

Following their disbandment, Insect Warfare posthumously released a split EP with Agoraphobic Nosebleed on November 4, 2008. Interest in World Extermination grew slowly after its initial release, prompting several record labels to offer to reissue the album. Beasley rejected most of these offers until he was encouraged by Digby Pearson to sign with Earache Records. Earache subsequently reissued the album on March 2, 2009. In October 2009, Insect Warfare toured the United Kingdom and Ireland. Days before the tour was to begin, Germafir pulled out and Chris Grenfell, vocalist of the bands Carmen and The Ergon Carousal, was brought in as his replacement. In December 2009, Terrorizer ranked World Extermination at number 46 on their "Albums of the Decade" list.

In January 2016, Insect Warfare reunited with Geramifar. They played a reunion show in Houston on July 2, 2016, prior to (what was announced as) their final performance ever at the Obscene Extreme festival in Trutnov, Czech Republic, on July 15, 2016. Despite this, Insect Warfare reformed once more to play their final show in May 2017.

== Musical style and influences ==
Beasely cited albums such as Napalm Death's From Enslavement to Obliteration and Discordance Axis' Jouhou as influences.

== Band members ==
Final lineup

- Rahi Geramifar – vocals (2004–2008, 2016, 2017)
- Beau Beasley – guitars, studio bass, noise pedals (2004–2009, 2016, 2017)
- Dobber Beverly – drums (2006–2009, 2016, 2017)
- Alex Hughes – touring bassist (2007–2008, 2016, 2017)

Past members

- Neal Dossey – guitars (2004–2006)
- Frank Faerman – drums (2004–2006)
- Chris Grenfell – vocals (2009)

== Discography ==
Studio albums

- World Extermination (2007)

Compilation albums

- Endless Execution Thru Violent Restitution (2006)
- Entomological Siege 2004/2009 (2019)

EPs

- At War With Grindcore (2005)
- Evolved into Obliteration (2007)
- Fuck HPMA (2008)
- Noise Grind Power Death (2009)

Split EPs

- Insect Warfare / Hatred Surge (2006)
- Boltstein / Insect Warfare (2006)
- Insect Warfare / Carcass Grinder (2007)
- Insect Warfare / Agoraphobic Nosebleed (2008)
- Flagitious Idiosyncrasy in the Dilapidation / Insect Warfare (2009)
- Napalm Death / Insect Warfare (2013)

Demos

- Gulf Coast Infestation (2004)
