= Angular Recording Corporation =

British independent record label

- Founded: 2003
- Founder: Joe Daniel, Joe Margetts
- Defunct: 2012
- Country of origin: United Kingdom
- Location: London
- Official website: Angular Store

Angular Recording Corporation was an independent record label founded in New Cross, South East London. It was established in June 2003 by two ex-Goldsmiths College students, Joe Daniel and Joe Margetts, who reclaimed a local Ordnance Survey Triangulation Station and made it their first artefact: ARC 001.

The label's founders were influenced by a love of angular pop music and the Manchester label Factory Records. Gaining funding through medical testing, Angular Recording Corporation was able to finance its debut release in November 2003, the NME-championed The New Cross : An Angular Sampler, making it the lead review in the magazine.

In the 2011 England riots, the label lost all its stock and entire back catalogue in the PIAS warehouse fire.

An Angular Store website remains active.

== Discography ==
Catalogue number	Artist	Title	Release date
ARC 001	Angular Recording Corporation	Ordnance Survey Trig Point	1 Jun 2003
ARC 002	Various artists	The New Cross: An Angular Sampler (compilation)	25 Nov 2003
ARC 003	Angular Recording Corporation	The Thrasher: An Angular Raffle	
ARC 004	Various artists	Rip Off Your Labels: More Angular Product (comp)	28 Jun 2004
ARC 005	Elizabeth Harper	Elizabeth Harper (album)	29 Nov 2004
ARC 006	The Fucks	EP One	15 Nov 2004
ARC 007	The Long Blondes	Giddy Stratospheres (single)	29 Nov 2004
ARC 008	The Violets	Mirror Mirror (single)	18 Apr 2005
ARC 009	The Long Blondes	Appropriation (single)	20 Jun 2005
ARC 010	Angular Recording Corporation	Trig Point 5488	
ARC 011	The Violets	Descend/Carnival (single)	6 Feb 2006
ARC 012	Klaxons	Gravity's Rainbow (single)	27 Mar 2006
ARC 014	The Lodger	Let Her Go (single)	1 May 2006
ARC 015	The Violets	Hush Away (single)	21 Aug 2006
ARC 016	These New Puritans	Now Pluvial (EP)	30 Oct 2006
ARC 017	Various artists	Future Love Songs (compilation)	27 Nov 2006
ARC 018	Angular Recording Corporation	Website	
ARC 019	Angular Recording Corporation	Office	
ARC 020	Angular Recording Corporation	Trig Point 5486	
ARC 021	The Violets	Foreo (single)	12 Feb 2007
ARC 022	Angular Recording Corporation	The Townace	
ARC 023	These New Puritans	Navigate, Navigate (single)	31 Mar 2007
ARC 024	The Lodger	Kicking Sand (single)	4 Jun 2007
ARC 025	The Lodger	Grown-Ups (album)	11 Jun 2007
ARC 026	The Violets	Troubles of Keneat (single)	1 Oct 2007
ARC 027	These New Puritans	Numbers/Colours (single)	28 Oct 2007
ARC 028	The Violets	The Lost Pages (album)	5 Nov 2007
ARC 029	Various artists	A Free Angular Sampler (EP)	1 Oct 2008
ARC 030	Angular Recording Corporation	Trig Point 6611	
ARC 031	Findo Gask	Va Va Va (single)	24 Mar 2008
ARC 032	These New Puritans	Beat Pyramid (album)	28 Jan 2008
ARC 033	Navvy	4 Songs (EP)	3 Mar 2008
ARC 034	These New Puritans	Elvis (single)	11 Feb 2008
ARC 035	These New Puritans	Swords of Truth (single)	28 Apr 2008
ARC 036	Wetdog	Zah und Zaheet (single)	7 Jul 2008
ARC 037	Wetdog	Enterprise Reversal (album)	28 Jul 2008
ARC 038	The Long Blondes	Singles (album)	20 Oct 2008
ARC 039	Findo Gask	One Eight Zero (single)	8 Dec 2008
ARC 040	Angular Recording Corporation	Trig Point 1385	
ARC 041	Je Suis Animal	Self-Taught Magic from a Book (album)	1 Dec 2008
ARC 042	Je Suis Animal	The Mystery of Marie Roget (single)	1 Feb 2009
ARC 043	Crystal Stilts	Departure (single)	9 Feb 2009
ARC 044	Crystal Stilts	Alight of Night	16 Feb 2009
ARC 045	Angular Recording Corporation	Angular T-shirt	
ARC 046	Gyratory System	Barons Court Turret (single)	23 Feb 2009
ARC 047	Navvy	Disco (single)	9 Mar 2009
ARC 048	Navvy	Idyll Intangible (album)	16 Mar 2009
ARC 049	The Vichy Government	Carrion Camping (album)	2 Mar 2009
ARC 050	Angular Recording Corporation	Angular enamel badge	
ARC 051	The Vichy Government	Whores in Taxis (album)	16 Mar 2009
ARC 052	The Vichy Government	White Elephant (album)	29 Mar 2009
ARC 053	The Vichy Government	Vanity Publishing (album)	13 Apr 2009
ARC 054	Crystal Stilts	Love is a Wave (single)	25 May 2009
ARC 055	The Vichy Government	The Man Delusion (single)	August 1988
ARC 056	Gyratory System	The Sound-Board Breathes (album)	26 Oct 2009
ARC 057	Angular Recording Corporation	Spotify playlist	
ARC 058	Gyratory System	Cargo Cult (single)	17 Aug 2009
ARC 059	Gyratory System	Sea Containers House (single)	21 Oct 2009
ARC 060	Angular Recording Corporation	An Angular hamper	31 July 2010
ARC 061	Angular Recording Corporation	Angular badge	
ARC 062	Wetdog	Lower Leg (single)	2 Nov 2009
ARC 063	Wetdog	Frauhaus! (album)	30 Nov 2009
ARC 064	These New Puritans	We Want War (single)	12 Jan 2010
ARC 065	These New Puritans	Hidden (album)	18 Jan 2010
ARC 066	Gyratory System	Yowser Yowser Yowser (EP)	22 Feb 2010
ARC 067	Various artists	Cold Waves & Minimal Electronics, Vol. 1 (album)	9 Mar 2010
ARC 068	Wetdog	Wymmin's Final (single)	10 May 2010
ARC 069	E. Gold feat. Alexis	Separate our Hearts (EP)	26 Jul 2010
ARC 071	Gyratory System	Yowser Yowser Yowser remixes (single)	22 Mar 2010
ARC 072	These New Puritans	Attack Music (single)	19 Apr 2010
ARC 073	Gyratory System	Pamplona (single)	15 Jun 2010
ARC 074	Angular Recording Corporation	Angular badge	17 May 2010
ARC 075	David Westlake	Play Dusty For Me (album)	5 Jul 2010
ARC 076	These New Puritans	Hologram (single)	10 Aug 2010
ARC 077	Tim Key	Tim Key. With a String Quartet. On a Boat. (album)	8 Nov 2010
ARC 078	Ruth	Polaroïd/Roman/Photo (album)	22 Nov 2010
ARC 079	These New Puritans	Hidden remixes (EP)	15 Nov 2010
ARC 080	Angular Recording Corporation	Trig Point 3220	25 Aug 2012
ARC 081	Angular Recording Corporation	Independent label market, Berwick Street (artefact)	21 May 2011
ARC 082	Gyratory System	New Harmony (single)	4 Apr 2011
ARC 083	Gyratory System	New Harmony (album)	18 Apr 2011
ARC 084	This Many Boyfriends	Young Lovers Go Pop! (single)	22 Aug 2011
ARC 085	Fresh Touch	The Ethiopian (12" EP)	27 Feb 2012
ARC 086	Angular Recording Corporation	Independent label market, Brooklyn (artefact)	8 Oct 2011
ARC 087	Angular Recording Corporation	An Angular Nudge Pot (artefact)	10 Dec 2011
ARC 088	Angular Recording Corporation	Independent label market, Spitalfields	10 Dec 2011
ARC 089	Angular Recording Corporation	An Angular Tombola (artefact)	10 Dec 2011
ARC 091	This Many Boyfriends	Starling (single)	20 Feb 2012
ARC 092	Eleven Pond	Watching Trees (12" EP)	23 Apr 2012
ARC 093	This Many Boyfriends	I Should Be A Communist (single)	21 May 2012
ARC 094	Angular Recording Corporation	Independent label market, London	19 May 2012
ARC 096	This Many Boyfriends	Number One (single)	1 Oct 2012
ARC 097	This Many Boyfriends	This Many Boyfriends (album)	8 Oct 2012

== Samplers ==
The first two Angular samplers launched the careers of a number of bands, including: Art Brut, Bloc Party and The Long Blondes.

ARC 002: The New Cross

- Bloc Party - "The Marshals Are Dead"
- The Fairies Band - "Pink Socks Rock"
- The Vichy Government - "Make Love to the Camera"
- Nemo - "Picadilly in Sepia"
- The Violets - "Laxteen"
- Luxembourg - "Making Progress"
- The Swear - "High Rise"
- Elizabeth Harper - "Don Juan"
- Lovers of Today - "Guy Fawkes"
- Art Brut - "Formed a Band"
- Lady Fuzz - "What's it Worth?"
- Gifthorse - "You Save my Life, I'll Ruin Yours"
- The Bridge - "First Frenzy"
- Mark Sampson - "The London Eye"

ARC 004: Rip Off Your Labels

- The Vichy Government - "I Control Discourse"
- The Violets - "Stealer"
- Art Brut - "Top of the Pops"
- The Fucks - "Argos"
- The Long Blondes - "Autonomy Boy"
- Showboys - "Factory"
- The Swear - "Advert Boy"
- The Boyfriends - "No Tomorrow"
- Elizabeth Harper - "Trouble in the Palace"
- Gifthorse - "Happy Daggers"
- Lovers of Today - "A Short Nasty Shock"
- Luxembourg - "Let Us Have It"
- The Rocks - "We Got It (Galen Remix)"
