= Fluorescent Grey =

EP by Deerhunter
- Released: May 8, 2007
- Recorded: July 2006
- Studios: Radium Studios, Athens, Georgia
- Genre: Indie rock
- Length: 16:15
- Label: Kranky
- Producer: Chris Bishop

Deerhunter chronology
Cryptograms (2007)	Fluorescent Grey (2007)	Microcastle (2008)

Vinyl cover

Fluorescent Grey is an extended play accompaniment to Cryptograms, the second studio release by Atlanta-based band Deerhunter. The EP was released on CD by Kranky on May 8, 2007, and later as a vinyl bundle with Cryptograms. A music video for the track "Strange Lights" is included with the CD release. The album's cover is a photograph of Deerhunter guitarist Lockett Pundt as a seventh-grader.

The EP's lyrical themes touch on death and the decomposition of the human body—"Fluorescent Grey" is the name lead singer Bradford Cox gives to the color of dead flesh. Fluorescent Grey received a number of positive reviews upon its release. Cox later released a free series of demos over the internet, being early versions of tracks on Fluorescent Grey and other material.

== Music and lyrics ==
Unlike Cryptograms, Fluorescent Grey does not contain any ambient tracks. Lead singer Bradford Cox considers the EP's four tracks to be "four singles; they're all four good. They could stand on their own." The songs were recorded while Cryptograms was being mixed; their sound has been described as "tightly song-focused, not as drifting or dreamy" as Cryptograms. Cox had considered including these tracks on the next Deerhunter record instead of releasing them on their own. However, he wanted the band's next album to be "something totally different" from Cryptograms and Fluorescent Grey.

As with Cryptograms, Cox did not write the lyrics to the band's music in advance, instead singing stream-of-consciousness. The lyrics of Fluorescent Grey carry themes of death and the decomposition of the human body. Cox used the term "Fluorescent Grey"—also the title of the EP's opening track—to describe the color of decaying flesh. He has described the lyrics of the song as being "about panic attacks, lust, and existential dread." "Dr. Glass", in which Cox sings of "so many useless bodies…in the world", is characterized as "more existential dread on a global scale". Cox has said that the EP's third track, "Like New," is "about waking up one day after a long period of depression and finding the world somehow more bearable and kind of ‘new’ and exciting again." The fourth and final song on Fluorescent Grey, "Wash Off," describes Cox's encounters with an "uppity hippie kid" who sold him counterfeit acid as a teenager, insisting that Cox was not open-minded enough for the drug to affect him. As the song ends, Cox repeats the phrase "I was sixteen".

== Demo releases ==
In January 2008, Cox released a collection of nine tracks entitled Fluorescent Grey Demos & Out-takes as a free download on the Deerhunter blog. The release includes early demos of tracks from Fluorescent Grey as well as other unreleased material. The first three tracks, "Fluorescent Grey," "Dr. Glass," and "Like New," were recorded over one afternoon, created in an attempt "to better refine the songs" for their eventual release. Cox wrote on the Deerhunter blog that he "especially like[s]" this early version of "Dr. Glass," as he feels the band did not adequately capture "the atmosphere and creepiness" he desired for the song's final incarnation. The fourth track is a version of "Wash Off" recorded by Cox alone in December 2003. "Greyscale," recorded February 2006, is the original version of a track remixed for its release on Deerhunter 7", a split album recorded for Rob's House Records. The remix was done by band member Josh Fauver.

"Kousin Klash" and "So Many Bodies" served as the framework for tracks on Fluorescent Grey. Cox recorded "So Many Bodies" after experiencing a panic attack induced by a photograph he saw in The New York Times, showing an Iraqi girl hunched over her dead mother's corpse. "I started thinking about bodies and rotting and brutal violent human stuff, wars, all this terrible stuff from history…and literally hid under my sheets, sweating. I made this tape later that night." "Axis I (F.Grey)" is a track originally released on Atlas Sound/Mexcellent Split in 2007. "People Never No" is a sketch that later developed into the song "Fluorescent Grey"; in recording the song, Cox was inspired by the bands The Breeders and The Fall, and "obsessed with having two drum tracks on everything".

== Reception ==
Professional ratings
Review scores
Source	Rating
AllMusic	3.5/5 stars
Drowned in Sound	(8/10)
Glorious Noise	(recommended)
No Ripcord	(6/10)
Pitchfork	(8.8/10)
PopMatters	(9/10)
Prefix Magazine	(8.5/10)
Tiny Mix Tapes	(3.5/5)

Fluorescent Grey was given a score of 8.8/10 by Pitchfork, as well as the publication's "Best New Music" accolade. Pitchfork writer Marc Hogan considered the EP "clearer and less abrasive than Cryptograms musically," and "a triumphant document of a stubbornly visionary young band with the world still spread out before them." Mike Diver of Drowned In Sound called Fluorescent Grey Deerhunter "at their most relaxed". He found the EP's musical style to be a "delightful deviation" from Cryptograms, as it gives listeners an opportunity to step "back from all things fiery and furious" characterized by that album. PopMatters music critic Josh Berquist wrote of the EP's opening track, pointing out the contrast of Cox's "lucid reflection on loss…[and] the morbid imagery of bodies in decay" sung "over an incongruously bright and chiming rhythm", which he found made "such beautiful invitations to bloody eviscerations unnervingly captivating."

Jeff Klingman of Prefix Magazine considered the final track of Fluorescent Grey, "Wash Off", to be the only song which "channel[s] the aggression that peppers Cryptograms' first half." Klingman found Cox to be preoccupied with his past within this song's lyrics, "suggesting an unhealthy disconnect above and beyond wistful remembrance." In his review for Tiny Mix Tapes, writer Chris Ruen said that Fluorescent Grey "is a bit rushed" in terms of structure, which he feels "detracts from one of Deerhunter’s particular strengths: constructing a dynamic, organic listening experience." David Coleman of No Ripcord called the EP "a less thrilling ride than Cryptograms," and that while "There are plenty of good ideas, not to mention a great guitar sound...the band chooses to wrap it up early rather than kick back and explore these [ideas] further."

== Track listing ==
All songs written by Bradford Cox, except where noted.

1. "Fluorescent Grey" – 5:02
2. "Dr. Glass" – 3:14
3. "Like New" (music by Lockett Pundt) – 2:13
4. "Wash Off" (music by Archuleta, Cox, Fauver, Mee, Pundt) – 5:46

== Personnel ==
- Bradford Cox – guitar, vocals, bass drum, gong, tapes, keys, piano
- Moses Archuleta – drums, percussion
- Joshua Fauver – bass
- Colin Mee – guitar, tapes, percussion
- Lockett Pundt – guitars
- Nicolas Vernhes – mixing
- Jennifer Munson – mastering
