= Yung Joc discography =

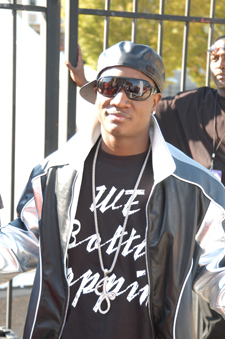
- Studio albums: 2
- Singles: 7
- Mixtapes: 6
- Featured singles: 13

This is the discography of Yung Joc, an American rapper.

== Albums ==
=== Studio albums ===
List of studio albums, with selected chart positions and certifications
Title	Album details	Peak chart positions			Certifications
Title	Album details	US	US R&B	US Rap	Certifications
New Joc City	Released: June 6, 2006; Label: Block, Bad Boy South, Atlantic; Format: CD, LP, digital download	3	1	1	RIAA: Gold
Hustlenomics	Released: August 28, 2007; Label: Block, Bad Boy South, Atlantic; Format: CD, LP, digital download	3	1	1	
"—" denotes items that did not chart or were not released.

== Mixtapes ==
Title	Mixtape details
Joc of Spades	Released: 2006; Label: Self-released; Format: Digital download
Joc Is Back	Released: 2008; Label: Self-released; Format: Digital download
The Grind Flu	Released: 2009; Label: Self-released; Format: Digital download
Swagg Team Mafia: The Movie	Released: 2010; Label: Swagg Team; Format: Digital download
Ready to Fly	Released: 2011; Label: Swagg Team; Format: Digital download
Bitch Im Joc	Released: 2012; Label: Swagg Team; Format: Digital download

== Singles ==
=== As lead artist ===
List of singles as lead artist, with selected chart positions and certifications, showing year released and album name
Title	Year	Peak chart positions					Certifications	Album
Title	Year	US	US R&B	US Rap	UK	UK R&B	Certifications	Album
"It's Goin' Down"	2006	3	1	1	191	24	RIAA: 3× Platinum	New Joc City
"I Know You See It" (featuring Ms. B)	2006	17	5	2	—	—	RIAA: Platinum	New Joc City
"1st Time" (featuring Marques Houston and Trey Songz)	2006	82	15	11	—	—	RIAA: Gold	New Joc City
"Coffee Shop" (featuring Gorilla Zoe)	2007	78	39	23	—	—		Hustlenomics
"Bottle Poppin'" (featuring Gorilla Zoe)	2007	—	59	—	—	—		Hustlenomics
"Yeah Boy"	2010	—	80	—	—	—		Mr. Robinson's Neighborhood
"I Know What She Like" (featuring Yo Gotti and Stuey Rock)	2011	—	91	—	—	—		Mr. Robinson's Neighborhood
"Mollie" (featuring T-Pain)	2012	—	—	—	—	—		Mr. Robinson's Neighborhood
"I Got Bitches" (featuring AE200 and D Dro)	2014	—	—	—	—	—		Mr. Robinson's Neighborhood
"Features" (featuring T-Pain)	2014	—	—	—	—	—		Mr. Robinson's Neighborhood
"Wrong Places"	2016	—	—	—	—	—		Mr. Robinson's Neighborhood
"Perfect Timing" (featuring Gunna and B. Smyth)	2019	—	—	—	—	—		Mr. Robinson's Neighborhood
"—" denotes a recording that did not chart or was not released in that territory.

=== As featured artist ===
List of singles, with selected chart positions
Title	Year	Peak chart positions												Certifications	Album
Title	Year	US	US R&B	US Rap	AUT	CAN	CZH	FRE	GER	JPN	NWZ	PTG	UK	Certifications	Album
"I Love You" (Cheri Dennis featuring Jim Jones and Yung Joc)	2006	—	38	—	—	—	—	—	—	—	—	—	—		In and Out of Love
"Show Stopper" (Danity Kane featuring Yung Joc)	2006	8	33	—	60	—	—	—	27	—	—	—	—		Danity Kane
"Zoom" (Lil Boosie featuring Yung Joc)	2006	61	25	14	—	—	—	—	—	—	—	—	—		Bad Azz
"In the Hood" (Trae featuring Yung Joc and Big Pokey)	2006	—	64	—	—	—	—	—	—	—	—	—	—		Restless
"Buy U a Drank (Shawty Snappin')" (T-Pain featuring Yung Joc)	2007	1	1	—	18	25	—	—	—	—	2	39	2	RIAA: 7× Platinum; BPI: Platinum	Epiphany
"5000 Ones" (DJ Drama featuring Nelly, T.I., Yung Joc, Willie the Kid, Young Jeezy, and Twista)	2007	—	73	—	—	—	—	—	—	—	—	—	—		Gangsta Grillz: The Album
"Portrait of Love" (Cheri Dennis featuring Yung Joc and Gorilla Zoe)	2007	—	55	—	—	—	—	—	—	—	—	—	—		In and Out of Love
"Killa" (Cherish featuring Yung Joc)	2007	39	53	—	—	—	10	91	—	45	18	—	52		The Truth
"Lookin Boy" (Hotstylz featuring Yung Joc)	2008	47	11	9	—	—	—	—	—	—	—	—	—		Non-album single
"Get Like Me" (David Banner featuring Chris Brown and Yung Joc)	2008	16	7	2	—	—	—	—	—	—	—	—	—		The Greatest Story Ever Told
"So Fly" (Slim featuring Shawty Lo and Yung Joc)	2008	49	8	18	—	—	—	—	—	—	—	—	—		Love's Crazy
"Beep" (Bobby V featuring Yung Joc)	2008	55	6	—	—	—	—	—	—	—	—	—	—		The Rebirth
"Imma Put It on Her" (Day26 featuring Yung Joc and Diddy)	2009	79	29	—	—	—	—	—	—	—	—	—	—		Forever in a Day
"Big Shot" (Kane & Abel featuring Yung Joc)	2010	—	—	—	—	—	—	—	—	—	—	—	—		Non-album single
"Fucking Around (Like This)" (YC featuring Yung Joc and Nephew)	2012	—	—	—	—	—	—	—	—	—	—	—	—		Got Racks
"In That Order" (Momma Dee featuring Yung Joc)	2016	—	—	—	—	—	—	—	—	—	—	—	—		Non-album single

== Guest appearances ==
List of non-single guest appearances, with other performing artists, showing year released and album name
Title	Year	Other artist(s)	Album
"Me & U (Remix)"	2006	Cassie, Diddy	—N/a
"Yeah (Remix)"	2006	Big Kuntry King, T.I.	Grand Hustle Presents: In da Streetz Volume 4
"Touching Everything"	2006	Lil Scrappy	Bred 2 Die · Born 2 Live
"Clap On"	2007	8Ball & MJG	Ridin High
"Throw Aways"	2007	Trae, Gorilla Zoe	Life Goes On
"Booty Bangs"	2007	Jessi Malay	—N/a
"Get Money"	2007	Candy Pye	—N/a
"Don't Know How to Act"	2008	Flo Rida	Mail on Sunday
"Hit the Floor"	2008	Bohagon	Crunk In HD
"Maserati"	2008	Diamond, Teairra Mari	—N/a
"U Can't"	2008	One Chance	—N/a
"I'm a Beast"	2009	Pleasure P	The Introduction of Marcus Cooper
"Stripclub"	2010	Donell Jones	Lyrics
"Do It B.I.G."	2010	Game	Brake Lights
"Club Walmart"	2010	Kia Shine	—N/a
"Address"	2011	Dolla Boy	—N/a
"Respect My Name"	2011	Gucci Mane	Brick Squad Mafia
"Bineh"	2011	JC	Earcandy
"Left Lane"	2011	Cabby	—N/a
"Checked Up"	2012	Cannible	The Repast
"Choppin'"	2015	Young Kavy	—N/a
"Sephia"	2016	Young Pari$	—N/a
"Wait"	2017	Stefon4u	—N/a
"Paper Scissors Rocks"	2018	High Defynition	Nothing Is By Chance
"Tongue Out"	2018	Don Baller	—N/a
