= 1st Time =

Single by Yung Joc featuring Marques Houston and Trey Songz

from the album New Joc City
- Released: November 2006 (US)
- Recorded: 2006
- Genre: Hip hop; R&B
- Length: 4:27
- Label: Bad Boy South; Block; Atlantic
- Songwriters: Robinson; Jasiel/Thorton; Carlos/Benny Tillman

Yung Joc singles chronology
"Show Stopper" (2006)	"1st Time" (2006)	"Zoom" (2006)

"1st Time" is a rap single by rapper Yung Joc. It is the third single released off his debut album New Joc City. The single features Trey Songz and Marques Houston. The song failed to be as successful as "It's Goin' Down", "I Know You See It", or "Dope Boy Magic". It premiered on BET's Access Granted on Wednesday November 1, 2006, and is receiving growing air and video play. The video features Eightball & MJG, Doug E. Fresh, Gorilla Zoe, Jody Breeze and Trey Songz.

The lyrics are based on a woman having a sexual experience for the first time with a man. Controversy sparked because the song was originally written by a teenage songwriter "Lil Will" under Jermaine Dupri's So So Def Imprint.

The song debuted on the Billboard Hot 100 at number 93 in February 2007. On March 2, the song returned to the charts at number 97 and has thus far peaked at number 82.

== Charts ==
=== Weekly charts ===
Chart (2006–2007)	Peak position
US Billboard Hot 100	82
US Hot R&B/Hip-Hop Songs (Billboard)	15
US Hot Rap Songs (Billboard)	11

=== Year-end charts ===
Chart (2007)	Position
US Hot R&B/Hip-Hop Songs (Billboard)	65

== Certifications ==
Region	Certification	Certified units/sales
United States (RIAA)	Gold	500,000^{^}
^{^} Shipments figures based on certification alone.
