= Welcome to the Zoo =

Studio album by Gorilla Zoe
- Released: September 25, 2007
- Recorded: 2006–07
- Studios: McKoy St. Studios (Atlanta, GA); The Hit Factory Criteria (Miami, FL); Funkshop Studio (Atlanta, GA)
- Genre: Hip-hop
- Length: 1:02:48
- Labels: Block; Bad Boy South; Atlantic
- Producers: Canei Finch; Chris Flame; Dee Jay Dana; DOA; Drumma Boy; Fatboi; Flawda Water; Jay Mac; Lazyboi; Mike The Track Blazer; Willie "Chuck" Shivers; Win

Gorilla Zoe chronology
Welcome to the Zoo (2007)	Don't Feed da Animals (2009)

Singles from Welcome to the Zoo
- 1. "Hood Nigga" Released: April 24, 2007; 2. "Juice Box" Released: March 18, 2008

Welcome to the Zoo is the debut solo studio album by American rapper Gorilla Zoe. It was released on September 25, 2007, via Block Entertainment/Bad Boy South. Recording sessions took place at McKoy St. Studios and Funkshop Studio in Atlanta, and the Hit Factory Criteria in Miami. Production was handled by Drumma Boy, Dee Jay Dana, Jay Mac, Canei Finch, Chris Flame, DOA, Fatboi, Flawda Water, Lazyboi, Mike The Track Blazer, Willie "Chuck" Shivers and Win. It features guest appearances from Boyz n da Hood, Yung Joc, Block, D. Woods and JC.

The album debuted at number 18 on the Billboard 200, number 8 on the Top R&B/Hip-Hop Albums and number 3 on the Top Rap Albums, selling 35,000 copies in its first week in the United States. The album was supported by two singles: "Hood Figga", which peaked at number 38 on the Billboard Hot 100 and number 13 on the Hot R&B/Hip-Hop Songs, and "Juice Box", which made it to number 78 on the Hot R&B/Hip-Hop Songs.

== Critical reception ==
Professional ratings
Review scores
Source	Rating
AllMusic	3/5 stars
RapReviews	6/10
Robert Christgau	(choice cut)
XXL	L (3/5)

Welcome to the Zoo received mixed reviews from music critics. AllMusic's Jason Birchmeier said that the album was well-produced but criticized Zoe for being too similar to Young Jeezy, saying that "Jeezy can be witty and adorns his raps with a signature array of ad libs". Steve 'Flash' Juon of RapReviews praised Gorilla for his voice and humorous lyrics but felt he was being dragged by the typical hip-hop clichés, concluding that "Welcome to the Zoo proves that Zoe has star potential - it's just that he may have been shoved into the spotlight prematurely". Maurice G. Garland of XXL stated: "unfortunately, Gorilla throws a monkey wrench in his trap jam with a barrage of frivolous fare". Robert Christgau cited "Money Man", "Take Your Shoes Off" and "Do Something" as "choice cuts".

== Track listing ==
No.	Title	Writer(s)	Producer(s)	Length
1.	"Do Something"	Alonzo Mathis; Christopher Gholson	Drumma Boy	4:40
2.	"Hood Nigga"	Mathis; Dana Ramey; Chris Ussery	Dee Jay Dana; Chris Flame	3:20
3.	"Money Man"	Mathis; Michael Armour, Jr.	Mike The Track Blazer	4:08
4.	"Tryna Make a Jug" (featuring Big Gee)	Mathis; Miguel Scott; LaDamon Douglas	Fatboi	4:10
5.	"Crack Muzik (This That Muzik)" (featuring Jody Breeze)	Mathis; Jacoby White; Gholson	Drumma Boy	4:36
6.	"Battle Field" (featuring Block and Big Gee)	Mathis; Russell Spencer; Scott; Ramey	Dee Jay Dana	3:55
7.	"Take Your Shoes Off" (featuring Yung Joc)	Mathis; Jasiel Robinson; Derek Allen; Saleem Asad	DOA; Lazyboi	4:25
8.	"I Know"	Mathis; Lester Purnell	Flawda Water	4:47
9.	"Count on Me" (featuring Jody Breeze and JC)	Mathis; White; Justin Crowder; James Beard	Jay Mac	4:04
10.	"Real Motherfucka" (performed by Boyz n da Hood)	Mathis; Scott; White; Lee Dixon; Beard	Jay Mac	5:04
11.	"Juice Box" (featuring Yung Joc)	Mathis; Robinson; Gholson	Drumma Boy	4:09
12.	"Money Up"	Mathis; Kenwin Gates	Win	3:37
13.	"You Don't Know Me" (featuring D. Woods)	Mathis; Wanita Woodgett; William Shivers	Willie "Chuck" Shivers	3:28
14.	"Lil Shawty"	Mathis; Gholson	Drumma Boy	4:09
15.	"Last Time I Checked"	Mathis; Canei Finch; Michael Clervoix	Canei Finch	4:16
Total length:				1:02:48

== Charts ==
Chart (2007)	Peak position
US Billboard 200	18
US Top R&B/Hip-Hop Albums (Billboard)	8
US Top Rap Albums (Billboard)	3
