= Hood Nigga =

Single by Gorilla Zoe

from the album Welcome to the Zoo
- Released: April 24, 2007
- Recorded: 2006
- Genre: Gangsta rap
- Length: 3:35
- Label: Bad Boy South; Block; Atlantic
- Songwriters: Alonzo Mathis; Dee Jay Dana; Chris Flame
- Producers: Chris Flame; Dee Jay Dana

Gorilla Zoe singles chronology
"Coffee Shop" (2007)	"Hood Nigga" (2007)	"Bottle Poppin'" (2007)

Music video
- "Hood Figga" on YouTube

"Hood Nigga" (edited for radio as "Hood Figga") is a song by American hip hop recording artist Gorilla Zoe, released as the lead single from his debut album, Welcome to the Zoo. It was officially released via iTunes, on April 24, 2007. The song was produced by Chris Flame and Dee Jay Dana.

== Music video ==
This music video premiered on MTV2 on June 18, 2007, and BET on June 19, 2007. DJ Drama, Block, Yung Joc, Eightball, and Trae made cameo appearances in the music video.

== Remixes ==
- The song "Get It Up" by Santigold, M.I.A., Gorilla Zoe is part remix, part mash-up, and features a large portion of the Gorilla Zoe single at the beginning of the song. It was produced by Radioclit and has brought renewed interest in the original.
- The 1st official remix, called "Hood Figga" (The Block Remix), features Young Jeezy, Big Boi, Jody Breeze, and Rick Ross (in that order), the remix was released as an explicit version.
- The 2nd official remix, called "Hood Figga" (The Block Remix), features Rick Ross, Jim Jones, Yung Joc, and Young Jeezy (in that order) and a new verse by Gorilla Zoe, the remix was released as an edited version.
- Initially, another leaked remix featured just Jeezy's verse, while yet another featured Jeezy and Big Boi's verses, as well as a verse by Trae. There is also another remix featuring Jermaine Dupri. Also, a Miami Remix featuring Rick Ross & Pitbull has made its way onto the mixtape circuit. Another remix featuring Lil Wayne and Birdman has also made its way into the song.
- Philadelphia rapper Cassidy released a remix of the instrumental featuring his Larsiny Family rap group.
- New York rapper Jae Millz released a remix of the instrumental called "Fly Nigga" on his "Zone Out Season" mixtape.
- California rapper Tyga released a remix over the instrumental of the same name of Jae Millz's instrumental (Fly Nigga) which was supposed to be in the album No Introduction and of which there is an official video available on YouTube.
- West Coast rapper Jay Rock released a remix of the instrumental called "Blood Nigga" along with a video available on YouTube.

== Chart performance ==
"Hood Nigga" debuted on the Billboard Hot 100 on the week ending August 11, 2007 at number 100. Twelve weeks later, it peaked at number 38 on the week ending November 3, 2007, and stayed on the chart for twenty weeks after leaving the chart. This is Gorilla Zoe's only top 40 hit on that chart, to date.

=== Weekly charts ===
Chart (2007)	Peak position
US Billboard Hot 100	38
US Hot R&B/Hip-Hop Songs (Billboard)	13
US Hot Rap Songs (Billboard)	7
US Rhythmic Airplay (Billboard)	19

=== Year-end charts ===
Chart (2007)	Position
US Hot R&B/Hip-Hop Songs (Billboard)	56
