= Dem Boyz (Boyz n da Hood song) =

Single by Boyz n da Hood

from the album Boyz n da Hood
- Released: 2004
- Recorded: 2004
- Genre: Gangsta rap, Southern hip hop
- Length: 4:16
- Label: Bad Boy South, Block Entertainment
- Songwriters: Lee F Dixon, Jay Jenkins, Chadron Moore, Miguel T Scott, Zachary Anson Wallace, Jacoby White
- Producer: Nitti

Music video
- "Dem Boyz" on YouTube

"Dem Boyz" is the first single from Boyz n da Hood's self-titled debut album.

The song reached number 56 on the Billboard Hot 100, number 15 on the R&B/Hip-Hop Songs chart, and number 13 on the Rap Songs chart.

== Charts ==
=== Weekly charts ===
Chart (2005)	Peak position
US Billboard Hot 100	56
US Hot R&B/Hip-Hop Songs (Billboard)	15
US Hot Rap Songs (Billboard)	13
US Pop 100 (Billboard)	63

=== Year-end charts ===
Chart (2005)	Position
US Hot R&B/Hip-Hop Songs (Billboard)	48
