= Twisted (Gorilla Zoe song) =

2011 single by Gorilla Zoe featuring Lil Jon

Single by Gorilla Zoe featuring Lil Jon

from the album King Kong
- Released: February 14, 2011
- Recorded: 2009–2011
- Genre: Hip hop
- Length: 2:57
- Label: Block; E1
- Songwriters: Alonzo Mathis Jr.; Jonathan Smith; Montay Humphrey; William Jones; Korey Roberson; James Smith III
- Producer: DJ Montay

Gorilla Zoe singles chronology
"What's Goin On" (2010)	"Twisted" (2011)	"Crazy" (2011)

Lil Jon singles chronology
"Machuka" (2010)	"Twisted" (2011)	"Turbulence" (2011)

Music video
- "Twisted" on YouTube

"Twisted" is a song by American rapper Gorilla Zoe, released on February 14, 2011, as the second single from his third studio album King Kong. It features American rapper Lil Jon and was produced by DJ Montay.

== Critical reception ==
Rose Lilah of HotNewHipHop wrote "Gorilla Zoe's odds keep getting better with each new leak, and Twisted will undoubtedly improve his chances of winning. It's a worthy addition to a respectable catalogue that has seen a lot of growth since Gorilla Zoe debuted in this game. We're looking forward to the follow-up." Reviewing King Kong for AllMusic, David Jeffries commented that Lil Jon's "spirited 'Yeah''s" help make the song a "key cut".

== Charts ==
Chart (2011)	Peak position
US Billboard Hot 100	77
US Hot R&B/Hip-Hop Songs (Billboard)	63
