= Lookin Boy =

"Lookin' Boy"

Single by Hotstylz featuring Yung Joc
- Released: May 13, 2008
- Recorded: 2007
- Genre: Hip hop, snap, comedy hip hop
- Length: 3:27
- Label: Swagg Team; Block; Jive; Zomba
- Songwriters: J. Robinson, G.D. Hodge Jr., D. Johnson, R. Jones
- Producer: Nitti

Yung Joc singles chronology
"Buy U a Drank (Shawty Snappin')" (2007)	"Lookin' Boy" (2007)	"So Fly" (2008)

"Lookin' Boy" (also known as "Lookin' Ass Nigga") is a song by American hip hop group Hotstylz, released on May 13, 2008, as their lone single. The song, which was produced by Southern hip hop producer Nitti, features vocals from fellow American rapper Yung Joc.

== Background ==
The song is a game that derives from The Dozens, but instead replaces the classic "Your Mama" opening references with quips ending with the closing reference "...lookin' boy", or "lookin' ass nigga" in the explicit version. The song was meant to be the lead single for their unreleased debut album.

== Music video ==
The music video was released in May 2008. American reality television personality Midget Mac, from I Love New York 2 makes a cameo appearance in the video.

== Controversy ==
In 2013, Detroit-based rapper Eminem sampled this song for his 2013 single "Rap God". The group claims that Eminem did not receive permission to use the sample, nor did he credit or compensate them. In November 2013, Hotstylz released a diss track towards Eminem titled "Rap Fraud", where they sample several of his songs and criticize him for not crediting them. In January 2015, TMZ reported Hotstylz were suing Eminem and Shady Records for the amount of $8 million, for using the 25 second sample of "Lookin' Boy" on his song "Rap God", without their permission. In March 2016, the lawsuit was dismissed as both parties reached a confidential settlement.

== Cultural references ==
There are numerous references to celebrities and popular icons that go in this order:

- Hilary Banks' fiancé Trevor proposing to her from The Fresh Prince of Bel-Air
- Whoopi Goldberg
- "Midnight Train to Georgia" by Gladys Knight & the Pips
- Don Imus "nappy headed ho" controversy
- K-Y Jelly
- Morris Chestnut's death scene in Boyz n the Hood
- Valtrex
- LL Cool J (his role in In the House)
- Penny getting whooped by her mother in Good Times
- J. J. from Good Times
- LL Cool J's I Need Love song
- "1st of tha Month" by Bone Thugs-n-Harmony
- "This Is Your Brain on Drugs" commercials
- Comedian Bernie Mac's role in Life
- The Weakest Link
- The Chris Stokes/Raz-B sex scandal
- Pepé Le Pew
- Mike Tyson's response about biting Evander Holyfield
- Minute Rice
- Chris Rock's comedy routine
- Cam'ron and Mase's Horse & Carriage single
- Let Me Clear My Throat by DJ Kool
- SpongeBob SquarePants
- K-Swiss
- Scooby-Doo
  - Michael Vick's dog fighting controversy
- Clifton Powell's role in Next Friday
- The fictional hair product "Soul Glo" from the movie Coming to America
- David Ruffin
- "Ain't Too Proud to Beg" by The Temptations
- Young Joc's single It's Goin' Down
- Tickle Me Elmo
- "I Wish" by Skee-Lo
- Pine-Sol
- "The Song That Never Ends" from Lamb Chop's Play-Along
- John Witherspoon's "Bang Bang Bang" catch phrase and his role in The Wayans Bros.

== Remixes ==
There are several remixes and alternate versions of "Lookin' Boy" that feature:

- Yung Joc and R. Kelly
- Yung Joc and Bow Wow
- Yung Joc and Cassidy
- Yung Joc and Prezidential Candidates

On the R. Kelly remix, there are references to:

- Betty Boop
- Shabba Ranks
- Flavor Flav's catch phrase "yeah boy"
- Tina Turner
- RuPaul
- Wilma Flintstone from The Flintstones
- Three 6 Mafia's "It's Hard out Here for a Pimp"
- Elmer Fudd

On the Cassidy freestyle, there are references to:

- Kid 'n Play
- Sheneneh Jenkins from Martin
- Beetlejuice from The Howard Stern Show
- Big Worm character from Friday
- Usher's song Burn
- Chris Rock
- Jamie Foxx's role in Jarhead
- Homey D. Clown from In Living Color
- Lil Wayne's song Lollipop
- Tyrone Biggums from Chappelle's Show
- Kris Kross' famous 1992 hit song Jump
- The famous "Life is like a box of chocolates" quote from Forrest Gump
- Bruh-Man from the 5th floor on Martin
- Chinese lady in the store from Don't Be a Menace to South Central While Drinking Your Juice in the Hood

On the Bow Wow Remix, there are references to:

- Chris Tucker in Friday
- Evander Holyfield and his many children
- James Earl Jones in Coming to America
- Beetlejuice from The Howard Stern Show
- E.T. phoning home
- Don King Only in America
- MMA Kimbo Slice
- Omarion's Song "O"
- T-Pain-Buy U a Drank
- Jaws
- Ronny Turiaf
- D'Angelo's song "Untitled(How Does it Feel)"
- Method Man
- Krayzie Bone
- Pretty Ricky
- Mr. T
- P. Diddy
- Ying Yang Twins

== Charts ==
=== Weekly charts ===
Chart (2008)	Peak position
US Billboard Hot 100	47
US Hot R&B/Hip-Hop Songs (Billboard)	11
US Hot Rap Songs (Billboard)	9
US Rhythmic Airplay (Billboard)	24

=== Year-end charts ===
Chart (2008)	Position
US Hot R&B/Hip-Hop Songs (Billboard)	66

== Release history ==
Release dates and formats for "Lookin Boy"
Region	Date	Format	Label(s)	Ref.
United States	August 5, 2008	Mainstream airplay	Jive	
