= Back Up n da Chevy =

Studio album by Boyz n da Hood
- Released: August 7, 2007
- Recorded: 2006–2007
- Genres: Southern hip hop; gangsta rap
- Length: 1:01:06
- Labels: Block; Bad Boy South; Atlantic
- Producers: P. Diddy (exec.); Russell Spencer (exec.); The Runners; Big Duke; Carl Mo; Caviar; C.P.K. Productions; Dee Jay Dana; Drumma Boy; Fangaz; Fatboi; Oz

Boyz n da Hood chronology
| Boyz n da Hood (2005) | Back Up n da Chevy (2007) |

Singles from Back Up n da Chevy
- 1. "Everybody Know Me" Released: April 10, 2007; 2. "Table Dance" Released: September 9, 2007; 3. "Paper" Released: March 7, 2008

Professional ratings
Review scores
| Source | Rating |
|---|---|
| AllMusic | 3/5 stars |
| Entertainment Weekly | B− |
| HipHopDX | 2/5 |
| RapReviews | 5/10 |
| Spin | 2/5 stars |
| XXL | 3/5 |

Back Up n da Chevy is the second and final studio album by American Southern hip hop group Boyz n da Hood. It was released on August 7, 2007, through Block Entertainment, Bad Boy South and Atlantic Records. Production was handled by Dee Jay Dana, The Runners, Big Duke, Carl Mo, Caviar, Crown Kingz Productions, Drumma Boy, Fangaz and Oz, with P. Diddy and Russell Spencer serving as executive producers. It features guest appearances from Yung Joc, Alfamega, Durty, Ice Cube, Rick Ross, T-Rok and T-Pain. The album debuted at number 51 on the Billboard 200 chart in the United States selling 15,700 units, and fell to number 100 on its second week, selling 8,300 copies.

The album's first single is "Everybody Know Me", which was released on iTunes on April 10, 2007. The second single was confirmed to be "Table Dance" featuring T-Pain, but it was never released.

== Track listing ==
| No. | Title | Writer(s) | Producer(s) | Length |
|---|---|---|---|---|
| 1. | "Everybody Know Me" | Alonzo Mathis; Jacoby White; Lee Dixon; Miguel Scott; Andrew Harr; Jermaine Jackson | Dee Jay Dana | 4:40 |
| 2. | "Bite Down" | Mathis; J. White; Dixon; Scott; Carlton Mahone, Jr. | Carl Mo | 5:11 |
| 3. | "Say What's on Your Mind" | Mathis; J. White; Dixon; Scott; Ladamon Douglas | Dee Jay Dana | 4:33 |
| 4. | "Nothing Is Promised" (featuring Yung Joc) | Mathis; J. White; Dixon; Scott; Jasiel Robinson; Harve Pierre; Dana Ramey | Dee Jay Dana | 5:18 |
| 5. | "We Ready" (featuring Yung Joc) | Mathis; J. White; Dixon; Scott; Robinson; Nico Solis; Howard White; Mike Davis | C.K.P. (Crown Kingz Productions) | 4:19 |
| 6. | "Choppa's" (featuring Ice Cube) | Mathis; J. White; Dixon; Scott; O'Shea Jackson; Christopher Whitacre; Justin Henderson | Dee Jay Dana | 3:57 |
| 7. | "Block Boyz" (featuring T-Rok, Alfa Mega, Yung Joc and Durty) | Mathis; J. White; Dixon; Scott; Tenarius Richardson; Cedric Zellars; Robinson; Ernest Gibbs; Todd Moore | Dee Jay Dana | 4:24 |
| 8. | "We Ridin" | Mathis; J. White; Dixon; Scott; Erik Ortiz; Kevin Crowe | Dee Jay Dana | 5:14 |
| 9. | "Paper" (featuring Rick Ross) | Mathis; J. White; Dixon; Scott; William Roberts; Christopher Gholson | Drumma Boy | 3:41 |
| 10. | "Back Up N Da Chevy" | Mathis; J. White; Dixon; Scott; Douglas | Big Duke; Fangaz | 5:23 |
| 11. | "Table Dance" (featuring T-Pain) | Mathis; J. White; Dixon; Scott; Faheem Najm; Ortiz; Crowe | Dee Jay Dana | 4:45 |
| 12. | "We Thuggin'" | Mathis; J. White; Dixon; Scott; Kannon Cross | Caviar; Oz | 4:51 |
| 13. | "No Haters Allowed" | Mathis; J. White; Dixon; Scott; C. Moore | Dee Jay Dana | 4:50 |
| Total length: | | | | 1:01:06 |

== Personnel ==
- Alonzo "Gorilla Zoe" Mathis – main artist
- Jacoby "Jody Breeze" White – main artist
- Lee "Big Duke" Dixon – main artist, producer (track 10)
- Miguel "Big Gee" Scott – main artist
- Jasiel "Yung Joc" Robinson – featured artist (tracks: 4, 5, 7)
- O'Shea "Ice Cube" Jackson – featured artist (track 6)
- Tenarius "T-Rok" Richardson – featured artist (track 7)
- Cedric "AlfaMega" Zellars – featured artist (track 7)
- Ernest "Durty" Gibbs – featured artist (track 7)
- William "Rick Ross" Roberts – featured artist (track 9)
- Faheem "T-Pain" Najm – featured artist (track 11)
- "Dee Jay Dana" Ramey – producer (tracks: 1, 3, 4, 6–8, 11, 13), recording (tracks: 1–4, 6–11, 13), mixing (tracks: 1, 3, 4, 8, 11), mixing assistant (tracks: 5, 7, 10)
- Carlton "Carl Mo" Mahone Jr. – producer (track 2)
- Nico Solis – producer & recording (track 5), mixing (track 6)
- Howard White – producer (track 5)
- Mike Davis – producer (track 5)
- Christopher "Drumma Boy" Gholson – producer (track 9)
- Mike "Fangaz" Simmon – producer (track 10)
- Kannon "Caviar" Cross – producer (track 12)
- Corey "Oz" Simon – producer (track 12)
- Russell "Block" Spencer – executive producer
- Sean "P. Diddy" Combs – executive producer
- Harve "Joe Hooker" Pierre – co-executive producer
- Conrad "Rad" Dimanche – associate executive producer
- Thomas "Tom Cat" Bennett Jr. – recording (tracks: 1–4, 6–11, 13), mixing (tracks: 5, 7, 10), mixing assistant (tracks: 1, 3, 4, 8, 11)
- Carlos "Los" Brown – recording (track 1)
- Alexis Seton – recording (track 2)
- John Frye – mixing (track 2)
- Leslie Brathwaite – mixing (track 9)
- Kori Anders – mixing assistant (track 9)
- Lester Purnell – recording (track 11)
- Brent Spann – recording (track 12)
- Joe Warlick – mixing (track 12)
- Chris Athens – mastering
- Patrick Fong – design
- Peter Graham – photography
- Elexia Cook – A&R
- Kerry Carter – A&R
- Rico Brooks – management

== Charts ==
| Chart (2007) | Peak position |
|---|---|
| US Billboard 200 | 51 |
| US Top R&B/Hip-Hop Albums (Billboard) | 10 |
