= Boyz n da Hood (disambiguation) =

Boyz n da Hood was an American hip hop group.

Boyz n da Hood or Boyz n the Hood may also refer to:

- Boyz n da Hood (album), a 2005 self-titled release by the group
- Boyz n the Hood, a 1991 coming of age film directed by John Singleton
  - Boyz n the Hood (soundtrack), soundtrack to the 1991 film
- "The Boyz-n-the Hood", a 1987 song by Eazy E
