= Coffee Shop (Yung Joc song) =

Single by Yung Joc featuring Gorilla Zoe

from the album Hustlenomics
- Released: May 8, 2007
- Recorded: 2006
- Genre: Hip hop, bubblegum rap
- Length: 4:08 (Album Version); 4:02 (Clean Edit)
- Label: Bad Boy South; Block; Atlantic
- Songwriters: Alonzo Mathis, Terius Nash, Darnell Richard, Jasiel Robinson, Hosea Williams
- Producer: Don Vito

Yung Joc singles chronology
"Buy U a Drank (Shawty Snappin')" (2007)	"Coffee Shop" (2007)	"Bottle Poppin'" (2007)

Gorilla Zoe singles chronology
"Coffee Shop" (2007)	"Hood Nigga" (2007)

Music video
- "Coffee Shop" on YouTube

"Coffee Shop" is the first single from Yung Joc's second album Hustlenomics. It was officially released on May 5, 2007, but had been leaked onto the Internet beforehand. The track features Gorilla Zoe and uncredited chorus vocals by The-Dream. Joc and T-Pain performed the song at the season finale of Making the Band.

== Critical reception ==
"Coffee Shop" was met with mixed reviews from music critics. AllMusic's David Jeffries praised Joc's more laid-back delivery of his established catchy hooks and swagger, calling it "a playful number that combines hard thugging and coffee culture in ways never thought possible." DJ Z, writing for DJBooth, was wary of the song's drug-related metaphor but said that "Hidden messages aside, this joint is ultra-catchy and should spark an ultra-creative music video. More cream please!" Fellow DJBooth editor Nathan Slavik found the track's family-friendly demeanor, kids chorus and bouncing beat to be "infuriating." Steve 'Flash' Juon of RapReviews said that despite being a catchy single and acting as a launching pad for featured guest Gorilla Zoe, it does nothing new with the established hip-hop formula, saying that "[T]he cheesy sing-song Joc flow, unsurprising and formulaic lyrical subject matter and overly cute "Chain Hang Low" style children just SCREAM terrible song." Andres Tardio of HipHopDX called the song "one of the worst things to hit radio since mp3’s," criticizing the guest verse and beat for sounding like a Hip Hop Harry track. Josh Timmermann of PopMatters gave feint praise to "Coffee Shop", calling it "another forced/extended metaphor hip-pop track" that showed Joc's flaws as a rapper, but said that it was the best song off the album with its bouncy production and sing-along chorus, preferring it over 50 Cent's "Amusement Park" but not to "Candy Shop".

== Chart performance ==
The single reached number 78 on the Billboard Hot 100 and number 39 on Hot R&B/Hip Hop songs.

=== Charts ===
Chart (2007)	Peak Position
US Billboard Hot 100	78
US Hot R&B/Hip-Hop Songs (Billboard)	39
US Pop 100 (Billboard)	96

== Music video ==
The video premiered on BET's Access Granted on June 20, 2007.

In the video, Yung Joc plays four different roles; as himself, as a fat man who works at the shop, a dwarf who works at the shop, and as a bald old man who also works at the shop. Gorilla Zoe's verse in the video is not the same as his verse in the single, and the video ends after Joc says, "Hey kids, please don't do drugs." rather than continuing into "Give them to me and I'll get rid of them at the Coffee Shop" as it does in the single. The video uses the Clean Edit rather than the Album Version.

Jody Breeze, Trae, Lloyd, Rick Ross, DJ Drama, Lil Duval and 8Ball & MJG all make cameo appearances in the video.

== Formats and track listing ==
Europe CD

1. "Coffee Shop" (Explicit Album Version) – 4:04
2. "Hold Up (Explicit Version)" (featuring Durt Boy) – 3:40

US 12"

1. "Coffee Shop" (Radio Version) – 4:01
2. "Coffee Shop" (Album Version) – 4:01
3. "Coffee Shop" (Instrumental) – 4:02
4. "Coffee Shop" (Radio Version) – 4:01
5. "Coffee Shop" (Album Version) – 4:01
6. "Coffee Shop" (Instrumental) – 4:02

== Cover Versions ==
In 2007 the supergroup Psychopathic Rydas did a cover of the song which was on their album Duk Da Fuk Down that was released at the Gathering of the Juggalos on August 8, 2007.
