= New Joc City =

Studio album by Yung Joc
- Released: June 6, 2006
- Recorded: 2004–06
- Genre: Southern hip hop
- Length: 54:48
- Labels: Bad Boy South; Block; Atlantic
- Producers: Diddy (exec.); Nitti; Deezle; DJ Dana; Blac Elvis; Milwaukee Black; Los Vegas; Chris Flame; Chino Dolla; DJ Dana

Yung Joc chronology
New Joc City (2006)	Hustlenomics (2007)

Singles from New Joc City
- 1. "It's Goin' Down" Released: April 15, 2006; 2. "I Know You See It" Released: July 15, 2006; 3. "1st Time" Released: November 2006

New Joc City is the debut studio album by American rapper Yung Joc. It was released on June 6, 2006, by Bad Boy South, Block Entertainment, and Atlantic Records. Upon its release, the album features two hit songs such as "It's Goin' Down" and "I Know You See It" with the former of two reaching at number three on the US Billboard Hot 100.

== Commercial performance ==
New Joc City was released on June 6, 2006, by Bad Boy South, Block Entertainment, and Atlantic Records. Upon its release, the album debuted at number 3 on the US Billboard 200, with 150,000 copies sold in the first week. In its second week, the album dropped to number 9, with 70,000 copies sold. As of August 11, 2006, the album became a certified gold by the Recording Industry Association of America (RIAA), selling 500,000 copies in the United States.

== Reception ==
Professional ratings
Review scores
Source	Rating
Allmusic	3/5 stars
Atlanta Journal-Constitution	C+
HipHopDX	2/5 stars
Pitchfork	(3.2/10)
RapReviews	(6.5/10)
XXL	3/5 stars

Reviews for this album were mixed. Rating the album "L" (in its five-level clothing size rating system from "S" to "XXL"), XXL praised "Dope Boy Magic" as having "endless head-turning punch lines...with different sequential number combinations" but panned other tracks as "go[ing] in cliché circles" with "[c]orny brand-name drops." In a three-star (out of five) review, David Jeffries of AllMusic described the album as having an "identity crisis" due to tracks that he found "less convincing" than the "safe and tested surroundings" of "It's Goin' Down" and "I Know You See It." The Atlanta Journal-Constitution, based in Yung Joc's hometown, graded the album "C+", calling lead single "It's Goin' Down" "simple...[but] infectious" while finding a lack of "a new, exciting reserve of wordplay and delivery." RapReviews found other tracks such as "Don't Play Wit It" to be better choices as a lead single.

For HipHopDX, Brian Sims rated New Joc City two out of five ("aluminum") due to what he called "reused lines" and a "dull mood plaguing most of the album." About "It's Goin' Down", Sims called the song "monotonous". Tom Breihan of Pitchfork rated the album 3.2 out of 10 points, criticizing the album as having "no visible identity or purpose" and "bargain-basement minimal snap stuff."

== Track listing ==
No.	Title	Producer(s)	Length
1.	"New Joc City (Intro)"	Dana "Dee Jay Dana" Ramey	2:15
2.	"It's Goin' Down" (featuring Nitti)	Nitti	4:01
3.	"He Stayed in Trouble (Interlude)" (featuring A.D. "Griff" Griffin)		0:56
4.	"Do Ya Bad"	Crown Kingz Productions (C.K.P.); N.U. Music Productions	4:10
5.	"Don't Play Wit It" (featuring Big Gee)	Deezle	4:01
6.	"Excuse Me Officer (Interlude)" (featuring A.D. "Griff" Griffin)		0:38
7.	"Dope Boy Magic" (featuring Nicolas "Play Boy Nick" Smith, Corey "BlackOwned C-Bone" Andrews, and Chauncey "Chino Dolla" Stevens)	Chauncey "Chino Dolla" Stevens	4:32
8.	"Patron"	Dwain "Kochease" Warren	4:43
9.	"Flip Flop" (featuring Boyz n da Hood, Nino Storm, and Cheri Dennis)	Dana "Dee Jay Dana" Ramey	4:36
10.	"I'm Him"	Chris "Chris Flame" Ussery; Chauncey "Chino Dolla" Stevens	3:42
11.	"Hear Me Coming"	Benny "Dada" Tillman; Carlos "Los Vegas" Thornton	3:57
12.	"I Know You See It" (featuring Brandy "Ms. B" Hambrick)	Yung Joc; Dwain "Kochease" Warren	4:01
13.	"Yung Nigga (Interlude)" (featuring A.D. "Griff" Griffin)		0:15
14.	"1st Time" (featuring Marques Houston and Trey Songz)	Benny "Dada" Tillman; Carlos "Los Vegas" Thornton	4:27
15.	"Knock It Out"	Darren "Milwaukee Black" Jordan	4:25
16.	"Picture Perfect"	Elvis "Blac Elvis" Williams	4:09

== Charts ==
=== Weekly charts ===
Chart (2006)	Peak position
US Billboard 200	3
US Top R&B/Hip-Hop Albums (Billboard)	1
US Top Rap Albums (Billboard)	1

=== Year-end charts ===
Chart (2006)	Position
US Billboard 200	66
US Top R&B/Hip-Hop Albums (Billboard)	15

== Certifications ==
Region	Certification	Certified units/sales
United States (RIAA)	Gold	500,000^{^}
^{^} Shipments figures based on certification alone.
