= Boyz n da Hood (album) =

Studio album by Boyz n da Hood
- Released: June 21, 2005
- Recorded: 2004–2005
- Studios: Sho'Nuff Studios (Atlanta, GA); PatchWerk Recording Studios (Atlanta, GA); The Zone (Atlanta, GA); Circle House Studios (Miami, FL); 730 Beat Street (Atlanta, GA); Futuristic Recording Studios (Atlanta, GA); D.A.R.P. Studios (Atlanta, GA)
- Genres: Southern hip hop; gangsta rap
- Length: 1:08:04
- Labels: Block; Bad Boy South; Atlantic
- Producers: P. Diddy (exec.); Russell Spencer (exec.); C.P.K. Productions; DJ Toomp; Drumma Boy; Erick Sermon; Horace "Bubba" Mitchell; Jasper Cameron; Jazze Pha; Keith Mack; Midnight Black; Nitti; Sanchez Holmes; Swizzo

Boyz n da Hood chronology
Boyz n da Hood (2005)	Back Up n da Chevy (2007)

Singles from Boyz n da Hood
- 1. "Dem Boyz" Released: 2004

Professional ratings
Review scores
Source	Rating
AllMusic	3/5 stars
Entertainment Weekly	C−
HipHopDX	2.5/5
RapReviews	5/10
Spin	B+

Boyz n da Hood is the debut studio album by American Southern hip hop group Boyz n da Hood. It was released on June 21, 2005, through Block Entertainment, Bad Boy South and Atlantic Records. Recording sessions took place at Sho'Nuff Studios, PatchWerk Recording Studios, The Zone, 730 Beat Street, Futuristic Recording Studios and D.A.R.P. Studios in Atlanta and at Circle House Studios in Miami. Production was handled by Jazze Pha, Nitti, Drumma Boy, Crown Kingz Productions, DJ Toomp, Erick Sermon, Horace "Bubba" Mitchell, Jasper Cameron, Keith Mack, Midnight Black, Sanchez Holmes and Swizzo, with P. Diddy and Russell Spencer serving as executive producers. It features guest appearances from Eazy-E, Jazze Pha, Puff Daddy, Rick Ross and Young Malice. The album peaked at number 5 on the Billboard 200 and number-one on both the Top R&B/Hip-Hop Albums and Top Rap Albums charts in the United States. Its lead single, "Dem Boyz", reached number No. 13 on the Hot Rap Songs chart.

== Track listing ==
No.	Title	Writer(s)	Producer(s)	Length
1.	"Album Intro" (featuring Puff Daddy)	Jay Jenkins; Jacoby White; Lee Dixon; Miguel Scott; Randy Banks	Swizzo	1:41
2.	"Boyz N da Hood" (Interlude)	Jenkins; J. White; Dixon; Scott; Michael Davis	C.K.P. (Crown Kingz Productions)	2:22
3.	"Dem Boyz"	Jenkins; J. White; Dixon; Scott; Chadron Moore; Zachary Wallace	Nitti	4:16
4.	"Felonies"	Jenkins; J. White; Dixon; Scott; Phalon Alexander; Wallace	Jazze Pha	4:59
5.	"Look"	Jenkins; J. White; Dixon; Scott; Christopher Gholson	Drumma Boy	4:56
6.	"Gangstas" (featuring Eazy-E)	Jenkins; J. White; Dixon; Scott; Eric Wright; Alexander	Erick Sermon	3:49
7.	"Don't Put Your Hands on Me"	Jenkins; J. White; Dixon; Scott; Aldrin Davis; Mark Morales; Darren Robinson; Damon Wimbley; Lawrence Smith; Kurtis Walker; David Reeves; Salvatore Abbatiello	DJ Toomp	4:33
8.	"Bitches & Bizness" (featuring Rick Ross)	Jenkins; J. White; Dixon; Scott; William Roberts; Moore	Nitti	4:18
9.	"Trap Niggaz"	Jenkins; J. White; Dixon; Scott; Gholson	Drumma Boy	3:47
10.	"Still Slizzard"	Jenkins; J. White; Dixon; Scott; Moore	Nitti	5:07
11.	"No Talkin'"	Jenkins; J. White; Dixon; Scott; Sanchez Holmes	Sanchez "RockHead" Holmes	5:25
12.	"Happy Jamz" (featuring Jazze Pha and Young Malice)	Jenkins; J. White; Dixon; Scott; Alexander; B. Jordan	Jazze Pha	4:48
13.	"If U a Thug"	Jenkins; J. White; Dixon; Scott; Keith McMasters	Keith Mack	5:09
14.	"Lay It Down"	Jenkins; J. White; Dixon; Scott; Jasper Cameron	Jasper	4:17
15.	"Pussy M.F.'s" (featuring Trick Daddy)	Jenkins; J. White; Dixon; Scott; M. Young; Alexander	Jazze Pha; Horace "Bubba" Mitchell	4:24
16.	"Keep It n' da Hood 2Nite" (featuring Tocarra Hamilton)	Jenkins; J. White; Dixon; Scott; Tracey Sewell	Midnight Black	3:23
Total length:				1:08:04

== Charts ==
=== Weekly charts ===
Chart (2005)	Peak position
US Billboard 200	5
US Top R&B/Hip-Hop Albums (Billboard)	1
US Top Rap Albums (Billboard)	1

=== Year-end charts ===
Chart (2005)	Position
US Top R&B/Hip-Hop Albums (Billboard)	51

== See also ==
- List of Billboard number-one R&B albums of 2005
- List of number-one rap albums of 2005 (U.S.)
