= Hustlenomics =

Studio album by Yung Joc
- Released: August 28, 2007
- Recorded: 2006–07
- Genre: Southern hip hop; hardcore hip hop; gangsta rap
- Length: 60:00
- Label: Bad Boy South; Block; Atlantic
- Producer: Diddy (exec.); Chris Flames; Cool & Dre; Dee Jay Dana; Don P.; Don Vito; Drumma Boy; G-Phonics; Jazze Pha; Jon Josef; Khao; Strong Hill; The Fixxers; The Neptunes

Yung Joc chronology
New Joc City (2006)	Hustlenomics (2007)	The Grind Flu (2009)

Singles from Hustlenomics
- 1. "Coffee Shop" Released: May 8, 2007

Hustlenomics (stylized as HUSTLENOMIC$) is the second studio album by American rapper Yung Joc. It was released by Bad Boy South, Block Entertainment, and Atlantic Records on August 28, 2007. The album contains the singles "Coffee Shop" and "Bottle Poppin," both featuring rapper Gorilla Zoe.

== History ==
The first single from the album is "Coffee Shop" which features Gorilla Zoe.

The second single off the album, "Bottle Poppin", was leaked to the internet in May. Like the first single, the track featured Gorilla Zoe. It was produced by Don P of Trillville. It also featured the song "Chevy Smile", which Yung Joc said would be the number one song of the year. The song samples Gorilla Zoe's "Hood Figga". The single reached number three on the U.S. Billboard Bubbling Under Hot 100 Singles chart, and number 59 and 25 on the Hot R&B/Hip-Hop Songs and Hot Rap Tracks charts, respectively. The music video for "Bottle Poppin'" has been released and Gettin' To Da Money also has a music video.

The third single "I'm a G" features Young Dro & Bun B, there was also a video made for the single.

The album features production from Diddy, who executive produced the album, Cool and Dre, Don Vito, Drumma Boy, Jazze Pha, the Fixxers, the Neptunes, among others.

Guests include Bun B, Diddy, Gorilla Zoe, Jim Jones, Rick Ross, Snoop Dogg, the Game, Trick Daddy, Young Dro and more.

== Reception ==
=== Critical reception ===
Professional ratings
Review scores
Source	Rating
AllMusic	3.5/5 stars
DJBooth	3/5 stars
Entertainment Weekly	A−
HipHopDX	2/5 stars
PopMatters	5/10
RapReviews	6/10
Rolling Stone	2/5 stars
Stylus Magazine	D+

Simon Vozick-Levinson of Entertainment Weekly said, "With his sophomore effort, the rhymester confidently wraps his unhurried drawl around the hugest, most sparkling synths that exec producer P. Diddy’s riches can buy. Yung though he is, Joc just may be a credible rival to T.I. as the reigning king of ATL swagger". AllMusic editor David Jeffries called it a "big improvement" over New Joc City, praising the T.I.-less looser vibe throughout the album's track listing, calling Hustlenomics "a step in the right direction for Joc, but more importantly to the listener, it's always entertaining and quite impressive in parts."

DJBooth's Nathan Slavik gave praise to tracks like "Hell Yeah" and "Brand New" for having the kind of "feel good vibes" that work best for Joc than being on either side of "straight hardcore" ("Cut Throat") or "family-friendly" ("Coffee Shop"). He later called Hustlenomics "a decent album that tries so hard to please everyone it loses its own identity. If Joc and Bad Boy are hustlers selling hip-hop, what does that make anyone who buys his album? I'm not hating, I just can’t shake the feeling I'm being hustled." PopMatters contributor Josh Timmermann felt that Joc was a "marginally talented, deeply generic rapper" throughout the record and gave credit to the various producers and featured artists for elevating the material, saying "[I]f this album proves nothing else, it’s that the formula still works: hire A-list producers and guest rappers, and you're all but guaranteed a passable hip-hop record."

Despite commending the production overall, Andres Tardio of HipHopDX said, "On an album full of bewildering lines, no special dances and no real draw in general, Joc is left without much to dance on. Even if he does "walk it out the bank," we are still grading a rap album and Hustlenomics is a class that should be missed." Rolling Stone's Christian Hoard was critical of the album, saying that Joc's "slack diction, mild drawl and unremarkable rhymes about drug-slinging and his own greatness" resembled that of a poor interpretation of the Game, concluding that it's "less a treatise than a collection of lame get-rich anthems. It will probably earn Joc another gold chain or six, but it feels pretty generic."

=== Commercial performance ===
Hustlenomics sold 70,000 copies in its first week of release, debuting at number three on the Billboard 200. As of April 2009, it has sold approximately 200,000 copies according to Nielsen Soundscan.

== Track listing ==
#	Title	Producer(s)	Featured guest(s)	Length
1	"Hustlenomics (Intro)"	Dee Jay Dana		2:46
2	"Play Your Cards"	Cool & Dre		3:55
3	"Coffee Shop"	Don Vito	Gorilla Zoe	4:08
4	"Bottle Poppin'"	Don P	Gorilla Zoe	5:00
5	"Hell Yeah"	The Neptunes	Diddy	4:30
6	"Cut Throat"	DJ Quik	The Game; Jim Jones; Block	5:25
7	"Hustlemania (Skit)"	Dee Jay Dana		2:45
8	"I'm a G"	Chris Flames	Young Dro; Bun B	4:32
9	"BYOB"	The Neptunes		3:14
10	"Pak Man"	Chase N. Cashe		4:16
11	"Gettin' to da Money"	Jon Josef	Mike Carlito; Gorilla Zoe	3:14
12	"Brand New"	Dee Jay Dana	Snoop Dogg; Rick Ross	5:45
13	"Livin' the Life"	Drumma Boy	Southern Girl	4:20
14	"Momma"	Jazze Pha	Jazze Pha	3:53
15	"Chevy Smile"	Jazze Pha	Trick Daddy; Block; Jazze Pha	4:28
16	"Hustlenomics"	Strong Hill		3:06
17	"Hold Up" (Best Buy bonus track)	Dee Jay Dana	Durt Boy	3:33
18	"Do It" (Best Buy bonus track)	Dee Jay Dana	Durt Boy	2:54

== Charts ==
=== Weekly charts ===
Chart (2007)	Peak position
US Billboard 200	3
US Top R&B/Hip-Hop Albums (Billboard)	1
US Top Rap Albums (Billboard)	1

=== Year-end charts ===
Chart (2007)	Position
US Top R&B/Hip-Hop Albums (Billboard)	86
