= List of Billboard number-one R&B/hip-hop albums of 2005 =

This page lists the albums that reached number one on the Billboard Top R&B/Hip-Hop Albums and Top Rap Albums charts in 2005. The Rap Albums chart partially serves as a distillation of rap-specific titles from the overall R&B/Hip-Hop Albums chart.

== Chart history ==
Key
†	Indicates best-performing album of 2005

Issue date	R&B/Hip-Hop Albums	Artist(s)	Rap Albums	Artist(s)	Refs.
January 1	Loyal to the Game	2Pac	Loyal to the Game	2Pac	
January 8	Destiny Fulfilled	Destiny's Child	Encore	Eminem	
January 15	Get Lifted	John Legend	Crunk Juice	Lil Jon and the Eastside Boyz	
January 22	Get Lifted	John Legend	Crunk Juice	Lil Jon and the Eastside Boyz	
January 29	Get Lifted	John Legend	Crunk Juice	Lil Jon and the Eastside Boyz	
February 5	The Documentary	The Game	The Documentary	The Game	
February 12	The Documentary	The Game	The Documentary	The Game	
February 19	The Documentary	The Game	The Documentary	The Game	
February 26	The Documentary	The Game	The Documentary	The Game	
March 5	The Documentary	The Game	The Documentary	The Game	
March 12	O	Omarion	The Documentary	The Game	
March 19	The Massacre †	50 Cent	The Massacre †	50 Cent	
March 26	The Massacre †	50 Cent	The Massacre †	50 Cent	
April 2	The Massacre †	50 Cent	The Massacre †	50 Cent	
April 9	The Massacre †	50 Cent	The Massacre †	50 Cent	
April 16	The B. Coming	Beanie Sigel	The B. Coming	Beanie Sigel	
April 23	The First Lady	Faith Evans	The Massacre †	50 Cent	
April 30	The Emancipation of Mimi	Mariah Carey	The Massacre †	50 Cent	
May 7	Who Is Mike Jones?	Mike Jones	Who Is Mike Jones?	Mike Jones	
May 14	Disturbing tha Peace Presents Bobby Valentino	Bobby Valentino	Who Is Mike Jones?	Mike Jones	
May 21	The Emancipation of Mimi	Mariah Carey	Who Is Mike Jones?	Mike Jones	
May 28	The Emancipation of Mimi	Mariah Carey	Who Is Mike Jones?	Mike Jones	
June 4	Album II	Kem	534	Memphis Bleek	
June 11	Be	Common	Be	Common	
June 18	The Emancipation of Mimi	Mariah Carey	Be	Common	
June 25	Monkey Business	The Black Eyed Peas	Monkey Business	The Black Eyed Peas	
July 2	The Emancipation of Mimi	Mariah Carey	All or Nothing	Fat Joe	
July 9	Boyz n da Hood	Boyz n da Hood	Boyz n da Hood	Boyz n da Hood	
July 16	U.S.A. (United State of Atlanta)	Ying Yang Twins	U.S.A. (United State of Atlanta)	Ying Yang Twins	
July 23	TP.3 Reloaded	R. Kelly	The Cookbook	Missy Elliott	
July 30	TP.3 Reloaded	R. Kelly	Already Platinum	Slim Thug	
August 6	Now! 19	Now! series / Various artists	Wanted	Bow Wow	
August 13	Let's Get It: Thug Motivation 101	Young Jeezy	Let's Get It: Thug Motivation 101	Young Jeezy	
August 20	Let's Get It: Thug Motivation 101	Young Jeezy	Let's Get It: Thug Motivation 101	Young Jeezy	
August 27	Let's Get It: Thug Motivation 101	Young Jeezy	Let's Get It: Thug Motivation 101	Young Jeezy	
September 3	Let's Get It: Thug Motivation 101	Young Jeezy	Let's Get It: Thug Motivation 101	Young Jeezy	
September 10	Harlem: Diary of a Summer	Jim Jones	Harlem: Diary of a Summer	Jim Jones	
September 17	Late Registration	Kanye West	Late Registration	Kanye West	
September 24	Late Registration	Kanye West	Late Registration	Kanye West	
October 1	The Peoples Champ	Paul Wall	The Peoples Champ	Paul Wall	
October 8	So Amazing: An All-Star Tribute to Luther Vandross	Various artists	Late Registration	Kanye West	
October 15	Most Known Unknown	Three 6 Mafia	Most Known Unknown	Three 6 Mafia	
October 22	The Day After	Twista	The Day After	Twista	
October 29	Unplugged	Alicia Keys	The Day After	Twista	
November 5	Trill	Bun B	Trill	Bun B	
November 12	#1's	Destiny's Child	Trill	Bun B	
November 19	Trill	Bun B	Trill	Bun B	
November 26	Get Rich or Die Tryin'	Soundtrack / G-Unit	Get Rich or Die Tryin'	Soundtrack	
December 3	Get Rich or Die Tryin'	Soundtrack / G-Unit	Get Rich or Die Tryin'	Soundtrack	
December 10	What the Game's Been Missing!	Juelz Santana	What the Game's Been Missing!	Juelz Santana	
December 17	Chris Brown	Chris Brown	What the Game's Been Missing!	Juelz Santana	
December 24	Tha Carter II	Lil Wayne	Tha Carter II	Lil Wayne	
December 31	Ludacris Presents Disturbing tha Peace	Disturbing tha Peace / Various artists	Ludacris Presents Disturbing tha Peace	Various artists	

== See also ==
- 2005 in music
- 2005 in hip hop music
- List of number-one R&B singles of 2005 (U.S.)
- List of Billboard 200 number-one albums of 2005
