= Kamaal the Abstract =

Studio album by Q-Tip
- Released: September 15, 2009
- Recorded: 2001
- Genres: Neo soul; jazz fusion; funk; hip hop
- Length: 41:03
- Labels: Battery; Jive
- Producer: Q-Tip

Q-Tip chronology
The Renaissance (2008)	Kamaal the Abstract (2009)

Original cover
- Artwork of shelved issue

Singles from Kamaal the Abstract
- 1. "Barely in Love" Released: September 1, 2009

Kamaal the Abstract is the third studio album by American hip-hop artist Q-Tip, released on September 15, 2009, through Battery Records and Jive Records. Recorded in 2001, the album is a departure from his solo debut album Amplified (1999). Kamaal the Abstract is an eclectic album that features Q-Tip rapping, singing, and exploring his jazz influences. The album contains introspective and life-related lyrical themes.

The album was originally planned for release in 2002 as the follow-up to Amplified. However, it was shelved by Q-Tip's record label at the time, Arista, which doubted its commercial potential. It eventually leaked onto the internet, while the distribution of promotional copies led several publications to run reviews of the album.

After its official release in 2009, the album debuted at number 77 on the U.S. Billboard 200 chart, selling 6,000 copies in its first week. Upon its release, Kamaal the Abstract received positive reviews from most music critics.

== Music ==
An eclectic album, Kamaal the Abstract serves as a departure from Q-Tip's debut album Amplified (1999), which is more mainstream-oriented in its style and production approach. The album has Q-Tip rapping, singing, and exploring his jazz influences. While it contains elements of hip hop, pop, and rock music, the album's improvisational sound is generally rooted in jazz and funk. The album's songs mostly feature loose arrangements that provide space for improvisation. Its instrumentation is characterized by electric piano, flute playing, deep organs, guitar-fuelled grooves, and improvised solos. On its musical style, music critic John Bush wrote that Kamaal the Abstract "pays homage to the last gasp of organically produced mainstream pop in the '70s and '80s, paying a large compliment to Prince and Stevie Wonder".

The album has been compared by writers to soul and funk-oriented albums such as D'Angelo's Voodoo (2000), André 3000's The Love Below (2003), and Prince's Musicology (2004), as well as the hip hop/neo soul work of the Soulquarians collective. In his book To the Break of Dawn: A Freestyle on the Hip Hop Aesthetic (2007), music writer William Jelani Cobb cited Kamaal the Abstract, along with The Roots' Phrenology (2002), Mos Def's Black on Both Sides (1999), Common's Electric Circus (2002), and the work of Jill Scott and Erykah Badu, as a "genre-bending" effort at musical expansion of hip hop.

=== Lyrics ===
The 'profilin cop' who stops [Q-Tip] on his way there is just another mundane and too-predictable distraction in a world full of them. Kamaal is an album about sidestepping the cop and avoiding pettiness; the man is determined to overcome, any way he can. If that means letting the music speak for itself, then Tip doesn't rap.

— Brendan Mahoney, Tiny Mix Tapes

Kamaal the Abstract contains introspective lyrical themes. Opening with the album's only rock chord, the opening track "Feelin' It" is one of the album's few tracks with him rapping and it contains one verse about common life experiences and hassles. It introduces Q-Tip on his way to a recording studio, during which he is stopped by a police officer who profiles him: "This profiling cop with his profiling ass / Figured the best thing he could do was find a cat to harass. / The little kitten was me, not that one in the tree / The black one with the promise and the wish to be free". The lyrics are based on an experience that Q-Tip had with a policeman. John Murph of Jazz Times interpreted the song's verse as a metaphor for Q-Tip's struggles for absolute creative freedom without resulting in critical backlash. Tiny Mix Tapes's Brendan Mahoney interpreted the "profilin' cop" in the song as "another mundane and too-predictable distraction in a world full of them".

Songs such as "Blue Girl" and "Heels" demonstrate Q-Tip's female-identified perspective on Kamaal the Abstract. "Do U Dig U?" has philosophically minded lyrics that deal with existential detachment. "Barely in Love" concerns the powerful nature of love with lyrics about two lovers that are together based on physical attraction. The album's closing track, "Even If It Is So", is an ode to single parenting and discusses a hard-working mother.

== Release and promotion ==
Q-Tip began recording for the album after being signed to Arista Records by record executive Clive Davis. However, he was left to lobby the progressive project to Arista's new administration, led by L.A. Reid, after Davis left the label. Originally scheduled for an October 23, 2001, release date, and later pushed back to April 23, 2002, the album was shelved by Arista, doubting its commercial potential. It was originally set to be released with the title Abstractions, which served as the title for the album's promo LP (2001). Q-Tip later said in an interview for The Village Voice:

Well, I was on Arista, and I was there with Clive Davis. They were about to kick him out of Arista, and he called me and was like, 'Q-Tip, you need to come to J Records. I have an artist by the name of Alicia Keys, and you and her would just be great'. And I really wanted to go there because I thought Clive was a visionary; he definitely is. I was telling him about the band I wanted to do and stuff like that. And then Lyor Cohen, who runs Atlantic, used to be with Def Jam, used to manage us, and he called me and said, 'Q-Tip, you're crazy if you fuck wit' Clive. You need to fuck wit' LA [Reid]'. So me listening to some stuff that I thought was sage advice, I did that, stuck with LA. I did an album, Kamaal the Abstract, and he dug it. It went out to press. People were really liking it. It was, at the time, some other shit, and I guess he just got cold feet.

Q-Tip was upset over the album's shelving and felt that although Reid did not know how to market it, his label released OutKast's Speakerboxxx/The Love Below in 2003: "[T]hose are the kinds of sounds that are on Kamaal the Abstract. Maybe even a little more out [than OutKast]. Kamaal was just me, guerrilla". While it did not receive an official release, advanced promotional copies made their way into the public, leaking to the Internet.

In 2006, Q-Tip announced that he was in negotiations to regain control of the album from Arista/BMG and planned on officially releasing it in 2007. On July 1, 2009, Jive Records announced that it would release the album through its Battery imprint. The U.S. compact disc release was issued with the bonus track "Make It Work", and the double LP release was that song and "Damn You're Cool". "Barely in Love" was released on September 1, 2009, as the album's first single. Kamaal the Abstract subsequently debuted at number 77 on the U.S. Billboard 200 chart, selling 6,000 copies in its first week. It also peaked at number 32 on the Top R&B/Hip-Hop Albums, at number 12 on the Independent Albums, and at number 17 on the Top Rap Albums chart.

== Critical reception ==
Professional ratings
Aggregate scores
Source	Rating
Metacritic	78/100
Review scores
Source	Rating
AllMusic	4.5/5 stars
The A.V. Club	B
Blender	4/5 stars
Entertainment Weekly	B
MSN Music (Consumer Guide)	B−
Pitchfork	6.3/10
PopMatters	7/10
Slant Magazine	3.5/5 stars
Tiny Mix Tapes	4/5
Vibe	3/5

Kamaal the Abstract received generally positive reviews from music critics. At Metacritic, which assigns a normalized rating out of 100 to reviews from mainstream critics, the album received an average score of 78, based on 13 reviews. Amid Kamaal the Abstract's original planned release, promotional copies had been distributed and several publications ran reviews of the album. AllMusic writer John Bush considered it superior to Q-Tip's debut album Amplified. Slant Magazine editor Sal Cinquemani called the album "a genre-defying blend of nü-jazz, '70s soul, rock, and funk". Despite writing that it does not reach its potential, Karen R. Good of Vibe perceived it as a progression from Amplified and described it as "closer to the rooted, love-sexy album we, the people, expect from the musicologist". Entertainment Weekly's David Browne called the album "one of the most head-scratching albums ever made by a prominent rapper", commenting that it "feels like a worthy experiment abandoned halfway through; it doesn't end so much as nod off". Nathan Rabin of The A.V. Club wrote that the album "sounds like the sort of disc that gets rappers released from their contracts … it's invigorating to listen to a relaxed and playful Q-Tip follow his muse ever further off the beaten path". Blender complimented Q-Tip's musicianship and gave the album four out of five stars.

The New Zealand Herald gave the album four out of four stars upon its 2009 release, noting that Q-Tip "came up with something timeless then – and nine years on it sounds fresh, inventive and cosmic", and adding that the album has a "unique coolness to it and it still sounds ahead of its time in 2009". However, Robert Christgau named it "dud of the month" in his consumer guide for MSN Music, in which he wrote that most of the tracks are musically incomplete and, "in the narrow sense of rhythm tracks, the beats have some ass to them, but as music they revert to fusion kitsch whenever the artiste sees an opening". Pitchfork critic David Drake commented that "Kamaal the Abstract is not a great record by any means. But it is an interesting one, a unique effort by an artist struggling to mesh [jazz and hip hop]", viewing that "each track is a loose framework of unfulfilled promise". William Grant of Drowned in Sound viewed that it "seems a bit aimless at times", but ultimately praised its diverse sound and gave it an eight out of 10 rating. Dave Heaton of PopMatters commented that the album is "mainly about feeling. There’s no storytelling meat to the songs, less wit, not much of Q-Tip’s creative approach to language. It’s mostly about riding the groove, and that Q-Tip does well".

== Track listing ==
All tracks were produced by Q-Tip.

No.	Title	Writer(s)	Length
1.	"Feelin"	Fareed, C. Sholar	4:32
2.	"Do You Dig U?" (featuring Kurt Rosenwinkel & Gary Thomas)	Fareed, Kats, K. Sholar	7:19
3.	"A Million Times"	Fareed, Kats	4:16
4.	"Blue Girl"	Fareed, K. Sholar	5:20
5.	"Barely in Love"	Fareed, Kats	4:03
6.	"Heels"	Fareed, K. Sholar	3:07
7.	"Abstractionisms" (featuring Kenny Garrett a.k.a. Truth)	Fareed	5:19
8.	"Caring"	Fareed, K. Sholar	1:40
9.	"Even If It Is So"	Fareed, Kats, C. Sholar	5:30

Bonus tracks
No.	Title	Writer(s)	Length
10.	"Make It Work" (CD, LP bonus track)	Fareed, Rosenwinkel	3:59
11.	"Damn You’re Cool" (LP, iTunes bonus track)	Fareed	3:38

Japan bonus track
No.	Title	Writer(s)	Length
11.	"Barely In Love" (Muro's Back To 1970 Remix)	Fareed, Kats	3:37

== Personnel ==
Credits for Kamaal the Abstract adapted from liner notes.

- Vic Anesini – material
- Johnathan Blake – drums
- Danny Clinch – photography
- Kamaal Fareed (Q-Tip) – synthesizer, bass, drums, keyboards, vocals, vocals (background), bells, clapping, drum programming, drum overdubs, mini Moog, producer, engineer, executive producer, mixing
- Guyora Kats – bass, guitar, piano, guitar (rhythm), vocals (background), clavinet, Fender Rhodes
- Aisha Morris – vocals
- Kenny Garrett – alto saxophone
- Kurt Rosenwinkel – guitar, guitar (rhythm), keyboards
- Chris Sholar – guitar, guitar (rhythm), vocals (background), soloist
- Kelvin Sholar – organ, synthesizer, piano, Fender Rhodes, soloist
- Sun Singleton – vocals
- Steve Souder – mixing
- Denise Trorman – art direction, design

== Charts ==
Chart (2009)	Peak position
US Billboard 200	77
US Independent Albums (Billboard)	12
US Top R&B/Hip-Hop Albums (Billboard)	32

== See also ==
- Love for Sale (Bilal album)

== Bibliography ==
- William Jelani Cobb (2007). To the Break of Dawn: A Freestyle on the Hip Hop Aesthetic. NYU Press. ISBN 978-0-8147-1670-0.
