= GS Boyz =

American hip hop group

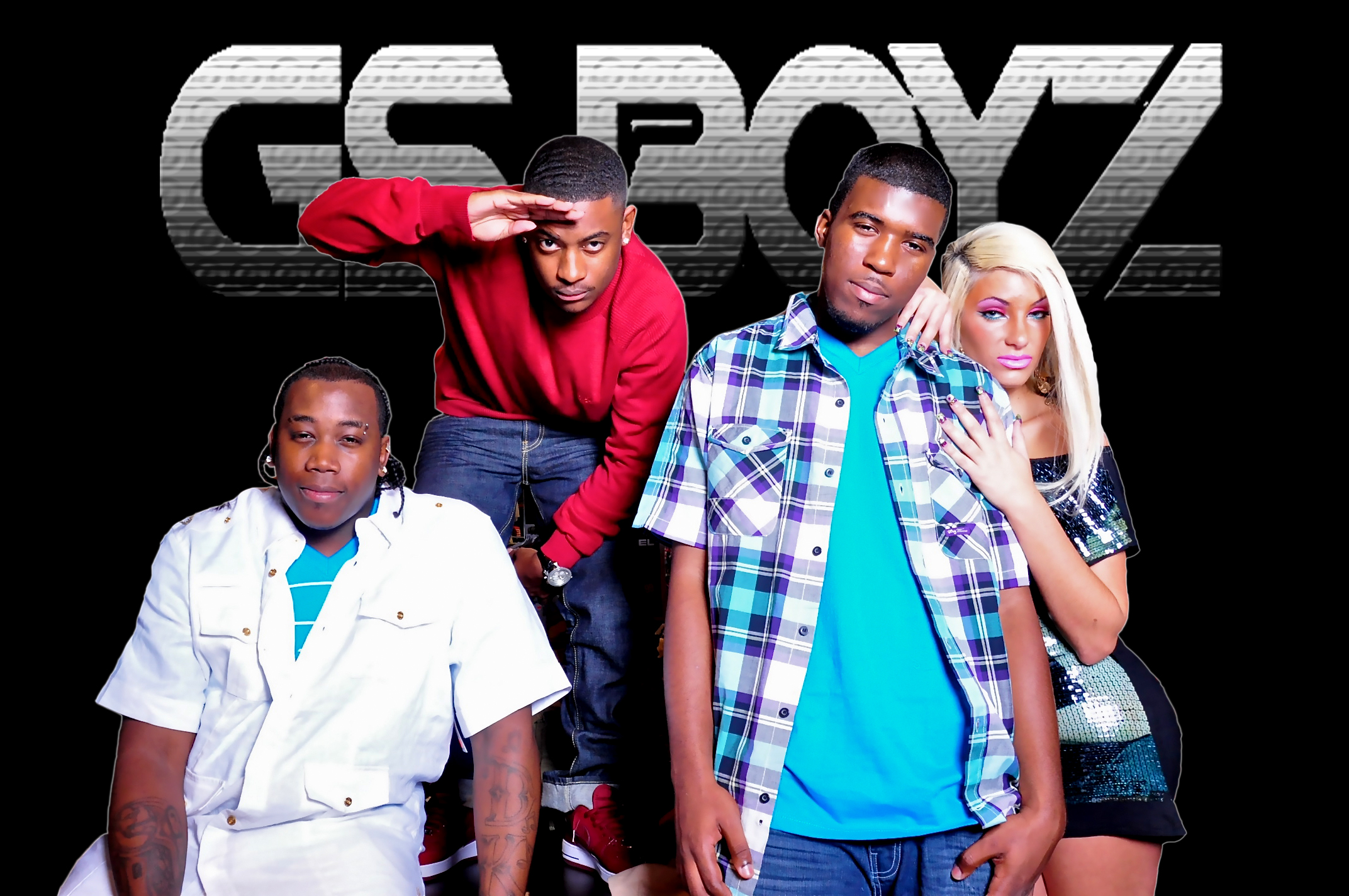
- GS Boyz in 2013

Background information
- Also known as: G-Spot Boyz
- Origin: Arlington, Texas, U.S.
- Genres: Hip hop, snap music, crunk
- Years active: 2005–present
- Labels: Battery, J, Polo Grounds

GS Boyz (explicitly G-Spot Boyz) are an American snap group from Arlington, Texas, formed in 2005. They are best known for their 2008 debut single "Stanky Legg," which peaked within the top 50 of the Billboard Hot 100. The song was re-released as a commercial single by Yung Joc's Swagg Team Entertainment in a joint venture with Battery and J Records after charting. Their follow up single, "Booty Dew" was released the following year. In September 2017, they released the single "Off Top".

== Biography ==
The members of GS Boyz were friends at Bowie High School in Arlington. GS Boyz had many regional hits in its early stages, including "Hit the G-Spot", "Twisted", "He Don't Deserve You", and "First Time.", signed to Yung Joc's label Swagg Team Entertainment in November 2008. Before signing with a major label, the group's debut single "Stanky Legg" peaked at #49 on the Billboard Hot 100 and #7 on the Hot Rap Tracks chart. Its music video topped the countdown on BET's 106 & Park in February 2009. The group also released a remix of "Stanky Legg" with Trina. "Stanky Legg" is based on a dance movement from Dallas TX .

According to Shaheem Reid of MTV News, the "Stanky Legg" dance is part of Dallas's "D-Town Boogie" scene. The GS Boyz performed the dance on Snoop Dogg's talk show on MTV, Dogg After Dark. They asserted to the world that they compose more than only "dance songs".

By 2018, following legal issues, the group only consisted of Mr. Marc D and Slizz.

== Discography ==
=== Singles ===
Year	Single	Peak chart positions			Certifications
Year	Single	US	US R&B	US Rap	Certifications
2008	"Stanky Legg"	49	17	7	RIAA: Gold
2009	"Booty Dew"	—	62	—	
2011	"Falling Down"	—	—	—	
2011	"I Wanna C Ya (Whoop! Da D Doo)"	—	—	—	
2011	"Lovin So Good"	—	—	—	
"—" denotes releases that did not chart

== Awards and nominations ==
- BET Awards
  - 2009: Best Group (nominated)
