= Rap God =

2013 single by Eminem

Single by Eminem

from the album The Marshall Mathers LP 2
- Released: October 15, 2013
- Recorded: 2011–2013
- Studio: Effigy Studios, Ferndale, Michigan
- Genre: Hip-hop
- Length: 6:04 (album version); 6:06 (instrumental version)
- Label: Aftermath; Shady; Interscope
- Songwriters: Marshall Mathers; Bigram Zayas; Matthew "Filthy" Delgiorno; Stephen Hacker; Douglas Davis; Richard Walters; Juana Burns; Juanita Lee; Fatima Shaheed; Kim "Arabian Prince" Nazel; Dania Birks
- Producers: DVLP; Filthy (co.)

Eminem singles chronology
| "Survival" (2013) | "Rap God" (2013) | "The Monster" (2013) |

Music video
- "Rap God" on YouTube

"Rap God" is a song by American rapper Eminem. The song premiered via YouTube on October 14, 2013, and was released in the United States on October 15, 2013, as the third single from Eminem's eighth studio album, The Marshall Mathers LP 2 (2013). It contains references to previous conflicts in Eminem's career, as well as to other rappers' conduct.

With 1,560 words, the song entered the Guinness World Records as the hit single that contains the most words. The song was also nominated for a Grammy Award for Best Rap Performance but lost to "I" by Kendrick Lamar.

== Composition ==
The hip hop song references a line from the first Marshall Mathers LP, on the song "I'm Back", where he mentioned the Columbine school shooting, rapping "Take seven kids from Columbine / Put 'em all in a line, add an AK-47, a revolver and a '9." The verse was censored when originally released, and is included in "Rap God" to test public reaction. Eminem references the Clinton–Lewinsky scandal in order to demonstrate his longevity as a dominant force in the rap industry.

Additional references include a conflict between Fabolous and Ray J, Heavy D & the Boyz, planking, The Walking Dead, J. J. Fad's 1988 song "Supersonic", Tupac Shakur, Run-DMC, Pharoahe Monch, Rakim, N.W.A, Eazy-E, Dr. Dre, DJ Yella, Ice Cube, MC Ren, Busta Rhymes, Lakim Shabazz, Waka Flocka Flame, the 2008 Hotstylz song "Lookin Boy", Portal, Marvel and DC Comics, God and the Devil.

"Rap God"
Eminem raps 99 words in 16.45 seconds–an average of 6.1 words per second, or 157 syllables in 16.45 seconds, or 9.54 syllables per second–which he describes as "supersonic speed" (7-22).

In a part of the hip hop track that begins at 4:26, and end at 4:42 Eminem raps 99 words containing 157 syllables in 16.45 seconds—an average of 6.1 words per second, or 9.5 syllables per second—which he describes as "supersonic speed".

The song's production was handled by American hip hop producer Bigram Zayas, professionally known as Develop or DVLP; he has produced songs for rappers such as the Diplomats, Rick Ross and most notably Lil Wayne. The song was co-produced with Matthew "Filthy" Delgiorno. The song's recording session took place at Effigy Studios in Michigan, with brothers Mike and Joe Strange working with Eminem on mixing and engineering the song. Joe Strange also contributed additional keyboarding and programming. On October 14, 2013, DVLP tweeted that the beat was two years old, made in November 2011, and that Eminem recorded the song in 2012. The song entered the 2015 edition of the Guinness Book of World Records in which Eminem is commended for the most words in a hit single, "Rap God", totalling 1,560 words in 6 minutes, 3 seconds.

In the second verse of the song, Eminem raps about his success allowing him to speak at the induction of Run-DMC into the Rock and Roll Hall of Fame and says "...the only hall of fame I'll be inducted in is the alcohol of fame, on the wall of shame." In 2022, he was named as a member of the Rock and Roll Hall of Fame's 2022 induction class. He would perform the song at his performance at the induction ceremony, including the full "summa lumma dooma lumma" fast rapping portion of the third verse of the song.

== Music video ==
On November 21, 2013, Eminem tweeted the trailer for the music video, directed by Rich Lee, and announced it would be released on November 27, 2013. On November 27, 2013, as scheduled, the music video was released on Vevo at 12:00pm ET. Eminem parodied Max Headroom in the music video. There are also references to The Matrix, Dante Alighieri’s Divine Comedy, The Walking Dead, Hellraiser and the video games Pong, Portal and Super Mario Bros. in the video. The video received three nominations at MTV Video Music Awards 2014 in the categories "Best Art Direction", "Best Editing", "Best Visual Effects". On February 15, 2020, the video reached 1 billion views, making it his third video to reach this milestone. The official video also has received over 20 million likes. The music video runs at 23.98 FPS.

== Critical reception ==
Consequence of Sound stated that the song is "anything but godly", the lyricism "falls victim to dated references [...] and the tired technique of using other rappers' monikers to complete rhymes." They also noted that the beat is "pedestrian at best", and that altogether the song "[lacks] the commercial appeal" of "Berzerk". Lijas of Time gave the song a positive review, stating that "the world can expect an immortal recording" based on "Rap God" and the album's lead single, "Berzerk". Jim Farber of the Daily News compared the song to The Marshall Mathers LP, stating that the song "revives the super-sick humor of that era, which comes as a relief after all the internalizations and ruminating of Em’s more recent work". Kory Grow of Rolling Stone also gave the song a positive review, praising that instead of "giving his chorus to an R&B crooner like Rihanna or the New Royales' Liz Rodrigues", "he instead delivers a straight rap refrain about feeling like a rap deity. His verses recall hip-hop history ... as much as his own history". Nick Hill of Contact Music praised the song's rhyming and lyrical content. He exclaimed that the verse beginning at 4:20 best displays Eminem's rapping abilities.

Complex ranked the song number 14 on their list of the 50 best songs of 2013. They commented saying, "'Rap God' is another entry in the "Oh My God, This Guy Raps Better Than Anyone On The Planet" category. Eminem has been adding chapters in that book for over a decade now, so it's easy to sit back with your arms crossed and look unimpressed." Rolling Stone positioned the song at number 15 on their list of the 100 best songs of 2013. They elaborated saying, "Eminem rolls out a six-minute argument for his immortal hip-hop genius, and it's pretty convincing. [...] For pure word-scrambling, syllable-stringing pyrotechnics, no one can touch him." Complex also named Eminem's third verse the third-best rap verse of 2013. They said, "Within the seemingly never-ending verbal waterfall, Em touches on just about anything he could, should or would: his underground origins, the criticisms of his lyrics, the positive power his words have had for so many, and pop culture references. It's all done with impeccable technical tact, including a brief section of triple time mayhem. In other words, this verse captures exactly why the man's become a Rap God."

== Commercial performance ==
The song debuted at number five on the UK Singles Chart and at number one on the UK R&B Chart, despite its late release. It replaced "Berzerk", his first single from the album at that position. In the United States, it debuted at number seven on the Billboard Hot 100 and number two on the Hot R&B/Hip-Hop Songs chart. With the R&B component removed it debuted at number one on the Rap Songs chart. It also debuted at number one on the Digital Songs chart, with over 270,000 downloads sold. "Rap God" was Eminem's seventh top 10 start on the Hot 100, pushing him past Lil Wayne (six) for the most among men in the chart's 55-year history. Since its release, the song has been certified 7× Platinum by the RIAA. and has sold 1,896,000 copies in United States as of September 2017.

== Controversies ==
The lyrics of "Rap God" were criticized by the LGBTQ+ community and its supporters as homophobic, due to lyrics in the song including "You fags think it's all a game" and "Little gay-looking boy / So gay I can barely say it with a straight face-looking boy." and, from the same verse, "Oh vey, that boy's gay, that's all they say lookin' boy." In a Rolling Stone interview, Eminem defended his usage of "faggot" and "gay-looking" by saying he "never really equated those words to actually mean 'homosexual'".

In January 2015, TMZ reported that Chicago-based hip hop trio Hotstylz were suing Eminem and Shady Records for the amount of $8 million, for using a 25-second sample mid-track from their song "Lookin' Boy", without their permission. In February 2016, the lawsuit between Raymond Jones of Hot Stylz and Eminem was dismissed by the judge following an agreement made by the parties.

== Awards and nominations ==
| Year | Ceremony | Award | Result |
|---|---|---|---|
2014
| 2014 | Detroit Music Awards | Outstanding National Single | Nominated |
| 2014 | Detroit Music Awards | Outstanding Video / Major Budget (over $10,000) | Nominated |
| 2014 | World Music Awards | World's Best Song | Nominated |
| 2014 | MTV Video Music Awards | Best Art Direction | Nominated |
| 2014 | MTV Video Music Awards | Best Editing | Won |
| 2014 | MTV Video Music Awards | Best Visual Effects | Nominated |
| 2015 | Grammy Awards | Best Rap Performance | Nominated |
| 2015 | Guinness World Records | Most words in a hit single | Won |

== Track list ==
Digital Download

| No. | Title | Writer(s) | Producer(s) | Length |
|---|---|---|---|---|
| 1. | "Rap God" | Marshall Mathers; Bigram Zayas; Matthew "Filthy" Delgiorno; Stephen Hacker; Douglas Davis; Richard Walters; Dania Birks; Juana Burns; Juanita Lee; Fatima Shaheed; Kim Nazel | DVLP; Filthy^{[a]} | 6:04 |

Notes

- ^{^[a]} signifies a co-producer.

== Personnel ==
Taken from The Marshall Mathers LP 2 Deluxe Edition liner notes:

- Eminem – rapping, mixing, writing
- DVLP – all instruments, production
- Joe Strange – additional keyboards, production, recording
- Mike Strange – mixing, recording
- Tony Campana – recording
- B. Zayas Jr. – writing
- D. Birks – writing
- D. Davis – writing
- F. Shaheed – writing
- J. Burns – writing
- J. Lee – writing
- K. Nazel – writing
- M. Deligiorno – writing
- L. Walters – writing
- S. Hacker – writing

== Charts ==
=== Weekly charts ===
| Chart (2013–2014) | Peak position |
|---|---|
| Australia (ARIA) | 15 |
| Austria (Ö3 Austria Top 40) | 45 |
| Belgium (Ultratip Bubbling Under Flanders) | 65 |
| Belgium Urban (Ultratop Flanders) | 14 |
| Brazil (ABPD) | 43 |
| Canada Hot 100 (Billboard) | 5 |
| Denmark (Tracklisten) | 30 |
| France (SNEP) | 23 |
| Germany (GfK) | 33 |
| Ireland (IRMA) | 16 |
| Italy (FIMI) | 39 |
| Netherlands (Single Top 100) | 53 |
| New Zealand (Recorded Music NZ) | 4 |
| Scottish Singles Sales (Official Charts) | 5 |
| Sweden (Sverigetopplistan) | 46 |
| Switzerland (Schweizer Hitparade) | 31 |
| UK Singles (Official Charts) | 5 |
| UK Hip Hop/R&B (Official Charts) | 1 |
| US Billboard Hot 100 | 7 |
| US Hot R&B/Hip-Hop Songs (Billboard) | 2 |

=== Year-end charts ===
| Chart (2013) | Position |
|---|---|
| US Hot R&B/Hip-Hop Songs (Billboard) | 65 |
| Chart (2014) | Position |
| US Hot R&B/Hip-Hop Songs (Billboard) | 34 |

== Certifications ==
| Region | Certification | Certified units/sales |
|---|---|---|
| Australia (ARIA) | 6× Platinum | 420,000^{‡} |
| Brazil (Pro-Música Brasil) | Diamond | 250,000^{‡} |
| Canada (Music Canada) | Platinum | 80,000^{*} |
| Denmark (IFPI Danmark) | Platinum | 90,000^{‡} |
| Germany (BVMI) | Gold | 150,000^{‡} |
| Italy (FIMI) | Platinum | 50,000^{‡} |
| New Zealand (RMNZ) | 3× Platinum | 90,000^{‡} |
| Sweden (GLF) | Gold | 20,000^{‡} |
| United Kingdom (BPI) | 2× Platinum | 1,200,000^{‡} |
| United States (RIAA) | 7× Platinum | 7,000,000^{‡} |
^{*} Sales figures based on certification alone.^{‡} Sales+streaming figures based on certification alone.

== Release history ==
| Country | Dates | Format | Label |
|---|---|---|---|
| United States | October 15, 2013 | Digital download | Shady, Aftermath, Interscope |
