= Booty Dew =

Single by GS Boyz
- Released: May 2009
- Recorded: 2008
- Length: 3:55
- Label: Battery/Polo Grounds Music/J Records, Swagg Team Entertainment
- Songwriter(s): K. Cherry, D. Kenner, M. Dinkins, M. Griffith, T. Flowers
- Producer(s): D. Hawk

GS Boyz singles chronology
"Stanky Legg" (2008)	"Booty Dew" (2009)	"Falling Down" (2011)

"Booty Dew" is a song by Texas rap group GS Boyz. It was first sampled in their previous single, "Stanky Legg".

== Commercial performance ==
"Booty Dew" debuted at number 82 on the Hot R&B/Hip-Hop Songs chart, later peaking at number 62 in its fifth week. The song stayed on the charts for 12 weeks before falling off. It is the last single from GS Boyz that charted.

== Music video ==
The GS Boyz appeared on BET's 106 & Park to premiere the video of "Booty Dew". It features them performing at a party.

== Charts ==
Chart (2009)	Peak position
US Billboard Hot R&B/Hip-Hop Songs	62
US Billboard R&B/Hip-Hop Airplay	62
US Billboard Mainstream R&B/Hip-Hop	36
