= Hotstylz =

American hip hop group

- Origin: Chicago, Illinois, U.S.
- Genres: Hip hop, snap
- Years active: 2007–present
- Labels: Swagg Team; Block; RCA; Jive
- Members: Krazee; Meatball; Raydio G

Hotstylz is an American hip hop group from Chicago, Illinois, formed in 2007. The trio, composed of Midwest rappers Krazee (Kryss Johnson), Meatball (Garren Hodge), and Raydio G (Raymond Jones), signed with Yung Joc's record label Swagg Team, an imprint of Zomba and RCA Records to release their 2008 debut single "Lookin Boy" (featuring Yung Joc). The song peaked within the top 50 of the Billboard Hot 100 and remains their only charting release. They have released three mixtapes—A.D.D. (2009), Where Yall Been At (2011) and We Back (2016).

== Controversy ==
In 2013, Detroit-based rapper Eminem sampled "Lookin' Boy", for his 2013 hit single, "Rap God". The group claims Eminem did not receive permission to use the sample, nor did he credit or compensate them. In November 2013, Hotstylz released a diss track towards Eminem titled "Rap Fraud", where they sample several of his songs and criticize him for not crediting them. In January 2015, TMZ reported Hotstylz were suing Eminem and Shady Records for the amount of $8 million for using the 6-second sample of "Lookin' Boy" on his song "Rap God" without their permission.

== Discography ==
=== Mixtapes ===
- A.D.D. (2009)
- Where Y'all Been At (2011)
- We Back (2016)

=== Singles ===
Year	Song	Chart positions			Album
Year	Song	U.S. Hot 100	U.S. R&B	U.S. Rap	Album
2008	"Lookin' Boy" (featuring Yung Joc)	47	11	9	Non-album singles
2018	"Oodles of Noodles"	–	–	–	Non-album singles
