= Bad Boy South =

Southern hip hop record label

Bad Boy South is a southern hip hop spin-off label of Bad Boy Records. The label was founded by Sean Combs in 2003.

== History ==
Bad Boy South was founded in 2003 after this signing of 8 Ball & MJG. The label was created to capitalize on the success of southern hip hop and to have one label simply focus on that genre so that the mainstream label could go out and search for other talents. For the first year, 8 Ball & MJG were the only artists on the label.

In 2005, the label signed a deal with Russell "Block" Spencer to cross-promote artists on his label, Block Entertainment. This deal added acts Boyz n da Hood, Gorilla Zoe, Big Gee, Jody Breeze, Duke, and Young Jeezy. Jeezy would leave the label before the group could release their debut album, which sparked controversy as he would start his own label and sign with The Island Def Jam Music Group.

In late 2005, the label would sign Yung Joc, who would quickly become the face of the rising label. In 2006, his debut album New Joc City would take the label to new heights as it would become the label's first Platinum release.

In 2007, the label debuted Boyz n da Hood artist Gorilla Zoe, who became one of the more popular acts on the label. His hit single, "Hood Nigga", would propel his album to a Gold certification. He and Yung Joc both became the label's main two artists. 2007's other release was Joc's Hustlenomics, with his hit "Coffee Shop" with Gorilla Zoe. The label's first act 8 Ball & MJG released their second album for the label, Ridin High. Yung Joc was later released from Bad Boy Records.

== Notable artists ==
- Gorilla Zoe
- Jody Breeze
- Jacquees

== Discography ==
Year	Information
2005	Boyz n da Hood - Boyz n da Hood: Released: June 21, 2005; Singles: "Dem Boyz", "Felonies"
2006	Yung Joc - New Joc City: Released: June 6, 2006; Singles: "It's Goin' Down", "I Know You See It", "1st Time"; RIAA: Gold
2006	8 Ball - Light Up the Bomb: Released: 2006
2006	Big Gee - Small Things to a Giant: Released: 2006
2007	8Ball & MJG - Ridin High: Released: March 13, 2007; Singles: "Relax and Take Notes", "Cruzin", "Clap On"
2007	Yung Joc - Hustlenomics: Released: August 28, 2007; Singles: "Coffee Shop", "Bottle Poppin'"
2007	Gorilla Zoe - Welcome to the Zoo: Released: September 25, 2007; Singles: "Hood Figga", "Tryin' To Make A Jug"
2007	Boyz n da Hood - Back Up n da Chevy: Released: October 2, 2007; Singles: "Everybody Know Me", "Table Dance"
2009	Gorilla Zoe - Don't Feed Da Animals: Released: March 17, 2009; Singles: Lost, "What It Is", "Echo", "I Got It"
2011	Gorilla Zoe - King Kong: Scheduled date: June 14, 2011; Singles: "Twisted"
