= I Know You See It =

Single by Yung Joc featuring Brandy Hambrick

from the album New Joc City
- Released: July 15, 2006 (U.S.)
- Recorded: 2006
- Genre: Southern hip hop, snap
- Length: 4:01 (album version); 3:25 (single version)
- Label: Bad Boy South; Block; Atlantic
- Songwriter: Yung Joc
- Producers: Kochease; Yung Joc

Yung Joc singles chronology
"It's Goin' Down" (2006)	"I Know You See It" (2006)	"I Love You" (2006)

Music video
- "I Know You See It" on YouTube

Audio
- "I Know You See It" on YouTube
- "I Know You See It" (radio edit) on YouTube

"I Know You See It" is a song written and recorded by American rapper Yung Joc. Produced by Kochease, the song features vocals from Brandy "Ms. B" Hambric. It was released as the second single from his debut album New Joc City. It reached number 17 on the Billboard Hot 100 and number five on the U.S. Hot R&B/Hip-Hop Songs chart. It also peaked at number five on the U.S. Rap Songs chart. The music video for the song first premiered on MTV's Making the Video.

== Background ==
The chorus' lyrics interpolate a famous children's counting rhyme in English-speaking countries (Eeny Meeny Miny Moe).

== Music video ==
In the music video Yung Joc is partying at his house showing around his "exclusive tour" with girls. The ending of the video features a short scene where he starts to sing his song "Dope Boy Magic."

== Charts ==
=== Weekly charts ===
Chart (2006)	Peak Position
US Billboard Hot 100	17
US Hot R&B/Hip-Hop Songs (Billboard)	5
US Hot Rap Songs (Billboard)	2
US Pop Airplay (Billboard)	35
US Rhythmic Airplay (Billboard)	1

=== Year-end charts ===
Chart (2006)	Position
US Billboard Hot 100	70
US Hot R&B/Hip-Hop Songs (Billboard)	33
US Rhythmic (Billboard)	22
