= Kelvin Sholar =

American musician (born 1973)

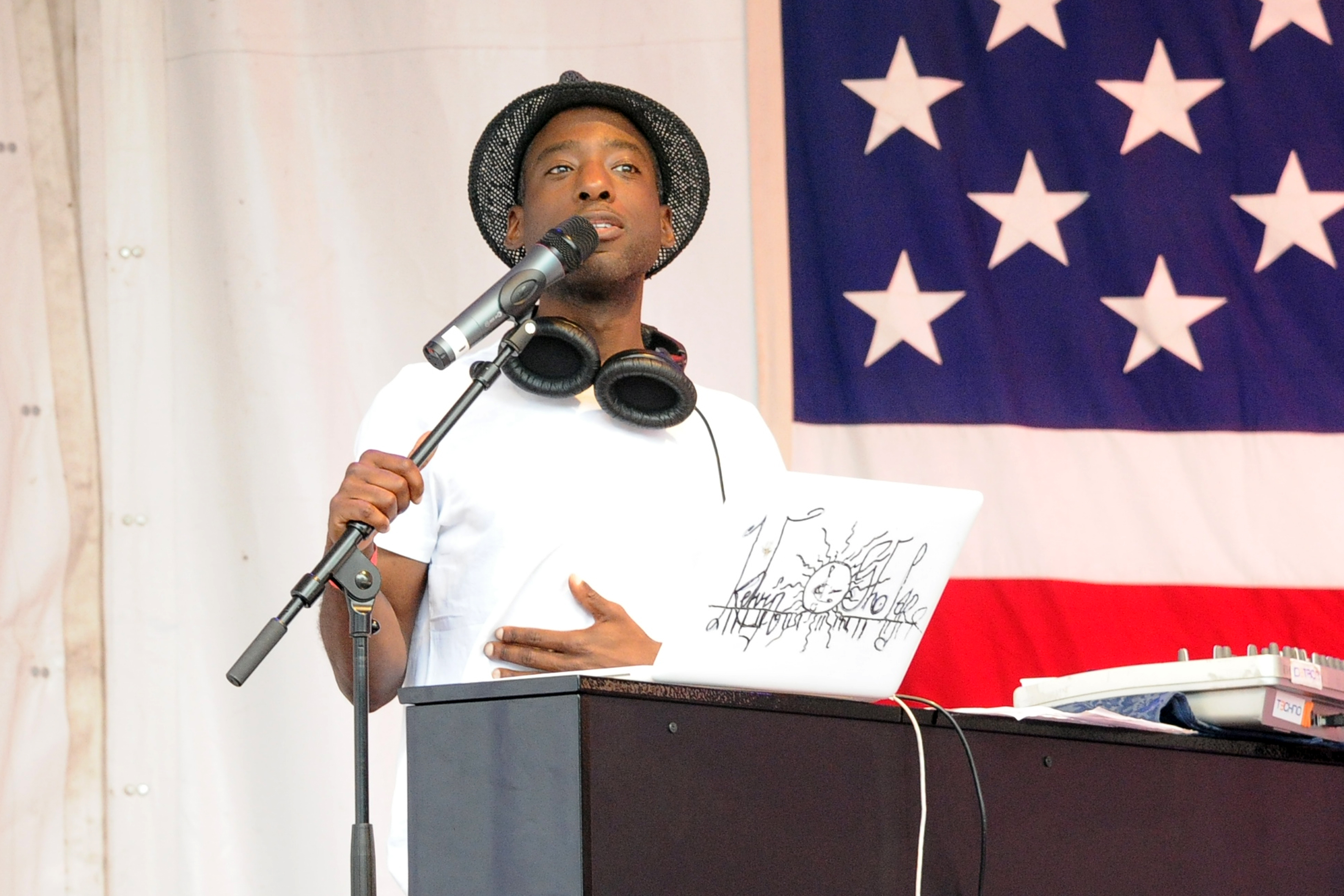
Kelvin Sholar performing in Berlin (2016)

Kelvin Lamar Sholar (born May 22, 1973) is an American pianist, bandleader, producer and composer. Sholar has performed piano, keyboards and electronics on several international television shows and radio shows, written for films, his music has been featured on prime-time American television, he has been interviewed and filmed by iconic American director Spike Lee, and he has performed, collaborated and recorded with many of the greatest artists in the world—from improvising on the piano with the New York City Ballet, to recording on Fender Rhodes, organ and synth with QTip, from arranging and conducting a live orchestra with Carl Craig's Innerzone to singing live with Stevie Wonder before thousands.

Kelvin Sholar has recorded and performed extensively in top level festivals and musical venues in major cities all over the world as a leader of his own ensemble and a sideman, he has been awarded over 10 musical awards, and he has given master classes on music in many international schools- including: the Phillipos Nakas Conservatory (Athens, Greece), Cite de la Musique (Marseilles, France), North Carolina Central University (Durham, NC, USA), Kyo Rei Hall (Tokyo, Japan), Escola International (São Paulo, Brazil), Porto Jazz school (Porto, Portugal), and Columbia University (New York, USA).

Notable Recognition: Best of Music/ Artforum International (2009), Winner of Scholarships from James Tatum Foundation For The Arts (1989 and 1990), Winner of the Michigan Bach Festival Competition (1990), IAJE Outstanding musician in Montreaux/Detroit Jazz Festival (1991), Outstanding musician in Aquinas Jazz Festival (1992), Best Soloist, and Best Band in WEMU/Heritage Jazz Festival (1993), Outstanding pianist at The Clark Terry Jazz Camp (1994), Outstanding musicianship/ Elmhurst Jazz Festival (1995 and 1996), Outstanding musicianship/ Wichita Jazz Festival (1995 and 1996).
