= It's Goin' Down (Yung Joc song) =

Single by Yung Joc featuring Nitti

from the album New Joc City
- Released: April 15, 2006
- Recorded: August 2005
- Genre: Snap; southern hip hop
- Length: 4:01
- Label: Bad Boy South; Block; Atlantic
- Songwriters: Chadron Moore; Jasiel Robinson
- Producer: Nitti

Yung Joc featuring Nitti singles chronology
"It's Goin' Down" (2006)	"I Know You See It" (2006)

Music video
- "It's Goin' Down" on YouTube

Audio
- "It's Goin' Down" on YouTube

"It's Goin' Down" is the debut single by American hip hop artist Yung Joc, released on April 15, 2006. It is from his debut album New Joc City. The song was written by Yung Joc and Chadron Moore, the song was produced by and features Nitti.

== Composition ==
The song is part of the snap genre, popular in hip hop music from the Southern United States. The title is slang for describing a "good time." According to Stereogum the track features an "insistent" beat, with Yung Joc's rapping style showcasing a "nonchalant T.I.-esque flow".

== Music video ==
Directed by Lenny Bass, a music video for "It's Goin' Down" was filmed in early March 2006. It took place at various locations in the Atlanta area, including the corner of Rocky Ford Road and Hosea Williams Drive at the Kirkwood neighborhood and a clothing store in Belvedere Plaza. It premiered on 106 & Park on March 30, 2006. Yung Joc and other cast members ride in the 1969 Oldsmobile Cutlass. Making cameos in this video included rapper Killer Mike, two members of the R&B group Cherish, and producer Nitti.

== Commercial performance ==
"It's Goin' Down" performed very well in the U.S., peaking at number 3 on the Billboard Hot 100 on June 24, 2006. It peaked at number 1 on the Billboard Hot R&B/Hip-Hop Songs chart for eight weeks beginning on June 3, 2006.

This single and successor "I Know You See It" both earned Platinum RIAA certification on December 14, 2006, for selling one million copies.

== Critical reception and awards ==
David Jeffries of allmusic called the song "a simple, familiar-sounding bit of Southern weekend music that withstands numerous replays." Sonia Murray of Yung Joc's hometown Atlanta Journal-Constitution newspaper described the beat as having "sharp, insistent keyboards" and the lyrics as "simple...[but] infectious."

Brian Sims of HipHopDX was more critical in his review: "hypnotic, even if the flow is not" and "nothing fancy, just bar after monotonous bar." Tom Breihan of Pitchfork also had negative feedback: "just a clicking drumbeat, a maddeningly repetitive synth line, and a swaggery brag-rap."

In year-end lists, Rolling Stone ranked "It's Goin' Down" no. 79 in its year-end "100 Best Songs of the Year" list in 2006 for showing "the power of a pure, synthy snap beat and a singsongy rhyme." The January 2007 issue of Vibe ranked the song 15th in its "60 Songs of '06" list.

"It's Goin' Down" was a nominee for the Grammy Award for Best Rap Song in 2007, which went to "Money Maker" by Ludacris featuring Pharrell. However, it won the Hip-Hop Track of the Year award at the BET Awards 2006.

== Remixes ==
Five remixes were made for this song: the official remix features Rick Ross, Slim Thug, and Jody Breeze; one adds a verse by Cam'ron to the official remix; one features Trae; the last features Lil Wayne, Rick Ross and Currency. Rapper Lydell Lucky made a remix to the song as well, which features Paul Wall, Trae and others.

== Charts ==
=== Weekly charts ===
Chart (2006)	Peak position
UK Hip Hop/R&B (Official Charts)	24
UK Singles (OCC)	191
US Billboard Hot 100	3
US Hot R&B/Hip-Hop Songs (Billboard)	1
US Hot Rap Songs (Billboard)	1
US Pop Airplay (Billboard)	20
US Pop 100 (Billboard)	8
US Rhythmic Airplay (Billboard)	1

=== Year-end charts ===
Chart (2006)	Position
US Billboard Hot 100	18
US Hot R&B/Hip-Hop Songs (Billboard)	4
US Rhythmic (Billboard)	6

== Certifications ==
Region	Certification	Certified units/sales
United States (RIAA)	3× Platinum	3,000,000^{^}
^{^} Shipments figures based on certification alone.
