= King Kong (Gorilla Zoe album) =

Studio album by Gorilla Zoe
- Released: June 14, 2011
- Recorded: 2009–2011
- Genre: Hip hop
- Length: 51:18
- Label: Block; eOne
- Producer: Church Boi; Demarco; DJ Affect; DJ Montay; DJ Spinz; Drumma Boy; ID Labs; Nicholas Balding; Saleem "Lazyboi" Asad; Sonny Digital; Willie "Chuck" Shivers

Gorilla Zoe chronology
Don't Feed da Animals (2009)	King Kong (2011)

Singles from King Kong
- 1. "What's Goin On" Released: December 14, 2010; 2. "Twisted" Released: February 14, 2011; 3. "Crazy" Released: June 14, 2011

Professional ratings
Review scores
Source	Rating
AllMusic	3.5/5 stars

King Kong is the third solo studio album by American rapper Gorilla Zoe. It was released on June 14, 2011 via Block Entertainment and Entertainment One. Production was handled by Sonny Digital, Drumma Boy and DJ Montay among others. It features guest appearances from Gucci Mane, Lil' Jon, Ray Dinero and Yo Gotti.

The album debuted at number 56 on the Billboard 200, number 12 on the Top R&B/Hip-Hop Albums, number 8 on the Top Rap Albums and number 9 on the Independent Albums charts, selling 10,300 copies in the United States in its first week. It was preceded by three singles: "What's Goin On", "Twisted" and "Crazy".

== Track listing ==
No.	Title	Writer(s)	Producer(s)	Length
1.	"King Kong"	Alonzo Mathis; Christopher James Gholson	Drumma Boy	4:03
2.	"I Do It"	Mathis; William Shivers; Saleem Asad	Willie "Chuck" Shivers; Lazyboi	3:50
3.	"Crazy" (featuring Gucci Mane)	Mathis; Radric Delantic Davis; Sonny Corey Uwaezuoke; Jesse W. Wilson; Rico Brooks	Sonny Digital; Jesse "Corparal" Wilson (co.)	4:06
4.	"Nasty" (featuring Yo Gotti)	Mathis; Mario Mims; Uwaezuoke; Brooks	Sonny Digital	3:08
5.	"At All" (featuring Ray Dinero)	Mathis; Ray Dinero; Uwaezuoke; Brooks	Sonny Digital	3:24
6.	"What's Goin' On"	Mathis; Uwaezuoke	Sonny Digital	3:47
7.	"Party Over Here"	Mathis; Gholson	Drumma Boy	3:47
8.	"Your Bitch"	Mathis; Uwaezuoke	Sonny Digital	3:34
9.	"My Shawty"	Mathis; Uwaezuoke; Brooks	Sonny Digital	3:20
10.	"Twisted" (featuring Lil' Jon)	Mathis; Jonathan Smith; Montay Desmond Humphrey; William Larkin Jones; Korey Roberson; James Edward Smith III	DJ Montay	2:57
11.	"Turn Me On"	Mathis; Church Boi	Church Boi; DJ Affect; Chris Hamer (co.)	4:22
12.	"Main Thing"	Mathis; Nicholas Balding	Nicholas Balding; Calvo Da Gr8 (co.)	3:27
13.	"It's Over"	Mathis; Gary Rafael Hill	DJ Spinz	3:25
14.	"I'm Not Perfect"	Mathis; Collin Demar Edwards	Demarco; ID Labs	4:08
Total length:				51:18

Best Buy exclusive bonus tracks
No.	Title	Writer(s)	Producer(s)	Length
15.	"Liquor in My Cup"	Mathis; Jared John Beam	J Beam	3:32
16.	"Work Hard"	Mathis; Xavier Dotson	Zaytoven	3:23
17.	"Mile High Club"		Kevin Erondu	3:38

== Charts ==
Chart (2011)	Peak position
US Billboard 200	56
US Top R&B/Hip-Hop Albums (Billboard)	12
US Top Rap Albums (Billboard)	8
US Independent Albums (Billboard)	9
