= Stanky Legg =

Single by GS Boyz
- Released: August 15, 2008
- Recorded: February – April 2008; The Wishing Well (DeSoto, Texas)
- Genre: Snap
- Length: 4:00
- Label: Battery; Polo Grounds; J; Swagg Team
- Songwriters: Keithian Sammons; Marcus Dinkins; Telson Flowers; Matthew Griffith; Decory Kenner; Charles Smith
- Producer: Ryan ESL

GS Boyz singles chronology
"Stanky Legg" (2008)	"Booty Dew" (2009)

"Stanky Legg" is a song by American hip hop trio GS Boyz, released on August 15, 2008 as their commercial debut single. The trio performed the single at BET's annual fashion show Rip the Runway.

== Music video ==
The music video for the song was directed by Kai Crawford and released in February 2009. It went on to reach the number-one spot on the urban music countdown TV series 106 & Park and received moderate play on MTV Jams. It ranked at #26 on BET's Notarized Top 100 Videos of 2009 countdown.

== Stanky Legg dance ==
Tutorial for the dance

The "Stanky Legg" is a multi-step dance that involves the circular movement of the dancer's leg, with an alternation between legs. The dance also contains elements of dances such as the "Booty Dew" and the "Dougie".

=== Notable instances ===
At the 2009 FIFA Confederations Cup, U.S. forwards Jozy Altidore and Charlie Davies used this dance as their goal celebration, making it a popular reference in the U.S. Soccer scene.

During Super Bowl LVII, Travis Kelce caught the football, scored a touchdown, and immediately celebrated with the dance..

During the 2026 Chicago Bears season, head coach Ben Johnson started including his variation of the Stanky Legg during post-game locker room celebrations.

== Charts ==
=== Weekly charts ===
Chart (2009)	Peak position
US Billboard Hot 100	49
US Billboard Hot R&B/Hip-Hop Songs	17
US Billboard Hot Rap Tracks	7
US Billboard Pop 100	58

=== Year-end charts ===
Chart (2009)	Position
US Hot R&B/Hip-Hop Songs (Billboard)	66

== Release history ==
Region	Date	Format(s)	Label	Ref.
United States	February 3, 2009	Contemporary hit radio	Swagg Team, Battery, Jive, Zomba	
