= Battery Records (hip-hop) =

- Parent company: Sony Music Entertainment (SME)
- Founded: August 2008
- Founder: Neil Levine
- Defunct: October 2011
- Distributor: Jive Records
- Genre: Hip hop
- Country of origin: United States
- Location: New York City, NY
- Official website: Battery Records.net

Battery Records was a hip-hop label started by Neil Levine under Zomba Label Group, which is owned by Sony Music Entertainment. The label was launched mid-2008 by Sony BMG Music Entertainment. The label primarily focused on new talent, often overseeing early-stage development for acts that were destined for other labels such as J Records or Jive. However, it also served established artists looking for non-traditional deals, such as releasing Q-Tip's solo album Kamaal the Abstract, which had been shelved nearly seven years prior. In September 2011, Levine left Battery before Jive shut down in the following month.

== Artists ==
- 6 Tre G
- Ace Valentine
- Chalie Boy
- D.C. Don Juan
- GS Boyz
- Li'l Goonie
- Louisiana Ca$h
- The Party Boyz
- Q-Tip
- Sir Will
- Sunny Valentine
- Velaté
- V.I.C.
- Mickey Factz
- S Dub "The Greatest"

== Discography ==
| Cat. No. | Artist | Title | Format | Type | Release date |
|---|---|---|---|---|---|
| ? | GS Boyz | "Stanky Legg" | CD, digital | Single | 2008-08-15 |
| ? | GS Boyz | "Booty Dew" | CD, digital | Single | 2009-06-02 |
| 88697 55519 | Q-Tip | Kamaal the Abstract | CD, vinyl | Album | 2009-09-15 |
| ? | Ace Valentine ft. V.I.C. | "Tonight" | Digital | Single | 2010–3–29 |

== See also ==
- List of record labels
- Zomba Label Group
- Jive Records
