= Nitti (producer) =

American rapper

Nitti Beatz
- Also known as: Nitti, Frank Nitti
- Born: Chadron Moore
- Origin: Decatur, Georgia, U.S.
- Genres: Hip hop, R&B
- Occupations: Record producer; rapper; DJ
- Years active: 1998-present
- Labels: So So Def Productions, Inc.; Playmaker Music, LLC.; Nitti Beatz Recordings; 300 Entertainment

Chadron Moore, better known by his stage name Nitti Beatz, is an American record producer who has been active since 2000 and signed to So So Def Recordings from 2005 to 2008.

He was credited as a producer on 8Ball's second album Almost Famous. He did production work on many projects released through Jermaine Dupri's So So Def label. He founded the production company Playmaker Music in 2002, in which they sign artists, producers, & songwriters to deals under this imprint. Nitti plays many different instruments. Playmaker Music inked a non-exclusive distribution deal with 300 Entertainment in 2016. Playmaker is based in Atlanta, Ga.

== Discography ==
=== Albums ===
- Most Wanted Presents Live or Die in G.I w/h Don Vito (1998)
- Don't Take It Personal (2002)
- "Relentless" (2006)
- Ghettoville U.S.A. (2010)
- Throw a Beat On (2011)
- 808 King (2013)
- Old Dope (2015)
- Be-frenemies (2017)

=== Featured singles ===
- 1998: "In Decatur (Remix) Ghetto Mafia
- 2001: "Stop Playin' Games" 8ball of 8ball & MJG
- 2004: "Dem Boyz" Boyz n da Hood featuring Nitti)
- 2005: "Go Head" (Gucci Mane featuring Mac Bree-Z)
- 2006: "It's Goin' Down" (Yung Joc featuring Nitti)
- 2007: "Stunt Hard" (Jody Breeze)
- 2010: "Bring It Back" (8Ball & MJG featuring Nitti & Young Dro)
- 2010: "Get Big" (Dorrough featuring Nitti)
- 2013: "Sucka" (Rocko featuring Too Short)
- 2015: "Flex (Ooh, Ooh, Ooh)" (Rich Homie Quan)
- 2015: "Bust It" (Bankroll Fresh)
- 2015: "In Ya Life (Webbie)

=== Personal life ===
In 2008, Nitti welcomed a son born in Atlanta, Ga. He once stated, "I always wanted to be a father to a son since I was raised by my mother without a father".
