= Gorilla Zoe =

American rapper

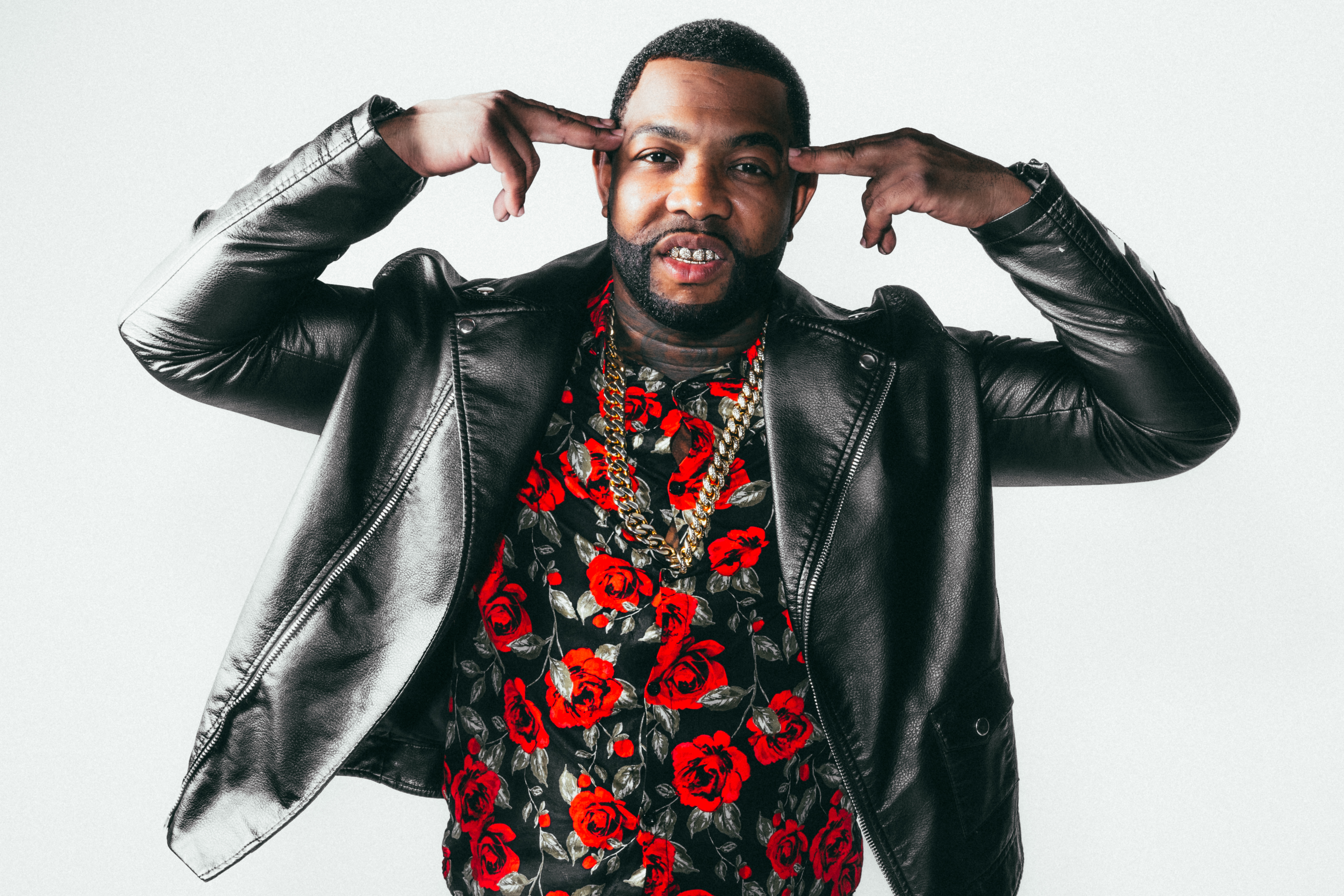
- Gorilla Zoe in a press photo, 2017

Background information
- Born: Alonzo Keith Mathis Jr. January 26, 1983 (age 43); Atlanta, Georgia, U.S.
- Genres: Southern hip-hop
- Occupations: Rapper; songwriter
- Years active: 2005–present
- Labels: Hood Figga; Real Talk; International Music; Strong Arm; E1; Atlantic; Bad Boy South; 65; Block
- Formerly of: Boyz n da Hood

Alonzo Keith Mathis Jr. (born January 26, 1983), better known by his stage name Gorilla Zoe (/ˈzoʊ/), is an American rapper from East Point, Georgia. He joined the Bad Boy Records hip hop group Boyz n da Hood in 2006, following the departure of its lead member, Jeezy. His first album with the group, Back Up n da Chevy (2007) was met with lukewarm critical and commercial reception, leading to their subsequent disbandment. He then signed with Bad Boy, an imprint of Atlantic Records in a joint venture with Block Entertainment as a solo act to release his debut studio album, Welcome to the Zoo (2007).

Welcome to the Zoo, despite mixed critical reception, peaked within the top 20 of the Billboard 200 and was led by the Billboard Hot 100-top 40 single "Hood Nigga". His second album, Don't Feed Da Animals (2009) peaked within the top ten of the chart and served as his final release with Bad Boy, while his third, King Kong (2011), peaked at number 56.

== Career ==
In 2006, Mathis replaced Young Jeezy as a member of Boyz N Da Hood. He first saw success in collaborations with Yung Joc's "Coffee Shop" and "Bottle Poppin'," which charted on several Billboard charts. He was then signed as a solo artist for Block Entertainment and Bad Boy South.

On April 24, 2007, Gorilla Zoe released his first single, "Hood Nigga", which was a success, peaking at #38 on the Billboard Hot 100. His debut solo album, Welcome to the Zoo, was released in October 2007, peaking at #18 on the Billboard 200, #8 on Top R&B/Hip-Hop Albums, and #3 on Top Rap Albums. In 2007, Gorilla Zoe was chosen for the 2008 XXL Freshmen cover along with rappers Saigon, Plies, Rich Boy, Joell Ortiz, Lupe Fiasco, Lil Boosie, Crooked I, Papoose, and Young Dro.

On October 7, 2008, "Lost", Gorilla Zoe's first single from his second album, was released. The full album, Don't Feed da Animals, was released on March 17, 2009, topping the Billboard Top Rap Albums chart. It sold 29,000 copies in its first week, peaking on the Billboard 200 at #8. A second single from the album, "What It Is", featuring Rick Ross and Kollosus, was later released, and a third single, "Echo", followed.

During February 2010, Gorilla Zoe released a mixtape every day on the mixtape website DatPiff.com. He released an EP, I Am Atlanta 3. He also worked on a mixtape with Die-Verse City member Qu1k.

On June 14, 2011, Gorilla Zoe released his third solo album, King Kong. Although not as successful as his previous albums, it charted on the Billboard 200 at #56, selling 10,300 copies in its first week out. Allmusic rated the album three-and-a-half stars out of five. A single from the album, "What's Goin' On", was released on December 14, 2010, and peaked at #99 at the Billboard Hot R&B/Hip-Hop Songs Chart.

On May 6, 2014, after a two-year hiatus, Gorilla Zoe released a new mixtape, Recovery, and it was revealed that he had signed to rapper Flo Rida's label International Music Group.

In July 2018, Gorilla Zoe released "Fat Jesus", his first single as an independent artist.

== Discography ==
- 2007: Welcome to the Zoo
- 2009: Don't Feed da Animals
- 2011: King Kong
- 2017: Don't Feed da Animals 2
- 2017: Gorilla Warfare
- 2019: I Am Atlanta 4ever
- 2020: 31 DAYS OF COVID-19
- 2020: Summer of the Flying Saucer
- 2020: Vaccine
- 2020: Don’t Feed the Animals 3
- 2025: Don't Feed the Animals 4
