= Yung Joc =

American rapper (born 1980)

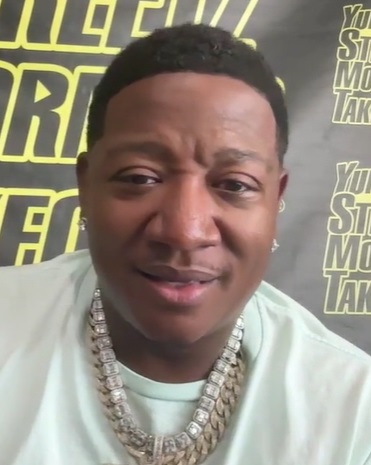
- Yung Joc in 2024

Background information
- Born: Jasiel Amon Robinson; September 20, 1980 (age 46); Atlanta, Georgia, U.S.
- Genre: Southern hip-hop
- Occupations: Rapper; songwriter
- Labels: Swagg Team; Bad Boy South; Atlantic; J; Block; RCA; Polo Grounds
- Spouse: Kendra Robinson (m. 2021)
- Children: 9

Jasiel Amon Robinson (born September 20, 1980), better known by his stage name Yung Joc, is an American rapper known for his 2006 single "It's Goin' Down", which peaked at number three on the Billboard Hot 100. Prior to its release, he signed with Puff Daddy's Bad Boy South, an imprint of Atlantic Records, in a joint venture with Block Entertainment; the song served as lead single for his debut studio album, New Joc City (2006). The album and its sequel, Hustlenomics (2007), both peaked at number three on the Billboard 200 despite mixed critical responses. He is also known for his guest appearance on T-Pain's 2007 single "Buy U a Drank (Shawty Snappin')", which peaked atop the Billboard Hot 100.

== Early life ==
Robinson's father owned a hair-care products company and helped him get an opportunity to write a jingle for Revlon. Robinson then founded his own label, Mastermind, to release his music.

== Music career ==
=== 2005–2006: New Joc City ===
Robinson met Atlanta producer Nitti Beatz and the two recorded the hit "It's Goin Down" in the spring of 2005. After teaming with Russell "Block" Spencer, founder of the Block Enterprises label, Spencer signed Robinson to Sean Combs's Bad Boy South for a multimillion-dollar deal, and Bad Boy released Robinson's debut New Joc City the following year. Robinson was also featured on the songs "Show Stopper" by Danity Kane (from Diddy's Making the Band 4) and Cassie's album track "Call U Out". Robinson was on Forbes' 2006 "Richest Rappers List", ranking at No. 20, having grossed approximately $10 million that year. "It's Goin' Down" reached No. 3 on the Billboard Hot 100 and No. 1 on the Hot Rap Tracks chart. The next single, "I Know U See It", reached No. 17 on the Hot 100 and No. 2 on the Hot Rap Tracks.

=== 2007–2009: Hustlenomics ===
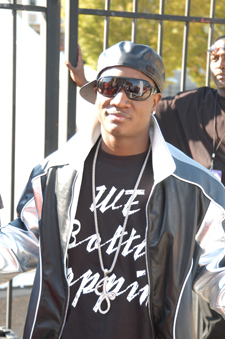
Yung Joc in 2007

Robinson's next album, Hustlenomics, was released in 2007, with the singles "Coffee Shop" (featuring The-Dream and Gorilla Zoe) and "Bottle Poppin'" (featuring Gorilla Zoe). Hustlenomics sold 69,000 copies in its first week of release, debuting at number three on the Billboard 200. As of April 2009, it had sold approximately 197,000 copies, according to Nielsen Soundscan.

In 2007, Robinson was featured on "Lookin Boy", a song by his protégés and label signees, hip hop group Hotstylz. In 2008, Robinson was featured on the hit singles "Get Like Me" by David Banner, "So Fly" by Slim, and "Beep" by Bobby V. In 2009, he was featured on Day26 single "Imma Put It on Her". Robinson released a mixtape entitled Grind Flu for free on his label Swagg Team Entertainment on August 11, 2009.

=== 2010–2014: Mr. Robinson's Neighborhood ===
Robinson released his first single from the album Mr. Robinson's Neighborhood, "Yeah Boy", in 2010. A music video for the single was also released.

On October 7, 2011, RCA Music Group announced it was disbanding J Records along with Arista Records and Jive Records. With the shutdown, Robinson (and all other artists previously signed to these three labels) were to release his future material (including Mr. Robinson's Neighborhood) on the RCA Records brand.

On March 18, 2014, Robinson released his first official single, "I Got Bitches", from his upcoming third album. On September 11, 2014, he released his second single from his upcoming album, "Features", featuring former collaborator and singer T-Pain.

== Other ventures ==
=== Swagg Team Entertainment ===
Swagg Team Entertainment
- Founded: 2008
- Founder: Jasiel "Yung Joc" Robinson (CEO)
- Status: Active
- Distributor: Battery/Jive (2009–2011)
- Genre: Hip-hop, R&B
- Country of origin: United States
- Location: Atlanta, Georgia (2008–present)

In 2008, Robinson formed a new record label through Jive Records, called Swagg Team Entertainment, after a widely publicized lawsuit with Block Entertainment and Bad Boy South. Robinson spoke about the lawsuit and his relationship with Diddy in an interview in 2015.

Swagg Team Entertainment saw their debut from Chicago rap group Hotstylz, with their first single, "Lookin Boy". It also saw the debut from Dallas rap group GS Boyz; their first single was "Stanky Legg".

Current artists

- Hotstylz (Krazee, Meatball & Raydio G)
- Soufside
- Prince Charming
- Myk G Mr 16 Bars
- Kidd Starr

Former groups

- GS Boyz (Marc D, Slizz & DK)

=== Reality television ===
In 2014, Robinson joined the VH1 reality series Love & Hip Hop: Atlanta as a supporting cast member. In August 2017, it was announced that he would compete in the first season of VH1's Scared Famous, which premiered on October 23, 2017.

== Personal life ==
In December 2011, Robinson's recording studio for his label Swagg Team was robbed. The criminals took about $70,000 worth of studio equipment along with a hard drive containing Robinson's unreleased music for his third studio album. The identity of one of the robbers was later revealed by Robinson. He knew one of the robbers, named "Honcho", of Thomaston, Georgia.

As of 2022, Robinson has nine children by five women.

In January 2020, Robinson was filmed driving for a rideshare company called Pull Up N Go, leading to speculation that he had fallen on hard times financially. He later spoke out against these claims, stating that he was doing this in order to show children the value of hard work as part of his volunteering with Big Brothers Big Sisters of Metro Atlanta.

On November 7, 2021, he married Love & Hip Hop: Atlanta star Kendra Robinson.

== Legal issues ==
On May 18, 2009, it was announced that Robinson was suing his starter labels Block Entertainment & Bad Boy Entertainment due to unpaid royalties of his music. Eventually, Diddy and Robinson settled their differences. Little is known as to whether Robinson settled his differences with Block Entertainment.

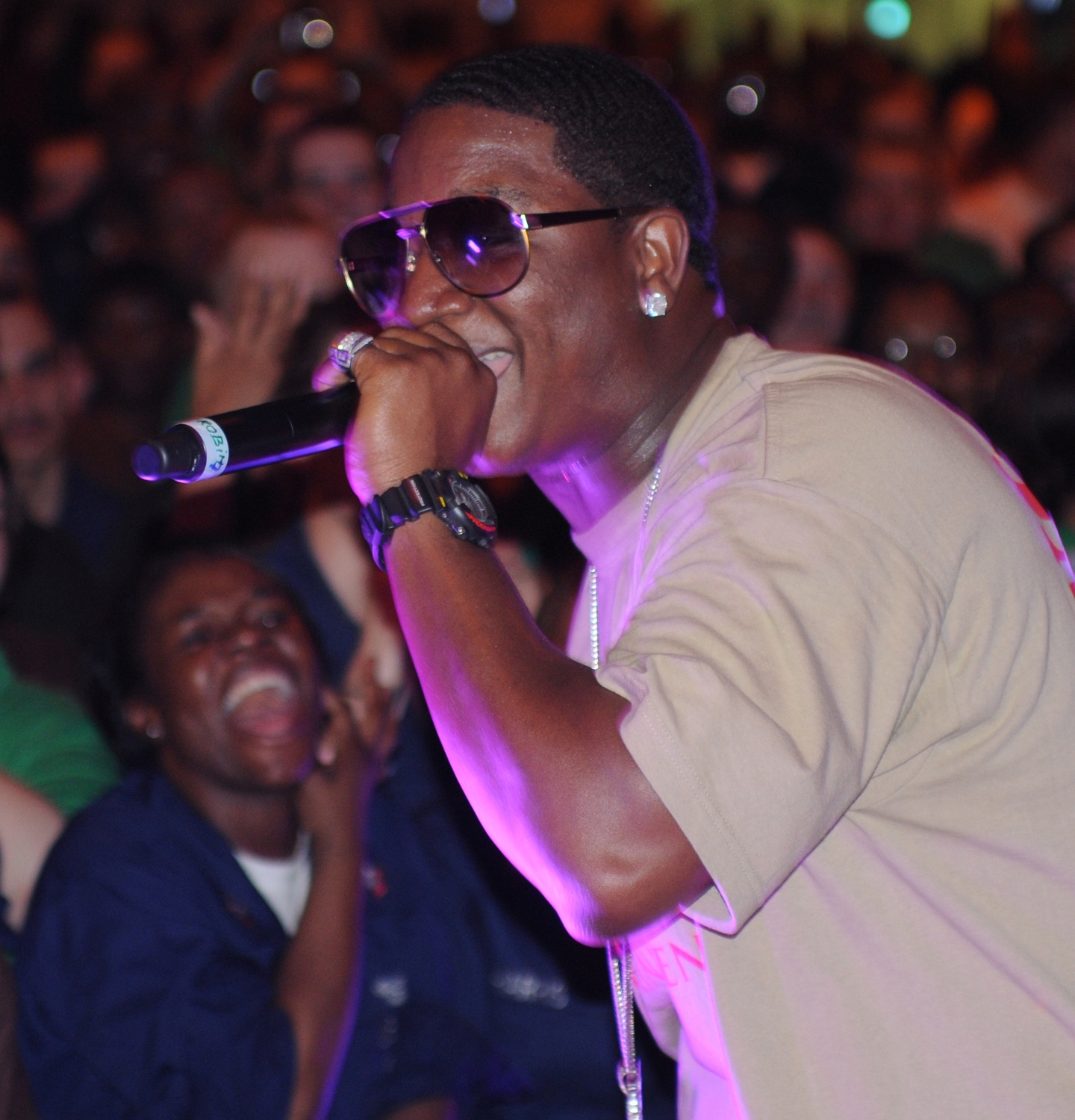
Yung Joc performing aboard the aircraft carrier USS Dwight D. Eisenhower, April 20, 2009

In 2012, Robinson (along with Block Entertainment and Bad Boy Entertainment) was sued by local Atlanta record label Master Mind Music, for breach of contract and copyright infringement.

== Discography ==
Studio albums

- New Joc City (2006)
- Hustlenomics (2007)
- Mr. Robinson's Neighborhood (2017)

== Filmography ==
Television
Year	Film	Role
2014–2026	Love & Hip Hop: Atlanta	Supporting role (seasons 3–7, 10A, 11) Main cast (seasons 8–9, 10B, 12–13)
2016–2018	Leave It to Stevie	Himself
2017	Scared Famous	Himself (contestant)
2021	Wild 'n Out	Himself (season 15, episode 25)
2022	I Got a Story to Tell	Julius (episode: "Gas Station Pill")

== Awards ==
=== BET Hip Hop Awards ===
Yung Joc has won one award for his six nominations.

- 2006: Rookie of the Year (nominated)
- 2006: Best Live Performer (nominated)
- 2006: Hip-Hop Dance of the Year (nominated)
- 2006, Hip-Hop Track of the Year: "It's Goin' Down" (won)
- 2006, Hip-Hop MVP of the Year (nominated)
- 2008, Hip-Hop Video of the Year: "Get Like Me" with David Banner & Chris Brown (nominated)

=== Billboard Music Awards ===
Yung Joc has had three nominations.

- 2006: Rap Songs Artist of the Year (nominated)
- 2006: Top Rap Artist (nominated)
- 2006: Top R&B Song: "It's Goin' Down" (nominated)

=== Grammy Awards ===
Yung Joc received his first nomination, including Best Rap Song.

- 2007: Best Rap Song: "It's Goin' Down" (nominated)

=== MTV Video Music Awards ===
Yung Joc has had three nominations.

- 2006: Best Rap Video: "It's Goin' Down" (nominated)
- 2006: MTV2 Award: "It's Goin' Dow" (nominated)
- 2007: Monster Single of the Year: "Buy U a Drank (Shawty Snappin')" (nominated)

=== Soul Train Music Awards ===
Yung Joc has had two nominations.

- 2007: Best R&B/Soul or Rap Dance Cut: "It's Goin' Down" (nominated)
- 2007: Best R&B/Soul or Rap New Artist (nominated)
