= Boyz n da Hood =

American hip-hop group

- Origin: Atlanta, Georgia, U.S.
- Genres: Hip-hop, gangsta rap
- Years active: 2003–2007
- Labels: Block; Bad Boy South; Atlantic
- Past members: Young Jeezy; Big Gee; Jody Breeze; Big Duke; Gorilla Zoe

Boyz n da Hood was an American Southern gangsta rap group from Atlanta, Georgia. They were formerly signed to Sean Combs' Bad Boy Records and consisted of Young Jeezy, Jody Breeze, Gorilla Zoe, Big Gee, and Big Duke. They have collaborated several times with fellow Atlanta artist and Block Ent labelmate Yung Joc.

== Discography ==
=== Studio albums ===
Year	Album	Peak chart positions		
Year	Album	U.S.	U.S. R&B	U.S. Rap
2005	Boyz n da Hood: Released: June 21, 2005; Label: Block, Bad Boy South, Atlantic; Format: CD, LP, digital download	5	1	1
2007	Back Up n da Chevy: Released: October 2, 2007; Label: Block, Bad Boy South, Atlantic; Format: CD, LP, digital download	51	7	2

=== Singles ===
==== As a lead artist ====
Year	Title	Peak chart positions			Album
Year	Title	US	US R&B	US Rap	Album
2004	"Dem Boyz"	56	15	13	Boyz n da Hood
2004	"Felonies"	—	—	—	Boyz n da Hood
"—" denotes releases that did not chart.
