= Block Entertainment =

- Parent company: Interscope Capitol Labels Group
- Founded: 2004
- Founder: Russell "Block" Spencer and Andrew "Gotti" Couser Jody White Jr
- Distributors: Block Entertainment; Interscope Capitol Labels Group
- Genre: Hip hop R&B
- Country of origin: US
- Location: Atlanta, Georgia
- Official website: Block Entertainment

Block Entertainment or Block Ent. Worldwide is a record label created by Russell "Block" Spencer and Andrew "Gotti" Couser. The label is known for creating southern group Boyz N Da Hood and releasing artist Yung Joc. In 2005 Block signed an exclusive joint venture deal with Warner Music Group's label Bad Boy Records. In November 2009, Block Entertainment signed a joint venture deal with Capitol Records. In 2011 the label released Gorilla Zoe's album King Kong, which features the first single "What's Going On".

== Legal issues ==
In the spring of 2013, Yung Eaz met Atlanta producer Nitti Beatz They recorded the hit "Shut Yo Mouth". After Teaming with Russell "Block" Spencer, founder of the Block Enterprises label. Spencer signed Eaz to Capitol Records for a multi-album deal, and Capitol released Eaz's debut "Shut Yo Mouth" . Following a legal action by Capitol Records against the ReDigi.com online company in April 2013, the latter was found to be in violation of copyright law. Capitol Records claimed that ReDigi was guilty of copyright infringement due to a business model that facilitated the creation of additional copies of Capitol's digital music files, whereby users could upload the files for downloading or streaming to the new purchaser of the file. ReDigi argued that the resale of MP3/digital music files is actually permitted under certain doctrines ("fair use" and "first sale") but the court maintained that the doctrines' application "was limited to material items that the copyright owner put into the stream of commerce.

== Artists ==
=== Current artists ===
- Kris Kelli
- 48 Slim
- Courtni Renei
- Lil Flo Malcom
- Reek Maikan
- Gorilla Zoe
- Lil Xan
- SleazyWorld Go
- Jacquees
- Jody Breeze

=== Former artists ===
- Boyz N Da Hood
  - Young Jeezy
  - Big Gee
  - Duke
- Rich Chiggaoc
- YC
- Yung Joc
