= Waka Flocka Flame discography =

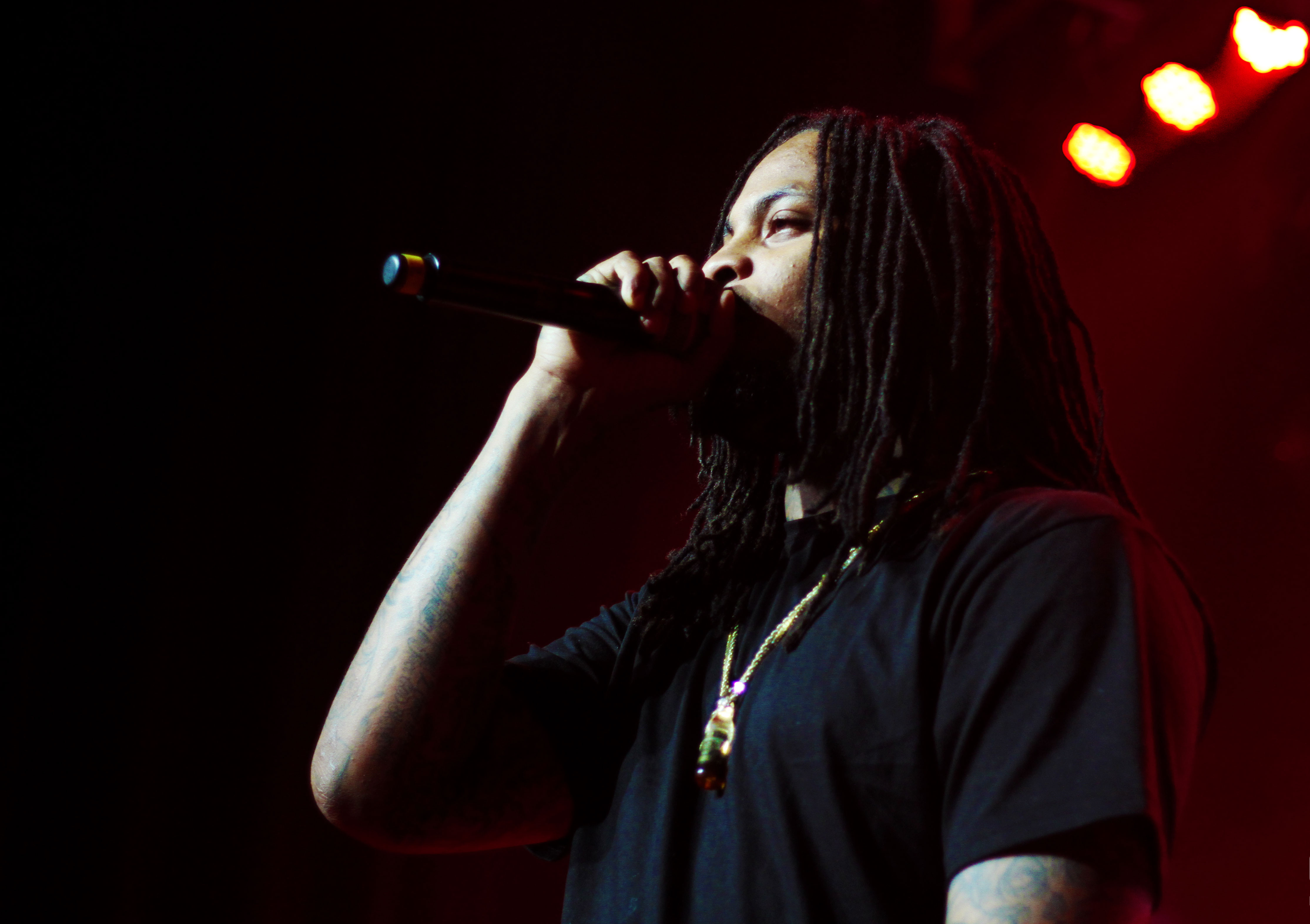
- Waka Flocka Flame performing in 2014
- Studio albums: 2
- Singles: 41
- Mixtapes: 30

The discography of Waka Flocka Flame, an American rapper, consists of two studio albums, 41 singles and 28 mixtapes. His highest-charting single, "No Hands" featuring Roscoe Dash and Wale, peaked at number 13 on the US Billboard Hot 100.

== Albums ==
=== Studio albums ===
List of studio albums, with selected chart positions and sales figures
Title	Album details	Peak chart positions			Sales
Title	Album details	US	US R&B /HH	US Rap	Sales
Flockaveli	Released: October 5, 2010; Label: 1017, Asylum, Warner Bros.; Format: CD, digital download	6	2	2	US: 375,000
Triple F Life: Friends, Fans & Family	Released: June 12, 2012; Label: 1017, BSM, Asylum, Warner Bros.; Format: CD, digital download	10	2	1	US: 100,000

=== Collaborative albums ===
List of collaborative albums, with selected chart positions
Title	Album details	Peak chart positions		
Title	Album details	US	US R&B /HH	US Rap
Ferrari Boyz (with Gucci Mane)	Released: August 9, 2011; Label: 1017, BSM, Asylum, Warner Bros.; Format: CD, digital download	21	5	4

== Mixtapes ==
Title	Mixtape details
Salute Me or Shoot Me	Released: January 14, 2009
Twin Towers (with Slim Dunkin)	Released: July 22, 2009
Salute Me or Shoot Me 2	Released: August 24, 2009
LeBron Flocka James	Released: October 17, 2009
Salute Me or Shoot Me 2.5	Released: October 22, 2009
Streets R Us (with Travis Porter)	Released: October 31, 2009
True Blood (with Jon Geezy)	Released: January 11, 2010
LeBron Flocka James 2	Released: April 14, 2010
Waka Flocka Myers	Released: November 11, 2010
Salute Me or Shoot Me 3 (Hip Hops Outcast)	Released: February 11, 2011
Benjamin Flocka: Out On Bail	Released: April 11, 2011
DuFlocka Rant (10 Toes Down)	Released: May 31, 2011
Twin Towers 2 (No Fly Zone) (with Slim Dunkin)	Released: October 21, 2011
LeBron Flocka James 3 (with Wooh da Kid & Slim Dunkin)	Released: October 22, 2011
Lock Out (with French Montana)	Released: December 13, 2011
Salute Me or Shoot Me 4 (Banned from America)	Released: September 13, 2012
DuFlocka Rant 2	Released: February 5, 2013
DuFlocka Rant: Halftime Show	Released: May 9, 2013
From Roaches to Rollies	Released: October 4, 2013
Re-Up	Released: March 21, 2014
I Can't Rap Vol. 1	Released: July 14, 2014
The Turn Up Godz Tour	Released: March 2, 2015
Salute Me or Shoot Me 5	Released: April 1, 2015
Flockaveli 1.5	Released: November 25, 2015
LeBron Flocka James 4 (with Southside)	Released: July 26, 2016
Brick House Boyz (with Zaytoven and Big Bank Black)	Released: March 23, 2018
Big Homie Flocka	Released: May 31, 2018
I Can't Rap Vol. 2	Released: December 25, 2018
Salute Me or Shoot Me 6	Released: April 18, 2019
Mollywood	Released: June 7, 2019
Salute Me or Shoot Me 7	Released: April 28, 2020
LeBron Flocka James 2K26	Released: February 13, 2026

== Singles ==
=== As lead artist ===
List of singles as lead artist, with selected chart positions and certifications, showing year released and album name
Title	Year	Peak chart positions								Certifications	Album
Title	Year	US	US R&B /HH	US Rap	US Main. R&B/HH	US Rhy.	US R&B/HH Air.	US Rap Air.	CAN	Certifications	Album
"O Let's Do It" (featuring Lil' Capp) (Note: Lil' Capp is not credited by Billboard as a featuring artist, nor is he credited on the single version of the song.)	2009	62	12	7	7	31	12	7	—		Flockaveli
"Hard in da Paint"	2010	— (Note: "Hard in da Paint" did not enter the Billboard Hot 100, but peaked at number 11 on the Bubbling Under Hot 100 Singles chart.)	28	20	22	—	28	20	—	RIAA: Gold	Flockaveli
"No Hands" (featuring Roscoe Dash and Wale)	2010	13	2	1	1	3	2	1	—	RIAA: Diamond; BPI: Silver; RMNZ: 2× Platinum	Flockaveli
"Grove St. Party" (featuring Kebo Gotti)	2011	74	12	10	8	34	12	10	—		Flockaveli
"She Be Puttin' On" (with Gucci Mane featuring Slim Dunkin)	2011	—	77	—	—	—	—	—	—		Ferrari Boyz
"Round of Applause" (featuring Drake)	2011	86	15	17	13	29	15	16	—		Triple F Life: Fans, Friends & Family
"I Don't Really Care" (featuring Trey Songz)	2012	64	25	20	16	38	25	20	—		Triple F Life: Fans, Friends & Family
"Rooster in My Rari"	2012	—	120	—	—	—	—	—	—		Triple F Life: Fans, Friends & Family
"Get Low" (featuring Nicki Minaj, Tyga and Flo Rida)	2012	72	67	25	35	20	66	22	58		Triple F Life: Fans, Friends & Family
"50K" (featuring Gucci Mane or remix featuring T.I.)	2013	—	—	—	—	—	—	—	—		Salute Me or Shoot Me 4: Banned from America and DuFlocka Rant: Halftime Show
"Slippin"	2014	—	—	—	—	—	—	—	—		Salute Me or Shoot Me 5
"Game On" (featuring Good Charlotte)	2015	—	—	—	—	—	—	—	—		Pixels soundtrack
"Workin"	2015	—	—	—	—	—	—	—	—		Flockaveli 1.5
"Was My Dawg"	2017	—	—	—	—	—	—	—	—		Non-album singles
"Big Dawg"	2017	—	—	—	—	—	—	—	—		Non-album singles
"Trap My Ass Off"	2017	—	—	—	—	—	—	—	—		Non-album singles
"Circles" (featuring Derez De'Shon)	2017	—	—	—	—	—	—	—	—		Non-album singles
"Bloggers" (with Zaytoven and Big Bank Black)	2018	—	—	—	—	—	—	—	—		The Brick House Boyz
"Vince Lombardi" (with Allblack)	2023	—	—	—	—	—	—	—	—		Slow Motion Better Than No Motion
"King Killa" (featuring Trap-A-Holics and DJ Whoo Kid)	2026	—	—	—	—	—	—	—	—		LeBron Flocka James 2K26
"Shit I Like" (featuring Trap-A-Holics and DJ Whoo Kid)	2026	—	—	—	—	—	—	—	—		LeBron Flocka James 2K26
"—" denotes a recording that did not chart or was not released in that territory.

=== As featured artist ===
List of singles as featured artist, with selected chart positions, showing year released and album name
Title	Year	Peak chart positions					Certifications	Album
Title	Year	US	US R&B /HH	US Dance	CAN	SCO	Certifications	Album
"Bingo" (Gucci Mane featuring Soulja Boy and Waka Flocka Flame)	2010	—	75	—	—	—		The State vs. Radric Davis
"Wild Boy" (MGK featuring Waka Flocka Flame)	2011	98	49	—	—	—	RIAA: 3× Platinum	Half Naked & Almost Famous
"Grillin" (Mitri Rice featuring Waka Flocka Flame)	2011	—	—	—	—	—		Non-album single
"Lehhhgooo" (N.O.R.E. featuring Busta Rhymes, Game and Waka Flocka Flame)	2012	—	—	—	—	—		S.U.P.E.R.T.H.U.G.
"Lights Down Low" (Bei Maejor featuring Waka Flocka Flame)	2012	—	68	—	—	—		Non-album single
"All You" (The Cataracs featuring Waka Flocka Flame and Kaskade)	2012	—	—	—	—	—		Gordo Taqueria
"Molly" (Baby D featuring Waka Flocka Flame)	2012	—	—	—	—	—		Non-album singles
"Want It All" (Kalyko featuring Waka Flocka Flame)	2013	—	—	—	—	—		Non-album singles
"Scream & Shout" (Hit-Boy Remix) (will.i.am featuring Britney Spears, Hit-Boy, Waka Flocka Flame, Lil Wayne and Diddy)	2013	—	49	—	—	—		#willpower
"Can I Freak" (MN Fats featuring Waka Flocka Flame)	2013	—	—	—	—	—		Non-album singles
"Power Moves" (Frenchie BSM featuring Waka Flocka Flame)	2013	—	—	—	—	—		Non-album singles
"Miley" (DJ Holiday featuring Wiz Khalifa and Waka Flocka Flame)	2013	—	—	—	—	—		Non-album singles
"Wild Out" (Borgore featuring Waka Flocka Flame and Paige)	2013	—	—	48	—	—		Wild Out EP
"Killaman" (5ive Mics featuring Zuse and Waka Flocka Flame)	2013	—	—	—	—	—		Non-album singles
"Whassap" (Roscoe Dash featuring Waka Flocka Flame)	2014	—	—	—	—	—		Non-album singles
"Always" (DJ Scream featuring Que, Waka Flocka Flame, Gunplay and Tracy T)	2014	—	—	—	—	—		Hunger Pains
"Tolerated" (Girl Talk & Freeway featuring Waka Flocka Flame)	2014	—	—	—	—	—		Broken Ankles
"Rage the Night Away" (Steve Aoki featuring Waka Flocka Flame)	2014	—	—	20	—	—		Neon Future I
"TTU (Too Turnt Up)" (Flosstradamus featuring Waka Flocka Flame)	2014	—	—	—	—	—		Non-album single
"Chickens" (P. Reign featuring Waka Flocka Flame)	2014	—	—	—	—	—		Dear America
"Broke" (The Zombie Kids featuring Waka Flocka Flame)	2014	—	—	—	—	—		Non-album single
"A-List" (Sisqo featuring Waka Flocka Flame)	2014	—	—	—	—	—		Last Dragon
"Tell Daddy" (Maejor featuring Ying Yang Twins and Waka Flocka Flame)	2014	—	—	—	—	—		Non-album singles
"Cheezin'" (Umek featuring Waka Flocka Flame)	2015	—	—	—	—	—		Non-album singles
"Hot Now" (G Baby featuring Waka Flocka Flame and J Dubb)	2015	—	—	—	—	—		Non-album singles
"Beast" (Mia Martina featuring Waka Flocka Flame)	2015	—	—	—	39	—		Mia Martina
"Gravity" (Joe Sikora featuring Waka Flocka Flame)	2015	—	—	—	—	—		Non-album singles
"Moved On" (Rayven Justice featuring Waka Flocka Flame)	2015	—	—	—	—	—		Non-album singles
"Jump Around" (KSI featuring Waka Flocka Flame)	2016	—	—	—	—	77		Jump Around
"House Party" (Stranger featuring Waka Flocka Flame)	2016	—	—	—	—	—		House Party EP
"Gold" (Dash Berlin and DBSTF featuring Jake Reese, Waka Flocka Flame and DJ Whoo Kid)	2016	—	—	—	—	—		We Are, Pt. 2
"Requiem for Peace" (Gramatik and Anomalie featuring Waka Flocka Flame and Chrishira Perrier)	2019	—	—	—	—	—		Non-album single
"—" denotes a recording that did not chart or was not released in that territory.

== Other charted songs ==
List of songs, with selected chart positions, showing year released and album name
Title	Year	Peak chart positions	Album
Title	Year	US R&B /HH	Album
"Rollin" (Gunplay featuring Waka Flocka Flame)	2011	98	Inglorious Bastard
"Mobbin'" (Maino featuring Waka Flocka Flame)	2012	—	Non-album song
"Hood Rich Anthem" (DJ Scream featuring 2 Chainz, Future, Waka Flocka Flame, Yo Gotti and Gucci Mane)	2012	96	Long Live the Hustle

== Guest appearances ==
List of non-single guest appearances, with other performing artists, showing year released and album name
Title	Year	Other artist(s)	Album
"Same Shit" (Remix)	2009	Slim Dunkin, OJ Da Juiceman	Built for Interrogation
"80's Baby"	2009	Slim Dunkin, D-Bo, Dae Dae	Built for Interrogation
"I Love"	2009	Slim Dunkin, B.Geezy	Built for Interrogation
"I Got It"	2009	Slim Dunkin, Lil Cap, B.Geezy	Built for Interrogation
"Lord I'm Tired"	2009	Frenchie	Chicken Room
"What You Reppin'"	2009	Frenchie, Gucci Mane, Wooh Da Kid, Slim Dunkin	Chicken Room
"Brand New"	2009	Frenchie, Gucci Mane	Chicken Room
"Wasted" (Remix)	2009	Gucci Mane	Lebron Flocka James
"Bingo"	2009	Gucci Mane, Soulja Boy	The State vs. Radric Davis
"Coca Cola"	2010	Gucci Mane, Rocko, OJ Da Juiceman, Shawty Lo, Yo Gotti, Nicki Minaj	Burrrprint (2) HD
"Shining For No Apparent Reason"	2010	Gucci Mane, Schife, Wooh Da Kid	Burrrprint (2) HD
"Flex" (Remix)	2010	Party Boyz, T-Pain	The Re-Up 11
"I'm Just Chillin"	2010	Ocoop, Jim Jones	none
"Stove Music"	2010	Gucci Mane, Yo Gotti	Mr. Zone 6
"You Know What It Is"	2010	Gucci Mane	Mr. Zone 6
"Throw It Up Pt. 2"	2010	Lil Jon, Pastor Troy	Crunk Rock
"Young Thad"	2010	Young Thad	none
"Lock My CEO"	2010	Gudda Gudda	Back 2 Guddaville
"Grind"	2010	J-Bar	Grind Star
"All Dem Boys"	2010	Jasmyn, Roscoe Dash	none
"Hands Up, Lay Down"	2010	Twista	The Perfect Storm
"Get 'Em"	2010	Game	Brake Lights
"So Crazy" (Remix)	2010	Fred the Godson, Cam'ron	Armageddon
"Pattycake"	2010	Gucci Mane	none
"Do Ya Dance" (Remix)	2010	Qu1k, OJ Da Juiceman	none
Illusion"	2010	La Chat	Krumbz 2 Brickz
"2 Da Flo"	2010	La Chat	Krumbz 2 Brickz
"Blow Your Ass Off"	2011	Yo Gotti, Zed Zilla, Starlito	Cocaine Musik 5: White Friday
"Den't Be Mad at Me" (Remix)	2011	Frenchie, Haitian Fresh, Murdah Baby	New Atlanta
"I Don't Care" (Remix)	2011	Josh Xantus, Ace Hood	none
"Puttin' In Work"	2011	YG Hootie	Fonk Love: Flight to Da Motherland
"Everything Bricksquad"	2011	YG Hootie, Wooh Da Kid, Frenchie	Fonk Love: Flight to Da Motherland
"This Is What I Do"	2011	Gucci Mane, OJ Da Juiceman	The Return of Mr. Zone 6
"Pancakes"	2011	Gucci Mane, 8Ball	The Return of Mr. Zone 6
"Trick or Treat"	2011	Gucci Mane, Slim Dunkin, Wooh Da Kid	The Return of Mr. Zone 6
"I'm Thuggin"	2011	DJ Khaled, Ace Hood	We the Best Forever
"Welcome To My Hood" (Remix)	2011	DJ Khaled, Ludacris, T-Pain, Busta Rhymes, Twista, Mavado, Ace Hood, Fat Joe, Game, Jadakiss, Bun B	We the Best Forever
"Annoying"	2011	Young Scooter, Future	Fitnessin' & Flexin'
"Wild Boy"	2011	MGK	Half Naked & Almost Famous
"Pump Fake"	2011	Paper Boy, Boss Kane, Playmaker	Paper Route
"White Sheets"	2011	Tony Yayo, Yo Gotti	Meyer Lansky
"My Benz"	2011	Wooh Da Kid, Ice Burgandy, P Smurf	Krown The King
"All I Ever Wanted"	2011	Wooh Da Kid, Slim Dunkin	Krown The King
"Put Your Hands Up"	2011	Wooh Da Kid, Slim Dunkin	Krown The King
"Go Hard"	2011	Yung Joey	The 6th Man
"Bullshit"	2011	Yung Joey	The 6th Man
"Banned from the Club"	2011	Yung Joey, Slim Dunkin	The 6th Man
"9 AM"	2011	Yung Joey, Wooh Da Kid	The 6th Man
"They Scared"	2012	Prodigy, Havoc	H.N.I.C. 3: The Mixtape
"For My Niggaz"	2012	P Smurf, Eldorado Red	Big Ol Pimp Talk
"All That Ass"	2012	Ja-Bar	#TOKE Vol. 1
"Bad Bitch"	2012	Red Café, French Montana	Hells Kitchen
"Do It"	2012	Veli Sosa	Mr.500
"Walking Lick"	2012	Gucci Mane	Trap Back
"Drop It On Me"	2012	Kali Kash	none
"Money Made Her"	2012	Wooh Da Kid, Slug Mania	Strap-A-Holics 2.0: Reloaded
"Bricksquad Diva"	2012	Wooh Da Kid, Slim Dunkin, Gucci Mane	Strap-A-Holics 2.0: Reloaded
"Ya Boy"	2012	Wooh Da Kid, Bo Deal	Strap-A-Holics 2.0: Reloaded
"Death Around the Corner"	2012	Ice Burgandy, Wooh Da Kid	Progress Involves Risk Unfortunately
"Back To The Money"	2012	Jadakiss, Slim Dunkin, French Montana	Consignment
"Gun Clappin Reloaded"	2012	Bo Deal, Red Zilla	The Chicago Code 3: Revelations
"Murda"	2012	Bo Deal, Chief Keef	The Chicago Code 3: Revelations
"Wow" (Remix)	2012	Bo Deal, Twista, French Montana, Trae tha Truth	The Chicago Code 3: Revelations
"Loyal"	2012	Richie Wess, Gucci Mane	J.O.B. (Joint Ova Blunts)
"Coppin'"	2012	Jarvis	Heartache
"Real Niggas Stay Fly"	2012	Yung Joey, Fly-Ty, Fred the Godson	Along Came Molly
"Mr. Fix It"	2012	Yung Joey, Tavoria	Along Came Molly
"I Got Em"	2012	Trae tha Truth	Tha Blackprint
"Don't Be Mad"	2012	Ransom, Murdah Baby	Winter’s Coming
"Spazz Out"	2012	Chill Will	Real Shit
"I’ma Hata"	2012	DJ Drama, Tyler, The Creator, D-Bo	Quality Street Music
"Crazy"	2012	Gucci Mane	Trap God
"Baby Wipes"	2012	Gucci Mane	Trap God
"Rolly Up"	2012	Gucci Mane, Young Scooter	Trap God
"Fuck Something"	2012	Gucci Mane, Kirko Bangz, Young Scooter	Trap God
"Suited Booted"	2012	Frenchie, Ice Burgandy	Concrete Jungle 2
"Fuck Da Police"	2012	Ice Burgandy	Rhythm & Burgandy
"Love Me Hate Me "	2012	Ice Burgandy, French Montana	Rhythm & Burgandy
"Red On"	2012	Bloody Jay, S.O.N.Y.	Blatlanta (Bigger Than Rap)
"Champion"	2012	Trav	Push
"Dog Pound"	2012	Mac Miller	none
"Pretty Flacko" (Remix)	2012	ASAP Rocky, Gucci Mane, Pharrell	Long. Live. ASAP
"Numbers"	2012	Young Chris	The Introduction Tape
"Can I Freak"	2013	MN Fats	none
"Good Girl Bad Bitch"	2013	D-Dash	Mill B4 Dinner Time
"Breakfast"	2013	Gucci Mane, PeeWee Longway	Trap God 2
"The Man"	2013	Chaz Gotti	Voice of Dunk
"Ain't Right"	2013	Chaz Gotti, D Dash	Voice of Dunk
"Backseat"	2013	Gucci Mane, Chief Keef	none
"Remix Rerock"	2013	Gucci Mane, Young Scooter	Free Bricks 2
"We Don't Fuck Wit That"	2013	Kazzie	none
"King Pin"	2013	Gucci Mane, PeeWee Longway, Young Dolph	Money, Pounds, Ammunition
"No Lackin"	2013	Funkmaster Flex, Lil Reese, Wale	Who You Mad At? Me or Yourself?
"Rich Gang"	2013	Funkmaster Flex	Who You Mad At? Me or Yourself?
"Trap N Roll"	2013	Wyclef Jean, Angelica Salem	April Showers
"Dead Man"	2013	SBOE, One Shot	All We Got Is Us
"They Gon’ Hate Us Anyway"	2013	Maino, The Mafia	none
"Long Over Due"	2013	Frenchie	Long Overdue
"MWZC"	2013	DJ Scream, Gucci Mane, Project Pat	The Ratchet Superior
"Vanity"	2013	360	Beginning of Forever
"Work"	2013	A-Wax, Cashis	Jesus Malverde
"New York City"	2013	Uncle Murda, Vado	none
"G Rind" (Remix)	2013	Papoose, Gunplay	none
"Murda Something"	2013	ASAP Ferg	Trap Lord
"Embalming Fluid"	2013	Gucci Mane	World War 3: Gas
"Geekin"	2013	Gucci Mane	World War 3: Gas
"Picture That"	2013	Gucci Mane	World War 3: Gas
"What You Mean"	2013	Gucci Mane	World War 3: Gas
"Don't Trust"	2013	Gucci Mane, Young Scooter	World War 3: Lean
"Miley"	2013	DJ Holiday, Wiz Khalifa	none
"Nights Like This"	2013	Gucci Mane	Diary of a Trap God
"Choppers"	2013	Gucci Mane, OG Boo Dirty, Young Dolph, Young Scooter	Diary of a Trap God
"Trap Rap"	2013	Hardo	Pistolvania George
"Havana"	2013	Peter Jackson, Bianca	Good Company
"Tolerated"	2014	Girl Talk, Freeway	Broken Ankles EP
"Slide Thru" (Remix)	2014	Rayven Justice	I Have a Dream
"Can't Trust Thots" (Remix)	2015	Wash	none
"It G Ma" (Remix)	2015	Keith Ape, A$AP Ferg, Father, Dumbfoundead	none
"Nightlife"	2015	Jack-P	none
"Apeshit"	2015	Prof	Liability
"UFC (Tap-Out)"	2015	Busta Rhymes, Gucci Mane	The Return of the Dragon (The Abstract Went On Vacation)
"Chips"	2017	Talib Kweli	Radio Silence
"2 Sides of the Game"	2018	Lecrae, Zaytoven, K-So	Let the Trap Say Amen
"Elbows"	2018	B.o.B, Amara La Negra	NAGA
"Break Your Back"	2018	Purari	Ones To Watch - Eagle EP
"Where I'm From"	2019	Rayven Justice	ESO
"Clap"	2025	Metro Boomin, DJ Spinz	A Futuristic Summa
"Drip BBQ"	2025	Metro Boomin, J Money, Quavo	A Futuristic Summa
"I Like That"	2025	Metro Boomin, 2 Chainz, Roscoe Dash, DJ Spinz	A Futuristic Summa
"Partying & Drinking"	2025	Metro Boomin, Roscoe Dash, 21 Savage, Future	A Futuristic Summa
"I Need (Where U From)"	2025	Metro Boomin Yung L.A., J Money, Lil Baby, Roscoe Dash, 2 Chainz, Skooly	A Futuristic Summa

== Music videos ==
List of music videos, with directors, showing year released
Title	Year	Director(s)
"O Let's Do It"	2010	G. Visuals
"O Let's Do It" (Remix) (featuring Diddy and Rick Ross)	2010	Spiff TV
"Hard In Da Paint"	2010	Benny Boom
"No Hands" (featuring Roscoe Dash and Wale)	2010	Motion Family
"For My Dawgs"	2010	Derek Pike
"Bustin' At Em"	2010	Morocco Vaughn
"Snake In the Grass" (featuring Cartier Kitten)	2010	Morocco Vaughn
"Grove St. Party" (featuring Kebo Gotti)	2011	Morocco Vaughn
"Round of Applause" (featuring Drake)	2012	Mr. Boomtown
"Foreign Shit"	2012	Julien Gonthier, Raphael Stora, Joachim Maquet
"I Don't Really Care" (featuring Trey Songz)	2012	TAJ
"Rooster In My Rari"	2012	Morocco Vaughn
"Let Dem Guns Blam" (featuring Meek Mill)	2012	Jeff "Echo" Reyes
"Candy Paint & Gold Teeth" (featuring Ludacris and Bun B)	2012	Mr. Boomtown
"Fist Pump" (featuring B.o.B)	2012	Blind Folks
"Get Low" (featuring Nicki Minaj, Tyga and Flo Rida)	2012	Benny Boom
"50K" (Remix) (featuring T.I.)	2013	Cricket
