= Sorry 4 the Wait =

Mixtape by Lil Wayne
- Released: July 13, 2011; January 14, 2022 (Streaming re-release)
- Genre: Hip-hop
- Length: 41:07; 53:17 (Streaming re-release)
- Labels: Young Money; Cash Money
- Producers: 40; Adeptus; Alex Lustig; Bleu; DamnThatsTight; DJ Two Stacks; Happy Perez; Lex Luger; Lil' Lody; Marz; Mike Will Made It; Mr. Hanky; Mr. Incredible; No I.D.; Paul Epworth; Pi'erre Bourne; Sonny Digital; Student; Switch; T@; Tay Keith; The-Dream

Lil Wayne chronology
I Am Not a Human Being (2010)	Sorry 4 the Wait (2011)	Tha Carter IV (2011)

Singles from Sorry 4 the Wait
- 1. "Tunechi's Back" Released: July 8, 2011

Professional ratings
Aggregate scores
Source	Rating
Metacritic	65/100
Review scores
Source	Rating
AllMusic	3.5/5 stars
Consequence of Sound	3.5/5 stars
Now	3.5/5 stars
Pitchfork	7.1/10
Rolling Stone	4/5 stars
XXL	4/5 stars

Sorry 4 the Wait is the tenth mixtape by American rapper Lil Wayne, named as an attempt to apologize for the continued delay of his ninth album, Tha Carter IV. Wayne said the mixtape would have about ten songs and be similar to No Ceilings, with him using other artists' tracks and making a cover track. It was released for digital download on July 13, 2011, and received generally positive reviews from music critics.

The sequel to the mixtape, Sorry 4 the Wait 2, was released on January 20, 2015, as a response to the long delay of Wayne's album Tha Carter V and disagreements with his Cash Money label.

On January 14, 2022, nearly 11 years after its initial release, the mixtape was re-released on streaming platforms. All 12 songs from the original release were cleared and included, in addition to 4 newly recorded songs.

== Background ==
Cortez Bryant delayed Tha Carter IV back until August 29, hence worrying Wayne about his fans' patience. The mixtape was worked on secretly until Young Money president Mack Maine tweeted "BREAKING NEWS!!! Lil Wayne mixtape “SORRY 4 THE WAIT” coming soon!!!!! #C4boom". Rappers Lil B and Gudda Gudda were featured on the mixtape. "Tunechi's Back" was the first track released off the mixtape on July 8. It samples "Tupac Back" by Meek Mill featuring Rick Ross. The official mixtape, containing a total of 12 tracks, was released later that month on July 13.

On November 12, 2021, Mack Maine announced plans to release an older Lil Wayne mixtape on streaming platforms in an interview with Billboard magazine. While not revealing the name of the mixtape, Maine did mention a possible January 2022 release date. Additionally, unlike Wayne's previous streaming re-release (the summer 2020 re-release of No Ceilings), every song on the yet-to-be-revealed mixtape was able to be cleared and included on all digital platforms.

On January 10, 2022, Lil Wayne announced he would be releasing Sorry 4 The Wait on streaming platforms "soon" through a post on his Instagram. While not giving an exact release date, Wayne did give fans the option to pre-save the mixtape on Apple Music and Spotify.

Less than a week after his Instagram announcement, Lil Wayne released Sorry 4 The Wait on streaming platforms on January 14, 2022. Included on the mixtape are 4 newly recorded songs, listed at the beginning of the tracklist. Some songs also had their name changed in order to avoid sample-clearance issues, such as "Sure Thing" being renamed "Twist Made Me".

== Track listing ==
Original edition (2011)
No.	Title	Original instrumental	Length
1.	"Tunechi's Back"	"Tupac Back" (Meek Mill featuring Rick Ross)	2:23
2.	"Rollin'"	"Rollin'" (Gunplay featuring Waka Flocka Flame)	2:57
3.	"Throwed Off" (featuring Gudda Gudda)	"Throwed Off" (Prince Rick & Treal Lee)	2:58
4.	"Gucci Gucci"	"Gucci Gucci" (Kreayshawn)	3:10
5.	"Tunechi's Room"	"Marvins Room" (Drake)	3:31
6.	"Sure Thing"	"Sure Thing" (Miguel)	2:28
7.	"Grove St. Party" (featuring Lil B)	"Grove St. Party" (Waka Flocka Flame featuring Kebo Gotti)	4:14
8.	"Racks"	"Racks" (YC featuring Future)	2:27
9.	"Hands Up (My Last)"	"My Last" (Big Sean featuring Chris Brown)	4:00
10.	"Sorry 4 the Wait"	"Rolling in the Deep" (Adele)	2:36
11.	"Inkredible (Remix)" (featuring Thugga, Raw Dizzy, Flow, and T@)	"Inkredible (Remix)" (Trae Tha Truth featuring Rick Ross and Jadakiss)	5:02
12.	"Run the World (Girls)"	"Run the World (Girls)" (Beyoncé)	5:21

Streaming edition (2022)
No.	Title	Original instrumental	Length
1.	"Cameras" (featuring Allan Cubas)	Original instrumental by Pi'erre Bourne	2:25
2.	"Lil Romeo"	Original instrumental by T@ & DamnThatsTight	3:15
3.	"Anti-Hero" (featuring Lil Tecca)	Original instrumental by Tay Keith & Alex Lustig	3:12
4.	"Bleu Snappin'"	Original instrumental by Yung Bleu	3:18
5.	"Tunechi's Back"	"Tupac Back" (Meek Mill featuring Rick Ross)	2:23
6.	"Tunechi Rollin'"	"Rollin'" (Gunplay featuring Waka Flocka Flame)	2:57
7.	"Throwed" (featuring Gudda Gudda)	"Throwed Off" (Prince Rick & Treal Lee)	2:58
8.	"One Big Room"	"Gucci Gucci" (Kreayshawn)	3:10
9.	"Tunechi's Room"	"Marvins Room" (Drake)	3:31
10.	"Twist Made Me"	"Sure Thing" (Miguel)	2:28
11.	"Grove Party" (featuring Lil B)	"Grove St. Party" (Waka Flocka Flame featuring Kebo Gotti)	4:14
12.	"Rax"	"Racks" (YC featuring Future)	2:27
13.	"Hands Up (My Last)"	"My Last" (Big Sean featuring Chris Brown)	4:00
14.	"Sorry 4 the Wait"	"Rolling in the Deep" (Adele)	2:36
15.	"YM Inkredible" (featuring Thugga, Raw Dizzy, Flow, and T@)	"Inkredible (Remix)" (Trae Tha Truth featuring Rick Ross and Jadakiss)	5:02
16.	"IDK"	"Run the World (Girls)" (Beyoncé)	5:21

== Charts ==
Chart performance for Sorry 4 the Wait
Chart (2022)	Peak position
US Billboard 200	60
US Top R&B/Hip-Hop Albums (Billboard)	31
