= Twin Towers 2 (No Fly Zone) =

Mixtape by Waka Flocka Flame and Slim Dunkin
- Released: October 21, 2011
- Recorded: 2011
- Genre: Atlanta hip-hop, crunk, gangsta rap, hardcore hip-hop
- Label: 1017 Brick Squad Records, Brick Squad Monopoly, Warner Bros.
- Producer: Lex Luger, SouthSide, Drumma Boy, Mike WiLL Made It

Waka Flocka Flame and Slim Dunkin chronology
Ferrari Boyz (2011)	Twin Towers 2 (No Fly Zone) (2011)	LeBron Flocka James 3 (2011)

Twin Towers 2 (No Fly Zone) is a collaborative mixtape by American rappers Waka Flocka Flame and Slim Dunkin. It was released on October 21, 2011, by 1017 Brick Squad Records, Brick Squad Monopoly and Warner Bros. Records. The album features guest appearances from Gucci Mane, Rocko, French Montana, YG, Quez, Wooh da Kid, Kebo Gotti and YG Hootie. It serves as the final project with Slim Dunkin before his death. The album was mastered by KY Engineering. The album has been downloaded over 50,000 times and became a certified silver by DatPiff.

== Other songs ==
A music video was released for "Blindside", making a cameo appearance was Slim Dunkin's 8-year-old son.

== Track listing ==
1. "Intro"
2. "Koolin' It" (featuring YG Hootie and Kebo Gotti) (prod. Lex Luger)
3. "Wrong One Ta Try" (featuring French Montana) (prod. Lex Luger)
4. "Atlanta Girl" (featuring Quez) (prod. DJ Spinz)
5. "Lightz On" (featuring Gucci Mane) (prod. Lex Luger)
6. "BMW" (featuring D-Bo) (prod. Southside)
7. "Let Me See You Do It" (featuring Wooh da Kid) (prod. Southside)
8. "Blindside" (prod. Southside)
9. "Band Pop" (prod. Southside)
10. "Flex" (featuring D-Bo and Capp) (prod. Southside)
11. "Hi-Jackin' Planez"
12. "Drop It Girl" (featuring Capp, P Ceeze and Gates) (prod. Southside)
13. "Fresh As F*ck" (featuring Gucci Mane and Rocko) (prod. Drumma Boy)
14. "Banned from the Club" (featuring Yung Joey)
15. "R.I.P." (featuring Alley Boy and Trouble) (prod. Southside)
16. "Baddest in the Room" (prod. Mike WiLL Made It)
17. "No Pressure " (featuring Rich Kidz)
18. "Hundreds" (featuring YC and Jody Breeze)
19. "Double Up Freestyle" (featuring Benzo and Dame)
