= Triple F Life: Friends, Fans & Family =

Studio album by Waka Flocka Flame
- Released: June 12, 2012
- Recorded: 2011–12
- Genre: Hip hop
- Length: 58:09
- Labels: Brick Squad Monopoly; Warner Bros.
- Producers: Waka Flocka Flame (exec.); Finis "KY Engineering" White (exec.); Debra Antney (exec.); Kevin "Coach K" Lee (exec.); Orlando McGhee (exec.); Kevin Black (exec.); Southside; Lex Luger; TM88; B.o.B; Arkatech Beatz; Troy Taylor; Skyy Stylez; Jon Redwine

Waka Flocka Flame chronology
Ferrari Boyz (2011)	Triple F Life: Friends, Fans & Family (2012)

Singles from Triple F Life: Friends, Fans & Family
- 1. "Round of Applause" Released: October 14, 2011; 2. "I Don't Really Care" Released: March 20, 2012; 3. "Get Low" Released: June 5, 2012

Triple F Life: Friends, Fans & Family is the second studio album by American rapper Waka Flocka Flame. It was released on June 12, 2012, by Brick Squad Monopoly and Warner Bros. Records. The album features guest appearances from Drake, Nicki Minaj, B.o.B, Trey Songz, Ludacris, Travis Porter and Meek Mill, while the production was handled by Waka Flocka's longtime collaborator Lex Luger, Troy Taylor, TM88 and Southside, among others.

== Background ==
The album follows the release of Waka Flocka Flame's debut studio album, Flockaveli, which was released in 2010 to largely positive reviews and contained the US top-15 single "No Hands", which was certified diamond by the Recording Industry Association of America (RIAA). Following the success of Flockaveli, Waka Flocka Flame became the flagship artist of his record label, 1017 Bricksquad – a position also owing to label boss Gucci Mane, becoming involved in many controversies and serving several prison sentences. In 2011, using his increased influence, Waka Flocka Flame expanded the 1017 Bricksquad roster, signing several new rappers to the label including YG Hootie and Kebo Gotti. Waka Flocka Flame also released a collaboration album with Gucci Mane, titled Ferrari Boyz, which charted at number 23 on the US Billboard 200, although the album was criticized by some music critics, who felt the two rappers' vastly contrasting lyrical styles clashed too much.

In January 2011, in an interview with radio presenter Bootleg Kev, Waka Flocka Flame revealed the album's title to be Triple F Life: Fans, Friends and Family. He elaborated on the title's significance during his interview with XXL, stating that his own fans, friends and family had been the main inspirations towards recording his music since he began rapping. The album took between one-and-a-half to two months to record, and was originally meant to be released during 2011, however, Waka Flocka Flame delayed the album's release to 2012 as he felt it was rushed, revealing in an interview with Billboard magazine column "The Juice" that he "felt like I was trying to please the label and not the people that really listen to the music." He spent the time between the release of Flockaveli and Triple F Life: Fans, Friends and Family identifying the unique aspects of his music and working to improve them, especially the ones that appealed to his fans.

The death of Waka Flocka Flame's close friend and fellow 1017 Brick Squad member Slim Dunkin also delayed the album's release date, as he was too emotionally affected by the death to record any new material at the time. Waka Flocka Flame would later dedicate Triple F Life: Fans, Friends and Family to Dunkin, citing him as having had a special talent.

== Singles ==
"Round of Applause", a collaboration with fellow rapper Drake, was released as the album's lead single on October 14, 2011, as a digital download: it was later released to American urban contemporary radio on November 1, 2011. The song, produced by record producer Lex Luger, was not originally meant to feature Drake: however, after he released the version of the song with his vocals added through his blog, October's Very Own, on September 10, 2011, his version was released as the single. "Round of Applause" peaked at number 86 on the US Billboard Hot 100, number 15 on the US Hot R&B/Hip-Hop Songs chart and number 16 on the US Hot Rap Songs chart. On February 26, 2012, the music video was released for "Round of Applause" featuring Drake.

The album's second single, "I Don't Really Care", was sent to urban radio on March 20, 2012, and was released for digital download in the United States on March 23, 2012. The song features guest vocals from American singer and rapper Trey Songz, and is produced by Troy Taylor and Skyy Stylez. "I Don't Really Care" debuted and peaked at number 64 on the Billboard Hot 100 for the chart week dating April 14, 2012: it also peaked at number 33 on the Hot R&B/Hip-Hop Songs chart and at number 21 on the Hot Rap Songs chart. On May 1, 2012, the music video was released for "I Don't Really Care" featuring Trey Songz.

The album's third single, "Get Low", which features fellow rappers Nicki Minaj, Tyga and Flo Rida, was released for digital download on June 5, 2012. "Rooster in My Rari" was released a promotional single to digital retailers on May 18, 2012. On August 31, 2012, the music video was released for "Get Low" featuring Flo Rida, Nicki Minaj and Tyga.

On June 11, 2012, the music video was released for "Rooster In My Rari". On June 12, 2012, the music video was released for "Let Dem Guns Blam" featuring Meek Mill. On June 13, 2012, the music video was released for "Candy Paint & Gold Teeth" featuring Bun B and Ludacris. On July 30, 2012, the music video was released for "Fist Pump" featuring B.o.B.

== Critical reception ==
Professional ratings
Aggregate scores
Source	Rating
AnyDecentMusic?	5.7/10
Metacritic	66/100
Review scores
Source	Rating
AllMusic	3.5/5 stars
AllHipHop	7/10
The A.V. Club	C+
Entertainment Weekly	B−
HipHopDX	2.5/5 stars
Pitchfork	7.0/10
Rolling Stone	3/5 stars
RapReviews	5.5/10
Spin	6/10
XXL	(XL)

Triple F Life: Friends, Fans & Family received generally positive reviews from music critics. At Metacritic, which assigns a normalized rating out of 100 to reviews from mainstream critics, the album received an average score of 66, based on 14 reviews, which indicates "generally favorable reviews". David Jeffries of AllMusic gave the album three and a half stars out of five, saying "His sophomore effort, Triple F Life, threatens to confuse the issue with its subtitle dedication to "Friends, Fans & Family," but there's way too much strip-club music here to consider this a heartwarming concept album, so spend a solemn moment with the RIP dedication to Slim Dunkin—Waka's friend and cohort who was murdered in late 2011—and then get ready for the expected slam session." Evan Rytlewski of The A.V. Club gave the album a C+, saying "What Triple F Life lacks in inspiration, it can sometimes compensate for with sheer sweat, and particularly during its many strip-club salvos, Flocka’s shouted enthusiasm and manic ad-libs keep the record animated."

Ian Cohen of Pitchfork gave the album a 7.0 out of 10, saying "It's tough to imagine Waka repeating Flockaveli and somehow improving on it, but under the cloak of Triple F's blatant crossover appeals, he slyly exceeds expectations by making a record better than it really needs to be." Andres Vasquez of HipHopDX gave the album two and half stars out of five, saying "While there are some highlights on the album, they don’t nearly make up for the glaring flaws throughout, the lack of noteworthy lyrics or the redundancy in topics, flows, hooks and beats." Ralph Bristout of XXL gave the album an XL, saying "Some will say Triple F Life finds Waka trying to do much, reaching too far out of his zone. But the rapper coolly exceeds expectations in his artistic self-awareness and this go-round shines like his diamond-studded Fozzy Bear chain." Kyle Anderson of Entertainment Weekly gave the album a B−, saying "Several tracks in, his second disc begins to bow under the weight of its own aggro intensity. That leaves his own bevy of A-list guests — including Nicki Minaj, Drake, and an especially elastic Ludacris — to bring some fresh jujitsu to Waka's flailing fight game, and provide occasional respite from Triple F Life's single-minded mania."

== Commercial performance ==
The album debuted at number 10 on the Billboard 200, with first-week sales of 33,000 copies in the United States. The album debuted at number 49 on the Canadian Albums Chart.

== Track listing ==
No.	Title	Writer(s)	Producer(s)	Length
1.	"Triple F Life (Intro)"	Juaquin Malphurs; Joshua Luellen	Southside	1:39
2.	"Let Dem Guns Blam" (featuring Meek Mill)	Malphurs; Luellen; Robert Williams	Southside	4:23
3.	"Round of Applause" (featuring Drake)	Malphurs; Lexus Lewis; Aubrey Graham	Lex Luger	4:25
4.	"I Don't Really Care" (featuring Trey Songz)	Malphurs; Aaron Smith; Troy Taylor; Tremaine Neverson	Skyy Stylez; Taylor	3:55
5.	"Rooster in My Rari"	Malphurs; Gary Hill	DJ Spinz	2:49
6.	"Get Low" (featuring Nicki Minaj, Tyga and Flo Rida)	Malphurs; Harvey Miller; Breyan Issac; Matthew Samuels; Onika Maraj; Michael Stevenson; Tramar Dillard	DJ Speedy; Boi-1da; Issac; (co.)	4:16
7.	"Fist Pump" (featuring B.o.B)	Malphurs; Stephen Hill; Luellen; Jamieson Jones; Bobby Simmons, Jr.	Southside; B.o.B; Jones; (co.)	3:48
8.	"Candy Paint & Gold Teeth" (featuring Bun B and Ludacris)	Malphurs; Carlton Mays, Jr.; Bernard Freeman; Christopher Bridges; Jon Redwine	Honorable C.N.O.T.E.; Redwine; (co.)	4:37
9.	"Cash" (featuring Wooh da Kid)	Malphurs; Luellen; Nyquan Malphurs	Southside	3:18
10.	"Lurkin'" (featuring Plies)	Malphurs; Bryan Simmons; Algernod Washington	TM88	4:42
11.	"Clap"	Malphurs; Luellen	Southside	3:39
12.	"U Ain't Bout That Life" (featuring Slim Thug and Alley Boy)	Malphurs; Luellen; Stayve Thomas; Curt Freeman	Southside	4:39
13.	"Power of My Pen"	Malphurs; Michael Dewar; Collin Dewar; Sean Baker	Arkatech Beatz	3:58
14.	"Flex" (featuring Travis Porter, Slim Dunkin and D-Bo)	Malphurs; Luellen; Mario Hamilton; Derez Lenard; Lakeem Matox; Donquez Woods; Harold Duncan	Southside	3:39
15.	"Triple F Life (Outro)" (featuring Wooh da Kid)	J. Malphurs; Miller; N. Malphurs	DJ Speedy	4:34

Deluxe edition (bonus tracks)
No.	Title	Writer(s)	Producer(s)	Length
16.	"Inky" (featuring Slim Dunkin and Wooh da Kid)	J. Malphurs; Luellen; Hamilton; N. Malphurs	Southside	4:43
17.	"Chin Up" (featuring Slim Dunkin)	J. Malphurs; Hamilton; Miller	DJ Speedy	3:01
18.	"Everything I Love" (featuring Future and Trouble)	Malphurs; Luellen; Sonny Uweazuoke; Nayvadius Willburn; Mariel Orr	Sonny Digital; Southside	4:24
19.	"Barry Bonds" (featuring ASAP and P Smurf)	Malphurs; Mays, Jr.	Honorable C.N.O.T.E.	3:52

== Charts ==
=== Weekly charts ===
Chart (2012)	Peak position
Canadian Albums Chart	49
US Billboard 200	10
US Digital Albums (Billboard)	8
US Top R&B/Hip-Hop Albums (Billboard)	2
US Top Rap Albums (Billboard)	1

=== Year-end charts ===
Chart (2012)	Position
US Top R&B/Hip-Hop Albums (Billboard)	60
