= Grove St. Party =

Single by Waka Flocka Flame featuring Kebo Gotti

from the album Flockaveli
- Released: February 15, 2011
- Recorded: 2009
- Genre: Southern hip hop
- Length: 4:10
- Label: 1017 Brick Squad; Asylum; Warner Bros.
- Songwriters: Juaquin Malphurs; Lexus Lewis
- Producer: Lex Luger

Waka Flocka Flame singles chronology
"No Hands" (2010)	"Grove St. Party" (2011)	"Welcome to My Hood (Remix)" (2011)

"Grove St. Party" is the fourth single by American rapper Waka Flocka Flame, which was released February 15, 2011 under the record label 1017 Brick Squad Records. It features rapper Kebo Gotti and is the fourth single from his debut album Flockaveli, which was released on October 5, 2010. The song was produced by Lex Luger.

== Music video ==
A music video for "Grove St. Party" premiered on MTV on April 8, 2011. Waka Flocka Flame, Kebo Gotti, and fellow rapper/Brick Squad CEO Gucci Mane appear in the video, which shows Waka departing a tour bus and making his way through a party of green lights which includes a dancing neon green Fozi Bear. Also, rapper YC appears in the video performing his "Racks" dance.

== Remix ==
Lil Wayne made a remix for his mixtape Sorry 4 the Wait, which features rapper Lil B. Prodigy of Mobb Deep released a remix called "It's a Body". Wiz Khalifa released a remix called "Reefer Party". Ace Hood also did a freestyle for the song.

== Chart performance ==
On the week ending February 27, 2011, "Grove St. Party" debuted at number 38 on the U.S. Billboard R&B/Hip-Hop Tracks chart. Since then it has reached a current peak of number 12, and reached number 10 on the Rap Songs chart. After two weeks of being on the Bubbling Under Hot 100 Singles chart, the song debuted on the U.S. Billboard Hot 100 at number 93, and in its next week on the chart, it propelled to number 82, and stayed there for its third week. The song has reached number 74 on the chart, and is Kebo Gotti's first and only charting song.

== Charts ==
=== Weekly charts ===
Chart (2011)	Peak position
US Billboard Hot 100	74
US Hot R&B/Hip-Hop Songs (Billboard)	12
US Hot Rap Songs (Billboard)	10
US Rhythmic Airplay (Billboard)	34

=== Year-end charts ===
Chart (2011)	Position
US Hot R&B/Hip-Hop Songs (Billboard)	59
