= Taylor Gang =

Taylor Gang may refer to:

- Taylor Gang Entertainment, a record label to whom Wiz Khalifa and Juicy J are signed, among other hip hop artists
- "Taylor Gang" (song), a 2011 song by American rapper Wiz Khalifa
- Jack Taylor Gang, an outlaw gang of the Old West
