= 9 A.M. =

9 A.M. or variants may refer to:

- A time on the 12-hour clock
- 9am with David & Kim, a former Australian TV show
- "9 AM", a 1988 song by Londonbeat
- "9 AM", a 2011 song with Waka Flocka Flame
- "9:00 A.M." (The Pitt season 1), episode 3 from season 1 of The Pitt
- "9:00 A.M." (The Pitt season 2), episode 3 from season 2 of The Pitt

== See also ==
- "9AM in Dallas", a song by Drake
- 9am to 5pm, 5pm to Whenever, an album by TYP
