= YC (rapper) =

American rapper from Georgia

- Also known as: Yung Chris, YC Worldwide
- Born: Christopher Daniels Miller; November 6, 1985 (age 40); Decatur, Georgia U.S.
- Genre: Hip hop
- Occupations: Rapper; songwriter
- Years active: 2006-present
- Labels: Big Play; 3022; Republic; Universal Motown; Block

Christopher Daniels Miller (born November 6, 1985), better known by his stage name YC, is an American rapper. He is best known for his 2011 debut single "Racks" (featuring Future), which peaked at number 42 on the Billboard Hot 100. Since then, several remixes and freestyles have been created of "Racks". His follow-up single, "I Know" (featuring Ace Hood or Yung Booke) released later that year.

== Early life ==
Born in Decatur, Georgia, he was raised by his stay-at-home mom and his father, Milton Miller Sr., who worked in the aviation industry. He attended both Columbia High School and McNair High School, but dropped out and didn't graduate. Originally under the moniker Yung Chris, he shortened it to YC to avoid confusion with another rapper Young Chris.

== Music career ==
YC was originally signed to Block Entertainment, formally known as Yung Chris and was a member of the rap group, Block Boyz. After disbanding himself from the label and group, he decided to focus on a solo career.

He was featured in the song, "Dem Girls", which features singer Yaboythetruth. After releasing the song, he recorded "Racks", featuring Future, for his first mixtape Got Racks, which was released for free download on April 5, 2011, and received over 24 million downloads via DatPiff. "Racks" was released on April 5, 2011. The song peaked at #6 on the Hot R&B/Hip Hop Songs chart. The video was directed by R. Malcolm Jones. He performed the single at the BET Awards of 2011. The song missed the top 40, peaking at #42 on the Billboard Hot 100 and stayed on the charts for 17 weeks.

He appeared in the video "This is What I Do", from Gucci Mane's 2011 album The Return of Mr. Zone 6, with Gucci, Waka Flocka Flame, and OJ da Juiceman. Gucci Mane also appeared in the music video for "Racks". YC appeared in Waka Flocka's video for "Grove St. Party", featuring rapper Kebo Gotti.

On October 4, 2011, he made his second single "I Know" and it features Yung Booke of T.I.'s group D.O.P.E. The video was directed by Mr. Starrize and became #23 in The Billboard Hot 100. Then YC released the remix as the second single on iTunes and it features Ace Hood. This was the second time that he and Ace Hood collaborated. YC later released the video for "Like This" featuring Yung Joc and Nephew (originally titled "Fucking Around"). The video was also directed by Mr. Starrize.

On March 9, 2012, YC released another mixtape Back From Vacation, the mixtape had over 8,000 downloads. On November 9, 2012, it was announced that YC was back in the studio, working on two new mixtapes, one of them revealed to be titled Gift to the Streets.

== Personal life ==
YC is the father of twelve children, all from different women.

== Discography ==
=== Mixtapes ===
List of mixtapes with selected details
Title	Album details
Got Racks	Released: April 5, 2011; Label: Big Play, 3022; Format: Digital download
Back From Vacation	Released: March 9, 2012; Label: Forever Flexin, Hood Rich; Format: Digital download
Gift to the Streets	Released: TBD; Label: Big Play, 3022; Format: Digital download

=== As lead artist ===
List of singles as lead artist, with selected chart positions and certifications, showing year released and album name
Title	Year	Peak chart positions			Certifications	Album
Title	Year	US	US R&B	US Rap	Certifications	Album
"Racks" (featuring Future)	2011	42	6	4	RIAA: Gold	Got Racks
"I Know" (featuring Ace Hood)	2011	123	—	—		Got Racks
"Main Chic" (featuring Young Thug)	2014	—	—	—		Non-album single
"—" denotes a recording that did not chart or was not released in that territory.

=== Music videos ===
List of music videos, with directors, showing year released
Title	Year	Director(s)
"Racks" (featuring Future)	2011	R. Malcolm Jones
"Racks" (Remix) (featuring Nelly, B.o.B, Trae, Yo Gotti, Cyhi the Prynce, Dose and Ace Hood)	2011	Ian Wolfson
"I Know" (featuring Yung Booke)	2011	Mr. Starrize
"Like This" (featuring Yung Joc)	2011	Mr. Starrize
"Lean & Sprite"	2011	none

== Guest appearances ==
List of non-single guest appearances, with other performing artists, showing year released and album name
Title	Year	Other artist(s)	Album
"Intro"	2006	P.O.L.O., Chamillionaire	Reckless
"Cutty"	2006	P.O.L.O., Tramee	Reckless
"Reckless"	2006	P.O.L.O., Kurt Dogg	Reckless
"Give a Fuck"	2006	P.O.L.O., Big Floss	Reckless
"Kool"	2006	P.O.L.O.	Reckless
"Watch Me"	2009	Gorilla Zoe	Don't Feed Da Animals
"Sum Tho"	2010	Rich Kidz	24/7
"Get It Started"	2010	King Just, Nate	Pollen: The Swarm, Pt. 3
"Psycho"	2011	Gucci Mane, YG Hootie	Writings On The Wall 2
"Play Your Cards"	2011	Gucci Mane	Writings On The Wall 2
"Bout Dem 100s"	2011	Slim Dunkin, D-Bo, Jody Breeze	Block Illegal
"For a Long Time"	2011	Rich Kid Shawty	Shad Marley
"Hundreds"	2011	Waka Flocka Flame, Slim Dunkin, Jody Breeze	Twin Towers 2 (No Fly Zone)
"Stretch This (Remix)"	2011	Rich Kid Shawty	Splurge On Em
"How You Want It"	2012	Ice Burgandy	Progress Involves Risk Unfortunately
"Death Around the Corner"	2012	Wooh da Kid, Waka Flocka Flame, Ice B	Strap-a-Holics 2.0: Reloaded
"Brand New"	2012	Gucci Mane	The Fast Life 2
"Big Money"	2012	Stebo, Young Thug	none
"Boot Up"	2014	Young Thug	none
