= Taylor Gang (song) =

Promotional single by Wiz Khalifa featuring Chevy Woods

from the album Rolling Papers
- Released: August 4, 2011
- Genre: Hip hop, trap
- Length: 5:35
- Label: Rostrum, Atlantic
- Songwriter(s): Cameron Thomaz, Lexus Lewis, Chevy Woods
- Producer(s): Lex Luger

"Taylor Gang" is a song by American rapper Wiz Khalifa, originally from his mixtape Cabin Fever, later included as the iTunes bonus track on his debut studio album Rolling Papers (2011). The song was written and produced by Lex Luger and features fellow Pittsburgh rapper Chevy Woods.

The song peaked at number 22 on the Bubbling Under Hot 100 chart.

== Background ==
The song "Initiation" off Wiz Khalifa's second album O.N.I.F.C. (2012) has been described as being a sequel to "Taylor Gang".

== Music video ==
Two music videos were filmed for the song, both directed by Bill Palladino. The first music video shows the Taylor Gang crew members with animated smiley faces and wearing colored wigs while celebrating, smoking marijuana and drinking; however, the video was rejected due to its content and was released on Wiz Khalifa's website. The second and official music video was released through Atlantic Records and shows footage of Wiz Khalifa performing at several on-stage concerts.

== Charts ==
| Chart (2011) | Peak position |
|---|---|
| US Billboard Bubbling Under Hot 100 Singles | 22 |

== Certifications ==
| Region | Certification | Certified units/sales |
|---|---|---|
| United States (RIAA) | Gold | 500,000^{‡} |
^{‡} Sales+streaming figures based on certification alone.
