= Salute Me or Shoot Me 4 (Banned from America) =

Mixtape by Waka Flocka Flame
- Released: September 13, 2012
- Recorded: 2011–2012
- Genre: Southern hip hop
- Length: 60:32
- Label: 1017 Brick Squad; Brick Squad Monopoly
- Producer: Southside; TM88; Envy; London on da Track; Terry on Da Beats; Van Camp; Kaleon; Joe Boom; G-Luck

Waka Flocka Flame chronology
Lebron Flocka James 3 (2011)	Salute Me or Shoot Me 4 (Banned from America) (2012)	DuFlocka Rant 2 (2013)

Salute Me or Shoot Me 4 (Banned from America) is a mixtape by American rapper Waka Flocka Flame. It was released on September 13, 2012. The mixtape features guest appearances from Gucci Mane, Wale, Roscoe Dash, Frenchie, Yo Gotti, Dorrough, Shawty Lo, Trae Tha Truth, Wooh Da Kid, and Chief Keef among others.

== Critical response ==
Professional ratings
Review scores
Source	Rating
Pitchfork	6.7/10
XXL	(L)

Adam Fleischer of XXL gave the mixtape an L, saying "The beats here are all calculatedly trap music-tested, as is Salute Me or Shoot Me 4‘s content. But that’s precisely what Waka was aiming for, and what he needed. Though the style of his energy and aggression on record is no longer as surprising as it initially was, it’s still just as magnetic. When given two choices with this tape’s title, a salute for Waka is probably both safer and more fitting." Jordan Sargent of Pitchfork gave the mixtape a 6.7 out of 10, saying "Waka's energy has an almost gravitational pull and it's as strong here as ever. But lately, he's begun to expose a softer side of himself (like subtitling his last album Friends, Fans, and Family) that makes him Fozzie Bear-lovable. In fact, his songs are hardly even angry anymore. There's a gleeful streak running through Salute Me 4 that gives it a decidedly different vibe: It's an hour of shouting that sounds like a hug."

== Track listing ==
No.	Title	Writer(s)	Producer(s)	Length
1.	"50K" (featuring Gucci Mane)	Juaquin Malphurs; Joshua Luellen; Bryan Simmons	Southside; TM88	3:58
2.	"Death of Me"	Malphurs; Luellen; Simmons	Southside; TM88	3:59
3.	"J. Well"	Malphurs; Luellen; Simmons	Southside; TM88	4:16
4.	"24 Hours" (featuring S.O.N.Y.)	Malphurs	Envy	4:08
5.	"Lock & Load" (featuring Bambiino Gold and Cartel MGM)	Malphurs; Luellen; Simmons	Southside; TM88	4:52
6.	"Tweakin'"	Malphurs; Luellen; Simmons	Southside; TM88	4:20
7.	"Turnt" (featuring Wale and Roscoe Dash)	Malphurs; Luellen; Simmons	Southside; TM88	4:48
8.	"Randy Savage" (featuring B. Ceeze and Frenchie)	Malphurs; London Holmes	London on da Track	3:27
9.	"Money Pile" (featuring Gucci Mane, Yo Gotti and D Dash)	Malphurs	Terry on da Beat	3:52
10.	"Out the Bag"	Malphurs	Van Camp	3:17
11.	"Solo" (featuring Dorrough and Shawty Lo)	Malphurs; Gavin Luckett; Joe Boom	Gavin "G-Luck" Luckett, Joe Boom	4:18
12.	"I Got 'Em" (featuring Trae tha Truth)	Malphurs	Kaleon	4:07
13.	"Zip 'Em Up" (featuring Wooh da Kid and D Dash)	Malphurs; Luellen; Simmons	Southside; TM88	4:36
14.	"Murda" (featuring Chief Keef and Bo Deal)	Malphurs; Luellen	Southside	3:44
15.	"Realest Shit I Wrote"	Malphurs	Terry on Da Beat	4:38
