= Round of Applause (Waka Flocka Flame song) =

Single by Waka Flocka Flame featuring Drake

from the album Triple F Life: Fans, Friends & Family
- Released: October 14, 2011
- Recorded: 2011
- Genre: Southern hip hop
- Length: 4:26
- Label: 1017 Brick Squad, Warner Bros., Asylum
- Songwriters: Juaquin Malphurs; Aubrey Graham; Lexus Lewis
- Producer: Lex Luger

Waka Flocka Flame singles chronology
"Wild Boy" (2011)	"Round of Applause" (2011)	"I Don't Really Care" (2012)

Drake singles chronology
"Still Got It" (2011)	"Round of Applause" (2011)	"Tony Montana" (2011)

Music video
- "Round of Applause" on YouTube

"Round of Applause" is a song by American rapper Waka Flocka Flame featuring Canadian rapper Drake. Written alongside producers Lex Luger and Southside, the song was released on October 14, 2011, as the lead single from Waka's second studio album Triple F Life: Fans, Friends & Family.

== Background ==
The song leaked, without Drake, in early August 2011. Drake remixed the song, and released it through his official blog October's Very Own, on September 11, 2011, stating: "First Lex Luger beat I ever got to rap on...feel like I got seat B60 on Southwest...everybody has gone in before me...but we made it happen!". On October 13, 2011, it was announced Waka Flocka Flame chose to master the remix and release it as the official single.

== Music video ==
On January 20, 2012, Janice Llamoca, cheerleader of the Los Angeles Lakers released some footage of the making-of the music video, recorded with her iPhone. On January 30, official behind-the-scenes footage was released. On February 25, 2012, the official music video, directed by Mr. Boomtown was released. Young Money rapper Lil Chuckee and Draya from Basketball Wives make cameo appearances.

== Chart performance ==
"Round of Applause" debuted at number 97 on the Billboard Hot 100 the week of December 24, 2011 and peaked at number 86 the week of December 31 before leaving the chart at the beginning of 2012. It reappeared on the week of January 21, 2012 at number 97 and reached number 89 for two non-consecutive weeks, remaining on the chart for eight weeks.

=== Weekly charts ===
Chart (2011–2012)	Peak position
US Billboard Hot 100	86
US Hot R&B/Hip-Hop Songs (Billboard)	15
US Hot Rap Songs (Billboard)	16
US Rhythmic Airplay (Billboard)	29

=== Year-end charts ===
Chart (2012)	Position
US Hot R&B/Hip-Hop Songs (Billboard)	56

== Release history ==
Country	Date	Format	Label
United States	October 14, 2011	Digital download	Warner Bros. Records
