= Rooster in My Rari =

Promotional single by Waka Flocka Flame

from the album Triple F Life: Friends, Fans & Family
- Released: 28 May 2012
- Genre: Hip hop
- Length: 2:49
- Songwriter(s): Juaquin Malphurs; Gary "DJ Spinz" Hill
- Producer(s): DJ Spinz

Music video
- Official music video on YouTube

Rooster in My Rari is a song by American rapper Waka Flocka Flame from his second studio album, Triple F Life: Friends, Fans & Family (2012). The song was written by Waka Flocka Flame and DJ Spinz; the latter also produced the song. It was released on May 28, 2012 as a promotional single from the album.

== Music video ==
On June 11, 2012, the music video was released for "Rooster In My Rari".

== Charts ==
Chart (2012)	Peak position
US Hot R&B/Hip-Hop Songs (Billboard)	120
