= Low Pros =

American-Canadian musical duo

- Origin: Atlanta, GA, US
- Genres: Electronic, hip hop, trap
- Years active: 2014–present
- Labels: Fool's Gold
- Members: A-Trak; Lex Luger

Low Pros are a musical duo consisting of Canadian DJ A-Trak and American hip-hop producer Lex Luger. They released their first EP, titled EP 1, on May 6, 2014.

== History ==
In early 2014, while on vacation in Atlanta, A-Trak met with Lex Luger. The two had several studio sessions, resulting in the first Low Pros' records. Their first release, the song "Jack Tripper" was well received by critics. Consequence of Sound described it as "a sweaty, swaggering banger down to the last swift beat" and Max Weinstein of Vibe called it "one hell of a recipe." Low Pros' second release, "100 Bottles" was placed at number five on Consequence of Sound's Top 10 Songs of the Week in February 2014, who compared the duo to TNGHT.

On March 14, 2014, Low Pros performed at the Fool's Gold Showcase at Empire Garage in Austin, Texas, during the SXSW festival. After previewing several tracks during 2014, Low Pros released their debut EP on May 6, 2014, on Fool's Gold Records. The seven track record features co-production from High Klassified and Brillz, and guest appearances from Young Thug, Juvenile, Travis Scott, Que and PeeWee Longway.

Miles Raymer of Pitchfork described the EP as "the best kind of team-up record, where two artists with two very different aesthetics get together and find common ground by throwing everything they have against the wall." The Fader commented that the EP "[finds] common ground between Luger's booming trap beats and the festival-ready electronica A-Trak excels at." On May 20, 2014, OG Ron C released a chopped not slopped remix of EP 1.

== Discography ==
=== Extended plays ===
List of extended plays and selected details
Title	Album details
EP 1	Released: May 6, 2014; Label: Fool's Gold; Formats: digital download
