= Slim Dunkin =

American rapper (1987–2011)

- Born: August 20, 1987; Detroit, Michigan, U.S.
- Died: December 16, 2011 (aged 24); Atlanta, Georgia, U.S.
- Genres: Hip hop; trap
- Occupations: Rapper; singer; songwriter
- Years active: 2009–2011
- Labels: 1017 Records

Mario Denzel Hamilton (August 20, 1987 – December 16, 2011), better known by his stage name Slim Dunkin, was an American rapper. He was signed to Gucci Mane's record label 1017 Records. Hamilton frequently collaborated with Mane, alongside Waka Flocka Flame and D-Bo (now known as Derez De'Shon).

== Career ==
Hamilton began his music career in 2009. His first solo mixtape, Built 4 Interrogation, was released in 2010.

== Death ==
On December 16, 2011, around 5:30 PM, Hamilton was preparing to shoot a music video when he engaged in a verbal altercation with another person. He was then shot once in the chest with a handgun. Hamilton was rushed to Grady Memorial Hospital, where he was pronounced dead.

Witnesses stated that the argument that led to Hamilton's killing was over a piece of candy. Statements conflicted, however, with a police officer telling the AP, "It seems everybody witnessed something very different ... We’re just trying to go back and make sense of everything."

On December 26, Vinson Hardimon, also known as Young Vito, was arrested by Atlanta police after turning himself in and was charged with the murder of Hamilton. On February 26, 2013, Hardimon was acquitted of the murder charge; however, he was sentenced to 25 years in prison on related assault and weapons charges.

== Discography ==
=== Compilation albums ===
Title	Album details
The Dunkumentary	Released: December 30, 2011; Label: 1017 Brick Squad, Brick Squad Monopoly; Format: Digital download, streaming

=== Mixtapes ===
Title	Mixtape details
Twin Towers (with Waka Flocka Flame)	Released: July 23, 2009; Label: So Icey, 1017 Brick Squad; Format: Digital download, streaming
Built 4 Interrogation	Released: February 22, 2010; Label: So Icey, 1017 Brick Squad; Format: Digital download, streaming
Dunkin the Competition	Released: May 2, 2010; Label: So Icey, 1017 Brick Squad; Format: Digital download, streaming
Bad Boys (with Sy Ari da Kid)	Released: June 2, 2010; Label: 1017 Brick Squad; Format: Digital download, streaming
Menace II Society	Released: October 31, 2010; Label: 1017 Brick Squad, Brick Squad Monopoly, Mizay; Format: Digital download, streaming
Block Illegal (with D-Bo)	Released: March 24, 2011; Label: 1017 Brick Squad, Brick Squad Monopoly; Format: Digital download, streaming
Twin Towers 2 (No Fly Zone) (with Waka Flocka Flame)	Released: August 5, 2011; Label: Brick Squad Monopoly; Format: Digital download, streaming
Block Illegal 2 (with D-Bo)	Released: July 20, 2012; Label: Brick Squad Monopoly; Format: Digital download, streaming
Bad Boys for Life (with Sy Ari da Kid)	Released: July 26, 2012; Label: 1017 Brick Squad, Brick Squad Monopoly; Format: Digital download, streaming

=== Charted singles ===
Title	Year	Peak chart positions	Album
Title	Year	US R&B/HH	Album
"She Be Puttin' On" (Gucci Mane and Waka Flocka Flame featuring Slim Dunkin)	2011	77	Ferrari Boyz
