= Racks (song) =

2011 single by YC and Future

Single by YC featuring Future

from the album Got Racks
- Released: April 5, 2011
- Recorded: 2011
- Genre: Hip hop, trap
- Length: 4:45 (original); 13:20 (remix)
- Label: Big Play; 3022; Universal Motown
- Songwriters: Christopher Miller; Nayvadius Wilburn; Sonny Uwaezuoke; Anthony Garner
- Producers: Student; Sonny Digital

YC singles chronology
"Racks" (2011)	"I Know" (2011)

Future singles chronology
"Racks" (2011)	"Tony Montana" (2011)

Music video
- "Racks" on YouTube

"Racks" is the debut single by American rapper YC featuring fellow American rapper Future. Produced by Sonny Digital and Student, the song was released for digital download in the United States on April 5, 2011, and serves as a single for YC's debut mixtape Got Racks. The song also peaked at No. 42 on the US Billboard Hot 100 and stayed on the chart for 17 weeks.

== Music video ==
The music video for "Racks" was released on April 18, 2011 on Vevo. Sonny Digital, Gucci Mane, Young Scooter, Rocko, Slim Dunkin, Zaytoven, Mike Will Made-It, and Shawty Lo make cameo appearances.

== Remix ==
"Racks (Remix)"

Single by YC featuring Young Jeezy, Wiz Khalifa, Waka Flocka Flame, B.o.B, Cyhi the Prynce, Yo Gotti, Wale, Cory Gunz, Bun B, Big Sean, Twista, Nelly, Dose, Cory Mo, Trae tha Truth and Ace Hood
- Released: 2011
- Length: 13:20
- Label: Universal Motown; Big Play; 3022
- Producers: Sonny Digital, Student

The official remix was released on May 20, 2011, and features rappers Young Jeezy, Wiz Khalifa, Waka Flocka Flame, B.o.B, Yo Gotti, Wale, Big Sean, Cory Gunz, Twista, Bun B, Dose, Cory Mo, Nelly, CyHi the Prynce, Trae and Ace Hood. The music video for the remix was released on June 28, 2011, and features Nelly, B.o.B, Trae tha Truth, Yo Gotti, CyHi the Prynce, Dose and Ace Hood.

Rapper Lil Wayne recorded a freestyle over the instrumental for his mixtape Sorry 4 the Wait. Lil' Kim also recorded a freestyle included on her mixtape Black Friday. British rapper Dappy also released a freestyle of the song, titled "Tarzan Freestyle".

== Lyrical content ==
The lyrics make references to purple drank ("lean"), Xanax ("bars"), marijuana ("chron a.k.a. chronic"), cocaine ("yayo or white"), and MDMA ("bean").

== Charts and certifications ==
=== Weekly charts ===
Chart (2011)	Peak position
US Billboard Hot 100	42
US Hot R&B/Hip-Hop Songs (Billboard)	6
US Hot Rap Songs (Billboard)	4

=== Year-end charts ===
Chart (2011)	Peak position
US Hot R&B/Hip-Hop Songs (Billboard)	43
US Rap Songs (Billboard)	24

=== Certifications ===
Region	Certification	Certified units/sales
United States (RIAA)	Gold	500,000^{*}
^{*} Sales figures based on certification alone.
