= Ferrari Boyz =

Studio album by Waka Flocka Flame & Gucci Mane
- Released: August 9, 2011
- Recorded: 2011; Patchwerk Studios (Atlanta, Georgia)
- Genre: Southern hip hop; trap
- Length: 47:02 (standard); 60:49 (deluxe)
- Label: 1017 Brick Squad; Mizay; Warner Bros.
- Producer: Southside; Zaytoven; 808 Mafia; Drumma Boy; Fatboi; Lex Luger; Honorable C.N.O.T.E.; Billionaire Boyscout; Shawty Redd; Schife; D. Rich; Exchange Student

Gucci Mane chronology
| The Return of Mr. Zone 6 (2011) | Ferrari Boyz (2011) | BAYTL (2011) |

Waka Flocka Flame chronology
| Flockaveli (2010) | Ferrari Boyz (2011) | Triple F Life: Friends, Fans & Family (2012) |

Singles from Ferrari Boyz
- 1. "She Be Puttin' On" Released: July 8, 2011

Professional ratings
Aggregate scores
| Source | Rating |
|---|---|
| Metacritic | 57/100 |
Review scores
| Source | Rating |
| AllMusic | 2.5/5 stars |
| HipHopDX | 2/5 stars |
| The New York Times | (favorable) |
| NOW | 3/5 stars |
| Pitchfork Media | (6.3/10) |
| Prefix | (7/10) |
| RapReviews | (5/10) |
| Rolling Stone | 2/5 stars |
| XXL | 3/5 stars |

Ferrari Boyz is a collaborative studio album by American rappers Gucci Mane and Waka Flocka Flame. Originally scheduled for a June 21, 2011, release, it was delayed and later released on August 9. It features Rocko, 2 Chainz, 1017 Brick Squad labelmates Wooh da Kid, and Frenchie, and also Brick Squad Monopoly members Slim Dunkin (now deceased), Ice Burgundy, and YG Hootie. The album was mostly produced by label producer Southside, with additional production by Zaytoven, 808 Mafia, Drumma Boy, Lex Luger, Fatboi, Shawty Redd, and Schife. According to Waka Flocka, the album was completed in two weeks.

== Singles ==
The first single from the album is the Drumma Boy-produced "Ferrari Boyz." "She Be Puttin' On," featuring former labelmate Slim Dunkin, was released on iTunes as the second single on July 8, 2011. It was produced by 808 Mafia's Southside and Lex Luger. The music video for the song was released on August 9, 2011. The music video for the song "Pacman," produced by Southside, was released on August 10. There are also videos for two other Ferrari Boyz songs — "Suicide Homicide," featuring Wooh da Kid, and also produced by Southside, which premiered on August 2, 2011, and the Shawty Redd-produced "Stoned," released on April 11. In 2013, the song "Young Niggaz" was featured in the Harmony Korine movie Spring Breakers.

== Commercial performance ==
Ferrari Boyz debuted on the Billboard 200 at number 21, with first-week sales of 17,000 copies in the United States.

== Critical reception ==
Ferrari Boyz received generally mixed reviews from music critics. At Metacritic, which assigns a normalized rating out of 100 to reviews from mainstream critics, the album received an average score of 57, based on 10 reviews, which indicates "mixed or average reviews". Evan Serpick of Rolling Stone awarded it 2 out of 5 stars and said not to "expect innovation from these titans of Southern rap. Instead, brace yourself for chanted celebrations of money, cars, cocaine, and Waka and Gucci themselves." He commented that "Gucci delivers mush-mouthed lines" and Waka fails to rise to the level of his 2010 debut. David Jeffries of Allmusic remarked that "hearing Gucci and Waka simultaneously do their name-dropping bits is a delicious kind of ridiculous that's not worth getting stern over" Carl Chery of XXL awarded it an L rating, commenting that the two were "lyrically challenged," with the album falling redundant at times, but on the whole it "features more studs than duds".

== Track listing ==
| No. | Title | Writer(s) | Producer(s) | Length |
|---|---|---|---|---|
| 1. | "Ferrari Boyz" | Radric Davis; Juaquin Malphurs; Christopher Gholson | Drumma Boy | 4:05 |
| 2. | "15th and the 1st" (featuring YG Hootie) | Davis; Malphurs; Lamar Joseph; Joshua Luellen | Southside | 3:52 |
| 3. | "Break Her" | Davis; Malphurs; Schife Karbeen; Garner | Schife; Exchange Student (co.) | 3:55 |
| 4. | "Feed Me" (featuring Frenchie) | Davis; Malphurs; Luellen | Southside | 4:35 |
| 5. | "Mud Musik" (featuring Titi Boi) | Davis; Malphurs; Tauheed Epps; Luellen | Southside | 4:44 |
| 6. | "In My Business" (featuring Rocko) | Davis; Malphurs; Rodney Hill, Jr.; Demetrius Stewart | D. Rich | 4:52 |
| 7. | "Young Niggaz" | Davis; Malphurs; Luellen | Southside | 3:23 |
| 8. | "Suicide Homicide" (featuring Wooh da Kid) | Davis; J. Malphurs; Nyquan Malphurs | Southside | 3:43 |
| 9. | "I Don't See U" (featuring Ice Burgandy) | Davis; Malphurs; Jabari Hechavarria; Luellen | Southside | 4:33 |
| 10. | "PacMan" | Davis; Malphurs; Luellen | Southside | 3:26 |
| 11. | "Stoned" | Davis; Malphurs; Stewart | Shawty Redd | 3:57 |
| 12. | "She Be Puttin' On" (featuring Slim Dunkin) | Davis; Malphurs; Luellen; Lewis; Mario Hamilton | Southside | 4:22 |
| Total length: | | | | 47:32 |

Deluxe edition
| No. | Title | Writer(s) | Producer(s) | Length |
|---|---|---|---|---|
| 13. | "So Many Things" | Davis; Malphurs; LaDamon Douglas; R. Lyle | Fatboi | 2:56 |
| 14. | "Too Loyal" (featuring Slim Dunkin) | Davis; Malphurs; Hamilton; Douglas | Fatboi | 3:46 |
| 15. | "What the Hell" (featuring Rocko) | Davis; Malphurs; Hill; Gholson | Drumma Boy | 4:39 |
| Total length: | | | | 60:49 |

== Charts ==
| Chart (2005) | Peak position |
|---|---|
| US Billboard 200 | 20 |
| US Top R&B/Hip-Hop Albums (Billboard) | 5 |
| US Top Rap Albums (Billboard) | 4 |
