= Hard in da Paint =

Single by Waka Flocka Flame

from the album Flockaveli
- Released: August 24, 2009 (Mixtape Track): May 13, 2010 (Single)
- Recorded: 2009
- Genre: Southern hip hop; gangsta rap; trap; crunk
- Length: 4:03
- Label: 1017 Brick Squad; Warner Bros.; Asylum
- Songwriters: Juaquin Malphurs; Lexus Arnel Lewis
- Producer: Lex Luger

Waka Flocka Flame singles chronology
"Bingo" (2010)	"Hard in da Paint" (2009)	"No Hands" (2010)

"Hard in da Paint" is the second single from American rapper Waka Flocka Flame's debut studio album Flockaveli.

== Background ==
Waka Flocka's "Hard in da Paint", like his previous hit "O Let's Do It", was originally a mixtape track. It first appeared as "Go Hard" on his third mixtape, Salute Me Or Shoot Me 2, released on August 24, 2009. An early remix featuring French Montana was released on April 19, 2010, and appeared in the latter's ninth mixtape titled Mac & Cheese 2, released on May 6. The track was produced by then-up-and-coming producer Lex Luger, and went on to become an underground hit before being released as a commercial single on May 13.

== Music video ==
The music video was released on July 19, 2010. During the music video the production was shut down by gang activity and police presence due to the Black P. Stones Bloods gang injunction. The music video was directed by Benny Boom. It was shot on Palmwood Drive in Baldwin Village, Los Angeles, often referred to as "the Jungles", a neighborhood made infamous courtesy of the Denzel Washington movie Training Day.

== Reception ==
In August 2014, Pitchfork listed the track at number 41 on their "The 200 Best Tracks of the Decade So Far (2010-2014)."

== Remixes ==
An official remix featuring French Montana was released on April 19, while a second remix featuring Gucci Mane was released on June 22.

R&B singer Ciara released her own remix of the song on June 2, 2010. Rappers 2 Chainz, Young Jeezy and Pusha T released a version of the song titled "Hard in the Kitchen" on February 11, 2011.

== Parodies ==
A popular video parody of "Hard in da Paint" was posted on YouTube, with Barack Obama (played by comedian James Davis) as the subject of the song. The "Baracka Flacka Flames: Head of the State" video has gained over 16 million views as of 2025.

== Charts ==
=== Weekly charts ===
Chart (2010)	Peak position
US Bubbling Under Hot 100 (Billboard)	10
US Hot R&B/Hip-Hop Songs (Billboard)	28

=== Year-end charts ===
Chart (2010)	Position
US Hot R&B/Hip-Hop Songs (Billboard)	94
