= DuFlocka Rant 2 =

Mixtape by Waka Flocka Flame
- Released: February 5, 2013
- Genre: Hip hop
- Length: 53:53
- Label: 1017 Brick Squad

Waka Flocka Flame chronology
Salute Me or Shoot Me 4 (Banned from America) (2012)	DuFlocka Rant 2 (2013)	DuFlocka Rant: Halftime Show (2013)

DuFlocka Rant 2 is a mixtape by the American rapper Waka Flocka Flame. It was released on February 5, 2013, by 1017 Brick Squad.

== Background and release ==
DuFlocka Rant 2 was released by 1017 Brick Squad on February 5, 2013. It is the sequel to Waka Flocka Flame's DuFlocka Rant, which was released in 2011. A music video for the track "Can't Do Gold" was later released.

== Composition ==
A hip hop mixtape, DuFlocka Rant 2 was hosted by Trapaholics and DJ Ace. The opening track, "Stay Hood", features rapper Lil Wayne. The mixtape also contains guest appearances from Gucci Mane, Ace Hood, French Montana, and others.

== Critical reception ==
Professional ratings
Review scores
Source	Rating
Pitchfork	7.1/10
Rolling Stone	3.5/5 stars

In a Rolling Stone review, Nick Catucci wrote "The bouncy production is as smooth as Waka is spiky." Pitchfork's Miles Raymer wrote: "Records like DR2 aren’t just distractions, they’re sonic power washers blasting out whatever psychic residue you have gunking up the corners of your brain."

== Track listing ==
DuFlocka Rant 2 track listing
No.	Title	Length
1.	"Stay Hood" (featuring Lil Wayne)	3:32
2.	"Can't Do Golds"	3:09
3.	"Fell" (featuring Gucci Mane & Young Thug)	4:20
4.	"Murda She Wrote" (featuring Cartel MGM & Young Scooter)	4:01
5.	"Hood Rich"	3:20
6.	"College Girl" (featuring Quez of Travis Porter)	4:00
7.	"Fast Forward"	2:37
8.	"Two Gunz Up" (featuring Wooh Da Kid & Ice Burgundy)	3:40
9.	"Brother's Keeper" (featuring Wooh Da Kid)	3:00
10.	"Bad Decision" (featuring Wooh Da Kid)	4:20
11.	"Shit Where You Sleep" (featuring Ace Hood)	3:00
12.	"Ain't Right" (featuring Chaz Gotti & D Dash)	4:02
13.	"Tax Money" (featuring Wooh Da Kid)	3:02
14.	"Anything but Broke" (featuring French Montana & Frenchie)	4:11
15.	"Real Recognize Real"	3:11
16.	"DuFlocka Rant Pt. 2 Outro"	0:28
Total length:		53:53
