= I Don't Really Care (Waka Flocka Flame song) =

Single by Waka Flocka Flame featuring Trey Songz

from the album Triple F Life: Friends, Fans & Family
- Released: March 20, 2012
- Genre: Hip hop
- Length: 3:55
- Label: 1017 Brick Squad, Warner Bros., Asylum
- Songwriters: Juaquin Malphurs, Tremaine Neverson, Aaron Smith
- Producers: Skyy Stylez, Troy Taylor

Waka Flocka Flame singles chronology
"Round of Applause" (2012)	"I Don't Really Care" (2012)	"Lights Down Low" (2012)

Trey Songz singles chronology
"Can't Get Enough" (2011)	"I Don't Really Care" (2012)	"Heart Attack" (2012)

"I Don't Really Care" is a song by American hip hop recording artist Waka Flocka Flame. It was released on March 20, 2012 as the second single from his second studio album Triple F Life: Friends, Fans & Family (2012). The song, produced by Skyy Stylez and Troy Taylor, features a guest appearance from American R&B singer Trey Songz. The song debuted and peaked at number 64 on the Billboard Hot 100 for the chart week dating April 14, 2012: it also peaked at number 73 on the Hot R&B/Hip-Hop Songs chart and at number 20 on the Hot Rap Songs chart.

== Music video ==
A music video for the song, directed by Taj Stansberry, was filmed in Atlanta in April 2012 and premiered on May 1, 2012.

== Track listing ==
Digital download

1. "I Don't Really Care" (Explicit) (featuring Trey Songz) – 3:55
2. "I Don't Really Care" (Clean) (featuring Trey Songz) – 3:42

== Charts ==
Chart (2012)	Peak position
US Billboard Hot 100	64
US Hot R&B/Hip-Hop Songs (Billboard)	25
US Hot Rap Songs (Billboard)	20
