= Kebo Gotti =

American rapper

Kebo Gotti is an American rapper from Atlanta, Georgia. He became known for being featured on Waka Flocka Flame's single "Grove St. Party" in 2009. He was previously signed with 1017 Brick Squad.

== Early life ==
Keebo Gotti was born on July 27 in Atlanta, Georgia.

== Career ==
Gotti appeared on the Waka Flocka Flame single, "Grove St. Party", the fourth and final single from Flame's debut album, Flockaveli (2010). The music video for "Grove St. Party" includes Kebo, Gucci Mane and YC. On February 27, 2011, "Grove St. Party" entered at #38 on the U.S. Billboard R&B/Hip-Hop Tracks chart, peaking at #12. It also climbed the Billboard Rap Songs charts, reaching #10, and on the U.S. Billboard Hot 100 at #74.

== Discography ==
- Kebo Gotti - Anybody Can Get It – 1st mixtape
- Kebo Gotti - Real Street ****s (featuring Wooh Da Kid & Bo Deal)
- Kebo Gotti - 100 [Prod. By South Side]
- Kebo Gotti – Exotic
- Kebo Gotti - We Straight (featuring Block 125) [Prod. By Lil Lody]
- Waka Flocka Flame - Grove St. Party (featuring Kebo Gotti)
- Waka Flocka Flame - Fresh & Fly (featuring Kebo Gotti, Lil Cap, Slim Dunkin & Cassidy) (3:49)
- Waka Flocka Flame - Robot Rapper (featuring Kebo Gotti & Bo Deal) [Prod. By Southside On The Track]
- Waka Flocka Flame - Fight (featuring Slim Dunkin, Kebo Gotti & Lil' Capp) [Prod. By Tay Beatz]
- Waka Flocka Flame - Clayco (featuring Gucci Mane, Kebo Gotti, Cartel MGM & Lil' Capp) [Prod. By Southside On The Track]
- Waka Flocka Flame - Pot Of Gold (featuring YG Hootie & Kebo Gotti)
- Waka Flocka Flame - Pass Around (featuring Kebo Gotti & Slim Dunkin)
- Waka Flocka Flame - Ray Ray (featuring Kebo Gotti & Lil' Capp)
- Waka Flocka Flame - Lebron Flocka James 2
- Waka Flocka Flame - Salute Me Or Shoot Me 2
- Waka Flocka Flame - Kebo Gotti (Interlude)
- Waka Flocka Flame - DuFlocka Rant
- Roscoe Dash - Show Out (Remix) (featuring Kebo Gotti)
- YC – Racks (featuring Kebo Gotti)
- Gorilla Zoe - All We Do Is Work
- Lil Capp - Jimmy Capp Carter
- Lil Capp - Caplanta (Hosted By Mike Mike)
- Lil Capp - Cut Da Check (featuring Ace Boon Coon & Kebo Gotti)
- Lil Capp - Shoot It Out (featuring Doeshun, Kebo Gotti & Shawn Jay) [Prod. By Southside On The Track]
- Lil Capp - Quit Lyin (featuring Fresh, Rico Gotti, Pimp Mode, T.O. Green & Kebo Gotti)
- Lil Capp - Ray Ray (featuring Waka Flocka Flame & Kebo Gotti)
- Lil Capp - I See You (featuring Kebo Gotti)
- Slim Dunkin - F*ck With Me (featuring OJ Da Juiceman, Parlae, Da KID & Kebo Gotti)[Prod. By Kritical]
- Wooh Da Kid - Real Street ****z (featuring Kebo Gotti & Bo Deal) [Prod. By Southside On The Track]
- Wooh Da Kid - Real ****z (featuring Kebo Gotti & Bo Deal)[Prod. By Southside]
- Wooh Da Kid - Strap-A-Holics
- Trap Music - Gametime Edition
- Trap Music - In The Hood For The Holidays
- Trap Music - Trappy New Year!
- Trap Music - Play Me Some Pimpin (Hosted By Bishop Don Magic Juan & Three 6 Mafia)
