= O Let's Do It =

2009 single by Waka Flocka Flame

Single by Waka Flocka Flame featuring Lil' Capp

from the album Flockaveli
- Released: April 14, 2009
- Recorded: August 2008
- Genre: Southern hip hop
- Length: 4:12
- Label: 1017 Brick Squad, Warner Bros., Asylum
- Songwriters: J. Malphurs, D. Winters
- Producer: L-Don Beatz

Waka Flocka Flame singles chronology
"O Let's Do It" (2009)	"Bingo" (2010)

Lil' Capp singles chronology
"O Let's Do It" (2009)

"O Let's Do It" is the debut single from American rapper Waka Flocka Flame's debut studio album, Flockaveli. The song features Lil' Capp, who is not credited on the single version.

== Track listing ==
Digital single

No.	Title	Writer(s)	Producer(s)	Length
1.	"O Let's Do It"	J. Malphurs, D. Winters	L-Don Beatz	4:12

CD single

No.	Title	Writer(s)	Producer(s)	Length
1.	"O Let's Do It" (clean version)	J. Malphurs, D. Winters	L-Don Beatz	4:13
2.	"O Let's Do It" (explicit version)	J. Malphurs	L-Don Beatz	4:12

Remix single

No.	Title	Writer(s)	Producer(s)	Length
1.	"O Let's Do It" (Remix) (featuring Diddy, Rick Ross and Gucci Mane)	J. Malphurs, S. Combs, W. Roberts, R. Davis, D. Winters	L-Don Beatz	4:41

== Remixes ==
"O Let's Do It (Remix)"

Single by Waka Flocka Flame featuring Diddy, Rick Ross and Gucci Mane

from the album Flockaveli
- Released: April 13, 2010
- Recorded: 2009–2010
- Genre: Southern hip hop
- Label: 1017 Brick Squad, Warner Bros., Asylum
- Songwriters: J. Malphurs, S. Combs, W. Roberts, R. Davis, D. Winters
- Producer: L-Don Beatz

Waka Flocka Flame singles chronology
"Bingo" (2010)	"O Let's Do It (Remix)" (2010)	"Hard in Da Paint" (2010)

Diddy singles chronology
"Love Come Down" (2009)	"O Let's Do It (Remix)" (2010)	"Hello, Good Morning" (2010)

The official remix features Diddy, Rick Ross, & Gucci Mane. Another remix features Trae, Ludacris, Lil' Wayne, Rick Ross & Twista. Many rappers have recorded verses over the instrumental, such as Lil Wayne for his mixtape No Ceilings, Ludacris on The Conjure Mixtape: A Hustler's Spirit, Fabolous on There Is No Competition 2 (The Funeral Service), Rock City on their P.T.F.A.O. (Empire Strikes Back) mixtape (on the mixtape it was called "Let's Do That") and Young Jeezy on his mixtape 1,000 Grams Vol. 1. A Lil' Kim verse over the instrumental recently leaked to the internet, and was supposed to be part of a female remix of the song that never materialized. Another freestyle was made by rapper Brisco verbally attacking Waka Flocka.

=== Music video for remix ===
The video for the official remix features Diddy and Rick Ross but not Gucci Mane, nor his verse due to Gucci serving a prison sentence at the time.

== Chart performance ==
On the week ending February 27, 2010, "O Let's Do It" debuted at No. 95 on the Billboard Hot 100 and peaked at No. 62. The song reached No. 1 on the Billboard Heat Seekers chart.

== Charts ==
=== Weekly charts ===
Chart (2010)	Peak position
US Billboard Hot 100	62
US Hot R&B/Hip-Hop Songs (Billboard)	12
US Hot Rap Songs (Billboard)	7
US Radio Songs (Billboard)	55
US Rhythmic Airplay (Billboard)	31

=== Year-end charts ===
Chart (2010)	Position
US Hot R&B/Hip-Hop Songs (Billboard)	48
