= No Hands =

2010 single by Waka Flocka Flame

Single by Waka Flocka Flame featuring Roscoe Dash and Wale

from the album Flockaveli
- Released: August 17, 2010
- Recorded: 2009–2010
- Genre: Southern hip-hop
- Length: 4:22
- Label: 1017 Brick Squad; Warner Bros.; Asylum
- Songwriters: Juaquin Malphurs; Jeffery Lee Johnson Jr.; Olubowale Akintimehin; Christopher Gholson
- Producer: Drumma Boy

Waka Flocka Flame singles chronology
"Hard in da Paint" (2010)	"No Hands" (2010)	"Grove St. Party" (2011)

Roscoe Dash singles chronology
"My Own Step" (2010)	"No Hands" (2010)	"Haters" (2011)

Wale singles chronology
"Pretty Girls" (2009)	"No Hands" (2010)	"That Way" (2011)

Music video
- "No Hands" on YouTube

"No Hands" is a song by American rapper Waka Flocka Flame featuring fellow American rappers Roscoe Dash and Wale from the former's debut studio album, Flockaveli (2010). It was written by the artists alongside producer Drumma Boy. It was leaked in May 2010 before it was officially released in August. The single entered the Billboard Hot 100 chart at number 45 and peaked at number 13.

On July 20, 2023, the song was certified diamond by RIAA selling over 10 million copies, his first diamond certification and one of the best-selling rap songs of all-time. The song has since come to be regarded as Waka's signature song.

== Background ==
According to Spin, the song finds each performer emceeing a strip club environment while intoxicated.

== Music video ==
The music video was directed by Motion Family and was released on August 17, 2010. DJ Drama made a cameo appearance in the video.

== Remixes ==
T-Pain made a remix titled "No Hands (T-Mix)". Chamillionaire made a freestyle to the beat titled "After the Super Bowl". R&B girl group RichGirl created a remix to the song, released on their Fall in Love with RichGirl mixtape, in which member Brave raps. In 2011, Cold Blank released a remix titled "No Hands – Cold Blank's Dirty Radio Mix". British singer Neon Hitch uploaded a cover version of the song to her official YouTube page in September 2011. A remix was made featuring Japanese pop star Kyary Pamyu Pamyu's "Pon Pon Pon". Another remix, titled "No Handz", was created by CRNKN and uploaded to the Trap City YouTube channel on December 25, 2012.

== Charts ==
=== Weekly charts ===
Chart (2010–2011)	Peak position
US Billboard Hot 100	13
US Hot R&B/Hip-Hop Songs (Billboard)	2
US Hot Rap Songs (Billboard)	1
US Pop Airplay (Billboard)	28
US Rhythmic Airplay (Billboard)	3

=== Year-end charts ===
Chart (2010)	Position
US Hot R&B/Hip-Hop Songs (Billboard)	56

Chart (2011)	Position
US Billboard Hot 100	45
US Hot R&B/Hip-Hop Songs (Billboard)	6
US Rhythmic (Billboard)	17

== Certifications ==
Region	Certification	Certified units/sales
New Zealand (RMNZ)	2× Platinum	60,000^{‡}
United Kingdom (BPI)	Silver	200,000^{‡}
United States (RIAA)	Diamond	10,000,000^{‡}
^{‡} Sales+streaming figures based on certification alone.

== See also ==
- List of highest-certified digital singles in the United States
