= Flockaveli =

Studio album by Waka Flocka Flame
- Released: October 5, 2010
- Recorded: 2008–2010
- Studio: Next Level Studios, Houston; NightBird Recording Studios, West Hollywood; S-Line Ent., Atlanta
- Genre: Crunk; gangsta rap
- Length: 72:00
- Label: 1017 Brick Squad; Asylum; Warner Bros.; WMGreen
- Producer: Waka Flocka Flame (exec.); Debra Antney (exec.); Tay Beatz (also exec.); Orlando McGhee (also exec.); Kevin "Coach K" Lee (also exec.); Kevin Black (also exec.); Cedric "Yayo" Herbert; Drumma Boy; Joey French; Lex Luger; Lil Jon; L-Don Beats; NIKO; Prince Productions; Purps; Southside

Waka Flocka Flame chronology
Flockaveli (2010)	Ferrari Boyz (2011)

Singles from Flockaveli
- 1. "O Let's Do It" Released: April 14, 2009; 2. "Hard in da Paint" Released: June 15, 2010; 3. "No Hands" Released: August 17, 2010; 4. "Grove St. Party" Released: February 15, 2011

Flockaveli is the debut studio album by American rapper Waka Flocka Flame. It was released through 1017 Brick Squad, Asylum, and Warner Bros. Records on October 5, 2010. The title of the album is a portmanteau of Waka Flocka Flame's name and that of the Italian political theorist Machiavelli, and was inspired by fellow American rapper Tupac Shakur, whose final stage name and pseudonym before his death was Makaveli. The album was recorded at Next Level Studios in Houston, NightBird Recording Studios in West Hollywood, and S-Line Ent. in Atlanta.

Upon its release, Flockaveli received generally positive reviews from critics, who complimented its musical intensity, brazen lyrics, and gangsta rap ethos. The album debuted at number 6 on the Billboard 200, with first-week sales of 37,000 copies in the United States. As of August 15, 2011, the album sold 400,000 copies in the United States.

== Music and lyrics ==
Flockaveli is a crunk album. It was primarily produced by Lex Luger, whose bombastic, grimly-programmed production incorporates drill 'n' bass 808 trills, bass kicks, hand claps, confrontational beats, dense synthesizers, and shifting sub-bass layers. Waka Flocka Flame's unrefined street raps feature constant ad libs. According to Pitchfork Media's David Drake, the songs reduce gangsta rap to its archetypical themes: "hypermasculine children of the drug trade, reckless fatalism, intensity, and physicality ... Waka's aggression is the survivalist reaction of the powerless, directed toward the threats of the immediate environment."

== Singles ==
The album's lead single, titled "O Let's Do It" was released on April 14, 2009. The song features guest appearances from a fellow American rapper Cap, with production by L-Don Beatz. The song peaked at number 62 on the US Billboard Hot 100. The remix to "O Let's Do It" was released, from which features guest appearances from fellow American rappers Diddy, Rick Ross, and Gucci Mane.

The album's second single, titled "Hard in da Paint" was released on May 13, 2010. The song was produced by Lex Luger. In July 2010, a music video for the song was released. The remix to "Hard in da Paint" was released, from which features guest appearances from American singer Ciara and fellow American rapper Gucci Mane.

The album's third single, titled "No Hands" was released on August 17, 2010. The song features guest appearances from fellow American rappers Roscoe Dash and Wale, with production by Drumma Boy. The song peaked at number 13 on the Billboard Hot 100, making it his highest-charting single in the United States. It is his best-selling single of all time, being a certified diamond by Recording Industry Association of America (RIAA).

The album's fourth and final single, "Grove St. Party" was released on February 15, 2011. The song features a guest appearance from fellow American rapper Kebo Gotti, with its production by Lex Luger. The song has charted at number 74 on the US Billboard Hot 100.

=== Other songs ===
There are also music videos for the songs such as "Snake in the Grass" (featuring Cartier Kitten), "Bustin' at Em", "For My Dawgs", and "Live By the Gun" (featuring Ra Diggs and Uncle Murda.) On October 18, 2010, Waka Flocka Flame performed "Smoke, Drank" live on high-definition TV at the Roxy Theatre in West Hollywood.

== Release and reception ==
Professional ratings
Aggregate scores
Source	Rating
Metacritic	75/100
Review scores
Source	Rating
AllMusic	3/5 stars
NME	9/10
Pitchfork	8.0/10
PopMatters	6/10
RapReviews	7.5/10
Rolling Stone	3.5/5 stars
Spin	7/10

Flockaveli was released by Asylum Records on October 5, 2010. It debuted at number 6 on the US Billboard 200, with first-week sales of 37,000 copies in the United States. As of August 15, 2011, the album has sold 285,000 copies, according to Nielsen SoundScan.

Flockaveli received generally positive reviews from critics. At Metacritic, which assigns a normalized rating out of 100 to reviews from mainstream publications, the album received an average score of 75, based on 9 reviews. Jaimie Hodgson from NME commented that the album's songs "showcase a masterclass in reductionism; juggernauts of hulking, bruising, brick-to-skull intensity." BBC Music's Louis Pattison praised Waka Flocka Flame's "cold charisma", writing that "it's channelled successfully here, a presence that permeates Flockaveli utterly." Ben Detrick of Spin complimented its "unforgiving crush of unveiled threats over ricocheting drums and choleric synths", and called Waka "more agitator than rapper—imagine DJ Kool as an unhinged goon with a fetish for brawling and gunfire." Sean Fennessey of The Village Voice called producer Lex Luger "a force whose tinnitus-inducing tracks demand replay" and concluded, "Ultimately, the inflammatory Waka is an avatar for a new rap economy: few words delivered with force, with an eye to the stage and the check that arrives with it." Pitchfork critic David Drake described it as "a furious torrent of gangsta rap Id," and praised Waka for giving the album its "frenetic intensity".

Rolling Stone writer Jody Rosen was less impressed and found Waka Flocka Flame's skills "negligible." Patrick Taylor of RapReviews called Waka "a blunt instrument that beats you into submission", and stated, "On an intellectual level, I don't like Flockaveli. The lyrics are simplistic and goonish. The music is effective but all sounds the same. If I was looking for an example of what hip-hop should be, it's not Waka Flocka Flame. On a gut level, though, Flockaveli works. It's morally questionable, but it hits hard". David Amidon from PopMatters described it as "a producer classic littered with verses so whack they become endearing in their special way", adding that Luger "pulls that special kind of synergy unique to hip-hop out of [Waka] again and again." Amidon wrote of its cultural significance, "This is a very specific album intended for a specific audience: downtrodden, powerless, forever seeking payment, pussy and freedom from the powers that be but in the process of accepting they may never find that experience. This is strictly hood music ... it's been a very long time since a hip-hop release felt like it truly didn't give a fuck about anything but its local community while pushing its genre forward as much as possible."

In 2012, Complex named the album one of the classic albums of the last decade. In 2014, Billboard called the single "No Hands" the ninth most successful song in the 25-year history of their Hot Rap Songs chart.

On September 30, 2025, Pitchfork released their list of the top 100 best rap albums of all time, on which Flockaveli was ranked 92nd.

== Track listing ==
No.	Title	Writer(s)	Producer(s)	Length
1.	"Bustin' at 'Em"	Juaquin Malphurs; Lexus Lewis; Joshua Luellen	Lex Luger; Southside	4:03
2.	"Hard in da Paint"	Malphurs	Lex Luger	4:06
3.	"TTG (Trained to Go)" (featuring French Montana, YG Hootie, Joe Moses, Suge Gotti, and Baby Bomb)	Malphurs; Karim Kharbouch; Lamar Joseph; Joe Moses; Angelo Walker; Lewis	Lex Luger	5:05
4.	"Bang" (featuring YG Hootie and Slim Dunkin)	Malphurs; Joseph; Mario Hamilton; Lewis	Lex Luger	4:23
5.	"No Hands" (featuring Roscoe Dash and Wale)	Malphurs; Jeffery Johnson; Olubowale Akintimehin; Christopher Gholson	Drumma Boy	4:22
6.	"Bricksquad" (featuring Gudda Gudda)	Malphurs; Carl Lilly; Lewis	Lex Luger	3:57
7.	"Fuck the Club Up" (featuring Pastor Troy and Slim Dunkin)	Malphurs; Hamilton; Micah Troy; Luellen	Southside	4:39
8.	"Homies" (featuring YG Hootie, Popa Smurf, and Ice Burgandy)	Malphurs; Joseph; John Benoic; Jabari Hechavarria; Amir Motamedi; Nathaniel Castera	Prince N. Purps	4:54
9.	"Grove St. Party" (featuring Kebo Gotti)	Malphurs; Dankivion Chatman; Lewis	Lex Luger	4:10
10.	"O Let's Do It" (featuring Cap)	Malphurs; Donovan Winters	L-Don	4:08
11.	"Karma" (featuring YG Hootie and Popa Smurf)	Malphurs; Joseph; Benoic; Hamilton; Lewis	Lex Luger	3:52
12.	"Live by the Gun" (featuring Ra Diggs and Uncle Murda)	Malphurs; Ra Diggs; Leonard Grant; Lewis	Lex Luger	4:09
13.	"For My Dawgs"	Malphurs; Cedric Herbert	Cedric "Yayo" Herbert	3:21
14.	"G-Check" (featuring YG Hootie, Bo Deal, and Joe Moses)	Malphurs; Joseph; Billy Deal; Moses; Lewis	Lex Luger	4:18
15.	"Snake in the Grass" (featuring Cartier Kitten)	Malphurs; Lauren Carter; Lewis	Lex Luger	2:58
16.	"Smoke, Drank" (featuring Mouse, Kebo Gotti and Bo Deal)	Malphurs; Deal; Anthony Frelix; Chatman; Niko; Jonathan Smith	NIKO; Lil Jon	4:32
17.	"Fuck This Industry"	Malphurs; Lewis	Lex Luger	5:09
18.	"Rumors" (Bonus track)	Malphurs; Joey French	Joey French	3:29
19.	"Gun Sounds" (Bonus track)	Malphurs; Luellen	Southside	3:36

== Personnel ==
Credits for Flockaveli adapted from AllMusic.

- Debra Antney – A&R, executive producer
- Russell Dreyer – inside photo
- Drumma Boy – producer
- Cedric "Yayo" Herbert – producer
- Darryl "Big Dee" Johnson – A&R
- Liza Joseph – A&R
- L Don – producer
- Colin Leonard – mastering
- Lexus "Lex Luger" Lewis – producer
- Lil Jon – producer
- Joshua "Southside" Luellen – producer
- Juaquin Malphurs AKA Waka Flocka Flame – executive producer, A&R
- Amir Motamedi AKA Prince – producer
- Nathaniel Caserta AKA Purps – producer
- Mike Rev – cover design
- TaVon Sampson – art direction, design
- Sharod Simpson – cover photo
- Nigel Talley – A&R
- Carolyn Tracey – package production
- Finis "KY" White – engineer, mixing

== Charts ==
=== Weekly charts ===
Chart (2010)	Peak position
US Billboard 200	6
US Top R&B/Hip-Hop Albums (Billboard)	2
US Top Rap Albums (Billboard)	2

=== Year-end charts ===
Chart (2010)	Position
US Top R&B/Hip-Hop Albums (Billboard)	60
Chart (2011)	Position
US Billboard 200	189
US Top R&B/Hip-Hop Albums (Billboard)	39
