= Lex Luger (music producer) =

American record producer (born 1991)

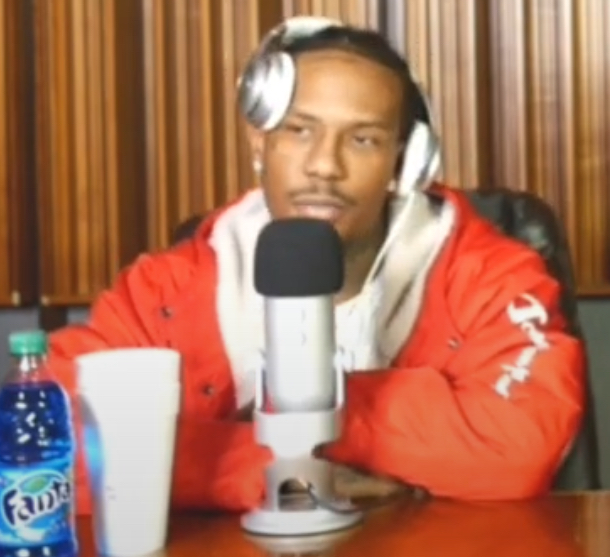
- Lex Luger in 2021

Background information
- Born: Lexus Arnel Lewis; March 6, 1991 (age 35); Suffolk, Virginia, U.S.
- Origin: Atlanta, Georgia, U.S.
- Genres: Hip hop; trap; R&B; EDM
- Occupations: Record producer; songwriter
- Years active: 2008−present
- Labels: 1017 Brick Squad; Fool's Gold; Warpath; TMOG

Lexus Arnel Lewis (born March 6, 1991), professionally known as Lex Luger, is an American record producer. His stage name is an homage to the former WCW/WWF professional wrestler of the same name. He co-founded the American hip hop production team 808 Mafia with Southside. He is a member of the hip hop production duo Low Pros with A-Trak, and the VABP (Virginia Boyz Productionz), a hip hop group that he founded in high school.

== Career ==
=== Early life and career beginnings ===
Growing up, Luger played percussion for his church and drummed in church bands. His first introduction to music was playing drums for a number of bands at his local church where he learned about beats, measures, BPMS and bars using a DJ set where he took instrumentals and mixed them with acapellas. He then moved on to making music on the PlayStation game MTV Music Generator 3, where he started working with turntables. When Luger eventually saved enough money for an Akai MPC 2500 and established the VABP (Virginia Boyz Productionz) production crew with his high school friends, Luger began to try his hand at making high quality industry hip hop beats. After purchasing an MPC 2000 from his uncle, his friend and now collaborator Urboyblack brought Luger an unlicensed copy of FL Studio. He has also incorporated music production workstations such as Maschine and Pro Tools.

Initially spending long days experimenting with Fruity Loops and working every day after school and all day every weekend wasn't enough to jump-start Luger's production career. He dropped out of King's Fork High School after the 10th grade to further hone his music production talents when he realized that he was able to produce song-length instrumentals quickly. Putting hours into honing his craft, Luger dramatically increased his musical output after he found that he could knock out at least 10 beats a day. He heard about independent music artists gaining exposure through Myspace and started posting music there. Around late 2008, he began cold-emailing his beats to various rappers and posting instrumentals on his Myspace page, hoping to gain further exposure in the hip hop industry. In 2009, a then unknown rapper by the name of Waka Flocka Flame began e-mailing him back. The two later built a relationship on Myspace when Luger began sending Waka beats once every few days.

=== 2009–2013: rise to fame ===
Waka expressed interest in Luger's production style when he requested a particularly vicious beat that he wanted to rap over. Luger sent Waka 40 beats, three of which ended up on Waka's 2009 Salute Me or Shoot Me 2 mixtape. Waka later requested more from Luger, to which he responded with hundreds more, and eventually Waka Flocka Flame flew him out to Atlanta to collaborate with him. Spending months sequestered in a basement with no internet access in Atlanta working with Waka Flocka Flame, Luger laid much of the production groundwork for Waka's debut album. Not knowing the future of his career, Luger contemplated taking a second job stacking boxes in a warehouse to support his production career. Waka later gained fame and was eventually signed to Bricksquad when his song "O Let's Do It" became a hit.

Waka Flocka Flame's "Hard in the Paint" was Luger's first instrumental to hit the radio waves and became a hit by May 2010. Luger was in Atlanta at the time when he first heard the song playing on the radio. While in Atlanta, Luger got a phone call from Chicago rapper and record producer Kanye West, although he did not realize who he was talking to for two hours. After realizing who it was, Luger agreed to fly to New York City to work with him. He eventually created eight backing beats for West's use, including the beat that eventually became the single H•A•M as well as the bonus cut "See Me Now" for West's 2010 album My Beautiful Dark Twisted Fantasy. Luger also got a request from Spiff of SpiffTV who contacted him to get the instrumental track of "Hard In The Paint" that eventually led Luger to build a relationship with Rick Ross as Ross wanted to do a remix for the song. This led Luger to build a relationship with Rick Ross for whom he later produced B.M.F. (Blowin' Money Fast) and MC Hammer for Ross's 2010 album Teflon Don. After working with Ross, Luger achieved a career boost when he began receiving an increase in numbers of followers on Twitter. By June 2010, Luger had landed production placements from rappers Ace Hood, Soulja Boy, Chingy, Sean Garrett, and Fabolous.

As Luger's sound drifted upstream from the mixtape circuit to the mainstream hip hop, it caught the ear of numerous rappers who requested his jackhammer drum and spooky trap synth production style. He produced tracks for a number of popular rappers, including Rick Ross's Teflon Don, Waka Flocka Flame's Flockaveli, Slim Thug's Tha Thug Show and Kanye West and Jay-Z's Watch the Throne. He then worked with a number of other popular rap artists, including Wiz Khalifa, Big Sean, Wale, Fabolous, Juicy J, Soulja Boy, Snoop Dogg and 2 Chainz as well as producing songs for a number of street famous rappers such as Fat Trel, Lil Scrappy and OJ Da Juiceman. Following his success with Waka Flocka Flame and Rick Ross, Luger began building a relationship with Juicy J in late 2010, citing him as a musical influence as well as a music-industry adviser. Juicy J eventually took Luger under his wing and the two eventually collaborated on two mixtapes with Juicy J leveraging Luger a career boost as well as to generate buzz to further get Luger's name in the hip hop industry. Luger went on to produce more than 200 songs throughout 2010 and 2011, fueling hit songs by a number of popular rappers as well as number of songs featured on an array of street and underground hip hop mixtapes.

Luger was initially affiliated with fellow Brick Squad producer Southside. The two of them formed the production team 808 Mafia in 2010, though he left the group the following year. During the same year at the 2011 BET Hip Hop Awards, Luger won the award for Producer of the Year.

=== 2014–present: International touring, instrumental album and drug addiction ===
In February 2014, Luger joined forces with Canadian DJ/producer A-Trak under the moniker Low Pros, with the intention of releasing a collaborative project. Their first release was "Jack Tripper", a drug-addled trap song featuring Brick Squad affiliates PeeWee Longway and Young Thug, who had just risen to popularity at the time due to the success of his 2013 singles "Stoner" and "Danny Glover".

In late 2014, Luger started touring as a live act. He signed with agent Wilcox Weaver at Oklahoma City- and Los Angeles-based Warpath Group in September 2014 for international tour bookings. In January 2015, he signed to EXYT Agency for European and Asian tour bookings. Luger has played all over the world with his DJ, Kino Beats. He has had solid success, selling thousands of tickets across the globe as he sold out an entire European tour in May 2015.

On June 27, 2015, Luger headlined the fifth annual EpicFest Hip Hop Festival in Richmond, Virginia.

On March 22, 2016, Luger released his first full-length instrumental album. The project features his DJ and collaborator KinoBeats as well as his V.A.B.P. collaborators from his early production days HighDefRazajah, UrBoyBlack and Trama.

Luger opened up about his seven-year battle with drug addiction in an interview with DJ Smallz Eyes in September 2018. He stated that he was taking the prescription medication Xanax daily and was also addicted to ecstasy and marijuana, and that he was hospitalized four times, with one incident being nearly fatal. He claimed that he could not distinguish his perceptions from reality for four days. Luger finally decided to get clean with help from rehab. He has been sober from all substances except alcohol since 2017.

== Production style and influences ==
Luger uses the digital audio workstation FL Studio, along with custom VST plugins, to compose his beats. He has also incorporated music production workstations such as Maschine and Pro Tools. He has become known for using his signature electronic sounding build-up effect throughout his productions. He cites producers Dr. Dre, Shawty Redd, D. Rich, Drumma Boy, Jazze Pha, hip hop production duo The Heatmakerz, rapper Juicy J and his former group Three Six Mafia, and Harlem rap group The Diplomats as his musical influences. He describes the creative process of composing his beats as coming from his inner "pain" bringing out stress and pouring his heart out.

Luger is known for his strong adherence to Atlanta's trap sound making use of the Roland TR-808 kick drum, ominous synth lines, and threatening ad-libs. His austere, jackhammer, and utilitarian orchestral trap sound has been well known for his heavy use of hard-hitting 808 kick drums; crisp snare drums; frantic synthesizers; spooky, sinister, and rhythmic Richard Wagner- and Danny Elfman-like bombastic ominous orchestration of synthesized brass, stringed, woodwind, and keyboard instruments commonly incorporated throughout his productions. Luger is known for his musical confluence of combining bombastic orchestral instruments, spooky synths with urban street hip hop sounds. Since his entrance into the hip hop industry, he produces with a more diverse approach further incorporating pop, R&B, and electronic dance as a creative deviation from his traditional trap sound into his production repertoire.

His stage name was inspired by professional wrestler Lex Luger as well as the Luger pistol.

== Discography ==
Studio album

- 2016: The Lex Luger Experience: The Tour Vol. 1

Collaboration albums

- 2014: Low Pros EP 1 (with A-Trak)
- 2016: 500 Grams (with Ricky Hil)
- 2016: 1804 (with Malcolm Anthony)
- 2016: GOT INSTRUMENTALS x GC54PROD 2 (with GC54PROD)
- 2017: GOT INSTRUMENTALS x GC54PROD 4 (with GC54PROD)
- 2018: GOT INSTRUMENTALS x GC54PROD 6 (with GC54PROD)
- 2021: Generation Scam (with Teejayx6)
- 2023: THE PROFESSIONALS (with GC54PROD)

== Awards and nominations ==
Year	Awards	Category	Recipient	Result
2011	BET Hip Hop Awards	Producer of the Year	Lex Luger	Won
