= Waka Flocka Flame =

American rapper (born 1986)

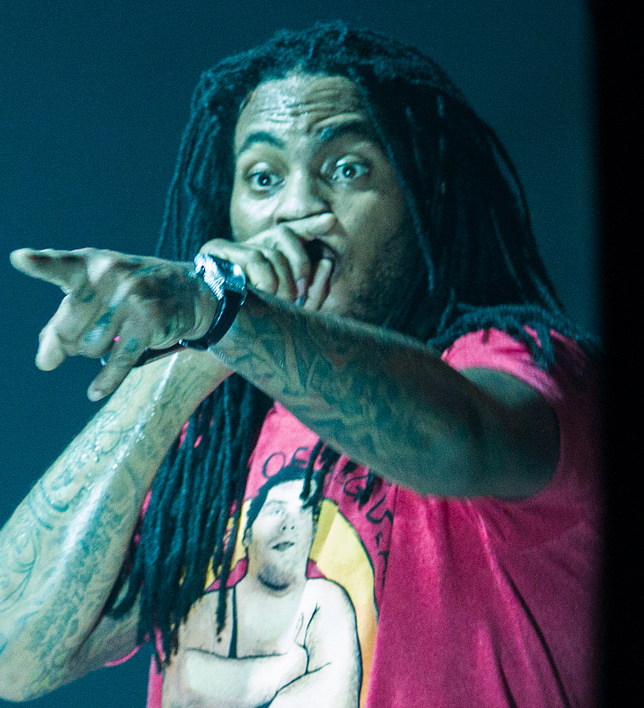
- Waka Flocka Flame performing in 2016

Background information
- Born: Juaquin James Malphurs; May 31, 1986 (age 40); New York City, U.S.
- Origin: Riverdale, Georgia, U.S.
- Genres: Southern hip hop; trap
- Occupations: Rapper; songwriter
- Works: Waka Flocka Flame discography
- Years active: 2008–present
- Labels: 36 Brick House; Dusk Til Dawn; E1; Brick Squad Monopoly; 1017 Brick Squad; Asylum; Warner Bros.; RBC; Mizay; So Icey
- Spouse: Tammy Rivera (m. 2014; div. 2022)
- Website: wakaflocka.com

Juaquin James Malphurs (born May 31, 1986), known professionally as Waka Flocka Flame, is an American rapper. He first became known for his 2009 single "O Let's Do It", which entered the Billboard Hot 100 and led him to sign with Gucci Mane's 1017 Records, an imprint of Warner Records, that same year. His 2010 follow-up single, "No Hands" (featuring Roscoe Dash and Wale), reached number 13 on the chart and received diamond certification by the Recording Industry Association of America (RIAA). Both songs, along with "Hard in da Paint" and "Grove St. Party" (featuring Kebo Gotti), preceded the release of his debut studio album Flockaveli (2010), which peaked at number six on the Billboard 200. His second studio album, Triple F Life: Friends, Fans & Family (2012) peaked at number ten on the chart and was supported by the singles "Round of Applause" (featuring Drake), "I Don't Really Care" (featuring Trey Songz) and "Get Low" (featuring Tyga, Nicki Minaj and Flo Rida).

== Early life ==
Malphurs was born in South Jamaica, Queens, New York City. His family ultimately settled in Riverdale, Georgia. His mother, Debra Antney, is rapper Gucci Mane's former manager and the CEO of So Icey/Mizay Entertainment. The name "Waka" was given to him by his cousin, after the Muppets character Fozzie Bear's catchphrase, "Wocka Wocka". The name "Flocka Flame" was given to him by Gucci Mane, whom he has known since 2005 when he was 19.

== Career ==
=== 2009–2010: Flockaveli ===
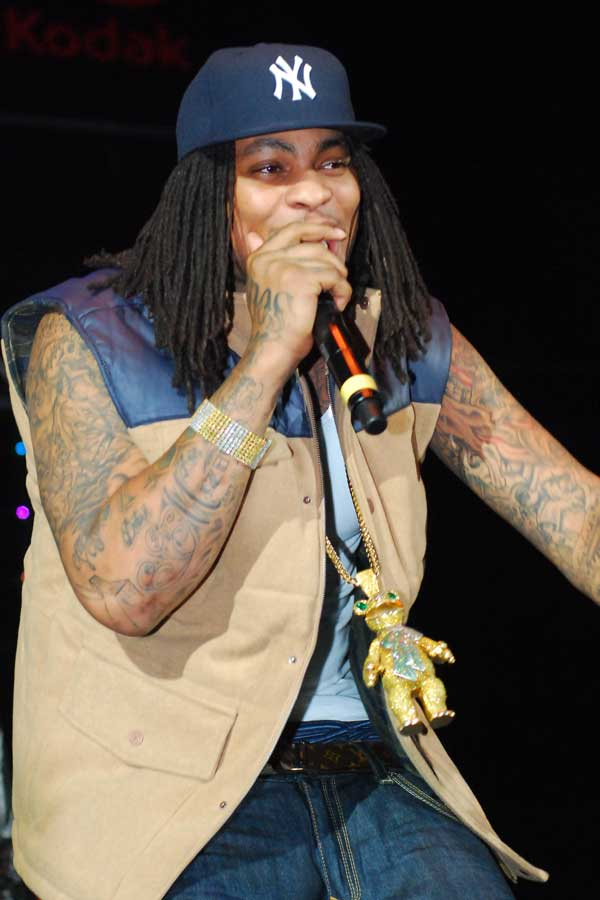
Waka Flocka Flame in 2010

In January 2009, Malphurs released his debut mixtape, Salute Me or Shoot Me. The mixtape contained the song "O Let's Do It", which was released as a commercial single in April of that year. After which, the song was re-recorded and the guest performer was changed. The song was produced by L-Don Beatz. By November 2009, he was signed to Gucci Mane's record label 1017 Records, along with fellow Georgia-based rapper OJ Da Juiceman, his cousin Frenchie, and his brother Wooh Da Kid. On January 19, 2010, Malphurs was shot and robbed at a car wash in his Atlanta hometown; a bullet went through his right arm. Following this, "O Let's Do It" debuted at number 95 on the Billboard Hot 100 in February 2010, and peaked at number 62 on the chart by April. Throughout that year, he released the singles "Hard In Da Paint", "Grove St. Party", and "No Hands". The latter two entered the Billboard Hot 100—the latter at number 13—while each promoted the release of his debut studio album, Flockaveli on October 1, 2010. The album debuted at number six on the US Billboard 200 and received positive critical reception. Its title was inspired by Tupac Shakur, whose final stage name and pseudonym before his death was Makaveli. Malphurs was listed at number eight on MTV's Hottest MCs in the Game Annual List in 2010.

Gucci Mane fired Malphurs' mother, Debra as his manager. There was initially no animosity between the two rappers due to this event. In an MTV interview, Malphurs affirmed that their relationship was, at the time, in good standing despite not being on speaking terms. In early September, Gucci Mane attended Malphurs' Flockaveli listening party in support of the artist.

=== 2011–2012: Ferrari Boyz and Triple F Life: Friends, Fans & Family ===
In 2011, Malphurs posed for a nude but not explicit promotional photo for PETA, to boycott killing animals and wearing fur. The picture reads "ink not mink". Malphurs released several mixtapes in 2011, including Salute Me or Shoot Me 3, Benjamin Flocka and his last Twin Towers 2 (No Fly Zone) with fellow rapper Slim Dunkin. On August 9, 2011, his collaborative album with Gucci Mane, Ferrari Boyz was released. The first single was "She Be Puttin On", featuring Slim Dunkin, who was fatally shot the following year.

"Round of Applause", featuring Canadian rapper Drake, was released on October 14, 2011 as the first single from his second studio album, Triple F Life: Friends, Fans & Family. It was produced by frequent collaborator, Lex Luger. The album was released on June 8, 2012 and saw a critical and commercial decline from his debut.

=== 2013–present: Flockaveli 2 ===
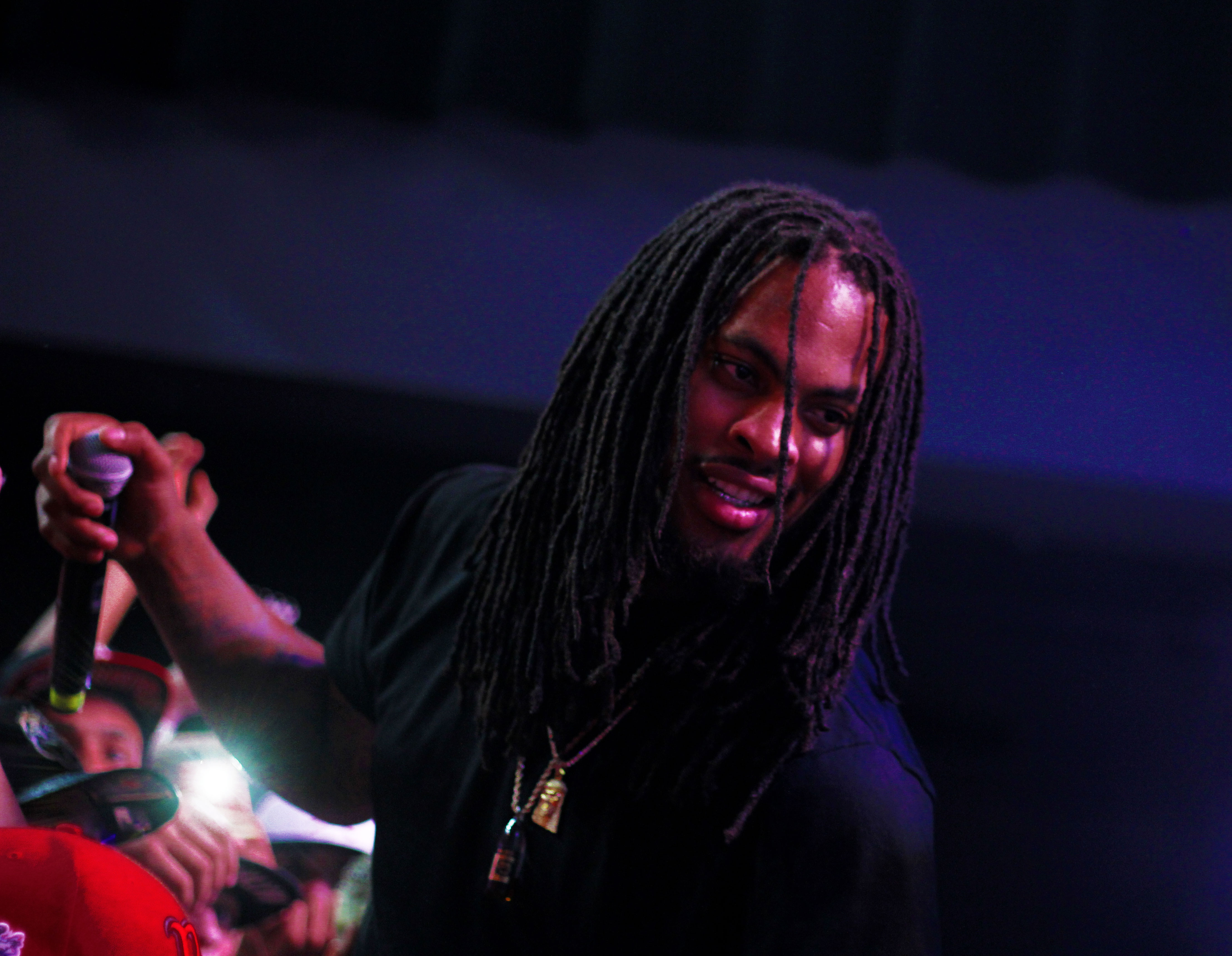
Waka Flocka Flame in 2014

On January 22, 2013, Malphurs announced that he had completed his third studio album, titled Flockaveli 2, featuring guest appearances by Timbaland and Wyclef Jean. On May 21, 2013, he gave a release date of October 5, 2013; in June, he gave a new date of January 2014. In July 2014, he named producers on the album; in November the front cover art was released. In January 2020, he announced that he'd release his last album that year; Flockaveli 2 was not released in 2020.

In February 2013, he released the mixtape DuFlocka Rant 2, with guest appearances by Gucci Mane, Lil Wayne, French Montana, Ace Hood and Young Scooter. A sequel followed in May, DuFlocka Rant: Halftime Show, featuring fellow Southern rapper T.I. In October, he released a third mixtape, From Roaches to Rollies.

In 2014, he released two mixtapes, Re-Up in March and I Can't Rap Vol. 1 in July. Also in July, he announced an EDM album, Turn Up God, to be released later in the year; it was not.

In 2014, Malphurs appeared in the third season of the VH1 show Love & Hip Hop: Atlanta. The show loosely follows events in the life of Waka Flocka and his wife, Tammy Rivera.

On March 2, 2015, Malphurs released a collaboration mixtape with DJ Whoo Kid, The Turn Up Godz Tour, with guest appearances from Future, Howard Stern, Machine Gun Kelly, Offset, Cash Out, Bobby V, Gucci Mane, Tony Yayo, and Watch The Duck. On April 1, 2015, Malphurs released the mixtape Salute Me Or Shoot Me 5, with guest appearances from Future, Yo Gotti and Juvenile. Malphurs released his Flockaveli 1.5 mixtape on November 25, 2015.

In April 2015, Malphurs hosted a collaborative campaign with Rolling Stone magazine in which he pretended to run for president. Although he was seven years too young to be considered president, the campaign, directed by Sam Lipman-Stern of Live from the Streets, went viral and was picked up by media outlets such as CNN, Los Angeles Times, and The Washington Post, among others.

== Artistry ==
Lyrically, Malphurs' music has been described as "celebratory, aggressive, hedonistic, rebellious [and] silly". The personality Malphurs employs has been described as "rowdy".

Despite it being his profession, Malphurs has frequently condemned his rapping ability. He has released a series of mixtapes titled I Can't Rap, and often discredits any form of esteem in his lyrics. In 2023, he referred to himself as a "fucked up rapper", deeming that his choice in production often compensated for this.

== Feud with Gucci Mane ==
On March 15, 2013, Gucci Mane announced that frequent collaborator and close friend Waka Flocka Flame was "dropped" from 1017 Brick Squad Records. The two rappers proceeded to throw insults back and forth on Twitter. Though it was reported that Gucci's Twitter account was hacked, Waka stated, "Dont let da media fool u. This shit real Shawty." On March 27, 2013, during an MTV Jams interview with Sway Calloway, Waka explained that he would never do music nor business with Gucci ever again. Neither of the rappers have explained where the controversy originated from. Waka has stated, "I guess we both be at the finish line we just going our own routes. That's all I can say. What's the reason? Sometimes it's none of your fuckin' business what's the reason. Just understand two men went they own ways but it's no problem." In October 2013, Waka Flocka released a diss track towards Gucci Mane titled "Ice Cream".

On November 19, 2013, it was revealed Gucci Mane had filed a lawsuit against Waka Flocka Flame, Waka's mother Debra Antney, OJ Da Juiceman, rapper Khia Stone and producer Zaytoven. The lawsuit accuses the parties of fraud, racketeering, and breach of contract. According to Gucci Mane, Waka's mother Antney took control of his 1017 Brick Squad Records, LLC., without permission, and used it to create three separate offshoot labels. Gucci also accused the parties in the lawsuit of withholding royalties and inflating the cost of label expenditures. In his lawsuit, Gucci Mane also says that Antney took more than the typical 20 percent management fee. Gucci Mane also alleges that Antney's actions led to his having money and tax problems.

Waka Flocka Flame would post a tweet on September 20, 2014, to his verified Twitter account that included an old picture of himself and Gucci Mane with the caption "… #NoBeef ", confirming that the two had buried the hatchet.

In a February 2017 BBC Radio interview, Waka Flocka addressed his relationship with Gucci Mane, questioning his former mentor's street credibility and nixing the possibility of a Brick Squad reunion. Several days later, Waka released "Was My Dawg", a diss track aimed at Gucci Mane, with cover art featuring the other rapper's silhouette.

== Personal life ==
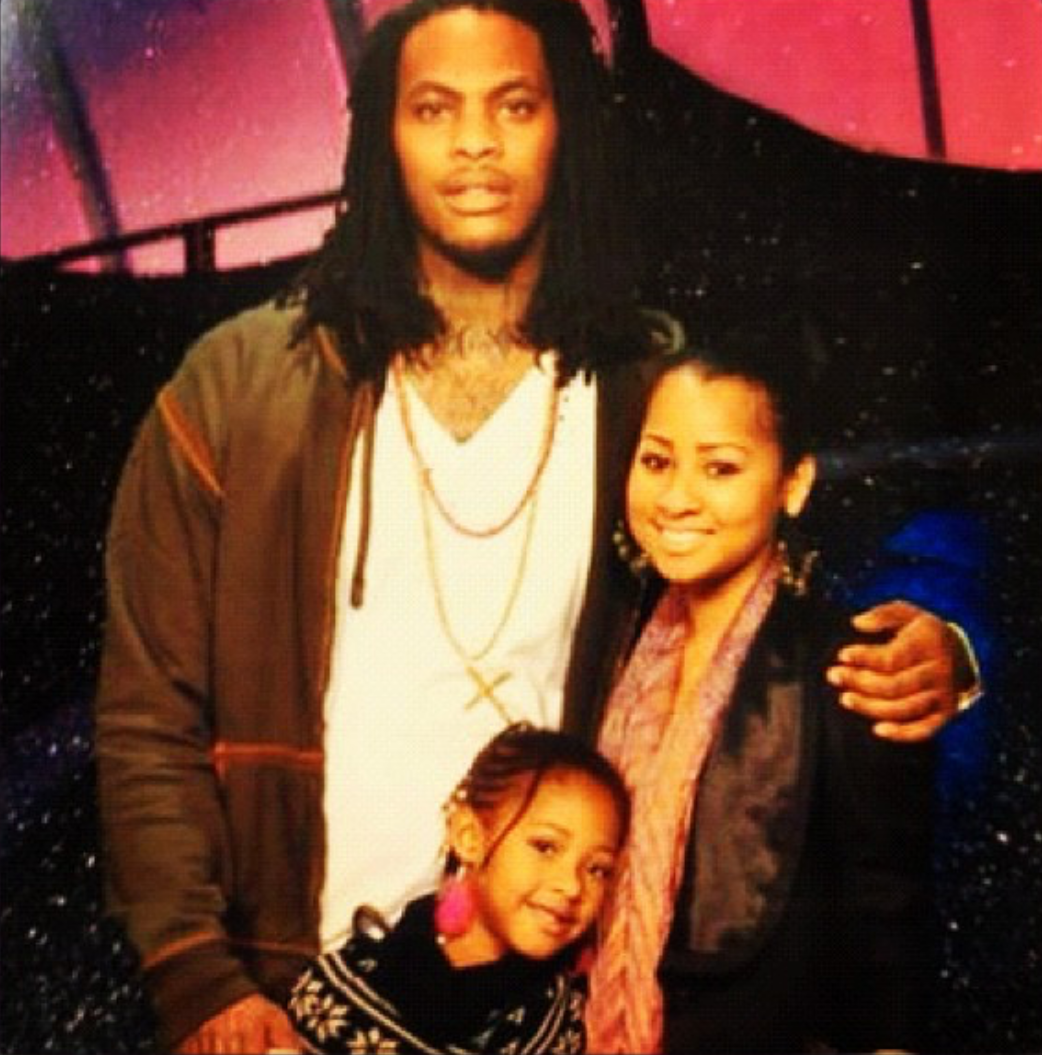
Waka Flocka with his former wife Tammy Rivera and her daughter Charlie

Malphurs is of African American, Native American, European (including Italian) and Dominican descent.

In December 2013, Malphurs' younger brother and fellow rapper KayO Redd (1987–2013) committed suicide at his home in Henry County, Georgia. On January 24, 2014, during an interview, Malphurs spoke on his brother's passing:

After that situation I detoxed for like seven days. I changed my diet. I became 85% vegan. I just felt like I had to cleanse myself... I've been through that before, so to me that's willpower because if I sit there and mope, a lot of things could go bad. That boy had a lot of stress on him. It's a lot of things that go on behind doors that people don't know about... like it's a lot of stress that come with this game. The strong survive. The family is good, though. Life goes on. That's the motto for me, life goes on. If my eyes ain't closed and I'm not breathing, I'm not hurting.

On May 25, 2014, Malphurs married actress Tammy Rivera, also becoming the stepfather to her child. They divorced in 2022.

Malphurs is a supporter of Atlanta United FC, regularly attending games in Atlanta, traveling to away games, and serving as a team ambassador.

On October 3, 2020, Malphurs received an honorary doctorate in philanthropy and humanitarianism from the Bible Institute of America Theological Seminary, credited to his charity and mental health advocacy.

On January 1, 2025, Malphurs posted a photo of himself with facial injuries stating that he had been attacked by 10 men. He then posted the following day that the previous post was fake news, criticizing the media for believing his claims.

=== Politics ===
In April 2015, Malphurs announced that he was running for president, despite the fact he was below the constitutionally required age of 35, as he was only 30 by the time of the 2016 United States presidential election. His platform included legalizing marijuana, raising the minimum hourly wage to $15, and creating better trade opportunities for school students. His other proposals included banning dogs from restaurants and making it illegal for people with shoe sizes above 13 to walk on the street. He also seemed to be dismissive of Congress, and had an anti-war stance. Former professional wrestler Ric Flair was his running mate.

Malphurs has received attention for his views on political and social issues. In addition to his humanitarianism, he has been awarded with an honorary professor degree from the Bible Institute of America. He expressed disdain for U.S. President Donald Trump in the 2016 United States presidential election but in 2020 praised Trump and expressed approval of his presidency. In 2021, the Trump administration awarded Malphurs a Lifetime Achievement Award for his work with the Chicago-based non-profit, Daughter of Destiny. He endorsed Democratic incumbent Raphael Warnock for the 2022 United States Senate election in Georgia, and formally endorsed Trump for the 2024 United States presidential election. During a July 2024 concert in Salt Lake City, Utah, Malphurs told concertgoers to leave the venue if they supported Joe Biden.

=== Legal issues ===
On January 3, 2011, Waka Flocka turned himself in to authorities in Atlanta following a previous raid on his home. He was booked on possession of marijuana, hydrocodone, possession of a firearm by a convicted felon, and violation of probation for driving on a suspended license. On January 5, 2011, he was released after posting bail.

On October 10, 2014, Waka Flocka was arrested at Hartsfield-Jackson Atlanta International Airport when a security scan turned up a loaded handgun in his luggage. He was released two hours later.

== Discography ==
Studio albums

- Flockaveli (2010)
- Triple F Life: Friends, Fans & Family (2012)

Collaborative albums

- Ferrari Boyz (with Gucci Mane) (2011)

== Filmography ==
Television
Year	Film	Role
2014	Black Dynamite	Waka Blocka Blaow
2014; 2016–2017	Love & Hip Hop: Atlanta	Supporting Role
2017	FishCenter Live	Supporting Role
2019	Marriage Boot Camp: Hip Hop Edition Season 14	Supporting Role
2019	Waka and Tammy Tie the Knot	Starring Role
2019	Growing Up Hip Hop: Atlanta Season 3	Supporting Role
2020	Waka & Tammy: What The Flocka	Starring Role

== Awards and nominations ==
Year	Awards	Category	Nominated work	Result
2010	BET Hip Hop Awards	Rookie of the Year	—N/a	Nominated
2010	BET Hip Hop Awards	Best Club Banger	"O Let's Do It"	Nominated
2011	BET Awards	Best Collaboration	"No Hands" (with Roscoe Dash and Wale)	Nominated
2011	BET Hip Hop Awards	Best Club Banger	"No Hands" (with Roscoe Dash and Wale)	Won
2015	Much Music Video Awards	EDM/Dance Video of the Year	"Beast" (with Mia Martina)	Nominated
