= Jazze Pha production discography =

The following list is a discography of production by Jazze Pha, an American hip hop record producer and recording artist from Atlanta, Georgia. It includes a list of songs produced, co-produced and remixed by year, artist, album and title.

== Singles produced ==
- 1996
  - "Sho Nuff" (Tela featuring 8Ball & MJG)
- 1997
  - "Tired of Ballin'" (Tela)
- 1999
  - "That Drama (Baby Mama)" (Jim Crow)
  - "Better Than Me" (Terry Dexter)
- 2001
  - "Area Codes" (Ludacris featuring Nate Dogg)
- 2002
  - "Sick of Being Lonely" (Field Mob)
- 2003
  - "Come Over" (Aaliyah featuring Tank)
  - "Let's Get Down" (Bow Wow featuring Birdman)
  - "Let's Get Away" (T.I. featuring Jazze Pha)
  - "Luv Me Baby" (Murphy Lee featuring Sleepy Brown & Jazze Pha)
- 2004
  - "1, 2 Step" (Ciara featuring Missy Elliott)
  - "Na-NaNa-Na" (Nelly featuring Jazze Pha)
  - "Earthquake" (Lil Wayne featuring Jazze Pha)
  - "I Wanna Thank Ya" (Angie Stone featuring Snoop Dogg)
- 2005
  - "Boogie Oogie Oogie" (Brooke Valentine Featuring Fabolous, Sonji Mickey)
  - "Incredible Feelin'" (Slim Thug featuring Jazze Pha)
  - "So What" (Field Mob featuring Ciara)
  - "Touching" (David Banner featuring Jazze Pha, Sonji Mickey)
  - "Errtime" (Nelly featuring King Jacob & Jung Tru)
  - "Nasty Girl" (The Notorious B.I.G. featuring P. Diddy, Nelly, Jagged Edge, Avery Storm, Jazze Pha & Fat Joe
- 2006
  - "I Know You Want Me" (Young Buck featuring Jazze Pha)
  - "Get Up" (Ciara featuring Chamillionaire)
  - "Unappreciated" (Cherish)
- 2007
  - "5000 Ones" (DJ Drama featuring Nelly, T.I., Yung Joc, Willie the Kid, Young Jeezy & Twista)
  - "I Know You Want Me" (Young Buck featuring Jazze Pha)
  - "He's Alive" (A Girl Called Jane)
  - "Choose You" (Nephu)
- 2008
  - "Green Light" (Mario)
- 2009
  - "So Sharp" (Mack 10 featuring Rick Ross, Lil Wayne, & Jazze Pha)
  - "Block Blockin'" (Usher)
- 2010
  - "Phone #" (Bobby V featuring Plies)
- 2012
  - "Sorry" (T.I. featuring Andre 3000)

== 1995 ==
Erick Sermon – Double or Nothing

- 15. "Man Above" (featuring Jazze Pha)

== 1996 ==
Alfonzo Hunter – Blacka Da Berry

- 08. "Groove On" (produced by Erick Sermon, co-produced by Jazze Pha)

Tela – Piece of Mind

- 03. "Tired of Ballin'"
- 07. "Sho Nuff"
- 13. "Interlude – All About the Money" (produced with Slicse Tee & Insane Wayne)

== 1997 ==
LSG – Levert.Sweat.Gill

- 09. "Let A Playa Get His Freak On" (featuring Jazze Pha)

Lil Jon & the East Side Boyz – Get Crunk, Who U Wit: Da Album

- 09. "Shawty Freak a Lil' Sumtin'" (featuring Jazze Pha)

== 1998 ==
TQ – They Never Saw Me Coming

- 03. "If the World was Mine"
- 17. "The Comeback" (featuring Daz Dillinger and Kurupt)

Ras Kass – Rasassination

- 10. "It is What It Is" (featuring Jazze Pha)

== 1999 ==
Jim Crow – Crow's Nest

- 4. "Hurry Too Much"
- 8. "One of These Days"
- 10. "That Drama (Baby Mama)"

Dave Hollister – Ghetto Hymns

- 02. "Came in the Door Pimpin'"
- 04. "Round and Round" (co-produced by Teddy Bishop)

Men of Vizion – MOV

- 01. "I Think About It" (produced with Kenneth "K-Fam" Fambro)

Too Short – Can't Stay Away

- 07. "Good Life" (featuring Jazze Pha)

Slick Rick – The Art of Storytelling

- 03. "Street Talkin'" (featuring Outkast)

Terry Dexter – Terry Dexter

- 01. "Better Than Me"

Ideal – Ideal

- 01. "Intro"
- 16. "Sexy Dancer"
- 17. "Outro"

== 2000 ==
Toni Braxton – The Heat

- 05. "Gimme Some" (featuring Lisa "Left Eye" Lopes) (produced with Babyface)

8Ball & MJG – Space Age 4 Eva

- 03. "Thingz"
- 08. "Pimp Hard"

E-40 – Loyalty and Betrayal

- 04. "Ya Blind" (featuring Jazze Pha & 8Ball)

== 2001 ==
Lil Jon & the East Side Boyz – Put Yo Hood Up

- 16. "I Like Dem Girlz" (featuring Jazze Pha)

T.I. – I'm Serious

- 11. "Chooz U" (featuring Jazze Pha)

Ludacris – Word of Mouf

- 07. "Area Codes" (featuring Nate Dogg)
- 13. "Keep It on the Hush" (featuring Jazze Pha)

MC Breed – The Fharmacist

- 02. "Let's Go to the Club" (featuring Jazze Pha)

Lisa Lopes – Supernova

- 05. "Jenny" (featuring Jazze Pha)

== 2002 ==
Yasmeen Sulieman – When Will It Be Me

- 01. "Blue Jeans"

Tela – Double Dose

- 07. "25 Hoes" (featuring 8Ball & MJG and Jazze Pha)

2Pac – Better Dayz

- CD1 04. "Changed Man" (featuring Jazze Pha)
- CD1 10. "Fair Exchange" (featuring Jazze Pha)
- CD2 05. "U Can Call" (featuring Jazze Pha)

Aaliyah – I Care 4 U

- 10. "Don't Worry" (Previously Unreleased)
- 11. "Come Over"

Nappy Roots – Watermelon, Chicken & Gritz

- 06. "Awnaw" (featuring Jazze Pha)

Lil Wayne – 500 Degreez

- 02. "Look At Me"
- 15. "Believe That" (featuring Mannie Fresh)
- 19. "Get That Dough" (featuring Baby)

Arrested Development – Heroes of the Harvest

- 02. "In Tha South" (featuring Jazze Pha)

Big Tymers – Hood Rich

- 04. "Sunny Day"
- 08. "I'm Comin'"

Baby – Birdman

- 03. "Fly In Any Weather" (featuring Jazze Pha)
- 11. "On The Rocks"
- 13. "Heads Up"
- 18. "Do That ..."
- 19. "Ice Cold"

Field Mob – From tha Roota to tha Toota

- 05. "Sick Of Being Lonely"
- 14. "All I Know" (featuring CeeLo Green)

Pastor Troy – Universal Soldier

- 09. "U Can't Pimp Me" (Featuring Pimpin Ken)
- 11. "Undefeated"

== 2003 ==
Bow Wow – Unleashed

- 02. "Let's Get Down" (featuring Baby)
- 08. "I Can't Lose"
- 09. "Hey Little Mama" (featuring Jagged Edge)

Fiend – Can I Burn? 2

- 05. "From Round Here" (featuring Snoop Dogg & Lil Jon)

T.I. – Trap Muzik

- 06. "Let's Get Away" (featuring Jazze Pha)

Boo & Gotti – Perfect Timing

- 13. "Ride Tonight" (featuring Jazze Pha & Baby)
- 16. "Hot Shit" (featuring Mikkey, Baby & D-Boyz)

YoungBloodZ – Drankin' Patnaz

- 14. "Mind On My Money" (featuring Jazze Pha)

Keith Murray – He's Keith Murray

- 10. "Say Whattt" (featuring Redman)

Rated R – Da Ghetto Psychic

- 06. "Gotta Girl"
- 14. "My Check" (Featuring Jazze Pha)

Murphy Lee – Murphy's Law

- 05. "Luv Me Baby"

Too Short – Married to the Game

- 01. "Choosin'" (featuring Jagged Edge & Jazze Pha)

Monica – After The Storm

- 12. "That's My Man"

Kokane – Dr. Jekyll and Mr. Kane

- 09. "I'm a Rider" (featuring Jagged Edge and Snoop Dogg)

== 2004 ==
ATL – The ATL Project

- 01. "I Wish" (featuring Ciara)

Cassidy – Split Personality

- 03. "Lipstick" (featuring Jazze Pha) (co-produced by Swizz Beatz)

CeeLo Green – Cee-Lo Green... Is the Soul Machine

- 06. "The One"
- 07. "My Kind Of People"

Juelz Santana – From Me to U

- 19. "Now What" (featuring T.I.)

Angie Stone – Stone Love

- 02. "I Wanna Thank Ya" (featuring Snoop Dogg)

Lil Jon & the East Side Boyz – Crunk Juice

- 07. "Contract" (featuring Trillville & Pimpin' Ken)

Fantasia – Free Yourself

- 11. "Don't Act Right" (featuring Jazze Pha)

Ciara – Goodies

- 02. "1, 2 Step"
- 03. "Thug Style"
- 06. "Pick up the Phone"
- 07. "Lookin' At You"

T.I. – Urban Legend

- 07. "Get Loose" (featuring Nelly)

Various artists – NBA Live 2005 soundtrack

- 00. "It's In The Game" (Murphy Lee featuring Jazze Pha & Jody Breeze)

Various artists – GAP: Favorite Songs

- 06. "Let's Stay Together" (Michelle Williams)

Lil Wayne – Tha Carter

- 19. "Earthquake" (featuring Jazze Pha)

Nelly – Sweat

- 02. "Na-Nana-Na" (featuring Jazze Pha)

Nelly – Suit

- 02. "Pretty Toes" (featuring T.I. & Jazze Pha)

Jacki-O – Poe Little Rich Girl

- 03. "Break You Off" (featuring Jazze Pha)

== 2005 ==
Trick Trick – The People vs.

- 05. "Attitude Adjustment" (featuring Jazze Pha)

Trina – Glamorest Life

- 07. "It's Your B-Day" (featuring Jazze Pha)

Jody Breeze – A Day in the Life of Jody Breeze

- All Tracks (except for "Take It Outside", "Stackin Paper", and "Who Dat")

Twista – Kamikaze

- 06. "Still Feels So Good"
- 08. "Badunkadunk"

David Banner – Certified

- 06. "Touching" (featuring Jazze Pha)
- 13. "Take Your" (featuring Jazze Pha)

Boyz N Da Hood – Boyz N Da Hood

- 04. "Felonies"
- 12. "Happy Jamz" (featuring Jazze Pha)
- 15. "Pussy M.F.'s" (featuring Trick Daddy)

Mariah Carey – The Emancipation of Mimi

- 07. "Tonight" (featuring Nelly & Jazze Pha)

Bun B – Trill

- 08. "I'm Ballin" (featuring Jazze Pha)

Young Jeezy – Let's Get It: Thug Motivation 101

- 12. "Bang" (featuring T.I. & Lil' Scrappy)

Ginuwine – Back II da Basics

- 03. "Secrets" (featuring Jazze Pha)

Various artists – The Longest Yard: The Soundtrack

- 01. "Errtime" (Nelly featuring Jung Tru & King Jacob)

YoungBloodZ – Ev'rybody Know Me

- 12. "Play Ur Position" (featuring Jazze Pha)

Slim Thug – Already Platinum

- 08. "Everybody Loves A Pimp"
- 14. "Incredible Feelin'" (featuring Jazze Pha)

The Notorious B.I.G. – Duets: The Final Chapter

- 09. "Nasty Girl" (featuring P Diddy, Nelly, Jagged Edge, Avery Storm, and Jazze Pha)

Various artists – Roll Bounce soundtrack

- 01. "Boogie Oogie Oogie" (Brooke Valentine featuring Fabolous & Yo-Yo)

== 2006 ==
Young Dro – Best Thang Smokin'

- 05. "U Don't See Me" (featuring Slim Thug)
- 13. "Fresh"
- 14. "What It Is"

Cherish – Unappreciated

- 01. "That Boi"
- 04. "Unappreciated"
- 06. "Stop Calling Me"
- 13. "He Said, She Said"

Rick Ross – Port of Miami

- 08. "For da Low"

Sammie – Sammie

- 01. "Feelin' It"
- 03. "You Should Be My Girl" (featuring Sean Paul of YoungBloodz)

Too Short – Blow the Whistle

- 07. "Strip Down" (Un-Credited Guest Appearance)
- 08. "Nothing Feels Better" (Un-Credited Guest Appearance)
- 09. "Sophisticated" (Un-Credited Guest Appearance)
- 10. "Playa" (Un-Credited Guest Appearance)
- 11. "16 Hoes" (featuring Bun B & Jazze Pha)

Pimp C – Pimpalation

- 06. "The Honey" (featuring Jody Breeze & Jazze Pha)
- 15. "On Your Mind" (featuring Jagged Edge, Big Zack, Ali & Gipp)

Field Mob – Light Poles and Pine Trees

- 02. "So What" (featuring Ciara)

LeToya Luckett – LeToya

- 00. "Tear Da Club Up" (featuring Jazze Pha & Bun B)

Ciara – Ciara: The Evolution

- 12. "Get Up" (featuring Chamillionaire)

== 2007 ==
Keyshia Cole – Just Like You

- 12. "Centerfold"

8Ball & MJG – Ridin High

- 14. "Pimpin Don't Fail Me Now" (featuring Jazze Pha & Juvenile)

DJ Drama – Gangsta Grillz: The Album

- 07. "5000 Ones" (featuring Nelly, T.I., Yung Joc, Willie The Kid, Young Jeezy, & Twista)

Rasheeda – Dat Type of Gurl

- 12. "Holla At Me" (featuring Birdman & Jazze Pha)

Bone Thugs-n-Harmony – Strength & Loyalty

- "Certified Thugs" (unreleased)

Lil Skeeter – Midwest Mastermind

- 10. "I Already Hit Dat Shit" (featuring Snoop Dogg)

Echo – Echo Presenta: Invasion

- 04. "Caliente" (Daddy Yankee featuring Jazze Pha)

Bar-Kays – House Party

- 01. "Sho-Nuff" (featuring Jazze Pha)

Young Buck – Buck the World

- 15. "4 Kings" (featuring T.I., Young Jeezy & Pimp C)
- 16. "I Know You Want Me" (featuring Jazze Pha)

Twista – Adrenaline Rush 2007

- 06. "Say Say" (featuring Cee-Lo, Jazze Pha & Big Zak)

UGK – Underground Kingz

- 03. "Stop-N-Go" (featuring Jazze Pha)
- 08. "Tell Me How Ya Feel"

Mary J. Blige – Growing Pains

- 03. "Just Fine" (produced with Tricky Stewart)
- 07. "Shake Down" (featuring Usher) (produced with Tricky Stewart)

Chris Brown – Exclusive

- 12. "Gimme Whatcha Got" (co-produced with The-Dream)

Leftover

- 00. "One More Chance"

== 2008 ==
Bun B – II Trill

- "My Block" (featuring Jazze Pha)

Usher – Here I Stand

- 03. "This Ain't Sex" (co-produced with Tricky Stewart)

Girlicious – Girlicious

- 08. "My Boo"
- 11. "It's Mine"
- 14. "Like Me"

Cherish – The Truth

- 07. "Superstar"
- 11. "Like A Drum"

C-Side – Class in Session: The Boyfriend/Girlfriend EP

- 02. "MySpace Freak" (featuring Jazze Pha)

T.I. – Paper Trail

- 00. "Like I Do" (featuring The-Dream) (unreleased)

== 2009 ==
Day26 – Forever in a Day

- 14. "Your Heels"

Asher Roth – Asleep in the Bread Aisle

- 10. "Bad Day" (featuring Jazze Pha)

Angie Stone – Unexpected

- 03. "Free"

== 2010 ==
Jessica Mauboy – Get 'Em Girls

- 02. "Handle It"

== 2011 ==
Bobby V – Fly on the Wall

- 15. "Phone #" (feat. Plies)

E-40 – Revenue Retrievin': Night Shift

- 03. "Can't Stop the Boss" (featuring Snoop Dogg, Too Short & Jazze Pha)

== 2012 ==
T.I. – Trouble Man: Heavy Is the Head

- 06. "Sorry" (featuring Andre 3000)

== 2013 ==
August Alsina – The Product 2

- 07. "Hell Yea" (featuring Juelz Santana)

Louie V Gutta – Worth the Wait

- 02. "Worth The Wait" (featuring Jazze Pha)

== 2015 ==
Zona Man – No Advance

- 05. "Plug"

Young Greatness – I Tried to Tell 'Em

- 08. "Moolah"

== 2016 ==
13th Floor – School Daze

- 05. "Digits" (performed by Mannish Mania)

Snoop Dogg – Coolaid

- 16. "Double Tap" (featuring E-40 & Jazze Pha)
