= Gorilla Zoe discography =

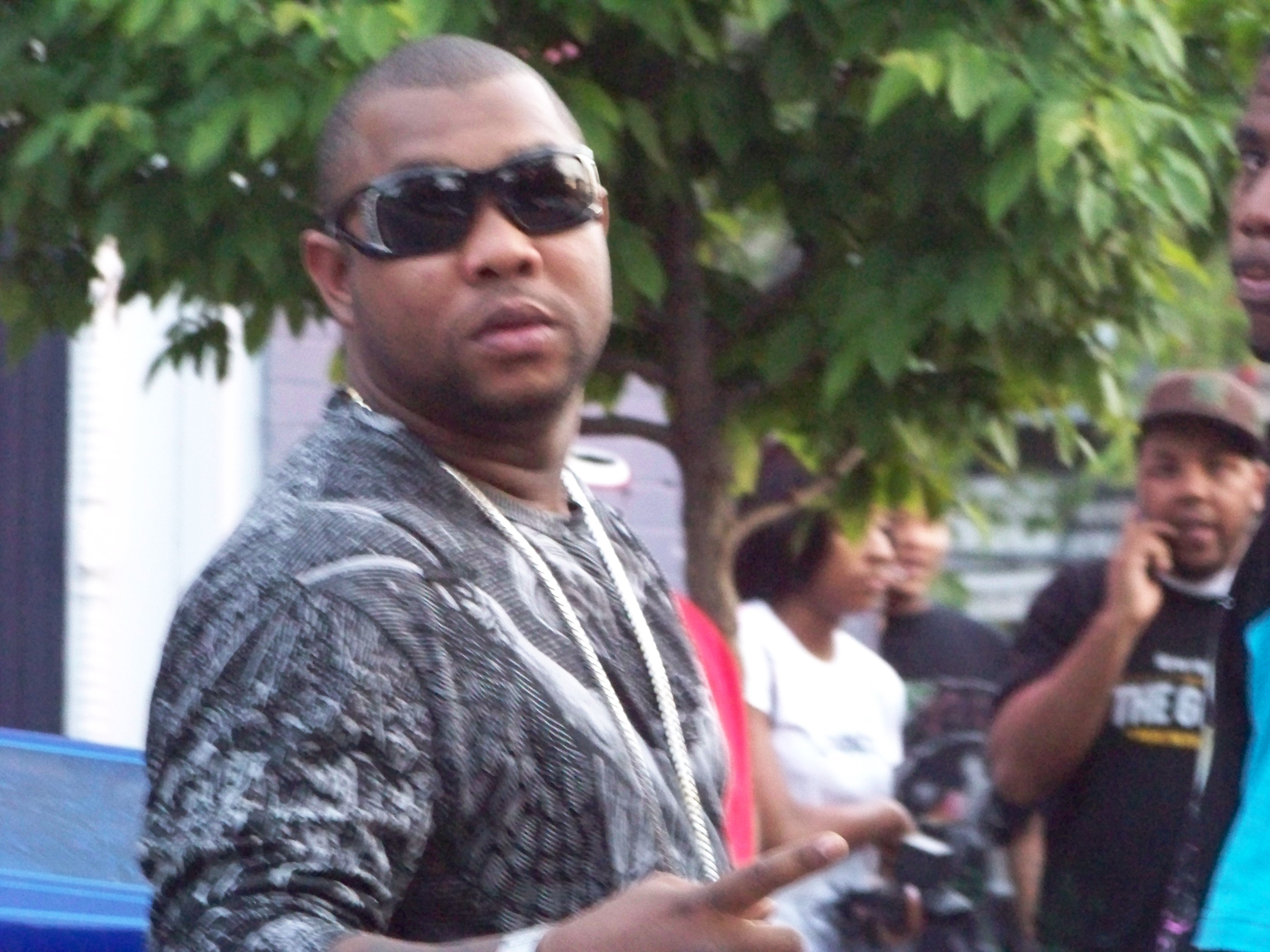
- Gorilla Zoe in Cedar Rapids, Iowa
- Studio albums: 3
- Singles: 10
- Mixtapes: 34
- Extended plays: 1

This is the discography of American rapper Gorilla Zoe.

== Albums ==
=== Studio albums ===
List of studio albums, with selected chart positions
Title	Album details	Peak chart positions		
Title	Album details	US	US R&B	US Rap
Welcome to the Zoo	Released: September 25, 2007; Label: Block, Bad Boy South, Atlantic; Format: CD, digital download	18	8	3
Don't Feed da Animals	Released: March 17, 2009; Label: Block, Bad Boy South, Atlantic; Format: CD, digital download	8	2	1
King Kong	Released: June 14, 2011; Label: Block, E1 Music; Format: CD, digital download	56	12	8

== Extended plays ==
Title	EP details
I Am Atlanta 3	Released: December 14, 2010; Label: Block, E1 Music; Format: Digital download

== Mixtapes ==
Title	Mixtape details
American Gangsta Part 2 (Hood Nigga Diaries)	Released: August 12, 2007; Label: Block; Format: Digital download
I Am Atlanta	Released: August 15, 2008; Label: Block; Format: Digital download
I Am Atlanta 2	Released: June 21, 2009; Label: Block; Format: Digital download
Crack Addiction	Released: February 1, 2010; Label: Block; Format: Digital download
Diamonds, Dopez & Dymez	Released: February 2, 2010; Label: Block; Format: Digital download
Zoe Montana	Released: February 3, 2010; Label: Block; Format: Digital download
Gorilla Woods	Released: February 4, 2010; Label: Block; Format: Digital download
Corporate Trappin' ATM	Released: February 5, 2010; Label: Block; Format: Digital download
Planet of the Apes	Released: February 6, 2010; Label: Block; Format: Digital download
Zoebama for President	Released: February 7, 2010; Label: Block; Format: Digital download
You Don't Mess with the ZOEhan	Released: February 8, 2010; Label: Block; Format: Digital download
G4 Zoe: Male Gigolo	Released: February 9, 2010; Label: Block; Format: Digital download
Zoe Montana, Pt. 2	Released: February 10, 2010; Label: Block; Format: Digital download
The Connect	Released: February 10, 2010; Label: Block; Format: Digital download
The Legend of Zoe-ro	Released: February 11, 2010; Label: Block; Format: Digital download
I Am Gorilla	Released: February 12, 2010; Label: Block; Format: Digital download
Gorilla Ape Shit!	Released: February 13, 2010; Label: Block; Format: Digital download
Stupid Cupid Shawty	Released: February 14, 2010; Label: Block; Format: Digital download
Engraved in Stone	Released: February 15, 2010; Label: Block; Format: Digital download
Walkin' Money Machine	Released: February 16, 2010; Label: Block; Format: Digital download
Gorilla Woods 2	Released: February 17, 2010; Label: Block; Format: Digital download
The Beast Within	Released: February 18, 2010; Label: Block; Format: Digital download
I'm Zoe Good	Released: February 19, 2010; Label: Block; Format: Digital download
Cartunez	Released: February 20, 2010; Label: Block; Format: Digital download
Futuristic Zoo (with J. Futuristic)	Released: February 21, 2010; Label: Block; Format: Digital download
Space Chimps	Released: February 22, 2010; Label: Block; Format: Digital download
My Block	Released: February 23, 2010; Label: Block; Format: Digital download
The Book of Zoe	Released: February 24, 2010; Label: Block; Format: Digital download
The Greatest Zoe on Earth	Released: February 25, 2010; Label: Block; Format: Digital download
Shaquille Zoe'neal	Released: February 26, 2010; Label: Block; Format: Digital download
The Mighty "ZOE" Young	Released: February 27, 2010; Label: Block; Format: Digital download
8 Track (Finale)	Released: February 28, 2010; Label: Block; Format: Digital download
I Am Atlanta 3	Released: February 1, 2011; Label: Block; Format: Digital download
Gorilla Zoe World	Released: March 1, 2012; Label: Block; Format: Digital download
Recovery	Released: June 6, 2014; Label: International; Format: Digital download

== Singles ==
=== As lead artist ===
List of singles, with selected chart positions, showing year released and album name
Title	Year	Peak chart positions			Album
Title	Year	US	US R&B	US Rap	Album
"Hood Nigga"	2007	38	13	7	Welcome to the Zoo
"Juice Box" (featuring Yung Joc)	2008	—	78	—	Welcome to the Zoo
"Lost"	2008	71	29	10	Don't Feed da Animals
"What It Is" (featuring Rick Ross and Kollosus)	2009	—	100	—	Don't Feed da Animals
"Echo"	2009	57	—	25	Don't Feed da Animals
"What's Goin' On"	2010	—	99	—	King Kong
"Twisted" (featuring Lil Jon)	2011	77	63	—	King Kong
"—" denotes a recording that did not chart.

=== As featured performer ===
List of singles, with selected chart positions, showing year released and album name
Title	Year	Peak chart positions			Album
Title	Year	US	US R&B	US Rap	Album
"Coffee Shop" (Yung Joc featuring Gorilla Zoe)	2007	78	39	23	Hustlenomics
"Bottle Poppin'" (Yung Joc featuring Gorilla Zoe)	2007	—	59	—	Hustlenomics
"Portrait of Love" (Cheri Dennis featuring Yung Joc and Gorilla Zoe)	2007	—	55	—	In and Out of Love
"—" denotes a recording that did not chart.

== Guest appearances ==
List of non-single guest appearances, with other performing artists, showing year released and album name
Title	Year	Other artist(s)	Album
"Throw Aways"	2007	Trae, Yung Joc	Life Goes On
"Get It Up"	2008	Santigold, M.I.A.	Top Ranking: A Diplo Dub
"Freakin'"	2008	T-Pain, Tay Dizm	Tr33 Ringz
"Georgia"	2008	Gucci Mane	The Movie (Gangsta Grillz)
"Fly"	2009	Paul Wall, Yung Joc	Fast Life
"Purple Kush"	2009	Juicy J, Project Pat	Hustle Till I Die
"Keep on Rollin'"	2011	Trae Tha Truth	Street King
"Choices"	2012	Armstrong	Kold World Kold Blood
"Money in My Mind"	2012	Bo Kane	—N/a
"Pop This Pill"	2012	Project Pat, Nasty Mane	Belly on Full 2
"Independents Day"	2013	Ben G	The Reflection
"In da Trap"	2013	DJ Paul, Drumma Boy	Clash of the Titans

== Music videos ==
List of music videos, with directors, showing year released
Title	Year	Director(s)
"Hood Nigga"	2007	Kai Crawford
"Lost"	2009	—N/a
"What It Is"	2009	Malcolm Jones
"Twisted"	2011	Parris

== See also ==
- Boyz n da Hood discography
