= Don Vito (producer) =

American record producer (born 1978)

- Born: Rodney Richard; July 9, 1978 (age 48); Gary, Indiana, U.S.
- Genres: Hip hop, pop, R&B
- Occupation: Record producer
- Years active: 2000–present
- Label: Don Vito Productions
- Website: donvitoproductions.com

Rodney "Don Vito" Richard (born July 9, 1978) is an American record producer. He is best known as the producer who collaborated with Kandi Burruss on projects portrayed on The Real Housewives of Atlanta, including Kim Zolciak's breakout single "Tardy for the Party". He also worked as a judge on The Kandi Factory airing on Bravo, and as executive producer for Burruss' weekly webisode series Kandi Koated Nights.

== Biography ==
Don Vito was born Rodney Richard on July 9, 1978, in Gary, Indiana, to Louis and Juanita Richard. While in high school, he learned the art of DJing and would perform at school dances and local house parties. After being discharged from the Marine Corps, Don Vito moved to Atlanta, Georgia.

In Atlanta, Vito was introduced to a record producer, DJ Cooley C, who gave him the opportunity to work with hip hop artists Ghetto Mafia and Kilo. He later met Ian Burke and was introduced to rapper Solé, who was signed to RedZone Entertainment. After being signed to RedZone by Tricky Stewart, he started working with Solé and artists such as Mya and Blu Cantrell. Less than four years later, Don Vito ventured out with the R&B group Cherish. In 2005, he launched Don Vito Productions, a music and video production company.

On August 21, 2013, Don Vito and his girlfriend LaTavia Roberson, formerly of Destiny's Child, welcomed a daughter named Lyric. The pair welcomed son Londyn on September 23, 2019.

== Discography ==
=== Credits ===
Artist	Album	Year	Credits
Karmin	Hello	2012	Producer
Nelly	5.0	2010	Producer, Programming
Nelly	5.0 Deluxe Edition	2010	Producer, Programming
Nelly	5.0 Deluxe Edition (Clean)	2010	Producer, Programming
Ciara	Fantasy Ride	2009	Producer
Ciara	Fantasy Ride Deluxe Edition	2009	Producer, Audio Production
Gorilla Zoe	Don't Feed Da Animals	2009	Producer
Pleasure P	The Introduction of Marcus Cooper	2009	Producer, Audio Production
Pleasure P	The Introduction of Marcus Cooper (Clean)	2009	Producer, Audio Production
Pleasure P	The Introduction of Marcus Cooper (Japan Bonus Track)	2009	Producer, Audio Production
Hurricane Chris	Unleashed	2009	Producer
Hurricane Chris	Unleashed (Clean)	2009	Producer
Rasheeda	Certified Hot Chick	2009	Producer
Karina	First Love	2008	Producer, Audio Producer
Cherish	The Truth	2008	2008
Cherish	The Truth (Japan Bonus Tracks)	2008	2008
Various Artist	Total Club Hits, Vol.2	2008	Producer
Bow Wow & Omarion	Face Off	2007	Producer, Audio Production
Bow Wow & Omarion	Face Off (CD/DVD)	2007	Producer, Audio Production
Bow Wow & Omarion	Face Off (Japan Bonus Tracks)	2007	Producer
Rasheeda	Dat Type of Gurl	2007	Producer
Yung Joc	Hustlenomics	2007	Audio Production
Yung Joc	Hustlenomics (Clean)	2007	Producer, Audio Production
Yung Joc	Hustlenomics (Bonus MVI Clean)	2007	Producer
Various Artist	Def Jam Sessions, Vol. 1	2007	Composer, Producer
Don Vito	Don Vito Presents: Crunk and Famous	2006	Executive Producer
Cherish	Unappreciated	2006	Producer, Mixing, Audio Production
Young Quon	Doin It...Movin'	2006	Producer
Various Artist	Young, Fly & Flashy, Vol. 1	2005	Producer, Engineer
Various Artist	Young, Fly & Flashy, Vol. 1 (Clean)	2005	Producer, Engineer
Nasty Nardo	Can't Stop Ballin	2004	Composer
Mýa	Moodring	2003	Producer
Mýa	Moodring (UK Bonus Tracks)	2003	Producer
Blu Cantrell	Bittersweet (Clean Bonus DVD)	2003	Producer, Drum Programming
Gangsta Boo	Enquiring Minds, Vol. 2: The Soap Opera	2003	Producer
Gangsta Boo	Enquiring Minds, Vol. 2: The Soap Opera (Clean)	2003	Producer
Psy2ko & Mic L Moodswing	Blood is Thicker Than Water	2002	Producer
Original Soundtrack	Bad Company (Original Soundtrack)	2002	Producer
Blu Cantrell	So Blu	2001	Keyboards, Programming
Original Soundtrack	Da New Dirty	2002	Producer

=== Singles ===
Artist	Single	Year	Credits
Matthew Soloman	"Take That"	2012	Producer
Kim Zolciak	Don't Be Tardy for the Wedding (Theme Song)	2012	Producer
Beanie Sigel	"Dolla Signs" f/ 8ball & MJG	2012	Producer
Lloyd	"The One"	2011	Producer
One Chance	"Want It"	2011	Producer
Soul Train Awards	Red Carpet Theme Music	2010	Original Music
Twista	"Bad Girl" f/ Lloyd	2010	Producer
Young Berg	"Gettin' to the Money" f/ Lil Wayne	2009	Producer
Kim Zolciak	"Tardy for the Party"	2009	Producer
Lil Scrappy	"Stand Up Like a Man" f/ Lil Wayne	2008	Producer
Cherish	"Killa"	2008	Producer
Yung Joc	"Coffee Shop"	2007	Producer
Bobby V.	"Anonymous" f/ Timbaland	2007	Producer
Cherish	"Do It to It"	2006	Producer, Mixing
Twista	"Ain't It Man"	2004	Producer

== Awards and nominations ==
- 2010, BMI, Nomination Special Background Performance Cue
- 2007, Songwriter Award, (Cherish - "Do It to It")
- 2023, Songwriter Award, (Acraze feat. Cherish - "Do It to It")

== See also ==
- "Tardy for the Party" lawsuit
