= Are You Feeling Me =

Are You Feeling Me may refer to:

- "Are You Feelin' Me", song by Aaliyah from Romeo Must Die
- "Are You Feeling Me", song by Terry Dexter from Terry Dexter album
