= One Time (Cherish song) =

Single by Cherish
- Released: February 24, 2017
- Recorded: 2016
- Genre: R&B
- Length: 3:41
- Label: Free The Lyrics
- Songwriter(s): Fallon King, Felisha King

Cherish singles chronology
"Amnesia" (2008)	"One Time" (2017)	"Self Destruction" (2017)

"One Time" is a song by American girl group Cherish released as the lead single from their upcoming third studio album.

== Background ==
During a Facebook Live video on December 19, 2016, Fallon and Felisha King confirmed they were back in the studio recording new music as Cherish. On February 5, 2017, Cherish revealed a new album would be coming very soon and they would be releasing four singles back-to-back announcing the first single would be called "One Time". A preview of the song was released via their Instagram announcing the release date of the song, "Thank you for all of the love and support! Your response has been truly appreciated. We'll be sending out exclusive content and info on our upcoming single, #OneTime. Just subscribe to our newsletter via the link in our bio. Always, Cherish".

== Composition ==
Lyrically, "One Time" finds Cherish attempting to seduce a man who's already in another relationship. The song was described by SoulBounce as a "slow jam."

== Release ==
The song was released on February 24, 2017, through Free The Lyrics. it was rumored to be the lead single from their third album (and first since 2008's The Truth), slated for a 2017 release date. The group also announced that they planned to release a string of new singles after "One Time." The next single, "Self Destruction," was released about a month later.

== Track listing ==
Digital download
No.	Title	Length
1.	"One Time"	3:41

== Release history ==
Region	Date	Format	Label	Ref
United States	February 24, 2017	Digital download	Free The Lyrics	
United Kingdom	February 24, 2017	Digital download	Free The Lyrics	
