= Amnesia (Cherish song) =

Single by Cherish

from the album The Truth
- Released: April 8, 2008
- Genre: R&B
- Length: 3:47
- Label: Sho'nuff/Capitol Records
- Songwriters: Neosha King, Jamie Nicholas Newman

Cherish singles chronology
| "Killa" (2007) | "Amnesia" (2008) | "One Time" (2017) |

"Amnesia" is the title of the second and final single released from Cherish's second album, The Truth. Cherish confirmed this on their blog on March 9, 2008, and announced March 27 that the single's video would be in production the following month. The video premiered on BET's Access Granted on May 6. The single debuted at #100 on Billboard's Hot R&B/Hip-Hop Songs chart, then rising up to #61. The song failed to chart inside the Billboard Hot 100, becoming a commercial failure for the band and their label.

== Track listings ==
US iTunes Single

1. "Amnesia" - 3:47
2. "Amnesia" (Instrumental) - 3:47

== Music video ==
The music video was directed by Benny Boom and starts off with Fallon (one of the twins) singing around a chair and remembering happy times with her boyfriend. Then the whole group is around a chair singing the chorus. Another member does her verse together with the group thinking about her boyfriend as well. Then the group finishes the song by singing the chorus together on a couple of steps in front of a house. The music video premiered on May 6, 2008, on Access Granted, and on 106 & Park on May 13, 2008, The music video was filmed in black and white.

== Charts ==
| Chart (2008) | Peak position |
|---|---|
| US Hot R&B/Hip-Hop Songs (Billboard) | 61 |
