= Bad Company (soundtrack) =

Soundtrack album by Various artists
- Released: June 4, 2002
- Genres: Hip-hop; alternative R&B
- Length: 1:00:24
- Label: Hollywood
- Producers: Jerry Bruckheimer (exec.); Joel Schumacher (exec.); KayGee; Addaryll "Tiger" Wilson; Antonina Armato; Balewa Muhammad; Carlos "Six July" Broady; Don Vito; Dub Pistols; Earthtone III; Eddie Berkeley; Gorillaz; Jason Cox; JL; Perry Melius; Tim James; Tom Girling; Trackboyz; Trevor Rabin; Tricky; Tricky Stewart; Wayne Nunes

Singles from Bad Company
- 1. "911" Released: December 7, 2001; 2. "Breathe in, Breathe Out" Released: 2002

Bad Company: Music from the Motion Picture is the original soundtrack to Joel Schumacher's 2002 action comedy film Bad Company. It was released on June 4, 2002 via Hollywood Records and consisted mainly of hip hop and R&B music. The album found some success, peaking at number 98 on the Billboard 200, number 11 on the Top R&B/Hip-Hop Albums and number 9 on the Top Soundtracks, and featured one charting single "All Out of Love".

== Track listing ==
No.	Title	Writer(s)	Producer(s)	Length
1.	"Breathe in, Breathe Out" (performed by Ali & St. Lunatics)	A. Jones	Trackboyz	3:50
2.	"911" (performed by Gorillaz, D12 & Terry Hall)	D. Albarn; D. Holton; D. Porter; O. Moore; R. Johnson; V. Carlisle	Gorillaz; Jason Cox; Tom Girling	5:49
3.	"B.O.B. (Bombs Over Baghdad)" (performed by Outkast)	A. Benjamin; A. Patton; D. Sheats	Earthtone III	5:06
4.	"6 Million Ways to Live" (performed by Dub Pistols)	B. Abdush-Shaheed; B. Ashworth; J. O'Bryan; J. Sheffield; T. Lawrence	Dub Pistols	5:03
5.	"Tonite" (performed by Next)	B. Russell; B. Russell; E. Berkeley; K. Gist; R. Huggar	Eddie Berkeley; KayGee	4:09
6.	"Na Na" (performed by Pretty Willie)	W. Moore Jr.; W. Wood	JL	4:13
7.	"Anything for You" (performed by Jaheim & Duganz)	D. Angelettie; D. Youngblood; K. Gist; N. Whitfield; R. Lawrence; S. Carter	Addaryll "Tiger" Wilson; Balewa Muhammad; KayGee	3:51
8.	"All Out of Love" (performed by Jagged Edge)	C. Davis; G. Russell	KayGee	3:52
9.	"It's Killing Me (In My Mind)" (performed by Blu Cantrell)	M. Franks; R. Richard; T. Nkhereanye; T. Cobb	Don Vito; Tricky Stewart	3:45
10.	"To Keep This Life" (performed by Rama Duke)	A. Armato; T. James	Antonina Armato; Tim James	4:03
11.	"Excess" (performed by Tricky)	A. Morissette; A. Thaws	Tricky	3:45
12.	"Don't Touch" (performed by Ko-La & Tricky)	A. Thaws; P. Melius; W. Nunes	Perry Melius; Wayne Nunes	3:34
13.	"My Crew, Pt. 2" (performed by Supervision & Blind Gotti)	C. Broady; D. Bordenave	Carlos "Six July" Broady	4:28
14.	"Bmbbo" (performed by Trevor Rabin)	T. Rabin	Trevor Rabin	4:56
Total length:				53:01

== Personnel ==
- Clifton Lighty – backing vocals (track 7)
- Gordon Mills – guitar (track 4)
- Wayne Nunes – bass guitar, guitar, keyboards, producer (track 12)
- Perry Melius – drums, producer (track 12)
- Rich Travali – mixing (track 1)
- Adam Long – recording (track 1)
- Herb Powers Jr. – mastering (track 1)
- Trackboyz – producers (track 1)
- Jason Cox – producer (track 2)
- Tom Girling – producer (track 2)
- Gorillaz – producer (track 2)
- David Sheats – producer (track 3)
- Dub Pistols – mixing & producer (track 4)
- Eddie Berkeley – producer (track 5)
- Keir "KayGee" Gist – producer (tracks: 5, 7, 8)
- Willie "JL" Woods – producer (track 6)
- Adam Kudzin – mixing & recording (track 7)
- Addaryll "Tiger" Wilson – producer (track 7)
- Bale'wa M Muhammad – producer (track 7)
- Christopher Alan "Tricky" Stewart – producer (track 9)
- Rodney "Don Vito" Richard – producer (track 9)
- Timothy James Price – producer (track 10)
- Antonina Armato – producer (track 10)
- Adrian Nicholas Matthews Thaws – producer (track 11)
- Robert Potter – recording (track 12)
- Carlos "Six July" Broady – producer (track 13)
- Steve Kempster – engineering (track 14)
- Trevor Charles Rabinowitz – producer (track 14)
- David Snow – art direction
- Coco "Monster X" Shinomiya – design
- Patricia Sullivan – mastering
- Bob Badami – music supervisor
- Kathy Nelson – music supervisor, producer
- Mitchell Leib – producer
- Jerry Bruckheimer – executive producer
- Joel Schumacher – executive producer
- Desirée Craig-Ramos – soundtrack coordination
- Michael McQuarn – music consultant
