= Better Than Me (Terry Dexter song) =

Single by Terry Dexter

from the album Terry Dexter
- Released: June 22, 1999
- Recorded: 1998
- Genre: R&B
- Length: 4:02
- Label: Warner Bros.
- Songwriter(s): Phalon Alexander; Johntá Austin; Terry Dexter
- Producer(s): Phalon Alexander

Terry Dexter singles chronology
"You'll Never Miss Me ('Til I'm Gone)" (1998)	"Better Than Me" (1999)	"Strayed Away" (1999)

Music video
- "Better Than Me" on YouTube

"Better Than Me" is a song co-written and performed by Terry Dexter. The song appears as the opening track on her eponymous debut album and was issued as the album's second single. It is Dexter's only song to date to chart on the Billboard Hot 100, peaking at #99 in 1999.

== Music video ==
- The official music video for the song was directed by Director X.(formerly known as Little X), a noted music video director famous for his work with Missy Elliott and Destiny’s Child .
- It debuted in early 2000, following the single’s release
- The video reflects a slick, urban R&B aesthetic typical of late-’90s/early-2000s music videos, featuring moody lighting, slow-motion sequences, and dynamic city backdrops.
- Dexter is shown performing in a stylized studio surrounded by ambient, cinematic lighting, intercut with scenes of her walking through city streets and emoting, reinforcing the song’s relationship-focused lyrics.
- Director X’s influence is most visible in the expressive visuals—high-contrast shots and lingering close-ups enhance the song’s emotional tone.

== Chart positions ==
Chart (1999)	Peak position
US Billboard Hot 100	99
US Dance Music/Club Play Singles (Billboard)	4
US Hot Dance Music/Maxi-Singles Sales (Billboard)	20
US Hot R&B/Hip-Hop Singles & Tracks (Billboard)	47
