= Listen (Terry Dexter album) =

Studio album by Terry Dexter
- Released: September 30, 2008
- Label: Penny's Gang
- Producer: Del Atkins; Charlie Bereal; Craig Brockman; Dean "DC" Charles; Jamey Jaz; Nisan Stewart

Terry Dexter chronology
Terry Dexter (1999)	Listen (2008)

Listen is the second studio album by American singer Terry Dexter. It was released by Penny's Gang Records on September 30, 2008. Her first album in nine years, it peaked at number 43 on the US Top R&B/Hip-Hop Albums chart.

== Track listing ==
No.	Title	Writer(s)	Producer(s)	Length
1.	"Crazy"	Jamey Jaz; Terry Dexter	Jaz	4:26
2.	"I'm Free"	Jaz; Dexter	Jaz	4:43
3.	"Love Is Love"	Jaz; Dexter	Jaz	5:01
4.	"Beautiful One"	Jamey Jaz; Rahsaan Patterson; Dexter	Jaz	4:41
5.	"Be with Me"	Jaz; Dexter	Jaz	4:19
6.	"Listen"	Charlie Bereal; Craig Brockman; Nisan Stewart; Sami McKinney; Dexter	Bereal; Brockman; Stewart	4:39
7.	"Sister"	Jaz; Dexter	Jaz	3:37
8.	"Stay in My Corner"	Jaz; Patterson; Dexter	Jaz	4:25
9.	"No Place to Go"	Dennis Matkosky; Lori Perri; Ricky Lawson	Jaz	5:03
10.	"I Don't Need You"	Dean "DC" Charles; Del Atkins; McKinney; Dexter	Dean Charles; Atkins	5:09

== Charts ==
Chart (2008)	Peak position
US Top R&B/Hip-Hop Albums (Billboard)	43

== Release history ==
Listen release history
Region	Date	Format	Label	Ref(s)
United States	September 30, 2008	CD; digital download	Penny's Gang Records	
