= Unappreciated =

Studio album by Cherish
- Released: August 15, 2006
- Genre: R&B
- Length: 46:29
- Labels: Sho'nuff; Capitol
- Producers: Jasper Cameron; Don Vito; Jazze Pha; Adonis Shropshire

Cherish chronology
| Unappreciated (2006) | The Truth (2008) |

Singles from Unappreciated
- 1. "Do It to It" Released: March 21, 2006; 2. "Unappreciated" Released: October 3, 2006

Unappreciated is the debut studio album by the American girl group Cherish. It was released on August 15, 2006, by Sho'nuff and Capitol Records. After shelving their first album, The Moment, with Reprise Records, Cherish independently developed new material for another debut project, featuring contributions from rappers Rasheeda and Sean P and producers Jasper Cameron, Don Vito, Adonis Shropshire, and Jazze Pha, who ultimately signed them to his Sho'nuff label.

The album received mixed-to-positive reviews, with critics commending its youthful energy, songwriting, and infectious production, while noting the group’s limited vocal range and stylistic similarities to other contemporary R&B acts. Commercially, it debuted at number 4 on the US Billboard 200 with 91,000 first-week sales, was certified Gold by the Recording Industry Association of America (RIAA), and also charted at number 20 in Japan and number 80 on the UK R&B Albums Chart.

Two singles were released from the album. Lead single, "Do It to It," featuring Sean P, peaked at number 12 on the US Billboard Hot 100 and reached the top 10 in Japan and New Zealand, while title track and follow-up "Unappreciated" became a top ten hit on the UK R&B Chart, also peaking at number 41 in the United States. Unappreciated was promoted through performances, interviews, and touring, including opening for Ne-Yo, Lil Wayne, Julez Santana, and Dem Franchize Boyz in 2007.

== Background ==
After being featured on Da Brat's single, "In Love wit Chu" from her fourth studio album Limelite, Luv & Niteclubz (2003), producer Jermaine Dupri brought the band to Warner Bros, where they signed with the label's imprint, Reprise Records, and began work on their debut album The Moment. However, after their first single, "Miss P," produced by Dupri and co-written by Kandi Burruss, failed to make an impact, the label shelved the project and the group and the label eventually parted ways. Following their departure, the sisters began working independently on new material. Over the next two to three years, they developed songs with producers including Dre & Vidal, Jasper Cameron, Don Vito, Adonis Shropshire, and Jazze Pha, , who ultimately signed the group to his Sho'nuff Records label in 2005. As the band matured, much of the material from their first, unreleased album was left unused, paving the way for a fresh creative direction for their debut release. The sister co-wrote the entire album, with rappers Rasheeda and Sean P from duo YoungBloodZ also contributing. Cherish also collaborated with rapper Yung Joc on the album.

== Composition ==
Unappreciated has mainly hip hop and R&B tracks. During an interview with About.com about the album, when asked about its composition, the group said, "You can expect a lot of realness, [and] we're trying to bring real R&B back to the world. Right now, R&B is not a genre anymore. It's pop, it's [hip-hop], it's other things. [We] wanna bring back rhythm and blues." In another interview, the band talked about how different this album was from their shelved debut: "Well it’s very different coming out now because with this album we have more creative control. When we came out in 2003, we were young and we didn’t have much of a say in what went down. But this time around, we were able to write every song on the album, which makes this album very personal for all of us." They later added, "From this album you can expect realness. Expect to hear all of our individual voices. A lot of crunk tracks [and] also expect a lot of a cappella singing."

== Promotion ==
=== Singles ===
Two singles were released from Unappreciated. The lead single, "Do It to It," featuring rapper Sean P, was released on March 21, 2006. It achieved substantial commercial success, reaching the top 20 of the US Billboard Hot 100 and charting within the top 10 on both the Pop 100 and Hot R&B/Hip-Hop Songs charts. "Do It to It" also performed well internationally, attaining top 10 positions in New Zealand and Japan and charting in several other countries, including the United Kingdom, Ireland, Australia, Germany, and France.

The album’s second single, the title track "Unappreciated," was a slower ballad that achieved more moderate success. It reached the top 40 in Japan and peaked at number 14 on the US Hot R&B/Hip-Hop Songs chart, while narrowly missing the top 40 on the Billboard Hot 100, peaking at number 41. "Chevy" was intended to be released as the album's third single. However, the merger of Capitol and Virgin Records prevented its release, resulting in the song being issued solely for promotional purposes. Similarly, "That Boi" and "Show & Tell" were slated as singles but were ultimately unreleased due to the merger.

=== Appearances ===
Unappreciated was promoted mainly through interviews and live performances. The group performed their single "Do It to It" on BET's 106 & Park, at the pre-show for the BET Awards 2006, and again on August 1, 2006, on ABC's Live with Regis & Kelly. They later performed the song during BET's 106 & Party New Year's Eve special to ring in 2007. The group also made a special appearance on ABC's Good Morning America to introduce the snap dance. On August 15, 2006, they appeared live on MTV's TRL to promote the album’s release. In late November 2006, Cherish performed their single "Unappreciated" on 106 & Park, a performance that fueled rumors of an on-air altercation between Bow Wow and the group during the live taping.

To further support the album, Cherish launched a promotional mini-tour, performing at venues including Six Flags parks and Orlando Studios. They also served as the only female group on select dates of Chris Brown's Up Close & Personal Tour, alongside Ne-Yo, Lil Wayne, Juelz Santana, and Dem Franchize Boyz. During this period, the group canceled several shows, primarily in California, amid reports of internal disorganization, as well as personal circumstances, including the illness of Farrah's son, which occasionally resulted in shortened sets or performances without her. However, Cherish later embarked on a European promotional tour in November and closed out the year with several Jingle Jam appearances in December.

== Critical reception ==
Professional ratings
Review scores
| Source | Rating |
|---|---|
| About.com | 3.5/5 stars |
| AllMusic | 2.5/5 stars |
| Entertainment Weekly | B |
| USA Today | 2/4 stars |

Mark Edwards Nero, of About.com praised the album, stating: "They might not exactly be the new Destiny's Child, but the four members of Cherish definitely show a lot of promise on their debut album. Fans of snap music, pop-R&B and/or dance club jams should be happy with the upbeat, youthful exuberance displayed throughout Unappreciated." Nero praised the album for its "youthful energy," as well as its "soulful bounce." He also commented that he enjoyed the "mature, meaningful lyrics." However, Nero did criticize "the girls' shallow vocal range" as well as the "lack of distinction between the girls' voices." Vibe editor Celia San Miguel wrote that "with crunk&B on the wane, snap&B seems inevitable. But Jazze Pha protégées Cherish have more than mere gimmickry left." She found that "the slow jams may snap, but they never quite pop."

Andy Kellman of AllMusic gave the album a mixed review, stating, "Though they're still in their late teens and early twenties, they write a lot of their lyrics, and they sound as sure of themselves on Unappreciated as any R&B group with a handful of albums behind them. However, it's clear that they're very much under the influence of their inspirations and contemporaries (from Destiny's Child to Ciara) and aren't yet able to distinguish themselves from what they've absorbed as music fans. Unappreciated is a boilerplate R&B album that's pleasant and likeable, yet it doesn't leave much of an impression and lacks character. Lead single "Do It to It", produced by Don Vito and Cheese, is emblematic in that it's the best track on the album and bears a tremendous resemblance to Ciara's Jazze Pha-produced hits (all the way down to its cadence)." Michael Endelman of Entertainment Weekly said of the album, "This month's model is Cherish, a cheery female foursome that blends the rapid call-and-response vocals of Destiny's Child with the slithery club grooves of Ciara. The mix works, creating a debut that matches of-the-moment beats with sticky melodies. The best cut on Unappreciated is the Don Vito-produced single "Do It to It," which gives the Southern micro-genre known as snap music (think D4L's Laffy Taffy) a Top 40 makeover with a slinky percolating beat and a sweetly cooing chorus." He ended the review by giving the album a "B" rating.

== Commercial performance ==
In the United States, Unappreciated debuted at number 4 on the Billboard 200, selling an estimated 91,000 copies in its first week of release. On September 21 of the same year, it was certified Gold by the Recording Industry Association of America (RIAA) for shipments of 500,000 copies. The album also debuted and peaked at number 62 on the Japanese Albums Chart and number 80 on the UK R&B Albums Chart.

== Track listing ==
Unappreciated track listing
| No. | Title | Writer(s) | Producer(s) | Length |
|---|---|---|---|---|
| 1. | "That Boi" | Fallon King; Farrah King; Felisha King; Neosha King Lawrence | Jazze Pha | 4:22 |
| 2. | "Do It to It" (featuring Sean Paul of YoungBloodZ) | Farrah King; N. King Lawrence; Sean Paul Joseph | Don Vito; Cheese^{[a]} | 3:46 |
| 3. | "Chevy" | Fallon King; Farrah King; Felisha King; N. King Lawrence; Adonis Shropshire; Jasper Cameron | Cameron | 3:25 |
| 4. | "Unappreciated" | Fallon King; Farrah King; Felisha King; N. King Lawrence | Pha; Cey Keyz^{[a]} | 3:55 |
| 5. | "Taken" | Fallon King; Farrah King; Felisha King; N. King Lawrence | Don Vito; Cheese^{[a]} | 3:15 |
| 6. | "Stop Calling Me" | Fallon King; Farrah King; Felisha King; N. King Lawrence | Pha | 3:32 |
| 7. | "Oooh" | Fallon King; Farrah King; Felisha King; N. King Lawrence; Shropshire | Shropshire | 4:16 |
| 8. | "Chick Like Me" (featuring Rasheeda) | Fallon King; Farrah King; Felisha King; N. King Lawrence; Rasheeda Frost | Don Vito; Cheese^{[a]} | 3:38 |
| 9. | "Whenever" | Fallon King; Farrah King; Felisha King; N. King Lawrence | Cameron | 4:02 |
| 10. | "Show and Tell" | Fallon King; Farrah King; Felisha King; N. King Lawrence; Shropshire | Shropshire | 4:28 |
| 11. | "Fool 4 You" | Fallon King; Farrah King; Felisha King; N. King Lawrence | Don Vito | 4:17 |
| 12. | "Moment in Time" | Fallon King; Farrah King; Felisha King; N. King Lawrence; Shropshire | Cameron | 3:05 |
| Total length: | | | | 46:29 |

Japanese and iTunes edition bonus tracks
| No. | Title | Writer(s) | Producer(s) | Length |
|---|---|---|---|---|
| 13. | "He Said She Said" (featuring Nephu) | Fallon King; Farrah King; Felisha King; N. King Lawrence Rodney Richard; John Williams | Don Vito; Cheese^{[a]} | 3:34 |

Enhanced CD
| No. | Title | Length |
|---|---|---|
| 13. | "How to Snap/Making of 'Do It to It' music video" |
| 14. | "Do It to It" (music video) |

Notes

- ^{^[a]} denotes co-producer(s)

== Charts ==
=== Weekly charts ===
Weekly chart performance for Unappreciated
| Chart (2006) | Peak position |
|---|---|
| Japanese Albums (Oricon) | 62 |
| UK R&B Albums (Official Charts) | 20 |
| US Billboard 200 | 4 |
| US Top R&B/Hip-Hop Albums (Billboard) | 4 |

=== Year-end charts ===
2006 year-end chart performance for Unappreciated
| Chart (2006) | Position |
|---|---|
| US Billboard 200 | 185 |
| US Top R&B/Hip-Hop Albums (Billboard) | 54 |

2007 year-end chart performance for Unappreciated
| Chart (2007) | Position |
|---|---|
| US Top R&B/Hip-Hop Albums (Billboard) | 88 |

== Certifications ==
Certifications for Unappreciated
| Region | Certification | Certified units/sales |
|---|---|---|
| United States (RIAA) | Gold | 500,000^{^} |
^{^} Shipments figures based on certification alone.
