= Unappreciated (song) =

Single by Cherish

from the album Unappreciated
- Released: October 3, 2006
- Genre: R&B
- Length: 3:55
- Label: Sho'nuff, Capitol
- Songwriters: Jazze Pha, Fallon King, Farrah King, Felisha King, Neosha King, Cedric Allen Williams
- Producer: Jazze Pha

Cherish singles chronology
"Do It to It" (2006)	"Unappreciated" (2006)	"Killa" (2007)

"Unappreciated" is a R&B song by the girl group Cherish. Being the second single to be released off their debut album, Unappreciated, the song is about a failing relationship. It was produced by Jazze Pha. It peaked at number 41 on the Billboard Hot 100, enjoying more success on the Billboard Hot R&B/Hip-Hop Songs and Hot R&B/Hip-Hop Airplay charts at number 14.

== Background ==
The song, which was written by two of the four members of the group, is about a relationship that is not going well, where a person does not get the treatment that they want. An official remix was produced by Don Vito which featured rapper Da Brat.

== Commercial performance ==
"Unappreciated" debuted at number 98 on US Billboard Hot 100 for the week of October 14, 2006. It peaked at number 41 for the week of December 16, 2006. It stayed on the chart for seventeen weeks.

The single also charted on various countdowns. It charted on BET's 106 & Park, where it debuted at number 10 on October 12, 2006. On November 7, 2006, the single jumped from number 10 to number 5 and was named a "Monster move" on the channel. It peaked at number 2 on the countdown.

== Music video ==
Directed by Erik White, the video starts off with the four sisters on the front steps of their houses singing along to the chorus. Fallon of the group sings the first verse while walking in the neighborhood. The second verse is sung by the oldest member Farrah who is in her house on the couch singing. The last verse is sung by Felisha where she is in front of a car, they are all on top of a house roof singing in the last scene.

== Track listing ==
UK 12-inch vinyl

A1. "Unappreciated" (Album Version)
B1. "Unappreciated" (Edison Remix)
B2. "Unappreciated Remix" (Without Rap)

UK CD single

1. "Unappreciated" (Album Version)
2. "Unappreciated" (Edison Remix)

European CD single

1. "Unappreciated Remix" (No Rap)
2. "Unappreciated" (Album Version)
3. "Unappreciated Remix" (feat. Da Brat)

== Charts ==
Chart (2006–2007)	Peak position
Scottish Singles Sales (Official Charts)	68
UK Singles (Official Charts)	94
UK Hip Hop/R&B (Official Charts)	7
US Billboard Hot 100	41
US Hot R&B/Hip-Hop Songs (Billboard)	14
US Pop Airplay (Billboard)	28
US Rhythmic Airplay (Billboard)	12

== Release history ==
Release dates and formats for "Unappreciated"
Region	Date	Format	Label(s)	Ref.
United States	October 23, 2006	Mainstream airplay	Capitol	
