= Do It to It =

2006 single by Cherish

Single by Cherish featuring Sean Paul of the YoungBloodZ

from the album Unappreciated
- B-side: "Ghetto Mentality"; "He Said She Said"
- Released: March 21, 2006
- Genre: Crunk&B
- Length: 3:47
- Label: Sho'nuff; Capitol
- Songwriters: Sean Paul Joseph; Farrah King; Neosha King; Felisha King Harvey; Fallon King; Rodney Richard; John Williams
- Producer: Don Vito

Cherish singles chronology
| "Miss P." (2003) | "Do It to It" (2006) | "Unappreciated" (2006) |

Alternative cover
- Digital release cover

"Do It to It" is the lead single from American girl group Cherish's 2006 debut album, Unappreciated. "Do It to It" features rap/hip hop artist Sean P. The song peaked at number 12 on the Billboard Hot 100 during its 16th week on the chart. It also reached number three on the New Zealand Singles Chart, where it charted for 23 weeks. It had strong video play on BET and reached number two on 106 & Park. The song played for the limit of 65 days on the countdown and was eventually retired. It was the only video to be retired that year that did not reach number one.

== Music ==
The song moves at a tempo of 74 beats per minute in the key of G harmonic minor, and follows the chord progression of G–Cm–Cm–G.

== Commercial performance ==
"Do It to It" debuted at number 86 on US Billboard Hot 100 for the week of May 20, 2006. It peaked at number 12 for the week of September 2, 2006. It stayed on the chart for twenty-one weeks.

== Music video ==
The video begins with the girls' father forbidding them to party, have boys over, or stay up late while their parents are out of town. After he leaves, Farrah turns to the camera and says: "Y'all know it's on, right?". The girls then begin a dance routine in front of a silver background spliced with a wild party being hosted at their house. The next day, the parents return to find the party mess and a boy wandering around the house, leaving the girls sighing at being caught.

The video was shot in Atlanta, Georgia and was directed by Benny Boom. J-Nicks, Jazze Pha, & D-Roc of the Ying Yang Twins made cameo appearances.

MTV censored the word "kryptonite" from its airings of the video, as in the United States, that word is slang for marijuana.

== Remixes ==
A remix of the song (Rap Remix) exists, featuring rappers Yung Joc, Jody Breeze, Chingy and Fabo. This version also references some songs by other rappers, such as Yung Joc's "It's Goin' Down" and Fabo from D4L's "Laffy Taffy".

== Track listings ==
UK CD single

1. "Do It to It" (main radio version)
2. "He Said She Said" (featuring Nephu)

European CD single

1. "Do It to It" (main radio version)
2. "That Boi"
3. "Ghetto Mentality"

iTunes EP

1. "Do It to It" (main radio version) – 3:44
2. "Do It to It" (instrumental) – 3:43
3. "Do It to It" (a cappella) – 3:39

iTunes single

1. "Do It to It" (main radio version) – 3:44
2. "Do It to It" (edited rap remix) (featuring Jazze Pha, Yung Joc, Jody Breeze, Chingy and Fabo) – 4:10

== Charts ==
=== Weekly charts ===
| Chart (2006–2007) | Peak position |
|---|---|
| Australia (ARIA) | 67 |
| Australian Urban (ARIA) | 13 |
| Belgium (Ultratip Bubbling Under Flanders) | 15 |
| Belgium (Ultratip Bubbling Under Wallonia) | 16 |
| Canada CHR/Top 40 (Billboard) | 11 |
| France (SNEP) | 48 |
| Germany (GfK) | 87 |
| Hungary (Rádiós Top 40) | 33 |
| Ireland (IRMA) | 29 |
| Netherlands (Dutch Top 40 Tipparade) | 12 |
| Netherlands (Single Top 100) | 89 |
| New Zealand (Recorded Music NZ) | 3 |
| Scotland Singles (OCC) | 31 |
| Sweden (Sverigetopplistan) | 58 |
| Switzerland (Schweizer Hitparade) | 79 |
| UK Singles (OCC) | 30 |
| UK Hip Hop/R&B (OCC) | 10 |
| US Billboard Hot 100 | 12 |
| US Hot R&B/Hip-Hop Songs (Billboard) | 10 |
| US Pop 100 (Billboard) | 9 |
| US Pop Airplay (Billboard) | 6 |
| US Rhythmic Airplay (Billboard) | 4 |

=== Year-end charts ===
| Chart (2006) | Position |
|---|---|
| US Billboard Hot 100 | 56 |
| US Hot R&B/Hip-Hop Songs (Billboard) | 53 |
| US Rhythmic Airplay (Billboard) | 16 |

== Certifications ==
| Region | Certification | Certified units/sales |
|---|---|---|
| Brazil (Pro-Música Brasil) | Gold | 30,000^{‡} |
| New Zealand (RMNZ) | Gold | 15,000^{‡} |
^{‡} Sales+streaming figures based on certification alone.

== Release history ==
| Region | Date | Format | Label(s) | Ref(s). |
|---|---|---|---|---|
| United States | March 20, 2006 | Urban radio | Sho'nuff; Capitol | |
| United States | March 21, 2006 | Digital download | Capitol | |
| United States | April 10, 2006 | Rhythmic contemporary radio | Sho'nuff; Capitol | |
| United States | June 13, 2006 | Contemporary hit radio | Sho'nuff; Capitol | |
| United States | August 1, 2006 | Digital download (rap remix) | Capitol | |
| United Kingdom | September 11, 2006 | CD | Sho'nuff; Capitol | |
| Australia | October 30, 2006 | CD | Sho'nuff; Capitol | |

== Acraze featuring Cherish version ==
"Do It to It"

Single by Acraze featuring Cherish
- Released: August 20, 2021
- Genre: Tech house
- Length: 2:37 2:16 (without Cherish's vocals) 3:27 (extended mix)
- Label: Thrive Music
- Songwriters: Sean Paul Joseph; Farrah King; Neosha King; Felisha King Harvey; Fallon King; Rodney Richard; John Williams
- Producer: Acraze

Acraze singles chronology
| "Funky Town" (2020) | "Do It to It" (2021) | "Believe" (2022) |

Cherish singles chronology
| "Last Man on Earth" (2017) | "Do It to It" (2021) | "FLY" (2024) |

Official audio
- "Do It to It" on YouTube

A tech house rework by Orlando-based DJ and producer Acraze (Charlie Duncker), credited to "Acraze featuring Cherish" (only "Acraze" is on cover arts however), was released on August 20, 2021. In the United States, it reached number three on the Billboard Hot Dance/Electronic Songs chart, and in Australia, it reached number 13 on the ARIA Club Tracks chart. On November 12, the track (as issued by Thrive Music) entered the top 40 of the UK Singles Chart for the first time, arriving at number 36 (up from number 60). On the Official Charts of January 7, 2022, "Do It to It" reached to UK Top 10 for the first time when it climbed up from number 43 to number nine in its tenth week on the chart and reached the Irish Top 3. After dropping as low as number 68 on the UK singles chart, the song re-entered UK Top 40 (on the chart week-ending March 10, 2022) after the release of the official video.

=== Track listing ===
- Digital download and streaming
1. "Do It to It" – 2:37
- Digital download and streaming – Tiësto remix
1. "Do It to It" (Tiësto remix) – 2:05
2. "Do It to It" – 2:37
- Digital download and streaming – Andrew Rayel remix
1. "Do It to It" (Andrew Rayel remix) – 2:26
2. "Do It to It" – 2:37
- Digital download and streaming – Sub Focus remix
1. "Do It to It" (Sub Focus remix) – 3:14
2. "Do It to It" – 2:37
- Digital download and streaming – Subtronics remix
1. "Do It to It" (Subtronics remix) – 2:27
2. "Do It to It" – 2:37
- Digital download and streaming – Remixes
1. "Do It to It" (Tiësto remix) – 2:05
2. "Do It to It" (Subtronics remix) – 2:27
3. "Do It to It" (Andrew Rayel remix) – 2:26
4. "Do It to It" (Sub Focus remix) – 3:14
5. "Do It to It" (Rated R remix) – 2:12
6. "Do It to It" – 2:37
- Digital download and streaming – ...More Remixes?!
1. "Do It to It" (Hugo Cantarra remix) - 3:33
2. "Do It to It" (YOOKiE remix) - 2:56
3. "Do It to It" (Tom & Collins remix) - 2:40
4. "Do It to It" (Habstrakt remix) - 3:05

=== Charts ===
==== Weekly charts ====
| Chart (2021–2022) | Peak position |
|---|---|
| Australia (ARIA) | 6 |
| Austria (Ö3 Austria Top 40) | 9 |
| Belgium (Ultratop 50 Flanders) | 5 |
| Belgium (Ultratop 50 Wallonia) | 6 |
| Canada Hot 100 (Billboard) | 33 |
| Canada CHR/Top 40 (Billboard) | 20 |
| Croatia (HRT) | 47 |
| Czech Republic Singles Digital (ČNS IFPI) | 17 |
| Denmark (Tracklisten) | 25 |
| Finland (Suomen virallinen lista) | 18 |
| France (SNEP) | 28 |
| Germany (GfK) | 3 |
| Global 200 (Billboard) | 15 |
| Greece (IFPI) | 6 |
| Hungary (Rádiós Top 40) | 25 |
| Hungary (Dance Top 40) | 1 |
| Hungary (Single Top 40) | 1 |
| Hungary (Stream Top 40) | 14 |
| Iceland (Tónlistinn) | 13 |
| Ireland (IRMA) | 3 |
| Italy (FIMI) | 20 |
| Lithuania (AGATA) | 5 |
| Luxembourg (Billboard) | 13 |
| Netherlands (Dutch Top 40) | 5 |
| Netherlands (Single Top 100) | 1 |
| New Zealand (Recorded Music NZ) | 18 |
| Norway (VG-lista) | 29 |
| Poland Airplay (ZPAV) | 27 |
| Portugal (AFP) | 11 |
| Romania (UPFR) | 10 |
| Russia Airplay (TopHit) | 37 |
| Slovakia Airplay (ČNS IFPI) | 26 |
| Slovakia Singles Digital (ČNS IFPI) | 17 |
| South Africa (RISA) | 51 |
| Spain (PROMUSICAE) | 34 |
| Sweden (Sverigetopplistan) | 34 |
| Switzerland (Schweizer Hitparade) | 7 |
| UK Singles (OCC) | 9 |
| UK Dance (OCC) | 1 |
| US Billboard Hot 100 | 65 |
| US Hot Dance/Electronic Songs (Billboard) | 3 |
| US Pop Airplay (Billboard) | 20 |
| US Rhythmic Airplay (Billboard) | 22 |

==== Year-end charts ====
| Chart (2021) | Position |
|---|---|
| Hungary (Dance Top 40) | 64 |
| Hungary (Single Top 40) | 27 |
| Hungary (Stream Top 40) | 75 |
| Netherlands (Dutch Top 40) | 70 |
| Netherlands (Single Top 100) | 61 |
| US Hot Dance/Electronic Songs (Billboard) | 78 |

| Chart (2022) | Position |
|---|---|
| Australia (ARIA) | 36 |
| Austria (Ö3 Austria Top 40) | 22 |
| Belgium (Ultratop Flanders) | 39 |
| Belgium (Ultratop Wallonia) | 35 |
| Canada (Canadian Hot 100) | 76 |
| France (SNEP) | 145 |
| Germany (Official German Charts) | 20 |
| Global 200 (Billboard) | 51 |
| Hungary (Dance Top 40) | 4 |
| Hungary (Single Top 40) | 17 |
| Hungary (Stream Top 40) | 60 |
| Lithuania (AGATA) | 54 |
| Netherlands (Dutch Top 40) | 90 |
| Netherlands (Single Top 100) | 33 |
| New Zealand (Recorded Music NZ) | 45 |
| Switzerland (Schweizer Hitparade) | 23 |
| UK Singles (OCC) | 82 |
| US Hot Dance/Electronic Songs (Billboard) | 6 |

| Chart (2023) | Position |
|---|---|
| Hungary (Dance Top 40) | 12 |

| Chart (2024) | Position |
|---|---|
| Hungary (Dance Top 40) | 56 |

| Chart (2025) | Position |
|---|---|
| Hungary (Dance Top 40) | 40 |

=== Certifications ===
| Region | Certification | Certified units/sales |
|---|---|---|
| Australia (ARIA) | 3× Platinum | 210,000^{‡} |
| Austria (IFPI Austria) | 2× Platinum | 60,000^{‡} |
| Brazil (Pro-Música Brasil) | Diamond | 160,000^{‡} |
| Canada (Music Canada) | 2× Platinum | 160,000^{‡} |
| Denmark (IFPI Danmark) | Gold | 45,000^{‡} |
| France (SNEP) | Diamond | 333,333^{‡} |
| Germany (BVMI) | Platinum | 400,000^{‡} |
| Italy (FIMI) | Platinum | 100,000^{‡} |
| Mexico (AMPROFON) | Diamond+Platinum+Gold | 910,000^{‡} |
| New Zealand (RMNZ) | 2× Platinum | 60,000^{‡} |
| Poland (ZPAV) | 3× Platinum | 150,000^{‡} |
| Portugal (AFP) | 2× Platinum | 20,000^{‡} |
| Spain (Promusicae) | Platinum | 60,000^{‡} |
| United Kingdom (BPI) | Platinum | 600,000^{‡} |
| United States (RIAA) | Platinum | 1,000,000^{‡} |
Streaming
| Greece (IFPI Greece) | Gold | 1,000,000^{†} |
^{‡} Sales+streaming figures based on certification alone.^{†} Streaming-only figures based on certification alone.

=== Squid Game mashup ===
Zedd created a mashup of this version mixed with the soundtrack to Squid Game which he played at EDC 2021 and subsequently released to streaming platforms.
