= The Truth (Cherish album) =

Studio album by Cherish
- Released: May 13, 2008
- Genre: R&B
- Length: 37:03
- Label: Sho'nuff; Capitol
- Producer: Don Vito; Blade; Jazze Pha; Christopher "Tricky" Stewart

Cherish chronology
| Unappreciated (2006) | The Truth (2008) |

Singles from The Truth
- 1. "Killa" Released: November 27, 2007; 2. "Amnesia" Released: April 8, 2008

The Truth is the second studio album by American girl group Cherish. It was released on May 13, 2008, and was met with mixed to positive reviews from critics. The album spawned two singles, "Killa" and "Amnesia", and reached number 40 on the Billboard 200.

== Writing and recording ==
The group began writing and recording the album about eighteen months after their debut; they wrote (or co-wrote) all but one song on the album by themselves. In an interview with Blues & Soul magazine, group member Fallon King commented that the group had matured since the recording of their debut, and that the recording process was much easier for the follow-up record because the producers were already familiar with the group's style. She added that "with this new album, we definitely wanted everyone to know we are songwriters and our music does reflect our own personal lives."

== Promotion ==
The album spawned two singles. The first, "Killa", was a success in the US and the UK. In the US, the song gave the group their second top 40 on the Billboard Hot 100, where it peaked at number 39. The song was also a hit in the UK, where it peaked at number 52 and gave them their second British top 75 hit. In Canada, "Killa" was also a modest success, where it reached number 94; it remains their only entry on the Canadian Hot 100. The album's second single, "Amnesia", was far less successful, failing to chart in Canada or the UK and peaking at number 61 on the US Billboard Hot R&B/Hip-Hop Songs chart.

== Critical reception ==
Professional ratings
Review scores
| Source | Rating |
|---|---|
| AllMusic | 3/5 stars |
| DJBooth | 3/5 stars |
| USA Today | 2.5/4 stars |

The album elicited generally mixed reviews from critics. Matthew Chisling of AllMusic found The Truth more distinctive than Cherish's debut, but felt its abundance of slow, heartbreak-themed songs hurt the album's momentum, ultimately describing it as "a terrific, outdated R&B album." SoulTracks editor Melody Charles felt that, while the dancefloor-ready songs were the album's highlights, the ballads showcased the group's maturity and that "one can't help but enjoy" them. Steve Jones of USA Today described The Truth as a solid but unspectacular sophomore effort, praising its club-oriented tracks while criticizing its repetitive relationship themes. DJBooth felt that while Cherish were capable singers, The Truth lacked the individuality and depth of leading R&B acts, concluding that its appeal would depend largely on listeners' affinity for the group's relationship-focused style.

== Commercial performance ==
The Truth was far less successful than Unappreciated. In its first week, the album sold 13,000 copies in the US and debuted at number 40 on the Billboard 200. The album also debuted and peaked at number 6 on the R&B/Hip-Hop Albums chart, giving the group their second top 10 entry on that chart. In its second week, The Truth fell out of the top 100 on the Billboard 200, falling to number 109. The album spent a total of 5 weeks on the Billboard 200 before falling off. As of 2009, the album has only sold 80,000 copies in the US.

== Track listing ==
Standard edition
| No. | Title | Writer(s) | Producer(s) | Length |
|---|---|---|---|---|
| 1. | "Killa" (featuring Yung Joc) | Brandon Bowles; Fallon King; Farrah King; Felisha King; Neosha King; Jasiel Robinson; Rodney Richard | Don Vito | 3:49 |
| 2. | "I Ain't Trippin'" | Christopher Stewart; Terius Nash | Tricky Stewart | 3:07 |
| 3. | "Amnesia" | Fallon King; Felisha King; Jamie Newman | JNEW | 3:44 |
| 4. | "Notice" | Fallon King; Farrah King; Felisha King; Neosha King; John Williams; Richard | Don Vito | 3:41 |
| 5. | "Framed Out" | Stewart; Dean Beresford; Ervin Ward; Nash | Stewart | 3:36 |
| 6. | "Before You Were My Man" | Fallon King; Farrah King; Felisha King; Neosha King; Eric Hudson | Hudson | 3:58 |
| 7. | "Superstar" | Cherish; Jazze Pha; Ced Williams | Jazze Pha; Ced Keyz | 3:35 |
| 8. | "Only One" | Cherish | Bryan-Michael Cox | 3:39 |
| 9. | "Love Sick" | Cherish; Ervin Drake; Ken Fambro | Adonis Shropshire; Fambro | 3:47 |
| 10. | "Damages" | Fallon King; Felisha King; Ron Feemster | Feemster | 3:08 |
| 11. | "Like a Drum" | Cherish; Jazze Pha | Jazze Pha | 3:39 |
| Total length: | | | | 39:42 |

iTunes edition bonus track
| No. | Title | Writer(s) | Producer(s) | Length |
|---|---|---|---|---|
| 12. | "Killa" (So So Def Remix) | Brandon Bowles; Fallon King; Farrah King; Felisha King; Neosha King; Jasiel Robinson; Rodney Richard | Don Vito | 3:39 |

Japanese edition bonus tracks
| No. | Title | Length |
|---|---|---|
| 12. | "Do It to It" (Rap Remix; featuring Jody Breeze, Chingy, Fabo, Jazze Pha and Yung Joc) | 4:10 |
| 13. | "Silly" | 5:15 |

== Charts ==
Chart performance for The Truth
| Chart (2008) | Peak position |
|---|---|
| Japanese Albums (Oricon) | 98 |
| US Billboard 200 | 40 |
| US Billboard R&B/Hip-Hop Albums | 6 |
