= Don't Feed da Animals =

Studio album by Gorilla Zoe
- Released: March 17, 2009
- Recorded: 2008
- Genre: Hip hop
- Length: 54:58
- Labels: Bad Boy South; Block; Atlantic
- Producers: Drumma Boy; Dee Jay Dana; Fatboi; Zaytoven; Kane Beatz; Don Vito; Sparkz tha Trakman; K-Rab; Jesse "Corparal" Wilson

Gorilla Zoe chronology
Welcome to the Zoo (2007)	Don't Feed da Animals (2009)	King Kong (2011)

Singles from Don't Feed da Animals
- 1. "Lost" Released: October 14, 2008; 2. "What It Is" Released: February 24, 2009; 3. "Echo" Released: March 26, 2009

Don't Feed da Animals is the second studio album by American rapper Gorilla Zoe. It was released on March 17, 2009. The album peaked at number 8 on the US Billboard 200, number 2 on the Billboard Top R&B/Hip-Hop Albums, and number 1 on the Billboard Top Rap Albums. The album sold 29,000 units in its first week, and 134,660 units by December 2009.

== Critical reception ==
Professional ratings
Review scores
Source	Rating
AllMusic	3/5 stars
DJBooth	3/5 stars
RapReviews	7/10 stars
The Smoking Section	3/5 stars
XXL	3/5 stars

Don't Feed da Animals received mixed reviews from music critics. Steve 'Flash' Juon of RapReviews credited the album for toning down on the skits and featured guests to showcase Zoe's vocal delivery but found it lacking with more luxury rap and silliness. Juon called it "a slight improvement over [Gorilla] Zoe's debut, but his personality still tends to get lost in the mix and he sometimes seems to be a caricature of Southern rap instead of one of its stars." AllMusic editor David Jeffries said that while the album carried the usual ear-grabbing club tracks, it was kept down by the more sophomoric lyricism on tracks like "S*** on 'Em" and "Lost". Brendan Frederick of XXL said he saw some growth in Zoe's brag-rap lyricism along with introspection on the track "Lost," saying that he found his "comfort zone somewhere between singsongy rap and electro R&B, proving that this boy from the hood is finally starting to man up."

== Track listing ==
No.	Title	Producer(s)	Length
1.	"Untamed Gorilla" (featuring JC)	Kane Beatz	3:29
2.	"What It Is" (featuring Rick Ross & Kollosus)	Zaytoven	3:28
3.	"Dope Boy"	Don Vito	4:07
4.	"Lost"	Drumma Boy; J. "808" Frazier, Jr.	4:48
5.	"I'm Dumb"	Jesse "Corparal" Wilson	3:45
6.	"Shit on 'Em"	Zaytoven	3:39
7.	"Hood Clap"	Dee Jay Dana	3:28
8.	"Helluvalife" (featuring Gucci Mane & OJ Da Juiceman)	Zaytoven	3:24
9.	"I Got It" (featuring Big Block)	Drumma Boy	4:03
10.	"Watch Me" (featuring Yung Chris)	Crack	3:53
11.	"Man I"	K-Rab	3:38
12.	"Talk Back" (featuring EbonyLove & Roxy Reynolds)	Sparkz tha Trakman	3:49
13.	"So Sick"	Zaytoven	4:13
14.	"Echo"	Drumma Boy	3:58

== Charts ==
=== Weekly charts ===
Chart (2009)	Peak position
US Billboard 200	8
US Top R&B/Hip-Hop Albums (Billboard)	2
US Top Rap Albums (Billboard)	1

=== Year-end charts ===
Chart (2009)	Position
US Top R&B/Hip-Hop Albums	60
US Top Rap Albums	22
