= Terry Dexter (album) =

Studio album by Terry Dexter
- Released: July 13, 1999
- Length: 48:43
- Label: Warner Bros.
- Producer: Bink; Mike Clemons; Nathan Clemons; Allen Gordon, Jr.; Darryl "Day" Pearson; Jazze Pha; Manuel Seal; Angie Slates; Curtis Wilson

Terry Dexter chronology
| Terry Dexter (1999) | Listen (2008) |

Singles from Terry Dexter
- 1. "You'll Never Miss Me ('Til I'm Gone)" Released: 1998; 2. "Better Than Me" Released: June 22, 1999; 3. "Strayed Away" Released: July 2, 1999

Terry Dexter is the debut studio album by American contemporary R&B singer Terry Dexter. It was released by Warner Bros. Records on July 13, 1999 in the United States. The album did not chart on the US Billboard 200, but it peaked at number 49 on the Top R&B/Hip-Hop Albums chart. Three singles were released from the album: "You'll Never Miss Me ('Til I'm Gone)", "Better Than Me" and "Strayed Away". "Better Than Me" is Dexter's only song to date to chart on the US Billboard Hot 100, peaking at number 99 in 1999.

== Critical reception ==
Professional ratings
Review scores
| Source | Rating |
|---|---|
| AllMusic | 3/5 stars |

AllMusic editor William Ruhlmann wrote: "Eight different producers contribute [...] and they successfully give Dexter a contemporary R&B sound that apes much of what other singers of her ilk are wailing over. And she wails competently, but no more so than any other youthful Mariah Carey wannabe on the market."

== Track listing ==
Standard edition
| No. | Title | Writer(s) | Producer(s) | Length |
|---|---|---|---|---|
| 1. | "Better Than Me" | Phalon Alexander; Johntá Austin; Terry Dexter | Jazze Pha | 4:07 |
| 2. | "I Try" | Denise Rich; Roosevelt Harrell; Sami McKinney; Terry Dexter | Bink | 4:34 |
| 3. | "You'll Never Miss Me ('Til I'm Gone)" | Darryl "Day" Pearson; Mark Andrews | Pearson | 4:31 |
| 4. | "Anything" | Pearson; Dexter | Darryl "Day" Pearson | 4:19 |
| 5. | "Strayed Away" | Andrea Hicks; Mike Clemons; Nathan Clemons | M. Clemons; N. Clemons | 4:36 |
| 6. | "Alone" | Manuel Seal | Seal; N. Clemons | 4:10 |
| 7. | "Are You Feeling Me" | Allen Gordon, Jr.; Seal; Dexter | Gordon; Seal | 4:28 |
| 8. | "I Love You" | Pearson; Kim Jordan | Pearson; Jordan^{[a]} | 4:37 |
| 9. | "I Don't Need You" | Hicks; Seal; N. Clemons | Seal; Big Mike^{[a]}; Nate-Love^{[a]} | 5:09 |
| 10. | "I'm the One for You" | Angie Slates; Curtis Wilson | Slates; Wilson | 4:37 |
| 11. | "Yeah" | Pearson; Dexter; Chris Stein; Deborah Harry | Pearson | 3:37 |
| Total length: | | | | 48:43 |

Japan bonus track
| No. | Title | Writer(s) | Producer(s) | Length |
|---|---|---|---|---|
| 12. | "Better Than Me" (Urban Remix) | Alexander; Austin; Dexter | Pha | 4:07 |

Notes

- ^{^[a]} denotes a co-producer

Sample credits

- "Yeah" contains elements of "Rapture" (1981) as performed by Blondie.

== Charts ==
| Chart (1999) | Peak position |
|---|---|
| US Heatseekers Albums (Billboard) | 31 |
| US Top R&B/Hip-Hop Albums (Billboard) | 49 |

== Release history ==
Terry Dexter release history
| Region | Date | Format | Label | Ref(s) |
|---|---|---|---|---|
| United States | July 13, 1999 | CD; Vinyl | Warner Bros. | |
