= Lost (Gorilla Zoe song) =

Single by Gorilla Zoe

from the album Don't Feed da Animals
- Released: October 14, 2008
- Recorded: 2008
- Genre: Hip hop
- Length: 4:48
- Label: Bad Boy South; Block; Atlantic
- Songwriters: Christopher Gholson, Alonzo Mathis, Ebony Love
- Producer: Drumma Boy

Gorilla Zoe singles chronology
"Juice Box" (2007)	"Lost" (2008)	"What It Is" (2009)

"Lost" is a song by American hip hop recording artist Gorilla Zoe, released October 14, 2008 as the lead single from his second studio album Don't Feed Da Animals (2009). The song leaked in May 2008 entitled "Losin' My Mind", featuring a verse from fellow American rapper Lil Wayne. It is notable that, specifically with the Lil Wayne version, both songs use the auto-tune effect. "Lost" received positive reviews from critics praising Drumma Boy's electronic production and Zoe's sincere Auto-Tune delivery of introspective lyrics. The track peaked at numbers 10 and 29 on both the Billboard Hot Rap Songs and Hot R&B/Hip-Hop Songs charts respectively. It also reached number 71 on the Hot 100.

== Critical reception ==
"Lost" received positive reviews from music critics praising the production and usage of Auto-Tune to reveal an honest performance by Zoe. Steve 'Flash' Juon of RapReviews praised the synth production and use of Auto-Tune to give Zoe a heartfelt performance, saying that "You might not think someone with Zoe's deep raspy flow could pull off crooning, but Drumma Boy plays to his strengths and gives him a joint he can sing low and slow over." Nathan Slavik of DJBooth was surprised by the honesty and self-awareness delivered by Zoe about his newfound lifestyle, saying that "'Lost' is a display of the lyricist lurking behind Zoe’s gravel-voiced swagger, dropping carefully constructed lines like “I’m losing my mind, I’m losing control...of the wheel swerving on and off the road.” That’s right, Zoe dropped a dope metaphor. Suck on that haters." Brendan Frederick of XXL called it "a brink-of-insanity cry for help that’s filled with booming 808s and sing-along digital harmonies." AllMusic's David Jeffries felt that the introspective lyricism was being overshadowed by sophomoric humor, calling it "a heartfelt song about loneliness that would work splendidly if it wasn't for the diaper talk."

== Chart performance ==
"Lost" debuted at number 25 on the Billboard Hot Rap Songs chart for the week of November 8, 2008. That same week, it reached number 42 on the Billboard Hot R&B/Hip-Hop Songs chart. It reached number 10 on the Hot Rap Songs chart the week of January 24, 2009, and spent a total of twenty weeks on the chart. That same week, the song debuted at number 93 on the Hot 100. Six weeks later, it moved twenty-two spots to peak at number 71, staying on the chart for eleven weeks. The track peaked at number 29 on the Hot R&B/Hip-Hop Songs chart the following week, and stayed there for 35 weeks.

== Music video ==
The music video was directed by Zollo and premiered on the BET show The Deal. Miami-based rapper Rick Ross makes a cameo appearance along with Atlanta-based rappers Young Jeezy, Ludacris, Plies, Shawty Lo, Lil Jon, Waka Flocka Flame, Gucci Mane, other cameo appearances did include Erup, KRS-One, Slick Rick, Nelly, Fat Joe, YoungBloodz, Cutty, Andre 3000, Big Boi, Fiend, N.O.R.E., DMX, Chi McBride AND Raekwon. The music video is similar to the music video of "Somebody's Watching Me" by R&B artist Rockwell, relating the subject's paranoid fears of being followed and watched, although the lyrics of "Lost" chronicle the emptiness and loneliness that fame can bring. The music video does not show the underground background singer named as "the mistress". It was released on BET, MTV, MTV2 and MTV Jams on December 23, 2008 and on iTunes on January 19, 2009.

== Remixes and freestyle ==
On September 14, 2008, American rapper Bow Wow released a freestyle to the song.

== Charts ==
=== Weekly charts ===
Chart (2009)	Peak position
US Billboard Hot 100	71
US Hot R&B/Hip-Hop Songs (Billboard)	29
US Hot Rap Songs (Billboard)	10
US Rhythmic Airplay (Billboard)	22

=== Year-end charts ===
Chart (2009)	Position
US Hot R&B/Hip-Hop Songs (Billboard)	92
