= Killa (Cherish song) =

2007 single by Cherish

Single by Cherish featuring Yung Joc

from the album The Truth and Step Up 2: The Streets (soundtrack)
- Released: November 27, 2007
- Genre: R&B
- Length: 3:55
- Label: Sho'Nuff; Capitol
- Songwriters: Farrah King; Rodney Richard; Jasiel Robinson; Neosha King; Brandon Bowles; Felisha King; Fallon King
- Producer: Don Vito: Blade

Cherish singles chronology
"Unappreciated" (2006)	"Killa" (2007)	"Amnesia" (2008)

Yung Joc singles chronology
"Portrait of Love" (2007)	"Killa" (2007)	"Lookin Boy" (2008)

Music video
- "Killa" on YouTube

"Killa" is the first single by R&B American group Cherish from their second album, The Truth (2008). "Killa" features rapper Yung Joc. The song is about "not being able to resist the man you know is no good." It is their third single and was described by UK R&B writer Pete Lewis of Blues & Soul as "a robustly funky single which finds the girls teaming up with chart-topping rugged male Southern rapper Yung Joc".

The song was released to iTunes in 2007. The video, directed by Little X, premiered via BET's Access Granted on December 12, 2007, featuring some scenes of the film Step Up 2: The Streets. It was originally announced that there would be a So So Def remix featuring Jermaine Dupri and Rocko; however, even though Dupri was on the remix, Rocko was absent, with the other collaborator being Kid Slim.

== Track listings ==
iTunes single

1. "Killa" (featuring Yung Joc) – 3:55
2. "Killa" (instrumental) – 3:52

US 12-inch single

A1. "Killa" (main) (featuring Yung Joc) – 3:50
B1. "Killa" (instrumental) – 3:50
B2. "Killa" (a cappella) – 3:50

== Charts ==
=== Weekly charts ===
Chart (2008)	Peak position
Canada Hot 100 (Billboard)	94
CIS Airplay (TopHit)	7
Czech Republic Airplay (ČNS IFPI)	9
New Zealand (Recorded Music NZ)	17
Poland (Nielsen Music Control)	4
Russia Airplay (TopHit)	3
Turkey (Billboard)	10
Ukraine Airplay (TopHit)	11
UK Singles (Official Charts)	52
US Billboard Hot 100	39
US Hot R&B/Hip-Hop Songs (Billboard)	53
US Pop Airplay (Billboard)	21
US Rhythmic Airplay (Billboard)	14

=== Year-end charts ===
Chart (2008)	Position
Brazil (Crowley)	85
CIS Airplay (TopHit)	32
Russia Airplay (TopHit)	28
Ukraine Airplay (TopHit)	74

=== Decade-end charts ===
Chart (2000–2009)	Position
Russia Airplay (TopHit)	145

== Release history ==
Region	Date	Format(s)	Label(s)	Ref.
United States	November 27, 2007	Digital download	Capitol	
United States	January 15, 2008	Rhythmic contemporary radio	Sho'Nuff; Capitol	
United States	January 29, 2008	Contemporary hit radio	Sho'Nuff; Capitol	
United Kingdom	March 31, 2008	CD	Sho'Nuff; Capitol	
