= Echo (Gorilla Zoe song) =

Single by Gorilla Zoe

from the album Don't Feed Da Animals
- Released: March 26, 2009
- Recorded: November 2008
- Length: 3:57
- Label: Bad Boy South; Block; Atlantic
- Songwriters: Christopher Gholson, Alonzo Mathis, Enil Markus Mills
- Producer: Drumma Boy

Gorilla Zoe singles chronology
"What It Is" (2009)	"Echo" (2009)	"What's Goin On" (2010)

Remix cover
- Digital cover art of "Echo (Remix)" featuring Diddy.

"Echo" is the third single from rapper Gorilla Zoe's second studio album, Don't Feed Da Animals. Gorilla Zoe uses an Auto-Tune effect for this song. The song was released on iTunes on March 26, 2009 and was produced by Drumma Boy. The official remix features Diddy and another with Ne-Yo and Yung Joc.

== Chart positions ==
Chart (2009)	Peak position
U.S. Billboard Hot 100	57
U.S. Billboard Hot Rap Tracks	25
U.S. Billboard Pop 100	54
