= Cherish (group) =

American girl group

- Origin: Atlanta, Georgia, U.S.
- Genres: R&B; pop; hip-hop; soul
- Instrument: Vocals
- Years active: 2002–present
- Labels: Free the Lyrics; Capitol; Sho'nuff; Warner Music Group
- Members: Fallon King; Felisha King-Harvey; Farrah King; Neosha King Lawrence
- Website: officialcherish.com

Cherish is an American R&B music group consisting of sisters Fallon, Felisha, Farrah, and Neosha King. Originating from Atlanta, both of their parents are musicians, their father having been in the band Professions of Sounds, who frequently toured with acts such as the Emotions and Earth, Wind & Fire. The group was signed to Capitol Records and Sho'nuff Records. They experienced chart success with the hit song "Do It to It".

The group first rose to fame when they were featured on the single "In Love wit Chu", by Da Brat. They quickly followed up with their official debut single, "Miss P.", which had minor success on the Hot R&B/Hip-Hop Songs chart in the US. After the single failed to hit the pop charts, their initial debut album was canceled. However, they continued recording music, and lent their vocals to a soundtrack for The Powerpuff Girls. In 2006, they released their second single, "Do It to It". The single was met with critical and commercial success, and was followed up with their debut album, Unappreciated, which reached number 4 on the Billboard 200 albums chart in the US. 2008 saw the release of the group's second album, The Truth which hit number 40 on the Billboard 200 albums chart. It was preceded by the release of their second Top 40 hit, "Killa", which peaked at number 39 on the Billboard Hot 100.

Fallon and Felisha also compose music for other artists. Felisha wrote songs for Tamar Braxton and Sevyn Streeter, and co-wrote Jacob Latimore's song "Climb" together with Fallon.

== Biography ==
=== Early life and career beginnings ===
The group originally consisted of four sisters. Farrah King (born February 17, 1984), Neosha King (born January 26, 1986) and twins Fallon and Felisha King (born June 5, 1988). Originally from Maywood, Illinois, the four sisters moved to Atlanta to begin their musical career. The girls stated that they have been a group since the oldest, Farrah, was two years old. The girls were also quick to start singing professionally, starting when Farrah was only seven years old. The group also stated, in an interview with MTV, that their father was the one that brought them together, as their parents were singers as well. When asked about where their name came from, the girls stated, "It's funny because we were sitting in the hotel room trying to come up with a name for the group. My father, which is our manager asked us "well what do you cherish?" Do you cherish what you do? We said yes and that's how the name Cherish came about."

Cherish first rose to fame when they teamed up with female hip hop artist Da Brat to record a duet with her. The finished track, titled "In Love wit Chu", was released on March 3, 2003. The song became a commercial success in the United States, charting on many charts in the country. The single reached the top 10 of the Billboard Rhythmic Top 40 chart, peaking at number 9. The single also became a success on the Hot Rap Songs chart, peaking at number 12. On the Billboard Hot 100, the single narrowly missed the top 40, peaking at number 44.

=== 2003–2004: The Moment ===
Cherish's first solo single, titled "Miss P.", was produced by Jermaine Dupri, written by Kandi and featured Da Brat. They had been signed to Warner Bros.' imprint Reprise Records. After the success of their collaboration with Da Brat, the single was expected to be a hit. However, the single failed to chart on any major charts in the U.S. or countries other than the girl's own. It did, however, have minor success on the Hot R&B/Hip-Hop Songs chart in the United States, where it peaked at number 87. Other than a performance of the song on Soul Train in May 2003, the single received little promotion, which can be attributed to its commercial failure. Due to the commercial failure of its lead single, the group's debut album, titled The Moment, was shelved a few months later. After their album was dropped, the group recorded three songs for The Powerpuff Girls: Power Pop soundtrack, called "Chemical X", "Power of a Female", and "Me and My Girls". A music video for "Power of the Female" was released as a promotional single on Cartoon Network in mid-2003.

=== 2005–2007: Unappreciated ===
In 2005, the girls began work on another album, since their previous album had been shelved. They wrote almost the entire album and said this work is so much more mature and themselves than their unreleased previous work. The album had productions from Jermaine Dupri, Don Vito, and Jazze Pha. On March 21, 2006, Cherish released their first single in three years, titled Do It to It. The single featured Sean P on guest vocals. The single was met to a positive critical reception, as well as a strong commercial reception. The single was met with a large amount of success in the US, charting on several Billboard charts. The single became their first to reach the top 20 of the Billboard Hot 100, when it peaked at number 12. The single was also success on the Pop 100 chart, where it peaked at number 2, as well as the Hot R&B/Hip-Hop Songs chart, reaching a peak of number 10 on that chart. The single also was a major hit in New Zealand, peaking at number 3 on the official singles chart. The song also climbed to the top 40 in the United Kingdom and Ireland, peaking at number 30 and 34 respectively. The song also charted in countries such as Australia, peaking at number 67, Germany, peaking at number 87, and France, reaching a peak of number 48.

After the success of "Do It to It", their debut album was released on August 15, 2006, on Capitol Records and was named Unappreciated. It debuted at number four on the Billboard 200 selling 91,000 copies making it one of only a few R&B girl group projects to hit the top five on the chart in almost a year. The album also charted in Japan where it reached number 62 on the Oricon chart. In the United Kingdom, the album debuted at number 80, and has since sold 30,000 copies in that country. As of September 21, 2006, the album has been certified Gold by the RIAA. On January 12, Cherish released the album's second single, the title track "Unappreciated". The single was received warmly by critics, however, it failed to achieve the commercial success that its predecessor had. In the US, the single peaked just outside the Top 40 of the Billboard Hot 100 at number 41. It did have success on the Hot R&B/Hip-Hop Songs, peaking at number 20. In the UK, the single spent one week on the single's chart, when it debuted and peaked at 187. A third single titled "Chevy" was supposed to be released, however the song was only released as a promo single because in late 2006/early 2007 their label Capitol was merging with another record label which stopped all promotion and prevented Chingy, LeToya Luckett, Janet Jackson, Brooke Valentine & Cherish from releasing their next singles. By April 29, 2007, the album was certified Platinum and since has sold over 1,200,000 copies in the United States and 1.5 million worldwide.

During this time Cherish was the only female group on select dates, as the opening act for Chris Brown's Up Close & Personal Tour, along with Ne-Yo, Lil Wayne, Julez Santana and Dem Franchize Boyz, which ran from August to October. Cherish ended up cancelling a handful of their live shows, mainly their Californian concerts, due to rumors the group was very unorganized; it was stated that Neosha was the only member in the group who was committed. Farrah's son Jayden being sick caused the group to either cancel shows or shorten their live set when she was absent. However, Cherish then embarked on a European promotional tour in November, and finished up the year with a few Jingle Jam shows in December.

=== 2007–2010: The Truth, lineup change and F&F ===
In 2007, the girls confirmed that they were back in the studio recording for a new album. They later confirmed that the album would feature production from artist such as Don Vito, Blade, Jazze Pha and Tricky Stewart. In the Summer of 2007, a song titled "Bat to the Range", produced by the Clutch was leaked online. However, it was later decided that the song would not appear on the girls' second album. In October 2007, Cherish revealed the lead single from their second album would be released the following month. It was later confirmed that the single was called Killa, and would feature Yung Joc on guest vocals. The single was released for airplay and digital download on November 27, 2007. The video premiered via BET's Access Granted on December 12, featuring some scenes of the film Step Up 2: The Streets. The video was directed by Canadian Little X. In the US, the single became another hit for the group. It became their second top 40 hit on the Billboard Hot 100, reaching a peak of number 39. It also reached the top 40 of the Pop 100, peaking at number 23. The single has become one of the group's poorest performing singles on the Hot R&B/Hip-Hop Songs, only reaching a peak of 53. On the UK Singles Chart, the single climbed to a peak of 52, making it their second highest-charting single to date. The single did become their first to chart in the Czech Republic, where it peaked at number 10. It also became their second top 20 hit in New Zealand, reaching a peak of number 18.

Their second album titled The Truth was released on May 13, 2008. In a promotional interview, member Fallon said of the album, "The biggest difference to me is the fact that you grow artistically whenever you're being creative and we've been creative for the past couple of years. Our artistry has grown. When we wrote The Truth, we named the album The Truth because basically every song on the album is from personal experiences and we wanted to get personal with our fans. We want everybody to know that they're not alone going through these things and we're here." The album was released in the UK on May 12, while the Japanese release is on May 14 and featured two bonus tracks, "Do It to It" (Rap Remix) and "Silly". In the US, the album only sold 13,000 copies in the first week of release, which led to it debuting at number 40 on the Billboard 200. In Japan, the album debuted at number 98 on the official album chart, and has sold only 2,300 copies in that country to date. As of 2011, the album has sold only 30,000 copies in the United States. A second single from the album was released, titled "Amnesia". The single failed to make an impact, however, missing the Billboard Hot 100 entirely. It did peak at number 61 on the Hot R&B/Hip-Hop Songs chart, though.

In Spring 2008, Fallon and Felisha confirmed that they were working on a side project that didn't involve the other two members of the group. Under the name F+F, the girls began recording an album separate from Cherish. The fact they were working on solo projects made many fans speculate that the group was breaking up. In early 2009, a track by F+F called "Infected" was leaked online by an unknown source. This fueled the rumors of the band breaking up even more. Soon after, both Farrah and Neosha left the group, leaving just the duo of Fallon and Felisha. Not much was heard from Cherish until 2010 when Cherish released a tribute song to Haiti called The Voices Beyond. A few weeks later, the duo filmed a music video for the song "Don't Let Him Get Away" by Rasheeda, as the girls are featured on the track. On September 28, 2010, another track by F+F titled "Lights Out" was leaked online. Later in 2010, Capitol Records confirmed that the remaining members of Cherish would be releasing a new album, titled "The Breakthrough". On October 27, 2010, Fallon & Felisha did an exclusive interview with AceShowBiz, where they were asked on the status of Cherish as a group. Fallon responded by saying "Cherish is a brand and a bond that is unbreakable. We plan on having a very long career in the music industry and to definitely release more albums as a group in the near future". In mid-November 2010, music videos for both "Infected" and "Lights Out" were filmed but have yet to be released.

=== 2011–2020: New album and music ===
On May 10, 2011, it was announced on Cherish's official Facebook that they would be working on a new album. On September 20, 2011, Cherish stated on their Facebook that they have reunited as a foursome and would be releasing new music in November.

A song called "Like That" by Fallon and Felisha featured in the 2011 film S.W.A.T.: Firefight (sequel to 2003's S.W.A.T.) and on the film's soundtrack.

Fallon and Felisha announced on their Twitter account that their next single would be "Young Forever"; however, plans for the single's release became uncertain following the announcement of Cherish's return in May 2011.

On November 18, 2011, Cherish confirmed that their EP had been pushed back and would not be released in November, as previously stated in September 2011. The release date was then set for February 2012.

In December 2011, two new songs marked as Cherish tracks, "Invader" and "Secretary", leaked online. On January 14, 2012, Cherish announced a possible reality series based on the band, and that they were filming the pilot. On February 22, 2013, Cherish announced via their official Facebook that a single titled "Get That Boy" would be released on March 1, 2013. A promotional video was also made and uploaded onto the band's YouTube page. However, it was later revealed that the single would be pushed back until March 15, 2013, in favor of "Going in Circles", which was released on March 2, 2013, via YouTube.

On December 19, 2016, sisters Fallon and Felisha King announced during a Facebook live video they were reuniting as Cherish once again working on new music as a duo and that Farrah and Noesha would feature on a lot of music but the group will remain as a two-piece.

On February 5, 2017, Fallon and Felisha King announced their excitement for their upcoming album and that they would be releasing four singles back-to-back and announcing a new tour would be coming and the first single "One Time" would be released on February 24, 2017, through their Facebook page. "One Time" was released on February 24, 2017, as the first single from their upcoming album.

=== 2020–present: Remix success ===
In 2021, Fallon and Felisha starred in BET Presents: The Encore, which documented the formation of R&B supergroup BluPrint alongside Shamari Devoe of Blaque and Kiely Williams of 3LW. Their eponymous debut EP was released August 11, 2021.

In 2021, Staten Island-born, Orlando-based DJ and producer Charlie Duncker (Acraze) remixed their 2006 single "Do It to It". Originally a UK Top 40 hit featuring 'Sean Paul of YoungBloodZ' (Sean P.), the new version was credited to "Acraze featuring Cherish" and was released on August 20, 2021. On November 12, the track (as issued by Thrive Music) entered the top 40 of the UK Singles Chart for the first time, arriving at number 36 (up from number 60). It was also a top 40 hit in Germany and on the Official Irish Singles Chart. On the chart of December 7, 2021, "Do It to It" reached to UK Top 10 for the first time when it climbed up from number 43 to number 9 in its tenth week on the chart. The single also reached the Official Irish Singles Chart Top 3 on this date. In the United States, it reached number three on the Billboard Hot Dance/Electronic Songs chart, and in Australia, it reached number 13 on the ARIA Club Tracks chart.

On December 8, 2023, Fallon King released a single titled "paper planes" accompanied by a lyric video on Instagram.

In 2024, Fallon and Felisha were featured on the "Genius: MLK/X (Songs from the Original Series)" soundtrack for the National Geographic biographical anthology drama television series Genius' fourth season focusing on the lives of Martin Luther King Jr. and Malcolm X. They released 2 songs on that EP - "That Girl" and "Protector." On Mother's Day (May 10) in 2024, Felisha King released a 4-track EP "Uncharted" under the stage name Felisha Fury, alongside a podcast about motherhood with the same name.

On July 29, 2024, Mura Masa released "FLY" featuring Cherish for his "Curve 1" album. The track samples the bridge of Cherish's "Killa".

== Artistry ==
Unappreciated features mainly hip hop and R&B tracks. During an interview about the album, when asked about its composition, the group said: "You can expect a lot of realness, [and] we're trying to bring real R&B back to the world. Right now, R&B is not a genre anymore. It's pop, it's hip-hop, it's other things. I wanna bring back rhythm and blues." During a different interview, the girls talked about how different this album was from their shelved debut: "Well it's very different coming out now because with this album we have more creative control. When we came out in 2003, we were young and we didn't have much of a say in what went down. But this time around, we were able to write every song on the album, which makes this album very personal for all of us." They later added on, "From this album you can expect realness. Expect to hear all of our individual voices. A lot of crunk tracks like our first single 'Do It to It'. Also expect a lot of a cappella singing."

== Discography ==
=== Albums ===
| Title | Information | Peak positions | | | Certifications |
| Title | Information | US | US R&B | JPN | Certifications |
|---|---|---|---|---|---|
| Unappreciated | Released: August 15, 2006; Label: Capitol, Sho'nuff; Formats: LP, CD, digital download | 4 | 4 | 62 | RIAA: Gold |
| The Truth | Released: May 13, 2008; Label: Capitol, Sho'nuff; Formats: LP, CD, digital download | 40 | 6 | 98 | |

==== Production discography ====
| Title | Year | Artist | Co-written with | Album |
|---|---|---|---|---|
| "Simple Things" | 2015 | Tamar Braxton | Tamar Braxton, LaShawn Daniels, Jamal Jones, Blac Elvis | Calling All Lovers |
| "Before I Do" | 2016 | Sevyn Streeter | Sevyn Streeter, Jeremy Reeves, Ray Romulus, Jonathan Yip, Ray Charles McCullough II, Ronald Isley, Ernie Isley, Rudolph Isley, O'Kelly Isley Jr., Chris Jasper | Girl Disrupted |

=== Singles ===
List of singles, with selected chart positions
| Year | Title | Peak chart positions | | | | | | | | Certifications | Album |
| Year | Title | US | US R&B | US Pop | UK | NZ | JAP | AUS | CAN | Certifications | Album |
|---|---|---|---|---|---|---|---|---|---|---|---|
| 2003 | "Miss P." (featuring Da Brat) | — | 87 | — | — | — | — | — | — | | The Moment |
| 2006 | "Do It to It" (featuring Sean P) | 12 | 10 | 9 | 30 | 3 | — | 67 | 77 | RMNZ: Platinum | Unappreciated |
| 2006 | "Unappreciated" | 41 | 14 | 28 | 94 | — | — | — | — | | Unappreciated |
| 2007 | "Killa" (featuring Yung Joc) | 39 | 53 | 23 | 52 | 18 | — | — | 94 | | The Truth |
| 2008 | "Amnesia" | — | 61 | — | — | — | — | — | — | | The Truth |
| 2013 | "Going in Circles" | — | — | — | — | — | — | — | — | | Non-album single |
| 2017 | "One Time" | — | — | — | — | — | — | — | — | | TBA |
| 2017 | "Self Destruction" | — | — | — | — | — | — | — | — | | |
| 2017 | "Last Man on Earth" | — | — | — | — | — | — | — | — | | |
| "—" denotes a recording that did not chart or was not released. | | | | | | | | | | | |

==== Featured singles ====
| Year | Title | Peak chart positions | | | | | | Certifications | Album |
| Year | Title | US | US Dance | US R&B | WW | AUS | UK | Certifications | Album |
|---|---|---|---|---|---|---|---|---|---|
| 2003 | "In Love wit Chu" (Da Brat featuring Cherish) | 44 | — | 32 | — | — | — | | Limelite, Luv & Niteclubz |
| 2009 | "Don't Let Him Get Away" (Rasheeda featuring Cherish) | — | — | — | — | — | — | | Certified Hot Chick |
| 2021 | "Do It to It" (Acraze featuring Cherish) | 65 | 3 | — | 15 | 5 | 9 | RIAA: Platinum; ARIA: 3× Platinum; BPI: Platinum | Non-album single |
| 2024 | "FLY" (Mura Masa featuring Cherish) | — | — | — | — | — | — | | Curve 1 |
"—" denotes a recording that did not chart or was not released.

=== Other appearances ===
| Year | Song | Album |
|---|---|---|
| 2003 | "Power of the Female" | The Powerpuff Girls: Power Pop soundtrack |
| 2003 | "Chemical X" | The Powerpuff Girls: Power Pop soundtrack |
| 2003 | "Me and My Girls" | The Powerpuff Girls: Power Pop soundtrack |
| 2009 | "Secret Lover" (Hurricane Chris featuring Cherish) | Unleashed |
