= Terry Dexter =

American contemporary R&B singer

- Born: Detroit, Michigan, U.S.
- Origin: Los Angeles, California, U.S.
- Genres: R&B, soul, pop, dance
- Years active: 1996–present
- Labels: Reprise; Warner Bros.; Penny's Gang

Terry Dexter is an American actress and contemporary R&B singer.

== Early life ==
Dexter was born in Detroit, Michigan. She has a twin sister, and she describes her ethnicity simply as multiracial.

== Music career ==
From the age of 9 to 14, Dexter was a lead singer in the four-piece band Tristar, which played live all over the Detroit area and neighboring cities. She began singing background for other artists at age 11, most notably for Simply Red. At age 13 she signed to Elektra Records, but an album on the label never materialized. Dexter signed to Warner Bros. Records in 1998 in her late teens, and she released her eponymous debut album and two singles from the album, "Better Than Me" and "Strayed Away" in 1999. Her debut single, "You'll Never Miss Me ('Til I'm Gone)", featured on the Rush Hour film soundtrack, was released via Warner Bros. subsidiary Reprise Records. She then moved to A&M Records and was featured on the single "Magic" alongside the Black Eyed Peas as part of the Legally Blonde soundtrack but left the label without having released an album. Dexter's critically acclaimed second album, Listen, spanned two singles and was released via Penny's Gang Records/Universal in 2008.

== Discography ==
=== Albums ===
Title	Album details	Peak positions	
Title	Album details	US R&B	US Heat
Terry Dexter	Released: July 13, 1999; Label: Warner Bros.; Format: CD, vinyl	49	31
Listen	Released: September 30, 2008; Label: Penny's Gang; Format: CD, digital download	43	—

=== Singles ===
Title	Year	Chart Positions		Album
Title	Year	US	US R&B	Album
"You'll Never Miss Me ('Til I'm Gone)"	1998	—	—	Terry Dexter
"Better Than Me"	1999	99	47	Terry Dexter
"Strayed Away"	1999	—	62	Terry Dexter
"Beautiful One"	2008	—	—	Listen

== Filmography ==
=== Film ===
Year	Title	Role	Notes
2003	Deliver Us from Eva	Valerie	
2009	Love in the Nick Of Tyme	Tyme Prentice	Video
2010	How Do You Spell Love?	-	Short
2011	Brickwalk Café	Hers	
2011	Battle Buddy	Sgt. Rainey	Short
2011	Tent City, USA	Rosemary	Short
2012	The Co-Star	Darcel	Short
2014	hMTU-1	Bobby Reynolds	Short
2014	Melissa Anne	Jenny	Short
2015	The Hit Upon	Lauren	Short
2016	Silent Cry Aloud	Leshawna	
2017	6th & 12th	Detective Cheevers	Short
2018	The Choir Director	Peaches	
2018	DWB: Dating While Black	Kim	
2019	Prey	Mrs. Michaels	Short
2019	Pseudo	Special Agent Randazzo	Short
2022	Grimcutty	Laura	

=== Television ===
Year	Title	Role	Notes
1999	It's Showtime at the Apollo	Herself	Episode: "Eric Benét and Terry Dexter"
2015	The Mr. Peabody & Sherman Show	Joan of Arc (voice)	Episode: "Biggest Fan/Queen Isabella"
2019–23	A House Divided	Eileen	Main Cast
