= Jazze Pha =

American record producer

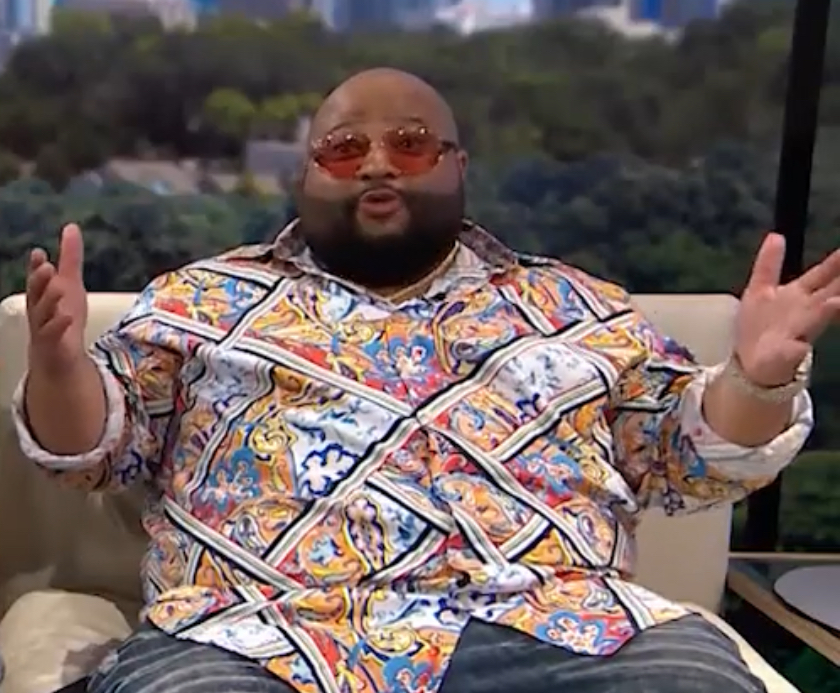
- Jazze Pha in 2019

Background information
- Born: Phalon Anton Alexander; Memphis, Tennessee, U.S.
- Genre: Southern hip-hop
- Occupations: Record producer; rapper; singer; songwriter
- Instruments: Keyboards; vocals; sampler; percussion; bass; drums
- Works: Jazze Pha production discography
- Father: James Alexander
- Years active: 1988–present
- Labels: Elektra; Sho'nuff; Atlantic; Futuristic

Phalon Anton Alexander, known professionally as Jazze Pha (/ˌdʒæzi ˈfeɪ/ JAZ-ee FAY), is an American record producer, songwriter, and record executive. In 1995, he founded the record label Sho'nuff Records, through which, in 2003, he signed R&B singer Ciara. He produced Ciara's 2004 single "1, 2 Step", which peaked at number two on the Billboard Hot 100, and served as executive producer for her debut album, Goodies (2004). Released in a joint venture with LaFace Records, the album achieved multi-platinum certification and established Ciara as a mainstream recording artist.

Alexander has been credited on the Billboard Hot 100-top ten singles "1, 2 Step" and "Get Up" (both by Ciara) and "So What" by Field Mob, the top 20 singles "Let's Get Down" by Bow Wow, "Let's Get Away" by T.I. and "Just Fine" by Mary J. Blige, as well as the top 40 singles "Area Codes" by Ludacris and "Do That..." by Birdman. He is also known for his vocal interjections and appearances as a hype man, backing vocalist, and featured performer on many of his productions.

Sho'nuff Records has signed other acts in addition to Ciara, such as the American girl group Cherish and the rap/dance duo Ayo & Teo.

As a recording artist, Alexander himself had at one time signed with Elektra Records, with whom he released his only album, Rising to the Top (1990).

== Early life ==
Jazze Pha was born and raised in Memphis, Tennessee, but mainly based in Atlanta, Georgia. His father is James Alexander, bassist for the Bar-Kays (an influential group in the Memphis 1960s soul music scene. Jazze Pha's mother's name is Deniece Williams; however, as Jazze Pha pointed out on the Cam Newton Podcast, she is not the same Deniece Williams as the famous singer.

Pha was named Phalon in memory of soul and R&B musician Phalon Jones, who had been in the Bar-Kays with Pha's father, and who had been the band's sax player until a plane crash into an icy lake near Madison, Wisconsin took the lives of four Bar-Kays members (including Jones), as well as Otis Redding, on December 10, 1967.

== Career ==
In 1990, Pha was signed to Elektra Records.

Pha is known for announcing "Ladies and gentlemen" or "This is a Jazze Phizzle product-shizzle!", at the beginning of, and, occasionally, also at the end of, songs which he produced.

== Discography ==
Studio albums

- Rising To The Top (1990)

=== Guest appearances ===
Title	Year	Other artist(s)	Album
"Let a Playa Get His Freak On"	1997	LSG	Levert.Sweat.Gill
"It Is What It Is"	1998	Ras Kass	Rasassination
"Thug in Your Life"	2000	Cap.One	Through the Eyes of a Ron
"Chooz U"	2001	T.I.	I'm Serious
"Keep It on the Hush"	2001	Ludacris	Word of Mouf
"Let's Go to the Club"	2001	MC Breed	The Fharmacist
"Jenny"	2002	Lisa "Left Eye" Lopes	Supernova
"Coco"	2002	Tela	Double Dose
"Gangsta Walk"	2002	Baby D, Lil' C, Slim J	Lil' Chopper Toy
"Awnaw"	2002	Nappy Roots	Watermelon, Chicken & Gritz
"Fair XChange"	2002	2Pac	Better Dayz
"U Can Call"	2002	2Pac	Better Dayz
"There U Go"	2002	2Pac, Big Syke, Outlawz	Better Dayz
"I'm Comin'"	2002	Big Tymers, Mikkey, TQ	Hood Rich
"Get High"	2002	Big Tymers	Hood Rich
"Fly in Any Weather"	2002	Birdman	Birdman
"On the Rocks"	2002	Birdman, The D Boys	Birdman
"Hustlas, Pimps and Thugs"	2002	Birdman, 8Ball, TQ	Birdman
"Ice Cold"	2002	Birdman, TQ	Birdman
"Bowtie"	2003	OutKast, Sleepy Brown	Speakerboxxx/The Love Below
"Pretty Pink"	2003	David Banner, T.I., Marcus	MTA2: Baptized in Dirty Water
"Down South"	2003	Big Tymers, Lil Wayne, Ludacris	Big Money Heavyweight
"Ride Tonight"	2003	Boo & Gotti, Birdman	Perfect Timing
"Think..."	2003	Boo & Gotti	Perfect Timing
"Mind on My Money"	2003	YoungBloodZ	Drankin' Patnaz
"No Average Playa"	2003	YoungBloodZ	Drankin' Patnaz
"Chillin' with My Bitch"	2004	T.I.	Urban Legend
"Lipstick"	2004	Cassidy	Split Personality
"Still Feels So Good"	2004	Twista	Kamikaze
"Badunkadunk"	2004	Twista	Kamikaze
"Pretty Toes"	2004	Nelly, T.I.	Suit
"Girlfriend"	2004	Guerilla Black	Guerilla City
"Contract"	2004	Lil Jon, Trillville, Pimpin' Ken	Crunk Juice
"Ménage a Trois"	2004	Trick Daddy, Smoke, Money Mark	Thug Matrimony: Married to the Streets
"4 Eva"	2004	Trick Daddy	Thug Matrimony: Married to the Streets
"Goodies (Remix)"	2004	Ciara, T.I.	Goodies
"Everybody Loves a Pimp"	2005	Slim Thug	Already Platinum
"I'm Ballin'"	2005	Bun B	Trill
"It's Your B-Day"	2005	Trina	Glamorest Life
"Play Ur Position"	2005	YoungBloodZ, Mr. Mo	Ev'rybody Know Me
"Take Your"	2005	David Banner, Too Short, Bun B	Certified
"Thinking of You"	2006	Unk	Beat'n Down Yo Block!
"A Part of Thugs"	2006	Yo Gotti	Back 2 da Basics
"Pimpin' Forever"	2006	Too Short	Blow the Whistle
"Strip Down"	2006	Too Short	Blow the Whistle
"Nothing Feels Better"	2006	Too Short	Blow the Whistle
"Sophisticated"	2006	Too Short	Blow the Whistle
"Playa"	2006	Too Short	Blow the Whistle
"16 Hoes"	2006	Too Short, Bun B	Blow the Whistle
"Tear da Club Up"	2006	LeToya, Bun B	LeToya
"The Honey"	2006	Pimp C, Jody Breeze, Tela	Pimpalation
"Momma"	2007	Yung Joc	Hustlenomics
"Chevy Smile"	2007	Yung Joc, Block, Trick Daddy	Hustlenomics
"Say say"	2007	Twista, CeeLo Green, Big Zak	Adrenaline Rush 2007
"Pimpin' Don't Fail Me Now"	2007	8Ball & MJG, Juvenile	Ridin High
"I Know You Want Me"	2007	Young Buck	Buck The World
"The Product"	2013	August Alsina	The Product 2
"Double Tap"	2016	Snoop Dogg, E-40	Coolaid
"Savage"	2016	E-40, B-Legit	The D-Boy Diary (Book 1)
"Lose My Number"	2017	Too Short	The Pimp Tape
"Let It All Out"	2017	Bone Thugs	New Waves
"1999 Wildfire"	2018	BROCKHAMPTON	The Best Years Of Our Lives
"This Right Here"	2025	Ciara & Latto	CiCi
