= Motionless in White discography =

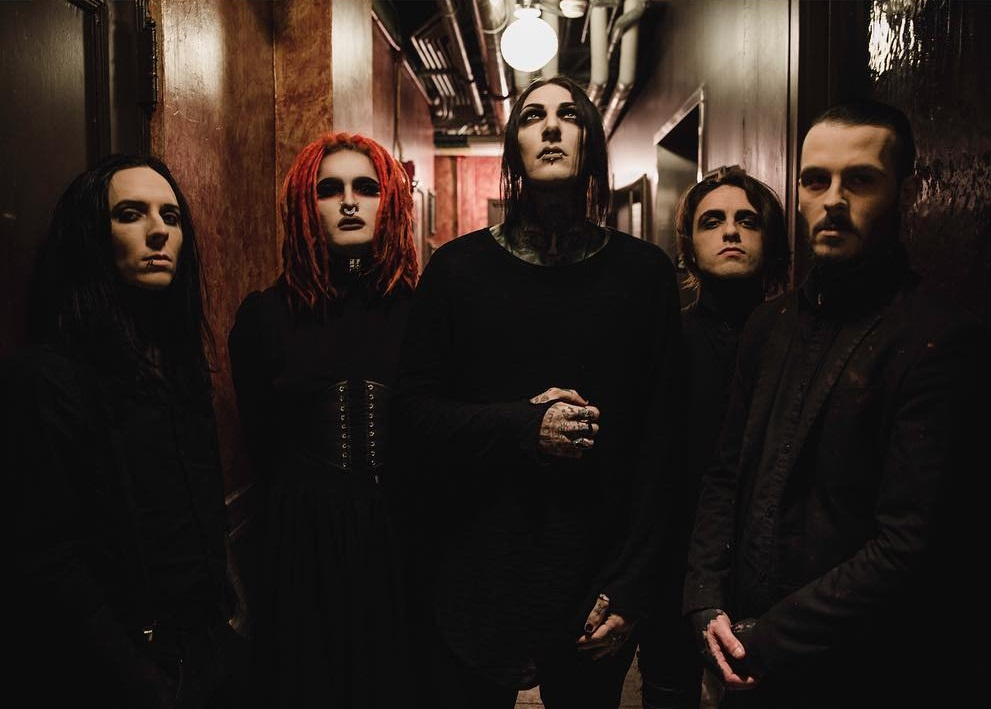
- Studio albums: 7
- Extended plays: 4
- Singles: 38
- Music videos: 26
- Demos: 1

Motionless in White is an American metalcore band. The discography of the group consists of seven full-length albums, four EPs and one demo album. The group is known to combine the metalcore musical style with industrial and gothic influences. The band recorded their demo in 2005 as a four-piece band, and released their debut EP, The Whorror, under small independent label Masquerade Recordings in 2007 when the group achieved a six-member line-up.

During the EP recording of When Love Met Destruction, the band signed to Fearless Records where they released their major label debut, Creatures afterward in 2010. The band released their second studio album, Infamous, on November 13, 2012. The band released their third studio album Reincarnate on September 16, 2014. The band signed to Roadrunner Records where they released their fourth studio album Graveyard Shift on May 5, 2017. Their fifth album Disguise was released on June 7, 2019. Their sixth album Scoring the End of the World was released on June 10, 2022. Their seventh album Decades was released on July 17, 2026.

== Albums ==
=== Studio albums ===
List of studio albums, with selected chart positions and sales
Title	Album details	Peak chart positions										Sales
Title	Album details	US	US Hard Rock	AUS	AUT	CAN	GER	NZ	SCO	SWI	UK	Sales
Creatures	Released: October 12, 2010; Label: Fearless; Format: CD, DL, LP	175	18	—	—	—	—	—	—	—	—	
Infamous	Released: November 13, 2012; Label: Fearless; Format: CD, DL, LP	53	5	—	—	—	—	—	—	—	—	US: 83,000
Reincarnate	Released: September 16, 2014; Label: Fearless; Format: CD, DL, LP	9	1	19	—	20	—	—	37	—	43	US: 31,000
Graveyard Shift	Released: May 5, 2017; Label: Roadrunner; Format: CD, DL, LP	27	1	35	—	83	88	—	47	99	72	
Disguise	Released: June 7, 2019; Label: Roadrunner; Format: CD, DL, LP	27	2	32	69	—	—	—	71	65	98	US: 18,700
Scoring the End of the World	Released: June 10, 2022; Label: Roadrunner; Format: CD, CS, DL, LP	12	1	14	36	44	30	—	—	87	92	US: 406,000
Decades	Released: July 17, 2026; Label: Roadrunner; Format: CD, CS, DL, LP	15	1	5	5	83	7	38	7	15	31	US: 29,500
"—" denotes a recording that did not chart or was not released in that territory.

=== Demos ===
Title	Details
Motionless in White	Released: September 1, 2005; Label: self-released

== Extended plays ==
Title	Details
The Whorror	Released: July 3, 2007; Label: Masquerade; Format: CD
When Love Met Destruction	Released: February 17, 2009; Label: Tragic Hero, Fearless; Format: CD, DL, LP
Another Life / Eternally Yours: Motion Picture Collection	Released: August 10, 2020; Label: Roadrunner; Format: DL
Reincarnate: 10 Year Anniversary - EP	Released: September 13, 2024; Label: Stem Disintermedia, Inc.; Format: DL

== Singles ==
List of singles, with selected chart positions, showing year released and album name
Title	Year	Peak chart positions						Certifications	Album
Title	Year	US Hard Rock	US Main.	US Rock	US Rock Airplay	NZ Hot	UK Dig.	Certifications	Album
"Ghost in the Mirror"	2009	—	—	—	—	—	—		When Love Met Destruction
"Abigail" (featuring Nick Brooks)	2010	—	—	—	—	—	—		Creatures
"Creatures"	2011	—	—	—	—	—	—		Creatures
"Immaculate Misconception"	2011	—	—	—	—	—	—		Creatures
"Puppets (The First Snow)"	2012	—	—	—	—	—	—		Creatures
"Creatures" (Celldweller "Beauty" Remix)	2012	—	—	—	—	—	—		Creatures (Deluxe Edition)
"Devil's Night"	2012	—	—	—	—	—	—		Infamous
"If It's Dead, We'll Kill It" (featuring Brandan Schieppati)	2012	—	—	—	—	—	—		Infamous
"A-M-E-R-I-C-A" (featuring Michael Vampire)	2013	—	30	—	—	—	—		Infamous
"Du hast" (Rammstein cover)	2014	—	—	—	—	—	—		Punk Goes 90s Vol. 2
"Reincarnate"	2014	—	24	— (Note: "Reincarnate" did not enter the US Billboard Hot Rock Songs chart, but peaked at number 44 on the US Rock Digital Song Sales chart.)	—	—	—		Reincarnate
"Puppets 3 (The Grand Finale)" (featuring Dani Filth)	2014	—	—	—	—	—	—		Reincarnate
"Dead as Fuck"	2014	—	—	—	—	—	—		Reincarnate
"Break the Cycle"	2015	—	—	—	—	—	—		Reincarnate
"Unstoppable"	2015	—	39	—	—	—	—		Reincarnate
"570"	2016	—	—	—	—	—	—		Graveyard Shift
"Eternally Yours"	2017	—	—	36	— (Note: "Eternally Yours" did not enter the US Billboard Rock & Alternative Airplay chart, but peaked at number 15 on the US Rock Digital Song Sales chart.)	—	—		Graveyard Shift
"Loud (Fuck It)"	2017	—	18	—	—	—	—		Graveyard Shift
"Rats"	2017	—	—	—	—	—	—		Graveyard Shift
"Necessary Evil" (featuring Jonathan Davis)	2017	—	29	—	—	—	—		Graveyard Shift
"Voices"	2018	—	28	—	—	—	—	RIAA: Gold	Graveyard Shift
"Disguise"	2019	—	—	—	—	—	—		Disguise
"Brand New Numb"	2019	—	22	—	—	—	—		Disguise
"Undead Ahead 2: The Tale of the Midnight Ride"	2019	—	—	—	—	—	—		Disguise
"Another Life"	2020	10	14	35	41	—	—	RIAA: Gold	Disguise
"Somebody Told Me" (The Killers cover)	2020	15	32	— (Note: "Somebody Told Me" did not enter the US Billboard Hot Rock Songs chart, but peaked at number 21 on the US Rock Digital Song Sales chart.)	— (Note: "Somebody Told Me" did not enter the US Billboard Rock & Alternative Airplay chart, but peaked at number 21 on the US Alternative Digital Songs Sales chart.)	—	—		Non-album singles
"Creatures X: To the Grave"	2020	20	—	—	—	—	—		Non-album singles
"Timebomb"	2021	6	—	— (Note: "Timebomb" did not enter the US Billboard Hot Rock Songs chart, but peaked at number 8 on the US Rock Digital Song Sales chart.)	—	—	—		Non-album singles
"Cyberhex" (featuring Lindsay Schoolcraft)	2022	8	—	46	— (Note: "Cyberhex" did not enter the US Billboard Rock & Alternative Airplay chart, but peaked at number 10 on the US Rock Digital Song Sales chart.)	—	—		Scoring the End of the World
"Masterpiece"	2022	5	1	32	13	—	—		Scoring the End of the World
"Slaughterhouse" (featuring Bryan Garris)	2022	10	—	—	—	—	—		Scoring the End of the World
"Scoring the End of the World" (featuring Mick Gordon)	2022	12	—	— (Note: "Scoring the End of the World" did not enter the US Billboard Hot Rock Songs chart, but peaked at number 24 on the US Rock Digital Song Sales chart.)	—	—	—		Scoring the End of the World
"Werewolf"	2022	16	10	—	29	—	—		Scoring the End of the World
"Sign of Life"	2023	15	8	—	30	—	—		Scoring the End of the World
"Afraid of the Dark"	2026	1	—	22	—	35	60		Decades
"Playing God" (featuring Corey Taylor)	2026	1	—	— (Note: "Playing God" did not enter the US Billboard Hot Rock Songs chart, but peaked at number 9 on the US Rock Digital Song Sales chart.)	—	—	—		Decades
"R.I.P." (featuring Skylar Grey)	2026	1	1	47	14	—	—		Decades
"Fight Like Hell" (original or featuring Outlier)	2026	1	—	—	—	—	—		Decades
"—" denotes a recording that did not chart or was not released in that territory.

=== As featured artist ===
List of singles as featured artist, with selected chart positions and certifications, showing year released and album name
Title	Year	Album
"Nothing Ever After" (Illenium and Motionless in White)	2023	Illenium

=== Promotional singles ===
List of promotional singles, with selected chart positions, showing year released and album name
Title	Year	Peak chart positions	Album
Title	Year	US Main. Rock	Album
"London in Terror"	2010	—	Creatures
"City Lights"	2010	—	Creatures
"Cobwebs" (featuring Andre Bravo)	2010	—	Creatures
"—" denotes a recording that did not chart or was not released in that territory.

== Other charted songs ==
List of charted songs, with selected chart positions, showing year released and album name
Title	Year	Peak chart positions	Album
Title	Year	US Hard Rock	Album
"Meltdown"	2022	22	Scoring the End of the World
"Decades"	2026	8	Decades
"Log In//Crash Out"	2026	10	Decades
"All That I've Ever Known"	2026	13	Decades
"Blood Rave" (featuring Anthony Martinez)	2026	11	Decades
"Love At First Bite"	2026	15	Decades
"Count Back To Zero"	2026	16	Decades
"Blood Pact"	2026	19	Decades
"Sunglasses at Night" (Corey Hart cover)	2026	9	Decades

== Non-album tracks ==
Title	Year	Album
"Iris" (Goo Goo Dolls cover)	2006	Non-album single
"My Friend of Misery" (Metallica cover)	2012	Kerrang!'s Black Album Covered
"Demon In Your Dreams" (entrance music for WWE wrestler Rhea Ripley)	2022	Non-album single

== Music videos ==
Title	Year	Director	Album
"Ghost in the Mirror"	2009	Scott Hansen	When Love Met Destruction
"Abigail"	2010	Kevin McVey	Creatures
"Creatures"	2011	Stephen Penta	Creatures
"Immaculate Misconception"	2011	Cody Blue Snider	Creatures
"Puppets (The First Snow)"	2012	Unknown	Creatures
"Devil's Night"	2012	Cody Blue Snider	Infamous
"A-M-E-R-I-C-A"	2013	Shawn "Clown" Crahan	Infamous
"Reincarnate"	2014	Chad Michael Ward	Reincarnate
"Dead as Fuck"	2014	Dan Centrone	Reincarnate
"Break the Cycle"	2015	The Widow Brothers	Reincarnate
"570"	2016	Jeremy Danger and Travis Shinn	Graveyard Shift
"Loud (Fuck It)"	2017	Jeremy Danger and Travis Shinn	Graveyard Shift
"Eternally Yours"	2017	Jeremy Danger and Travis Shinn	Graveyard Shift
"Necessary Evil"	2017	Max Moore	Graveyard Shift
"Voices"	2018	Jeremy Danger and Travis Shinn	Graveyard Shift
"Disguise"	2019	Jeremy Danger and Travis Shinn	Disguise
"Undead Ahead 2: The Tale of the Midnight Ride"	2019	Toon53 Productions	Disguise
"Brand New Numb"	2019	Max Moore	Disguise
"Another Life"	2019	Max Moore	Disguise
"Thoughts & Prayers"	2021	Ricky Olson	Disguise
"</c0de>"	2021	Vince Dwyer	Disguise
"Masterpiece"	2022	Max Moore	Scoring the End of the World
"Werewolf"	2022	Jensen Noen	Scoring the End of the World
"Sign of Life"	2023	Jensen Noen	Scoring the End of the World
"Afraid of the Dark"	2026	Max Moore	Decades
"R.I.P."	2026	Jensen Noen	Decades
