= WLMD =

WLMD may refer to:

- WLMD (FM), a radio station (104.7 FM) licensed to serve Bushnell, Illinois, United States
- WACA (AM), a radio station (900 AM) licensed to Laurel, Maryland, United States, which used the call sign WLMD until December 1985
- Windows Live Mail Desktop
- When Love Met Destruction, album/EP by the band Motionless in White
