= The Whorror =

EP by Motionless in White
- Released: July 3, 2007
- Recorded: 2007
- Genres: Metalcore; post-hardcore
- Length: 22:38
- Label: Masquerade Recordings

Motionless in White chronology
Motionless in White (2005)	The Whorror (2007)	When Love Met Destruction (2009)

The Whorror is the first EP by American metalcore band Motionless in White. It was released on July 3, 2007, through Masquerade Recordings.

== Track listing ==
All songs written by Chris "Motionless" Cerulli.

No.	Title	Length
1.	"The Whorror"	0:51
2.	"Just When You Thought We Couldn't Get Any More Emo, We Go and Pull a Stunt Like This"	3:34
3.	"She Never Made It to the Emergency Room"	4:04
4.	"We Put the Fun in Funeral"	2:19
5.	"Black"	2:18
6.	"Apocolips"	5:07
7.	"Schitzophrenicannibalisticsexfest.com"	4:18
Total length:		22:41

Alternate track list

No.	Title	Length
1.	"The Whorror"	0:51
2.	"Schitzophrenicannibalisticsexfest.com"	4:18
3.	"She Never Made It to the Emergency Room"	4:04
4.	"We Put the Fun in Funeral"	2:19
5.	"Just When You Thought We Couldn't Get Any More Emo, We Go and Pull a Stunt Like This"	3:34
6.	"Black"	2:15
7.	"Apocolips"	5:07
Total length:		22:38

== Personnel ==
Motionless in White

- Chris "Motionless" Cerulli – lead vocals
- Mike Costanza – lead guitar
- Thomas "TJ" Bell – rhythm guitar, co-lead vocals
- Frank Polumbo – bass
- Josh Balz – keyboards, backing vocals
- Angelo Parente – drums

== Trivia ==
- "She Never Made It to the Emergency Room" and "Apocolips" were re-recorded for the full-length version of When Love Met Destruction.
- A sequel to "Schitzophrenicannibalisticsexfest.com", entitled ".Com Pt. II", was recorded for the album Creatures.
- "Apocolips" was referenced in the chorus of the song "Cyberhex" from the album Scoring the End of the World.
