= Another Life (Motionless in White song) =

2019 single by Motionless in White

Single by Motionless in White

from the album Disguise
- Released: January 21, 2020
- Recorded: 2018
- Genre: Post-grunge
- Length: 3:25
- Label: Roadrunner
- Songwriters: Chris "Motionless" Cerulli; Drew Fulk; Josh Strock
- Producers: Drew Fulk; Chris "Motionless" Cerulli

Motionless in White singles chronology
"Undead Ahead 2: The Tale of the Midnight Ride" (2019)	"Another Life" (2020)	"Somebody Told Me" (2020)

Music video
- "Another Life" on YouTube

"Another Life" is a song by American metalcore band Motionless in White. Written by vocalist Chris "Motionless" Cerulli, Drew Fulk, and Josh Strock, it was produced by Drew Fulk and Cerulli himself and featured on the band's 2019 fifth studio album Disguise. The song was also released as the fourth single from the album on January 21, 2020.

== Composition and lyrics ==
"Another Life" was written by Chris "Motionless" Cerulli, Drew Fulk and Josh Strock and composed by the band. The song is a prequel to "Eternally Yours" from their previous album Graveyard Shift. These two songs talk about two people who meet and fall in love in a "metaphorical afterlife", which symbolizes the ability to love someone else after a painful loss loving ("Eternally Yours"), and the pain they had to endure to get over the previous relationship and be able to love each other ("Another Life").

== Music video ==
The music video for "Another Life" was released on December 4, 2019 before the song became an official single a month later. Directed by Max Moore, the video shows a man remembering the best moments with his former partner after their breakup; played by Stitch D of the Defiled fame and current Lowlives frontman and his real life wife, Nina Kate respectively.

== Other versions ==
On May 1, 2020 the band released a remix of the song made by Beartooth vocalist and former Attack Attack! vocalist Caleb Shomo. On August 10, 2020, the band released an EP that included a reimagined version of the song in collaboration with Estonian singer Kerli.

== Personnel ==
- Chris "Motionless" Cerulli – lead vocals
- Ryan Sitkowski – lead guitar
- Ricky "Horror" Olson – rhythm guitar, backing vocals, bass
- Tom Hane – drums

== Charts ==
Chart performance for "Another Life"
Chart (2020)	Peak position
US Hot Rock & Alternative Songs (Billboard)	35
US Rock & Alternative Airplay (Billboard)	41

== Certifications ==
Certifications and sales for "Another Life"
Region	Certification	Certified units/sales
United States (RIAA)	Gold	500,000^{‡}
^{‡} Sales+streaming figures based on certification alone.
