= Voices (Motionless in White song) =

2018 single by Motionless in White

Single by Motionless in White

from the album Graveyard Shift
- Released: May 23, 2018
- Length: 3:44
- Label: Roadrunner
- Songwriters: Chris "Motionless" Cerulli; Joshua Landry; Johnny Andrews; Drew Fulk; Josh Strock
- Producers: Drew Fulk; Chris "Motionless" Cerulli

Motionless in White singles chronology
"Necessary Evil" (2017)	"Voices" (2018)	"Disguise" (2019)

Music video
- "Voices" on YouTube

"Voices" is a song by American metalcore band Motionless in White. Written by vocalist Chris "Motionless" Cerulli, Joshua Landry, Johnny Andrews, Drew Fulk, and Josh Strock, it was produced by Drew Fulk and Cerulli himself and featured on the band's 2017 fourth studio album Graveyard Shift. The song was also released as the sixth and final single from the album on May 23, 2018.

== Composition and lyrics ==
"Voices" was written by Chris "Motionless" Cerulli, Drew Fulk, Johnny Andrews, Joshua Landry and Josh Strock and composed by the band. The song talks about everything that goes on in your head like the voices you hear and the demons you fight.

== Music video ==
The music video for "Voices" was released on the same day as the single was streamed. Directed by Jeremy Danger and Travis Shinn, the video shows the band members wrestling with their multiple personalities.

== Personnel ==
Credits retrieved from AllMusic.

Motionless in White

- Chris "Motionless" Cerulli – lead vocals
- Ryan Sitkowski – lead guitar
- Ricky "Horror" Olson – rhythm guitar, backing vocals
- Devin "Ghost" Sola – bass, backing vocals
- Josh Balz – keyboards, backing vocals

Additional musicians

- Tom Hane – drums

== Charts ==
Chart performance for "Voices"
Chart (2018)	Peak position
US Mainstream Rock Airplay (Billboard)	28

== Certifications ==
Certifications and sales for "Voices"
Region	Certification	Certified units/sales
United States (RIAA)	Gold	500,000^{‡}
^{‡} Sales+streaming figures based on certification alone.

== In popular culture ==
- The song featured in the promo of Aleister Black vs. Johnny Gargano for NXT TakeOver: WarGames (2018) as a theme song for the event.
- It was also used by WWE in Randy Orton's 20th Anniversary Celebration video package on WWE Raw on April 25, 2022.
