= Playing God (Motionless in White song) =

2026 single by Motionless in White

Single by Motionless in White featuring Corey Taylor

from the album Decades
- Released: May 6, 2026
- Genre: Metalcore; nu metal; black metal; djent
- Length: 3:40
- Label: Roadrunner
- Songwriters: Chris "Motionless" Cerulli; Drew Fulk; Evan McKeever; Justin DeBlieck; Stephen Sopchak; Tom Hane
- Producers: Drew Fulk; Justin DeBlieck

Motionless in White singles chronology
"Afraid of the Dark" (2026)	"Playing God" (2026)	"R.I.P." (2026)

Corey Taylor singles chronology
"70% Dead" (2024)	"Playing God" (2026)

Lyric video
- "Playing God" on YouTube

"Playing God" is a song by American metalcore band Motionless in White, featuring Corey Taylor of Slipknot. Written by vocalist Chris "Motionless" Cerulli, Drew Fulk, Evan McKeever, Justin DeBlieck, Stephen Sopchak, and Tom Hane, it was produced by Fulk and DeBlieck. The song was released on May 6, 2026, through Roadrunner Records, and was the second single for the band's seventh studio album, Decades.

== Background and release ==
On May 4, 2026, the band teased on social media that their next single would feature guest vocals, be a sequel to a previous song, and be titled "Playing God". The song released on May 6, featuring vocals from Corey Taylor of Slipknot, and coincided with the announcement of the album, Decades. The song is a sequel to "Soft", from their fourth studio album Graveyard Shift. Lyrically, the song is themed around Cerulli's thoughts on social media and toxic internet culture.

== Live performances ==
The song debuted live on June 24, 2026, in Melbourne, Australia, during the band's Afraid of the Dark Tour, with Brian Wille of Currents filling in Taylor's vocals.

== Composition ==
"Playing God" has been described as metalcore, nu metal, black metal, and djent.

== Personnel ==
Credits adapted from Tidal.

Motionless in White

- Chris "Motionless" Cerulli – vocals
- Ryan Sitkowski – lead guitar
- Ricky "Horror" Olson – rhythm guitar
- Justin Morrow – bass
- Vinny Mauro – drums

Additional personnel

- Corey Taylor – guest vocals
- Justin DeBlieck – production
- Drew Fulk – production
- Zakk Cervini – mixing, mastering
- Josh Strock – programming
- Tom Hane – programming, cover art

== Charts ==
Chart performance for "Playing God"
Chart (2026)	Peak position
US Hot Hard Rock Songs (Billboard)	1
US Rock Digital Song Sales (Billboard)	9
