= R.I.P. (Motionless in White song) =

2026 single by Motionless in White

Single by Motionless in White featuring Skylar Grey

from the album Decades
- Released: June 17, 2026
- Genre: Hard rock; gothic metal
- Length: 4:00
- Label: Roadrunner
- Songwriters: Chris "Motionless" Cerulli; Danny Majic; Drew Fulk; Elliott Taylor; Jim Levine; Josh Strock; Justin DeBlieck; Skylar Grey; Stephen Sopchak
- Producers: Drew Fulk; Justin DeBlieck

Motionless in White singles chronology
"Playing God" (2026)	"R.I.P." (2026)

Skylar Grey singles chronology
"Bullshit" (2024)	"R.I.P." (2026)

Music video
- "R.I.P." on YouTube

"R.I.P." is a song by American metalcore band Motionless in White, featuring Skylar Grey. Written by vocalist Chris "Motionless" Cerulli, Danny Majic, Drew Fulk, Elliott Taylor, Jim Levine, Josh Strock, Justin DeBlieck, Skylar Grey, and Stephen Sopchak, it was produced by Fulk and DeBlieck. The song was released on June 17, 2026, through Roadrunner Records, and was the third single for the band's seventh studio album, Decades. The single peaked at number one on the Billboard Hot Hard Rock Songs and Mainstream Rock Airplay charts.

== Background and release ==
On June 16, 2026, the band announced that the third single for their upcoming album Decades, titled "R.I.P.", would release the following day. The song released June 17, alongside its music video directed by Jensen Noen.

Speaking about the song, Cerulli said that Grey's vocals "brought it [the song] to another level," and also noted that the lyrics, which touch on the loss of a relationship, were originally written "through a romantic lens" but could be broadened to other types of relationships.

== Live performances ==
The song debuted live with Skylar Grey on July 14, 2026, at the Hartford HealthCare Amphitheater in Bridgeport, Connecticut, during the band's first show of their Sweat and Blood North American tour.

== Composition ==
"R.I.P." has been called a ballad, and has been further described as hard rock, and gothic metal. The song has also been described as "a lover's lament inscribed on a headstone".

== Music video ==
The music video was released on June 17, 2026, and was directed by Jensen Noen. The video depicts two people laying atop stone tombs in a cathedral beside one another.

== Personnel ==
Credits adapted from Tidal.

Motionless in White

- Chris "Motionless" Cerulli – vocals
- Ryan Sitkowski – lead guitar
- Ricky "Horror" Olson – rhythm guitar
- Justin Morrow – bass
- Vinny Mauro – drums

Additional personnel

- Skylar Grey – guest vocals
- Justin DeBlieck – production
- Drew Fulk – production
- Luc Alexiades – mixing
- Zakk Cervini – mixing, mastering
- Josh Strock – programming
- Tom Hane – cover art

== Charts ==
Chart performance for "R.I.P."
Chart (2026)	Peak position
US Hot Rock & Alternative Songs (Billboard)	47
US Rock & Alternative Airplay (Billboard)	14
