= Masterpiece (Motionless in White song) =

Single by Motionless in White

from the album Scoring the End of the World
- Released: April 14, 2022
- Length: 3:26
- Label: Roadrunner
- Songwriters: Chris "Motionless" Cerulli; Justin deBlieck; Drew Fulk; Steve Sopchak; Erik Ron
- Producers: Drew Fulk; Justin deBlieck

Motionless in White singles chronology
"Cyberhex" (2022)	"Masterpiece" (2022)	"Slaughterhouse" (2022)

Music video
- "Masterpiece" on YouTube

"Masterpiece" is a song by American metalcore band Motionless in White. Written by vocalist Chris "Motionless" Cerulli, Justin deBlieck, Drew Fulk, Steve Sopchak, and Erik Ron, it was produced by Drew Fulk and Justin deBlieck and featured on the band's 2022 sixth studio album Scoring the End of the World. The song was also released as the second single from the album on April 14, 2022. The single became the band's first song to reach number one on the Billboard Mainstream Rock Airplay chart.

== Promotion and release ==
The song was released on April 14, 2022 as the second single from Motionless in White's sixth studio album Scoring the End of the World. The band released a reimagined version of the song on August 26, 2022 called "Masterpiece: Motion Picture Collection".

== Composition and lyrics ==
"Masterpiece" was written by Chris "Motionless" Cerulli, Justin deBlieck, Drew Fulk, Steve Sopchak, and Erik Ron and composed by the band. The song has been described as a "heavy ballad". In a press release, Cerulli said:

"Masterpiece is a song which I feel embodies the raw and brutally honest nature of what makes Motionless in White. It took me many years to fully recognise that these are the types of songs that truly are the lifeblood of the relationship between the band and our fans. There is something really powerful and magical in being able to write a song that not only expresses your own deepest emotions and feelings, but to write something that may express the feelings of those who find it hard to articulate their own at times. It is on another level of special. In my own experience as a listener, these types of songs have always offered comfort amidst the pain, and Masterpiece is my way of returning that energy back to the universe for others to potentially find and carry with them. We're all going through something dark in our heads on a daily basis, so why not go through it together?"

== Music video ==
The music video for "Masterpiece" was released on the same day as the single was streamed. Directed by Max Moore, the video show the band in an abandoned home, sifting through tokens of a lost past until a cathartic blaze burns it all down.

== Personnel ==
- Chris "Motionless" Cerulli – lead vocals
- Ryan Sitkowski – lead guitar
- Ricky "Horror" Olson – rhythm guitar, backing vocals
- Justin Morrow – bass, backing vocals
- Vinny Mauro – drums, percussion

== Charts ==
=== Weekly charts ===
Weekly chart performance for "Masterpiece"
Chart (2022)	Peak position
US Digital Song Sales (Billboard)	37
US Hot Rock & Alternative Songs (Billboard)	32
US Rock & Alternative Airplay (Billboard)	13

=== Year-end charts ===
Year-end chart performance for "Masterpiece"
Chart (2022)	Position
US Hot Hard Rock Songs (Billboard)	12
US Mainstream Rock (Billboard)	3

== See also ==
- List of Billboard Mainstream Rock number-one songs of the 2020s
