= Decades (Motionless in White album) =

Studio album by Motionless in White
- Released: July 17, 2026
- Recorded: 2024–2026
- Studios: Syracuse, New York; Los Angeles, California
- Genres: Metalcore; melodic metalcore; alternative metal; hard rock
- Length: 53:47
- Label: Roadrunner
- Producers: Drew Fulk; Justin DeBlieck

Motionless in White chronology
Scoring the End of the World (2022)	Decades (2026)

Singles from Decades
- 1. "Afraid of the Dark" Released: January 28, 2026; 2. "Playing God" Released: May 6, 2026; 3. "R.I.P." Released: June 17, 2026; 4. "Fight Like Hell" Released: July 17, 2026

Decades is the seventh studio album by American metalcore band Motionless in White. It was released on July 17, 2026, through Roadrunner Records. The album was produced by Drew Fulk and Justin DeBlieck.

== Background and promotion ==
In August 2024, the band announced they had begun writing and recording a follow-up to Scoring the End of the World, but stated they would be "taking their time with it" to "write the coolest record" they could, originally aiming for a release in 2025. The album was recorded in Upstate New York and Los Angeles.

In November 2025, they announced while performing in Wilkes-Barre, that they would be releasing their first song in 4 years, and the album's first single, "Afraid of the Dark", in January 2026. The single released on January 28, 2026, and later became the band's first song to reach number one on the Billboard Hot Hard Rock Songs chart.

In early May, the band announced via social media they had finished working on the album and teased that the next single to release, "Playing God", would feature a surprise guest. "Playing God" was released on May 6, featuring Corey Taylor of Slipknot, alongside the announcement of the album's details including its title, Decades, and release date, July 17, 2026. The album's name was chosen as 2026 marks the band's 20th anniversary.

On June 17, the band released the third single, "R.I.P.", featuring guest vocals from Skylar Grey.

Three days before the album's release, on July 14, the band performed the first show of their Sweat and Blood North American tour, and debuted live performances of "R.I.P." and their cover of '80s synth-pop song "Sunglasses at Night" by Corey Hart. Cerulli had previously stated on a podcast with drummer Craig Reynolds that the cover was something he wanted to "do more than anything in the world," calling the song an "'80s icon song".

On the album's release date of July 17, the band also released "Fight Like Hell" as a single.

== Composition ==
Decades has been described by critics as metalcore, melodic metalcore, alt metal, and hard rock, with elements of nu-metal, and djent, and influences from electronic, gothic, and industrial music.

== Critical reception ==
Professional ratings
Review scores
Source	Rating
AllMusic	4/5 stars
Blabbermouth.net	9/10
Boolin Tunes	6.5/10
Distorted Sound	8/10
Kerrang!	4/5
Metal Hammer	4/5 stars
Out of Rage	9/10
Sputnikmusic	1.5/5
Wall of Sound	6.5/10

Decades received generally favorable reviews from critics.

Steve Beebee of Kerrang! praised the album, noting on its blend of genres, calling the album "kooky fun" and writing that it "is simply a celebration of all they do best". Kris Peters of Heavy Magazine, while not providing a summative analysis of the whole album, praised many of the album's tracks. Writing for Out of Rage, Zuzanna Pazola said the album "elebrates the band's past by proving they're still evolving", praising the band's refinement over the years. Tim Finch of The Razor's Edge said the band were "stepping up their game" praising the contrast between the album's heavier and softer songs. Anne Erickson of Blabbermouth.net also praised the album with a 9 out of 10 score, praising Motionless in White for not "playing it safe" and described the album as "darker, bigger and more adventurous, which says a lot coming from a group as adventures as they are." In a four star review for Metal Hammer, Dannii Leivers praised the album for its dark humour, summed up the album as "fun, memorable, satisfying" and expressed that it "feels like them".

Luke Nuttall of The Soundboard gave a fairly neutral review, stating the album "isn't the greatest hits album that its name implies, but is representative of the core spread that makes up Motionless in White". Adam Rice of Wall of Sound was slightly more critical, stating the increased use of electronics "hasn't won me over" though called it "ambitious" nonetheless, and praising some tracks for their lyrical content and industrial elements. Dean B. of Boolin Tunes's review was mixed stating he thought the band were "falling into a trap of their own repetition", writing that he felt the album's "twists and turns" became too cyclical.

In a negative review for Sputnikmusic, Caleb Robinson called the album a "misguided, directionless mess". He praised the opening track "Decades", but criticized the songs after for being "formulaic" and "suffer from the same fault of featuring cartoonishly macho, faux tough guy lyrics".

== Track listing ==
All tracks are written by Chris "Motionless" Cerulli and Justin DeBlieck, except "Sunglasses at Night", with additional writers where noted.

Decades track listing
No.	Title	Writer(s)	Length
1.	"Decades"	Drew Fulk; Steve Sopchak; Tom Hane	3:51
2.	"Log In//Crash Out"	Fulk; John Sustar; Justin Spaulding; Sopchak	3:51
3.	"R.I.P." (featuring Skylar Grey)	Danny Majic; Fulk; Elliott Taylor; Jim Levine; Josh Strock; Skylar Grey; Sopchak	4:00
4.	"Fight Like Hell"	Ali Theodore; Anthony Mirabella; Bianca Sperduti; Brandon Zemel; Erasmus Gotay; Evan McKeever; Haley Warner; James Petrie; Joey Arena; Sergio Cabral; Sopchak; Paroff	3:09
5.	"Playing God" (featuring Corey Taylor)	Fulk; McKeever; Sopchak; Hane	3:39
6.	"All That I've Ever Known"	Fulk; McKeever; Spaulding; Ryan Sitkowski; Sopchak; Hane	4:24
7.	"Blood Rave" (featuring Anthony Martinez)	Anthony Martinez; Chris Linck; Kalan Adams; Robert Lynch; Sopchak; Triston Gandia	3:35
8.	"Love at First Bite"	Arena	3:32
9.	"Count Back from Zero"	Fulk; Sopchak; Hane; Zack Jones	4:30
10.	"Blood Pact"	Justin Morrow; Fulk; Sopchak; Arena; Hane; Sustar	3:20
11.	"Afraid of the Dark"	Fulk; Sopchak; Hane; Ricky Olson	4:38
12.	"Sunglasses at Night"	Corey Hart	3:59
13.	"Hollywood" (bonus track)	Fulk; Erik Ron; Johnny Andrews	4:10
14.	"Fight Like Hell" (featuring Outlier; bonus track)	Theodore; Mirabella; Sperduti; Zemel; Gotay; McKeever; Warner; Petrie; Arena; Cabral; Sopchak; Paroff	3:09
Total length:			53:47

=== Notes ===
- "Log In//Crash Out" is stylized as "log_in//crash_out".
- "Sunglasses at Night" is a cover of the Corey Hart song.

== Personnel ==
Credits adapted from Tidal.

Motionless in White

- Chris "Motionless" Cerulli – vocals, art, art direction
- Ryan Sitkowski – lead guitar
- Ricky "Horror" Olson – rhythm guitar
- Vinny Mauro – drums
- Justin Morrow – bass

Additional musicians

- Gina DeBlieck – additional vocals (2)
- Shae Ryan – additional vocals (2, 9)
- Lex Messina – additional vocals (2, 3, 9)
- Skylar Grey – vocals (3)
- Joey Arena (of Outlier) – additional vocals (4, 8), vocals (14)
- Corey Taylor (of Slipknot) – vocals (5)
- Anthony Martinez (of Dark Divine) – vocals (7)

Additional personnel

- Justin DeBlieck – production
- Drew Fulk – production (1–3, 5–7, 9–11, 13)
- Evan McKeever – production (4, 14), additional programming (4)
- Chris Linck – production (7), additional programming (7)
- Kalan Adams – production (7), additional programming (7)
- Zakk Cervini – mastering (all tracks), mixing (all except 13, 14)
- Steve Sopchak – mixing (13, 14)
- Julian Gargiulo – mixing assistance (all except 5)
- Luc Alexiades – additional mixing (all except 5)
- Tom Hane – additional programming (1, 5), art direction
- Justin Spaulding – additional programming (2, 6)
- Josh Strock – additional programming (3, 5)
- John Sustar – additional programming (10)
- Johnny Andrews – additional programming (13)
- Norma Cabrera – creative direction
- Chris Brown – art direction
- Jonathan Weiner – photography
- Erin Nakashima – make-up
- Laura Lomonaco – make-up
- Tara Rey – make-up

== Charts ==
Chart performance for Decades
Chart (2026)	Peak position
Australian Albums (ARIA)	5
Austrian Albums (Ö3 Austria)	5
Belgian Albums (Ultratop Flanders)	32
Belgian Albums (Ultratop Wallonia)	19
Canadian Albums (Billboard)	83
Croatian International Albums (HDU)	10
Dutch Albums (Album Top 100)	69
Finnish Albums (Suomen virallinen lista)	33
French Albums (SNEP)	73
French Rock & Metal Albums (SNEP)	5
German Albums (Offizielle Top 100)	7
German Rock & Metal Albums (Offizielle Top 100)	3
Hungarian Physical Albums (MAHASZ)	15
Japanese Download Albums (Billboard Japan)	73
New Zealand Albums (RMNZ)	38
Portuguese Albums (AFP)	123
Scottish Albums (Official Charts)	7
Spanish Albums (Promusicae)	75
Swedish Hard Rock Albums (Sverigetopplistan)	20
Swiss Albums (Schweizer Hitparade)	15
UK Albums (Official Charts)	31
UK Rock & Metal Albums (Official Charts)	1
US Billboard 200	15
US Top Rock & Alternative Albums (Billboard)	5
