= Infamous (Motionless in White album) =

Studio album by Motionless in White
- Released: November 13, 2012
- Genres: Industrial metal; gothic metal; metalcore
- Length: 46:38
- Label: Fearless
- Producers: Jason Suecof; Tim Sköld

Motionless in White chronology
Creatures (2010)	Infamous (2012)	Reincarnate (2014)

Singles from Infamous
- 1. "Devil's Night" Released: September 25, 2012; 2. "If It's Dead, We'll Kill It" Released: October 9, 2012; 3. "A-M-E-R-I-C-A" Released: April 23, 2013

Infamous is the second studio album by American metalcore band Motionless in White. It was released on November 13, 2012, through Fearless Records and was produced by Jason Suecof and Tim Sköld. The album's track-listing was revealed on September 20, 2012. The album leaked on October 8, 2012, more than one month before its planned release, causing a huge discussion among the band's fanbase. The album was also the last release from the band to feature long time drummer and co-founder of the band, Angelo Parente.

== Composition ==
=== Influences and style ===
The album abandons the metalcore sound and is the band's most diverse work so far, drawing influences from various styles of music such as Slipknot, Marilyn Manson, Nine Inch Nails, Korn, Cradle of Filth, Bleeding Through, Rob Zombie, KMFDM, As I Lay Dying, AFI, Linkin Park, and Rammstein - compared to the breakdown filled metalcore effort of their debut. In an interview with Metal Hammer UK, Chris "Motionless" Cerulli states that although he has enjoyed working within the metalcore genre, he and the band aim to develop their sound to prevent it from becoming too generic; Infamous has been their first step toward achieving this goal. In the same article, Cerulli talks about the sound on Creatures stating that their aim was to "take the (metalcore) genre and put twists on it and re-invent what it means to be this sort of band." He also claims that the band are through with making music in the metalcore style as he states that the Infamous album was to "get them out of a genre which has become repetitive monotonous bullshit."

== Release and promotion ==
On October 9, 2012, a lyric video for the single "If It's Dead, We'll Kill It" was released. The video is full of old black and white horror movie clips and references, as well as live shots from the band's first UK headlining tour. On November 13, 2012, a music video was released for the single "Devil's Night". It was shot by Cody Blue Snider, who also directed the previous music video, "Immaculate Misconception", from their debut album, Creatures. On January 9, 2013, the band released a live music video for the opening track on Infamous, "Black Damask (The Fog)". It is compiled of live shots from their first North American headlining tour, "The Infamous Tour".

On April 23, 2013, a lyric video was released for the single "A-M-E-R-I-C-A", which had also introduced the new drummer, Brandon Richter, formally from the band The Witch Was Right. He was to replace founding member, Angelo Parente who had left the band for personal reasons in early March. An official music video for the single "A-M-E-R-I-C-A", which was directed by Shawn "Clown" Crahan of Slipknot, was released on June 3, with a deluxe edition of Infamous released on June 11, containing remixes of several tracks, two new songs as well as the album as a whole being completely redone. "Sick from the Melt", the thirteenth track on the deluxe version of the album, features Trevor Friedrich, percussionist of Combichrist and the vocalist of The Witch Was Right, now-percussionist Brandon Richter's former band. Combichrist also remixed the track "Sinematic".

== Critical reception ==
Professional ratings
Review scores
Source	Rating
Alternative Press	5/5 stars
Kerrang!	4/5 stars
Revolver	3.5/5 stars
Sputnikmusic	4/5 stars
Ultimate Guitar	7.7 stars on a 10 point scale

Infamous has received positive reviews from contemporary music critics. Alternative Press gave Infamous 5 out of 5 stars, saying that "Motionless In White have definitely proven their point and carried it out well" and that it sounds similar to Marilyn Manson and label mates The Word Alive. Kerrang! gave Infamous 4/5 K's, saying the album "sounds like the album Manson's Born Villain should have been", and that "this ambitious Frankenstein's monster of an album will see Motionless In White become many people's new favorite band". Revolver said Infamous "rages like Bleeding Through, and stomps like vintage Manson", and "displays a compelling [musical] range for a young band", giving the album a 3.5 out of 5.

== Commercial performance ==
Infamous charted at #53 on the Billboard 200, #19 on Top Rock Albums, #9 on Top Independent Albums, and #5 on Top Hard Rock Albums. The album has sold 83,000 copies as of September 2014.

== Track listing ==
No.	Title	Writer(s)	Length
1.	"Black Damask (The Fog)"	Chris Cerulli, Mick Kenney	3:51
2.	"Devil's Night"	Cerulli, Ricky Olson, Drew Fulk, Jason Suecof	3:58
3.	"A-M-E-R-I-C-A" (featuring Michael Vampire of Vampires Everywhere!)	Cerulli	3:37
4.	"Burned at Both Ends"	Cerulli, Suecof	3:30
5.	"The Divine Infection"	Cerulli	3:38
6.	"Puppets 2 (The Rain)" (featuring Björn Strid)	Cerulli, Suecof, Olson	4:57
7.	"Sinematic"	Cerulli	4:49
8.	"If It's Dead, We'll Kill It" (featuring Brandan Schieppati)	Cerulli	3:11
9.	"Synthetic Love"	Cerulli, Suecof, Kenney	3:32
10.	"Hatefuck"	Cerulli	3:11
11.	"Underdog"	Cerulli, Suecof, Fulk, Kenney	3:56
12.	"Infamous"	Cerulli	4:23
Total length:			46:38

Deluxe edition bonus tracks
No.	Title	Length
13.	"Sick from the Melt" (featuring Trevor Friedrich of Combichrist)	3:24
14.	"Fatal"	5:19
15.	"A-M-E-R-I-C-A" (Celldweller Remix)	3:58
16.	"Underdog" (Ricky Horror Remix)	4:34
17.	"Sinematic" (Combichrist Remix)	5:02
18.	"A-M-E-R-I-C-A" (Radio Mix)	3:31
Total length:		72:26

== Personnel ==
Motionless in White

- Chris "Motionless" Cerulli – lead vocals, programming, co-production
- Ryan Sitkowski – lead guitar
- Ricky "Horror" Olson – rhythm guitar, backing vocals, programming
- Devin "Ghost" Sola – bass, backing vocals
- Josh Balz – keyboards, backing vocals
- Angelo Parente – drums
- Brandon "Rage" Richter – drums (deluxe edition)

Additional musicians

- Michael Vampire of Vampires Everywhere! – guest vocals on track 3
- Björn Strid of Soilwork – guest vocals on track 6
- Brandan Schieppati of Bleeding Through – guest vocals on track 8
- Trevor Friedrich of Combichrist – guest vocals on bonus track 13

Additional personnel

- Jason Suecof – production (tracks 1, 2, 4, 6, 8, 9, 11), additional production (tracks 3, 5), mixing
- Tim Sköld – production (tracks 3, 5, 7, 10, 12), mixing
- Eyal Levi – mixing
- Alan Douches – mastering

== Charts ==
Chart (2012)	Peak position
UK Rock & Metal Albums (Official Charts)	17
US Billboard 200	53
US Independent Albums (Billboard)	9
US Top Hard Rock Albums (Billboard)	5
US Top Rock Albums (Billboard)	19
