= Afraid of the Dark (Motionless in White song) =

2026 single by Motionless in White

Single by Motionless in White

from the album Decades
- Released: January 28, 2026
- Genre: Metalcore
- Length: 4:38
- Label: Roadrunner
- Songwriters: Chris "Motionless" Cerulli; Drew Fulk; Justin DeBlieck; Ricky "Horror" Olson; Stephen Sopchak; Tom Hane
- Producers: Drew Fulk; Justin DeBlieck

Motionless in White singles chronology
"Witness the End" (2025)	"Afraid of the Dark" (2026)	"Playing God" (2026)

Music video
- "Afraid of the Dark" on YouTube

"Afraid of the Dark" is a song by American metalcore band Motionless in White. Written by vocalist Chris "Motionless" Cerulli, Drew Fulk, Justin DeBlieck, Ricky "Horror" Olson, Stephen Sopchak, and Tom Hane, it was produced by Fulk and DeBlieck. The song was released on January 28, 2026, through Roadrunner Records, and was the first single for the band's seventh studio album, Decades. The single was also the band's first song to hit number one on the Billboard Hot Hard Rock Songs chart.

== Background and release ==
On November 13, 2025, while performing in Wilkes-Barre, Pennsylvania, the band announced they would be releasing the band's first new song in 4 years in January 2026, ahead of the band's European tour, and the release of a seventh studio album later in the year. The band released the song on January 28, 2026, marking the band's 20-year anniversary. Lyrically, the song has been described as "reflecting tough times", with numerous references to previous songs in the band's discography, with the band stating the song "unites the band's past, present and future".

== Live performances ==
The song debuted live on February 5, 2026, in Glasgow at the first show of the band's Afraid of the Dark Tour.

== Personnel ==
Credits adapted from Tidal.

Motionless in White

- Chris "Motionless" Cerulli – vocals
- Ryan Sitkowski – lead guitar
- Ricky "Horror" Olson – rhythm guitar
- Vinny Mauro – drums
- Justin Morrow – bass

Additional personnel

- Justin DeBlieck – production
- Drew Fulk – production
- Zakk Cervini – mixing, mastering
- Angelo Parente – cover art

== Charts ==
Chart performance for "Afraid of the Dark"
Chart (2026)	Peak position
US Hot Hard Rock Songs (Billboard)	1
US Hot Rock & Alternative Songs (Billboard)	22
New Zealand (Recorded Music NZ)	35
UK Singles Sales (OCC)	67
UK Singles Downloads (OCC)	60
