= Reincarnate (album) =

Album by Motionless in White

Studio album by Motionless in White
- Released: September 16, 2014
- Genres: Industrial metal; melodic metalcore; gothic metal
- Length: 55:53
- Label: Fearless
- Producers: Dan Korneff; Chris "Motionless" Cerulli

Motionless in White chronology
Infamous (2012)	Reincarnate (2014)	Graveyard Shift (2017)

Singles from Reincarnate
- 1. "Reincarnate" Released: July 8, 2014; 2. "Puppets 3 (The Grand Finale)" Released: August 5, 2014; 3. "Dead as Fuck" Released: October 31, 2014; 4. "Break the Cycle" Released: February 18, 2015; 5. "Unstoppable" Released: September 2, 2015

Reincarnate is the third studio album by American metalcore band Motionless in White. It was released on September 15, 2014, through Fearless Records in the UK and a day later worldwide. It was produced by Dan Korneff and Chris "Motionless" Cerulli. Reincarnate is the last Motionless in White album to be released on Fearless Records.

== Background and recording ==
On January 23, 2014, the band announced a short headlining tour in March with The Plot in You, Like Moths to Flames, For the Fallen Dreams, and The Defiled with For Today appearing in San Antonio. Following the tour the band entered the studio to work on their follow-up to their 2012 album, Infamous.

On April 23, the band's third studio album, Reincarnate was announced through social media, with an intended release date of September 16, 2014 worldwide but would be released a day earlier in the UK only. The band stated that they would remain a quintet and work with touring and session drummers. On June 11, Fearless Records released a video featuring the album's artwork and contained a teaser for the first single of the album, "Reincarnate", which was to be released on July 1, but was instead released on July 8. "Puppets 3 (The Grand Finale)" was released on iTunes on Tuesday August 5.

In an interview with Rock Sound magazine, Chris Motionless expressed that recording the third album was much easier compared to Infamous as "...the timeframe worked against me, and there was an inner conflict going on, trying to move into a different style of music and making a lot of mistakes as I went." He stated that the album's sound will contain the aggressiveness Creatures had which Infamous lacked in and will also have a more consistent style. Despite the departure of drummer Brandon Richter, the band stated that they remain as a quintet and will be working with touring and session drummers.

"For those asking about who is playing drums for us, we are just going to be touring with a drummer from now on and remaining a 5 piece band, and lastly, the drums for Reincarnate were performed and recorded by a close friend."

== Release and promotion ==
The album artwork was revealed in the teaser video released on June 11. It was created by Chad Michael Ward and features model Harper Leigh. After the album's announcement in July and pre-orders were made available, it was also reported that a deluxe edition of the album would also include a bible-styled case for the physical copy.

The album was listed as one of the most anticipated releases of 2014 by Alternative Press. The first single released off the album was the song of the same name and was released on July 8 after a week delay and was issued with a lyric video. After the album's official announcement, pre-orders were made available of which included many bundles including; bracelets, denim vests, necklaces and signed posters. After the song's release, the track list also became available, revealing thirteen tracks (fourteen including the bonus track) and included featured artists such as; Dani Filth of Cradle of Filth, Maria Brink of In This Moment and Tim Sköld formerly of Marilyn Manson and KMFDM.

The song "Puppets 3 (The Grand Finale)", featuring Dani Filth of the extreme metal band Cradle of Filth, was released on August 5 to promote the album and was also distributed with a lyric video. To promote their album, they streamed the non-deluxe album in full on September 11 after announcing a scavenger hunt to find eleven miniature wooden coffins which all contained a track from the album, nine stationed in American cities, one in Canada and the other in London, England. Once all had been found the album was put up online for streaming.

The music video for the first single "Reincarnate" was uploaded to YouTube by the band's record label on the same date as the album's international release, September 16, 2014. The music video was filmed in the same location that the album cover was shot at, later revealed as the Alexandria Hotel in Downtown Los Angeles and is a means of "...bringing the artwork to life...".

The song "Unstoppable", was used as the official theme song for WWE NXT TakeOver: Unstoppable. On February 19, 2015, the music video for the single "Break the Cycle" was released.

== Critical reception ==
Professional ratings
Aggregate scores
Source	Rating
Metacritic	74/100
Review scores
Source	Rating
AllMusic	3.5/5 stars
Alternative Press	4/5 stars
Metal Hammer	3.5/5 stars
Rock Sound	6/10

The album received positive reviews from music critics. Reincarnate received an average score of 74 out of 100 based on five reviews, which indicates "generally favorable reviews" on Metacritic. AllMusic gave the album a positive review and saying, "With the album running close to an hour, the guest spots help to add a little something different here and there, mixing things up before they have a chance to go stale. With so much going on, however, it's hard to see how any Motionless in White fans could be bored with the offerings laid before them on Reincarnate. With so much confidence and gothic swagger, it's hard not to be entertained by this album, and listeners who may have been thrown by their inconsistent early work would do well to dive back into the abyss with this third effort."

Jason Pettigrew of Alternative Press stated that this is the best direction that the band is going and is glad they have decided to progress their sound instead of listening to their fans and maintaining their old sound, saying of the album: "Sonically diverse and diamond-hard, Reincarnate takes seemingly disparate elements to create a soundtrack for metalheads, gothic beauties and industrial rivetheads to immerse themselves." Andy Biddulph of Rock Sound stated that the band appear to be firming up the sound from their previous album Infamous, but with various degrees of success. He complained that they are taking too much influence from Marilyn Manson and Cradle of Filth, therefore lacking in their own identity. However, Biddulph went on to say that it was a good effort and hopes that their next album will be an improvement.

== Commercial performance ==
The album sold 31,000 copies in its first week of release and debuted at No. 9 Billboard top 200, No. 1 Rock album charts, and became the No. 1 Metal Album on iTunes.

== Track listing ==
No.	Title	Writer(s)	Length
1.	"Death March"	Motionless in White, Mick Kenney, Drew Fulk, Tim Sköld	4:43
2.	"Reincarnate"	Motionless in White, Kenney, Fulk	3:40
3.	"Puppets 3 (The Grand Finale)" (featuring Dani Filth)	Motionless in White, Kenney	4:15
4.	"Unstoppable"	Motionless in White, Erik Ron	3:27
5.	"Everybody Sells Cocaine"	Motionless in White, Fulk, Sköld, Kyle Odell	3:55
6.	"Contemptress" (featuring Maria Brink)	Motionless in White, Sköld, Ron	4:02
7.	"Break the Cycle"	Motionless in White, Kenney, Fulk, Sköld, Odell	4:02
8.	"Generation Lost"	Motionless in White, Kenney, Fulk, Sköld	2:59
9.	"Dark Passenger"	Motionless in White, Kenney, Fulk, Ron	3:49
10.	"Wasp" (featuring Dessa Poljak of Silencio)	Motionless in White, Kenney, Fulk, Sköld	7:01
11.	"Dead as Fuck"	Motionless in White, Kenney, Fulk	2:57
12.	"Final Dictvm" (featuring Tim Sköld)	Sköld	5:06
13.	"Carry the Torch"	Motionless in White, Sköld	5:57
Total length:			55:53

Digital bonus tracks
No.	Title	Length
14.	"Sinematic" (acoustic version)	4:28
Total length:		60:21

10 Year Anniversary
No.	Title	Length
1.	"Reincarnate: Reincarnated"	3:36
2.	"Contemptress: Reincarnated (Feat. Maria Brink)"	4:03
3.	"Unstoppable (NXT Version)"	3:26
Total length:		67:06

== Personnel ==
Motionless in White

- Chris Motionless – lead vocals
- Josh Balz – keyboards, backing vocals
- Ryan Sitkowski – lead guitar
- Ricky Horror – rhythm guitar, backing vocals, vocals on "Final Dictvm"
- Devin "Ghost" Sola – bass, backing vocals, vocals on "Final Dictvm"

Additional musicians

- Tom Hane – drums
- Dani Filth – guest vocals on "Puppets 3 (The Grand Finale)"
- Maria Brink – guest vocals on "Contemptress"
- Dessa Poljak of Silencio – additional vocals on "Wasp"
- Tim Sköld – additional vocals on "Death March" and "Final Dictvm", acoustic guitar on "Sinematic (Acoustic Version)", co-production on "Death March", "Wasp" and "Final Dictvm", additional lyrics
- Drew Fulk – additional vocals on "Everybody Sells Cocaine" and "Generation Lost", additional lyrics
- Kate Steinberg – additional vocals on "Dead as Fuck"

Additional personnel

- Dan Korneff – production, mixing
- Chris Motionless – production, lyrics
- Ted Jensen – mastering
- Alex Prieto – engineering
- Matthew Kirby – assisting engineering
- Jim Romano – digital editing
- Erik Ron – additional production and programming on "Contemptress"
- Ricky Horror – additional lyrics
- Chris Foitle and Sal Torres – A&R
- Kim Schon – business management
- Jenny Reader – product management
- Matt Andersen – U.S. booking for The Agency Group
- Tom Taaffe – international booking for The Agency Group
- Chad Michael Ward – album photography
- Mike Farrell – layout, design
- Harper Leigh – cover model

== Charts ==
Chart (2014)	Peak position
Australian Albums (ARIA)	19
Canadian Albums (Billboard)	20
UK Albums (Official Charts)	43
UK Rock & Metal Albums (Official Charts)	3
US Billboard 200	9
US Independent Albums (Billboard)	2
US Top Album Sales (Billboard)	9
US Top Hard Rock Albums (Billboard)	1
US Top Rock Albums (Billboard)	1

=== Year-end charts ===
Chart (2014)	Position
US Top Hard Rock Albums	29
