= When Love Met Destruction =

EP by Motionless in White
- Released: February 17, 2009
- Genres: Metalcore; post-hardcore
- Length: 23:30
- Labels: Tragic Hero, Fearless
- Producers: Zach Neil, Motionless In White

Motionless in White chronology
The Whorror (2007)	When Love Met Destruction (2009)	Creatures (2010)

Singles from When Love Met Destruction
- 1. "Ghost in the Mirror" Released: 2009

When Love Met Destruction is the second EP by American metalcore band Motionless in White. It was released on February 17, 2009, through Tragic Hero Records.

== Background ==
When Love Met Destruction was recorded in the group's hometown after a year of releasing their debut EP The Whorror. Although When Love Met Destruction is an EP as its releasing through Tragic Hero, it was originally intended to be a full-length album, where it was recorded in 2008 with limited production values, but the album ultimately went unfinished. After signing with Tragic Hero Records, Motionless in White then made the decision to re-record six of the album's eleven tracks, which then came out as an EP.

The song "Ghost in the Mirror" was released along with a music video, a "uncensored" version of the video surfaced on the internet, the video contains a man in hospital with a nurse covered in blood with clips found in the "censored" version in between; whether the band had any involvement with the uncensored music video is unknown.

Some songs from the original album version of When Love Met Destruction were later remade into new songs. Such as how "Bananamontana" was remade into the song "City Lights" and the chorus of "When Love Met Destruction" was remade and featured as the chorus of their song "Creatures". Both "City Lights" and "Creatures", along with a re-recording of "We Only Come Out at Night", were featured on the band's 2010 full-length album, Creatures.

== Track listing ==
All songs written by Chris "Motionless" Cerulli.

Original CD
No.	Title	Length
1.	"To Keep from Getting Burned"	3:30
2.	"Ghost in the Mirror"	3:37
3.	"Whatever You Do... Don't Push the Red Button"	3:35
4.	"Destroying Everything"	5:02
5.	"Billy in 4-C Never Saw It Coming"	4:03
6.	"The Seventh Circle"	3:32
Total length:		23:30

Limited edition
No.	Title	Length
1.	"When Love Met Destruction"	2:15
2.	"To Keep from Getting Burned"	3:30
3.	"Ghost in the Mirror"	3:37
4.	"Destroying Everything"	5:02
5.	"Whatever You Do... Don't Push the Red Button"	3:35
6.	"She Never Made It to the Emergency Room"	3:32
7.	"Billy in 4-C Never Saw It Coming"	4:03
8.	"We Only Come Out at Night"	2:49
9.	"Bananamontana"	3:05
10.	"The Seventh Circle"	3:35
11.	"Apocolips"	3:58
Total length:		38:53

== Personnel ==
Motionless in White

- Chris "Motionless" Cerulli – lead vocals, additional guitar
- Ryan Sitkowski – lead guitar
- Thomas "TJ" Bell – rhythm guitar, co-lead vocals
- Frank Polumbo – bass
- Josh Balz – keyboards, backing vocals
- Angelo Parente – drums

Additional musicians

- Mike Costanza – lead guitar (limited edition)
- Andy Peck - vocals on "Destroying Everything"
- Jeremy Romani - vocals on "Destroying Everything"

Additional personnel

- Brian J. Anthony and Dave Yukon – audio engineering
- Jamie King - mixing and mastering
- Tony Lee Bonomo – photography
