= Disguise (album) =

Studio album by Motionless in White
- Released: June 7, 2019
- Recorded: May 2018–March 2019
- Genres: Metalcore; gothic metal; industrial metal; nu metal
- Length: 42:31
- Label: Roadrunner
- Producers: Drew Fulk; Chris "Motionless" Cerulli

Motionless in White chronology
Graveyard Shift (2017)	Disguise (2019)	Scoring the End of the World (2022)

Singles from Disguise
- 1. "Disguise" Released: April 17, 2019; 2. "Brand New Numb" Released: April 17, 2019; 3. "Undead Ahead 2: The Tale of the Midnight Ride" Released: May 10, 2019; 4. "Another Life" Released: January 21, 2020; 5. "Thoughts & Prayers" Released: July 1, 2021

Disguise is the fifth studio album by American metalcore band Motionless in White. It was released on June 7, 2019, through Roadrunner Records and was produced by Drew Fulk and Chris "Motionless" Cerulli. It is the second release on a major label since the band's departure from Fearless Records. The album's tracklist was revealed on April 17 together with the release of the two singles, "Disguise", which had been premiered at Earthday Birthday in Orlando a few days prior, and "Brand New Numb". It is the band's first album to credit Vinny Mauro on drums, as well as the first album not to feature Josh Balz on keyboards.

== Background and promotion ==
On May 6, 2018, Chris Motionless announced via Instagram that a new album would be released in 2019. He claimed that he, along with Ryan Sitkowski and Ricky Olson, would begin full-time writing prior to touring with Warped Tour that summer.

On April 17, the band announced the album was to be titled Disguise. On the same day, they released two singles off of the album titled "Disguise" and "Brand New Numb", along with the tracklist and official artwork created by Zach Dunn.

On May 10, the band released their third single "Undead Ahead 2: The Tale of the Midnight Ride" and its corresponding music video.

On June 5, two days before the album was due to drop, the band premiered the song "Thoughts & Prayers" on BBC's Radio 1's Rock Show with Daniel P. Carter.

The song "Brand New Numb" was featured in NHL 20.

== Documentary ==
On June 12, Motionless in White released a documentary on the recording and making of the album. The documentary consists of what it was like to make the album along with what the album means to the band. There are also clips of studio jokes, guitar work, and some vocals from the album. The documentary has interviews of the band and what they think of the album throughout, with Chris Motionless saying, "And with this record, I heavily gravitated towards writing about the long journey of admitting to myself that I'm struggling with a lot mentally and, while simultaneously being in the best and happiest place in my life, I was also in one of the darkest places, and that contradiction of those feelings festered in my head and left me more and more confused by my life in general to which it then manifested into deeper and deeper destructive feelings and actions as my time ignoring it went on until one day I just lost it and broke down, and there begins basically the story of so many of these songs." While the album has a lot of emotions in it, there are also different feelings for the album with Ryan Sitkowski saying that this is a "solidified version of what Motionless in White actually is". The recordings shown are the songs that can be heard across the album with the song, "Another Life" being a background track during parts of the video. Justin Morrow is shown in the documentary having just joined the band and helping make the record, showing him doing background screams.

== Critical reception ==
Professional ratings
Review scores
Source	Rating
Already Heard	3.5/5 stars
Dead Press!	4/10
Distorted Sound	7/10
Sputnikmusic	1.5/5 stars
Wall of Sound	3.5/5 stars

Disguise received mixed reviews from several music critics. Ian Kenworthy of Already Heard gave the album 3.5 out of 5 and said: "At its best, Disguise delivers a fun bucketload of goth-flavored metalcore mayhem. However, it sags in places, especially when they step outside their comfort zone." Carlos Zelaya of Dead Press! scored the album 4/10 stating: "For their fifth album, Disguise, you pretty much know what to expect at this point, with the album being rife with the band's signature goth and industrial-tinged metal, with some clear toe-dipping into nu-metal here and there too."

Distorted Sound scored the album 7 out of 10 and said: "In all, MOTIONLESS IN WHITE have sculpted an album that will surely continue to contribute to their domination, but it does feel as though it achieves this at the expense of innovation and more forward thinking ideology. They are a band that have achieved a lot despite their hardship, and their well earned confidence shines through Disguise at every opportunity." Adam Rice of Wall of Sound rated the album 3.5 out of 5 saying, "Motionless In White have done it again, although not all songs are great there is a healthy mix of different styles and genres which would tailor to anyone's music tastes. With not one song sounding similar to another, its a bag of all sorts!"

Loudwire named it one of the 50 best metal albums of 2019 and the best nu metal album of 2019.

== Track listing ==
All tracks are written by Chris Cerulli and Drew Fulk, with co-writers listed.

No.	Title	Co-writer(s)	Length
1.	"Disguise"	Mick Kenney	3:58
2.	"Headache"	Tom Hane	3:29
3.	"</c0de>"	Ricky Olson; John Sustar II	3:49
4.	"Thoughts & Prayers"	Hane; Johnny Andrews	4:01
5.	"Legacy"	Erik Ron	3:33
6.	"Undead Ahead 2: The Tale of the Midnight Ride"	Justin Morrow; Justin Deblieck	4:34
7.	"Holding on to Smoke"	Olson; Hane; Andrews; Ryan Sitkowski	4:14
8.	"Another Life"	Josh Strock	3:25
9.	"Broadcasting from Beyond the Grave: Death Inc."	Sustar II	3:54
10.	"Brand New Numb"	Hane; Andrews	3:42
11.	"Catharsis"	Hane	3:52
Total length:			42:31

2021 special edition bonus track
No.	Title	Writer(s)	Length
12.	"Somebody Told Me" (The Killers cover)	Brandon Flowers; Mark Stoermer; Dave Keuning; Ronnie Vannucci Jr.	3:19
Total length:			45:50

== Personnel ==
Credits retrieved from AllMusic.

Motionless in White

- Chris "Motionless" Cerulli – lead vocals, additional guitars, production
- Ryan Sitkowski – lead guitar, bass, backing vocals (4)
- Ricky "Horror" Olson – rhythm guitar, bass, backing vocals, co-lead vocals (6)
- Vinny Mauro – drums (credited, but does not perform)
- Justin Morrow – bass, backing vocals (credited, but does not perform)

Additional musicians

- Tom Hane – drums, engineering

Additional personnel

- Drew Fulk – production, mixing
- Jeff Dunne – engineering
- Justin DeBlieck – vocal engineering, editing
- Dave Rath – A&R
- Kim Schon – management
- Zach Dunn – cover art
- Sean Smith – design, layout
- Lindsay Adler – photography

== Charts ==
Chart (2019)	Peak position
Australian Albums (ARIA)	32
Austrian Albums (Ö3 Austria)	69
Swiss Albums (Schweizer Hitparade)	65
UK Albums (Official Charts)	98
UK Rock & Metal Albums (Official Charts)	5
US Billboard 200	27
US Top Album Sales (Billboard)	4
US Top Hard Rock Albums (Billboard)	2
US Top Rock Albums (Billboard)	4
