= Creatures (Motionless in White album) =

Studio album by Motionless in White
- Released: October 12, 2010
- Recorded: May 2010
- Studios: Wade Studios, Ocala, Florida
- Genres: Metalcore; screamo; post-hardcore; shock rock
- Length: 45:56
- Label: Fearless
- Producer: Andrew Wade

Motionless in White chronology
When Love Met Destruction (2009)	Creatures (2010)	Infamous (2012)

Singles from Creatures
- 1. "Abigail" Released: August 30, 2010; 2. "Creatures" Released: July 7, 2011; 3. "Immaculate Misconception" Released: November 11, 2011; 4. "Puppets (The First Snow)" Released: February 15, 2012

Creatures is the debut studio album by American metalcore band Motionless in White. It was released on October 12, 2010 through Fearless Records and was produced by Andrew Wade. The album produced four singles: "Abigail", "Immaculate Misconception", the title track "Creatures" and "Puppets (The First Snow)", all four of which have accompanying music videos. The album also produced three promotional singles: "Abigail", which was later released as the first official single of the album, "London in Terror", and "Cobwebs". The title "creatures" is also commonly used to refer to the fans of the band. Creatures is the only album to feature rhythm guitarist Thomas "TJ" Bell, who was fired from the band in May 2011 and subsequently joined Escape the Fate full-time.

On October 9, 2020, Motionless in White released a 10th anniversary re-issue of the album titled Creatures X.

== Background and recording ==
Creatures is an album dedicated to Motionless in White's fans. The band even went as far as letting their fans send in lyrics, which were compiled on the title track; all the lines found in the song (excluding the chorus) are lyrics submitted by fans. The songs "We Only Come Out at Night" and "City Lights" are re-recorded and altered versions of songs from the album version of When Love Met Destruction. Sections of the song "When Love Met Destruction" were re-used on two new songs. The chorus of the song "Creatures" and the opening guitar riff of "Puppets (The First Snow)". Creatures was recorded during May 2010 with producer Andrew Wade at his recording studio, Wade Studios.

== Release and promotion ==
A total of four songs from the album have had music videos. On December 21, 2010, a music video was released for the track "Abigail". The music video for the track "Creatures" was released on July 7, 2011, and the video for "Immaculate Misconception" surfaced on November 11, 2011, which also features Dee Snider, who makes a cameo appearance while his son, Cody, directed the video.

It was announced on the 2011 All Stars Tour that the song "Puppets (The First Snow)" would also be released as a single, but the music video would not be released until February 15, 2012. The video consists of the band performing at several concerts and festivals. The outdoor clips shown in the video were recorded at a live performance during the All Stars Tour's stop in Las Vegas on August 21, 2011.

A re-release for the album was confirmed during January 2012. It was announced to feature their cover of the song "Dragula" by Rob Zombie along with two remixed songs, and was released on April 2, 2012.

== Critical reception ==
Professional ratings
Review scores
Source	Rating
AllMusic	3/5 stars
The Marshalltown Chronicle	4/5 stars
Rock Sound	7/10

The album received positive reviews from music critics. AllMusic gave the album a positive review but saying, "In a genre with a laundry list of cookie-cutter bands all fighting to grab the attention of a young audience, sometimes distinguishing yourself is a matter of degrees. On their debut full-length, Motionless in White attempt to do just that. Delivering a heavy-hitting dose of horror themed metalcore, Creatures finds the band exploring a more gothic sound. With lots of breakdowns, reverse drum swells, good cop/bad cop vocals, and bass bombs, there's a lot about the album that feels pretty much by the book. Where Motionless in White are able to make it interesting is in the use of their electronic elements. Rather than going for the usual dance-pop sound, the band uses their synthesizers to create a dark and uneasy atmosphere. This blend of the frightening and the familiar gives Creatures not only the ability to draw fans in with something they'll immediately click with, but which will keep them coming back for another helping."

Rock Sound gave it 7 out of 10 and said: "While Pennsylvania's Motionless In White push past the boundaries of screamo into more metallic territories, their intermittently screamed and harmonised vocals, epic choruses and brutal breakdowns keep them firmly in touch with their roots. Thematically, there's a venom spat out in opener 'Immaculate Misconception' that's maintained – lyrical allusions in frontman Chris Motionless' interpretations of history and literature or parallels with his musical heroes (listen out for The Smiths reference in 'Puppets (The First Snow)') keep things good and dark throughout. At times, the dramatic crosses over into the theatrical, but even then it's good to see an of-the-moment band taking things seriously."

== Commercial performance ==
Upon the record's release, it debuted at number six on the Billboard Heatseekers Albums chart, and reached number 175 on the Billboard 200.

== Track listing ==
All music composed by Motionless in White, all lyrics written by Chris Motionless except for "Creatures" written by Chris Motionless and fans of the band.

No.	Title	Writer(s)	Length
1.	"Immaculate Misconception"	Chris Cerulli, Josh Balz, Angelo Parente	3:54
2.	"We Only Come Out at Night" (re-recorded version; original version from When Love Met Destruction)	Cerulli, Parente	3:23
3.	"London in Terror"	Cerulli, Parente, Ricky Olson	3:41
4.	"Abigail" (featuring Nicholas Brooks of It Dies Today)	Cerulli, Parente, Olson, Balz	2:52
5.	"Creatures"	Cerulli, Parente, Balz	3:47
6.	"Cobwebs" (featuring Andre Bravo of In Alcatraz 1962)	Cerulli	3:29
7.	".Com Pt. II" (part 2 of the song "Schitzophrenicannibalisticsexfest.com" from The Whorror)	Cerulli	3:49
8.	"Count Choculitis"	Cerulli	4:03
9.	"City Lights" (re-recorded version of the song "Bananamontana" from When Love Met Destruction)	Cerulli	3:08
10.	"Puppets (The First Snow)"	Cerulli, Olson, Jason Suecof	4:20
11.	"Undead Ahead"	Cerulli	3:57
12.	"Scissorhands (The Last Snow)"	Cerulli	5:33
Total length:			45:56

Deluxe edition bonus tracks
No.	Title	Length
13.	"Dragula" (Rob Zombie cover)	4:03
14.	"Creatures" (Celldweller "Beauty" Remix)	4:41
15.	"Mallevs Maleficarvm" (Tim Sköld Remix)	4:59
Total length:		59:39

== Personnel ==
Motionless in White

- Chris "Motionless" Cerulli – lead vocals
- Ryan Sitkowski – lead guitar
- Thomas "TJ" Bell – rhythm guitar, co-lead vocals
- Ricky "Horror" Olson – bass, backing vocals
- Josh Balz – keyboards, backing vocals
- Angelo Parente – drums

Additional musicians

- Nicholas Brooks of It Dies Today – additional vocals on "Abigail"
- Andre Bravo of In Alcatraz 1962 – additional vocals on "Cobwebs"

Additional personnel

- Andrew Wade – production, mixing, engineering
- Alan Douches – mastering
- Glenn Sawyer – production, keyboard engineering
- Joe La Barbera – vocal engineering, vocal production
- Jason Valenti – vocal engineering, vocal production
- Val Valentin – vocal engineering, vocal production
- Shervon Esfahani – A&R
- Devin Timmons – management
- Matt Pike – booking
- Sol Amstutz – illustrations, design

== Charts ==
Chart (2010)	Peak position
US Billboard 200	175
US Heatseekers Albums (Billboard)	6
US Independent Albums (Billboard)	31
US Top Hard Rock Albums (Billboard)	18
