= Scoring the End of the World =

Studio album by Motionless in White
- Released: June 10, 2022
- Recorded: May 2020 – February 2022
- Genres: Industrial metal; metalcore; gothic metal
- Length: 49:51
- Label: Roadrunner
- Producers: Drew Fulk; Justin DeBlieck

Motionless in White chronology
Disguise (2019)	Scoring the End of the World (2022)	Decades (2026)

Singles from Scoring the End of the World
- 1. "Cyberhex" Released: March 11, 2022; 2. "Masterpiece" Released: April 14, 2022; 3. "Slaughterhouse" Released: May 13, 2022; 4. "Scoring the End of the World" Released: June 3, 2022; 5. "Werewolf" Released: October 31, 2022; 6. "Sign of Life" Released: September 8, 2023

Scoring the End of the World is the sixth studio album by American metalcore band Motionless in White. It was released on June 10, 2022, through Roadrunner Records. The album was produced by Drew Fulk and Justin DeBlieck. It is the band's first album to feature drummer Vinny Mauro and bassist Justin Morrow performing on the release.

== Background and promotion ==
In May 2020, during a livestream interview, Chris Motionless announced that they were already working on their next album, and assured that the songs for the album will be heavier, although the recording could be delayed due to the COVID-19 pandemic.

On March 7, 2022, the band announced that they were planning to release new music on Friday, March 11, with a 30-second video teaser hinting at some potentially new music. On that day, the band officially released the new single "Cyberhex" featuring Lindsay Schoolcraft along with its music video. At the same time, they officially announced the album itself while also revealing the album cover and the track list.

On April 14, the band unveiled the second single "Masterpiece" and its corresponding music video. On May 13, the band released the third single "Slaughterhouse" featuring Bryan Garris of Knocked Loose. On June 3, one week before the album release, the band released the title track "Scoring the End of the World" featuring Mick Gordon. On July 7, 2023, the band announced the deluxe edition of the album which was released on September 8, 2023. At the same time, the band officially revealed the track list.

== Composition ==
=== Influences, style and themes ===
Scoring the End of the World has been described as industrial metal, metalcore, and gothic metal, leaning heavily into deathcore at times, as well as hard rock. The final breakdown of "Slaughterhouse" is heavily influenced by beatdown hardcore; Garris' band, Knocked Loose, has been attributed this label previously. Knocked Loose would later record their own sequel to the song for their 2024 album You Won't Go Before You're Supposed To, entitled "Slaughterhouse 2" and featuring Motionless.

The album additionally contains nu metal influences on certain tracks, such as "Sign of Life", "Cyberhex", and "Scoring the End of the World" all featuring rapping vocals. "Red, White & Boom" is a hard rock and industrial metalcore song. "Werewolf" is a pop rock song featuring synth-pop and electropop influences, and alongside "B.F.B.T.G.: Corpse Nation", which has been described as progressive metalcore, has drawn comparisons to the horror theatrics of Ice Nine Kills. "Masterpiece" and "Porcelain" are noted for their similarities to, and taking influence, from Breaking Benjamin, with "Masterpiece" being described as a power ballad and also drawing comparisons to My Chemical Romance.

Scoring the End of the World is a politically charged album, with its lyrics touching upon themes such as global warming, corrupt leadership, inequality, and violence. "Sign of Life", "Cause of Death", "Porcelain", and "Werewolf" collectively have a mental health theme, specifically dealing with internal conflict. "Cyberhex" has been stated by lead vocalist Chris Motionless to be a "love letter" to fans of the band.

== Critical reception ==
Professional ratings
Review scores
Source	Rating
Blabbermouth.net	7/10
Distorted Sound	9/10
Kerrang!	3/5 stars
Rock 'N' Load	10/10
Rock Sins	9/10
Wall of Sound	7.5/10

The album received generally positive reviews from critics. Taylor Markarian from Blabbermouth.net gave the album 7 out of 10 and said: "The big takeaway is that despite how incredible this band can be, they still have not managed to completely weave all of their musical influences together in a way that is unquestionably cohesive." Distorted Sound scored the album 9 out of 10 and said: "With Scoring the End of the World however, MOTIONLESS IN WHITE have earned that accolade. They've stumbled across their golden key and opened the door to a new age for themselves. Disguise may have been the launch pad, but this record shoots MOTIONLESS IN WHITE into their own stratosphere." Kerrang! gave the album 3 out of 5 and stated: "The difference lies not in delivery but in writing, something that MIW have now proved they can get stunningly right – they just need to spend a little longer with that muse."

Rock 'N' Load praised the album saying, "Motionless In White have crafted truly the best release of their career so far with Scoring the End of the World. The album sounds and feels completely fresh while being so familiar at the same time. The songwriting, the musicianship, the range of features, and just everything about this release are at the top of the game. An incredible album that shows a band at truly top form." Simon Crampton of Rock Sins rated the album 9 out of 10 and said: "With each new album, they take a step further to greatness. On Scoring the End of the World, they have created their most complete record. Cleverly, the band takes all the best parts of what makes the band they are and has built an album and sound that will not only reward their long term fans, but will also bring them legions of new ones. This is Motionless In White's defining moment that will take then from infamous underdogs to undeniable superstars." Wall of Sound gave the album a score 7.5/10 and saying: "While it's not a perfect album, it's a continuation of the band's signature sound and an example of what they can produce under extreme amounts of pressure… such as a global pandemic!"

== Track listing ==
All tracks are written by Chris "Motionless" Cerulli with additional co-writers where noted.

Scoring the End of the World track listing
No.	Title	Writer(s)	Length
1.	"Meltdown"	Drew Fulk; John Sustar; Johnny Andrews; Justin Morrow	4:28
2.	"Sign of Life"	Fulk; Bobby Lynge	3:40
3.	"Werewolf"	Fulk; Justin Deblieck; Micah Premnath; Rockwell; Steve Sopchak; Tom Hane	3:32
4.	"Porcelain"	Sopchak	3:36
5.	"Slaughterhouse" (featuring Bryan Garris of Knocked Loose)	Fulk; Deblieck; Sopchak; Hane	4:23
6.	"Masterpiece"	Fulk; Erik Ron; Deblieck; Sopchak	3:26
7.	"Cause of Death"	Fulk; Deblieck; Morrow; Mick Kenney; Ricky Olson; Sopchak	4:03
8.	"We Become the Night"	Fulk; Hane	3:31
9.	"Burned at Both Ends II"	Jon McLean; Jordan Curran	3:57
10.	"B.F.B.T.G.: Corpse Nation"	Deblieck; Morrow; Sopchak	3:34
11.	"Cyberhex" (featuring Lindsay Schoolcraft)	Fulk; Deblieck; Morrow; Sopchak	4:35
12.	"Red, White & Boom" (featuring Caleb Shomo of Beartooth)	Fulk; Olson; Hane	3:18
13.	"Scoring the End of the World" (featuring Mick Gordon)	Fulk; Andrews; Morrow; Kenney; Olson; Sopchak	3:48
Total length:			49:51

Deluxe edition bonus tracks
No.	Title	Writer(s)	Length
14.	"Hollow Points"	Deblieck; Hane	3:07
15.	"Fool's Gold"	Deblieck; Morrow; Logan Beaver; Ryan Sitkowski	3:53
16.	"Timebomb" (STEOTW mix)	McLean; Curran; Deblieck	3:44
17.	"Porcelain: Ricky Motion Picture Collection"	Sopchak	4:07
Total length:			64:42

== Personnel ==
Credits retrieved from AllMusic.

Motionless in White

- Chris "Motionless" Cerulli – lead vocals
- Ryan Sitkowski – lead guitar
- Ricky "Horror" Olson – rhythm guitar, co-lead vocals (7, 13, 16), lead vocals (17)
- Justin Morrow – bass, backing vocals, co-lead vocals (8, 10)
- Vinny Mauro – drums

Additional musicians

- Bryan Garris – guest vocals (5)
- Lindsay Schoolcraft – guest vocals (11)
- Caleb Shomo – guest vocals (12)
- Mick Gordon – guest instrumentation, vocals (13)
- Tom Hane – additional instrumentation (8, 12), additional vocals (8)
- Alyce Madden – additional vocals (tracks 1, 11)
- Steve Sopchak – additional vocals (3)
- Jonathan McLean – additional vocals (9)
- Ellie Mitchell – additional vocals (11, 13)

Additional personnel

- Drew Fulk – production, additional vocals (2)
- Justin DeBlieck – production, additional vocals, guitar solo (8)
- Zakk Cervini – mixing
- Ted Jensen – mastering

== Charts ==
=== Weekly charts ===
Weekly chart performance for Scoring the End of the World
Chart (2022)	Peak position
Australian Albums (ARIA)	14
Austrian Albums (Ö3 Austria)	36
Canadian Albums (Billboard)	44
German Albums (Offizielle Top 100)	30
Swiss Albums (Schweizer Hitparade)	87
UK Albums (Official Charts)	92
UK Rock & Metal Albums (Official Charts)	3
US Billboard 200	12
US Top Hard Rock Albums (Billboard)	1
US Top Rock Albums (Billboard)	2

Chart (2025)	Peak position
French Rock & Metal Albums (SNEP) Deluxe edition	93

=== Year-end charts ===
Year-end chart performance for Scoring the End of the World
Chart (2022)	Position
US Hard Rock Albums (Billboard)	43
