= Graveyard Shift (album) =

Studio album by Motionless in White
- Released: May 5, 2017
- Recorded: 2016
- Genres: Metalcore; nu metal; industrial metal; alternative metal
- Length: 48:06
- Label: Roadrunner
- Producers: Drew Fulk; Chris "Motionless" Cerulli

Motionless in White chronology
| Reincarnate (2014) | Graveyard Shift (2017) | Disguise (2019) |

Singles from Graveyard Shift
- 1. "570" Released: June 24, 2016; 2. "Eternally Yours" Released: January 27, 2017; 3. "Loud (Fuck It)" Released: March 3, 2017; 4. "Rats" Released: April 30, 2017; 5. "Necessary Evil" Released: September 27, 2017; 6. "Voices" Released: May 23, 2018

Graveyard Shift is the fourth studio album by American metalcore band Motionless in White. It was released on May 5, 2017, through Roadrunner Records and was produced by Drew Fulk and Chris "Motionless" Cerulli. It is the first release on a major label since the band's departure from Fearless Records. The album's track list was revealed on March 3 together with the release of the single, "Loud (Fuck It)", which debuted on Octane with an accompanying music video. It is the band's last album with keyboardist Josh Balz and bassist Devin "Ghost" Sola.

The album also features a collaboration with Korn frontman Jonathan Davis on the song "Necessary Evil". On September 27, 2017, the music video for "Necessary Evil" starring Vered Blonstein, Ian Adema and Cervena Fox was released. Alternative Press named the video one of the best music videos of 2017. The album debuted at no. 27 on the Billboard 200 chart.

== Background and promotion ==
Vocalist Chris Motionless has stated that their new album will not be released through Fearless Records. On June 24, 2016, the band released the lead single titled "570", from the band's forthcoming studio album, which will be released via Roadrunner Records. On October 31, Roadrunner announced the album was to be titled Graveyard Shift. The band reached out to the fans with a contest to design the new album's artwork.

On January 27, 2017, the band released the second single from Graveyard Shift, titled "Eternally Yours". A day later, it was revealed that Graveyard Shift is set to be released on May 5, 2017. The band opened up an artwork competition to their fans allowing them to create the artwork for the upcoming album.

On March 3, the band revealed the album's official artwork created by Crystal Johnson and tracklist, followed by the release of their third single, "Loud (Fuck It)" and the accompanying music video. On April 30, the band released their fourth single "Rats", few days before the initial album release.

== Critical reception ==
Professional ratings
Aggregate scores
| Source | Rating |
|---|---|
| Metacritic | 82/100 |
Review scores
| Source | Rating |
| AllMusic | 3.5/5 stars |
| Metal Hammer | 3/5 stars |
| Metal Injection | 7/10 |
| Rock Sound | 7/10 |

The album received acclaim from music critics, having received an average score of 82 out of 100 on Metacritic based on 4 reviews. AllMusic gave the album a positive review and saying, "Graveyard Shift is a highly enjoyable and entertaining continuation for a band that knowingly winks along with the madness they concoct."

Metal Hammer gave the album a positive review and stated: "It's these little touches that add interest to a record that largely continues, rather than reinvents, what Motionless In White are about, but there are enough singalong choruses and stomping riffs to satisfy diehard fans." Rock Sound gave it 7 out of 10 and said: "With that said, there are plenty of moments on this record where it feels like Motionless have grown into their own skin; tugging at the heartstrings one moment and cutting straight to the bone the next. Sure, the shock and shlock are still prominent (would we want it any other way?) but songs like 'Eternally Yours' will stay with you well after the curtains have fallen and the theatre's emptied. There still might be a masterpiece in them yet."

== Track listing ==
Graveyard Shift track listing
| No. | Title | Writer(s) | Length |
|---|---|---|---|
| 1. | "Rats" | Chris Cerulli, Drew Fulk, Tom Hane, Ricky Olson | 3:55 |
| 2. | "Queen for Queen" | Josh Strock, Stevie Aiello, Cerulli, Fulk, Hane | 3:22 |
| 3. | "Necessary Evil" (featuring Jonathan Davis) | John Gluck, Wally Gold, Seymour Gottlieb, Mick Kenney, Molly Salley-Ryan, Fulk, Cerulli, Olson | 3:48 |
| 4. | "Soft" | Johnny Andrews, Cerulli, Fulk, Hane, Olson | 3:30 |
| 5. | "Untouchable" | Cerulli, Aiello, Fulk, Kenney | 3:58 |
| 6. | "Not My Type: Dead as Fuck 2" | Cerulli, Fulk, Hane, Kenney, Olson | 4:22 |
| 7. | "The Ladder" | Cerulli, Olson, Fulk, Kenney | 4:17 |
| 8. | "Voices" | Joshua Landry, Andrews, Fulk, Cerulli, Strock | 3:44 |
| 9. | "Loud (Fuck It)" | Cerulli, Fulk | 3:42 |
| 10. | "570" | Cerulli, Olson, Fulk | 4:31 |
| 11. | "Hourglass" | Cerulli, Olson | 3:45 |
| 12. | "Eternally Yours" | Cerulli, Kenney, Fulk, Olson | 5:12 |
| Total length: | | | 48:06 |

Japanese CD edition
| No. | Title | Length |
|---|---|---|
| 13. | "Eternally Yours" (Ricky Horror acoustic version) | 4:26 |
| Total length: | | 52:32 |

== Personnel ==
Motionless in White

- Chris Motionless – lead vocals
- Ryan Sitkowski – lead guitar
- Ricky Horror – rhythm guitar, backing vocals, co-lead vocals on track "Eternally Yours (Acoustic Version)"
- Devin "Ghost" Sola – bass, backing vocals
- Josh Balz – keyboards, backing vocals

Additional musicians

- Tom Hane – drums, programming, composition
- Jonathan Davis of Korn – guest vocals on "Necessary Evil"
- Stevie Aiello – backing vocals on "Untouchable", composition
- Marie-Christine Allard – backing vocals on "Not My Type: Dead as Fuck 2"
- Gaiapatra – backing vocals on "Rats", "Not My Type: Dead as Fuck 2" and "Loud (Fuck It)", composition
- Kylie Zook – additional vocals on "The Ladder"

Additional personnel

- Drew Fulk – engineering, production, composition, backing vocals on "Rats", "Not My Type: Dead as Fuck 2" and "Loud (Fuck It)"
- Chris Motionless – production
- Josh Strock – engineering, composition
- Johnny Andrews, John Gluck, Wally Gold, Seymour Gottlieb, Herbert Wiener and Joshua Landry – composition
- Jeff Dunne – editing, engineering
- Josh Wilbur – mastering, mixing
- Paul Suarez – mixing engineering
- Mick Kenney – programming, composition
- Kile Odell – programming
- John Loustou and Samon Rajabnik – drum engineering
- Jonathan Weiner – band photo
- Crystal Johnson – cover design, photography
- Sean Mosher-Smith – design, layout

== Charts ==
Chart performance for Graveyard Shift
| Chart (2017) | Peak position |
|---|---|
| Australian Albums (ARIA) | 35 |
| Belgian Albums (Ultratop Flanders) | 126 |
| Canadian Albums (Billboard) | 83 |
| German Albums (Offizielle Top 100) | 88 |
| New Zealand Heatseekers Albums (RMNZ) | 6 |
| Scottish Albums (Official Charts) | 47 |
| Swiss Albums (Schweizer Hitparade) | 99 |
| UK Albums (Official Charts) | 72 |
| UK Rock & Metal Albums (Official Charts) | 3 |
| US Billboard 200 | 27 |
| US Top Album Sales (Billboard) | 13 |
| US Top Hard Rock Albums (Billboard) | 1 |
| US Top Rock Albums (Billboard) | 5 |
