= Motionless in White =

American metalcore band

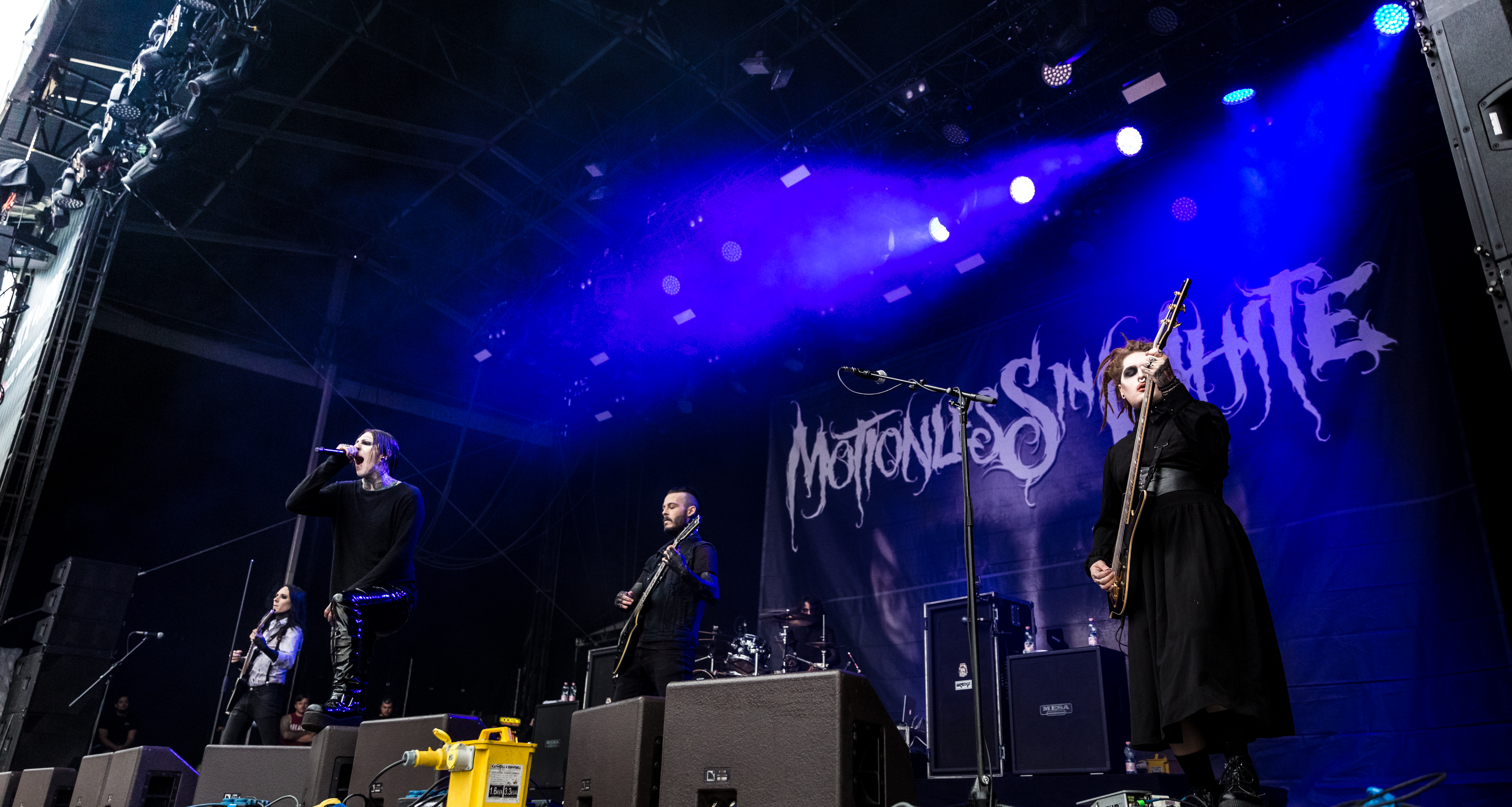
- Motionless in White at Rock am Ring 2017

Background information
- Also known as: MIW
- Origin: Scranton, Pennsylvania, U.S.
- Genres: Metalcore; gothic metal; industrial metal; nu metal; hard rock
- Works: Motionless in White discography
- Years active: 2004–present
- Labels: Roadrunner; Fearless; Tragic Hero; Masquerade
- Members: Chris "Motionless" Cerulli; Ryan Sitkowski; Ricky "Horror" Olson; Vinny Mauro; Justin Morrow
- Past members: Kyle White; Mike Costanza; Frank Polumbo; Thomas "TJ" Bell; Angelo Parente; Brandon "Rage" Richter; Josh Balz; Devin "Ghost" Sola
- Website: motionlessinwhite.net

Motionless in White is an American metalcore band from Scranton, Pennsylvania. Formed in 2004, the band consists of lead vocalist Chris "Motionless" Cerulli, guitarists Ryan Sitkowski and Ricky "Horror" Olson, drummer Vinny Mauro and bassist Justin Morrow. Cerulli is the only member of the original line-up that remains in the band. The group has stated that their band name derived from the Eighteen Visions song "Motionless and White".

Motionless in White was signed to Fearless Records for their first three studio albums; their fourth album, Graveyard Shift, was released in May 2017 through Roadrunner Records. Their fifth album, Disguise, was released in June 2019, followed by their sixth album, Scoring the End of the World, in June 2022, and their seventh album, Decades, in July 2026.

== History ==
=== Formation and early years (2004–2009) ===
Motionless in White was founded in summer of 2004 by members Chris Cerulli, who played guitar and lead vocals, Angelo Parente on drums, Frank Polumbo on guitar and Kyle White on bass during high school. For their first two shows at the Northeast Fair in Pittston, PA, the band was known as "One Way Ticket" and then as "When Breathing Stops" for the remainder of 2004. On New Year's Day of 2005, they settled on their current name. Chris Motionless and other members have noted bands such as Poison the Well, Slipknot, Marilyn Manson, Johnny Cash, Depeche Mode, and other musical groups as their inspiration. In 2005, they released their self-distributed demo.

Within the year after the release of their demo, new member Josh Balz was added as the band's keyboardist, Frank Polumbo took over on bass and new members, Michael Costanza and Thomas "TJ" Bell, were added to the band as the new guitarists, moving Chris Motionless solely to lead vocals. The band was discovered by Zach Neil while performing at a local nightclub called The Staircase. Neil signed the band first to management and then later to his record label Masquerade recordings. They recorded their first EP The Whorror which was produced by Zach Neil and mixed by Dan Malsch and released it through Masquerade Recordings/Warner music group in 2007.

After touring in support of The Whorror, Motionless in White had written enough songs to complete a full-length album. The album was named When Love Met Destruction. When Love Met Destruction was recorded in 2008 initially at Soundmine recording studio then finished at Zach Neil's home by Dave Cutrone and Zach Neil, and was released the same year on Masquerade Recordings. Neil added the band to his stage on the Warped tour with the new record in hand and the band quickly caught the attention of Shawn Milke from Alesana who offered to manage the band. Shortly thereafter Bob Becker of Fearless Records contacted Zach Neil to make an offer to buy the band's recording contract and sign the band to Fearless. The band and Neil agreed and Tragic Hero was offered to incubate the first official release to help grow the band leading up to their Fearless debut. The band was never actually signed to Tragic Hero Records.

The band parted ways with guitarist Michael Costanza and brought in current guitarist Ryan Sitkowski as his replacement. Despite being signed to Fearless before the months leading up to the release of the EP form of When Love Met Destruction, it was distributed through Tragic Hero on February 17, 2009. The song "Ghost in the Mirror" was made as the band's first ever single and had a music video produced for it.

=== Creatures and line-up change (2009–2011) ===
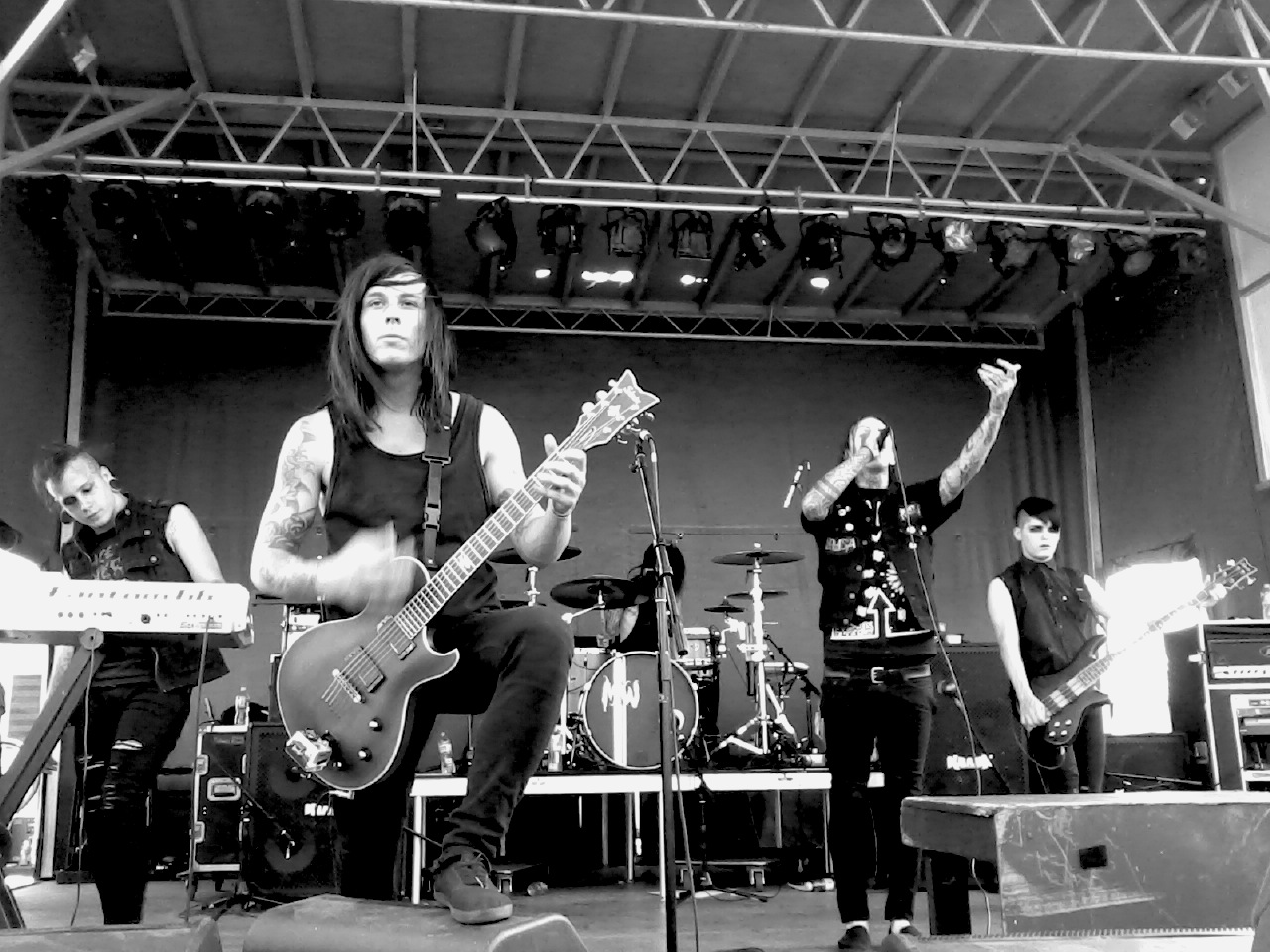
Motionless in White in 2011

After the release of When Love Met Destruction, bassist Frank Polumbo departed Motionless in White for unknown reasons, leaving Bellevue, Washington native, Ricky "Horror" Olson as their new permanent bass player in October 2009. Months later, Motionless in White entered the studio during May 2010 to record their debut full-length, Creatures with Andrew Wade as the chosen producer. The record's first single, "Abigail", premiered in Revolver Magazine on August 30 and was the released on iTunes the day after. A music video for the song was released a few months afterwards, along with following music videos over the next 2 years for title track "Creatures", the first track of the record "Immaculate Misconception" and a live music video for "Puppets (The First Snow)" which was filmed during the band's summer on The All Stars Tour in 2011.

Creatures was released on October 12, 2010, through Fearless, and claimed the 175th slot on the Billboard Top 200 charts, and No. 6 on the Heatseekers chart.

On Wednesday May 4, 2011, guitarist Thomas Joseph "TJ" Bell was fired from the band. Reasons for the matter explained from Bell's perspective were that while he was handling bass substitution duties for Escape the Fate, he was expected to meet along with the rest of Motionless in White in Orlando, Florida by that tour's end. According to the band, Bell left in the middle of Motionless in White's tour schedule to fill-in as a bassist for Escape the Fate and also did not inform the rest of the members early enough in advance that he would not be available during those weeks. This action forced the band to be without their rhythm guitar parts during their performances. Motionless in White stated "If our live performance didn't heavily depend on having 2 guitarists then it wouldn't have been a huge deal to us... but unfortunately having one guitar player in a band like ours causes your show to suffer greatly. We agreed to let TJ go," along with an explanation about how they experienced many disagreements with Bell throughout the years of being a band.

After Bell's departure, Olson then switched his position in the band from playing bass to rhythm guitar, which then left the group in-audition, once again, for a new bass player. In the tours Motionless in White performed after Olson's switch to rhythm guitar, a man with an unknown name began playing bass, finally confirmed as being Devin Sola, who now goes by "Ghost", a substitute bassist. Sola was officially confirmed as the band's new bassist on November 27, 2011.

=== Infamous (2012–2014) ===
In early 2012, Motionless in White contributed to the Kerrang! Metallica The Black Album: Covered on the song, "My Friend of Misery."

Motionless in White decided on working with two separate producers to accomplish a very wide array of sounds and styles for Infamous. It was then announced that Infamous was to be produced by Jason Suecof and musician Tim Sköld. On September 25 "Devil's Night" was released as the first single for the album. On October 9, their second single "If It's Dead, We'll Kill It" was released. On November 13, 2012, the music video for the single "Devil's Night" was released, along with the full album itself. Infamous initially hit No. 53 on the Billboard 200, No. 19 on Top Rock Albums, No. 9 on Top Independent Albums, and No. 5 on Top Hard Rock Albums.

Motionless in White's ex-drummer, Angelo Parente, announced his departure from the band on March 11 via Tumblr, saying 'After doing this since I was 17, the nonstop touring, and everything else that comes with the life of a musician has finally caught up with me.'. He has left the band on good terms, and there is no sign of internal rifts. Brandon Richter formally of 'The Witch Was Right' was announced as the replacement drummer on April 23, 2013. This action left Chris Motionless as the band's last original member.

On April 23, the band released the third single from Infamous, "America", accompanied by a lyric video. On June 3, another video, directed by Slipknot percussionist Shawn Crahan, was released for the single. The video also starred Slipknot percussionist Chris Fehn. On June 11, 2013, Motionless in White released the Deluxe Edition of Infamous, featuring remixed and remastered versions of all the original tracks, alongside two new songs, remixes by Celldweller, Combichrist and Ricky Horror, and re-recorded drums by Richter.

Motionless in White did their first full UK tour in September 2013 with The Defiled and Glamour of the Kill. They later supported acts such as In This Moment on the 'Hellpop Tour' in October to November and All That Remains in November to December 2013. Motionless in White performed at the 2013 Mayhem Festival.

=== Reincarnate (2014–2016) ===
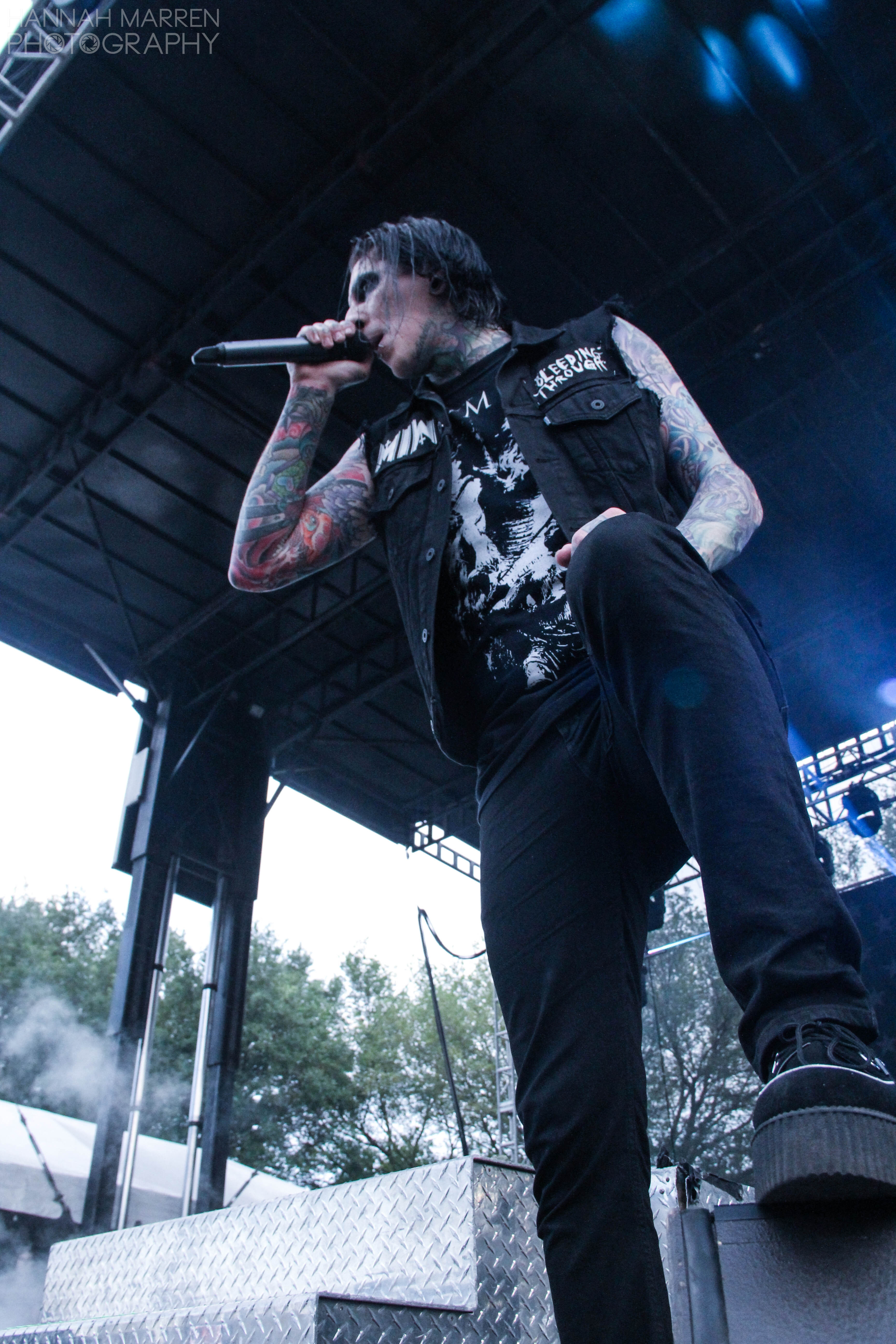
Chris Motionless performing with the band at Welcome to Rockville in Jacksonville, FL

On January 23, 2014, the band announced a short headlining tour in March with The Plot in You, Like Moths to Flames, For the Fallen Dreams and The Defiled with For Today appearing in San Antonio. Following the tour the band would enter the studio to work on their follow-up to their 2012 album, Infamous.

On February 5, Motionless in White was announced to play the Vans Warped Tour on the main stage. The same day, the band confirmed that they will be covering "Du hast" by Rammstein for the Punk Goes... compilation series, Punk Goes 90s Vol. 2. Later that month, drummer Brandon Richter released a statement that he will no longer be part of the band; however, he has thanked all of the support he has gained and has left on good terms, although he won't give out any specific reasons to leaving the band.

In an interview with Rock Sound magazine, Chris Motionless expressed that recording the third album was much easier compared to Infamous as "...the timeframe worked against me, and there was an inner conflict going on, trying to move into a different style of music and making a lot of mistakes as I went." He stated that the album's sound will contain the aggressiveness 'Creatures' had which 'Infamous' lacked in and will also have a more consistent style.

On April 23, 2014, the band's third studio album, Reincarnate, was announced through social media, with an intended release date of September 16, 2014. The band stated that they remain as a quintet and will be working with touring and session drummers. On June 11, Fearless Records released a video featuring the album's artwork and contained a teaser for their next upcoming single of the same name, which was to be released on July 1 however was delayed to July 8. The band was announced as a support act for A Day to Remember's tour titled Parks & Devastation Tour that takes place throughout September and October, and will be supporting them alongside Bring Me the Horizon and Chiodos. The band also announced a co-headline tour with gothic metal band Lacuna Coil in Europe, with the gothic metal band Devilment (fronted by Cradle of Filth frontman Dani Filth) supporting them. The tour started at the end of October continuing through November.

The band was announced as one of the acts to perform in the South by So What?! festival in March at QuikTrip Park in Grand Prairie.

During the summer of 2015 Motionless in White toured along with Slipknot, Lamb of God, and Bullet for My Valentine as part of the Summer's Last Stand Tour running from July 24 to September 5.

=== Graveyard Shift (2016–2018) ===
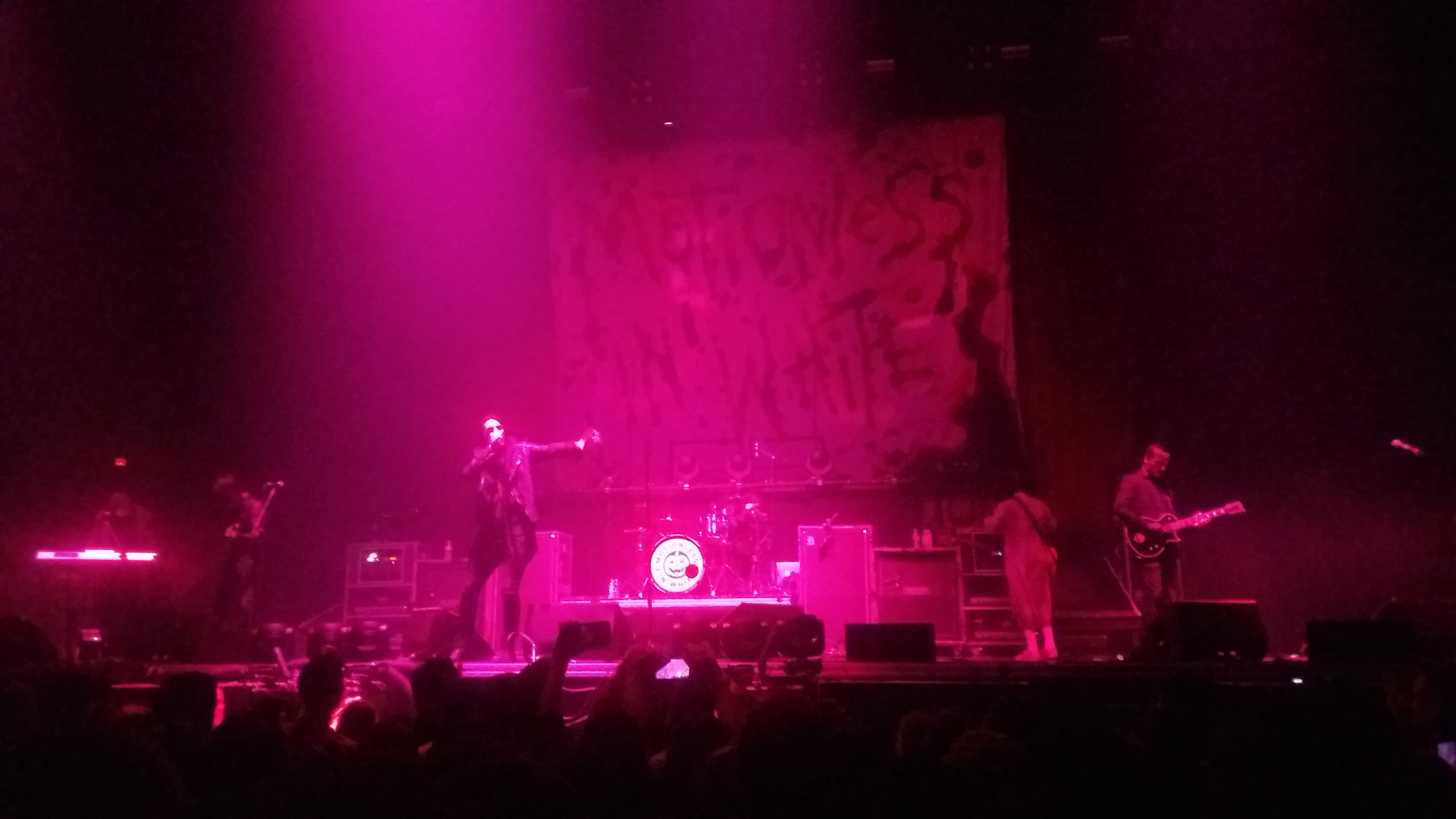
Motionless in White in 2016

Vocalist Chris Cerulli has stated that their new album will not be released through Fearless Records. On June 23, 2016, Motionless In White released the single titled "570", from the band's forthcoming studio album, which will be released via Roadrunner Records. In the fall of 2016, the band embarked on the Nocturnal Underground tour with Breaking Benjamin and Korn. On October 31, Roadrunner announced the album was to be titled Graveyard Shift. The band reached out to the fans with a contest to design the new album's artwork.

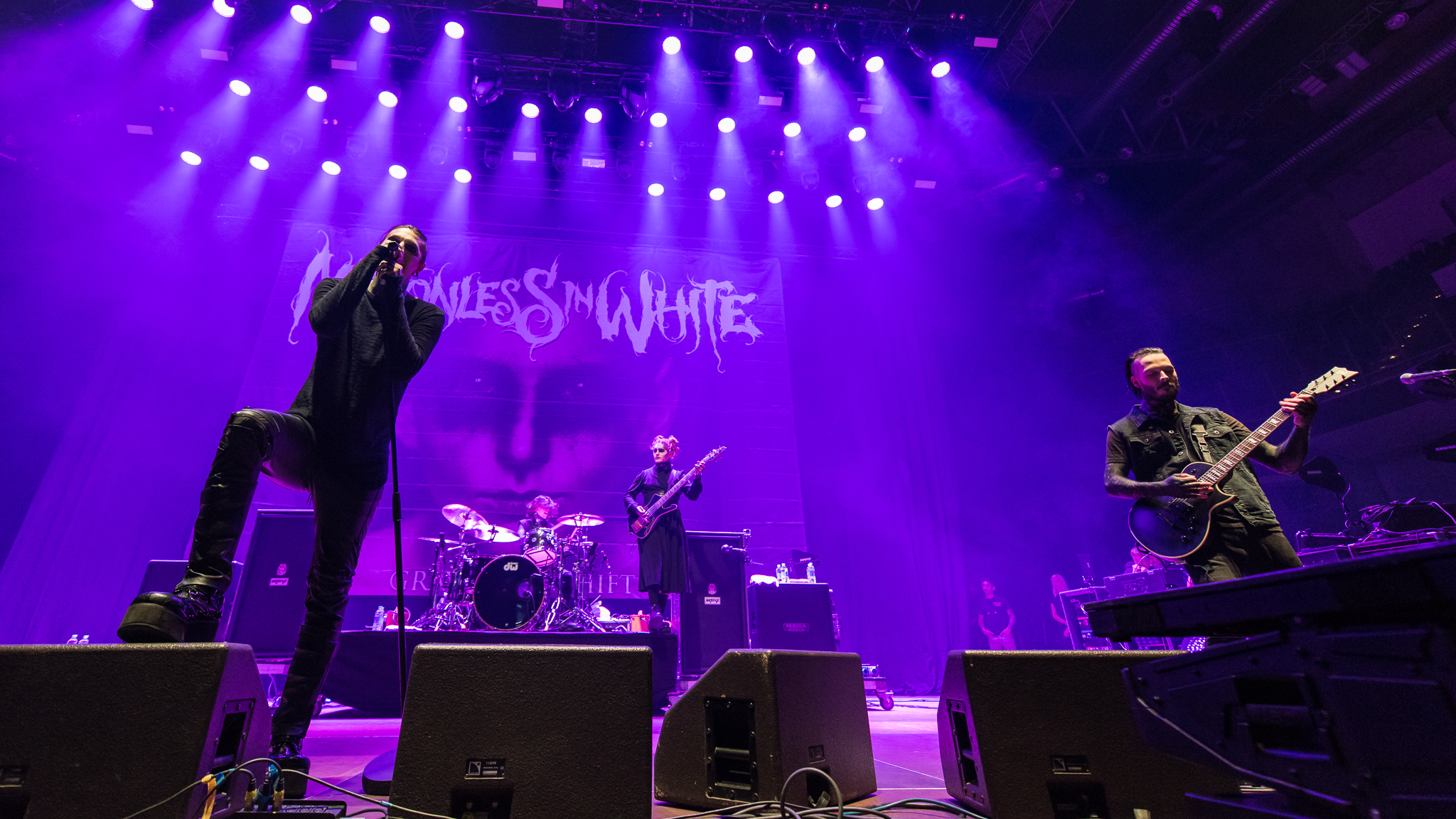
Motionless in White live at Rock im Park 2017

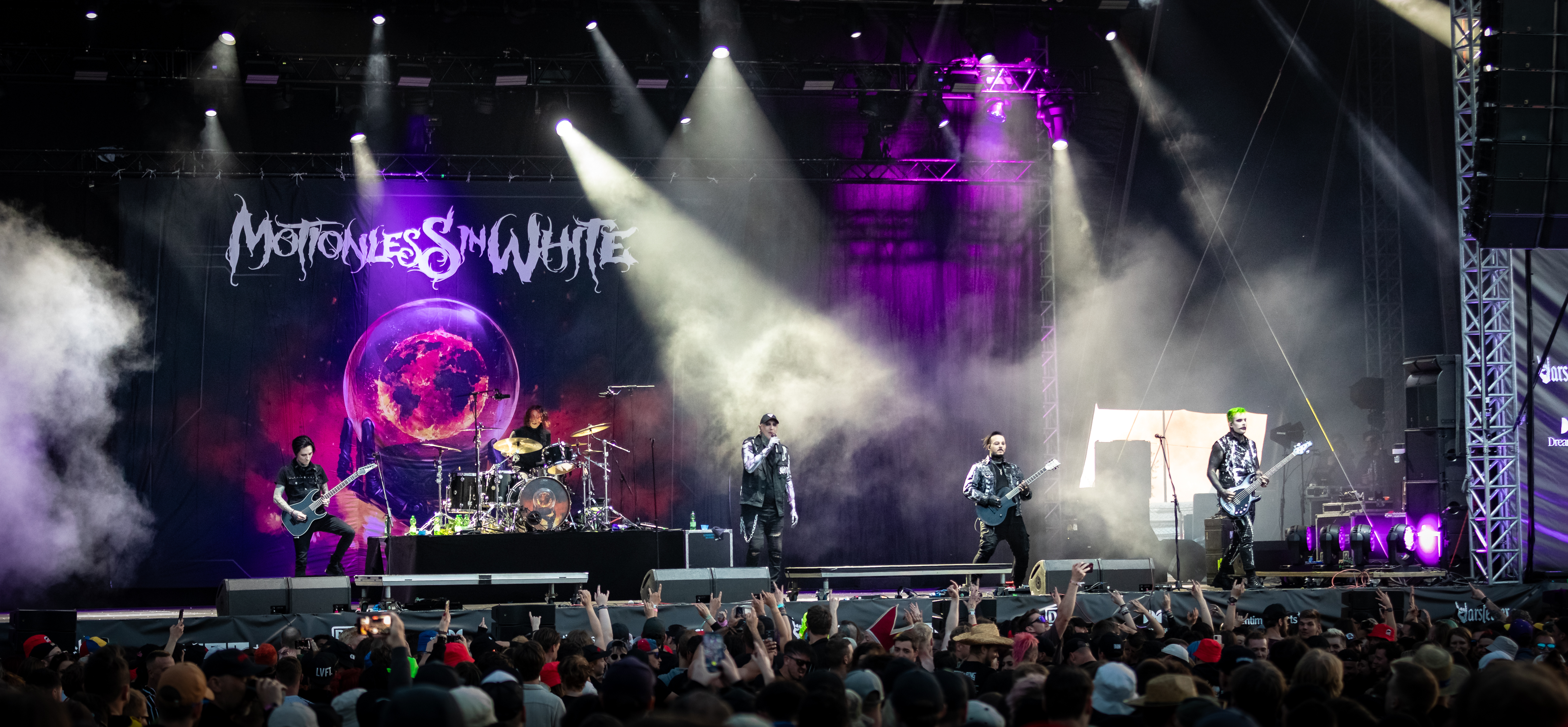
Motionless in White live at Rock am Ring 2023

On January 10, 2017, keyboardist Josh Balz announced his departure from the band after 10 full years. He cited that he wanted more time available to run his oddities parlor, "The Strange and Unusual".

On January 26, the band released the second single from Graveyard Shift, titled "Eternally Yours". A day later, it was revealed that Graveyard Shift is set to be released on May 5, 2017. The band also revealed they were opening an artwork contest for the new album, the winner of which would have their artwork featured for Graveyard Shift.

On March 3, the band revealed the album's official artwork created by Crystal Johnson and tracklist, followed by the release of their third single, "LOUD (Fuck It)".

On April 30, Motionless in White premiered their song "Rats", a few days before the initial album drop. After the album was released, the band embarked on the Half God Half Devil tour with In This Moment, touring across the United States and to multiple areas around Europe.

The band embarked on the US leg of their headlining tour; The Graveyard Shift Tour, running from September–October 2017 and will bring the tour to Europe in early 2018. Motionless In White was joined on the US portion of this tour by Miss May I and The Amity Affliction, along with special guest, William Control. As well as European/US legs from January to March 2018.

On May 4, 2018, the band announced the departure of longtime bassist Devin "Ghost" Sola, citing personal mental health problems as a major factor. Former guitarist, TJ Bell, was later announced to be filling in, in regards to the duties needed for the Summer Warped Tour festival.

=== Disguise (2018–2021) ===
On May 6, 2018, Chris Motionless announced via Instagram that a new record would be released in 2019. He claimed that he, along with Ryan Sitkowski and Ricky Olson, would begin full-time writing prior to touring with Warped Tour that summer.

Throughout the summer of 2018, the band embarked on the final cross-country run of Vans Warped Tour, spanning from June 21 to August 5, 2018. After the departure of Devin Sola, the band reunited with former guitarist TJ Bell for the tour. Once the tour wrapped, the band took the rest of the year off, with the exception of a few festivals, Halloween shows, and a club show in their hometown of Scranton, to work on the upcoming album. For their final appearances of 2018, Justin Morrow of Ice Nine Kills toured with them on bass guitar.

In early March, the band announced they would be touring over the summer with Alice Cooper and Halestorm. A few days later, they announced they would be embarking on a co-headliner with Atreyu over the course of April and early May. The day prior to the Spring Invasion tour with Atreyu beginning, the band began teasing new music through their social media accounts.

On March 24, 2019, Motionless in White announced via Instagram that Ice Nine Kills member, Justin Morrow would be leaving Ice Nine Kills and joining Motionless in White full-time on bass guitar.

On April 17, the band announced their new album Disguise set for release on June 7, 2019. On the same day, they released two singles off of the album titled "Disguise", which had been premiered at Earthday Birthday in Orlando a few days prior, and "Brand New Numb".

On May 10, the band released their third single "Undead Ahead 2: The Tale of the Midnight Ride" and its corresponding music video.

On June 5, a few days before the album was due to drop, the band premiered the song "Thoughts & Prayers" on BBC's Radio 1's Rock Show with Daniel P. Carter. This was the first appearance of lead guitarist Ryan Sitkowski performing vocals on a record. On June 27, the band released a corresponding music video for their second single of the album, "Brand New Numb".

On June 12, Motionless in White released a documentary on the recording and making of their fifth album Disguise. The documentary consists of what it was like to make the album along with what the album means to the band. There are also clips of studio jokes, guitar work, and of course vocals from the album. While the documentary unfolds, you can hear instrumentals of the whole album which makes watching the video more enjoyable for fans. The commentary has interviews of the band and what they think of the album. There are a lot of points in the video that discuss what the album means to them with Chris Motionless saying, "And with this record, I heavily gravitated towards writing about the long journey of admitting to myself that i'm struggling with a lot mentally while simultaneously being in the best and happiest place in my life, I was also in one of the darkest places and that contradiction of those feelings festered in my head and left me more and more confused by my life in general to which it then manifested into deeper and deeper destructive feelings and actions as my time ignoring it went on until one day I just lost it and broke down and there begins basically the story of so many of these songs." While the album has a lot of emotions in it, there are also different feelings for the album with Ryan Sitkowski saying that this is a "solidified version of what Motionless in White actually is". The recordings shown are the songs that can be heard across the album with the song, "Another Life" being a background track during parts of the video. Justin Morrow is shown in the documentary as he just joined the band and got to help make it as the record. It shows him doing background screams. The commentary shows what it was like to make this album and gives more insight into what the album means as a whole.

Before the band was set to embark on their "Disguise Tour" in Europe, the band embarked on "The Trick 'R Treat Tour" in which they were headliners, along with some east coast shows with In This Moment. The band also announced that they would be touring with Beartooth on "The Diseased and Disguised Tour" in January 2020. As 2019 came to a close, they announced multiple shows at European festivals over the summer such as Rock am Ring and Graspop Metal Meeting along with a show in Warsaw, Poland with August Burns Red, marking their first time ever in the country of Poland. However, all of the European shows are cancelled due to the COVID-19 pandemic.

In May 2020, during a livestream interview, Chris Motionless announced that they were already working on their next album, and assured that the songs for the album will be heavier, although the recording could be delayed due to the COVID-19 pandemic. On September 9, the band released their cover of The Killers' "Somebody Told Me" on streaming music services. On October 5, the band announced that they'll release a 10th anniversary re-issue of the album titled Creatures X on October 9.

On May 14, 2021, the band released the final of what they call "The Quarantine Experiments" in the form of a synthwave-edition of their song "Voices". On August 20, the band released a new single titled "Timebomb".

=== Scoring the End of the World (2022–2024) ===
On March 7, 2022, the band announced that they are planning to release new music on Friday, March 11, with a 30-second video teaser hinting at some potentially new music. On that day, the band officially released the single "Cyberhex" featuring Lindsay Schoolcraft along with its music video. At the same time, they officially released the cover and track list for their sixth studio album, Scoring the End of the World, which was released on June 10, 2022.

On April 14, the band unveiled the second single "Masterpiece" and its corresponding music video. On May 13, the band released the third single "Slaughterhouse" featuring Bryan Garris of Knocked Loose. On June 3, one week before the album release, the band released the title track "Scoring the End of the World" featuring Mick Gordon.

In April 2023, the band announced a summer tour dubbed "The Dark Horizon Tour" which co-headlines with In This Moment. Just a few weeks later, the band announced a fall tour with Knocked Loose, After the Burial, and Alpha Wolf titled "The Touring The End of the World Tour. On July 7, 2023, the band announced the deluxe edition of the album which is set to be released on September 8, 2023. At the same time, the band officially revealed the track list.

Motionless in White performed during the first night of WWE's WrestleMania XL on April 6, 2024, where they performed Rhea Ripley's theme "Demon in Your Dreams" prior to her Women's World Championship defence; Ripley is a long-time fan of the band and based much of her aesthetic as a wrestler upon Cerulli.

=== Decades (2024–present) ===
In August 2024, Motionless in White announced they were working on a follow-up album to Scoring the End of the World. The band said they were taking their time with its writing and recording, prioritizing quality over maintaining their momentum in popularity gains in the 2020s.

In 2025, active members Cerulli, Mauro, Morrow, Olson, and Sitkowski, as well as former members Balz, Bell, and Parente, were inducted into the Luzerne County Arts & Entertainment Hall of Fame.

The band was confirmed to be performing at the 2026 Sonic Temple music festival in Columbus, Ohio.

On January 28, 2026, the band released a new single titled "Afraid of the Dark". In February, it became their first number 1 song Billboard Hard Rock chart.

The band played a show at Welcome to Rockville taking place in Daytona Beach, Florida in May 2026.

Following teasers released via social media, on May 6 the band announced their seventh studio album, titled Decades, would release July 17, 2026. Alongside the announcement, they released the album's second single, "Playing God", featuring Corey Taylor of Slipknot; a sequel to "Soft" from Graveyard Shift, the song is themed around toxic internet culture. The album's third single, "R.I.P.", featuring Skylar Grey was released June 17.

The album released on July 17, alongside the release of "Fight Like Hell" as a single. In an interview with Valentino Petrarca from The Aquarian, Cerulli disclosed he took influences from 80s rock artists like Bon Jovi, Alice Cooper, and Journey, while writing the album.

== Musical style and influences ==
The band is described by AllMusic as a blend of metalcore, gothic metal and industrial. They have also been called "horror-metal", industrial metalcore, nu metal, and hard rock.

The group's song structure commonly features intricate riffs coupled with occasional blast beats during verses and breakdowns present in songs. The band's keyboard effects are also noted, having been claimed to add a "dark and uneasy atmosphere" to the group's music on their debut album Creatures. The sound on their second album, Infamous, was said to have resembled Marilyn Manson's by Alternative Press, Revolver and Kerrang!

The band's lyrics have explored themes and topics such as religious trauma syndrome, culture of the United States, politics, the COVID-19 pandemic, and anti-capitalism. The lyrics are occasionally profane, and have been known to incorporate slang words such as "bitch".

The band members themselves have stated that they are influenced from a wide variety of artists such as AFI, Aiden, As I Lay Dying, Atreyu, August Burns Red, Avenged Sevenfold, Bauhaus, the Black Dahlia Murder, Bleeding Through, Breaking Benjamin, Christian Death, Cradle of Filth, the Cure, Danzig, Depeche Mode, Eighteen Visions, Every Time I Die, Gojira, HIM, Black Sabbath, Himsa, It Dies Today, KMFDM, Johnny Cash, Korn, Sex Pistols, Linkin Park, Marilyn Manson, Misfits, Metallica, Morrissey, Nine Inch Nails, Underoath, Psyclon Nine, Rammstein, Rob Zombie, Slipknot, the Sisters of Mercy, the Smiths, and Suicide Commando.

== Band members ==
Motionless in White live at Full Rewind 2024

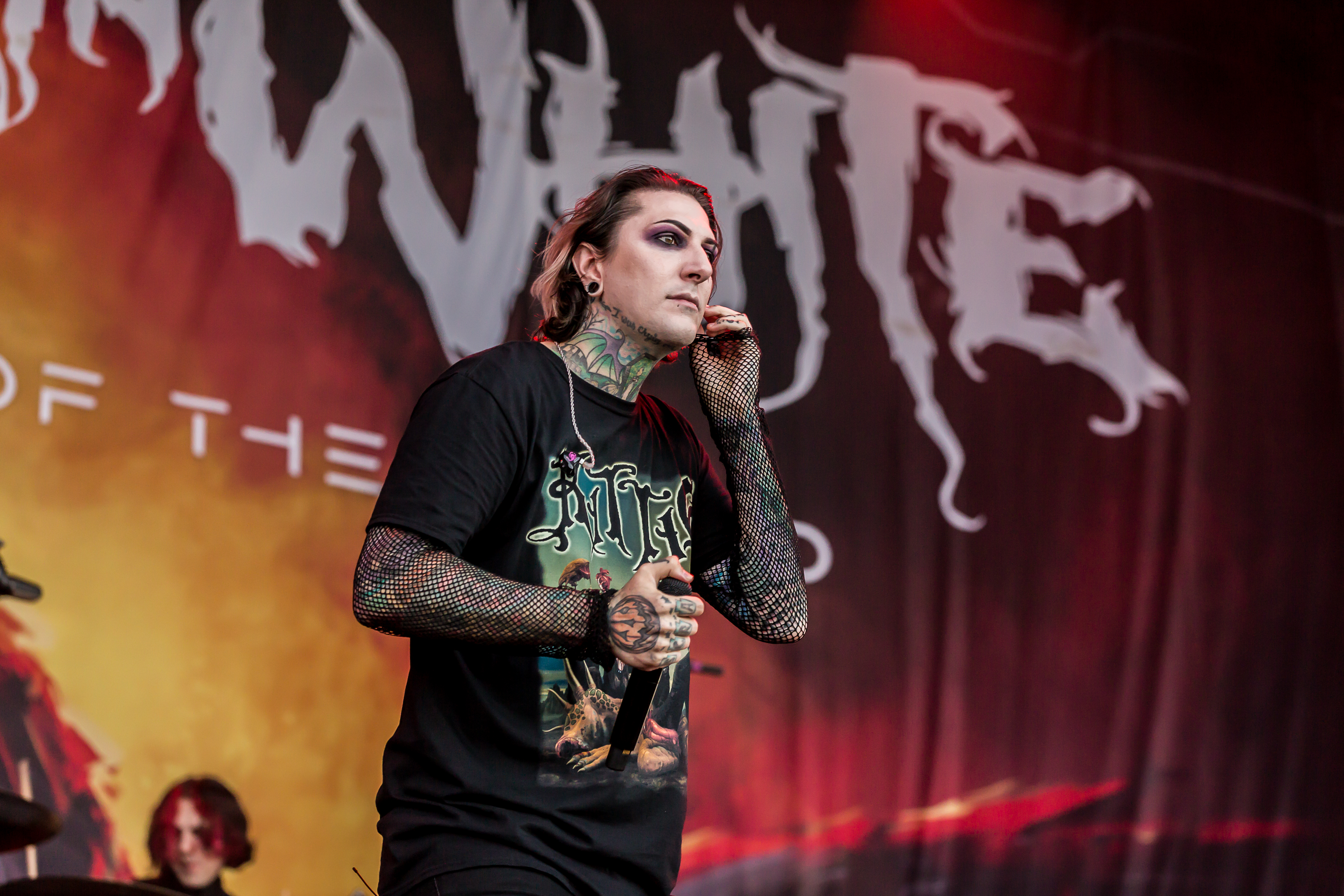
Chris Motionless

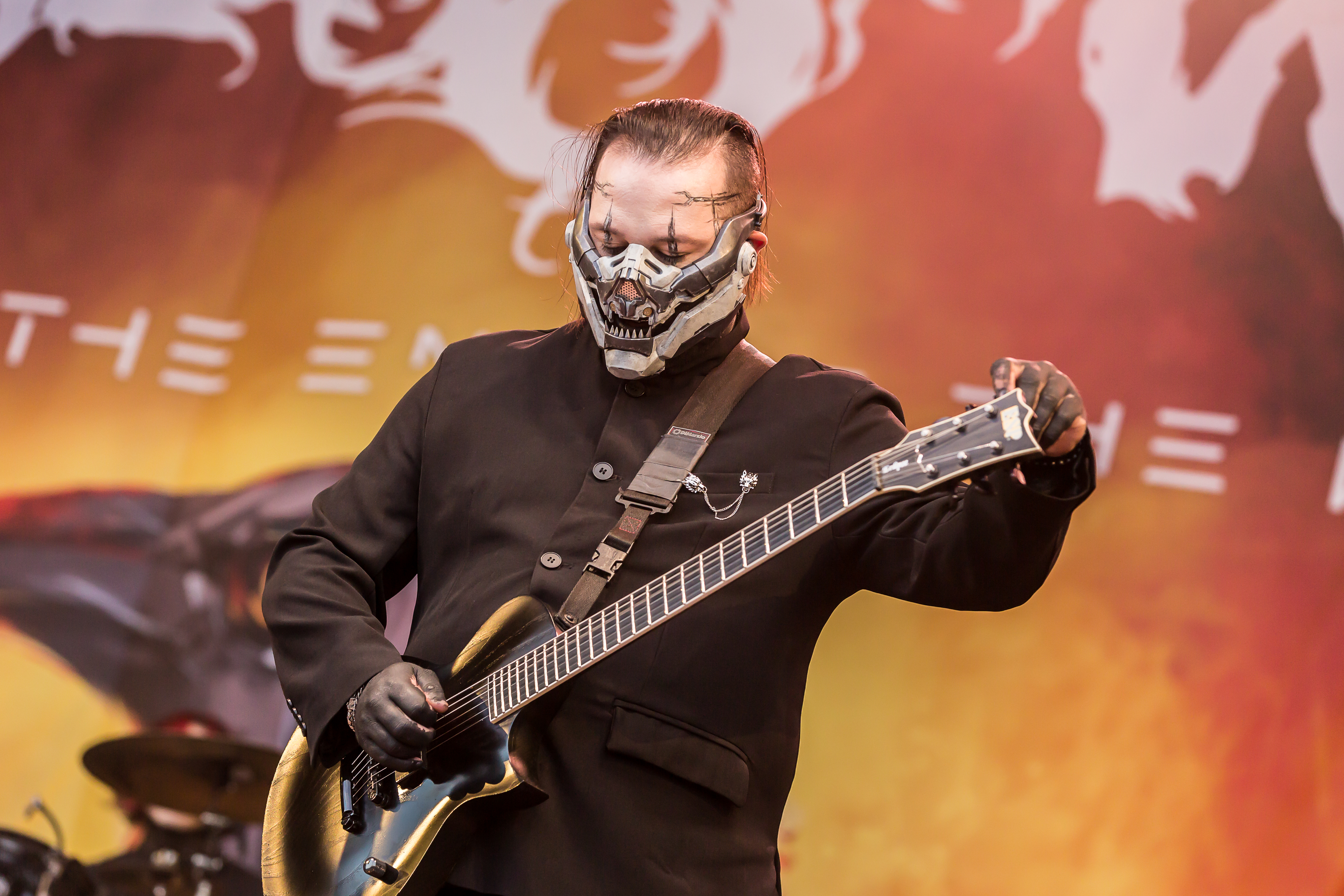
Ryan Sitkowski

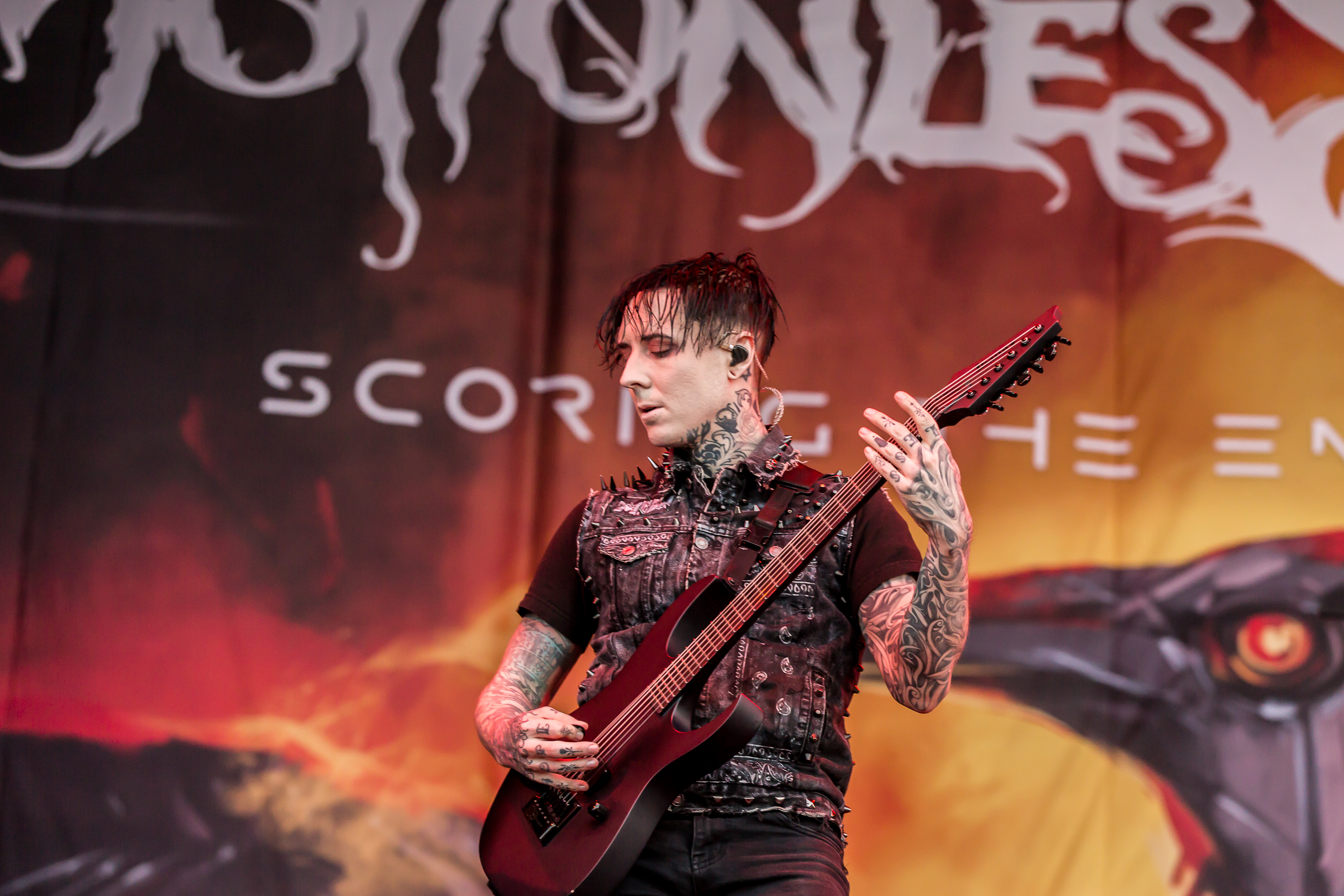
Ricky Horror

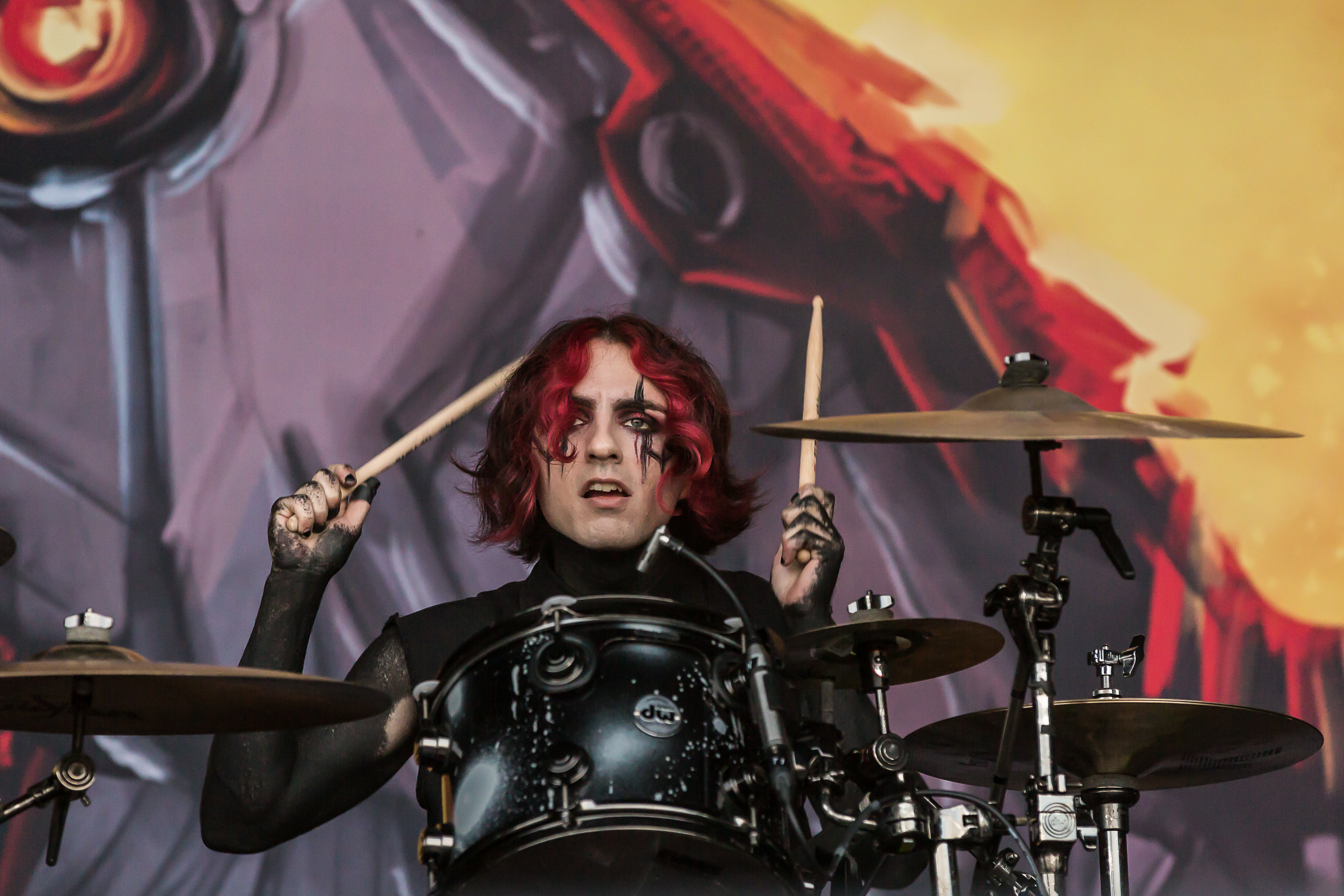
Vinny Mauro

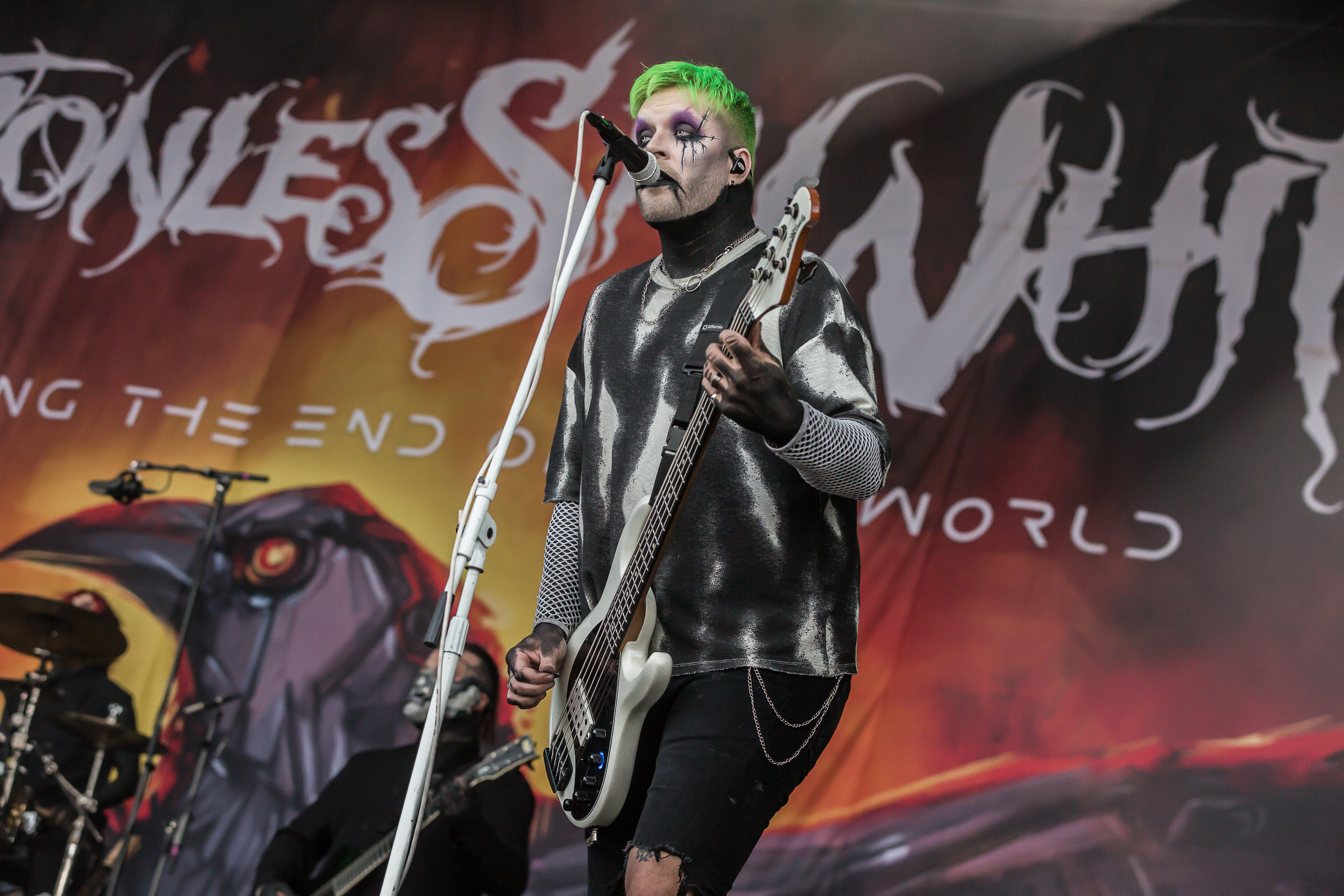
Justin Morrow

Current

- Chris "Motionless" Cerulli – lead vocals (2004–present); rhythm guitar (2004–2006)
- Ryan Sitkowski – lead guitar (2008–present); bass (2011, 2018–2019)
- Ricky "Horror" Olson – rhythm guitar (2011–present); co-lead vocals (2020–present); bass (2009–2011, 2018–2019); backing vocals (2009–2020)
- Vinny Mauro – drums (2014–present)
- Justin Morrow – bass, backing vocals (2019–present; touring member 2018–2019)

Former

- Kyle White – bass (2004–2006)
- Mike Costanza – lead guitar (2006–2008)
- Frank Polumbo – bass (2006–2009); lead guitar (2004–2006)
- Thomas "TJ" Bell – rhythm guitar, co-lead vocals (2006–2011); bass, backing vocals (touring member 2018)
- Angelo Parente – drums (2004–2013)
- Josh Balz – keyboards, backing vocals (2006–2017)
- Devin "Ghost" Sola – bass, backing vocals (2011–2018)
- Brandon "Rage" Richter – drums (2013–2014)

Session and touring

- Kimber Parrish – bass (2011)
- Pablo Viveros Segura – drums, backing vocals (2012)
- Marie-Christine Allard – keyboards (2017)
- Tom Hane – drums (2014, 2017, 2019)

Timeline

== Discography ==
- Creatures (2010)
- Infamous (2012)
- Reincarnate (2014)
- Graveyard Shift (2017)
- Disguise (2019)
- Scoring the End of the World (2022)
- Decades (2026)
