= DJ Spanish Fly =

American DJ and rapper (born 1970)

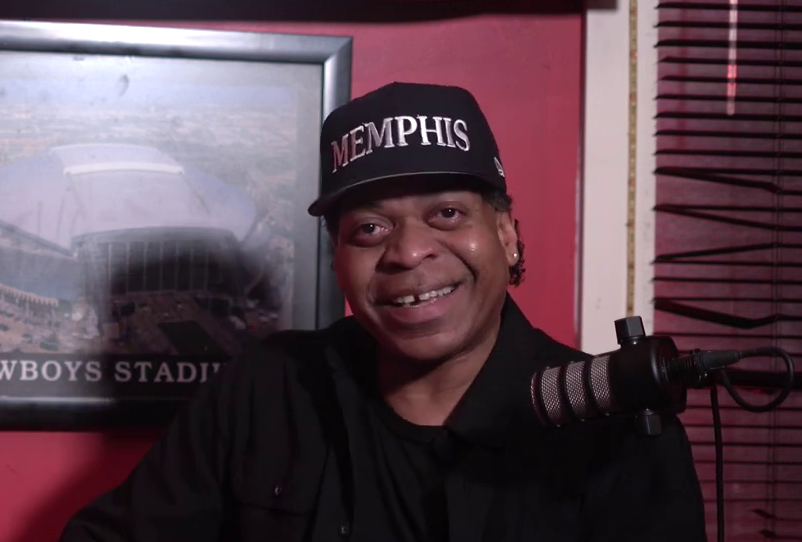
- DJ Spanish Fly in 2025

Background information
- Born: Antonio D. Kimbrough; January 16, 1970 (age 56); Memphis, Tennessee, U.S.
- Origin: North Memphis, Tennessee, U.S.
- Genres: Hip hop; Memphis rap; Phonk
- Occupations: Dj, producer, rapper, writer
- Instruments: turntables; sampler; Drum machine; TR 808
- Years active: 1980s–present

DJ Spanish Fly (born Antonio D. Kimbrough on January 16, 1970) is an American DJ, rapper, writer, and music producer from Memphis, Tennessee. Known as the "Godfather of Memphis Rap", he is credited with pioneering the Memphis rap scene and influencing the development of the phonk genre. DJ Spanish Fly also introduced the "jooking" dance style.

== Early life ==
DJ Spanish Fly was born and raised in Memphis, Tennessee, in the South Memphis neighborhood of Clementine, located near Elvis Presley Blvd. Growing up in a city with a rich musical heritage, he was exposed to blues, soul, and funk, which significantly influenced his musical development.

== Career ==
Spanish Fly began his career in the mid-1980s, DJing at local parties and clubs. He was part of the "True Blue Cru," a group known for its dedication to hip-hop and unique promotional methods. His early performances were marked by beatboxing, rapping, and mixing, which led to his residency at Club No Name, a key venue in Memphis. He was, according to Jean-Pierre Labarthe, one of the first to introduce hip hop in Memphis nightclubs. He also made regular appearances on local station 101.1 FM's Hotmix Hour between 1984 and 1985.

By the late 1980s, DJ Spanish Fly was a prominent figure in Memphis, known for transforming the local music scene with his slower, bass-heavy sound featuring 808 beats and gangsta themes. Given his music's themes, he distributed his music on self-produced audio cassettes, Memphis nightclubs not wanting to play this type of music. His mixtapes, distributed across the South, played a crucial role in establishing the Memphis rap sound.

His mixtapes were influential across the South, often copied and shared at major events like Mardi Gras in New Orleans and Freaknik in Atlanta. His work laid the groundwork for future Memphis artists, including Three 6 Mafia, 8Ball & MJG, DJ Squeeky, and others.

DJ Spanish Fly remains active, continuing to perform and produce new music. He has collaborated with various artists and featured on albums like Three 6 Mafia's Las 2 Walk (2008). In 2009, he has been a DJ on Hot 107 radio in Memphis.

In 2021, he continued to DJ at parties, and played on the Fly by Night radio show on WYXR 91.7 FM. His ongoing influence is evident in contemporary Southern rap.

== Influence and legacy ==
DJ Spanish Fly is considered a pioneer of Memphis rap, a genre characterized by its dark, lo-fi beats and explicit lyrics. His work at clubs like "No Name" and "Expo" during the late 1980s and early 1990s marked a significant shift from disco to a more aggressive, underground sound.

His song Smokin' Onion has been particularly influential, being the first song to introduce the Triggerman beat, which was later used in many Southern hip hop songs. The song is built around a gangsta rap narrative and evokes the use of cannabis. His song Gangsta Walk would also give birth to an eponymous dance, which is often considered as an ancestor of Memphis jookin.

During the 2000s and the 2010s, his songs enjoyed a revival thanks to music sharing on the Internet.

Spanish Fly's influence on Memphis rap was highlighted in Season 4 of the Netflix series Hip Hop Evolution, which explores his impact on the genre and the broader hip-hop landscape. In 2022, part of Lil Buck's dance show Memphis Jookin': The Show is dedicated to representing DJ Spanish Fly's influence on the Memphis hip hop scene.

DJ Spanish Fly's contributions to hip-hop have been acknowledged locally and nationally. In 2006, he received the Pioneer of Memphis Hip-Hop award from the Unified Memphis Artist Association (UMAA). His influence is recognized by artists such as Three 6 Mafia, Project Pat, and Yo Gotti.

== Partial discography ==
- Unfinished Business (1986)
- Triggaman Break (1988)
- Smokin’ Onion (1989)
- Get Buck Motherf**a* (1990)
- DJ Spanish Fly: The Mixtape (1991)

== See also ==
- Memphis rap
- Three 6 Mafia
- 8Ball & MJG
- History of Southern hip-hop
