= Homicidal Lifestyle =

Studio album by Gangsta Pat
- Released: January 14, 1997
- Genre: Gangsta rap, Southern hip hop
- Label: Power Records
- Producer: LeRoy McMath

Gangsta Pat chronology
| Deadly Verses (1995) | Homicidal Lifestyle (1997) | The Story of My Life (1997) |

Professional ratings
Review scores
| Source | Rating |
|---|---|
| AllMusic | 1.5/5 stars |

Homicidal Lifestyle is an album by the American rapper Gangsta Pat, released in 1997.

The album peaked at No. 68 on Billboard's Top R&B Albums chart.

== Critical reception ==
AllMusic wrote that the album "has a couple of good grooves and rhymes scattered throughout the album, but it's hard to take any record whose highlight is a by-the-books party number called 'I Wanna Smoke' all that seriously."

== Track listing ==
1. "Instructions" – 1:04
2. "I Wanna Smoke" [Remix] – 4:47
3. "Creep Wit a Nigga" (featuring Lil' Tec) – 3:50
4. "Killa" (skit) – 1:02
5. "Empty tha Clip" – 4:49
6. "How Deep Is Yo Luv" (featuring Hollo Point) – 5:57
7. "Boddies on My 9" – 4:47
8. "Dead Presidents" – 4:29
9. "Blunted up (Skit)" – 2:02
10. "Homicidal Lifestyle" – 4:35
11. "Lay Me Down" (featuring Lil' Tec) – 4:39
12. "Deadly Verses '97" (featuring Villain) – 3:36
13. "I Wanna Smoke" (featuring Psycho) – 5:09
14. "Murdur" – 3:38
