= Tear Yo Club Down =

Studio album by Gangsta Pat
- Released: November 9, 1999
- Genre: Gangsta rap, Southern hip-hop
- Length: 51:56
- Label: Redrum
- Producer: Patric "Too Big" Hall

Gangsta Pat chronology
Gangsta Pat & the Street Muthafuckas (1998)	Tear Yo Club Down (1999)	Show Ya Grill (2000)

Professional ratings
Review scores
Source	Rating
Allmusic	3/5 stars

Tear Yo Club Down is a 1999 album by Memphis underground rapper Gangsta Pat that was recorded in response to comments made by Three 6 Mafia in The Source magazine referring to him as "a fake ass rapper with no skills." Though many considered Pat's retaliation a desperate attempt for publicity, the album is still considered one of his best works. This album is also considered the door opener for many other disses to Three 6 by unknown rappers or other former members, the most known being Atlanta rapper, T-Rock and his tracks, "My Little Arm" & "Fuck 3 6".

== Track listing ==
1. Smoke Somethin' - 3:58
2. All They Wanna - 4:20
3. I Let'em Know - 4:00
4. Nigga's I Hang Wit - 4:00
5. We Buck up N Dis - 4:07
6. G'N 4 Life - 4:23
7. Interview One - 1:02
8. Gangsta Party - 4:02
9. My Gator's - 4:01
10. It's Friday Night - 4:01
11. It's All Good - 3:58
12. I Need Your Money - 4:14
13. Tear Yo Club Down (Three 6 Mafia Diss) - 4:30
14. Interview Two - 1:06
