= Virginia hip-hop =

American regional hip-hop scene

- Stylistic origins: Southern hip-hop; East Coast hip-hop; contemporary R&B
- Cultural origins: Early 1990s, Virginia Beach, Virginia

Virginia hip-hop refers to the regional hip-hop scene centered in the U.S. state of Virginia. The scene took shape in the late 1980s and early 1990s, and is distinguished by a sound that some would call "futuristic" and "high tech" and is often characterized by a spacey sound.

== Early history ==
Much of Virginia hip-hop comes from Virginia Beach and the Hampton Roads area, which did not have a significant local music industry until R&B singer Teddy Riley moved there in 1990. This lack of a preexisting music scene was part of Riley's motive for the move, as he hoped to find and promote undiscovered musicians from the region. Riley discovered the Neptunes when they performed at a high school talent show; though he did not have the resources to sign them at that time, he granted them access to his studio, where group members Pharrell Williams and Chad Hugo began to contribute production and songwriting to projects like Blackstreet's debut album.

At the time, Williams was also part of a local group called Surrounded by Idiots, whose other members included Timbaland and Magoo. During this period, Timbaland met Missy Elliott—then part of an R&B group called Fayze—and the two quickly connected over their similar artistic interests. Chonita Coleman, another member of Fayze, later secured an appearance for the group at the after-party of a Jodeci concert in the region; the group caught the attention of Jodeci's DeVante Swing, who invited Fayze to his Swing Mob collective and renamed the group Sista. Timbaland and Magoo followed soon afterward, as Swing had been impressed by Timbaland's production on Sista's demo tapes. During their time in the Swing Mob, Elliott and Timbaland were forbidden by DeVante Swing from watching TV or listening to the radio, a move that was intended to prevent them from copying established trends; this period of isolation is regarded as the time during which the two artists began to create their signature styles.

Outside of the Virginia Beach region, Richmond-based rapper Skillz released his debut album, From Where???, during this period. Though the album employed an East Coast hip-hop style, it was nevertheless the first Virginia hip-hop album to be published nationwide.

== Rise to fame ==
Missy Elliott and Timbaland separated from the Swing Mob in 1994, but their time working under DeVante Swing had provided them with connections in the music industry, and they began receiving invitations to contribute songwriting and production to other artists' projects. Timbaland achieved particular success in 1996, producing Ginuwine's single "Pony" and large portions of Aaliyah's album One in a Million; these accomplishments made both him and Elliott into highly sought-after artists. The pair capitalized on their newfound popularity by releasing Elliott's first solo album, Supa Dupa Fly, to commercial and critical success in 1997. This sequence of releases showcased and popularized Timbaland's distinctive production style, a "lackadaisical, spacey" sound characterized by unusual drum patterns, heavily distorted vocal samples, and instrumental samples from Asian and North African music. Elliott also cultivated her own distinctive style of performance, which spanned rapping, singing, and talking, as well as the usage of onomatopoeia and neologisms. She paired this with a visual aesthetic that eschewed the sexualized "video vixen" look; this divergence was exemplified by Elliott's inflatable "trash bag" outfit in the music video for "The Rain (Supa Dupa Fly)".

The final years of the 1990s then saw the Neptunes ascend to success. After leaving Virginia for New York, the duo began producing songs for that city's rappers, with Noreaga's 1998 single "Superthug" and Ol' Dirty Bastard's 1999 "Got Your Money" being two of their most important early successes. The style that the Neptunes crafted during this period shared some reference points with Timbaland's, including heavy usage of synthesizers and samples of international music, but they used these elements to build a more minimalistic sound that juxtaposed heavy bass drum hits against "soft, isolated" melodies. The Neptunes also shared Timbaland's interest in blending the boundaries between hip-hop and pop; for instance, the Neptunes provided the beat for Britney Spears' "I'm a Slave 4 U", and Timbaland contributed extensively to Justin Timberlake's first two solo albums.

Virginia hip-hop's celebrity producers would go on to establish record labels of their own. Timbaland founded the Interscope imprint Beat Club, whose first signee was Georgia's Bubba Sparxxx, whereas the Neptunes founded the Arista-backed Star Trak label and signed the Virginia duo Clipse. Clipse were longtime acquaintances of the Neptunes who had previously recorded a never-released album for Elektra; after signing to Star Trak, they recorded and released the Neptunes-produced Lord Willin' in 2002. On this album, they displayed an aggressive East Coast rap style, which they would subsequently refine further into the 2006 "coke-rap epic" Hell Hath No Fury.

== Later years ==
Although Virginia's hip-hop producers became pop radio fixtures in the early 2000s, they did not manage to foster an interconnected local scene in the Virginia Beach area, with the result that—as their individual careers waned—Virginia hip-hop largely disappeared from the mainstream. This shift was exacerbated by events like Missy Elliott's hiatus from recording and the breakup of Clipse.

Throughout the 2010s, former Clipse member Pusha T released a series of solo albums and was named the president of Kanye West's GOOD Music label. Other hip-hop artists to emerge from Virginia in this decade include Richmond's Lil Ugly Mane, a former hardcore punk musician who went on to perform Memphis-inspired rap, and Hampton's DRAM, whose music blends singing and rapping in a lighthearted, funk-inspired fashion.

In the 2020s, notable hip-hop artists from Virginia include Tommy Richman and Shaboozey (both from Woodbridge) and Nettspend (from Richmond).

== Bibliography ==
- Abrams, Jonathan (2022). The Come Up: An Oral History of the Rise of Hip-Hop. Crown. ISBN 9781984825155.
- Canaday, Laurie (2010). "Virginia Is for Lovers and Rappers: Hampton Roads Rappers, Changing the Game". In Hess, Mickey (ed.). Hip Hop in America: A Regional Guide. Vol. 2. ABC-CLIO. pp. 495–522. ISBN 9780313343223.
- Sarig, Roni (2007). Third Coast: Outkast, Timbaland, and How Hip-hop Became a Southern Thing. Da Capo Press. ISBN 9780306814303.
- Westhoff, Ben (2011). Dirty South: Outkast, Lil Wayne, Soulja Boy, and the Southern Rappers who Reinvented Hip-Hop. Chicago Review Press. ISBN 9781569766064.
