= Gangsta Walking =

African American street dance

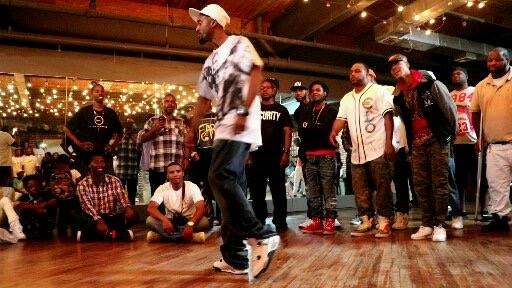
Jaquency last solo dance battle Jaquency vs Wolf from the legendary group G-Style "GangstaWalkin" at the 5th Annual of the (Old School vs New School ) dance venue

Gangsta Walking, also known as G-Walk, Buckin', Tickin', Jookin', and Choppin', is an African American street dance that began among African-American communities in Memphis, Tennessee in the 1980s.

== History ==
In the 1980s, the Bovan Crime Family created a dance in Memphis, Tennessee known as the Bovan Walk, from which Gangsta Walking later derived. Prior to its growth in local popularity when the song "Gangsta Walk" debuted, Gangsta Walking was frequently done when songs, such as Triggaman, were played by DJ Spanish Fly at Club Expo and Club No Name. Gangsta Walking was earliest characterized in the song, "Gangsta Walk," by DJ Spanish Fly in the late 1980s. Memphis-style Gangsta Walking ultimately developed from New Orleans-style Buck Dancing and Bounce music via the Buck Jump, which includes stylized chanting and a high-energy crunk style; it adopted the motions of Buck Jumping, such as arm swinging and heavy stepping, and contributed an additional march in circles onto the dance floor. The Gangsta Walk was showcased nationally in the 1993 music video, "Gangsta", by the group G-Style, whose members were Romeo, Wolf, and Hurricane. Three 6 Mafia later performed Gangsta Walking as well.

== Perception of Gangsta Walking ==
Regarding the early stages in the development of Gangsta Walking at local Memphis clubs, DJ Spanish Fly stated: "And then when it was known that it was time to do the buck jump when I come on, that's when it was on because everybody was organised. I came up and you’d just see 'em. A good 300 people could fit on the dance floor, no problem. And they'd go in a big circle, a big wide circle. You could feel the air hit you and shit when they was goin' around buckin'."

In the 1993 music video, "Gangsta", by the group G-Style, G-Style member Romeo states: "We feel that getting buck can release frustration, have fun, and be cool all at the same time."

== Types of Gangsta Walk ==
It's basically a large circular kind of line dancing which the whole club basically would do this dance and rotate around the club clockwise or counterclockwise.

— John “J-Dogg” Shaw, independent distributor/historian

There are variations of styles for the Gangsta Walk:

- One particular style requires the dancer to take (in a jerking motion) quick steps, stomp, twists and throwing their arms around all while moving to a beat, the best example being Crunchy Black's style, referred to as G-Walking. The style is considered the basis of all Gangsta Walking done in Memphis since the 1980s.
- Another style requires three or more people hopping around in a circle in a rhythmic motion, while throwing their hands into the air and yelling "Get Buck" or the lyrics to a Buck song. This style of the Gangsta Walk is more commonly referred to as the G-Train. It is said that this style was banned from the clubs shortly after being created due to the wildness it invoked in performers as well as onlookers. Reminders of its existence are still left behind in older clubs or closed down night spots in Memphis.
- The most known style of Gangsta Walking is within the standard crunk atmosphere, involving a crowd of people slamming and pushing off one another on the dance floor.
- The most famous and practiced style of Gangsta Walking in Memphis takes aspects from other street dance styles, such as liquid dancing (e.g., the wave, tutting, tracing, contours, hand flowing), the robot, locking, popping, gliding, and breakdancing, and combines them with the dance's classic steps. The most recognizable moves in the dance are moves similar to the two-step between making another motion and spinning or walking on the tips of their toes. This style of the Gangsta Walk is mostly done by the younger generations who grew up shortly after the invention of Buck music, thus titling it Buckin'.
- Jookin' took the classic steps and combined a much smoother look caused by music changes in Memphis hip hop during the early 1990s. Jookin' is most noted for not only its smooth steps, but its heavy introduction of pantomiming into the dance styles. Jookin' emphasized footwork in a way that focused the crowd's attention on the feet. Jookin' is especially characterized by the dancers' abilities in sliding and stepping movements.
- Buckin' brought in the exaggerated movements of Gangsta Walking and Jookin'. The movements were made to appear more expansive due to the buckness (exaggerated style) of the dancer – the most explosive style of Gangsta Walking. Buckers began to lift the slide (of the feet) off the ground, creating even higher glides than in previous styles.
- Choppin' developed in the mid-1990s as dancers in Memphis started to add the animated effect of Gangsta Walking, Jookin', and Buckin' to the dance floor. Choppin' consisted of stiffening the muscles until they began to vibrate and then moving while trying to create a very stiff type of Gangsta Walk.
- Icin', the newest form of Gangsta Walking, is most known for the ability to slide with one foot while gliding with the other. Icers give the illusions of ice skating through the emphasis of movements they applied while gliding across the floor. Another name for it is "Blazin'." Icin' also included different ways of "freezing" the body parts while carrying oneself around the floor.
- Basics of all the styles include stepping, pacmans, and buck jumps.

== Notable Jookers ==
- Lil Buck
- Ladia Yates
- Lil Glish
- Yung & Well

== Music videos ==
- Al Kapone - "Buckin' and Jookin'"
- Da Volunteers feat. MJG - "Favorite Color"
- Flume and Chet Faker - "Drop the Game"
- Huey feat T-Pain - "G5"
- Janelle Monáe feat. Big Boi - "Tightrope"
- Project Pat - "Raised in the Projects"
- Three 6 Mafia feat.Chamillionaire - "Doe Boy Fresh"
- Three 6 Mafia feat. Bow Wow and Project Pat - "Side 2 Side (Remix)"
- Three 6 Mafia feat. Lil' Flip - "Ridin' Spinners"

== See also ==
- Crip Walk
- Gangs in Memphis, Tennessee
