= All About Comin' Up =

Studio album by Gangsta Pat
- Released: November 16, 1992
- Genre: Gangsta rap
- Length: 49:56
- Label: Wrap/Ichiban
- Producer: LeRoy McMath

Gangsta Pat chronology
#1 Suspect (1991)	All About Comin' Up (1992)	Sex, Money, & Murder (1994)

Professional ratings
Review scores
Source	Rating
Allmusic	1.5/5 stars

All About Comin' Up is an album by Gangsta Pat.

== Track listing ==
1. "All About Comin' Up" - 3:12
2. "Stay Away from Cali" - 4:31
3. "I'm Still the Gangsta" - 4:41
4. "Gangsta Groove" - 4:11
5. "Spend the Night" - 4:39
6. "My Neighborhood" - 3:47
7. "Gangsta Boogie" - 4:18
8. "Watookmesolong" - 4:49
9. "Fatal Attraction" - 4:06
10. "Gangstas Need Love, Too" - 6:24
11. "My Name Ain't Rover" - 3:30
12. "Dedication" - 2:00
