= Southern hip-hop =

Music genre in the Southern United States

- Stylistic origins: Hip-hop; East Coast hip-hop; West Coast hip-hop
- Cultural origins: Mid 1980s, Southern United States

Subgenres
- Bounce; chopped and screwed; crunk; Memphis rap; Miami bass; phonk; plugg; trap

Regional scenes
- Atlanta; Houston; Memphis; Miami; New Orleans

Southern hip-hop or Southern rap, also known colloquially as Dirty South music, is hip-hop music from the Southern United States. As hip-hop spread beyond its origins in New York City, several Southern cities began developing their own hip-hop scenes in the 1980s; in particular, Atlanta, Houston, New Orleans, Miami, and Memphis have become regional hip-hop hubs. Typical characteristics of the Southern hip-hop sound include a focus on bass-heavy beats; relatively little use of sampling, in favor of live or synthesized instrumentation; and a decreased emphasis on lyrical complexity, instead incorporating other vocal styles such as call-and-response chants or heavily processed singing. Much Southern hip-hop is targeted toward environments like nightclubs, and popular dances such as twerking have emerged in close connection with the genre. Southern hip-hop also encompasses a wide range of subgenres, including trap, crunk, and bounce, among others.

The earliest Southern hip-hop act to attain national attention was Miami's 2 Live Crew, who were at the forefront of the Miami bass scene in the late 1980s and who won a highly publicized legal battle against officials seeking to criminalize their work as obscene. Houston's Geto Boys followed around 1990, with a hardcore hip-hop style that also courted controversy. As the 1990s progressed, Outkast achieved both critical and commercial success; the group's defiant response to being booed at the 1995 Source Awards has become one of the genre's most highly discussed incidents. Meanwhile in New Orleans, two independent record labels—No Limit and Cash Money—signed major distribution deals that led their artists to national prominence in the decade's later years.

In the 2000s, a series of popular hip-hop subgenres emerged from Atlanta. Crunk was widespread in the early part of the decade, owing to the work of Lil Jon in particular, while the decade's second half saw the ascent of trap artists like T.I., Jeezy, and Gucci Mane. In Houston, the chopped and screwed style—originally pioneered by DJ Screw—enjoyed a period of national success around 2005, fueled by the Swishahouse label. As trap evolved in the 2010s, artists like Lex Luger helped spread trap-influenced production into other genres like pop, while rappers like Future adapted it into mumble rap. During this period, Southern rappers like Soulja Boy and the Raider Klan capitalized on the Internet to further their styles and careers.

In addition to its musical style, Southern hip-hop has been regarded as distinctive for local slang terms like "trill" and "bling-bling", which have been extensively used and popularized within the genre. Southern hip-hop music is also commonly associated with the wearing of grills, an emphasis on cars, and the consumption of the drug lean.

== Overall characteristics ==
Texas gangsta offered an entirely different view of the South than the party-charged Miami flavor. To some extent, the meeting of those two poles has defined the essence of Southern hip-hop.

— Roni Sarig, Third Coast: Outkast, Timbaland, and How Hip-hop Became a Southern Thing

Although Southern hip-hop includes a number of localized scenes with distinct styles, there are nevertheless stylistic commonalities that have been observed throughout the region. Most Southern hip-hop music places less emphasis on lyrical complexity than other regions do, instead prioritizing vocal styles that encourage audience participation, such as call-and-response chants or catchy choruses that can be sung along with. Southern rappers also assert connections to their home communities by foregrounding their accents and their regional slang. Thematically, music focused on partying and dancing has been viewed as characteristic of Southern hip-hop. At the same time, other branches of Southern hip-hop embraced gangsta rap and have been described by music journalists as pioneers of hardcore hip-hop.

Musically, Southern hip-hop displays inspiration from other Southern music styles, such as gospel and blues. Funk elements also appear frequently in Southern hip-hop production. Bass-heavy percussion, especially that produced by the Roland TR-808 drum machine, is viewed as a cornerstone of much Southern hip-hop. According to some performers, Southern hip-hop is also more likely than other regions to use live instrumentation rather than samples. (Note: DJ Jaycee of the Aphilliates: "This is what makes Organized Noize so key to Atlanta: ... they weren't really sampling. There was a lot of live instrumentation[.]"; Mannie Fresh: "For a long time hip-hop was just snippets and elements of other stuff. But when you get to the South it actually becomes music. You have more people playing it.")

== History ==
=== 1979–1992: Beginnings ===
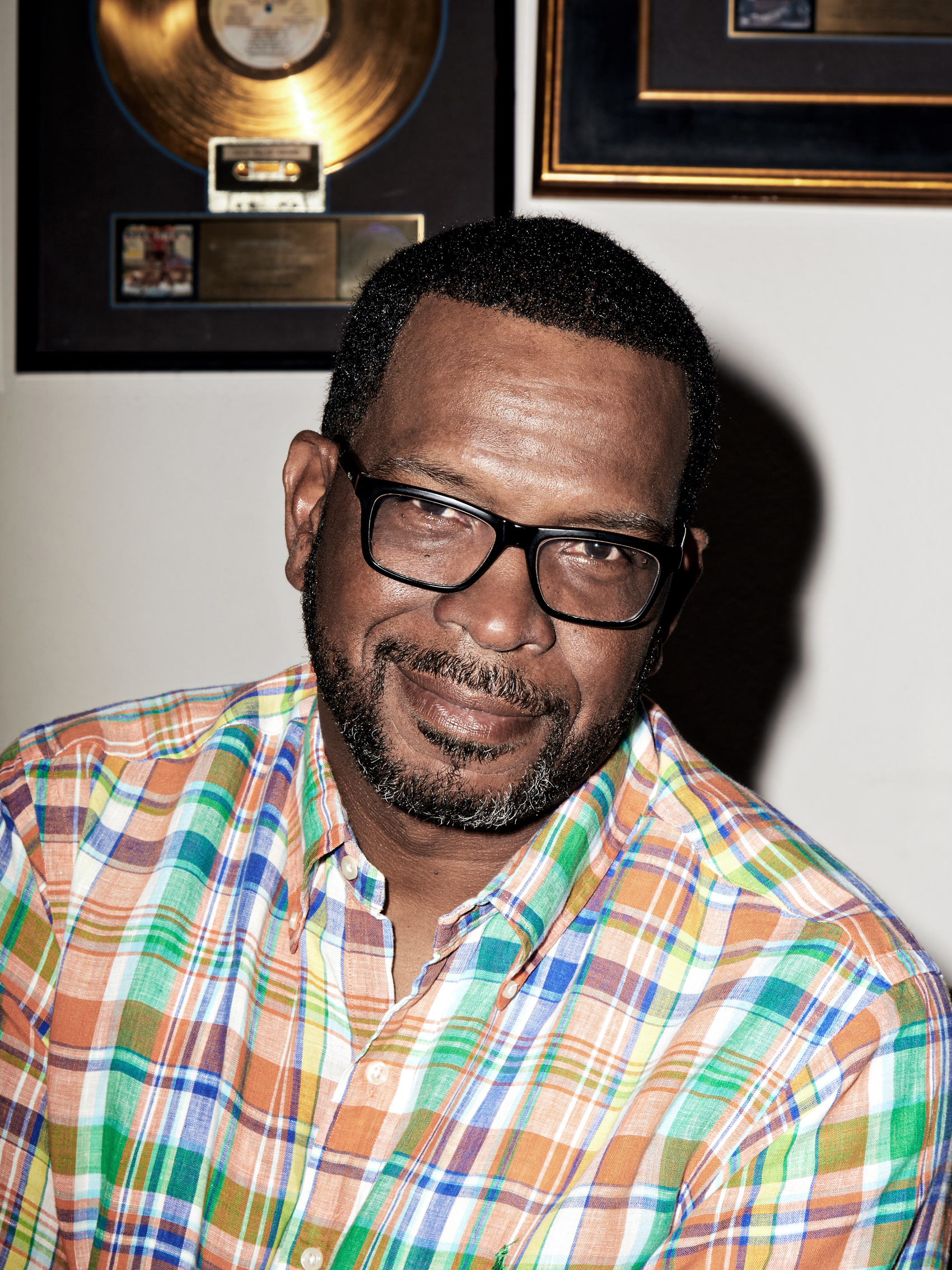
Miami's Luther Campbell (pictured in 2017), the frontman of 2 Live Crew in the late 1980s, was a formative influence on much of Southern hip-hop.

The first notable Southern act to release hip-hop music was the Sequence, a South Carolina–based group who signed to Sugar Hill Records. While attending a Sugarhill Gang concert, the Sequence encountered Sylvia Robinson and impressed her with their music. Sugar Hill subsequently published the Sequence's single "Funk You Up" in late 1979. However, rather than perform or record in South Carolina, the Sequence moved to New York City to participate in the more established hip-hop scene there. In the 1980s, hip-hop subcultures began to coalesce in several Southern cities, but early artists in these environments tended to affiliate themselves with city-level or neighborhood-level communities instead of claiming a pan-Southern identity. "Southern hip-hop" was not yet regarded as a distinct, coherent concept, nor was it taken seriously by New York rappers or the mainstream music industry, who tended to disparage noticeably Southern variants on hip-hop as unsophisticated or backward.

Miami was one of the first Southern cities to achieve wider popularity with its local hip-hop style. The city already hosted a number of independent record labels that focused on traditionally black music genres such as disco, which positioned it well to begin publishing rap. The genre of Miami bass emerged in the 1980s, deriving from electro and from the city's reggae-influenced DJing culture. MC A.D.E.'s 1985 single "Bass Rock Express", followed by 2 Live Crew's "Throw the D" in 1986, were foundational tracks in shaping Miami bass. The style also expanded beyond Miami itself, with early Atlanta hip-hop artists like Raheem the Dream displaying strong Miami bass influence in their music. Miami's early hip-hop community was heavily connected to the city's nightclub and strip club scenes, and the local style came to be defined by sexually charged lyrics. This reputation for vulgarity culminated when U.S. District Court Judge Jose Gonzalez ruled that 2 Live Crew's 1989 album As Nasty as They Wanna Be was obscene and illegal to sell. Gonzalez's ruling led to a legal battle, which concluded when the U.S. Court of Appeals for the Eleventh Circuit overturned the obscenity finding. As a result of their victory in the obscenity case, followed by another victory in Campbell v. Acuff-Rose Music, Inc. two years later, 2 Live Crew and its leader Luther Campbell have been credited as "First Amendment champion[s]" who "made it safe for hip-hop as we know it to exist". Writers like Ben Westhoff and Jesse Serwer have identified Campbell as a formative influence on the musical styles, bawdy themes, and independent distribution practices popular throughout later Southern hip-hop.

Houston is another city to have built a flourishing local hip-hop community in the late 1980s. One of the most pivotal moments in the growth of Houston's hip-hop scene was the establishment of Rap-A-Lot Records, which was founded by James Prince and Cliff Blodget in approximately 1986. (Note: Different sources date its origin to 1985, 1986, or 1987.) Prince assembled the Geto Boys as the label's flagship group. The Geto Boys became increasingly successful over the late 1980s, leading Def American Records to sign them and release the 1990 remix album The Geto Boys to national audiences. The album's offensive lyrical content caused the business relationship between Def American and Rap-A-Lot to collapse; however, Prince secured another national distribution deal for the following Geto Boys album, 1991's We Can't Be Stopped, which became the group's breakthrough project and increased the prominence of Houston's broader hip-hop scene. Matt Miller of Emory University has argued that the Geto Boys' success during this era was partially a product of their ability to replicate the styles of New York and Los Angeles hip-hop:

The only thing "southern" about the Geto Boys was their origin, which, in keeping with the moment, was perceived as an anomaly rather than a central feature of their ability to produce credible rap music for national audiences.

Early hip-hop communities also arose in other Southern cities during the 1980s and early 1990s. Memphis and New Orleans are two examples of cities whose hip-hop styles began to take shape at the start of the 1990s. Both cities were influenced by the 1986 Showboys single "Drag Rap"; artists isolated a drum loop from the song, dubbing the resulting loop the "Triggerman beat". In Memphis, DJ Spanish Fly popularized "Triggerman" as a complement for a burgeoning local dance trend called the Gangsta Walk, in which participants would march in concentric circles around the dance floor. From there, the Triggerman beat spread to New Orleans, where it was combined with Cameron Paul's "Brown Beats" to become a core building block of bounce music's sound. "Where Dey At", a 1991 live recording by DJ Irv Phillips and MC T. Tucker, became one of the first bounce tracks to achieve popularity; the following year, a studio version of the same song was recorded by DJ Jimi, further raising bounce's profile.

=== 1992–2000: Mainstream breakthrough of the "Dirty South" ===
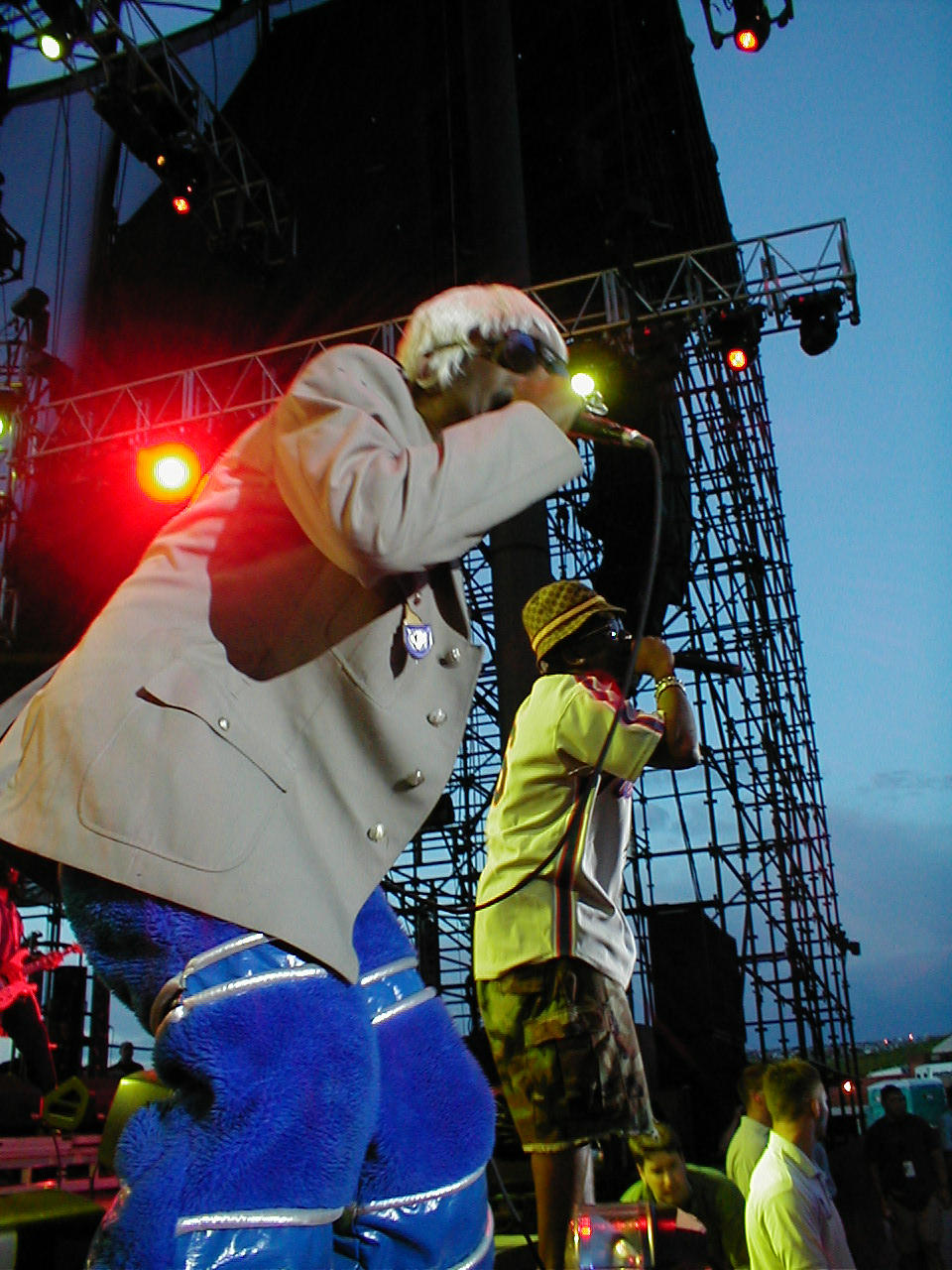
Atlanta-based duo Outkast (pictured in 2001) became one of the most prominent Southern hip-hop acts of the 1990s.

In the 1990s, Atlanta grew to become one of the primary centers of Southern hip-hop. Producer Jermaine Dupri was one of the first to achieve mainstream commercial success with Atlanta-based hip-hop, launching the careers of teenage rap duo Kris Kross and parlaying their success into a label called So So Def Recordings. While Kris Kross' music deliberately limited its use of regional signifiers, they nevertheless served as a proof of concept that successful hip-hop could come from Atlanta. LaFace Records, which was established in Atlanta in 1989 and initially focused on publishing R&B music, thus turned its attention to hip-hop as well. LaFace connected with Rico Wade of the Organized Noize production team, which also put the label in contact with Wade's fellow Dungeon Family acts, Outkast and Goodie Mob. Outkast pursued a style with a distinctively Southern aesthetic, incorporating live instrumentation inspired by genres such as funk, soul, and gospel; other hip-hop subgenres like G-funk had built upon similar reference points, but Outkast diverged from them by adopting an "earthy, down-home, celebratory vibe" instead of G-funk's aggressive posture. On the back of their 1994 debut album, Southernplayalisticadillacmuzik, Outkast was awarded Best New Rap Group at the 1995 Source Awards. The New York–based crowd booed Outkast upon their receipt of the award, leading group member André 3000 to make the following remarks in his acceptance speech:

I'm tired of folks, you know what I'm saying? Close-minded folks. It's like we got a demo tape and nobody want to hear it. But it's like this—the South got something to say. That's all I got to say.

André 3000's words have come to be regarded as a rallying cry for Southern hip-hop, inspiring its artists to view themselves as a unified front willing to stand up to Northern disapproval. In particular, musicians and writers have identified his word choice—stating that "the South got something to say" instead of highlighting a more localized region—as a significant step toward fostering a pan-Southern hip-hop community. The year 1995 also saw Goodie Mob release their debut album Soul Food, which popularized the term "Dirty South" through a song by the same name. While the term "Dirty South" had been in occasional use previously, primarily using "dirty" to refer to sex or criminality, Goodie Mob reframed it as a criticism of the region's history of racism and governmental corruption. After this usage rose to popularity, the "Dirty South" concept began to be widely embraced, both by Southern artists seeking to establish their legitimacy or regional affiliations and by external commentators seeking to characterize the region's sound. As the "Dirty South" label entered wider use, its meaning became less focused; some artists and commentators returned to using the phrase "Dirty South" to describe sexual or party-focused music, while others used it metonymously to refer to broader cultural tropes like Southern hospitality. Nevertheless, the term has remained in common use to signify an artist's authentic Southern identity.

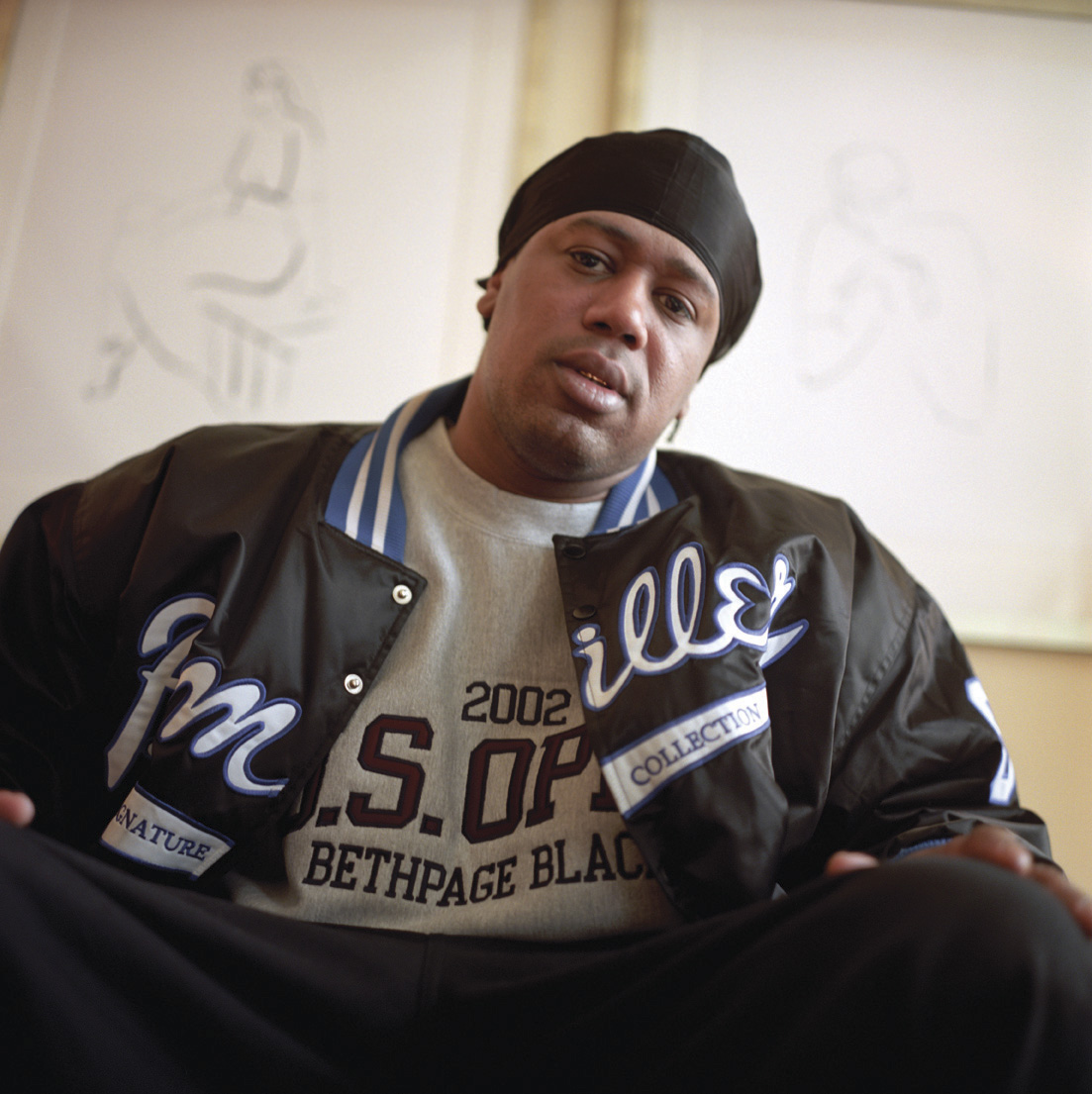
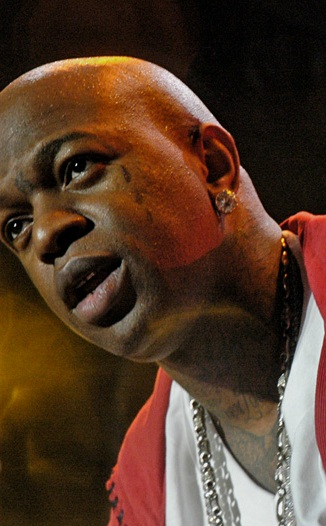
In New Orleans, Master P (left) founded No Limit Records, while Bryan "Baby" Williams (right) co-founded Cash Money Records; both labels were highly successful in the late 1990s.

In addition to Atlanta, New Orleans became one of hip-hop's most commercially dominant cities over the course of the 1990s. Early in the decade, the growing bounce music scene dominated New Orleans hip-hop. Cash Money Records was founded in 1991 by brothers Ronald and Bryan Williams, (Note: Some sources date its foundation to 1992, but the 1991 date is more common.) first focusing on bounce and then expanding to sign artists like Juvenile who could pair bounce with gangsta rap. Meanwhile, the New Orleans–raised Master P had become interested in the music business after running a record store in California; he founded the label No Limit Records, and after some early West Coast releases, he returned to New Orleans to begin marketing artists from his hometown. Both labels attained success in the early 1990s, albeit only on a local level; however, when New Orleans rapper Mystikal signed to Jive Records and released 1995's Mind of Mystikal, the city's hip-hop scene was abruptly placed into the spotlight. Mystikal's own music did not embrace bounce at all, which some writers argue was the reason he managed to attain national success, but his prominence nevertheless drew the attention of the wider music industry to New Orleans. In 1996, No Limit Records signed a distribution deal with Priority Records in which No Limit retained the rights to all of their master recordings. Master P capitalized on this lucrative deal by releasing No Limit albums as frequently as possible; more than fifty albums were released through No Limit in the later 1990s, and the label's collective discography sold over 75 million records. Seeing the profit that No Limit and Priority had attained through their collaboration, Universal Music Group struck a similar deal with Cash Money Records in 1998. Juvenile's 1998 album 400 Degreez, released under the Universal deal, became another explosive commercial success to emerge from New Orleans; the album featured a number of bounce-influenced songs, including its lead single "Ha", that helped bring the sound to wider attention. Cash Money's success was also bolstered by the work of in-house producer Mannie Fresh, who produced the large majority of Cash Money's 1990s releases and has been credited with shaping the "apocalyptic electro-funk" of their sound.

Within Houston, the 1990s were a formative period that defined the city's local sound. Early in the decade, DJ Screw pioneered the chopped and screwed production style, which involved slowing records down and repeating significant passages to achieve a psychedelic effect. Screw released a series of mixtapes—the "Screw tapes"—that included chopped and screwed versions of popular rap songs, as well as novel tracks featuring performances from local rappers. His regular collaborators—including Big Moe, Fat Pat, Lil' Keke, E.S.G., and numerous others—came to be known as the Screwed Up Click, and Houston rappers began to regard appearances on a Screw tape as the best way to promote their music. Screw's cavalier use of other artists' copyrighted material prevented him from attracting much attention from major labels, (Note: A small number of exceptions to this general pattern existed—most notably 3 'n the Mornin' and its sequel, which were released by local label Big Tyme Records and distributed by Priority.) but he sold his tapes in large quantities himself, first directly from his home and then from a store called Screwed Up Records and Tapes. By prioritizing direct sales and cutting out middlemen in this way, Screw and other Houston artists were able to support their music careers without needing to break through in the national music industry or radio ecosystem. The codeine-based drug cocktail lean also became popular in Houston during the 1990s; DJ Screw died in 2000 after overdosing on lean, but his hip-hop style continued to be influential in Houston beyond his death.

As a testament to the growing national profile of Southern hip-hop, rappers from the coasts began to collaborate with Southern acts during the later 1990s. New York's Jay-Z recorded a remix to Juvenile's "Ha", and followed the remix by offering Juvenile a guest appearance on his next album in 1999. On the same album, Jay-Z featured the Houston-based duo UGK on the single "Big Pimpin'". UGK had been rising in popularity and acclaim throughout the South over the course of the 1990s, and crossover hits like "Big Pimpin'" helped introduce a wider audience to Texan accents and slang. The collaboration also benefited Jay-Z, who could use it to demonstrate his awareness of burgeoning trends in the genre. Meanwhile, California's Snoop Dogg signed to No Limit Records in 1998 and released his album Da Game Is to Be Sold, Not to Be Told through the label. Another sign of the South's growing esteem came when Island Def Jam founded the imprint Def Jam South around the turn of the millennium; the label's first notable signee was Ludacris, who went on to attain commercial success with his laid-back, comedic style.

=== 2000–2007: The spread of subgenres and the mixtape era ===
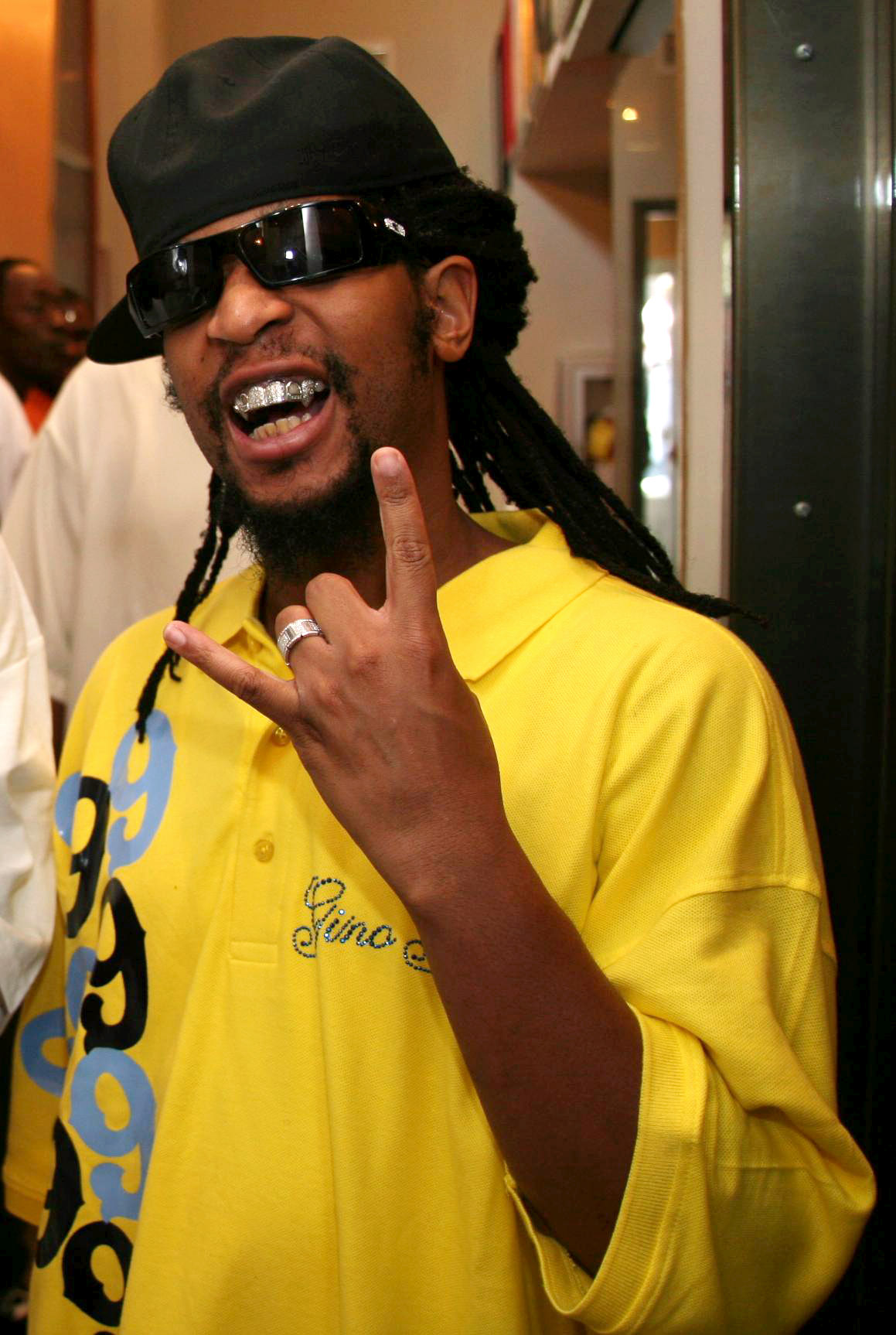
Atlanta's Lil Jon (pictured in 2007) brought national attention to crunk, the first of several Southern hip-hop subgenres to achieve mainstream success in the 2000s.

Despite its explosive success in the late 1990s, many of No Limit and Cash Money's leading artists left the labels in the early 2000s, causing both—and New Orleans hip-hop more generally—to recede from the public eye. In its place, a new hip-hop subgenre called crunk was on the rise. Featuring call-and-response vocals shouted over instrumentals centered on bass and drum machines, the crunk style originated from the Memphis-based group Three 6 Mafia but took hold most strongly in Atlanta. Lil Jon, an Atlanta-based DJ and producer, was the foremost figure in popularizing crunk music. After the release of his debut album in 1997, Lil Jon's stature grew over the ensuing years, culminating when his 2003 single "Get Low" catapulted crunk to national attention. Crunk's emphasis on raw emotion above technical sophistication, along with its frequently confrontational or violent subject matter, led it to be polarizing among critics; detractors branded it as unskilled or hateful, while more favorably aligned commentators argued that it provided a constructive, communal outlet for expressing anger. Snap music, another Atlanta-based genre, emerged soon after the height of crunk's fame. Named for its frequent use of finger snaps as percussion and popularized by artists such as Dem Franchize Boyz and D4L, snap was a minimalistic style viewed as a less aggressive alternative to crunk. Snap achieved some chart success in 2005 and 2006, but proved to be a short-lived trend.

In addition to crunk and snap, Atlanta would also popularize the genre of trap music in the 2000s. The core concepts and themes of trap were articulated in Atlanta hip-hop throughout the 1990s, but the album that is viewed as having crystallized the genre is T.I.'s Trap Muzik in 2003. The title was not intended to provide the name to a subgenre; rather, it aimed to communicate that the album's content was about life in the "trap", an Atlanta slang term for a drug house. However, Trap Muzik proved to be explosively successful—achieving platinum certification and multiple popular singles—and so its sound, characterized by extensive hi-hat fills and heavy bass, came to be defined as "trap" as well. Producers who were instrumental in shaping the early trap sound include DJ Toomp, Shawty Redd, and Zaytoven. Alongside T.I., music writers have cited Jeezy and Gucci Mane as the foremost trap rappers of the 2000s. Jeezy achieved platinum status with his 2005 debut album Let's Get It: Thug Motivation 101, putting him at the forefront of late-2000s Southern hip-hop, whereas Gucci Mane put out a flurry of underground albums before achieving his commercial breakthrough with 2009's The State vs. Radric Davis. Memphis also produced some significant trap rappers, including Yo Gotti, Moneybagg Yo, and Young Dolph. While trap is thematically closely aligned with gangsta rap, music writers have argued that it takes a different philosophical approach to the subject matter, with trap artists taking more efforts to defend drug dealing as a necessary evil for those trying to survive in impoverished urban areas.

Meanwhile, Houston hip-hop also attained its greatest mainstream breakthrough in the mid-2000s. The key figure behind its expansion was Michael "5000" Watts, a DJ who headed the record label Swishahouse. Watts also produced chopped and screwed music, which led him and DJ Screw to be rivals during the latter's lifetime, but after Screw's death Watts became the style's leading ambassador. The Swishahouse movement first ascended into the mainstream with the release of Mike Jones' 2004 single "Still Tippin'", distributed nationally thanks to a deal between Swishahouse and the Warner Bros. imprint Asylum Records. "Still Tippin'" popularized a number of characteristic elements of Houston rap, including screwed vocals, laid-back deliveries, and aesthetic signifiers such as lean usage and decorated cars. The song featured Slim Thug and Paul Wall, former Swishahouse signees who also became national stars during this period. Wall's major-label debut, 2005's The Peoples Champ, became an explosive commercial hit that further popularized screwed, car-themed music; his former collaborator Chamillionaire, meanwhile, released the hit single "Ridin'" that launched his own solo debut to platinum status.

Another phenomenon to occur in Southern hip-hop in this decade was an evolution of the role of mixtapes. Mixtapes have been widely used by hip-hop artists, both within and beyond the South, since the genre's early days; Southern cities that attracted particular attention for their early mixtape scenes include Houston and Memphis. Early hip-hop mixtapes were either compilations assembled by DJs or self-released projects by independent rappers who did not yet have record deals. However, in the 2000s, established rappers began using mixtapes to maintain a buzz between albums and to release material in a more casual, unrestrained fashion. This new category of mixtape was typically released for free and often featured artists rapping over the beats to other musicians' existing hits. The practice first emerged in the Northeast, but was brought to the South when Philadelphia-raised DJ Drama enrolled in Clark Atlanta University. DJ Drama began releasing a series of mixtapes titled Gangsta Grillz, which were originally niche but exploded in popularity after Drama began releasing collaborative mixtapes alongside then–rising star T.I. Other trap rappers like Jeezy and Gucci Mane followed suit and began using mixtapes to similar effect. The Southern rapper who achieved the most acclaim for his 2000s mixtapes, however, was New Orleans' Lil Wayne. While working on his album Tha Carter III, Wayne became frustrated by leaks and bootlegging of his material, and decided to outflank the bootleggers by releasing free mixtapes to the public himself. Several of these tapes became critical successes in their own right, including 2006's Dedication 2 and 2007's Da Drought 3, and the series of mixtapes is credited with forging Wayne's reputation for lyrical skill. Though mixtapes in this era commonly flouted copyright law, the music industry often tolerated their existence as promotional tools. However, an RIAA-backed attempt to crack down on illegal mixtapes resulted in a police raid of DJ Drama's studio in 2007, in which Drama and his collaborator Don Cannon were charged under the RICO Act.

The continued penetration of Southern hip-hop into the mainstream could also be seen in the increasing number of honors being awarded to Southern hip-hop acts. Outkast's 2003 album Speakerboxxx/The Love Below won several categories, including Album of the Year, at the 46th Annual Grammy Awards. Meanwhile, the 2005 film Hustle & Flow brought widespread attention to Memphis hip-hop acts—especially Three 6 Mafia, whose track "It's Hard Out Here for a Pimp" won an Academy Award for Best Original Song.

=== 2007–2019: Internet era and trap's ascendancy ===
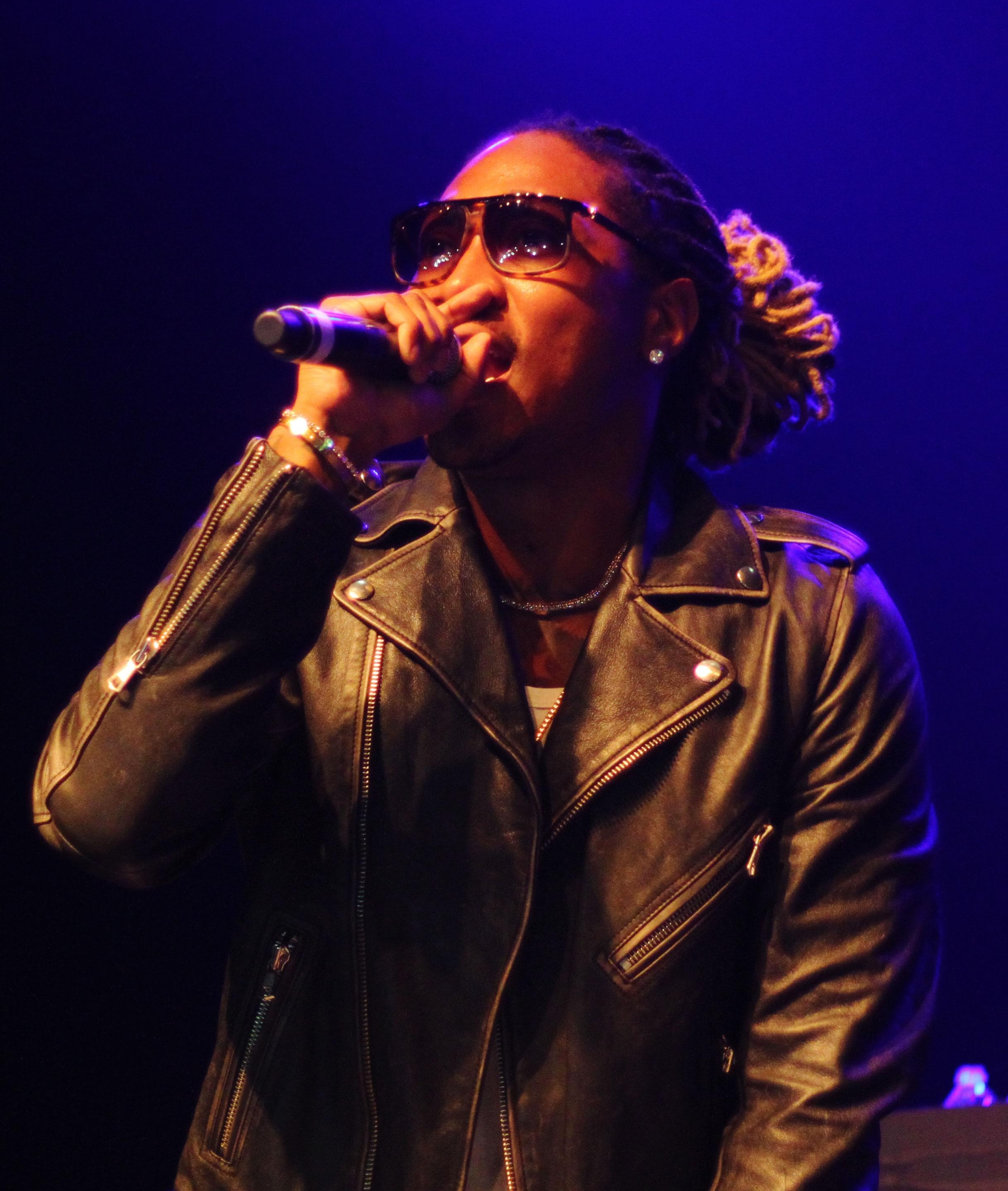
Atlanta rapper Future (pictured in 2014) played an important role in the evolution of trap and mumble rap in the 2010s.

As the twenty-first century progressed, the Internet became increasingly prominent, bringing new hip-hop distribution methods with it. For instance, after DJ Drama's 2007 arrest, many artists altered their mixtape release practices to prioritize online publication on sites like DatPiff. At several points, Southern acts led the charge toward moving hip-hop onto the Internet. Atlanta rapper Soulja Boy was a pioneer of online self-promotion, building a large fanbase on MySpace and uploading his own music videos to YouTube. These practices turned his 2007 single "Crank That" into an explosive viral hit, resulting in Soulja Boy securing a record deal with the Interscope imprint Collipark Records. In the 2010s, the website SoundCloud also emerged as a major distribution platform for independent hip-hop artists. One of the first rap acts to achieve acclaim through SoundCloud was the Miami-area collective Raider Klan, headed by SpaceGhostPurrp. Raider Klan produced ominous music inspired by Memphis groups like Three 6 Mafia; their subgenre came to be known as phonk, a term coined by SpaceGhostPurrp in song titles like "Pheel tha Phonk 1990". While Raider Klan declined in the mid-2010s, owing to the departure of prominent members like Denzel Curry and Lil Ugly Mane, the Miami region remained a hub of SoundCloud rap as a new generation of local rappers adopted the platform. Miami's second wave of SoundCloud rap was characterized by a raw, unpolished sound and distorted bass; XXXTentacion was one of the movement's most successful acts, while other important participants included Smokepurpp, Ski Mask the Slump God, Lil Pump, and Wifisfuneral.

As the 2000s gave way to the 2010s, Atlanta's trap scene began to evolve into new styles and reach new heights of commercial prominence. The producer Lex Luger was one of the primary artists who catalyzed this shift; his production for Waka Flocka Flame's hits around 2010 featured a "grandiose" sound that pushed the subgenre's characteristic hi-hat fills to greater extremes than before. The success of these songs, particularly "Hard in da Paint", made Luger a highly sought-after producer and caused trap-inspired production to spread throughout hip-hop and into EDM and pop. Established trap producer Zaytoven also remained near the heart of the trap scene throughout this period; his support helped the trio Migos rise to prominence in 2013, and the group's extensive use of triplet flows popularized that delivery throughout trap. A new vocal delivery that would prove to become even more impactful, however, was the melodic, Auto-Tuned rapping popularized by Future. Tallahassee singer T-Pain had previously risen to prominence with a heavily Auto-Tuned sound in the 2000s, but Future took a novel approach to the tool, using it to adapt his vocals into impressionistic, melancholy psychedelia. Future's rise to success also boosted the careers of the producers with whom he collaborated, such as Metro Boomin and Sonny Digital.

Future's melodic, indistinctly enunciated, drug-focused style of rapping has also caused him to be regarded as a progenitor of mumble rap; he first brought together many of the style's characteristics in his 2011 single, "Tony Montana". Another important pioneer of mumble rap is Young Thug, whose rapping spans a kaleidoscopic range of vocalizations, including wails, moans, warbles, and more. Closely derived from trap, mumble rap is a style characterized by woozy, unclear rapping and singing over densely layered production. The term "mumble rap" itself emerged as a pejorative; it was first coined by Wiz Khalifa, who used the term in 2016 to criticize Future and Young Thug, and was popularized later that year when New York producer Pete Rock used it to disparage Lil Yachty. Despite this criticism from acclaimed Northern hip-hop figures, numerous mumble rap artists emerged in the South in the later 2010s. In particular, Atlanta—home to both Future and Young Thug, as well as other prominent mumble rappers like Rich Homie Quan, 21 Savage, and Gunna—has been described by theorist Heidi Lewis as "the mumble rap capital of the world". Outside of Atlanta, Houston's Travis Scott has attracted attention for the elaborate processing he employs on his vocals; artists associated with mumble rap have also emerged from states such as Florida (Kodak Black), Mississippi (Rae Sremmurd), and Louisiana (YoungBoy Never Broke Again).

During the late 2000s and the 2010s, the South moved into an increasingly central place in the hip-hop world. By 2009, Jon Caramanica was characterizing Atlanta as "hip-hop's center of gravity"; other writers have made similar claims since then, arguing for either the South in general or Atlanta specifically as being the most essential region to 21st-century hip-hop. However, this growing ubiquity also engendered increasing amounts of backlash from other wings of the hip-hop community. Soulja Boy's music was publicly derided by older generations of rappers from both coasts, and in 2009, Jay-Z released the single "D.O.A. (Death of Auto-Tune)" to rail against the Auto-Tuned style that artists like T-Pain and Lil Wayne were employing. With the rise of mumble rap in the 2010s, this public criticism reached a fever pitch, with widespread mockery being aimed at both the creators and the fans of the subgenre.

=== 2020–present: Blurring of regional boundaries ===
As the Internet era progressed, hip-hop subgenres have become less tied to particular geographic locations. For instance, although mumble rap was primarily practiced by Southern artists, commentators have also named Lil Uzi Vert—a Philadelphia native—as one of its notable performers. Similarly, while some writers placed XXXTentacion primarily in conversation with his fellow artists in the Miami SoundCloud scene, others aligned him more with non-Southern emo rappers like Lil Peep and Juice WRLD. (Note: Juice WRLD was from Chicago, while Lil Peep was raised on Long Island and began his career in Los Angeles.) The distinction between Southern and non-Southern rap subgenres continued to blur with the rise of rage in the early 2020s. Atlanta rapper Playboi Carti was a pivotal figure who led the transition from mumble rap to rage, and his record label Opium has signed other Atlanta rage artists like Ken Carson and Destroy Lonely, but Oregon's Yeat has been called the subgenre's biggest star. Meanwhile, phonk traveled outside of the United States entirely; beginning around 2020, a wave of Russian producers adapted it into a more house-influenced style known as drift phonk.

== Regional styles ==
=== Atlanta ===
Atlanta is everything. Atlanta has been snap music. It's been artsy music. It's been crunk music. There's been gangster music, then trap music. That's why they been winning for so long.

— Zaytoven

Atlanta has one of the South's largest and most frequently evolving hip-hop scenes. Mojo's "Let Mojo Handle It" is said to have been the first Atlanta rap song to be recorded and released; however, Atlanta's first rapper to achieve any noteworthy level of success was the Bronx-to-Atlanta transplant MC Shy D. Shy D signed to the Miami record label 4-Sight and began to release Miami bass–influenced singles, beginning with 1985's "Rapp Will Never Die". As a result, Atlanta's hip-hop style in the later 1980s was heavily derived from the Miami sound. Prominent artists from Atlanta's bass era include Kilo Ali and Raheem the Dream. Another early step in Atlanta hip-hop was the slick, poppy style pioneered by Jermaine Dupri and Dallas Austin in the early 1990s. These producers launched rappers, such as teenage duo Kris Kross, who were commercially successful but deliberately downplayed their Southernness. Another development came in 1992, with the release of Arrested Development's debut album, 3 Years, 5 Months and 2 Days in the Life Of...; this project aimed to craft an aesthetically Southern variant of the Afrocentric rap of New York's Native Tongues movement. The album proved to be a critical and commercial success, and it was one of the first hip-hop albums to specifically articulate a Southern identity, but its direct influence was limited due to Arrested Development's disconnect from Atlanta's broader culture and music scene.

Atlanta's disparate early scenes first crystallized into a prominent, influential local style with the emergence of the Dungeon Family—a collective including Outkast, Goodie Mob, and the Organized Noize production team. Organized Noize crafted a sound that deliberately sought to combine East Coast, West Coast, and Southern elements, and that drew on genres such as gospel, rock and roll, blues, and soul. Their beats also featured layers of live instrumentation playing novel compositions, rather than centering samples or interpolations. Upon this backdrop, Outkast's lyrics took a grounded street-rap approach that conveyed the experience of being black in Atlanta, while Goodie Mob adopted an angrier and more political approach informed by conscious hip-hop. Outkast grew to be an immense critical and commercial success: author Jonathan Abrams regards them as "arguably the South's most influential hip-hop group", while author Roni Sarig describes them as the Beatles of hip-hop. Goodie Mob also made a regional impact with their 1995 debut Soul Food, but other Dungeon Family–affiliated acts like Witchdoctor and Lil' Will struggled to break out. Even so, the level of acclaim achieved by the Dungeon Family's flagship groups lent 1990s Atlanta a reputation for "soul-minded hip-hop eccentrics".

Although overshadowed by the Dungeon Family's artistic movement, Miami-inspired bass music continued to be produced in Atlanta throughout the 1990s. Many of Atlanta bass' major tracks were highlighted on So So Def Bass All-Stars, a 1996 compilation album assembled by Lil Jon (at the time an A&R representative for So So Def Records). Lil Jon then combined the salacious, danceable aspects of bass music with the dark aesthetics and aggressive chanting of Memphis groups like Three 6 Mafia, a synthesis which solidified and popularized the genre of crunk. Crunk beats are characterized by a bass-heavy sound typically generated by drum machines; they commonly use tempos around 75 beats per minute, over which double-time hi-hats and drum fills can be overlaid to give the song a fast, frenetic feel. Crunk vocals predominantly consist of shouted, call-and-response hooks intended to provoke rowdiness in listeners; the subject matter of crunk songs typically centers upon sex, partying, and violent confrontations. During the height of crunk in the early 2000s, Lil Jon was the genre's primary exponent; other significant crunk acts included the Ying Yang Twins, as well as Bone Crusher and Pastor Troy. By the mid-2000s, crunk was on the decline, and some further short-lived genres spun off of it. One such genre was intimate club music, a minimalistic style characterized by whispered vocals; another was snap, which shared crunk's chanted vocals and sexual themes while adopting a more restrained sound typically built upon finger snapping.

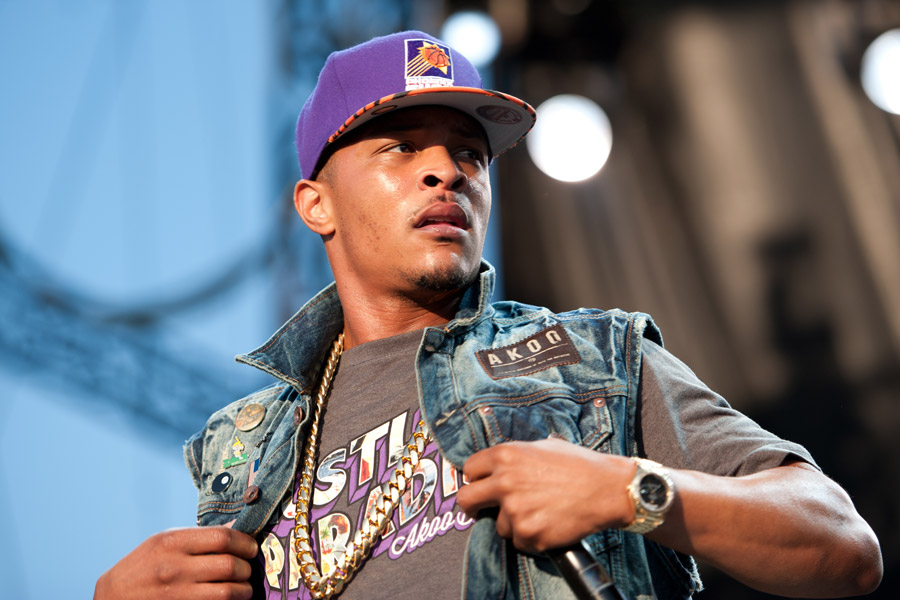
T.I. (pictured in 2012) was one of the primary artists who defined and solidified trap music in the 2000s.

The 2000s also saw Atlanta develop its most influential hip-hop subgenre: trap. The core sonic elements of trap are defined as high-speed bursts of hi-hats and heavy, exaggerated bass kicks, most typically produced via the TR-808 drum machine. Dark moods and synthesizer melodies are also characteristic of trap production. Lyrically, trap tends to focus on life in the drug trade, with an attitude that is occasionally boastful but more often gritty and candid. While earlier Atlanta acts like Kilo Ali and Goodie Mob explored topics that were thematically similar to trap, the genre received its name and crystallized its style with the 2003 album Trap Muzik, performed by T.I. and produced by DJ Toomp. T.I. thus became one of the 2000s' leading trap artists. Trap's other leading figures in this era included Jeezy and Gucci Mane; Jeezy's sound was shaped by regular collaborations with the producer Shawty Redd, and Gucci worked similarly closely with Zaytoven. This generation of trap producers was a major influence upon Lex Luger, who created a lavish sound that pushed the genre's hi-hat fills even farther than before; Lex Luger's hits for Waka Flocka Flame, most famously 2010's "Hard in da Paint", brought a new level of attention to trap and caused its production styles to explode in popularity.

Trap vocal styles evolved heavily in the 2010s, a phenomenon spearheaded by Future and pioneered by his 2011 single "Tony Montana", which centered blearily delivered, melodic vocals and heavy usage of Auto-Tune. Future also popularized a thematic focus on melancholy, emotionally hollow hedonism defined by sex and drug usage. In this framework, he—alongside fellow 2010s Atlanta rap star Young Thug—adopted an approach in which vocals, rather than being a vehicle for lyrics, became primarily useful as pure sound and a way to communicate one's emotional state. Future's style came to shape the controversial subgenre of mumble rap, which—while geographically widespread—was primarily centered on Atlanta artists. The term "mumble rap" is loosely defined, often being used to indicate little more than a perceived lack of vocal clarity. However, the subgenre features some consistent traits, such as a thematic focus on accounts of the performer's mental and emotional condition, as well as on drug use and addiction. The production of mumble rap is generally characterized by a richly textured soundscape of numerous instrumental layers.

=== Houston ===
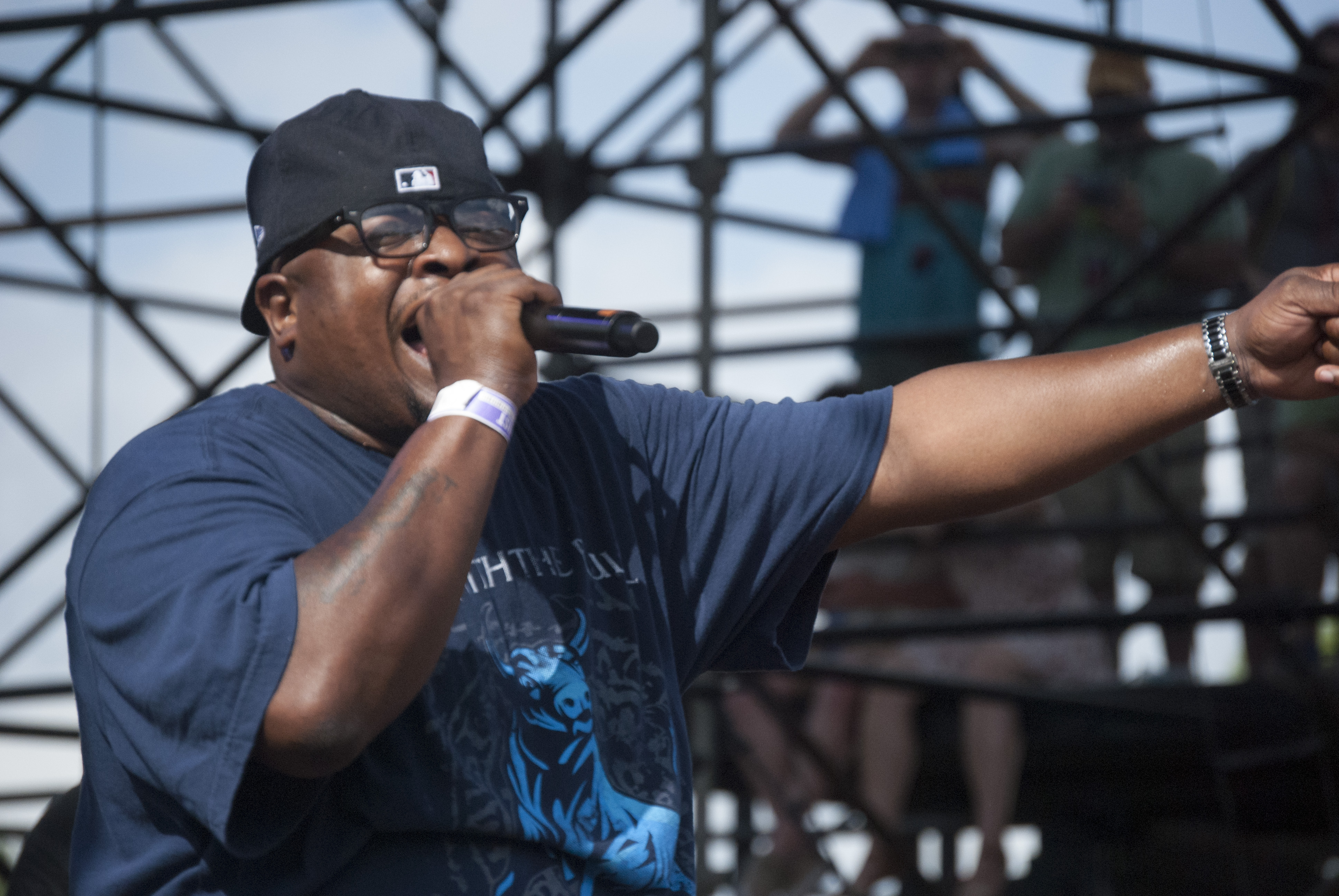
Scarface of the Geto Boys, pictured in 2013. The Geto Boys were Houston's first hip-hop act to attain nationwide attention.

The earliest significant hip-hop to emerge from Houston was closely affiliated with gangsta rap and hardcore hip-hop. Some early Houston rappers, such as K-Rino, released New York–style hip-hop in the mid-1980s, but the first Houston hip-hop act to achieve attention beyond the local region was the Geto Boys. The Geto Boys took many cues from the extant coastal rap scenes; while they gradually began to sample more Southern material over the course of their career, their style has not been retrospectively viewed as strongly affiliated with Houston. Nevertheless, the success of the Geto Boys (and of their label, Rap-A-Lot Records) established Houston as a regional rap hub. This drew in the duo UGK, who originated from Port Arthur and further refined the style of Houston's hardcore hip-hop. UGK's music featured heavier Southern accents and more extensive use of Texas slang, and their beats were lush and slow-paced, drawing inspirations from blues and funk. The early 1990s also saw Tony Draper found Suave House Records in Houston and begin recruiting rappers from around the South to his label, most prominently the Memphis duo 8Ball & MJG. Houston hip-hop's early hardcore period also involved the origins of horrorcore, which was pioneered by Ganksta N-I-P. The Geto Boys were another act that embraced this subgenre—especially group member Bushwick Bill, for whom N-I-P ghostwrote the horrorcore song "Chuckie".

In the 1990s, DJ Screw pioneered the chopped and screwed production style, which has come to be one of the most defining elements of Houston hip-hop's aesthetic. His characteristic sound was defined by slowing down tracks to a psychedelic, bass-heavy crawl, over which snippets of vocals could be slowed down or looped in a process called "chopping". Screw also invited a number of local rappers from Houston's South Side to rap over his instrumentals, resulting in the formation of the Screwed Up Click. Screw became hugely successful for his distinctive mixtapes, leading many other local DJs to imitate his style; the most prominent of these was the North Side's Michael "5000" Watts. The North and South Sides were longtime rivals within Houston's hip-hop scene, and accordingly Watts and Screw were often at odds during the latter's lifetime, but relations between the two DJs' camps stabilized after Screw's death in 2000. With the tension quashed, Watts' record label, Swishahouse, became an important proving ground for the up-and-coming crop of 2000s Houston rappers. Acts like Slim Thug, Mike Jones, Paul Wall, and Chamillionaire came up through Swishahouse before attaining their national breakthroughs and popularizing screwed music with the wider public.

=== New Orleans ===
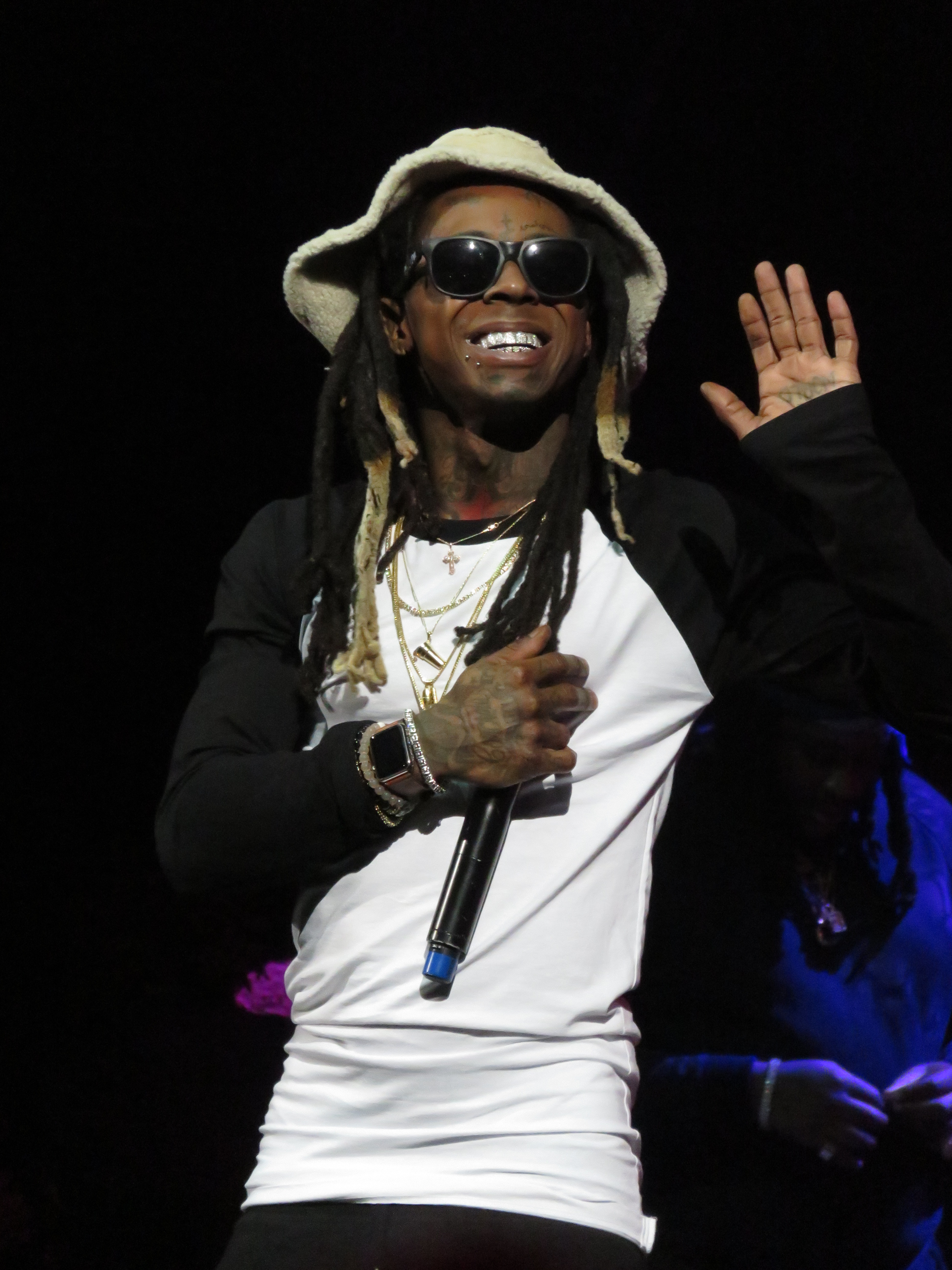
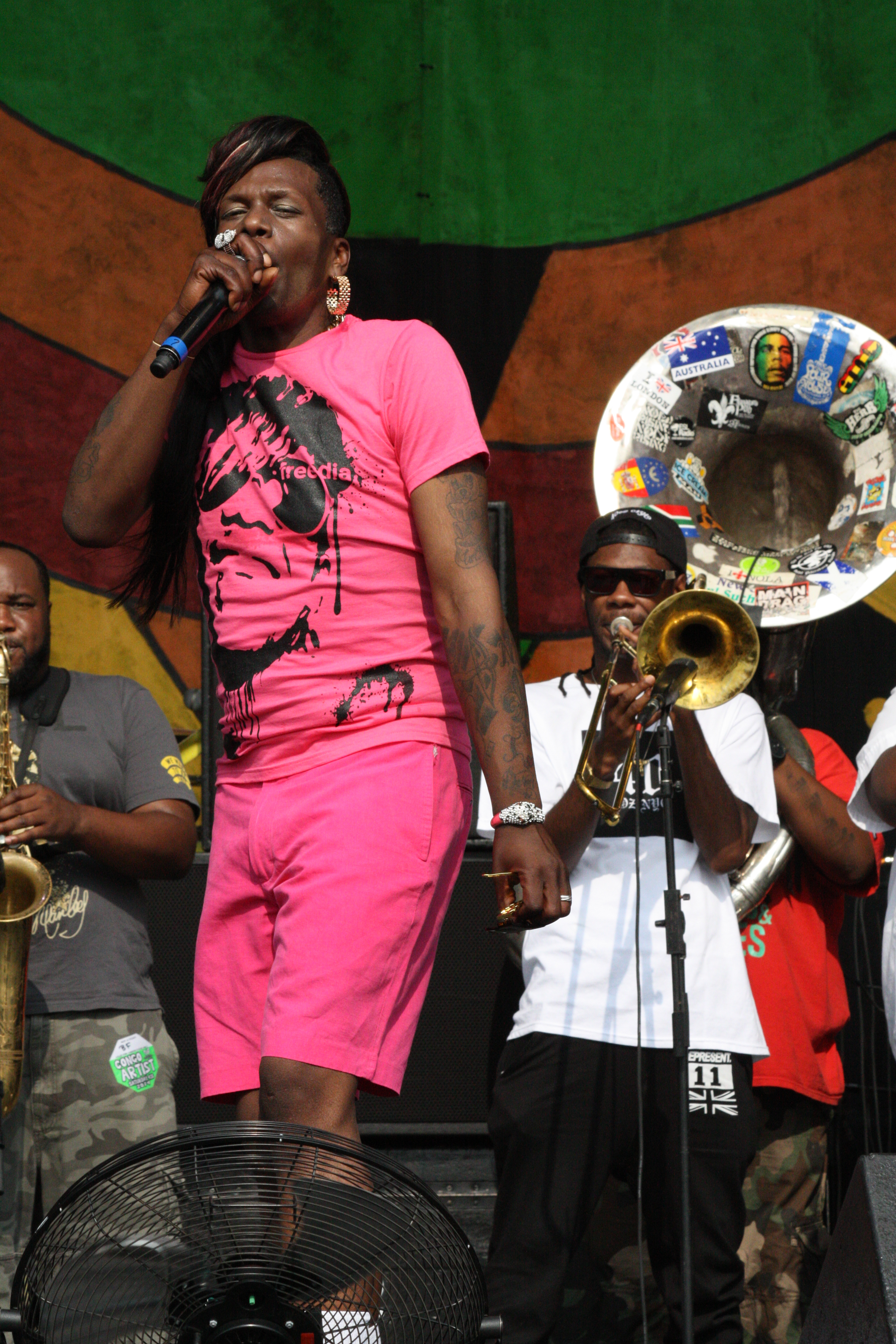
Lil Wayne (left) and Big Freedia (right) are two of New Orleans' most significant hip-hop artists of the twenty-first century.

New Orleans' hip-hop scene is well known for its local subgenre, bounce. Early bounce was characterized by production that sampled the "Triggerman beat", in conjunction with Cameron Paul's "Brown Beats". Bounce also typically sampled brass band music, inspired by New Orleans' second line tradition; the first known song to incorporate this trait was "Let's Jump", by MC J Ro J. New Orleans produced a handful of significant tracks prior to the crystallization of bounce's sound, most prominently 1989's "Buck Jump Time" by Mannie Fresh and Gregory D, which also introduced the bounce trend of lyrics that extensively referenced local housing projects. (Note: Mannie Fresh's pre-bounce career also involved a stint DJing for New York Incorporated, New Orleans' first notable hip-hop group, whose other members included future No Limit artist Mia X.) However, bounce is traditionally regarded as having begun in 1991, when MC T Tucker and DJ Irv released a live recording of their song "Where Dey At". DJ Jimi's 1992 album It's Jimi, which included a more polished re-recording of "Where Dey At" and the recording debut of Juvenile on "Bounce (for the Juvenile)", was another defining release for bounce as a genre.

As No Limit Records and Cash Money Records rose to their commercial peaks in the later 1990s, they diverged from bounce and produced music closer to prevailing hip-hop norms. Mystikal, who originally recorded for local label Big Boy Records before signing to Jive, was New Orleans hip-hop's first mainstream commercial success; his music bore little or no resemblance to bounce, instead adopting an "aggressive" sound. No Limit and Cash Money published some bounce music in their early years, but their most significant releases took more cues from the gangsta rap of the West Coast. This hybridization built upon the early 1990s "gangsta bounce" music of artists like Soulja Slim and U.N.L.V. However, while the most prominent exponents of New Orleans hip-hop were departing from bounce, other labels like Take Fo' Records continued to specialize in bounce exclusively. In approximately 2000, Take Fo' signed Katey Red, who is credited with founding the "sissy bounce" movement dominated by gay and transgender artists. Big Freedia, originally a backup dancer for Katey Red, has risen in the twenty-first century to become one of the biggest stars of sissy bounce and of bounce music more broadly.

New Orleans' gangsta rap movement contracted significantly in the 2000s owing to a series of misfortunes. No Limit's in-house production team, Beats by the Pound, left the label in 1999; several other artists followed throughout 1999 and 2000, while Soulja Slim—who had remained—was murdered in 2003. No Limit Records ultimately filed for bankruptcy in 2003. Cash Money saw most of its flagship stars depart the label during the same period. Hurricane Katrina then struck New Orleans in 2005, badly affecting the neighborhoods where the city's hip-hop scene had been most active and driving many already established artists to relocate. Nevertheless, New Orleans' Lil Wayne rose to become one of the biggest rap stars of the late 2000s; he also founded Young Money Entertainment, a Cash Money imprint that signed other successful acts like Drake and Nicki Minaj.

=== Miami ===
Before hip-hop reached Miami, the city had a flourishing DJing scene in the 1970s, influenced by styles like reggae that were brought to the city by its Caribbean immigrant population. Significant DJs and crews from this period include Soul Survivor DJs, South Miami DJs, and Jeff Walker, the last of whom has been cited by Luther Campbell as having influenced him personally. The music of this subculture evolved into hip-hop when it combined these influences with the 808-driven hip-hop and electro coming out of New York in the early 1980s, particularly Afrika Bambaataa's song "Planet Rock". Maggotron and Pretty Tony were among the first Miami artists to release electro-inspired music in 1983 and 1984, and MC A.D.E. helped crystallize and popularize the style with his 1985 single "Bass Rock Express". The resulting subgenre, Miami bass, soon became known for its fast tempos, typically around 125 to 130 beats per minute. Rapping was also relatively deemphasized in early Miami hip-hop; instead, vocalists typically performed repeated, call-and-response chants. Mr. Mixx of 2 Live Crew recalls that, at the time 2 Live Crew arrived in Miami, MC Shy D was the only notable rapper based in the city. (Note: Although MC Shy D was sometimes active in Miami and did perform Miami-style hip-hop, he spent the majority of his career in Atlanta.)

Miami's hip-hop style evolved in the later 1980s. After the success of 2 Live Crew's 1986 single "Throw the D", sexually charged lyrics rapidly became central to the aesthetic of Miami bass, which picked up the nickname of "booty bass" from that association. Other major Miami bass artists from this era include DJ Magic Mike and Poison Clan. Meanwhile, a separate subgenre of Miami bass known as "techno bass" or "car audio bass" emerged. This genre was entirely instrumental, so as to place complete focus on the bass-centric beats, and it made heavy use of synthesizers. Techno bass was buoyed by improvements to car audio technology in the late 1980s, and was designed to be heard from within vehicles, to maximize the intensity of the bass' reverberations. The most prominent record labels to specialize in techno bass were Miami's Pandisc Records and Sarasota's Newtown Records. After 2 Live Crew had passed their commercial peak, Miami bass evolved further into what DJ EFN has characterized as "kind of like a dance music". The 1990s also saw the wider proliferation of club-focused dance music throughout the South, causing the style to become less specifically characteristic of Miami. Nevertheless, more recent producers like Otto von Schrirach and Jesse Perez have continued to create Miami bass, while rappers like Pitbull have showcased the subgenre's influence in their bass-heavy and Latin-influenced sounds. Another Miami rapper, Trick Daddy, bridged the gap from the Miami bass era to the city's more hardcore 21st-century sound. Trick Daddy emerged as an associate of 2 Live Crew's Luther Campbell in 1997; he signed to Slip-n-Slide Records and helped popularize the label, which went on to sign eventual star Rick Ross. Slip-n-Slide's signees in this era also included Trina, a hardcore rapper who worked closely with Trick Daddy in reshaping in the city's regional sound. Meanwhile, DJ Khaled pivoted from being a radio DJ to releasing his own commercially successful music in the 2000s.

Miami later became a major hub of the SoundCloud rap movement of the 2010s. The Miami-based Raider Klan pioneered an ominous subgenre of hip-hop inspired by—and often sampling—Memphis rap. This genre was labeled "phonk", a term coined by Raider Klan founder SpaceGhostPurrp in songs like "Pheel tha Phonk 1990". Another wave of Miami SoundCloud rappers, spearheaded by XXXTentacion, emerged later in the decade with a raw sound built upon heavily distorted bass. This era of SoundCloud rap was compared by some authors to punk, and several of its practitioners have been linked to emo rap.

=== Memphis ===
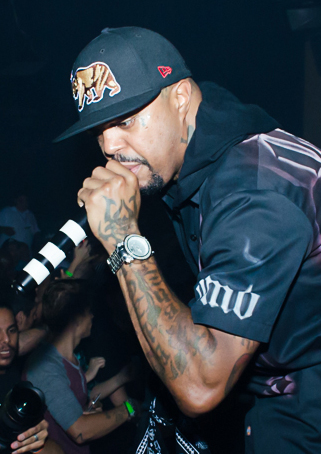
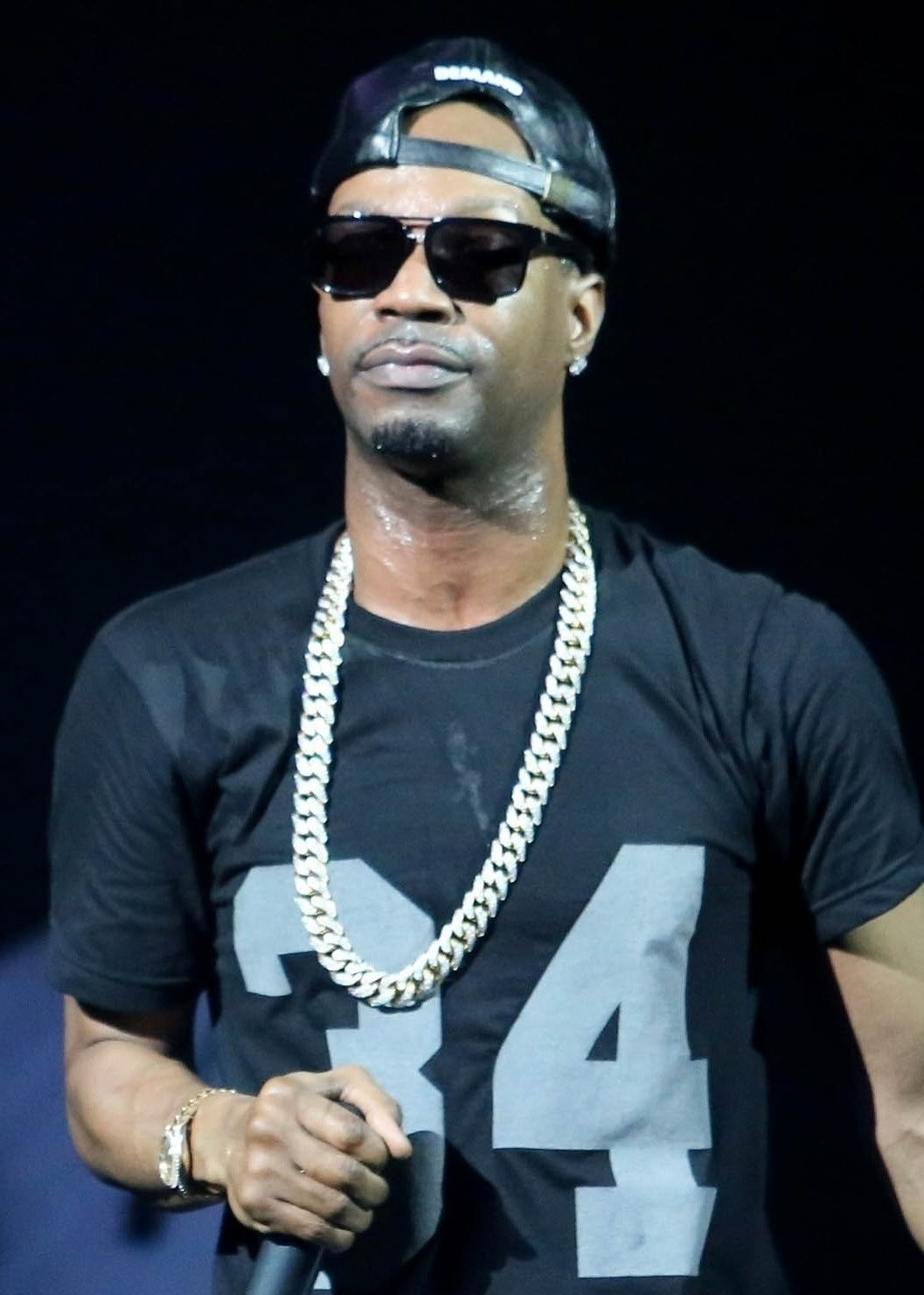
DJ Paul (left) and Juicy J (right) co-founded Three 6 Mafia, one of Memphis' most important hip-hop acts.

Memphis has long nurtured a hip-hop scene that, while it has rarely penetrated the mainstream, has nevertheless been highly influential within the South. Although some Memphis artists recorded hip-hop as early as the 1980s, with Cool K's 1986 single "I Need Money" thought to be the first such release, the early Memphis hip-hop scene was instead dominated by DJs who would curate tracks from elsewhere. Some of the era's most prominent DJs included Soni D and DJ Spanish Fly, the latter of whom is also credited with popularizing the "Triggerman beat" in Memphis hip-hop. During this period, Memphis' most significant local contributions to hip-hop were in the form of dance; a succession of dances, originating with buck jumping and evolving into Gangsta Walking and jooking, emerged in Memphis in the late 1980s and became popular.

The characteristic musical style of Memphis hip-hop began to crystallize in the 1990s. Gangsta Pat is regarded as a forefather of Memphis' hip-hop sound; he was the first signee of local label On the Strength Records, and even achieved a short-lived record deal with Atlantic Records, making him the first Memphis rapper to sign with a major label. Al Kapone was another influential On the Strength signee during the early 1990s; the hardcore hip-hop duo 8Ball & MJG also got their start with On the Strength before Tony Draper—himself a Memphis-to-Houston transplant—recruited them to his Houston-based label, Suave House Records. 8Ball & MJG's departure from Memphis left a vacuum that was initially filled by mixtape DJs such as DJ Squeeky, DJ Paul, and Juicy J. The latter two then joined forces, each bringing a group of affiliated rappers, to create the supergroup called Three 6 Mafia that dominated Memphis rap for the rest of the 1990s. The style of Memphis hip-hop has been influenced by earlier gangsta rap, both from the West Coast and from Houston. It is known for its comparatively slow tempos, sometimes even below 60 beats per minute, and for a dark and ominous aesthetic. Hi-hats, played continuously at sixteenth-note intervals, are also ubiquitous in Memphis hip-hop production. Upon this shared rhythmic base, different elements could be overlaid to create beats with different moods. These overlaid elements commonly included samples of soul music, particularly from the Memphis-based Stax Records.

A core thematic element of Memphis hip-hop is pimping, which has long been associated with Memphis street culture. In Memphis slang, the term rapidly expanded beyond its literal meaning to describe any form of successful and flashy living. Other common themes in Memphis rap include horror and Satanism, which were popularized by Three 6 Mafia; for this reason, the group has come to be seen as influential upon horrorcore and phonk. Three 6 Mafia has also been credited with establishing crunk, owing to their chanted incitements in songs like "Tear da Club Up"; (Note: Some sources characterize Memphis' early forms of crunk as a separate subgenre called "buck".) songs in that vein increasingly predominated over the horror-influenced material as Three 6 Mafia's career progressed.

=== Other areas ===
While the cities described above have historically been the primary hubs of Southern hip-hop, other artists and communities have emerged elsewhere in the South. For example, around the turn of the millennium, Virginia Beach became renowned after its local producers Timbaland and the Neptunes became major successes across both hip-hop and pop. While these artists did not associate closely with hip-hop from other Southern cities, they still achieved acclaim for a distinctive genre-blending style characterized by "spacey" synthesizers and samples of international records. Conversely, Southern-influenced rappers have occasionally emerged from non-Southern regions, such as Nelly in St. Louis.

Dallas produced two successful early rappers—Vanilla Ice and the D.O.C.—but both left the city to pursue hip-hop stardom, relocating to Miami and Los Angeles respectively. The city later became known for its "D-Town Boogie" dance movement in the 2000s. Several prominent rappers have also emerged from North Carolina, including crunk star Petey Pablo and East Coast–inspired lyricist J. Cole, as well as Little Brother, Rapsody, and DaBaby. Mississippi has yielded hip-hop artists such as David Banner, Rae Sremmurd, and Big K.R.I.T.

== Non-musical traits of Southern hip-hop ==
=== Dance ===
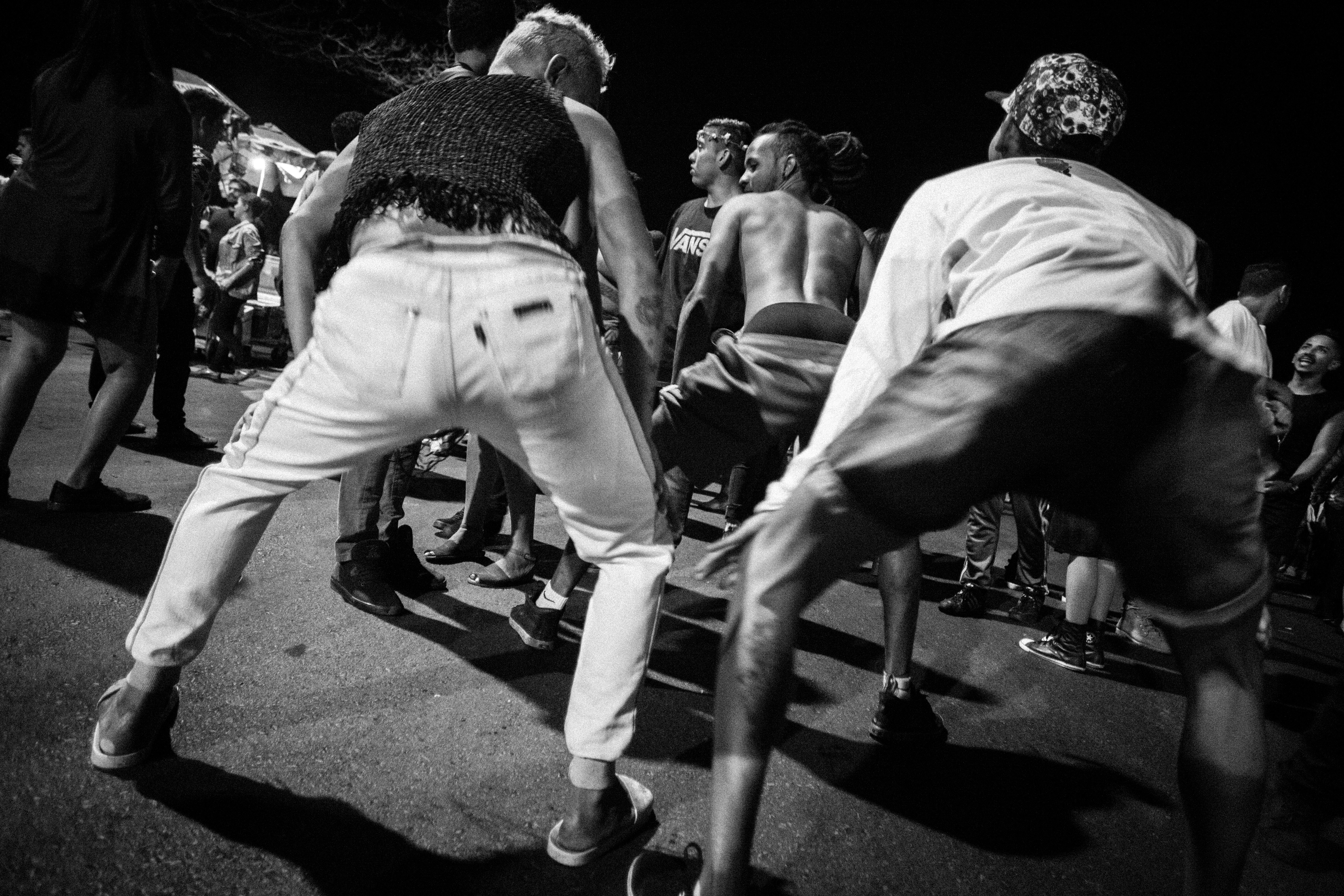
Twerking is one of the most popular dance moves to have emerged alongside Southern hip-hop.

Alongside its music, Southern hip-hop has popularized a number of forms of dance. Several of these dance styles were sexually suggestive in nature; for instance, a dance known as "throwing the dick" emerged at Luther Campbell's DJ sets in early-1980s Miami. The dance involved participants forming a large circle and pantomiming sexual intercourse, and it went on to inspire 2 Live Crew's breakthrough 1986 single "Throw the D". Campbell has also argued that throwing the dick was a precursor to twerking, which arose in New Orleans in the early 1990s before ascending in popularity to become "fundamental to Southern hip-hop culture". Cheeky Blakk's 1994 track "Twerk Something" is credited as the song that introduced the term "twerk" to wider audiences. Twerking is also closely affiliated with a similar move known as "pussy-popping" that emerged alongside Miami bass before spreading throughout the South.

Other dance styles affiliated with Southern hip-hop are more aggressive. One prominent example is the buck jump, which Memphis DJs like DJ Spanish Fly popularized in the late 1980s at venues like Club No Name. The buck jump was an erratic, violent dance that could involve actions like stomping and throwing elbows. As Memphis hip-hop evolved, the buck jump developed into a more formalized dance known as the Gangsta Walk, which involved rhythmically marching around the dance floor in a circular pattern. The buck jump also traveled to Atlanta, where the same aggressive dance style became affiliated with crunk music at its height.

Some Southern hip-hop dances have been popularized through instructional songs. Soulja Boy's "Crank That" is a prominent example; music writers note that Soulja Boy released videos demonstrating and teaching the 'Crank That' dance, and credit those videos as a factor in the song's virality. In the 2010s, Atlanta hip-hop promoted a number of dance trends, such as the Nae Nae and the Hit Dem Folks. Meanwhile, Dallas developed a long legacy of hip-hop dance that only attracted wider attention after its D-Town Boogie traveled to the West Coast and inspired the 2010 single "Teach Me How to Dougie".

Dance and live performance have also played an important role in the proliferation and distribution of Southern hip-hop music. Strip clubs have become an important venue for testing the appeal and impact of new Southern rap releases, particularly in Atlanta, where such establishments are especially widespread. As Atlanta rapper I-20 describes it:

The stripper is your first test audience if you're a local rapper. And whatever she keeps requesting to dance off of, that's gonna be the shit and that's what's gon' leak it to the regular club and that club's gon' leak it to the radio.

This symbiotic relationship between Southern hip-hop and strip clubs reached its height during the crunk era, when artists such as the Ying Yang Twins deliberately calibrated their music for maximum effect in the strip club environment. Crunk, and its successor snap, also regularly featured lyrics that discussed strip clubs. Miami is another Southern city whose local hip-hop has been strongly associated with the city's strip club scene, and Houston rappers like Mike Jones have also sought to promote themselves by building audiences at strip clubs.

=== Slang ===
Writers have highlighted the usage and popularization of local slang as a noteworthy feature of Southern hip-hop. Some early acts, like Jermaine Dupri's artists, aimed to minimize their usage of regional slang, but by the late 1990s, albums like 400 Degreez were attaining commercial success while freely employing terms unfamiliar to a general audience.

Mr. Mixx of 2 Live Crew has argued that Miami originated a number of early hip-hop slang terms, such as "fuckboy" and "baby mama". Meanwhile, journalist Ben Westhoff identifies Houston as a city that has had an especially distinctive slang tradition. UGK in particular was one of the most significant acts to have raised the profile of Houston slang, most notably on their 1996 breakthrough project, Ridin' Dirty. The adjective "trill" is one of the most prominent terms UGK popularized; originating as a portmanteau of "true" and "real", it denotes being "hard and worthy of respect" and communicates pride in a Texan identity. Another of the most significant slang terms to emerge from Southern hip-hop is "bling-bling", a word initially referring to glittering jewelry before expanding to refer to a general sense of lavishness. The term was popularized by New Orleans rapper B.G.'s 1999 single "Bling Bling", and by 2003, it had spread widely enough to be added to Webster's Dictionary.

Several significant Southern hip-hop subgenres also derived their names from local slang terms. Before it described a music genre, the word "crunk" originated as a past-tense form of "crank" used in Memphis; as applied to a person, it referred to being in a "cranked-up" state of excitement, comparable to a revved-up vehicle. After crunk music became popular, the unfamiliarity of the word led to a number of false etymologies emerging, such as the claim that it was a combination of "crazy" and "drunk". Similarly, well before T.I. popularized the phrase "trap music", the term "trap" was used in the South to refer to a drug house. "Trapping" could also exist as a verb, alluding to dealing drugs in such an environment.

=== Other cultural signifiers ===
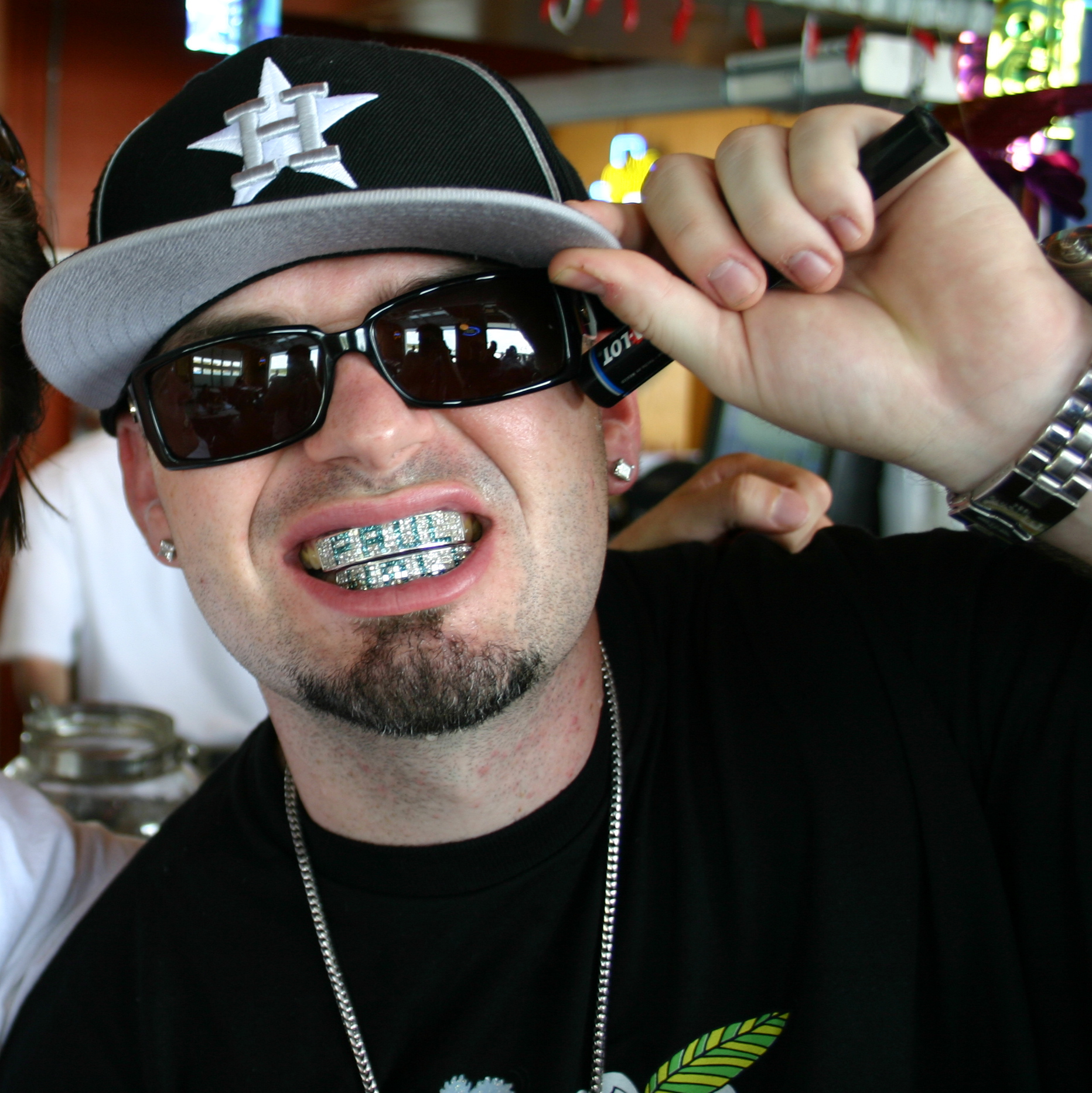
Houston's Paul Wall (pictured in 2005) sporting grills. Wall played a major role in spreading the accessory throughout Southern hip-hop in the 2000s.

A number of other practices have become closely associated with Southern hip-hop. Car culture influences the themes of Southern hip-hop, particularly in Houston, where the city is highly car-dependent and car customization is a popular pastime. Southern hip-hop styles such as Miami's car audio bass and Houston's chopped and screwed music have built reputations as specifically optimized for listening from within a vehicle. Car-themed songs and car-related terminology have been popularized by Houston rappers such as UGK and Paul Wall. Houston rappers have also historically promoted their music locally by driving around the city, playing it at high volumes and selling records from their trunks. Another practice popularized by Southern hip-hop is the consumption of lean, a drug cocktail centered on codeine-based cough syrup. While the usage of lean predates Southern hip-hop by decades, the two became closely affiliated in the 1990s, as lean was a favorite drug of Houston trailblazer DJ Screw. Screw's eponymous slowed-down production style, chopped and screwed, has been widely compared to the experience of being under the influence of lean, and Houston rappers frequently encouraged lean usage in their lyrics. By the twenty-first century, lean had transcended Houston and spread throughout the South; Memphis' Three 6 Mafia were characterized as notable promoters of the drug, and New Orleans' Lil Wayne attracted significant tabloid attention for his lean consumption in the late 2000s. The effects of lean are also thought to have influenced the woozy stylings of the mumble rap acts of the 2010s.

The practice of wearing of grills on one's teeth has become associated with Southern hip-hop as well. Grills were occasionally worn by 1990s Southern rappers, including 8Ball & MJG and the Cash Money roster; however, they ascended to greater popularity in the 2000s, when Houston rapper Paul Wall began a business partnership with Vietnamese-born jeweler Johnny Dang. Wall and other Houston rappers prominently wore grills in their music videos, as well as marketing them to other celebrities such as Lil Jon, making the accessory emblematic of the decade's Southern hip-hop. Southern rap albums were also frequently identifiable by the distinctive album covers produced by Houston design firm Pen & Pixel. The firm's house style featured showy Photoshop collages of densely packed signs of luxury, and text that was frequently textured to appear as if it were jeweled or plated in gold. Pen & Pixel reportedly produced thousands of graphics in this vein throughout the 1990s, most famously for the numerous releases from New Orleans' No Limit Records, before closing its doors in 2003.

== Bibliography ==
- Abrams, Jonathan (2022). The Come Up: An Oral History of the Rise of Hip-Hop. Crown. ISBN 9781984825155.
- Bradley, Regina N. (2021). Chronicling Stankonia: The Rise of the Hip-Hop South. University of North Carolina Press. ISBN 9781469661971.
- Grem, Darren E. (2006). "'The South Got Something to Say': Atlanta's Dirty South and the Southernization of Hip-Hop America". Southern Cultures. 12 (4). University of North Carolina Press: 55–73.
- Hess, Mickey, ed. (2010). Hip Hop in America: A Regional Guide. Vol. 2. ABC-CLIO. ISBN 9780313343223.
- Lewis, Heidi R. (2025). Make Rappers Rap Again: Interrogating the Mumble Rap "Crisis". Oxford University Press. ISBN 9780197773826.
- Palmer, Tamara (2005). Country Fried Soul: Adventures in Dirty South Hip-Hop. Backbeat Books. ISBN 0879308575.
- Sarig, Roni (2007). Third Coast: Outkast, Timbaland, and How Hip-Hop Became a Southern Thing. Da Capo Press. ISBN 9780306814303.
- Sanneh, Kelefa (2021). Major Labels: A History of Music in Seven Genres. Penguin Publishing Group. ISBN 9780525559610.
- Vaught, Seneca; Bradley, Regina N. (2017). "Of the Wings of Traplanta: (Re)Historicizing W.E.B. Du Bois' Atlanta in the Hip Hop South". Phylon. 54 (2): 11–27.
- Westhoff, Ben (2011). Dirty South: Outkast, Lil Wayne, Soulja Boy, and the Southern Rappers who Reinvented Hip-Hop. Chicago Review Press. ISBN 9781569766064.
