= No. 1 Suspect =

#1 Suspect

Studio album by Gangsta Pat
- Released: 1991
- Genre: Gangsta rap
- Length: 39:23
- Label: Atlantic

Gangsta Pat chronology
#1 Suspect (1991)	All About Comin' Up (1992)

Professional ratings
Review scores
Source	Rating
AllMusic	1.5/5 stars

#1 Suspect is the debut album by Memphis rapper Gangsta Pat, released in 1991.

== Track listing ==
1. #1 Suspect
2. Gangstas Need Love 2
3. Legion of Doom
4. Homicide
5. Shootin' on Narcs
6. Incarcerated
7. I'm tha Gangsta
8. Gangsta Shit
9. Project Pimps
10. You Can't Get None
