= Crip Walk =

Dance move

- Demonstration of the crip walk
- Genre: Hip-hop dance
- Year: Early 1970s
- Origin: Compton, California, U.S.

The Crip Walk, also known as the C-Walk, is a dance move that was created in the 1970s by first generation Crip members as a method of expression and communication, and has since spread worldwide without its linguistic aspects.

== Overview ==
The dance is primarily an act of performing quick and intricate footwork. The rivalry between the Crips and the Bloods spilled over into the world of entertainment, with the adoption of the gang dance by various rappers on the West Coast of the United States, who gave it its name, the Crip Walk. This dance involves the movement of one's feet, often to the spelling of C-R-I-P. It was used by Crips at parties to display affiliation, particularly vis-a-vis rival gang the Bloods. MTV for a time declined to broadcast any music videos that contained the Crip Walk, and some school principals banned it.

== In popular culture ==
Serena Williams briefly performed the dance at the 2012 Summer Olympic tennis tournament after defeating Maria Sharapova in the gold-medal match at Centre Court, Wimbledon; she later stated, "it was just a dance. I didn't know that's what it was called." In the Super Bowl LVI halftime show in 2022, a synchronized Crip Walk was led by Snoop Dogg. The Super Bowl LIX halftime show in 2025 headlined by Kendrick Lamar featured Serena Williams briefly doing the Crip Walk.

== Documentary ==
American rapper CJ Mac released a documentary focused on the beginnings of Crip Walk and its rise in popularity entitled "Cwalk: It's a Way of Livin'". It features rappers such as Snoop Dogg, WC and Ice-T along with original members of the Crips.

== See also ==
- Gangsta Walking
