= Sex, Money, & Murder =

Studio album by Gangsta Pat
- Released: April 26, 1994
- Genre: Gangsta rap
- Length: 61:43
- Label: Wrap/Ichiban
- Producer: LeRoy McMath

Gangsta Pat chronology
All About Comin' Up (1994)	Sex, Money, & Murder (1994)	Deadly Verses (1995)

Professional ratings
Review scores
Source	Rating
AllMusic	1.5/5 stars

Sex, Money, & Murder is an album by Gangsta Pat.

== Track listing ==
1. "Intro" – 2:16
2. "That Type" – 4:21
3. "That Girl" – 3:46
4. "Can't Mess Wit Me" – 3:56
5. "Blunted Up" – 2:10
6. "Homicidal Lifestyle" – 4:39
7. "The Saga Continues" (featuring Villain) – 4:11
8. "Let It Flow" (featuring Villain) – 4:02
9. "Real G's Don't Die" – 4:27
10. "Shootin' on Narcs, Pt. 2" – 3:02
11. "Sex, Money, Murder" – 4:11
12. "Gangsta Luv" – 4:56
13. "Stupid" – 1:34
14. "Pimp'n Ain't Dead" – 4:53
15. "Natural High" – 4:51
16. "That Type of Gangsta" [remix] – 3:48
17. "Dedication" – 1:18
