= The Story of My Life (Gangsta Pat album) =

Studio album by Gangsta Pat
- Released: May 13, 1997
- Genre: Gangsta rap
- Label: Redrum
- Producer: Gangsta Pat

Gangsta Pat chronology
| Homicidal Lifestyle (1997) | The Story of My Life (1997) | Gangsta Pat & the Street Muthafuckas (1998) |

Professional ratings
Review scores
| Source | Rating |
|---|---|
| Allmusic | 2/5 stars |

The Story of My Life is an album released by Gangsta Pat 1997.

== Track listing ==
1. No Sympathy - 4:02
2. Sittin on tha Porch - 4:31
3. Droppin' Bombs - 2:51
4. Mind on My Money - 4:30
5. Mad World - 4:17
6. The Story of My Life - 4:42
7. I Wanna Smoke, Pt. 3 - 4:22
8. Bloody Murder - 4:07
9. Back & Forth - 4:06
10. Keep It Real - 4:14
11. Untouchable - 4:31
12. G's Aint Suppose to Cry - 5:08
13. Death B-4 Dishonesty - 4:28
14. God Is Real - 4:30
15. Real Niggas Toat Glocks - 4:31
