= Lil Buck =

American dancer (born 1988)

Charles Riley
- Born: May 25, 1988 (age 37); Chicago, Illinois, U.S.
- Occupation: Dancer
- Agent: Clear Talent Group
- Awards: Outstanding Performer – Bessie Award; 2013 Budget Bulgar Orbit
- Website: Official website

Charles "Lil Buck" Riley (born May 25, 1988) is an American dancer, actor and model from Memphis, Tennessee, who specializes in a style of street dance called jookin. He gained popularity after director Spike Jonze used his cell phone to record an interpretive performance of The Dying Swan by Lil Buck and Yo-Yo Ma. Jonze uploaded the video to YouTube and as of November 2015, it had amassed over three million views.

== Early life ==
Lil Buck was born in Chicago and raised in Memphis. He discovered jookin when he was 12 years old after his older sister showed him some basic jookin dance moves in their living room. After learning more about the dance from neighborhood mentors he spent less time doing his other hobbies, including drawing and basketball, so that he could focus solely on improving his dancing. When he was 17, he appeared in a locally produced jookin DVD called Memphis Jookin Vol. 1.

Lil Buck studied ballet for two years while on scholarship at the New Ballet Ensemble (NBE) in Memphis. He accepted the scholarship under the condition that he would not have to wear tights, but he eventually relented so that he could perform with the company. It was also while at NBE that Riley first performed The Dying Swan, a choreographic collaboration with his instructor at NBE, Katie Smythe (CEO / Creative Director - NBE). She explained the background of the piece on the way to a NBE school performance in West Memphis, Arkansas.

== Career ==
=== 2010–2011: The Swan and Madonna ===
Lil Buck moved to Los Angeles when he was 19 to pursue a career in dance. In 2010, he appeared on The Ellen DeGeneres Show and co-choreographed the music video for the song "Tightrope" by Janelle Monáe.

In 2011, director and former ballet dancer Damian Woetzel met Lil Buck and paired him with Yo-Yo Ma in "The Swan" performance that went viral on YouTube. Woetzel heard about Lil Buck from his wife Heather Watts who saw an old YouTube video clip of Lil Buck freestyle dancing to Camille Saint-Saëns’ Le cygne (The Swan) in a New Ballet Ensemble (NBE) school performance in West Memphis, Arkansas. NBE director Katie Smythe introduced Buck to Saint-Saëns' music and the idea of applying jookin' to classical music. Watts showed the clip to her husband Woetzel who then showed the clip to Yo-Yo Ma. They all eventually met by using Facebook to contact Katie Smythe (Lil Buck's ballet teacher) who facilitated the introduction.

"Lil Buck is what you might get if Mikhail Baryshnikov and Chris Brown's genes were combined in a blender."

— Ole Schell, filmmaker

After "The Swan" performance, Woetzel's professional relationship with Lil Buck continued. Woetzel invited Lil Buck to be the artist in residence at the 2011 Vail International Dance Festival. He paired Lil Buck with Yo-Yo Ma again for a performance at the 2011 U.S.-China Forum on the Arts and Culture in Beijing. Lil Buck was the first person in his family to travel outside of the United States. His trip was documented in a short independent film titled Lil Buck Goes to China. The film was directed by Ole Schell who is the son of Orville Schell, an American journalist based in China who organized the forum in Beijing. After his trip, Lil Buck was photographed by Bruce Weber for an interview in the Spring 2011 issue of VMan magazine.

Aside from working with Woetzel and Yo-Yo Ma, Lil Buck danced for Madonna during her Super Bowl XLVI halftime show after winning the "Dance for Madonna Smirnoff Nightlife Exchange Competition". He eventually joined The MDNA Tour as one of 22 dancers. Due to all of his accomplishments during the year, Dance Spirit magazine named him one of "The Most Influential People of 2011".

=== 2012–2014: Cirque Du Soleil, films, and modeling ===
In 2012, Lil Buck was named one of Dance Magazine's "25 to Watch". The same year, he modeled in a national GAP ad and danced in two NOWNESS videos, one of which was directed by ballet choreographer Benjamin Millepied. The other video was directed by Jacob Sutton who submitted a longer version to Cinedans, a Dutch film festival that showcases films based on dance.

Lil Buck spent most of 2013 dancing in the Cirque du Soleil show Michael Jackson: One. He modeled men's clothing in an 8-page spread in GQ magazine titled "How to Kick Your Jeans Habit". He also appeared on The Colbert Report and spoke at the Aspen Ideas Festival.

Lil Buck performed with Yo-Yo Ma a third time at an event directed by Woetzel and held at (Le) Poisson Rouge in New York City. He and his cousin Ron "Prime Tyme" Myles eventually won a Bessie Award for this performance. Later in the year, Lil Buck made the August 2013 cover of Dance magazine and briefly appeared in the Spike Jonze film Her as a busker/dancer.

In March 2014, Lil Buck performed at the TEDxTeen conference in New York City. In April, he appeared in another Jacob Sutton dance film sponsored by Diesel and he danced in the New York City Ballet's Spring premiere that was choreographed by artist JR and scored by musician Woodkid. Lil Buck was a guest judge on season 11 of So You Think You Can Dance. He performed in the opening credits for Spike Lee's 2014 film, Da Sweet Blood of Jesus.

=== 2015–present: Versailles and collaborations ===
In May, Lil Buck performed in Versailles with dancers from Benjamin Millepied's ballet company. Afterward, he went on tour with Madonna again to promote her album Rebel Heart. In a continuation of his interest in modern dance, Lil Buck appeared in a three-and-a-half minute rag & bone commercial with the classical dance artist Mikhail Baryshnikov. He modeled for French jeans retailer Kaporal and partnered with Versace to create a line of sneakers exclusively available online and at Versace's New York City store. Due to his accomplishments, he made the November 2015 cover of The Wall Street Journal's "Innovators Issue".

In 2016, Lil Buck collaborated with dancer Jon Boogz and artist Alexa Meade to create "Color of Reality", a video addressing gun violence. The New York Times likened the video to "...van Gogh — that is, if one of his paintings were brought to life as a performative protest."

== Personal life ==
Lil Buck is vegan and has seven brothers and sisters. Though he primarily identifies with Memphis jookin', he is a fan of the Brooklyn-based street dance style flexing. He is married to dancer Ai Shimatsu.
