= Gangsta Pat =

American rapper

- Born: Patrick Alexander Hall; November 17, 1973 (age 52); Whitehaven, South Memphis, Memphis, Tennessee, U.S.
- Genres: Hip hop; horrorcore; phonk
- Occupation: Rapper
- Years active: 1989–present
- Labels: Atlantic, Wrap Records, Triad Records

Patrick Alexander Hall (born November 17, 1973) better known by his stage name Gangsta Pat, is an American rapper from Memphis, Tennessee who established himself in the Memphis rap scene during the late 1980s and 1990s. Gangsta Pat is also one of the first rap artists from the city to make the move from an indie label to a major label when signing to Atlantic records during the start of the gangsta rap era. He wrote, produced, and played all of the instruments on his early releases. He is the son of Stax Records drummer, Willie Hall.

== Discography ==
One of the first kids that really broke the scene out of Memphis on the rap scene was Gangsta Pat.

— Jackson Brown, radio DJ/independent business owner

Title	Release date
#1 Suspect	1991
All About Comin' Up	1992
Sex, Money, & Murder	1994
Deadly Verses	1995
Homicidal Lifestyle	1997
The Story of My Life	1997
Gangsta Pat & the Street Muthafuckas	1998
Tear Yo Club Down	1999
Show Ya Grill	2000
Return of the #1 Suspect	2001
Da Dro	2004
Live from Blackhaven - The EP	2013
