= Memphis rap =

Subgenre of hip hop that originated from Memphis, Tennessee

- Other names: Memphis hip-hop; Memphis horrorcore
- Stylistic origins: East Coast hip-hop; West Coast hip-hop; Miami Bass; hardcore hip hop; gangsta rap; horrorcore; lo-fi
- Cultural origins: Mid- to late 1980s, Memphis, Tennessee, United States
- Typical instruments: Sequencer; sampler; keyboard; drum machine; synthesizer

Subgenres
- Crunk; trap; phonk

Other topics
- Dirty rap; bounce; Chopped and screwed; crunk; trap

Memphis rap (also known as Memphis hip-hop, or Memphis horrorcore) is a regional subgenre of hip hop music that originated in Memphis, Tennessee, during the mid- to late 1980s.

== Characteristics ==
Memphis rap has been characterized as being low budget, using repetitive vocal hooks and a "distorted", lo-fi soundscape that uses the Roland TR-808 drum machine and minimal synth melodies. The genre commonly features double time flows with triplet flows, and routinely uses samples ranging from soul and funk to horror film scores and classical music, as well as hooks from songs by related rappers in the same genre, although DIY production without sampling is common as well. Because of the lack of resources, bedroom studios were often pushed to the extreme. Usually, the lyrics are quite dark and depict graphic subject matter. And similar to New York, their samples are known to be raw and pitched with some scratching in the background. DJ Spanish Fly had introduced the synthetic drum-kit sound with the TR-808, splitting the Memphis scene in two between those who preferred the live versus the digital sound. Alongside a strong drum beat were "cowbell, syncopated rhythms, powerful sub-bass, and sharp digital snares", these elements becoming the hallmarks of the Memphis rap sound. Looping is also a signature with no steadfast rule, although looping is used over chopped edits.The genre is often associated with lo-fi production, heavy sampling, and dark or atmospheric soundscapes.Memphis rap has been cited as an influence on the development of Phonk, a subgenre that draws on its sampling practices and sonic aesthetic.

Memphis artists released recordings on independent labels. The dominance of New York and Los Angeles's hip hop scenes forced southern artists to form an underground style and sound to compete with the other regions. Artists used a grassroots approach through word-of-mouth in the club scene and mixtapes to promote their music.Independent cassette circulation networks became an important part of preserving and distributing Memphis underground rap throughout the region. Memphis rap artists often relied on independent methods of production and distribution, including the use of cassette tapes shared through local networks. Oral history and archival preservation projects, including documentation from the Memphis Public Library, have preserved accounts from artists associated with the Memphis rap underground scene such as The Scandalous Playaz, helping document the regional cassette-era culture surrounding independent Memphis rap distribution.

== Artists ==
DJ Spanish Fly is commonly cited as one of the pioneers of the genre, being the bridge between 1980s electro-funk and the heavier gangsta rap of the following decade.

Other early artists and groups associated with Memphis rap include C-Rock, Gangsta Pat, Lil Slim, La Chat, Skimask Troopaz, Gimisum Family, Project Pat, Tommy Wright III, Princess Loko, Da Crime Click, Lil E, Stout Pimp, Bloody Bones, II Tone, DJ Squeeky, DJ Zirk, DJ Sound, Blackout, Playa Fly, Gangsta Boo, Al Kapone, Lil Heavy, Mental Ward Click, MC Mack, Lil Noid, 8Ball & MJG, and Three 6 Mafia, with the latter two achieving relative commercial success and even an Oscar. Three 6 Mafia's Mystic Stylez and other releases by members of the group such as Come with Me 2 Hell by DJ Paul and Lord Infamous and Lil Noid's Paranoid Funk were particularly influential in the genre's development.

== Influence and modern sound ==
Despite largely staying underground, it has attained a cult following on the internet from MP3 blogs, influencing rappers such as Lil Ugly Mane, Freddie Dredd, Denzel Curry, and SpaceGhostPurrp, and has seen a large boom in popularity through other artists including $uicideboy$ and other artists recording for the G59 record label. It has also brought in the rise of crunk, trap music, and phonk.

== See also ==
- Music of Tennessee
- Southern hip hop
