= Close Eyes =

Single by Dvrst

from the EP Autumn Wind
- Released: 1 February 2021
- Recorded: 2021
- Genre: Drift Phonk
- Label: Black 17 Media
- Songwriters: Juicy J; DJ Paul; Valery Zaytsev
- Producer: DVRST

Dvrst singles chronology
"Bloody Morning" (2021)	"Close Eyes" (2021)	"Dream Space" (2021)

Music video
- "Close Eyes" on YouTube

"Close Eyes" is a single by Russian producer Valera Zaitsev (Dvrst). The single saw a huge surge of popularity on platforms such as TikTok. It features vocal samples from Project Pat's 2002 track "Still Ridin' Clean" and Lil Bay's verse from DJ Sound's 1995 release "Down With The Click".

== Background ==
Released in 2021, the song gained traction through a TikTok meme known as "Titan Glow Up," referencing a character from Megamind. The meme, along with the track, gained further popularity on TikTok, and has since been used in numerous variations of "Glow Up" memes. The song currently sits at just over 570 million streams as of July 2025, while the slowed version, 130 million. The song was featured in the RIAA Class of 2023 tease. The song features vocal samples from Project Pat's 2002 track "Still Ridin' Clean".

This single from Dvrst kick-started the Drift phonk era of songs, it not only revitalized the Phonk genre but also propelled it into mainstream culture.

== Charts ==
Chart performance for "Close Eyes"
Chart (2021–2022)	Peak position
Russia Songs (Billboard)	25

== Certifications and sales ==
Certifications for "Close Eyes"
Region	Certification	Certified units/sales
New Zealand (RMNZ)	Platinum	30,000^{‡}
United Kingdom (BPI)	Silver	200,000^{‡}
United States (RIAA)	Platinum	1,000,000^{‡}
^{‡} Sales+streaming figures based on certification alone.

== See also ==
- "Murder in My Mind", a 2022 song by Kordhell
- "Metamorphosis", a 2021 song by Interworld
