= Eschaton (album) =

Studio album by Anaal Nathrakh
- Released: 16 October 2006
- Genre: Black metal; grindcore
- Length: 35:23
- Label: Season of Mist
- Producer: Mick Kenney

Anaal Nathrakh chronology
Domine Non Es Dignus (2004)	Eschaton (2006)	Hell Is Empty, and All the Devils Are Here (2007)

Eschaton is the third studio album by British extreme metal band Anaal Nathrakh. Musically, the album continues in the vein of the previous album, Domine Non Es Dignus. Some reviewers have commented that the overall atmosphere and production are at the same time a step back towards the out-and-out ferocity of the band's debut. The album features guest appearances by Shane Embury (Embryonymous) on bass, and Attila Csihar (from Mayhem) performs vocals on "Regression to the Mean".

== Background ==
The album cover art resembles parts of the Mandelbrot set. "The Necrogeddon" is a re-recording from Total Fucking Necro. The album features sound samples from the television series Blackadder II ("The Destroying Angel"), and the films Saw ("The Yellow King") and Zulu ("The Necrogeddon"). Lyrics for the song "When Lion Devours Both Dragon and Child" include an adaptation of text from the Book of Job, chapter 10, and the clean sung parts describe and quote "The Madman's Parable" by Friedrich Nietzsche. The song "The Yellow King" is based on the horror story The King in Yellow by Robert W. Chambers.

== Track listing ==
All tracks are written by Anaal Nathrakh

No.	Title	Length
1.	"Bellum Omnium Contra Omnes"	3:16
2.	"Between Shit and Piss We Are Born"	3:54
3.	"Timewave Zero"	3:01
4.	"The Destroying Angel"	3:11
5.	"Waiting for the Barbarians"	4:46
6.	"The Yellow King"	4:54
7.	"When the Lion Devours Both Dragon and Child"	4:57
8.	"The Necrogeddon"	4:11
9.	"Regression to the Mean"	3:12
Total length:		35:23

== Personnel ==
=== Anaal Nathrakh ===
- V.I.T.R.I.O.L. – vocals
- Irrumator – all instruments

=== Additional musicians ===
- Attila Csihar – vocals ("Regression to the Mean")
- Ventnor – guitar
- Drunk – samples
- Shane Embury – bass

=== Production ===
- Mick Kenney – production, recording, engineering, mixing, mastering
- Dave Hunt – mastering
