= When Fire Rains Down from the Sky, Mankind Will Reap as It Has Sown =

EP by Anaal Nathrakh
- Released: 7 August 2003
- Genre: Industrial black metal
- Length: 26:48
- Label: Mordgrimm
- Producer: Mick Kenney

Anaal Nathrakh chronology
Total Fucking Necro (2002)	When Fire Rains Down from the Sky, Mankind Will Reap as It Has Sown (2003)	Domine Non Es Dignus (2004)

When Fire Rains Down from the Sky, Mankind Will Reap as It Has Sown is the first EP by British extreme metal group Anaal Nathrakh. It was released by Mordgrimm Records in Europe and on Earache Records in North America. The EP was written right after The Codex Necro, and features guest appearances by Aborym's Sethlans Teitan on guitar and Attila Csihar of Mayhem on vocals. It was re-released in 2006 with three additional bonus live tracks. "Genesis of the Antichrist" is a remake of their earlier song "Anaal Nathrakh".

== Track listing ==
No.	Title	Length
1.	"Cataclysmic Nihilism"	4:48
2.	"How the Angels Fly In (We Can Never Be Forgiven)"	2:49
3.	"Never Fucking Again"	4:12
4.	"Genesis of the Antichrist"	4:29
5.	"Atavism"	6:06
6.	"When Fire Rains Down from the Sky, Mankind Will Reap as It Has Sown"	4:24
7.	"Human, All Too Fucking Human" (live; 2006 re-release only)	6:13
8.	"Swallow the World" (live; 2006 re-release only)	3:01
9.	"Do Not Speak" (live; 2006 re-release only)	4:39
Total length:		26:48

== Personnel ==
- Irrumator – all instruments
- Sethlans Teitan – guitar
- V.I.T.R.I.O.L. – vocals
- Attila Csihar – vocals ("Atavism")
