= DJ Yung Vamp =

Belgian music producer (born 1995)

- Also known as: Jeune Vamp; Vamp
- Born: Gregory Renard; 30 June 1995 (age 31); Liège, Belgium
- Genres: Phonk; cloud rap
- Occupations: DJ; record producer; singer
- Instruments: Synthesizer; Ableton Live; vocals
- Years active: 2010–present
- Label: Radio Juicy

Gregory Renard (born 30 June 1995), known professionally as DJ Yung Vamp or simply Vamp, is a Belgian DJ and record producer, who also uses the alias Jeune Vamp as a rapper. He has been defined as "one of the largest influencers of new-age phonk".

== Early life ==
Gregory Renard was born on 30 June 1995 in Liège, Belgium, to Belgian and Tunisian parents, and moved to Brussels later on. He lived with his parents until the age of 10, when he moved with his grandparents.

He described both his parents and his grandparents as an influence to his interest in music: his father listened to techno, his mother to techno and drum and bass, and his grandparents to jazz, blues and 1960s rock.

== Career ==
=== Early career: 2010–2016 ===
At a young age, DJ Yung Vamp's father let him try his Technics turntables; Vamp continued to mix until the age of 15–16. After his friend helped him download FL Studio, DJ Yung Vamp started to produce his own music; he switched to Ableton a short while later.

After listening to various hip hop albums, DJ Yung Vamp discovered his favourite genres: trill, phonk, grime, and trap. His main influences on the SoundCloud platform were Loud Lord, DJ Smokey, Kaytranada, Mr. Carmack, IAMNOBODI, and the Soulection collective. He also listened to Three 6 Mafia, DJ Screw, Busta Rhymes, and Missy Elliott.

At 15 years old, he released mixes under the name "Wankaz" (slang for wanker) on SoundCloud, using an old computer gifted to him by his grandfather when he was 13. He then changed his alias to DJ Yung Vamp.

=== Breakthrough: 2016–2020 ===
Initially struggling to gain popularity, DJ Yung Vamp's breakthrough came with his track I GOT MOLLY I GOT WHITE, released in 2016. He quickly became popular, amassing over 20,000 follows on SoundCloud within one year. His success can mainly be traced to the emergence of phonk as a genre, catalyzed by promotional YouTube channels such as Emotional Tokyo, Ryan Celsius, and rare. DJ Yung Vamp's tracks were heavily featured in the channels' mixes, which had millions of views, further contributing to his fame.

By the end of 2017, DJ Yung Vamp had worked with DJ Smokey, Jason Rich, and Soudiere, three of phonk's most prominent artists. Soudiere himself recruited DJ Yung Vamp to the collective "Purple Posse" in 2018, also composed of Aseri, Backwhen, and Mythic, among others. He made his debut with Purple Posse in the compilation ISSUE 08.

DJ Yung Vamp collaborated with mainstream artists such as bbno$, Mister V, Soulja Boy, Scarlxd, Yung Gravy, Thouxanbanfauni, and Chxpo. He cites Soulja Boy as his main source of inspiration, having also made a studio session together. Following the release of his EP Night off the Trill, Vol. 1 in 2017, DJ Yung Vamp was contacted by Scarlxd to collaborate. The two produced several tracks together, namely a few songs in Scarlxrd's studio album Acquired Taste Vxl 1., released in 2019.

In 2020, he released his first song as a rapper under the alias Jeune Vamp (French for Young Vamp), and launched his own fashion label called "Vampire-Corp".

== Musical style ==
A phonk producer, DJ Yung Vamp's music draws inspiration from 1990s and 2000s hip hop, and also features samples from south rap and crunk. He defined his music as "nostalgic and relaxing at the same time". Radio Juicy – his record label – has defined it as "the super contrast of chill and hard".

Compared to other contemporary phonk producers, DJ Yung Vamp's production style is more "simple", involving less layers and more readily-available sounds. His style has also been seen as "consistent", consisting of a slow jazz sample, mainstream vocals, and simple drums.

== Discography ==
- More Blood In My Cup, Vol. 1 (2016)
- Night off the Trill, Vol. 1 (2017)
- I Need More Blood, Vol. 1 (2017)
- Night off the Trill, Vol. 2 (2018)
- Night off the Trill, Vol. 3 (2018)
- Die Trill, Vol. 1 (2019)
- Die Trill, Vol. 2 (2019)
- Die Trill, Vol. 3 (2020)
- I Need More Blood, Vol. 2 (2022)
- Vampire Vices Seazon (2025)
