= Killing Music =

Studio album by Benediction
- Released: 25 August 2008
- Recorded: 2005–2008
- Genre: Death metal
- Length: 54:09
- Label: Nuclear Blast
- Producer: Mick Kenney, Benediction

Benediction chronology
| Organised Chaos (2001) | Killing Music (2008) | Scriptures (2020) |

Killing Music is the seventh studio album by British death metal band Benediction. It was released on the Nuclear Blast label in 2008. Two versions have been released: a regular jewel case edition CD, and also a limited edition CD that comes packaged with a bonus DVD.

== Track listing ==
| No. | Title | Length |
|---|---|---|
| 1. | "Intro" | 1:32 |
| 2. | "The Grey Man" | 2:42 |
| 3. | "Controlopolis (Rats in the Mask)" | 2:52 |
| 4. | "Killing Music" | 3:39 |
| 5. | "They Must Die Screaming" | 3:55 |
| 6. | "Dripping with Disgust" | 3:56 |
| 7. | "Wrath and Regret" | 3:46 |
| 8. | "As Her Skin Weeps" | 1:51 |
| 9. | "Cold, Deathless, Unrepentant" | 3:06 |
| 10. | "Immaculate Façade" | 4:49 |
| 11. | "Burying the Hatchet" | 1:56 |
| 12. | "Beg, You Dogs" | 3:52 |
| 13. | "Betrayer" (bonus track) | 3:56 |
| 14. | "They Bleed" (bonus track) | 5:24 |
| 15. | "Seeing Through My Eyes" (Broken Bones cover) (bonus track) | 2:41 |
| 16. | "Largactyl" (Amebix cover) (bonus track) | 4:12 |

== Credits ==
- Dave Hunt – vocals
- Darren Brookes – guitars
- Peter Rewinsky – guitars
- Frank Healy – bass guitar
- Neil Hutton – drums
- Big K of Smoking Beagle Design – cover artwork and inlay
