= Metamorphosis (Interworld song) =

2021 single by Interworld

Single by Interworld
- Released: November 25, 2021
- Genre: Drift phonk
- Length: 2:22
- Label: Black 17 Media
- Songwriter: Ivan Belozerov
- Producer: Interworld

Interworld singles chronology
"Requiem of Souls" (2021)	"Metamorphosis" (2021)	"Snowfall" (2021)

"Metamorphosis" (stylized in all caps) is a song by Russian drift phonk producer Interworld. It was released as a single on November 25, 2021, and charted internationally.

== Content ==
"Metamorphosis" was sampled of DJ Livewire's "Deep Throat." Its cover art features influencer arisa.vurr.

== Charts ==
=== Weekly charts ===
Weekly chart performance for "Metamorphosis"
Chart (2022–2023)	Peak position
Canada (Canadian Hot 100)	79
Global 200 (Billboard)	101
Ireland (IRMA)	50
Lithuania (AGATA)	18
Portugal (AFP)	158
Switzerland (Schweizer Hitparade)	75
UK Singles (OCC)	68
US Hot Dance/Electronic Songs (Billboard)	7

=== Year-end charts ===
2022 year-end chart performance for "Metamorphosis"
Chart (2022)	Position
US Hot Dance/Electronic Songs (Billboard)	79

2023 year-end chart performance for "Metamorphosis"
Chart (2023)	Position
US Hot Dance/Electronic Songs (Billboard)	13

== Certifications ==
Region	Certification	Certified units/sales
Spain (PROMUSICAE)	Gold	30,000^{‡}
United Kingdom (BPI)	Silver	200,000^{‡}
United States (RIAA)	Platinum	1,000,000^{‡}
^{‡} Sales+streaming figures based on certification alone.

== See also ==
- "Murder in My Mind", a 2022 song by Kordhell
- "Close Eyes", a 2021 song by DVRST
