= Mistress (band) =

British metal band

- Origin: Birmingham, England
- Genres: Sludge metal, grindcore
- Years active: 1999–2008; 2009 (partial reunion)
- Label: Earache Records
- Members: Misery; Dave Hunt; Dirty Von Arse; Mick Kenney; Drunken

Mistress were a British sludge metal/grindcore band from Birmingham, England. The five members adopted stage names: Drunken and Misery on guitars, Dirty Von Arse on bass, Dave Cunt on vocals and Migg on drums. Dave Cunt (a.k.a. Dave Hunt) is also a member of Anaal Nathrakh, and Migg (a.k.a. Mick Kenney) is in several other bands, including Anaal Nathrakh, Exploder, Fukpig and Frost. Misery (Paul Kenney, Mick's older brother) also plays in Fukpig and Kroh. Mistress announced their split in 2008.

== History ==
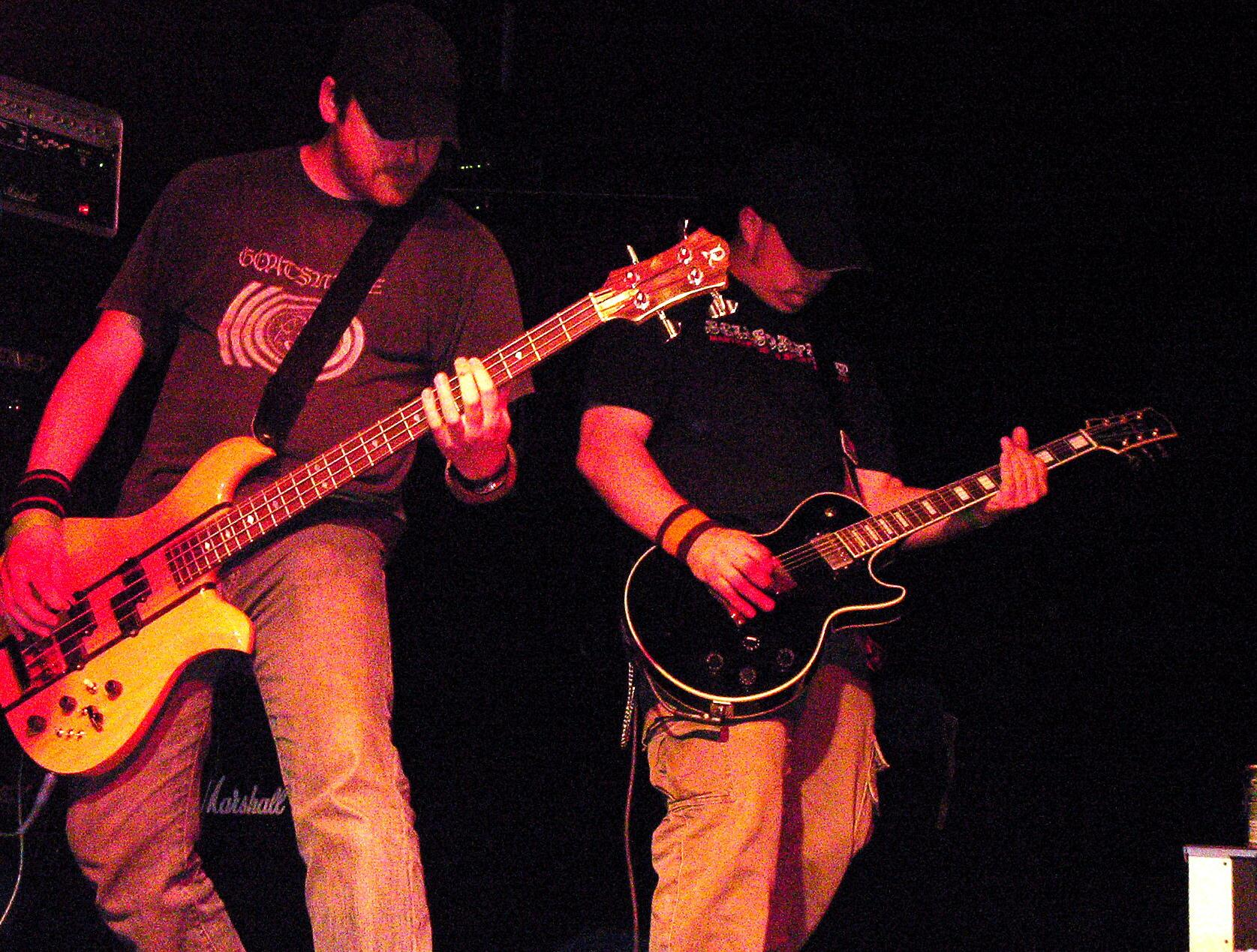
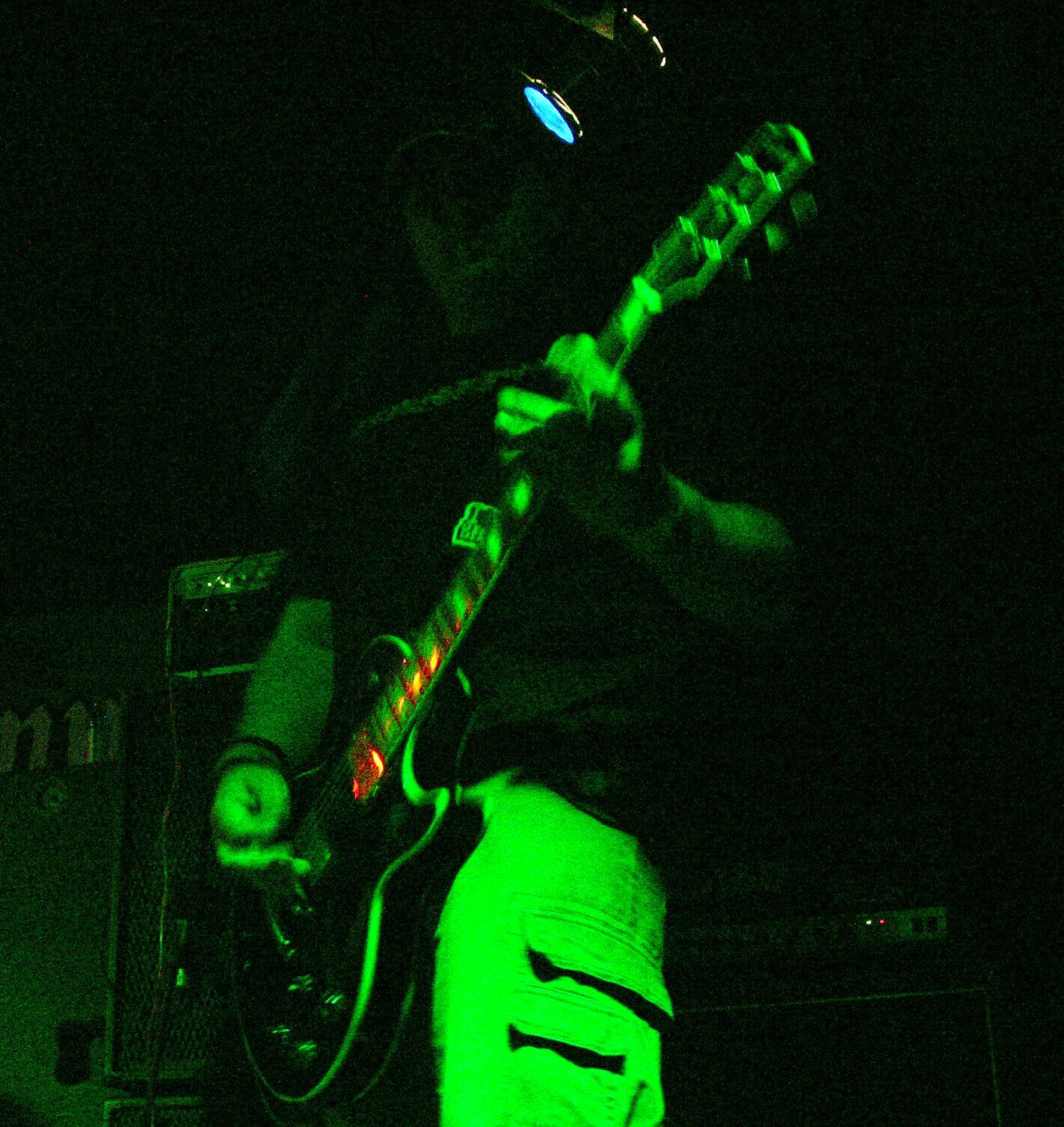
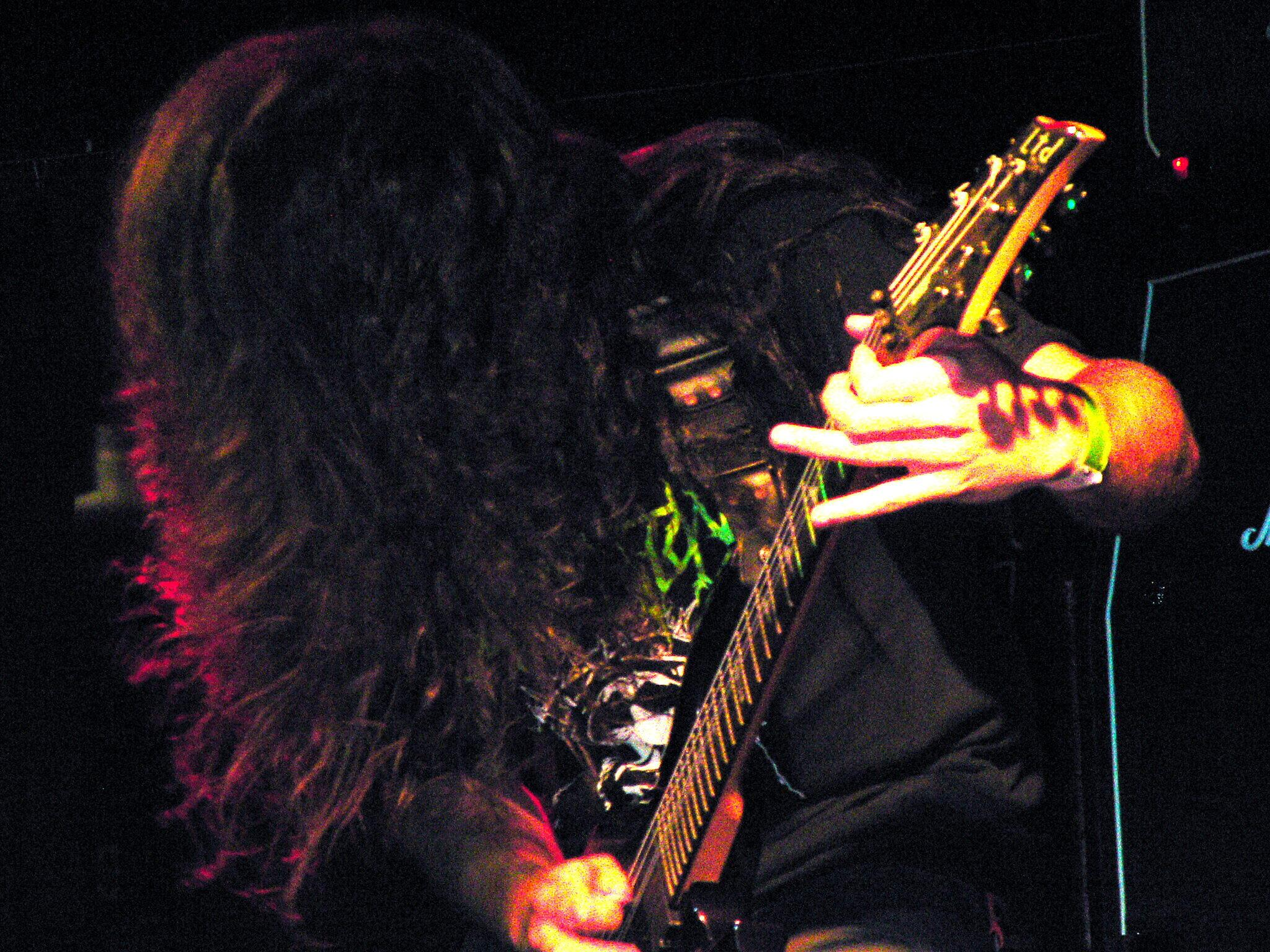
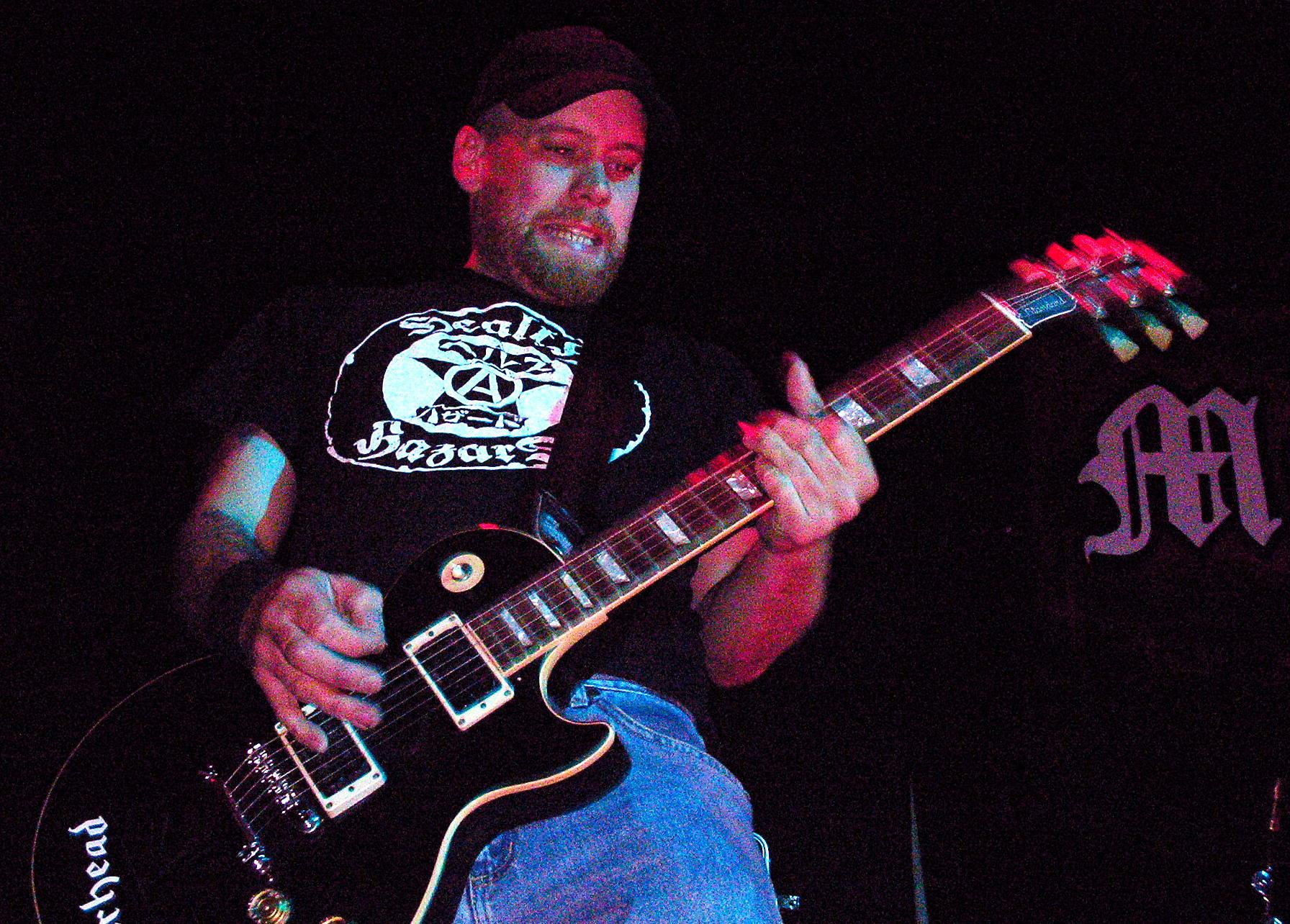
Mistress performing in 2006

The band formed at the end of the 1990s in Birmingham and began playing their take on the Iron Monkey / Eyehategod sludge sound. The band was noted for their offensive, yet intellectual lyrics and heavy, downtuned sound.

In 2001, Mistress released two demos, Fuck Off and Lord Worm, which got them signed to underground extreme music label Rage of Achilles. Their first full-length album for the label was the self-titled Mistress in April 2002, which received broadly good critical reviews. The follow-up, October 2003's Mistress II: The Chronovisor, helped establish them as a metal band, along with their growing live reputation.

The band's sonic rage ensured that they were soon picked up by the much larger Nottingham-based Earache Records, who issued Mistress' third full-length album, In Disgust We Trust, in June 2005. In July 2005, Mistress recorded a live session of songs from the album for broadcast on the BBC Radio 1 Rock Show. In the same year, Earache re-issued the band's first two albums.

After Earache dropped them during 2006, the band signed to Mick Kenney and Shane Embury's label, FETO Records. On 23 April 2007, they released their fourth studio album through FETO Records, The Glory Bitches of Doghead, which abandoned sludge in favour of grind. The album has an ambient track running throughout (consisting of various noises, including what seems to be rain) created by Misery, which can be heard between songs, adding depth to the music.

Mistress appeared on the Christmas special of Never Mind the Buzzcocks, performing Christmas carols in sludge metal.

Mistress announced their break up in March 2008.

=== One Last Show ===
Mistress performed one last show on 24 October 2009 at Damnation Festival.

== Members ==
- Dave Hunt (also known as Dave Cunt, Vitriol) — vocals
- Misery (Paul Kenney) — guitar
- Drunken (Duncan Wilkins) — guitar
- Dirty Von Arse — bass
- Mick Kenney (also known as Migg, Irrumator) — drums
- Earl Robinson — bass for first demo and first few gigs

== Discography ==
=== Demos ===
- Fuck Off (2001)
- Lord Worm (2001)

=== Albums ===
- Mistress (2002)
- Mistress II: The Chronovisor (2003)
- In Disgust We Trust (2005)
- The Glory Bitches of Doghead (2007)
