= Make Them Die Slowly =

Make Them Die Slowly may refer to:

- Make Them Die Slowly (album), the second studio album by White Zombie
- Make Them Die Slowly (band), a British black metal band
- Cannibal Ferox, a 1981 Italian film, known in the US as Make Them Die Slowly
