= Murder in My Mind =

Murder in My Mind may refer to:

- Murder in My Mind (film), a 1997 television film
- "Murder in My Mind" (song), a 2022 song by Kordhell

== See also ==
- "Murder on My Mind", a 2018 song by American rapper YNW Melly
