= In the Constellation of the Black Widow =

Studio album by Anaal Nathrakh
- Released: 29 June 2009
- Genre: Black metal; grindcore; industrial metal
- Length: 34:40
- Label: Candlelight; FETO
- Producer: Mick Kenney

Anaal Nathrakh chronology
| Hell Is Empty, and All the Devils Are Here (2007) | In the Constellation of the Black Widow (2009) | Passion (2011) |

In the Constellation of the Black Widow is the fifth studio album by British extreme metal band Anaal Nathrakh, released on 29 June 2009 by Candlelight Records. The album was also released on LP, limited to 500 copies. 250 copies are pressed on black and white splatter vinyl, and 250 copies are pressed on black and purple vinyl.

The album title is derived from a passage in the book Moment of Freedom by Norwegian writer Jens Bjørneboe. The cover art is taken from Gustave Doré's illustrations to "The Raven". "Satanarchrist" is a re-recording from Total Fucking Necro.

== Track listing ==
All tracks are written by Anaal Nathrakh

| No. | Title | Length |
|---|---|---|
| 1. | "In the Constellation of the Black Widow" | 4:45 |
| 2. | "I Am the Wrath of Gods and the Desolation of the Earth" | 2:24 |
| 3. | "More of Fire Than Blood" | 3:26 |
| 4. | "The Unbearable Filth of the Soul" | 3:32 |
| 5. | "Terror in the Mind of God" | 3:27 |
| 6. | "So Be It" | 2:23 |
| 7. | "The Lucifer Effect" | 3:57 |
| 8. | "Oil Upon the Sores of Lepers" | 2:48 |
| 9. | "Satanarchrist" | 4:41 |
| 10. | "Blood Eagles Carved on the Backs of Innocents" | 3:17 |
| Total length: | | 34:40 |

== Personnel ==
Anaal Nathrakh

- V.I.T.R.I.O.L. – vocals
- Mick Kenney – guitars, bass, drums, drum programming

Additional musicians

- Zeitgeist Memento (Repvblika) – vocals ("Oil Upon the Sores of Lepers")
- Barm "Ventnor" Frog – additional guitars ("In the Constellation of the Black Widow", "More of Fire Than Blood")
