= Memory Reboot =

Single by VØJ and Narvent

from the album Memory Reboot
- Released: January 13, 2023
- Genre: Synthwave; electronic
- Producers: VØJ; Narvent

Memory Reboot is a song recorded by the Ukrainian musician VØJ and the Russian musician, Farkhod Musulmonov, known professionally as Narvent. It was released as a single on January 13, 2023, and later included in an album of the same name.

"Memory Reboot" is primarily a synthwave track, with elements of retrowave. It contains traces of phonk and cinematic music as well, and has been noted as an emotional track.

In a review of the full album, a reviewer for diazable.com put particular praise on Memory Reboot, and commenting that the album as a whole demands attention, challenges expectations, and, most importantly, connects with listeners on an emotional level.

== Chart performance ==
Weekly chart performance for "Memory Reboot
Chart (2023)	Peak position
UK Independent Singles Breakers (OCC)	20
US Hot Dance/Electronic Songs (Billboard)	13

=== Year-end charts ===
2023 year-end chart performance for "Memory Reboot"
Chart (2023)	Peak position
US Hot Dance/Electronic Songs (Billboard)	47

2024 year-end chart performance for "Memory Reboot"
Chart (2024)	Peak position
US Hot Dance/Electronic Songs (Billboard)	63

== Certifications ==
Certifications for "Memory Reboot"
Region	Certification	Certified units/sales
United States (RIAA)	Gold	500,000^{‡}
^{‡} Sales+streaming figures based on certification alone.
