= Make Them Die Slowly (band) =

British extreme metal band

- Origin: Birmingham, England, United Kingdom
- Genres: Blackened grindcore; industrial metal
- Years active: 2020–present
- Labels: FETO Records
- Members: Officer R. Kordhell; The Void; Walter; Doofus

Make Them Die Slowly are a British black metal band, formed by Mick Kenney of Anaal Nathrakh in 2020.

== History ==
Make Them Die Slowly were formed by Mick Kenney and Duncan Wilkins, operating under the stage names of Officer R. Kordhell and The Void respectively, as a celebration of vintage gore movies. Their name and first album are both derived from the Italian horror film Cannibal Ferox (released as Make Them Die Slowly in the US). Some of the band's identities are unknown; their drummer goes by the pseudonym Walter, and another member is named Doofus, whose role in the band is also unknown. In May 2020 they released their first album, Ferox. Sixth months later they followed up with their second studio album, The Bodycount Continues.

== Musical style ==
Musically the band is similar to Kenney's main project Anaal Nathrakh, combining grindcore with black metal, with heavy use of industrial and synthesised elements, and occasional choral music.

== Band members ==
- Officer R. Kordhell – guitars, bass, drum programming, programming (2020–present)
- The Void – vocals (2020–present)
- Walter – drums (2020–present)
- Doofus – unknown (2020–present)

== Discography ==
=== Studio albums ===
- Ferox (2020)
- The Bodycount Continues (2020)

=== Singles ===
- The Terror Begins (2020)
- Slaughter High (2020)
- Silent Night Murder Night (2020)
- My Bloody Valentine (2021)
