= Scarlxrd =

British rapper (born 1994)

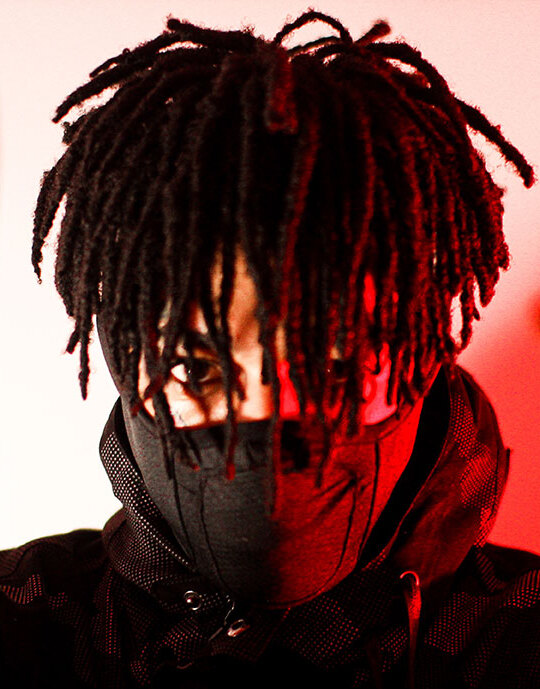
- Scarlxrd in 2021

Background information
- Also known as: Mazzi Maz
- Born: Marius Lucas Antonio Listhrop; 19 June 1994 (age 32); Wolverhampton, West Midlands, England
- Genres: Trap metal; rap metal; hip hop; nu metal; drift phonk
- Occupations: Rapper; singer-songwriter; YouTuber (formerly)
- Instrument: Vocals
- Years active: 2014–present
- Labels: Island; Lxrd
- Formerly of: Myth City

Marius Lucas Antonio Listhrop (born 19 June 1994), known professionally as Scarlxrd (pronounced "Scarlord"), is an English rapper, singer-songwriter, and former YouTuber. He is known for his unique musical style and is considered a pioneer of the trap metal genre, a combination of trap music and heavy metal. Formerly known under his YouTube moniker Mazzi Maz, he began a career in music as the vocalist for nu metal band Myth City before debuting as a rapper under the Scarlxrd name.

He rose to prominence after the music video for his single "Heart Attack" which gained significant attention, gaining over 100 million views on YouTube as of February 2023. He has since released other successful songs, namely "King, Scar", "6 Feet", "Berzerk", and "Head Gxne".

== Early and personal life ==
Listhrop was born on 19 June 1994 in Wolverhampton, West Midlands, England. His father is half-Ghanaian and half-Jamaican, while his mother is half Jamaican and half English.

== YouTube career ==
Before he started a career in music, Listhrop began uploading videos on YouTube as Mazzi Maz. His personality on the site was described as a "perky" and "super-smiley YouTuber" who recorded and published vlogs in his bedroom. He often collaborated with friends and fellow YouTube personalities Sam Pepper and Caspar Lee. From late-2013 to mid-2014, Listhrop and Pepper embarked on a worldwide comedy-music tour, "WDGAF Tour". By February 2017, Listhrop removed all of his Mazzi Maz videos from his YouTube channel and has since rebranded it to his Scarlxrd moniker. In a 2018 Interview, Listhrop described his time as a YouTube personality and posting videos on the site as "soul-destroying".

== Music career ==
=== 2014–2016: Myth City ===
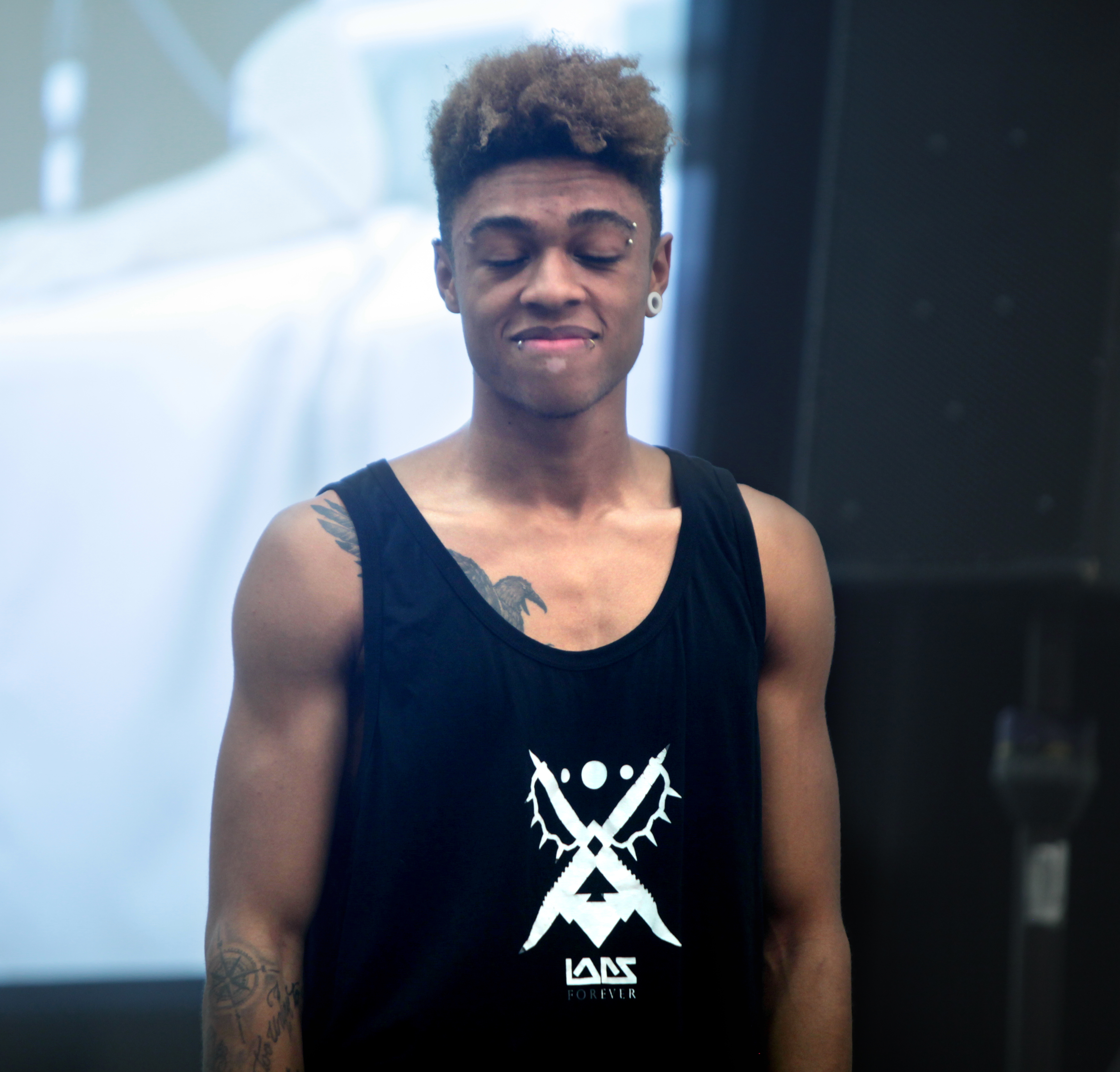
Listhrop speaking at the 2014 VidCon at the Anaheim Convention Center in Anaheim, California

In 2014, Listhrop founded the nu metal/rap rock band Myth City, in which he performed as the vocalist. Listhrop also described the band's sound as a fusion of rap music and grindcore. The band's YouTube channel quickly gained a following mainly consisting of Mazzi Maz fans, who gave the group a mixed reception; fans responded positively to Listhrop's screamed vocals, but were confused on the contrast between the band's harsh musical style and Listhrop's "smiley" YouTube videos. Myth City released their self-titled debut EP on 28 February 2015.

=== 2016–2018: Early albums and breakthrough ===
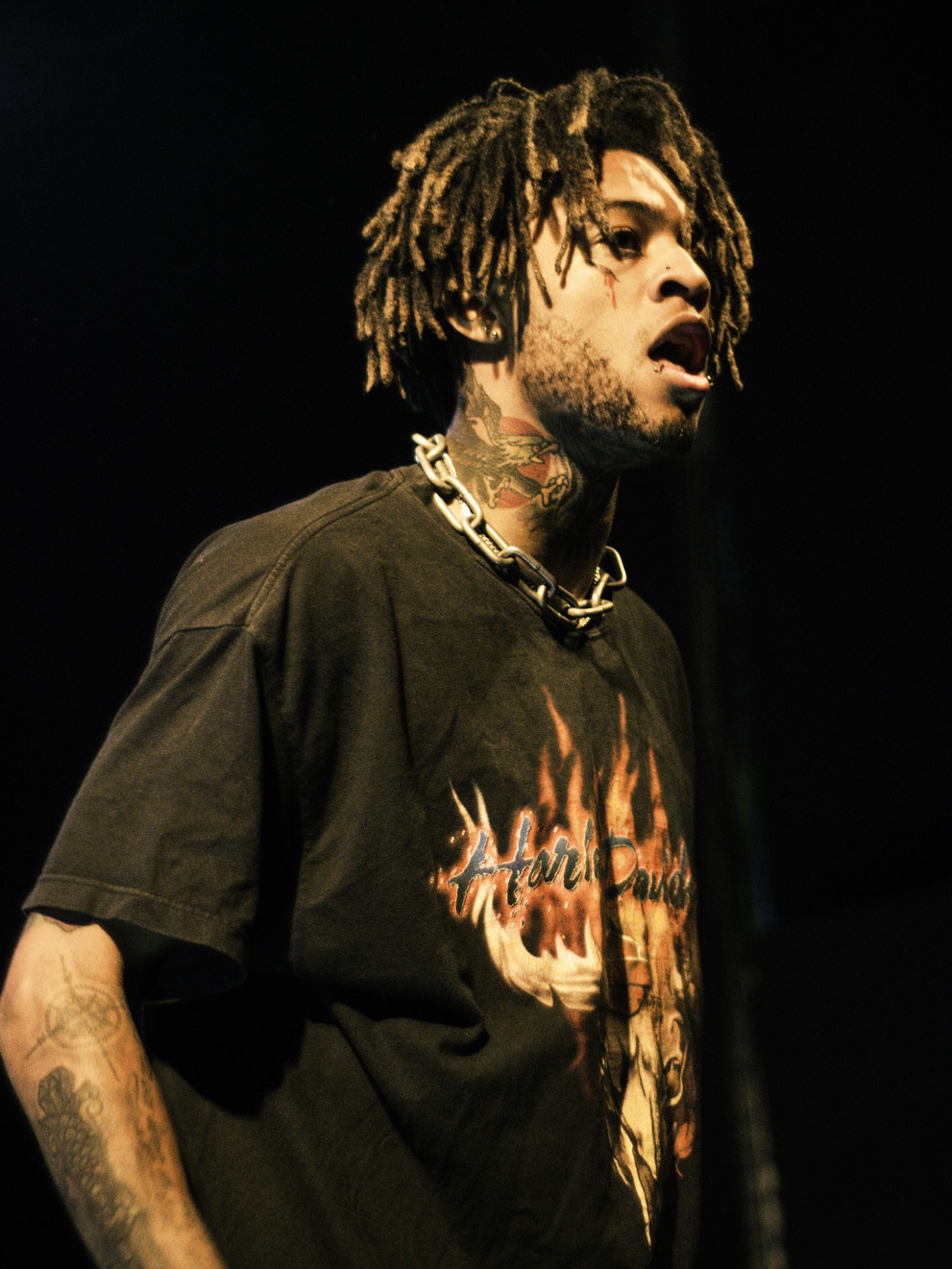
Listhrop performing in 2018

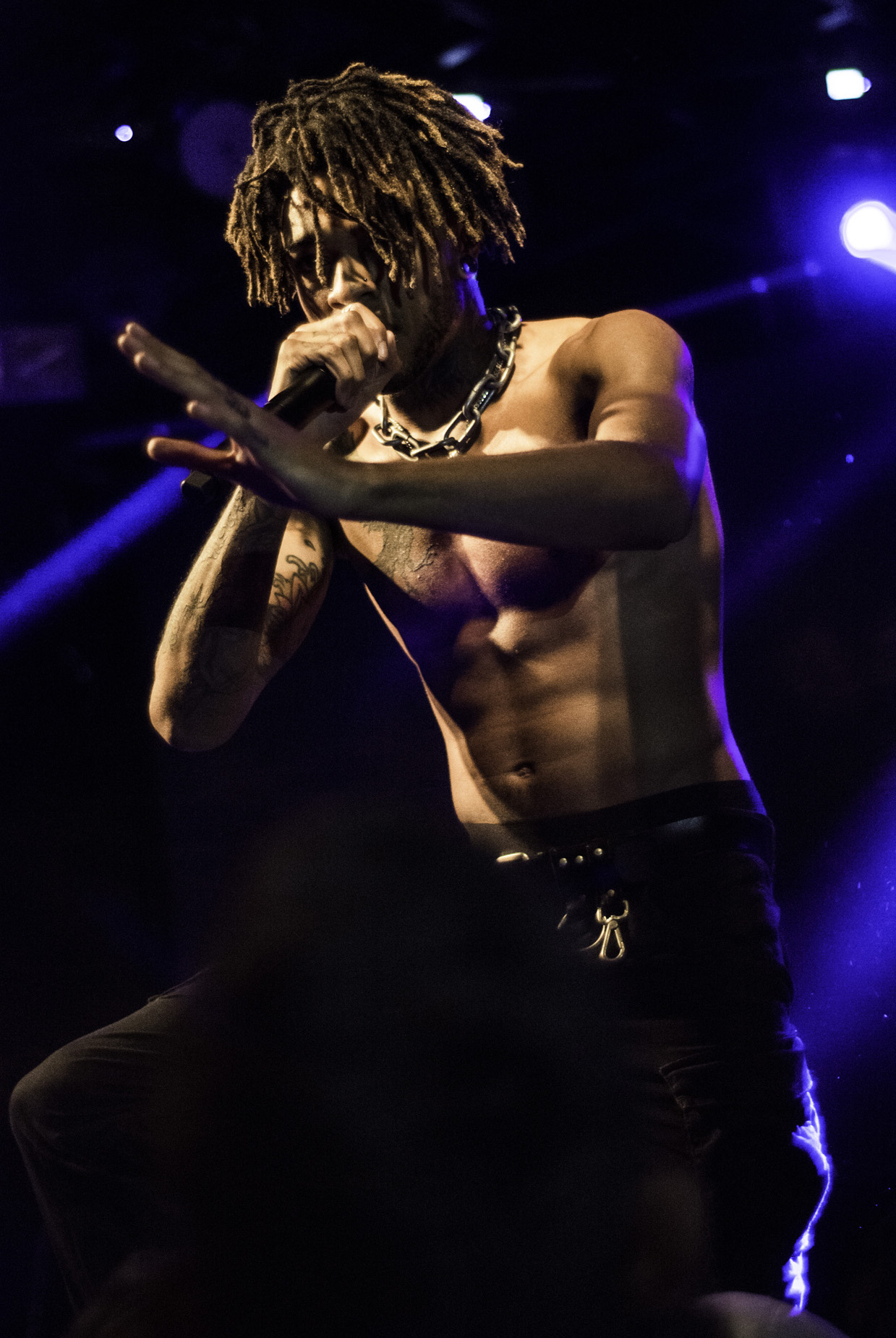
Listhrop performing in 2018

In August 2016, Scarlxrd debuted his new moniker with the release of "Girlfriend". The music video depicts him unmasked and rapping over a "humid, tropical hip-hop track". By the end of 2016, he released two albums, his self-titled album (stylised in Japanese characters as スカー藩主) and Rxse. After the release of two more albums, Cabin Fever and Chaxsthexry, in April 2017, Scarlxrd released the video for "Chain$aw" on 31 May; a week later, he released the music video for "King, Scar". On 23 June, he published the music video for "Heart Attack" and the video quickly gained popularity; he credits his consistency of releasing music videos, specifically the videos for "Chain$aw" and "King, Scar", for the video's popularity rise. On 29 September, he released his fifth studio album Lxrdszn. "King, Scar" and "Chain$aw" were also released as music kits in Counter-Strike: Global Offensive.

In February 2018, it was announced that Scarlxrd would perform at the 2018 Reading and Leeds Festivals. In April, it was revealed that he would be featured on Carnage's second studio album, Battered Bruised & Bloody, released on 13 April; Scarlxrd performed on the song "Up Nxw". On 4 May, he released his sixth studio album and major label debut Dxxm via Island Records.

=== 2018–2020: Continued major label releases ===
After releasing singles from mid-2018 to early-2019 in anticipation of an upcoming album, including "Hxw They Judge", "Berzerk", "Sx Sad", and "Head Gxne", Scarlxrd announced his seventh studio album, Infinity, which was released on 15 March 2019. He was a nominee in the 2019 Kerrang! Awards for Best British Breakthrough. Later that year, "The Purge" was featured on the first season of the HBO television series Euphoria. Scarlxrd released his second album of 2019 titled Immxrtalisatixn on 4 October. He released his third 2019 studio album on 13 December, titled Acquired Taste: Vxl 1. On 19 December, "I Can Dx What I Want" was announced as the official theme song for the WWE NXT UK event, NXT UK TakeOver: Blackpool II. His first studio album of 2020, Scarhxurs, was released on 28 February. The release of his next album, Fantasy Vxid, was split into five EP's, with the full project being released on 12 June.

=== 2021–present: Independent releases ===
On 14 January 2021, Scarlxrd released "Let the Wxrld Burn" via his independent label Lxrd Records, marking his first release since his departure from Island Records. On 5 February, Scarlxrd released his 12th studio album Dxxm II, a sequel to his 2018 project Dxxm. Later that year, he featured on "Dead Desert" by Trippie Redd, which also featured Zillakami. Scarlxrd also released a collaborative EP with Ghostemane titled Lxrdmage. On 29 October 2021, he released his second album of the year, DeadRising. On 13 May 2022, Scarlxrd released his 14th studio album, Acquired Taste: Vxl. 2, a sequel to his 2019 album Acquired Taste Vxl. 1. In August, he was featured on Corpse Husband's single "Misa Misa". In October, he released the EP Psychx with Kordhell. On 21 July 2023, Scarlxrd released his 15th studio album titled Made In Hell. In 2024 Scarlxrd released the surprise EP titled WELCXME BACK: 1 along with 9 other EP's until his final EP of 2024 being titled I'll Be Back Sxxn: 10. On May, 2nd 2025 Scarlxrd released a new album titled Traplxrd being the first album since Made In Hell.

== Artistry ==
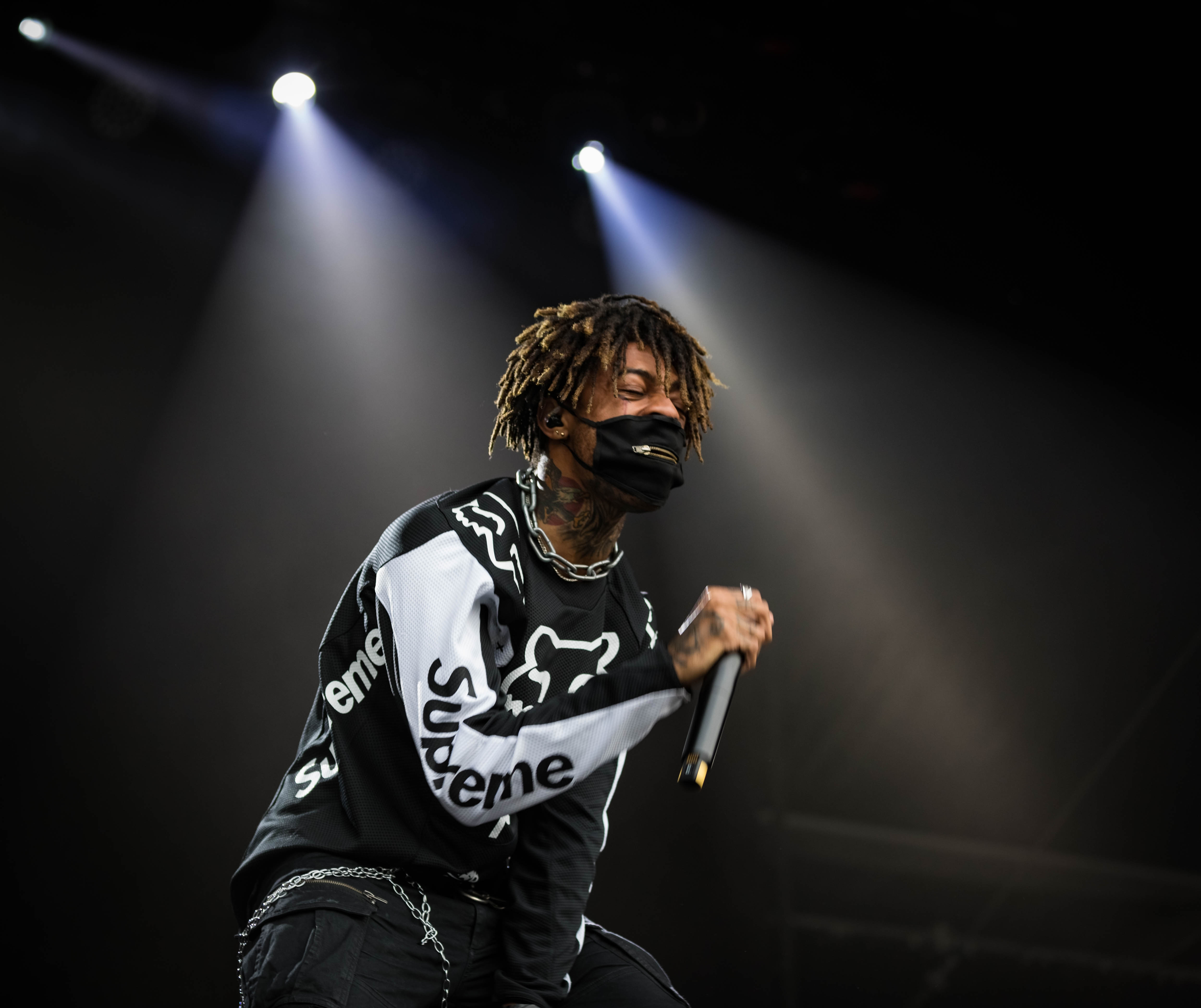
Scarlxrd wearing his signature surgical mask at a concert in 2018

Scarlxrd's combination of trap music and heavy metal has been dubbed "trap metal", a style which multiple publications have described him as a pioneer of. He is often associated with SoundCloud rap artists. In a 2018 article, NME described him as a "tormented outsider hip-hop artist". They also called him a "rap metal overlord" and his style to include "screamed vocals, claustrophobic trap beats and ear-shredding bursts of distorted guitar", as well as calling it a fusion of metal and "nihilistic rap". Scarlxrd grew up listening to heavy metal music and cites hip hop artists including Missy Elliott, Nelly and Eminem as influences. He also stated that he formed Myth City after listening to Linkin Park, Rage Against the Machine, Incubus and Deftones.

He is known to replace the letter "o" with "x", which is shown in his stage name and song titles. Scarlxrd's visual aesthetic within his music videos and clothing style is heavily influenced from Japanese culture, especially anime. His signature surgical mask, which he wears to distance himself from his YouTube image, was inspired by the Japanese manga Tokyo Ghoul. He began wearing the mask less often after the release of Infinity. Scarlxrd also cited American heavy metal band Slipknot as an inspiration towards his visuals.

== Discography ==
=== Studio albums ===
List of studio albums, with selected chart positions
Title	Album details	Peak chart positions
Title	Album details	BG
スカー藩主	Released: 21 October 2016; Label: Lxrd Records; Format: DL	—
Rxse	Released: 9 December 2016; Label: Lxrd Records; Format: DL	—
Cabin Fever	Released: 10 February 2017; Label: Lxrd Records; Format: DL	—
Chaxsthexry	Released: 1 April 2017; Label: Lxrd Records; Format: DL	—
Lxrdszn	Released: 29 September 2017; Label: Lxrd Records; Format: DL	—
Dxxm	Released: 4 May 2018; Label: Island Records, Lxrd Records; Format: CD, LP, CS, DL	180
Infinity	Released: 15 March 2019; Label: Island Records, Lxrd Records; Format: CD, LP, CS, DL	163
Immxrtalisatixn	Released: 4 October 2019; Label: Island Records, Lxrd Records; Format: CD, LP, CS, DL	—
Acquired Taste: Vxl. 1	Released: 13 December 2019; Label: Island Records, Lxrd Records; Format: CD, LP, CS, DL	—
Scarhxurs	Released: 28 February 2020; Label: Island Records, Lxrd Records; Format: DL	—
Fantasy Vxid	Released: 12 June 2020; Label: Island Records, Lxrd Records; Format: DL	—
Dxxm II	Released: 5 February 2021; Label: Lxrd Records; Format: DL	—
DeadRising	Released: 29 October 2021; Label: Lxrd Records; Format: DL	—
Acquired Taste: Vxl. 2	Released: 13 May 2022; Label: Lxrd Records; Format: DL	—
Made in Hell	Released: 21 July 2023; Label: Lxrd Records; Format: DL	—
Traplxrd	Released: 2 May 2025; Label: Lxrd Records; Format: DL	—

=== Extended Plays ===
- Thrxwaways As Prxmised (2019)
- FantasyVxid; Intrx (2020) (Fantasy Vxid Album)
- FantasyVxid; Spring (2020) (Fantasy Vxid Album)
- FantasyVxid; Autumn (2020) (Fantasy Vxid Album)
- FantasyVxid; Winter (2020) (Fantasy Vxid Album)
- FantasyVxid; Summer (2020) (Fantasy Vxid Album)
- LXRDMAGE with Ghostemane (2021)
- Atv2. Act I: Genesis (2022)
- Atv2. Act II: Severance (2022)
- Atv2. Act III: Cxnflict (2022)
- Atv2. Act IV: Prxmise (2022)
- Lxlwut? (2022)
- Psychx with Kordhell (2022)
- WELCXME BACK: 1 (2024)
- NXW XR NEVER: 2 (2024)
- REMAIN UNBRXKEN : 3 (2024)
- YXU WILL HEAL : 4 (2024)
- DIGITAL RECREATIXN : 5 (2024)
- SXUL SEARCH : 6 (2024)
- HIDDEN CXDE : 7 (2024)
- FXCUSED XUTSIDER : 8 (2024)
- SXLUTIXN FXUND : 9 (2024)
- I'll Be Back Sxxn : 10 (2024)
- MxstHated / Sxld My Sxul (2025)
- Bands Cxming In / ESCAPED MATRIX (2025)
- Penance (2025)

=== Other releases ===
- Change Me. (EP, as Myth City; 2014)
- Myth City. (EP, as Myth City; 2014)
- Internet Kid. (Album, as Mazzi Maz; 2014; only available on YouTube, Spotify and SoundCloud)
- One. (EP, as SPRNKLZ; 2019; only available on YouTube, Spotify and SoundCloud)
- HEAVEN FIRE. (Album, as Lucas Hector; 2019; only available on YouTube)
- Practice (EP, as TAKA LXRD; 2021; only available on YouTube, Spotify and SoundCloud)
- Obama Katana (2023; Short remix of 777-777-777., produced for the YouTube channel Smosh as a part of the video "WE WERE ROBBED!")
- BLUDGEON (2024; by MARAUDA, uses Listhrop's vocals from HEAVE)
- fxxl4yxu Prod By Ezrah X Scarlxrd (2025)
- AIWFCIY (Mariah Carey cover) Prod By Walter Afanasieff (2025)
- Ultra Egx Vegeta (2025)
- Paradise Lxst with STVG (2025)
- K1. (Album, as KRXNXS; 2025)

=== Guest appearances ===
List of guest appearances showing year released and album name
Title	Year	Album
"No/Way" (Zoda featuring Scarlxrd and King OM)	2016	N/A
"Up NXW" (Carnage featuring Scarlxrd)	2018	Battered Bruised & Bloody
"Dead Desert" (Trippie Redd featuring Scarlxrd and ZillaKami)	2021	Neon Shark vs Pegasus
"PYRO (Remix)" (Killy featuring Scarlxrd)	2021	KILLSTREAK 2
"Mercury: Retrograde (Remix)" (Ghostemane featuring Issa Gold, Ho99o9, Angel Du$t, Scarlxrd and Juicy J)	2022	N/A
"MISA MISA!" (Corpse Husband featuring Scarlxrd and Kordhell)	2022	N/A
"HEAVE" (Marauda featuring Scarlxrd)	2022	N/A
"MISS ME?" (Kordhell featuring Scarlxrd)	2022	PSYCHX
"The End" (Zero 9:36 featuring Scarlxrd)	2022	N/A
"LIKE YXU WXULD KNXW (AUTUMN TREES)" (Kordhell featuring Scarlxrd and Corpse Husband)	2022	PSYCHX
"Always Want Me" (DVRST featuring Scarlxrd)	2022	N/A
"DXMINXS" (TWISTED featuring Scarlxrd)	2022	N/A
"MOLLY BRAINS" (SosMula featuring Synthetic and Scarlxrd)	2022	SLEEZ MACHINE
"FXRGET MY NAME" (KUTE featuring Scarlxrd)	2023	N/A
"DXN'T LXSE" (MoonDeity featuring Scarlxrd)	2023	N/A
"fake!" (Sadfriendd featuring MUPP and Scarlxrd)	2023	N/A
"BLXXDY NXSE" (Jasiah featuring Scarlxrd and nascar aloe)	2023	3
"Mercy Killing" (Pendulum featuring Scarlxrd)	2023	Anima EP
"harmful" (MUPP featuring Scarlxrd)	2023	N/A
"Rage" (Kayzo and SampliFire featuring Darko US and Scarlxrd)	2024	N/A
"Eyes Wide Xpen" (Kayzo featuring Scarlxrd)	2024	N/A
"Virtual Function" (Darko US featuring Scarlxrd)	2024	Starfire
"CATCH THESE HANDS" (Hekler and Vexus featuring Scarlxrd)	2024	N/A
"GETTING BUCK IN HELL" (Kordhell and DJ Paul featuring Scarlxrd)	2024	MUSIC FOR THE FUNERAL
"running xut xf dxubt" (Øneheart featuring Scarlxrd)	2025	N/A
"Tun Up" (Kordhell featuring Major Lazer & Scarlxrd	2025	N/A
"DEED XF DESCENT" (Nimda featuring Scarlxrd	2025	N/A
