= A New Kind of Horror =

Anaal Nathrakh album

Studio album by Anaal Nathrakh
- Released: 28 September 2018
- Genre: Black metal; grindcore; industrial metal; death metal
- Length: 32:55
- Label: Metal Blade
- Producer: Mick Kenney

Anaal Nathrakh chronology
| The Whole of the Law (2016) | A New Kind of Horror (2018) | Endarkenment (2020) |

Singles from A New Kind of Horror
- 1. "Forward!" Released: 18 June 2018; 2. "Obscene as Cancer" Released: 15 August 2018

A New Kind of Horror is the tenth studio album by British extreme metal band Anaal Nathrakh. The album was released on 28 September 2018 through Metal Blade Records. The album has released two singles, “Forward!”, and “Obscene as Cancer”. The album is a follow-up to their 2016 album The Whole of the Law. The album's lyrics deal with the horrors of the First World War, contemporary politics, and the letters of D. H. Lawrence. Vocalist Dave Hunt stated:

"This is not a happy album. It is bitter, vengeful, sarcastic, sardonic, violent, terrified and horrified — terrifying and horrifying in equal measure. Above all, it is human, and all that that entails. It's as sincere as we could make it. There's a lot that goes into our albums, of course, but it all comes about as a natural result of who we are, and for A New Kind of Horror we felt early on that it was clearly its own thing. It doesn't have to stand in comparison with anything because to us it's in a class of its own."

== Track listing ==
All tracks written by the band.

| No. | Title | Length |
|---|---|---|
| 1. | "The Road to..." | 1:49 |
| 2. | "Obscene as Cancer" | 3:03 |
| 3. | "The Reek of Fear" | 3:20 |
| 4. | "Forward!" | 3:29 |
| 5. | "New Bethlehem/Mass Death Futures" | 3:27 |
| 6. | "The Apocalypse Is About You!" | 3:02 |
| 7. | "Vi Coactus" | 3:43 |
| 8. | "Mother of Satan" | 3:25 |
| 9. | "The Horrid Strife" | 3:27 |
| 10. | "Are We Fit for Glory Yet? (The War to End Nothing)" | 4:10 |
| Total length: | | 32:55 |

== Personnel ==
Credits adapted from Metal Injection:

- Mick Kenney – multi-instrumentalist
- Dave Hunt – vocals
