= The Whole of the Law =

Studio album by Anaal Nathrakh
- Released: 28 October 2016
- Recorded: February – May 2016
- Studio: Necrodeath Studios (Birmingham, United Kingdom)
- Genre: Black metal; industrial metal; grindcore; death metal
- Length: 42:12
- Label: Metal Blade
- Producer: Mick Kenney

Anaal Nathrakh chronology
Desideratum (2014)	The Whole of the Law (2016)	A New Kind of Horror (2018)

Professional ratings
Review scores
Source	Rating
Metal Hammer	4/5 stars
Metal Injection	9/10

The Whole of the Law is the ninth full-length studio album by British extreme metal band Anaal Nathrakh. It was released on 28 October 2016 on Metal Blade Records.

== Background ==
The lyrics to "Depravity Favours the Bold" are based on Au Lecteur (To the Reader), a poem by Charles Baudelaire. The song title "...So We Can Die Happy" comes from an interview with a young Syrian boy in which he said ‘If they want to use chemical weapons on us, they should just get on with it. But can they make them smell of bread so at least we can die happy?’ The album cover is a cropped and blackened version of the painting, Dante and Virgil, by William-Adolphe Bouguereau.

== Track listing ==
All lyrics are written by V.I.T.R.I.O.L.; all music is composed by Irrumator.

No.	Title	Length
1.	"The Nameless Dread"	1:12
2.	"Depravity Favours the Bold"	3:07
3.	"Hold Your Children Close and Pray for Oblivion"	3:35
4.	"We Will Fucking Kill You"	3:54
5.	"...So We Can Die Happy"	4:06
6.	"In Flagrante Delicto"	3:38
7.	"And You Will Beg for Our Secrets"	3:21
8.	"Extravaganza!"	4:13
9.	"On Being a Slave"	5:40
10.	"The Great Spectator"	3:45
11.	"Of Horror, and the Black Shawls"	5:41
Total length:		42:12

Limited edition bonus tracks
No.	Title	Writer(s)	Length
12.	"Powerslave" (Iron Maiden cover)	Bruce Dickinson	6:55
13.	"Man at C&A" (The Specials cover)	Jerry Dammers, Terry Hall	4:10
Total length:			53:17

== Personnel ==
Anaal Nathrakh

- Dave Hunt (a.k.a. V.I.T.R.I.O.L.) – vocals
- Mick Kenney (a.k.a. Irrumator) – guitar, bass, programming, recording, production

Additional personnel

- Andrew Knudsen – additional vocals (4)
- George Liam Flett (Gore Tech) – additional programming (6, 10)
- G Rash – additional guitars (9, 11)
- The Shid – additional vocals (11)
