= Desideratum (Anaal Nathrakh album) =

Studio album by Anaal Nathrakh
- Released: 28 October 2014
- Recorded: October 2013 – February 2014
- Studio: Necrodeath Studios (Birmingham, United Kingdom), The Black Flamingo (Orange County, California)
- Genre: Black metal, grindcore, industrial metal, death metal
- Length: 41:11
- Label: Metal Blade
- Producer: Mick Kenney

Anaal Nathrakh chronology
| Vanitas (2012) | Desideratum (2014) | The Whole of the Law (2016) |

Professional ratings
Review scores
| Source | Rating |
|---|---|
| Metal Storm | 9.4/10 |
| MetalSucks | 3/5 stars |

Desideratum is the eighth full-length studio album by British extreme metal band Anaal Nathrakh. It was released on 28 October 2014 on Metal Blade Records.

== Track listing ==
| No. | Title | Length |
|---|---|---|
| 1. | "Acheronta Movebimus" | 3:30 |
| 2. | "Unleash" | 3:41 |
| 3. | "Monstrum in Animo" | 4:01 |
| 4. | "The One Thing Needful" | 3:53 |
| 5. | "A Firm Foundation of Unyielding Despair" | 3:37 |
| 6. | "Desideratum" | 3:59 |
| 7. | "Idol" | 3:38 |
| 8. | "Sub Specie Aeterni (Of Maggots and Humanity)" | 3:16 |
| 9. | "The Joystream" | 4:24 |
| 10. | "Rage and Red" | 3:30 |
| 11. | "Ita Mori" | 3:42 |

== Personnel ==
=== Anaal Nathrakh ===
- Dave Hunt (a.k.a. V.I.T.R.I.O.L.) – vocals
- Mick Kenney (a.k.a. Irrumator) – guitar, bass, programming, artwork, production

=== Additional personnel ===
- GoreTech – electronics
- Niklas Kvarforth (of Shining) – vocals on "Rage and Red"
