= Vanitas (Anaal Nathrakh album) =

Studio album by Anaal Nathrakh
- Released: October 23, 2012
- Recorded: 2011
- Genre: Black metal, grindcore, death metal, industrial metal
- Length: 37:58
- Label: Candlelight
- Producer: Mick Kenney

Anaal Nathrakh chronology
Passion (2011)	Vanitas (2012)	Desideratum (2014)

Vanitas is the seventh full-length studio album by British extreme metal band Anaal Nathrakh. It was released on 23 October 2012, on Candlelight Records. The album was released in North America on 6 November 2012.

Professional ratings
Review scores
Source	Rating
Allmusic	3.5/5 stars
Blabbermouth.net	7.5/10
Blistering	8.5/10
Decibel Magazine	8/10 stars
Exclaim!	7/10
The NewReview	3.5/5
Pitchfork	7/10

== Track listing ==
All lyrics are written by Dave Hunt; all music is composed by Mick Kenney

No.	Title	Length
1.	"The Blood-Dimmed Tide"	3:20
2.	"Forging Towards the Sunset"	3:46
3.	"To Spite the Face"	4:03
4.	"Todos Somos Humanos"	4:14
5.	"In Coelo Quies, Tout Finis Ici Bas"	4:32
6.	"You Can't Save Me, So Stop Fucking Trying"	3:02
7.	"Make Glorious the Embrace of Saturn"	2:42
8.	"Feeding the Beast"	4:59
9.	"Of Fire, and Fucking Pigs"	3:01
10.	"A Metaphor for the Dead"	4:19
Total length:		37:58

== Personnel ==
=== Anaal Nathrakh ===
- Dave Hunt (a.k.a. V.I.T.R.I.O.L.) – vocals
- Mick Kenney (a.k.a. Irrumator) – guitar, bass, programming, artwork, production

=== Additional personnel ===
- Dave Nassie – guitars ("In Coelo Quies, Tout Finis Ici Bas")
- Steeve Hurdle – guitars ("Feeding the Beast")
- Elena Vladi – additional vocals ("You Can't Save Me, So Stop Fucking Trying")
- Robert "Bob" Mercier – recording ("Feeding the Beast")
