= Hell Is Empty, and All the Devils Are Here =

Studio album by Anaal Nathrakh
- Released: 29 October 2007
- Genre: Black metal; grindcore; industrial metal
- Length: 35:57
- Label: FETO
- Producer: Mick Kenney

Anaal Nathrakh chronology
Eschaton (2006)	Hell Is Empty, and All the Devils Are Here (2007)	In the Constellation of the Black Widow (2009)

Professional ratings
Review scores
Source	Rating
AllMusic	4/5 stars
Metal Review	9.3 stars on a 10 point scale

Hell Is Empty, and All the Devils Are Here is the fourth album by British extreme metal band Anaal Nathrakh, released on 29 October 2007 by FETO Records. The album title is a quote from the first act of William Shakespeare's The Tempest.

== Track listing ==
All lyrics are written by V.I.T.R.I.O.L.; all music is composed by Mick Kenney

No.	Title	Length
1.	"Solifugae (Intro)"	1:05
2.	"Der Hölle Rache kocht in meinem Herzen"	3:39
3.	"Screaming of the Unborn"	2:46
4.	"Virus Bomb"	3:36
5.	"The Final Absolution"	3:55
6.	"Shatter the Empyrean"	3:05
7.	"Lama Sabachthani"	3:48
8.	"Until the World Stops Turning"	2:53
9.	"Genetic Noose"	3:34
10.	"Sanction Extremis (Kill Them All)"	3:33
11.	"Castigation and Betrayal"	4:02
Total length:		35:57

== Personnel ==
- V.I.T.R.I.O.L. – vocals
- Irrumator – all instruments, recording, production, engineering, mixing
- Shane Embryonomous – bass ("Screaming of the Unborn", "Shatter the Empyrean")
- Josama bin Horvath – vocals ("Genetic Noose")
