= Total Fucking Necro =

Compilation album by Anaal Nathrakh
- Released: 24 February 2003
- Genre: Black metal
- Length: 49:25
- Label: Rage of Achilles, Metal Blade Records
- Producer: Anaal Nathrakh

Anaal Nathrakh chronology
The Codex Necro (2001)	Total Fucking Necro (2003)	When Fire Rains Down from the Sky, Mankind Will Reap as It Has Sown (2003)

Total Fucking Necro is a compilation album comprising two complete Anaal Nathrakh demos, Anaal Nathrakh and Total Fucking Necro, and one previously unreleased track from the unreleased We Will Fucking Kill You demo (2001). This album was originally released on Leviaphonic Records in 2000 with only 8 tracks and a different track order. A re-issue of the album was released on June 11, 2021. The re-issue includes a limited edition run of special vinyls, along with a jewel case CD.

== Reception ==
Pedro Avezedo from Chronicles of Chaos gave the album 8/10 in his review. He praised the aggressive nature of the album, also stating that the album was more destructive than Ulver's Bergtatt – Et eeventyr i 5 capitler. However, Avezedo criticized the production of the album.

== Track listing ==
No.	Title	Length
1.	"Anaal Nathrakh"	4:38
2.	"Necrodeath"	4:24
3.	"Ice Blasting Storm Winds"	5:53
4.	"Carnage" (Mayhem cover)	3:45
5.	"The Supreme Necrotic Audnance"	5:01
6.	"Satanarchrist"	5:12
7.	"L.E.T.H.A.L.: Diabolic"	5:12
8.	"De Mysteriis Dom Sathanas" (Mayhem cover)	6:32
9.	"The Technogoat"	4:23
10.	"Necrogeddon"	4:25
Total length:		49:25

== Personnel ==
- V.I.T.R.I.O.L. – vocals
- Leicia – bass
- Irrumator – all other instruments
