= Endarkenment =

Anaal Nathrakh album

Studio album by Anaal Nathrakh
- Released: 2 October 2020
- Genres: Black metal; grindcore; industrial metal; death metal
- Length: 41:04
- Label: Metal Blade
- Producer: Mick Kenney

Anaal Nathrakh chronology
A New Kind of Horror (2018)	Endarkenment (2020)

Endarkenment is the eleventh studio album by British extreme metal band Anaal Nathrakh. The album was released on 2 October 2020, through Metal Blade Records. Two singles were released from the album: "Endarkenment" and "The Age of Starlight Ends". The music was recorded in Mick Kenney's studio in southern California, while the vocals were recorded in the band's home town of Birmingham, UK. Vocalist Dave Hunt said of the album, "I think in terms of feel, it's brighter, more open and direct than maybe we've been in the past. Obviously I don't mean it's happy-go-lucky sounding, or suggestive of a sunny disposition. I mean something more like it burns with light rather than glowers with darkness. It's coruscating." Most of the music was written by Kenney in less than a week.

The title of the album is intended to represent an inversion of enlightenment values, with Hunt saying that in recent years many people have become less accepting of facts, and instead conflate them with their feelings, citing Brexit and the blacklisting of Sam Harris as examples. Additionally, Hunt has stated that criticism of religion has become less acceptable, and that those advocating a silencing of speech are paradoxically thinking of themselves as enlightened. Unlike most of the band's albums where lyrics are not printed, Endarkenment included partial lyrics and the context behind some songs. The original, uncensored cover art of the album is a picture of a pig's head with penises hanging out of the eye sockets, a reference to the album's fourth song, "Libidinous (A Pig with Cocks in Its Eyes)". Hunt conceived of the idea, explaining:

"The idea is basically to depict the ideal human circa 2020. The idea is older, but the depiction is as current as it ever was. We are livestock, shorn of dignity, humiliated, and blind to the reality of our predicament because all we see and care about is libidinous rubbish. And even when one of us thinks they've found something real and rears up to jab their finger at the air, it's still often oddly fetishised – you can practically see the hard on and smell the groin sweat. And all too frequently, we who observe feel that, as the saying goes, 'the stupid, it burns'. Bill Hicks once talked about culture as a sedative or diversionary tactic – 'Go back to sleep, America…'. Zappa said something similar via the metaphor of cheese. The take implicit in our cover art for 'Endarkenment' is similar, but more aggressive and embittered. As the line in one of the songs on the album goes, 'pigs with cocks in our eyes, masturbating to the end of the world'."

== Track listing ==
No.	Title	Length
1.	"Endarkenment"	3:55
2.	"Thus, Always, to Tyrants"	2:32
3.	"The Age of Starlight Ends"	4:33
4.	"Libidinous (A Pig with Cocks in Its Eyes)"	4:20
5.	"Beyond Words"	3:32
6.	"Feeding the Death Machine"	3:35
7.	"Create Art, Though the World May Perish"	4:51
8.	"Singularity"	4:38
9.	"Punish Them"	3:37
10.	"Requiem"	5:31
Total length:		41:04

== Personnel ==
- Mick Kenney (Irrumator) – guitars, bass, drums, drum programming, programming
- Dave Hunt (V.I.T.R.I.O.L. [Visita Interiora Terræ Rectificando Invenies Occultum Lapidem]) – vocals
