= Dave Hunt (musician) =

British singer

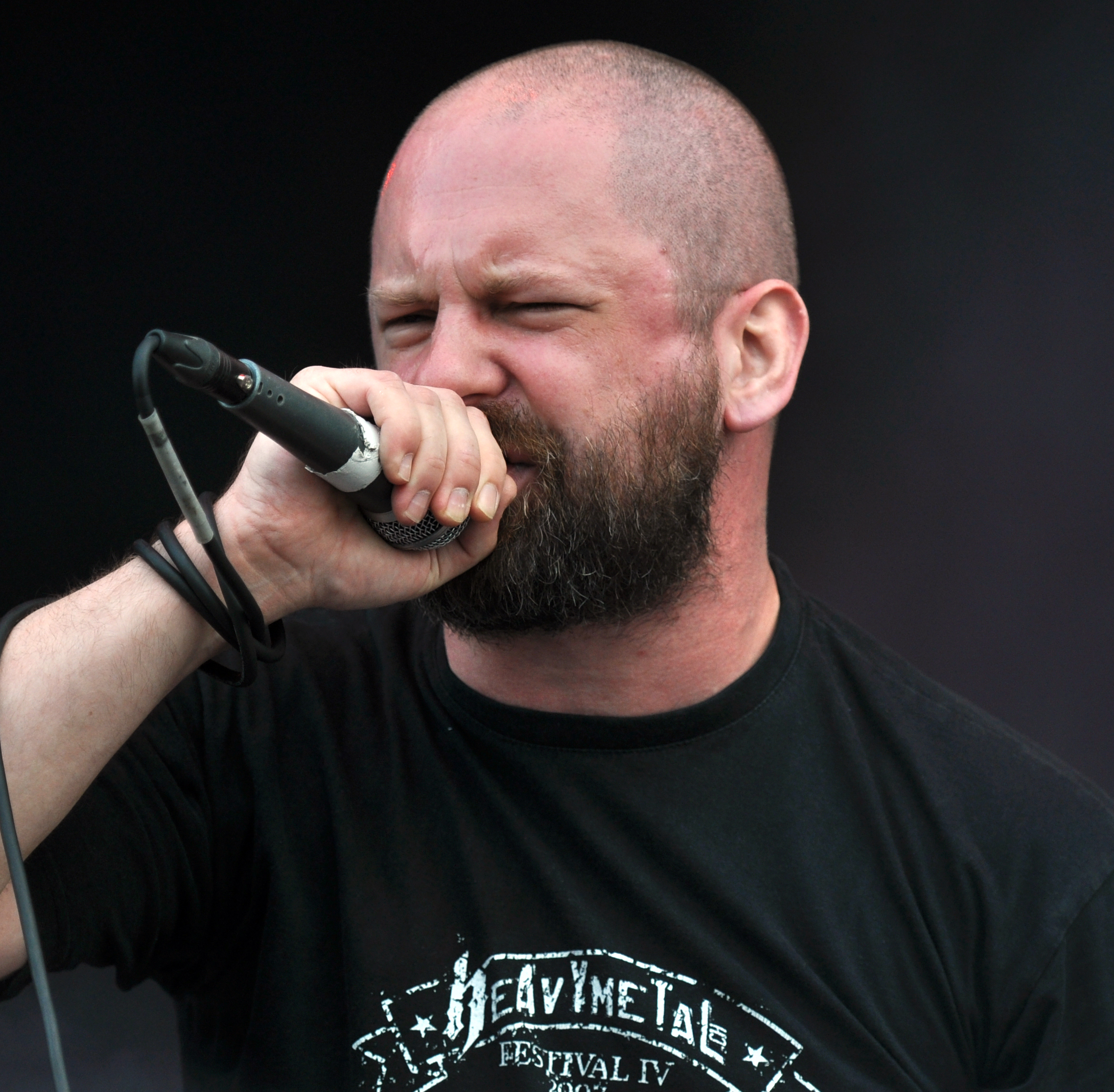
- Hunt performing in 2013

Background information
- Born: Solihull, West Midlands, England
- Genres: Extreme metal; thrash metal; industrial
- Occupation: Singer
- Years active: 1997–present

Dave Hunt is an English extreme metal vocalist. He is the vocalist of Anaal Nathrakh under the pseudonym V.I.T.R.I.O.L. (Note: Latin: Visita Interiora Terræ Rectificando Invenies Occultum Lapidem, lit. 'Visit the interior of the earth, and by rectifying, you will discover the hidden stone', a phrase found in alchemical literature which purports to be the origin of the name of vitriol.) Hunt was also the vocalist of Mistress under the pseudonym Dave Cunt until their split in March 2008. Notably, Dave Hunt's lyrics for his main band, Anaal Nathrakh, are never released or published in album liner notes. The one known exception is the song "Tod Huetet Uebel" from Passion, which was written as a collaboration with Rainer Landfermann, best known for his vocal work on the Bethlehem album Dictius Te Necare.

As of late 2011, Hunt writes an online column for Terrorizer magazine entitled 'More of Fire than Blog', a play on an Anaal Nathrakh song/video title from the album In the Constellation of the Black Widow.

For most of the 2010s, Hunt was studying part-time towards a PhD in philosophy, in the area of metaethics. His thesis advisor was Jussi Suikkanen, and he finished in March 2020.

== Discography ==
With Anaal Nathrakh

- The Codex Necro (2001)
- When Fire Rains Down from the Sky, Mankind Will Reap as It Has Sown (2003)
- Domine Non Es Dignus (2004)
- Eschaton (2006)
- Hell Is Empty and All the Devils Are Here (2007)
- In the Constellation of the Black Widow (2009)
- Passion (2011)
- Vanitas (2012)
- Desideratum (2014)
- The Whole of the Law (2016)
- A New Kind of Horror (2018)
- Endarkenment (2020)

With Benediction

- Organised Chaos (2001)
- Killing Music (2008)

With Mistress

- Mistress (2002)
- Mistress II: The Chronovisor (2003)
- In Disgust We Trust (2005)
- The Glory Bitches of Doghead (2007)

With Dethroned

- Dethroned demo (1997)
