= Domine Non Es Dignus =

Studio album by Anaal Nathrakh
- Released: 2 November 2004
- Genre: Black metal, grindcore
- Length: 41:22
- Label: Season of Mist
- Producer: Mick Kenney

Anaal Nathrakh chronology
When Fire Rains Down from the Sky, Mankind Will Reap as It Has Sown (2003)	Domine Non Es Dignus (2004)	Eschaton (2006)

Domine Non Es Dignus is the second studio album by British extreme metal group Anaal Nathrakh. It was released on 2 November 2004. The title translates to "Lord, you are not worthy" in Latin.

== Background ==
The title "Rage, Rage Against the Dying of the Light" comes from the Dylan Thomas poem "Do not go gentle into that good night". The album features sound samples from films such as Hellraiser ("Revaluation of All Values …") and 1984 ("Do Not Speak"). The title "Procreation of the Wretched" is a tribute to Celtic Frost and their track "Procreation of the Wicked". The title "Revaluation of All Values …" is in reference to the transvaluation of all values (Umwertung aller Werte), a central concept in the philosophical project of German philosopher Friedrich Nietzsche, which includes reevaluating humility and poverty as being virtuous in value systems such as Christianity.

== Track listing ==
All tracks are written by Anaal Nathrakh

No.	Title	Length
1.	"I Wish I Could Vomit Blood on You… …People"	1:51
2.	"The Oblivion Gene"	3:06
3.	"Do Not Speak"	5:33
4.	"Procreation of the Wretched"	4:35
5.	"To Err Is Human, to Dream – Futile"	3:47
6.	"Revaluation of All Values (Tractatus Alogico Misanthropicus)"	4:49
7.	"The Final Destruction of Dignity (Die letzten Tage der Menschheit)"	3:33
8.	"Swallow the World"	3:59
9.	"This Cannot Be the End"	6:24
10.	"Rage, Rage Against the Dying of the Light"	4:25
Total length:		41:22

== Personnel ==
- V.I.T.R.I.O.L. – vocals
- Irrumator – all instruments
- Ventnor – guitar, vocals
- Paul F – vomit
