= Ryan Celsius =

American music curator and YouTuber

- Occupations: Music curator; disc jockey; video artist; music producer; YouTuber

YouTube information
- Channel: RyanCelsius° Sounds
- Years active: 2011–present
- Genre: Music
- Subscribers: 620 thousand
- Views: 217.1 million
- Last updated: July 16, 2026

Ryan Celsius (stylized as R y a n C e l s i u s °) is the pseudonym of a Washington, D.C.–based music curator, disc jockey, video artist, music producer and YouTuber.

His YouTube channel features visual mixtapes, combining underground hip hop, phonk and lo-fi tracks with nostalgic anime and movie visuals. Trappin in Japan, which began in 2017, is among the channel's most popular series.

== Career ==
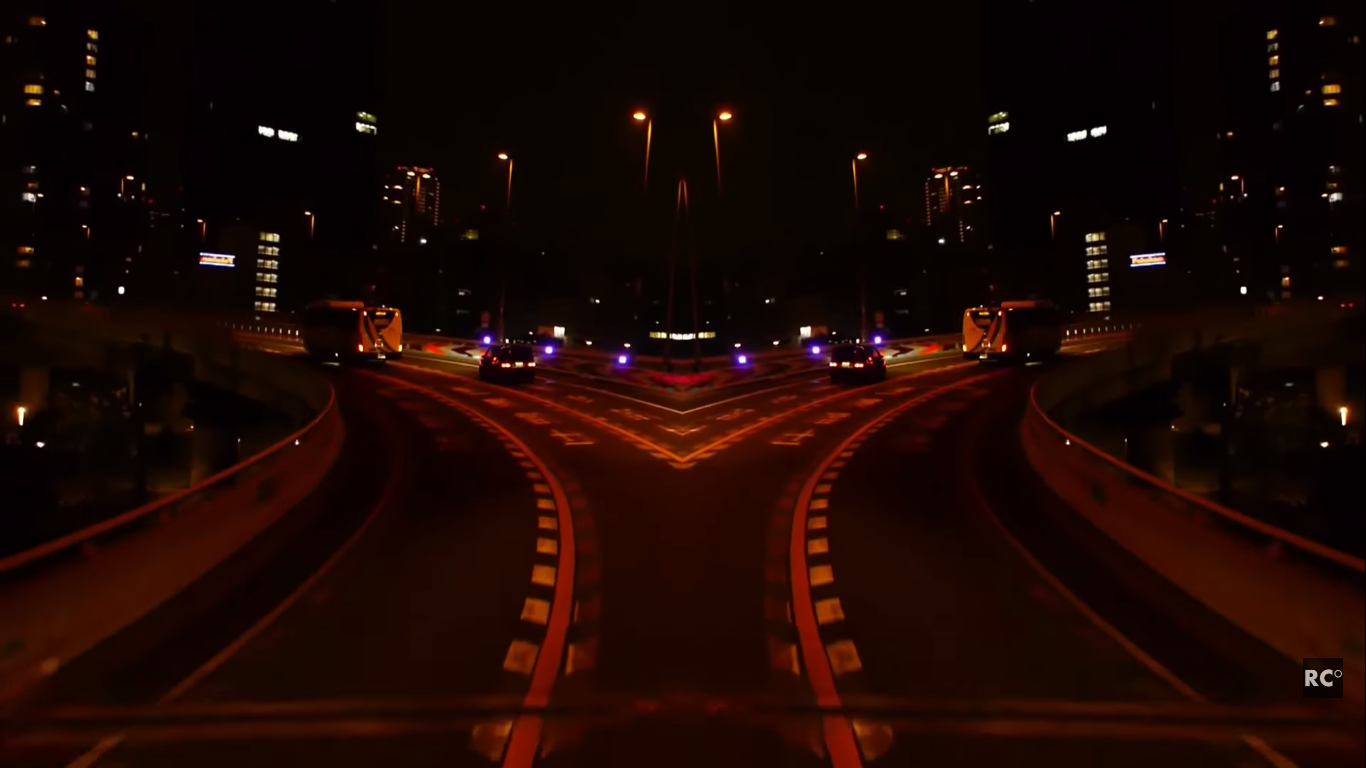
Screenshot of a Ryan Celsius YouTube video, showing a first-person perspective of a Japanese highway

Based in Washington, D.C., Ryan Celsius began producing music and making videos in 2005. The same year, his production hardware was stolen, and he lost all the music and videos created. Celsius stated that the event made him stop producing music for eight years.

In the early 2010s, Celsius got interested in the vaporwave culture, including vaportrap and simpsonwave. He opened his YouTube channel in 2011 as a "personal project". The channel's video mixtapes combine underground phonk, trap and hip hop music with nostalgic visuals from popular anime clips and movies. Most of Celsius' tracks come from independent artists.

The Trappin in Japan series, which began in 2017, is among the channel's most popular, featuring visual mixtapes with first-person footage of people driving or walking through Japanese streets, coupled with clips from nostalgic films such as Akira, and imagery from The Simpsons. He cites YouTube channel Emotional Tokyo as an inspiration for the series. The series, among others, was key to popularizing the phonk genre. Celsius' channel also holds 24/7 live streams of visual mixtapes.

In January 2019, Celsius was hired by indie record label Amuse to build their lo-fi music division. In summer 2019, Celsius' YouTube channel was demonetized and several videos were "shadow banned" due to "misleading thumbnails" in his videos. Celsius stated: "the YouTube policy team cannot understand the link between Japan, trap music, anime, The Simpsons, so since they don't understand my content it must be misleading".

In 2020, Celsius worked with Westbrook Media to create a lo-fi mixtape for Will Smith's YouTube channel. In 2021, he performed with Flying Lotus in New York, and was the visualizer maker for the official music video content of the TV series Yasuke.

== Discography ==
- Marble (2021)
- Golden Hour (2022)
- no collision (2022)
- TYPE 2 (2023)
