= The Codex Necro =

Studio album by Anaal Nathrakh
- Released: 22 November 2001
- Genre: Black metal
- Length: 44:45
- Label: Mordgrimm
- Producer: Anaal Nathrakh

Anaal Nathrakh chronology
Total Fucking Necro (1999; demo)	The Codex Necro (2001)	Total Fucking Necro (2002)

The Codex Necro is the first studio album by British extreme metal band Anaal Nathrakh. It was released on 22 November 2001.

The album was re-released on 24 April 2006, with four additional bonus tracks taken from the John Peel BBC Radio One Session broadcast on 16 December 2003. It was again re-released in 2009, with four additional bonus tracks taken from the We Will Fucking Kill You demo.

== Background ==
The person being suffocated on the album cover is Mick Kenney's younger brother. The album features sound samples from films such as Event Horizon, Excalibur, The Legend of Hell House, Omen III: The Final Conflict and Platoon. The 2006 re-release features the first ever live performance of "The Oblivion Gene", later to appear in its full re-recorded form on the subsequent album Domine Non Es Dignus. The title "Human, All Too Fucking Human" is a reference to Friedrich Nietzsche's philosophical text Human, All Too Human (Menschliches, Allzumenschliches, 1878).

== Reception ==
Professional ratings
Review scores
Source	Rating
Allmusic	4.5/5 stars

Upon its release, The Codex Necro received positive reviews and numerous "album of the month" awards from various publications, and in 2009 and 2010 appeared in several notable "albums of the decade" lists, such as the Terrorizer Critics' "Albums of the Decade", Decibel's "100 Albums of the Decade", and "The Decade's Best Metal" on avclub.com. In 2013, Decibel ranked it at number 54 on its list of the Top 100 Black Metal Albums of All Time.

== Track listing ==
No.	Title	Length
1.	"The Supreme Necrotic Audnance"	4:43
2.	"When Humanity Is Cancer"	5:19
3.	"Submission Is for the Weak"	5:16
4.	"Pandemonic Hyperblast"	3:52
5.	"Paradigm Shift – Annihilation"	6:07
6.	"The Technogoat"	4:38
7.	"Incipid Flock"	5:22
8.	"Human, All Too Fucking Human"	4:48
9.	"The Codex Necro"	6:07
Total length:		44:45

Bonus live tracks on 2006 re-release
No.	Title	Length
10.	"Pandemonic Hyperblast"	3:18
11.	"How the Angels Fly In (We Can Never Be Forgiven)"	2:48
12.	"Submission Is for the Weak"	4:58
13.	"The Oblivion Gene"	2:59
Total length:		58:48

Bonus 1999 demo tracks on 2009 re-release
No.	Title	Length
10.	"Necrogeddon"	4:20
11.	"Pandemonic Hyperblast"	3:15
12.	"The Codex Necro"	5:11
13.	"When Humanity Is Cancer"	4:29
Total length:		62:00

== Personnel ==
- V.I.T.R.I.O.L. – vocals
- Irrumator – all instruments

=== Production ===
- Anaal Nathrakh – arrangement, production, recording, engineering, audio mixing
