= Murder in My Mind (song) =

2022 single by Kordhell

Single by Kordhell

from the album A MILLION WAYS TO MURDER
- Released: 21 January 2022
- Genre: Drift phonk
- Length: 2:25
- Label: Black 17 Media

Kordhell singles chronology
"Live Another Day" (2021)	"Murder in My Mind" (2022)	"To Hell and Back" (2022)

"Murder in My Mind" is a song by drift phonk artist Kordhell. It was released as a single on 21 January 2022, and charted internationally later in the year, reaching the top 10 of the US Hot Dance/Electronic Songs chart in September 2022.

== Charts ==
=== Weekly charts ===
Weekly chart performance for "Murder in My Mind"
Chart (2022–2023)	Peak position
Austria (Ö3 Austria Top 40)	56
Canada (Canadian Hot 100)	93
Germany (GfK)	69
Global 200 (Billboard)	113
Ireland (IRMA)	76
Lithuania (AGATA)	37
Sweden (Sverigetopplistan)	92
Switzerland (Schweizer Hitparade)	98
UK Singles (Official Charts)	83
US Hot Dance/Electronic Songs (Billboard)	7

=== Year-end charts ===
2022 year-end chart performance for "Murder in My Mind"
Chart (2022)	Position
US Hot Dance/Electronic Songs (Billboard)	24

2023 year-end chart performance for "Murder in My Mind"
Chart (2023)	Position
US Hot Dance/Electronic Songs (Billboard)	36

== Certifications ==
Certifications for "Murder in My Mind"
Region	Certification	Certified units/sales
Denmark (IFPI Danmark)	Gold	45,000^{‡}
France (SNEP)	Gold	100,000^{‡}
Italy (FIMI)	Gold	50,000^{‡}
Mexico (AMPROFON)	Platinum	140,000^{‡}
New Zealand (RMNZ)	Platinum	30,000^{‡}
Norway (IFPI Norway)	Gold	30,000^{‡}
Poland (ZPAV)	2× Platinum	100,000^{‡}
Spain (Promusicae)	Gold	30,000^{‡}
United Kingdom (BPI)	Silver	200,000^{‡}
United States (RIAA)	Platinum	1,000,000^{‡}
Streaming
Greece (IFPI Greece)	Gold	1,000,000^{†}
^{‡} Sales+streaming figures based on certification alone.^{†} Streaming-only figures based on certification alone.

== See also ==
- "Metamorphosis", a 2021 song by Interworld
- "Close Eyes", a 2021 song by DVRST
