= Anaal Nathrakh =

British extreme metal band

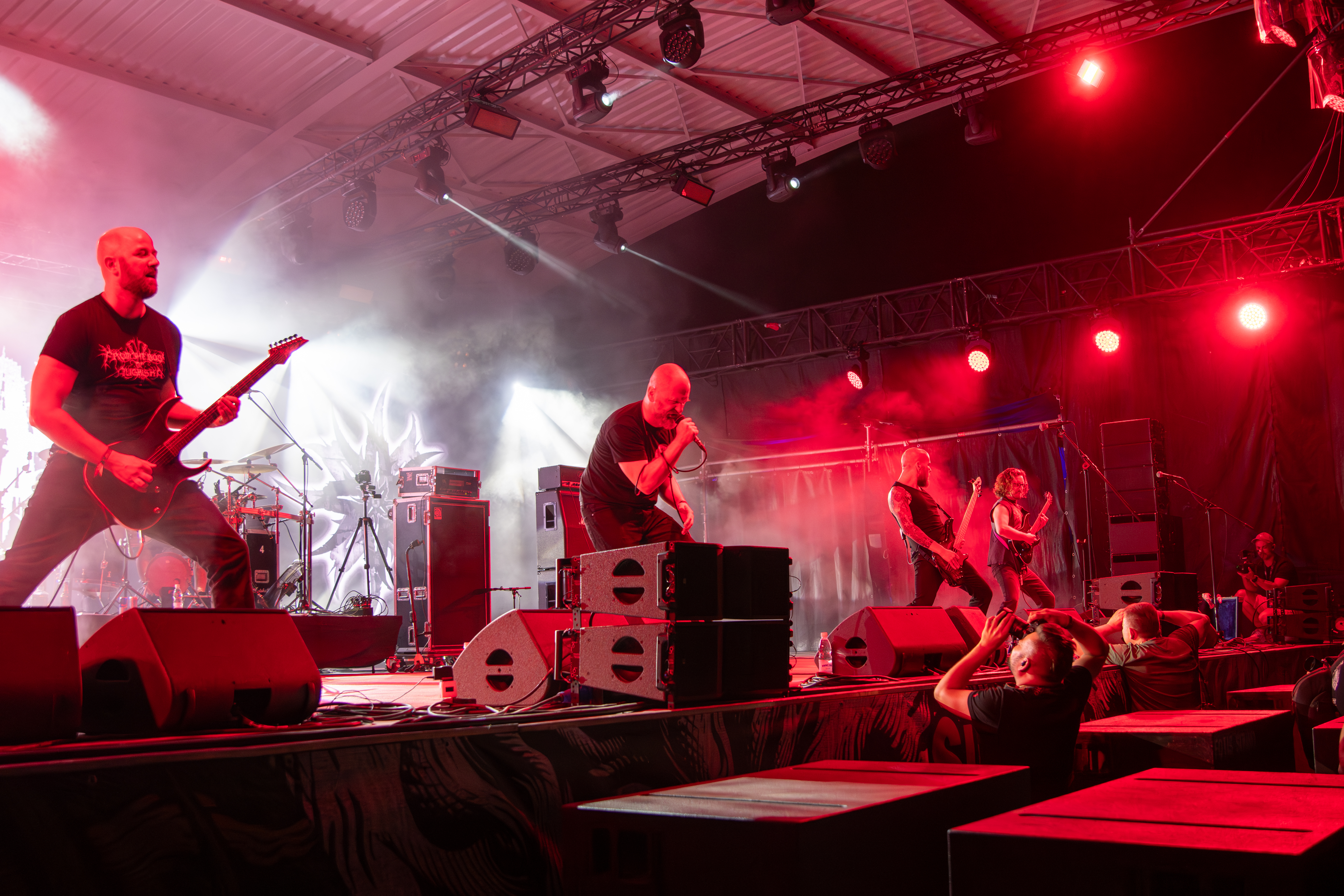
- Anaal Nathrakh, Summer Dying Loud 2024

Background information
- Origin: Birmingham, England
- Genres: Blackened death metal; grindcore; industrial metal
- Years active: 1999–present
- Labels: FETO; Season of Mist; Mordgrimm; Candlelight; Metal Blade; Earache
- Members: Mick Kenney; Dave Hunt
- Past members: Leicia

Anaal Nathrakh are a British extreme metal band formed in 1999 in Birmingham by multi-instrumentalist Mick Kenney and vocalist Dave Hunt. They are signed to Metal Blade Records. The band's name is Irish for "snake's breath" (anál nathrach) and was taken from Merlin's Charm of Making in John Boorman's 1981 film Excalibur. The band recorded two demos in 1999, later released as an album.

The band have released eleven studio albums, one EP, and one compilation album. The band have been praised for mixing grindcore, black metal, death metal, industrial, and other genres.

== History ==
The band was inspired by Norwegian black metal bands such as Mayhem, Burzum, and Darkthrone. The duo recorded two demos before their first full album, The Codex Necro, in 2001, which, according to The A.V. Club, "set a standard of blackened death that still hasn’t been equaled". In 2004, Anaal Nathrakh released their second full-length album, Domine Non Es Dignus, on Season of Mist. In 2006, the group's third album, Eschaton (commonly referred to as the "end of the world" or "end times"), was released. The album featured guest appearances by Shane Embury of Napalm Death and Attila Csihar of Mayhem. The album Hell Is Empty and All the Devils Are Here was released through FETO Records, in October 2007. The album features guest appearances from Joe Horvath of Circle of Dead Children.

In 2009, Anaal Nathrakh signed to Candlelight Records for the release of In the Constellation of the Black Widow. V.I.T.R.I.O.L. stated, "Candlelight have shown a strong belief in Anaal Nathrakh and looking at some of the acts on their roster both past and present it seems they are capable of backing up their good intentions. With their help we hope we can finally get the planet cracked in half", and "Constellation will be faster, more insidious, more ominous, more musically dexterous and wilder than ever before. The album will feature a curve ball guest appearance from Zeitgeist Memento of Mexican extremists Repvblika."

Anaal Nathrakh released their sixth full-length album, Passion, in 2011, and their seventh, Vanitas, in 2012. The band finished recording their eighth full-length album, Desideratum, in February 2014, and released it on 28 October 2014. Desideratum was the band's first album release since signing to Metal Blade Records in June of that year.

The band's ninth album, The Whole of the Law, was released on 28 October 2016. On 20 May 2018, they revealed that they were going to release their tenth studio album, A New Kind of Horror. The album was released on 28 September 2018.

In early 2020, the band recorded their eleventh album, Endarkenment. The album was released on 2 October 2020. Metal Hammer named it the 31st best metal album of 2020.

== Musical style ==
Official band logo

Critics have said that the band fuses elements of symphonic black metal, black metal, death metal, grindcore, and industrial. They are mostly described as extreme metal, industrial death metal, industrial black metal, black metal, grindcore, and blackened death metal.

== Band members ==
=== Current members ===
- Mick Kenney (Irrumator) – guitars, bass, drums, drum programming, programming (1999–present)
- Dave Hunt (V.I.T.R.I.O.L. [Visita Interiora Terræ Rectificando Invenies Occultum Lapidem]) – vocals (1999–present)

=== Additional live members ===
- Dan Rose – guitar (2011–present)
- Sam Loynes (Akercocke, Voices) – guitar (2022–present)
- David Gray (Akercocke, Voices) – drums (2022–present)
- Dan Abela (Voices) – bass (2022–present)

=== Past members ===
- Leicia – bass (1999–2000)

=== Past live members ===
- St. Evil (Steve Powell) – drums (2006–2016)
- Nick Barker – drums (2004)
- Shane Embury – bass (2004–2005)
- Danny Herrera – drums (2005)
- Misery (Paul Kenney) – bass (2006–2010)
- Ventnor – guitar (2005–2010)
- G Rash (James Walford) – guitar (2011–2017)
- Anil Carrier (Binah, No More Room in Hell, Towers of Flesh, Pernicion, The Solemn Curse) – drums (2016–2019)
- Drunk (Duncan Wilkins) – bass, backing vocals (2011–2019)

== Discography ==
=== Studio albums ===
- The Codex Necro (2001)
- Domine Non Es Dignus (2004)
- Eschaton (2006)
- Hell Is Empty, and All the Devils Are Here (2007)
- In the Constellation of the Black Widow (2009)
- Passion (2011)
- Vanitas (2012)
- Desideratum (2014)
- The Whole of the Law (2016)
- A New Kind of Horror (2018)
- Endarkenment (2020)

=== EPs ===
- When Fire Rains Down from the Sky, Mankind Will Reap as It Has Sown (2003)

=== Compilation albums ===
- Total Fucking Necro (2002)

=== Demos ===
- Anaal Nathrakh (1999)
- Total Fucking Necro (1999)
