= Passion (Anaal Nathrakh album) =

Studio album by Anaal Nathrakh
- Released: 17 May 2011
- Recorded: 2010
- Genre: Black metal, grindcore, industrial metal
- Length: 35:50
- Label: Candelight
- Producer: Mick Kenney

Anaal Nathrakh chronology
In the Constellation of the Black Widow (2009)	Passion (2011)	Vanitas (2012)

Professional ratings
Review scores
Source	Rating
Allmusic	3.5/5 stars
Metal Injection	8/10 stars
TheNewReview	2.5/5 stars

Passion is the sixth studio album by British extreme metal band Anaal Nathrakh. It was released on 17 May 2011 by Candlelight Records. The album features guest appearances by Drugzilla, Rainer Landfermann, Ventnor and Alan Dubin.

== Track listing ==
All lyrics are written by Dave Hunt except where noted; all music is composed by Mick Kenney except where noted

No.	Title	Lyrics	Music	Length
1.	"Volenti Non Fit Iniuria"			4:57
2.	"Drug-Fucking Abomination"			7:25
3.	"Post-Traumatic Stress Euphoria"			1:41
4.	"Le diabolique est l'ami du simplement mal"			3:41
5.	"Locus of Damnation"			1:00
6.	"Tod Huetet Uebel"	Hunt, Rainer Landfermann		4:15
7.	"Paragon Pariah"			3:46
8.	"Who Thinks of the Executioner?"			3:57
9.	"Ashes Screaming Silence"			3:56
10.	"Portrait of the Artist"		Hunt, Mories de Jong	1:18
Total length:				35:50

== Personnel ==
=== Anaal Nathrakh ===
- Dave Hunt – vocals
- Mick Kenney – guitars, bass, drum programming, production, recording, mixing

=== Additional personnel ===
- Drugzilla – samples ("Post Traumatic Stress Euphoria")
- Rainer Landfermann – vocals ("Tod Huetet Uebel")
- Barm "Ventnor" Frog – lead guitar ("Paragon Pariah")
- Alan Dubin – vocals ("Ashes Screaming Silence")
- Mories "Gnaw Their Tongues" de Jong – sounds and samples ("Portrait of the Artist")
- Anaal Nathrakh – arrangement
