= Phonk =

Subgenre of hip-hop and trap music

- Stylistic origins: Memphis rap; Southern hip-hop; trap; chopped and screwed
- Cultural origins: Early 2010s, United States, Memphis, Houston and Miami
- Typical instruments: Synthesizer; sampler; drum machine (Roland TR-808); vocals
- Derivative forms: Funk automotivo; Japanese funk

Subgenres
- Drift phonk; rare phonk

Regional scenes
- Russia

Other topics
- Internet rap; cloud rap; lo-fi

Phonk (/fɒŋk/) is a subgenre of hip-hop that emerged in the early 2010s in the United States. The term was coined and popularized by American rapper and record producer SpaceGhostPurrp. The genre is characterized by its use of Memphis rap-inspired vocals, chopped and screwed production techniques, and samples from early 1990s hip-hop, often incorporating elements from jazz and funk.

Phonk draws influence from Southern hip-hop artists such as DJ Screw, Three 6 Mafia, Tommy Wright III and DJ Spanish Fly. During the early 2010s, a number of underground artists contributed to a revival of Memphis rap aesthetics which later became associated with phonk such as SpaceGhostPurrp's collective Raider Klan members Denzel Curry, Xavier Wulf and Amber London, along with rapper Lil Ugly Mane and producer DJ Smokey.

In the late 2010s, a subgenre known as "drift phonk" emerged in Russia, characterized by faster tempos, prominent cowbell patterns, and aggressive basslines. The style gained popularity through social media platforms such as TikTok, where it became conflated with the original phonk sound. By the mid-2020s, Brazilian styles such as "funk automotivo" became synonymous with the original genre and popular online.

== Etymology and characteristics ==
The term "phonk" was originally coined and popularized by American rapper SpaceGhostPurrp, who released tracks such as "Pheel tha Phonk", "Bringin' tha Phonk", and "Keep Bringin' tha Phonk" and his 2012 debut album Mysterious Phonk: Chronicles of SpaceGhostPurrp. In an interview, he explained that "phonk is slang for funk", in reference to the G-funk music genre.

Phonk is directly inspired by 1990s Memphis rap and samples from that era of hip-hop. These are often combined with jazz and funk samples. The chopped and screwed technique is mainly used, in order to create a darker sound. The genre is not anchored to a regional "scene", but the online platform SoundCloud. Notable artists associated with "new-age phonk" include DJ Smokey, DJ Yung Vamp, Soudiere, and Mythic.

== History ==
=== Early 2010s: Origins ===
Phonk took inspiration from trap roots in the Southern United States in the mid-1990s. Artists or musical groups like DJ Screw, X-Raided, DJ Spanish Fly, Tommy Wright III, DJ Squeeky, and the collective Three 6 Mafia all helped pioneer the foundations for the genre to emerge many years later, with the Houston chopped and screwed seen as the precursor to the genre.

In the early 2010s, artists from SpaceGhostPurrp's collective Raider Klan such as Amber London and Denzel Curry, along with rapper Lil Ugly Mane and record producer DJ Smokey revived the Memphis rap sound, which evolved into the "phonk" style. Music curator Ryan Celsius also helped popularize the genre through his YouTube mixes. Phonk producers continued to push this sound in the underground, before the genre gained real momentum during the mid-2010s.

=== Late 2010s–2020s: Development ===
By the end of 2017, phonk had shifted away from the "gritty, dark, Memphis-oriented sound", incorporating more modern vocals, with elements of jazz and classic hip-hop. This stream of phonk has been described as "rare phonk" by Celsius, characterized by "more of a cleaner, almost mainstream trap sound". Between 2016 and 2018, phonk was one of the most listened genres on SoundCloud, with the hashtag #phonk among the most trending each year.

In the late 2010s, a subgenre called drift phonk emerged in Russia, social media platforms like TikTok popularized the style, which became conflated with the original phonk genre. In the mid-2020s, a Brazilian counterpart of phonk named funk automotivo became widely synonymous with the genre. Although phonk has evolved passed its original roots, writing for Pitchfork, music journalist Kieran Press-Reynolds cites artists such as Freddie Dredd and Suicideboys as continuing to release and produce songs in the genre's original style. The genre became associated with doomscrolling, across YouTube Shorts, TikTok, and Instagram Reels.

== Related genres and regional scenes ==
=== Drift phonk ===
A sample of a drift phonk beat

Drift phonk is a subgenre of phonk that emerged in the late-2010s in Russia. It is characterized by the use of high bass, TR-808 cowbells, and distorted sounds, making the lyrics of the samples often unrecognizable. Drift phonk tracks tend to have a greater tempo than normal phonk tracks. Drift phonk music is often used in videos pertaining to the topics of weight lifting, drifting, association football, anime, fighting sports, and street racing cars. Drift phonk songs are typically short, energetic, and have thus found popularity through internet culture. The genre quickly gained traction through the app TikTok in 2020. Most of the prominent drift phonk producers come from Russia, Ukraine, Belarus, and other countries in Eastern Europe.

As drift phonk became popular on TikTok, it surpassed the original genre in popularity; this, in turn, gave the word "phonk" a stronger association with the drift phonk subgenre. Following the rise in popularity of the genre in Russia, Spotify released its official curated phonk playlist in May 2021, which was almost exclusively composed of drift phonk tracks. One of the first songs in this genre is called "Scary Garry", released in 2016 by Kaito Shoma. Mick Kenney, best known for his single Murder in My Mind under stage name Kordhell, is recognized as the first phonk producer to break into Spotify's top 500 most popular artists. Other notable figures include Ivan Belozerov from Russia, known as Interworld, for his Metamorphosis single, and Tahar Bendjedi from Algeria, known as DXRK, for his Rave single.

=== Rare phonk ===
Rare phonk is a subgenre of phonk pioneered by artists such as DJ Yung Vamp, Soudiere, and DJ Smokey in the 2010s. It primarily features drum programming and rhythms derived from styles of 2010s trap music, which it frequently blends with the aforementioned percussion sounds and vocal samples of Memphis rap.

=== Funk automotivo ===
Funk automotivo is a subgenre of Brazilian funk, mislabeled as "Brazilian phonk" outside of Brazil. Phonk is often conflated with funk automotivo. The genre gained the nickname "Brazilian phonk" following its popularization and success on social media. Popular in Brazil, it combines phonk with local cultural elements.

=== Japanese funk ===
Japanese funk is a style of phonk that emerged in the early 2020s outside of Japan, merging J-pop, anime music, and city pop with baile funk, with an aesthetic of using anime characters as cover art. It relies heavily on AI vocals and has grown in popularity on TikTok with songs such as BellyJay's "Montagem Hikari" (based in the Philippines) amassing 14 million views on YouTube and 26 million plays on Spotify in April 2026.
