= Mick Kenney =

British musician (born 1980)

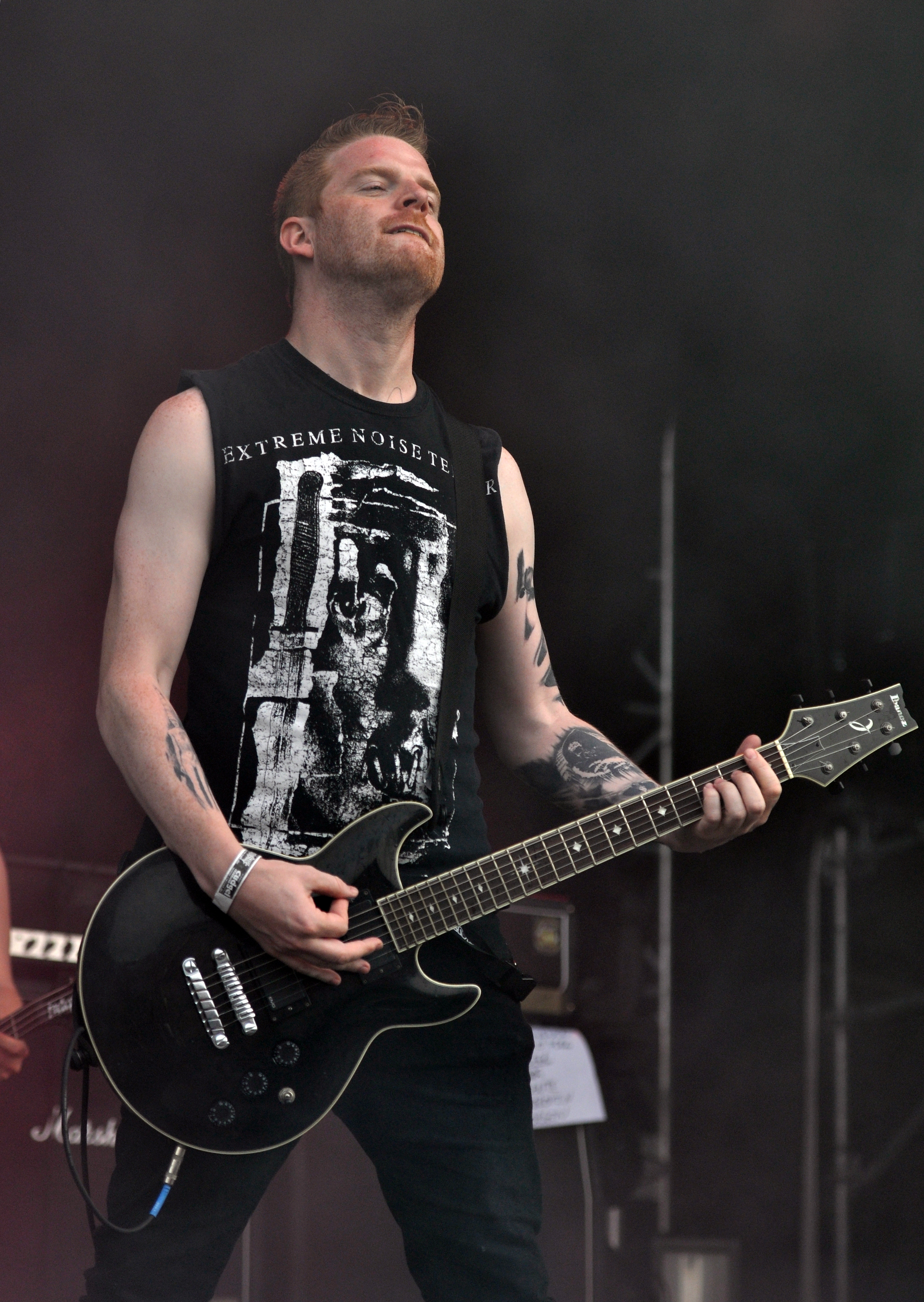
- Kenney performing with Anaal Nathrakh in 2013

Background information
- Also known as: Irrumator; Migg; Kordhell; Officer R. Kordhell
- Born: Michael Kenney; 18 January 1980 (age 46); Birmingham, England
- Genres: Black metal; grindcore; experimental; heavy metal; drift phonk
- Occupations: Musician, record producer
- Instruments: Guitar; bass guitar; drums; keyboards; programming
- Years active: 1998–present
- Label: Black 17 Media

Michael "Mick" Kenney, also known as Kordhell (born 18 January 1980), is a British musician and record producer. He first became known in the extreme metal scene as the founding multi-instrumentalist of Anaal Nathrakh, where he performed under the pseudonym Irrumator during the band's early years and has handled all studio instrumentation, drum programming, and production since 1999. In the 2020s, he gained mainstream recognition as the electronic artist Kordhell, producing drift phonk tracks that have amassed hundreds of millions of streams worldwide, most notably "Murder in My Mind".

== Early life and education ==
Kenney was born in Birmingham, England. He grew up in the city during a period when its underground scene was producing some of the most extreme music in the country, and has cited discovering Napalm Death through John Peel sessions listened to with his father as a formative influence, naming them his favourite band around the age of 12 or 13. He studied illustration at the University of Birmingham, and by his mid-teens was already experimenting with recording alongside future Anaal Nathrakh vocalist Dave Hunt.

== Career ==
=== Anaal Nathrakh ===
Kenney co-founded Anaal Nathrakh in 1998 alongside vocalist Dave Hunt (known by the stage name V.I.T.R.I.O.L.). The band began as a raw studio project, with Kenney—performing under the alias Irrumator—serving as the sole instrumentalist and producer. He performed all guitars, bass, drums, drum programming, and other elements, drawing initial inspiration from Norwegian black metal acts such as Mayhem, Burzum, and Darkthrone.

The duo released two demos in 1999 before issuing their debut album, The Codex Necro (2001), which drew critical notice for its chaotic blend of black metal, grindcore, and industrial metal textures. Kenney continued to use the Irrumator pseudonym on credits through the mid-2000s but later transitioned to his real name while retaining full studio control.

The band's sound evolved significantly over subsequent releases. Albums such as Domine Non Es Dignus (2004) incorporated symphonic elements, while Eschaton (2006) and Hell Is Empty, and All the Devils Are Here (2007) added industrial and electronic textures. Later works, including In the Constellation of the Black Widow (2009), Passion (2011), Vanitas (2012), Desideratum (2014), The Whole of the Law (2016), A New Kind of Horror (2018), and Endarkenment (2020), balanced technical precision, orchestral arrangements, and extreme metal, often exploring themes of misanthropy and societal decay.

In February 2023, the band announced that they had considered disbanding but would continue, and that Kenney would be stepping back from live performances due to personal circumstances. The group subsequently assembled a live lineup without Kenney to continue touring and festival appearances, while he retained his role as the band's sole studio instrumentalist and producer.

=== Kordhell ===
In 2021, Kenney launched his solo project Kordhell, focusing on aggressive drift phonk characterised by Memphis rap samples, horrorcore influences, heavy 808s, and dark cinematic production. He has described the genre as aligning with his prior work in extreme metal, explaining: "Phonk sounded similar to what I was already doing. It was super dark, with almost a horror vibe, but in a hip-hop way."

Early releases included the instrumental albums Beat Tape 1 and Beat Tape 2 (both 2021) and the EP Phonkageddon (2021). Singles such as "Live Another Day" built momentum, but widespread recognition came with "Murder in My Mind" (2022), which became one of the most-streamed phonk tracks of all time, surpassing one billion combined streams across platforms in August 2025. The track charted internationally, reaching No. 7 on the US Hot Dance/Electronic Songs chart, No. 56 in Austria, No. 83 in the United Kingdom, and earning RIAA Platinum and BPI Silver certifications. The track's success on TikTok—where it soundtracked over a million videos—helped Kenney amass over 14 million monthly listeners on Spotify, placing him among the platform's top 500 artists worldwide.

Subsequent output has included collaborative albums like PSYCHX (2022, with Scarlxrd) and MUSIC FOR THE FUNERAL (2024, with DJ Paul), as well as A MILLION WAYS TO MURDER (2023), slowed/remix projects, and numerous singles through 2025–2026. In 2024, Kenney contributed to the official companion EP of Netflix's Rebel Moon – Part Two: The Scargiver, alongside artists including Black Coffee and TOKiMONSTA. His music has become prominent in video game culture, TikTok, and drift scenes.

=== Other projects ===
In 2007, Kenney relocated from Birmingham to Orange County, California, where he has since been based, operating Necrodeath Studios in Costa Mesa, California. The move brought him into proximity with several of the American metal acts he would go on to produce, including Orange County-based Bleeding Through. In 2013, he founded the clothing brand Misanthropy Clothing.

Kenney co-runs FETO Records with Shane Embury of Napalm Death, which has issued releases by Anaal Nathrakh, Mistress (where Kenney performed as Migg), Fukpig (also as Migg), Lock Up, Cripple Bastards, and Ramesses.

Under the alias Migg, Kenney was a member of the sludge/doom band Mistress, contributing to four albums between 2002 and 2007. In 2020, he formed the black metal band Make Them Die Slowly with Duncan Wilkins (The Void), adopting the stage name Officer R. Kordhell. The project, inspired by vintage gore films, has released two albums on FETO Records.

Kenney maintains an extensive production and mixing career, with credits for Motionless in White, Carnifex, Bleeding Through, Dawn of Ashes, Aesthetic Perfection, Eighteen Visions, and others across metal and electronic genres. He has also produced several albums for Napalm Death, including The Code Is Red... Long Live the Code (2005), Smear Campaign (2006), and Time Waits for No Slave (2009).

== Discography ==
=== As band member ===
==== Anaal Nathrakh ====
- The Codex Necro (2001)
- Domine Non Es Dignus (2004)
- Eschaton (2006)
- Hell Is Empty, and All the Devils Are Here (2007)
- In the Constellation of the Black Widow (2009)
- Passion (2011)
- Vanitas (2012)
- Desideratum (2014)
- The Whole of the Law (2016)
- A New Kind of Horror (2018)
- Endarkenment (2020)

==== Mistress (as Migg) ====
- Mistress (Rage of Achilles, 2002)
- II: The Chronovisor (Rage of Achilles, 2004)
- In Disgust We Trust (Earache Records, 2005)
- The Glory Bitches of Doghead (Feto Records, 2007)

==== Fukpig (as Migg) ====
- Nuclear (2002)
- Belief Is the Death of Intelligence (2009)
- Spewings from a Selfish Nation (2010)

==== Make Them Die Slowly (as Officer R. Kordhell) ====
- Ferox (FETO Records, 2020)
- The Bodycount Continues (FETO Records, 2020)

=== Kordhell ===
==== Albums ====
- Beat Tape 1 (2021)
- Beat Tape 2 (2021)
- PSYCHX with Scarlxrd (2022)
- A MILLION WAYS TO MURDER (2023)
- Beat Tape 3 (Remixes) (2024)
- MUSIC FOR THE FUNERAL with DJ Paul (2024)
- SLOWED VOL.1 (2024)

==== EPs ====
- Phonkageddon (2021)
- Beat Tape 3 (2024)
- TRAGELUXE (2025)
- SOUL (2025)

==== Charted singles ====
Charted singles, with selected chart positions and certifications
Title	Year	Peak chart positions						Certifications	Album
Title	Year	AUT	CAN	IRE	SWE	UK	US Dance	Certifications	Album
"Murder in My Mind"	2022	56	93	76	92	83	7	RIAA: Platinum; BPI: Silver	A MILLION WAYS TO MURDER

==== Other singles ====
- "Killers from the Northside" (2021)
- "Glock to Your Head" featuring DeadJxhn (2021)
- "Memphis Doom" (2021)
- "SSN-571" featuring XO1 (2021)
- "Live Another Day" (2021)
- "To Hell and Back" featuring Raizhell and fkbambam (2022)
- "Scopin" (2022)
- "Zep Tepi" (2022)
- "Unholy" featuring Dxrk (2022)
- "Dead on Arrival" featuring Kute (2022)
- "Go Hard or Get Gone" featuring DJ Paul (2022)
- "Fatality" (2022)
- "WTF?!" featuring Sadfriendd (2022)
- "One Shot, One Kill" featuring Sinizter (2022)
- "Land of Fire" (2022)
- "Misa Misa!" featuring Corpse and Scarlxrd (2022)
- "Miss Me?" featuring Scarlxrd (2022)
- "Like Yxu Wxuld Knxw (Autumn Trees)" featuring Corpse and Scarlxrd (2022)
- "9 in My Hand" (Fast and Furious: Drift Tape/Phonk Vol 1) (2022)
- "Murder Plot" (2022)
- "Hellraiser" (Fast and Furious: Drift Tape/Phonk Vol 1) (2022)
- "DAT PHONK" (2023)
- "Vuk Vuk" featuring Dragon Boys (2023)
- "Shoot to Kill" (2023)
- "HOMICIDE" (2023)
- "Bad Man (Kordhell Remix)" featuring Disturbed (2023)
- "lost" featuring Mupp and Leah Julia (2023)
- "BALLE BALLE" featuring RVDENT (2023)
- "HEAVEN" featuring yatashigang (2024)
- "SANTINHA" featuring Bibi Babydoll (2024)
- "Fuku" featuring ZWE1HVNDXR (2024)
- "Glitch Krush" (2024)
- "Revolution" (2024)
- "FICA DE 4" featuring DJ FKU (2024)
- "XEREQUINHA VAI" (2024)
- "JUNBI" featuring anar (2024)
- "K-SLIDE" featuring 2KE and 808iluli (2024)
- "RAVE HELL" featuring killanoia and KUTE (2024)

=== Additional production credits ===
- Motionless in White – Infamous (writer/producer, 2012)
- Motionless in White – Reincarnate (writer, 2014)
- Motionless in White – Graveyard Shift (writer/producer, 2017)
- Motionless in White – Disguise (writer/producer, 2019)
- Carnifex – Slow Death (producer/writer/programming, 2016)
- Carnifex – World War X (production, 2019)
- Carnifex – Bury Me in Blasphemy EP (producer/recording/programming)
- Bleeding Through – The Great Fire (producer/writer/mixing/mastering, 2012)
- Bleeding Through – Love Will Kill All (producer/writer/mixing/mastering, 2018)
- Eighteen Visions – XVIII (producer/mixing/mastering)
- Dawn of Ashes – Theophany (producer/writer/mixing/mastering)
- Dawn of Ashes – Daemonolatry Gnosis (mixing/mastering)
- Aesthetic Perfection – Into the Black (writer)
- Fukpig – Belief Is the Death of Intelligence (writer)
- Fukpig – Spewings from a Selfish Nation (producer/writer/mixing/mastering)
- Aborym – With No Human Intervention (guest appearance)
