= List of UK Independent Singles Breakers Chart number ones of the 2020s =

This is a list of songs which have topped the UK Independent Singles Breakers Chart during the 2020s. The independent record labels given are the ones listed by the official charts.

== Number ones ==
Key
No.	nth single to top the UK Independent Singles Breakers Chart
re	Return of a single to number one

No.	Artist (Note: The artist, single, date of reaching number one and number of weeks at number one are those given by the Official Charts Company.)	Single	Record label	Reached number one (Week ending)	Weeks at number one
2020
263	Sidemen	"The Gift"	Sidemen	26 December 2019	3
264	Tokyo's Revenge	"GoodMorningTokyo!"	Blac Noize! Recordings	16 January 2020	1
265	Likybo	"Kraazy"	Mozzy	23 January 2020	2
266	Dominic Frisby	"17 Million Fuck Offs - A Brexit Song"	Dominic Frisby	6 February 2020	1
267	Dutchavelli	"Only If You Knew"	2Up2Down	13 February 2020	1
268	Lil Pino	"Mya Mills"	D-Block Europe	20 February 2020	2
re	Tokyo's Revenge	"GoodMorningTokyo!"	Blac Noize! Recordings	5 March 2020	2
269	Chunkz & Yung Filly	"Clean Up"	Gazy	19 March 2020	2
270	DripReport	"Skechers"	DistroKid	2 April 2020	1
271	S1mba featuring DTG	"Rover"	Just Jam	9 April 2020	1
272	Tiagz	"They Call Me Tiago (Her Name is Margo)"	DistroKid	16 April 2020	1
273	Rod Wave	"Heart on Ice"	Alamo	23 April 2020	2
274	J Boog	"Let's Do It Again"	Wash House Hawaii	7 May 2020	2
re	Rod Wave	"Heart on Ice"	Alamo	21 May 2020	1
275	Dadi Freyr	"Think About Things"	Klapp	28 May 2020	1
276	Sleepy Hallow	"Deep End Freestyle"	Winners Circle Entertainment	4 June 2020	1
277	Jubël featuring Neimy	"Dancing in the Moonlight"	Good Soldier	11 June 2020	1
re	Sleepy Hallow	"Deep End Freestyle"	Winners Circle Entertainment	18 June 2020	1
re	Dutchavelli	"Only If You Knew"	2Up2Down	25 June 2020	1
re	Jubël featuring Neimy	"Dancing in the Moonlight"	Good Soldier	2 July 2020	1
278	Everybody Loves an Outlaw	"I See Red"	Extreme Music	9 July 2020	1
279	Dixie D'Amelio	"Be Happy"	Dam Fam	16 July 2020	2
280	Curtis Waters featuring Harm Franklin	"Stunnin'"	Curtis Waters	30 July 2020	6
281	John Summit	"Deep End"	Defected	10 September 2020	1
282	Frisco/Skepta/Jammer/JME	"Red Card"	Frisco	17 September 2020	1
283	WhoHeem	"Let's Link"	8PeTown	24 September 2020	1
284	Ritt Momney	"Put Your Records On"	RCA	1 October 2020	1
285	Vedo	"You Got It"	New Wav Music	8 October 2020	4
286	CJ	"Whoopty"	Equity Distribution	5 November 2020	2
287	Fumez the Engineer, A92, Offica	"Plugged In Freestyle"	Fumez the Engineer	19 November 2020	2
288	Ricky Montgomery	"Line Without a Hook"	Crescent Heights	3 December 2020	1
289	Studio Killers	"Jenny"	Studio Killers	10 December 2020	2
290	Juice Wrld and the Kid Laroi	"Reminds Me Of You"	Grade A	24 December 2020	2
2021
291	Mother Mother	"Hayloft"	Last Gang	7 January 2021	6
292	Dream featuring PmBata	"Roadtrip"	Dream Music	18 February 2021	1
293	Wilbur Soot	"Your New Boyfriend"	Wilbur Soot	25 February 2021	2
294	ElyOtto	"SugarCrash"	Elyotto	11 March 2021	3
295	wewantwraiths	"Know You"	wewantwraiths Entertainment	1 April 2021	1
296	Beach Baby	"Cloud 9"	Mom & Pop	8 April 2021	2
297	Silky	"Playing Games"	Silky	22 April 2021	1
re	Beach Baby	"Cloud 9"	Mom & Pop	29 April 2021	1
re	Silky	"Playing Games"	Silky	6 May 2021	2
298	Lovejoy	"One Day"	Wilbur Soot	20 May 2021	2
299	James Newman	"Embers"	BMG	3 June 2021	1
300	Go A	"Shum"	Rock Soulana Music	10 June 2021	1
301	SR	"Welcome To Brixton"	SR	17 June 2021	2
302	Broke Quazar	"Arrow"	Broke Quazar	1 July 2021	1
re	SR	"Welcome To Brixton"	SR	8 July 2021	1
303	Big Red Machine and Taylor Swift	"Renegade"	JagJaguwar	15 July 2021	1
304	PinkPantheress	"Pain"	PinkPantheress	22 July 2021	1
305	Owen Westlake featuring Lloyd Wade	"So Much Love"	New State	29 July 2021	1
306	Shouse	"Love Tonight"	Hell Beach	5 August 2021	9
307	Steve Lacy	"Dark Red"	3QTR	7 October 2021	1
308	Canking & Ess2mad	"Lemme Land"	DistroKid	14 October 2021	2
309	Realestk	"WFM"	Realestk	28 October 2021	1
re	Steve Lacy	"Dark Red"	3QTR	4 November 2021	1
310	Amaarae featuring Moliy	"Sad Girlz Luv Money"	Golden Child Entertainment	11 November 2021	1
re	Steve Lacy	"Dark Red"	3QTR	18 November 2021	3
311	Crawlers	"Come Over (Again)"	LAB	9 December 2021	1
312	Vundabar	"Alien Blues"	Cawk	16 December 2021	1
313	Sales	"Pope is a Rockstar"	Sales	23 December 2021	1
314	Goya Menor and Nektunez	"Ameno Amapiano"	Nektunes	30 December 2021	1
2022
315	Ms Banks	"On My Way"	Ms Banks	6 January 2022	1
316	Jnr Choi	"To the Moon"	Jnr Choi	13 January 2022	1
317	Ajetf/Dc3/Nerdz/Hzino/Hazey	"Lone Ranger"	Blackbox	20 January 2022	1
re	Jnr Choi	"To the Moon"	Jnr Choi	27 January 2022	1
318	Muni Long	"Hrs and Hrs"	Supergiant	3 February 2022	4
319	D.O.D. and Carla Monroe	"Still Sleepless"	Axtone	25 February 2022	2
320	Pheelz and Buju	"Finesse"	Riidiimacool	11 March 2022	1
re	D.O.D. and Carla Monroe	"Still Sleepless"	Axtone	18 March 2022	8
321	S-X and KSI	"Locked Out"	RBC	19 May 2022	1
re	D.O.D. and Carla Monroe	"Still Sleepless"	Axtone	26 May 2022	9
322	Rosa Linn	"Snap"	Nvak Collective	28 July 2022	1
re	D.O.D. and Carla Monroe	"Still Sleepless"	Axtone	4 August 2022	1
323	Eliza Rose/Interplanetary Criminal	"B.O.T.A. (Baddest of Them All)"	Rosebud	11 August 2022	1
re	D.O.D. and Carla Monroe	"Still Sleepless"	Axtone	18 August 2022	2
324	Asake	"Terminator"	YBNL Nation	1 September 2022	1
325	Beach Weather	"Sex, Drugs Etc"	LAB	8 September 2022	1
326	Kordhell	"Murder in My Mind"	Kordhell	15 September 2022	3
327	Rosa Walton and Hallie Coggins	"I Really Want to Stay at Your House"	Lakeshore	6 October 2022	3
328	Jvke	"Golden Hour"	Jvke	27 October 2022	4
329	Cults	"Gilded Lily"	Sinderlyn	24 November 2022	2
330	ThxSoMch	"Spit in My Face!"	Thxsomch	8 December 2022	1
331	Sidemen	"Christmas Drillings"	Sidemen	15 December 2022	2
332	Gene Autry	"Here Comes Santa Claus"	Nasjon Properties	29 December 2022	1
2023
333	Hotel Ugly	"Shut Up My Moms Calling"	Hotel Ugly	5 January 2023	2
334	Oneheart & Reidenshi	"Snowfall"	Dreamscape	19 January 2023	2
335	Lizzy McAlpine	"Ceilings"	Harbour Artists & Music	2 February 2023	2
336	Ayra Starr	"Rush"	Marvin	16 February 2023	2
re	Oneheart & Reidenshi	"Snowfall"	Dreamscape	2 March 2023	4
337	Roar	"Christmas Kids"	Felt Forest	30 March 2023	1
re	D.O.D. and Carla Monroe	"Still Sleepless"	Axtone	6 April 2023	1
338	Fifty Fifty	"Cupid"	Attrakt	13 April 2023	1
339	Jack Black	"Peaches"	Back Lot	20 April 2023	1
re	Lord Huron	"The Night We Met"	Play It Again Sam	27 April 2023	3
340	Lil Mabu	"Mathematical Disrespect"	Lil Mabu	18 May 2023	1
341	Gustaph	"Because of You"	541	25 May 2023	1
342	Victony/Rema/Tempoe	"Soweto"	Encore Recordings	1 June 2023	2
343	Matt Sassari	"Give It To Me"	CR2	15 June 2023	2
344	D.O.D.	"So Much In Love"	Armada	29 June 2023	2
re	Matt Sassari	"Give It To Me"	CR2	13 July 2023	2
345	NewJeans	"Super Shy"	Ador	27 July 2023	1
re	Lord Huron	"The Night We Met"	Play It Again Sam	3 August 2023	19
346	Laufey	"Winter Wonderland"	AWAL/Laufey	14 December 2023	2
re	Lord Huron	"The Night We Met"	Play It Again Sam	28 December 2023	8
2024
347	¥$ featuring Bump J and Lil Durk	"Vultures"	YZY	22 February 2024	1
re	Lord Huron	"The Night We Met"	Play It Again Sam	29 February 2024	8
348	Shaboozey	"A Bar Song (Tipsy)"	American Dogwood/Empire	25 April 2024	1
re	Lord Huron	"The Night We Met"	Play It Again Sam	2 May 2024	3
349	FloyyMenor and Cris MJ	"Gata Only"	FloyyMenor	23 May 2024	1
re	Lord Huron	"The Night We Met"	Play It Again Sam	30 May 2024	12
350	Gigi Perez	"Sailor song"	Gigi Perez	22 August 2024	1
re	Lord Huron	"The Night We Met"	Play It Again Sam	29 August 2024	66
2025
351	EsDeeKid, Fakemink and Rico Ace	"LV Sandals"	Lizzy/XV	4 December 2025	5
2026
352	She & Him	"I Thought I Saw Your Face Today"	Domino	8 January 2026	12
353	Julia Wolf	"In My Room"	AWAL/Girls in Purgatory	2 April 2026	1
354	Long Faces	"Jane"	Long Faces	9 April 2026	2
355	Temper City	"Self Aware"	Thirty Knots	23 April 2026	3
356	Lonown and Riserayss	"Worry"	Arcadia	14 May 2026	3
357	Josh Fawaz	"Like a Prayer"	Hallwood	4 June 2026	5
358	Kyla	"Do You Mind"	Defenders Entertainment	9 July 2026	2
359	Josh Baker and Poppy Baskcomb	"My Place"	Bakers Dozen/Three Six Zero	23 July 2026	1
360	Fat Papi/Prodshushy	"Freaked Out"	Broke	30 July 2026	2
re	Josh Baker and Poppy Baskcomb	"My Place"	Bakers Dozen/Three Six Zero	13 August 2026	1
361	Kolter	"Trapped"	Koltrax	20 August 2026	7
362	Kettama	"Comes and Goes"	Steel City Dance Discs	8 October 2026	1
363	Bôa	"Duvet"	Bôa	15 October 2026	2
364	Faouzia	"Unethical"	Faouzia Music	29 October 2026	4

=== By artist ===
As of 16 November 2026, 19 artists have spent four or more weeks at the top of the chart so far during the 2020s.

Artist	Number-one singles	Weeks at number one
Lord Huron	1	119
D.O.D.	2	25
Carla Monroe	1	23
She & Him	1	12
Shouse	1	9
Kolter	1	7
Curtis Waters	1	6
Mother Mother	1	6
Oneheart & Reidenshi	1	6
Steve Lacy	1	5
Sidemen	2	5
EsDeeKid	1	5
Fakemink	1	5
Rico Ace	1	5
Josh Fawaz	1	5
Vedo	1	4
Jvke	1	4
Matt Sassari	1	4
Faouzia	1	4

=== By record label ===
As of 16 November 2026, 19 record labels have spent four or more weeks at the top of the chart so far during the 2020s.

Record label	Number-one singles	Weeks at number one
Play It Again Sam	1	119
Axtone	1	23
Domino	1	12
Hell Beach	1	9
Koltrax	1	7
Curtis Waters	1	6
Last Gang	1	6
Dreamscape	1	6
3QTR	1	5
Sidemen	2	5
Lizzy	1	5
XV	1	5
Hallwood	1	5
DistroKid	3	4
Wilbur Soot	2	4
Supergiant	1	4
Jvke	1	4
CR2	1	4
Faouzia Music	1	4
