= Cha Cha! Billy May =

Studio album by Billy May
- Released: 1960
- Studio: Capitol (Hollywood)
- Genre: Big band
- Label: Capitol
- Producer: Dave Cavanaugh

Cha Cha! Billy May is a studio album released by Billy May in 1960 on Capitol LP record T1329 (monophonic) and ST1329 (stereophonic). The album features instrumental Latin renderings of big band standards and theme songs of many top musical outfits. Many of the arrangements are done tonge-in-cheek, even Capitol's own publicity described "Twelfth Street Rag-Cha-Cha" as "unforgivable". Further playfulness is revealed in the song "Good-Bye" in which May's arrangement references the Benny Goodman bandmembers' habit of singing "go to hell, go to hell" over the repeating riff. The album was recorded on October 1, 1959, at Capitol Studios in Hollywood. May's experience arranging and performing this album subsequently influenced his arrangements for the Frank Sinatra album Sinatra Swings.

== Track listing ==
=== Side one ===
1. "In a Mellow Tone-Cha-Cha" (Duke Ellington) – associated with Duke Ellington/Count Basie
2. "Twelfth Street Rag-Cha-Cha" (Euday L. Bowman) – associated with Pee Wee Hunt
3. "Artistry in Rhythm-Cha-Cha" (Stan Kenton) – Stan Kenton theme.
4. "The Poor People of Paris-Cha-Cha" (Marguerite Monnot - René Rouzaud) – associated with Les Baxter
5. "Good-Bye-Cha-Cha" (Gordon Jenkins) – Benny Goodman closing theme.
6. "Leap Frog-Cha-Cha" (Joe Garland - Leo Corday) – Les Brown theme.

=== Side two ===
1. "Flyin' Home-Cha-Cha" (Benny Goodman - Lionel Hampton) – associated with Lionel Hampton
2. "Snowfall-Cha-Cha" (Claude Thornhill) – Claude Thornhill theme.
3. "In the Mood-Cha-Cha" (Joe Garland - Andy Razaf) – associated with Glenn Miller.
4. "I Remember-Cha-Cha" (Billy May)
5. "Tuxedo Junction-Cha-Cha" (Johnson - Dash - Hawkins - Feyne) – associated with Glenn Miller.
6. "Bijou-Cha-Cha" (Ralph Burns) - associated with Woody Herman
