= Money pit =

A money pit is an informal term of something that requires continuous spending with little financial return.

Money pit or Money Pit can also refer to:

- Money Pit, a British television series since 2015 where investors can support crowdfunded projects
- Oak Island mystery, a rumoured treasure site in Nova Scotia
- The Money Pit, a 1986 film
- The Money Pit Home Improvement Radio Show, an American radio show offering home improvement advice

== See also ==
- Car costs, expenses consumers pay to own and operate a car
- Cost of living, cost to maintain a standard of living
- Home improvement, process of renovating, improving or making changes to a home
- Housing affordability index, whether a typical person or family in a region can afford housing and associated costs
- Megaproject, an extremely large-scale investment project
- Personal finance, budgeting, saving, and financial resources for an individual or household over time
