= Pope Is a Rockstar =

Song by Sales

from the album Sales LP
- Released: April 20, 2016
- Genre: Indie pop
- Label: Self-released
- Songwriters: Lauren Morgan; Jordan Shih
- Producers: Lauren Morgan; Jordan Shih

"Pope Is a Rockstar" is a song by American band SALES. The song was released on April 20, 2016, on the band's self-titled album.

== Composition ==
"Pope Is a Rockstar" is an indie pop song, written and produced by Lauren Morgan and Jordan Shih. The song's name was inspired by an observation Morgan made in a grocery store, and was not intended to reference religion. "Pope Is a Rockstar" centers on insecurity and the divide between fame and personal hardship.

== Reception ==
In December 2021, "Pope Is a Rockstar" gained popularity on the social media platform TikTok, and had been used on 1.4 million videos at the time. The song became associated with the phrase "Go little rockstar" due to a mishearing of the original lyrics. The song also went viral on Instagram in a trend that involved "cheering for people silently." The trend often highlights personal achievements or milestones, either of the creator or someone they know. "Pope Is a Rockstar" was ranked 22 of 56 best TikTok songs of all time by Teen Vogue. The song was also ranked one of the 14 best TikTok songs of all time by The Mary Sue.

The virality boosted the band's streaming numbers, increasing Spotify monthly listeners from 3.6 million to over 7 million. Lauren Morgan, a member of Sales, said that she noticed "Pope Is a Rockstar" was receiving a significant number of plays while checking the band’s streaming statistics following the release of a new single. The TikTok-driven popularity allowed Morgan and Shih to become full-time musicians. The band embraced the misheard lyrics, expressing enjoyment of how fans use the song. SALES tweeted in response to the viral trend, noting that they liked the alternate lyrics and joking that they hadn’t thought of them.

== Charts ==
Weekly chart performance for "Pope Is a Rockstar"
Chart (2021)	Peak position
Canada (Canadian Hot 100)	89
Ireland (IRMA)	52
UK Singles (OCC)	82
UK Independent Singles (OCC)	10
UK Independent Singles Breaker (OCC)	1
