= Spit in My Face! =

2022 single by ThxSoMch

Single by ThxSoMch

from the EP Sleez
- Released: October 31, 2022
- Genre: Post-punk; Alternative rock
- Length: 2:28
- Label: Elektra
- Songwriter: Carter Filippis
- Producer: Grayskies

Music video
- "Spit in My Face!" on YouTube

"Spit in My Face!" is the debut single written by Canadian singer-songwriter ThxSoMch. It was released on October 31, 2022, through Elektra Records, as the lead single from his debut EP Sleez (2023). The song gained traction on social media platforms. The production was handled by Grayskies.

== Background and release ==
It was originally released independently on November 1, 2022, later re-released as part of Sleez in 2023, The song went viral on multiple platforms. In 2025, the song was certified 2× platinum by Music Canada.

== Charts ==
Chart performance for "Spit in My Face"
Chart (2023)	Peak position
Canada (Canadian Hot 100)	67
ARIA Charts (ARIA)	82
Austria (Ö3 Austria Top 40)	67
GfK Entertainment charts	76
Global 200 (Billboard)	121
Irish Singles Chart	50
Latvian Music Producers Association	7
UK Singles Chart	56
US Billboard Hot 100	100

== Certifications ==
Certifications for "Spit in My Face!"
Region	Certification	Certified units/sales
Australia (ARIA)	Gold	35,000^{‡}
Austria (IFPI Austria)	Gold	15,000^{‡}
Canada (Music Canada)	2× Platinum	160,000^{‡}
France (SNEP)	Gold	100,000^{‡}
New Zealand (RMNZ)	Platinum	30,000^{‡}
Poland (ZPAV)	Platinum	50,000^{‡}
United Kingdom (BPI)	Gold	400,000^{‡}
United States (RIAA)	Platinum	1,000,000^{‡}
^{‡} Sales+streaming figures based on certification alone.
