= Tokyo's Revenge =

American rapper from Colchester, Connecticut (born 1998)

- Born: Garth Andrew Best; November 13, 1998 (age 27); Colchester, Connecticut, U.S.
- Occupations: Rapper; producer; singer; songwriter
- Years active: 2017–present
- Labels: Geffen; The 740 Project; Young Rich Squad; Blac Noize! Recordings
- Website: kyotosrevenge.com

Garth Andrew Best (born November 13, 1998), known professionally as Tokyo's Revenge, is an American rapper and singer-songwriter. He rose to fame with the songs "GoodMorningTokyo!" and "Thot!", both going viral on TikTok and amassing millions of videos on the platform.

== Biography ==
=== Early life and career ===
Born to Haitian parents, Best began rapping at an early age by learning to freestyle at high school, which became one of his hobbies ranging alongside art and video games. He recorded his first song with a friend's equipment, while working security guard and pizza shop jobs. In 2017, he left his home to live alone.

=== 2018–2021: Breakthrough ===
Best began posting his songs on SoundCloud in 2018. In late 2019, Best had his breakout single "GoodMorningTokyo!" from his EP Mdnght (Side B). The song peaked on Spotify’s Global Viral 50 and the Rolling Stone’s Trending 25 at No. 1 and 2 respectively, accumulating 26 million streams on Spotify. The song went viral on TikTok, being used in over a million videos. A music video, directed by James "JMP" Pereira, was released on February 17 with Best joining City Morgue on their Good As Dead Tour on February 27. Another song, "Thot!" featuring ZEDSU also went viral in 2020, aided by a dance trend while being compared to the likes of XXXTentacion. On September 11, 2020, he released the EP 7VEN. On November 27, 2020, he released "nothinglastsforever."

== Musical style ==
Best's music has been described as being inspired by Japanese culture as well as people like Tyler the Creator, Eminem, and Jay-Z. Best's music has also been often compared to the likes of XXXTentacion. When he released Lillium, he explained that the album "leans more into the singing music and pushes a little heavier on the different types of music I can make and how far I can push my voice outside of just rap stuff."

== Discography ==
=== Extended plays ===
| Title | Year |
|---|---|
| Mdnght (Side A) | 2019 |
| Mdnght (Side B) | 2019 |
| 7ven | 2020 |
| Lilium | 2020 |

=== Collaborative extended plays ===
| Title | Year |
|---|---|
| Trapped in Tokyo (with Joey Trap) | 2019 |

=== Singles ===
| Title | Year | Peak chart positions | | | Certifications | Album |
| Title | Year | US Bub. | US R&B/HH | UK | Certifications | Album |
|---|---|---|---|---|---|---|
| "Jetslide '98" | 2018 | — | — | — | | Non-album singles |
| "LetItAtFreestyle" | 2018 | — | — | — | | Non-album singles |
| "YesIndeedFreestyle" | 2018 | — | — | — | | Non-album singles |
| "RoverFreestyle" | 2018 | — | — | — | | Non-album singles |
| "Sinner Pt.2" | 2019 | — | — | — | | Non-album singles |
| "Mdnght" | 2019 | — | — | — | | Mdnght (Side A) |
| "Disco!" | 2019 | — | — | — | | Non-album singles |
| "Darkside!" | 2019 | — | — | — | | Non-album singles |
| "Sinner Pt.1" | 2019 | — | — | — | | Non-album singles |
| "PlanetFitnessFreestyle" (with Bandingo Ygne) | 2019 | — | — | — | | Non-album singles |
| "If U Think This is Abt U it Is" | 2019 | — | — | — | | Non-album singles |
| "Cowboys and Aliens" | 2019 | — | — | — | | Non-album singles |
| "LooneyTunesFreestyle" | 2019 | — | — | — | | Non-album singles |
| "GoodMorningTokyo!" | 2019 | 1 | 47 | 74 | RIAA: Gold | Mdnght (Side B) |
| "Thot!" (with Zedsu) | 2019 | — | — | — | | Mdnght (Side B) |
| "Fresh Offa Route" (featuring Brickboydior and Lil Satan) | 2019 | — | — | — | | Non-album single |
| "Gotham" | 2020 | — | — | — | | 7ven |
| "Bodycount" (featuring Jasiah) | 2020 | — | — | — | | 7ven |
| "Irresponsible" | 2020 | — | — | — | | Madden NFL 21 |
| "Hell Bent" (featuring the Kid Laroi) | 2020 | — | — | — | | 7ven |
| "Talk My Shit" (featuring Brickboydior) | 2020 | — | — | — | | Non-album single |
| "NothingLastsForever" | 2020 | — | — | — | | Lilium |
| "Sorry!" (featuring 24kGoldn) | 2020 | — | — | — | | Lilium |
| "Amazing Gr4ce" | 2021 | — | — | — | | Non-album singles |
| "In the Middle" | 2022 | — | — | — | | Non-album singles |
| "Sacrilegious" (featuring Plvtinum) | 2022 | — | — | — | | Non-album singles |
| "Vitamins" (featuring AJ Salvatore) | 2022 | — | — | — | | Non-album singles |
| "Don't!" | 2022 | — | — | — | | Non-album singles |
| "Vitamins (Kultivare Remix)" (featuring AJ Salvatore) | 2022 | — | — | — | | Non-album singles |
| "The One You Hate" (featuring Brickboydior) | 2022 | — | — | — | | Non-album singles |
| "Ghostrider" | 2023 | — | — | — | | Non-album singles |
