= Peter Byrne (actor) =

English actor and director (1928–2018)

- Born: Peter James Byrne; 29 January 1928; West Ham, Essex, England
- Died: 14 May 2018 (aged 90); Northwood, London, England
- Education: Italia Conti Academy of Theatre Arts
- Occupation: Actor/Director
- Years active: 1944, 1953–2013
- Spouse: Renee Helen

Peter James Byrne (29 January 1928 – 14 May 2018) was an English actor and theatre director.

== Early life ==
Born in West Ham, Essex; Byrne was the son of James Byrne, a musician. He was educated at a grammar school and trained as an actor at the Italia Conti Stage School.

== Career ==
Byrne made his name by playing George Dixon's son-in-law Andy Crawford in the long-running BBC Television serial Dixon of Dock Green for twenty years from 1955. He was Director of Productions for the Bournemouth Theatre Company (1965–66).

Stage appearances included Boeing Boeing, There's a Girl in My Soup, Double Edge, and The Unexpected Guest. Films include Reach for the Sky and Carry On Cabby. TV appearances included Mutiny at Spithead, The New Canadians and more than 300 appearances in Dixon of Dock Green. He also made many appearances in pantomime, typically as the villain.

In 2005, the Dixon series was revived for BBC Radio Four, but without Byrne, though he commented, "Various people have said the series was a bit cosy and the BBC seemed to be a little ashamed of it," adding that he believed it to be very underrated.

== Personal life and death ==
Byrne was married to Renée Helen. He died at Denville Hall nursing home on 14 May 2018, aged 90.

== Cinema appearances ==
- The Large Rope (1953) – Jeff Stribling
- Reach for the Sky (1956) – Civilian Pilot Witnessing Bader's Crash (uncredited)
- Watch Your Stern (1960) – Sailor
- Raising the Wind (1961) – 1st Horn
- The Iron Maiden (1962) – Race Starter (uncredited)
- Carry On Cabby (1963) – Bridegroom

== Television appearances ==
- Dixon of Dock Green (1955–1975) – Detective Andy Crawford
- Mutiny at Spithead
- The New Canadians
- Looks Familiar
- Blake's 7 (1981) – Justin
- Bread (1986–1991) – Derek
- The Pattern of Marriage
- Cinderella

== Theatre appearances ==
- There's a Girl in My Soup
- Underground
- Boeing Boeing
- The Blue Lamp
- The Archers
- Caste
- Deadly Nightcap
- Move Over Mrs Markham
- Run for Your Wife
- Dick Whittington
- There's No Place Like A Home
- The Mouse Trap
- Witness for the Prosecution

== Bibliography ==
- Byrne P: Double Edge, Yvonne Arnaud Theatre Guildford UK, 24 May – 4 June 1977
- Byrne P:The Unexpected Guest, by Agatha Christie, Yvonne Arnaud Theatre Guildford UK, 31 July – 19 August 1978
