= There's a Girl in My Soup =

1970 British film by Roy Boulting

- Theatrical release poster
- Directed by: Roy Boulting
- Written by: Terence Frisby; Peter Kortner (additional dialogue)
- Based on: There's a Girl in My Soup by Terence Frisby
- Produced by: John Boulting; Mike J. Frankovich
- Starring: Peter Sellers; Goldie Hawn; Tony Britton
- Cinematography: Harry Waxman
- Edited by: Martin Charles
- Music by: Mike d'Abo
- Distributed by: Columbia Pictures
- Release dates: 14 December 1970 (New York City); 21 December 1970 (London)
- Running time: 96 minutes
- Country: United Kingdom
- Languages: English; French
- Box office: $4.5 million (rentals)

There's a Girl in My Soup is a 1970 British sex comedy film directed by Roy Boulting and starring Peter Sellers and Goldie Hawn. Terence Frisby wrote the screenplay based on his 1966 stage play of the same name.

== Plot ==
Robert Danvers is a vain, womanizing and wealthy host of a high-profile television cooking show. He meets Marion, a no-nonsense 19-year-old American hippie who has just broken up with her British rock musician boyfriend Jimmy. After a halting start, they begin an affair, and she accompanies him on a trip to a wine-tasting festival in France, where she embarrasses him by getting extremely drunk, but they enjoy their time together on the coast in the South of France. However, when they return to London, Marion makes up with Jimmy and turns down a desperate proposal of marriage from Danvers. Throughout the film, Danvers' favourite line with women is: "My God, but you're lovely" – which, in the final scene after Marion has gone back to Jimmy and Danvers has made a date with another woman, he says to his own reflection.

== Cast ==
- Peter Sellers as Robert Danvers
- Goldie Hawn as Marion
- Tony Britton as Andrew Hunter
- Nicky Henson as Jimmy
- Diana Dors as John's wife
- Judy Campbell as Lady Heather
- John Comer as John, the porter
- Gabrielle Drake as Julia
- Nicola Pagett as Clare
- Geraldine Sherman as Caroline
- Thorley Walters as manager of the Carlton Hotel
- Ruth Trouncer as Gilly Hunter
- Françoise Pascal as Paola
- Christopher Cazenove as Nigel
- Raf De La Torre as Monsieur Le Guestier

== Production ==
The film is based on the stage comedy There's a Girl in My Soup, written by Terence Frisby, produced by Michael Codron, directed by Bob Chetwyn and starring Donald Sinden, Barbara Ferris and Jon Pertwee. Codron said an investor was Nat Cohen. It ran for six and a half years in the West End, from 1966 to 1973, including three years at the Globe Theatre (now The Gielgud), breaking records to become London's longest-running comedy. This record was later broken by No Sex Please, We're British and then Run for Your Wife.

Columbia and Nat Cohen of Anglo Amalgamated bought the film rights in 1966 for £100,000. Mike Frankovich produced the film and John Boulting directed.

Goldie Hawn signed in January 1969. The movie introduced Christopher Cazenove, who later co-starred on Dynasty, and Nicola Pagett, who played Elizabeth Bellamy on Upstairs, Downstairs.

Diana Dors's performance was one in a series of supporting roles that revived her career.

A novelisation of the film, written by Raymond Hitchcock, was published in 1971.

Goldie Hawn was unhappy that she was coerced into doing a nude scene for this film. "It was my first nude scene in a movie and I didn't want to do it. I was getting out of bed and putting on a coat and the director finessed me into doing it nude. There was absolutely no reason on earth for me to get out of that bed naked. Roy Boulting, the director, told me he'd clear the set and he really played on my insecurities, making me feel that it was my duty as an actress to trust him. I gave in, and, in retrospect, it was the conduct of somebody who didn't want to stomp off the set and be labeled as a bitch."

== Release ==
The film had its world premiere at the Astor Theatre in New York City on 14 December 1970.

== Reception ==
=== Box office ===
There's a Girl in My Soup ranked as the seventh most profitable film at the British box office in 1970.

=== Critical response ===
Variety found the film "a delightful surprise: a rather simple legit sex comedy (by Terence Frisby) transformed into breezy and extremely tasteful screen fun."

Roger Greenspun in The New York Times, dismissed the film as "without illumination or wit or good humor or good sense", and concluded "The only performance to praise is that of Tony Britton, who, as Danvers's very much married publisher and friend, achieves a level of sophisticated pleasantness that actually, suggests comedy. Peter Sellers, on the other hand, is at his least inventive. And Goldie Hawn, who I think might be fun in another part, mostly indulges in bad habits with her too-expressive eyes. In fairness, both Miss Hawn and Mr. Sellers are handicapped by roles in which any attempt at a characterization must seem an imposition."

Gene Siskel of the Chicago Tribune gave the film 1.5 stars out of 4 and wrote that Sellers had "his first decent role in several years" and gave a "completely sympathetic performance", but "no amount of humor is able to wake up the film's tired story premise."

Kevin Thomas of the Los Angeles Times was positive, writing "Escapist entertainment it assuredly is, yet Frisby has wisely provided enough quiet moments between his gags to allow his characters to become real enough to care about."

Tom Milne of The Monthly Film Bulletin stated that Sellers was "hopelessly miscast" and that the film "would have been much better served by a straight romantic lead."

The website Allmovie comments that "Soup was different in its day, as the heroine of the piece was not a Doris Day-type eternal virgin, but a sexual being who not only gives herself freely to a man but is upfront and unapologetic about her willingness. The movie has little going for it beyond this premise, and it wanders rather aimlessly, if agreeably, before abruptly resolving its insignificant conflicts."

The Radio Times Guide to Films gave the film 2/5 stars, writing: "This is a very tame version of a sex comedy that ran and ran on both sides of the Atlantic. Roy Boulting directs without much enthusiasm for his tale of womanising TV celebrity Peter Sellers, who is knocked off his stride by a chance encounter with dippy waif Goldie Hawn. Content to cruise through his meagre helping of wisecracks, the miscast Sellers still teams well with Hawn, who also has some funny scenes with ditched boyfriend Nicky Henson."

=== Awards ===
Frisby's script won The Writers' Guild of Great Britain Award for Best Screenplay in 1970.

Goldie Hawn was nominated for Best Actress at the BAFTA's for her work in this and Cactus Flower.
