= Terence Frisby =

British writer (1932–2020)

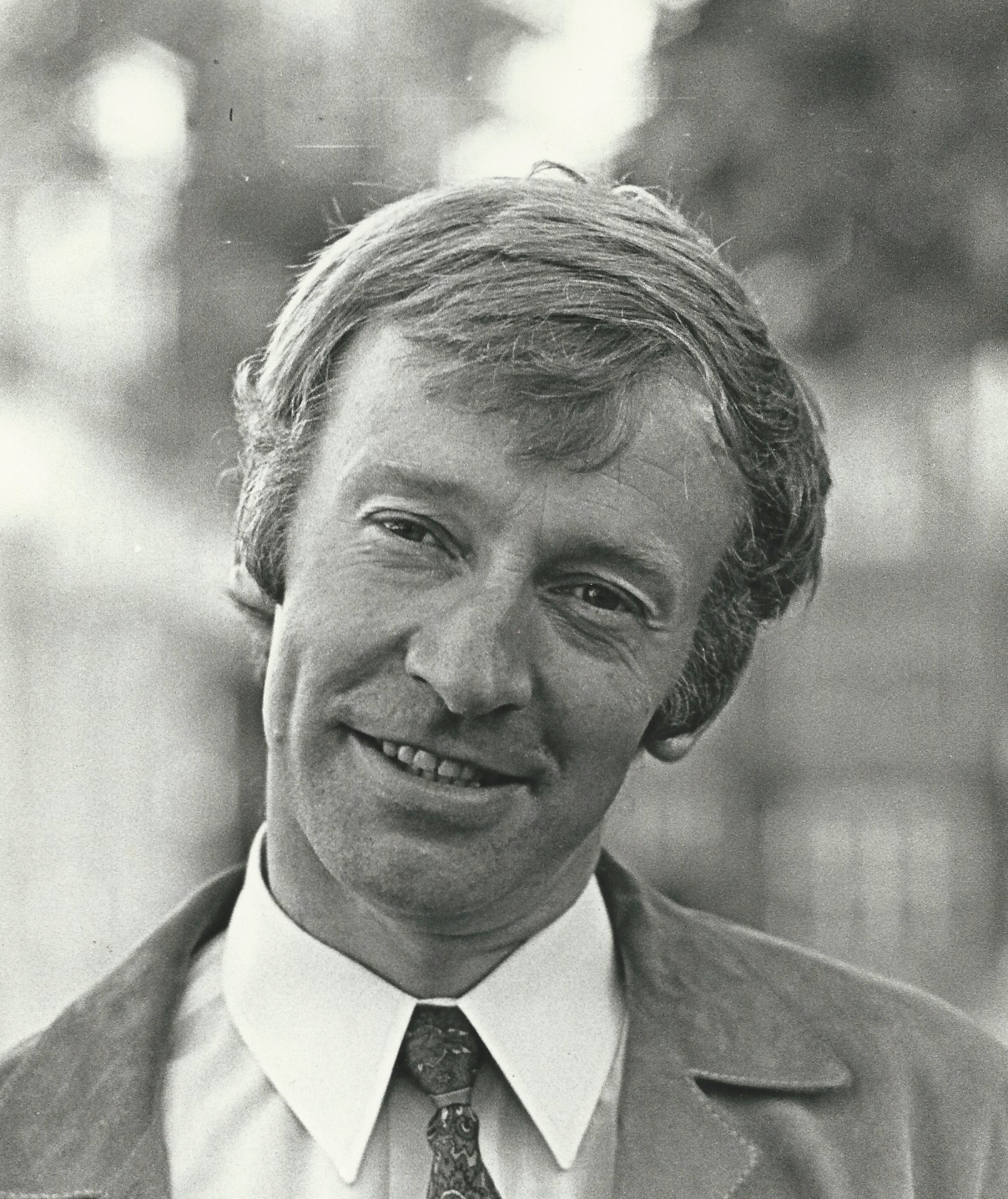
- Frisby, circa 1969
- Born: Terence Peter Michael Frisby; 28 November 1932; New Cross, London, England
- Died: 23 April 2020 (aged 87)
- Education: Dartford Grammar School
- Occupations: Playwright; actor; director; producer
- Years active: 1964–2012
- Children: Dominic Frisby

Terence Peter Michael Frisby (performing name Terence Holland; 28 November 1932 – 22 April 2020) was a British playwright, actor, director and producer, best known as the author of the play There's a Girl in My Soup.

== Early life ==
Frisby was born in 1932 in New Cross, south-east London, the second son of William Frisby, who worked on the railways, and Kathleen (née Campbell), who was employed in a department store. He was educated at Dartford Grammar School leaving aged 16 becoming a tailor's apprentice. He remained in the occupation for six years before gaining a place at the Central School of Speech and Drama and training to become an actor. He worked in repertory theatre under the name Terence Holland from 1957 to 1966. Under his stage name, he was also a presenter on the BBC's children's series Play School during the 1960s.

== Plays and other work ==
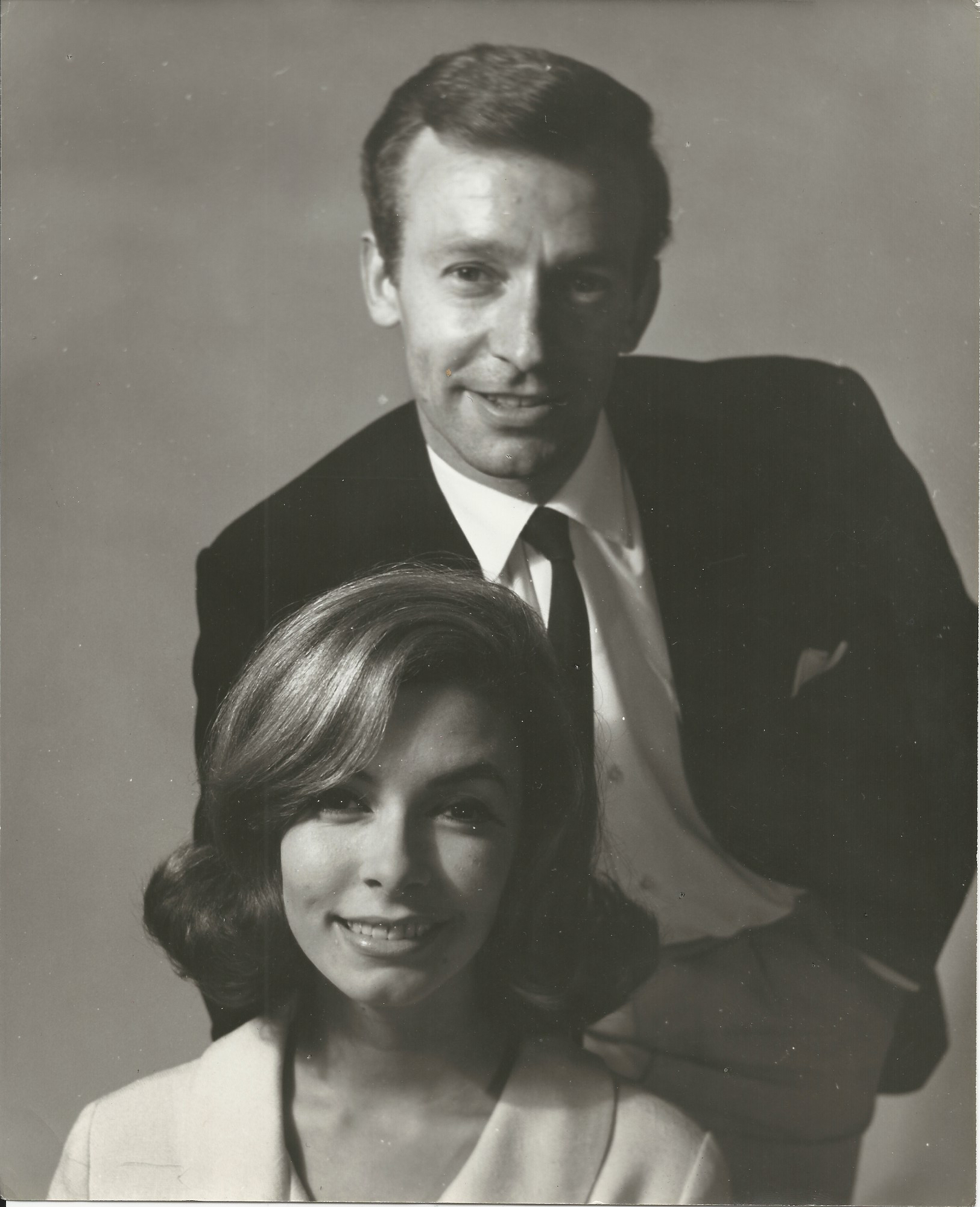
Frisby with wife Christine, circa 1966

There's a Girl in My Soup opened in 1966 at the Globe Theatre (now called the Gielgud Theatre) and ran for over 1,000 performances, before transferring to the Comedy Theatre for a further three years. It was a worldwide hit with runs on Broadway, Paris (with Gérard Depardieu), Madrid (with Concha Velasco), Berlin, Stockholm, Sydney, Rome (starring Domenico Modugno), Vienna, Prague and elsewhere. His script for the 1970 film, which starred Peter Sellers and Goldie Hawn, won the Writers' Guild of Great Britain Award in 1970 for the Best British Comedy Screenplay.

His other stage plays include The Subtopians (Arts Theatre 1964), The Bandwagon (Mermaid Theatre 1969), It's All Right If I Do It (Mermaid 1977), Seaside Postcard (Young Vic 1978), Rough Justice (Apollo Theatre 1994), and Funny About Love (two UK national tours 1999–2000). All his plays are published by Samuel French. The first performance of The Subtopians was in fact at the Guildford Theatre in the week of 26 March 1962. The second production, which transferred to the Arts Theatre in the West End in 1964, was directed by himself at Bromley Repertory Theatre, where he was working as a member of the rep company.

Frisby also wrote many plays for television, two of which were nominated for awards. His comedy series include Lucky Feller (1976) with David Jason (1976) and That's Love (1988–92) with Jimmy Mulville, Diana Hardcastle, and Tony Slattery, which won the Gold Award for Comedy at the 1991 Houston International Film Festival.

His radio play Just Remember Two Things: It's Not Fair And Don't Be Late for BBC Radio 4 won The Giles Cooper Award. A musical stage version was produced at the Queen's Theatre, Barnstaple in 2004 under the title Just Remember Two Things... A second production of the same show, under the title Kisses on a Postcard, was produced in 2011 at the same venue.

Frisby's book, Outrageous Fortune (1998), is an autobiographical account addressed to his son, Dominic Frisby, about his fifteen years as a litigant-in-person in the High Court following his divorce in 1971 from the model Christine Doppelt and his custody claim involving their son, who is now an author and comedian. Terence Frisby's second book is Kisses on a Postcard, published by Bloomsbury.(ISBN 9781408800584). It tells of his experiences as an evacuee as a 7-year-old from London to Cornwall during World War Two. It is based on the musical of the same name.

Frisby worked for over 50 years as an actor, director and producer. He played leads and directed in the West End, at the Young Vic and elsewhere in the UK. A presentation as a producer was the South African, multi-award-winning Woza Albert! at the Criterion Theatre in 1984. It was subsequently performed off-Broadway and worldwide.

Frisby was a founder member of the father's rights and support group Families Need Fathers, but became distant from the group terming it "Nippers Need Nutters". He died in April 2020, aged 87, from the side effects of treatment three years earlier for bladder cancer, which he did not have.
