= UK Independent Singles and Album Breakers Charts =

British record chart

The UK Independent Singles Breakers Chart and the UK Independent Album Breakers Chart are music charts based on UK sales of singles and albums released on independent record labels by musical artists who have never made the UK top 40. It is compiled weekly by the Official Charts Company (OCC), and is first published on their official website on Friday evenings. The chart was first launched on 29 June 2009, and, according to Martin Talbot, managing director of the OCC, would have benefited acts such as Friendly Fires and Grizzly Bear.

== History ==
The UK Indie Breakers Chart runs alongside the similar UK Indie Chart. The UK Indie Chart was created in 1978 by Cherry Red Records founder Iain McNay, and, like the breakers chart, lists only albums and singles released by independent record labels in the UK. Until June 2009, a single was classed as "indie" if it was shipped by a distribution service that was independent of the four major record companies: EMI, Sony Music Entertainment, Warner Music Group and Universal Music Group. Following discussion at the 2008 annual general meeting of the British Phonographic Industry, this definition was altered to include only releases from labels that were at least fifty per cent owned by a record company that was not one of the main four. This prevented major record companies from qualifying for the chart by outsourcing the shipping of their singles and albums to smaller distribution services. At the same time, the UK Indie Breakers Chart was also unveiled, with the objective that it would allow acts signed to independent labels to "reach the broader public". Any single or album released by an independent label can quality for the breakers charts, provided that the artist has never previously had a Top 20 hit in the mainstream charts.

The new indie charts went live on 29 June 2009; at the time, sales from independent labels contributed towards approximately a fifth of sales of albums and singles in the UK. The new charts were received positively by McNay, who remarked that they would, once again, "be genuinely independent charts which can help measure the success of, and promote independent records". Stewart Green, commercial director of the independent record company Beggars Group also praised the new charts. He stated: "This will provide a fascinating snapshot of those slow-burners that do not achieve instant success but sell consistently well over a period of time." Allison Schnackenberg of Southern Records was more critical, remarking that the "fifty per cent or more" rule was "blurring the lines to the point that the word 'independent' will be meaningless to the general public".

== See also ==
- Lists of UK Independent Singles and Albums Breakers Chart number ones
- List of UK Independent Singles Breakers Chart number ones of the 2010s
- List of UK Independent Singles Breakers Chart number ones of the 2020s
