= There's a Girl in My Soup (play) =

- Original language: English
- Written by: Terence Frisby
- Characters: 7
- Genre: Comedy
- Setting: Sumptuous 1960s apartment

Premiere
- Date: 30 May 1966
- Place: Golders Green Hippodrome

There's a Girl in My Soup is a stage comedy written by Terence Frisby. Set in the 1960s, it tells the story of a smooth-talking TV chef, Robert Danvers, who falls for a much younger woman, Marion. She leaves her hippie boyfriend, Jimmy, to live with Danvers, but eventually returns to Jimmy, leaving Danvers bereft.

It opened on 30 May 1966 at the Golders Green Hippodrome and transferred soon after to the Globe Theatre. There's a Girl in My Soup ran for 6 1/2 years until 1973 to become the longest-running comedy in the history of the West End. The play ran at the Globe Theatre for 3 1/2 years, from March 1966 until 6 August 1969, when it transferred to the Comedy Theatre, opening there on 18 August 1969 and closing in 1973 after 2,547 performances. Nat Cohen was an investor in the play.

It was unprecedented for a comedy to run for such a long time. This record was later broken by No Sex Please, We're British and then Run for Your Wife.

The title alludes to the well-known set-up line for a series of popular 20th century Anglo-American jokes about rude or sarcastic food servers: "Waiter, there's a fly in my soup."

== Productions ==
The show was directed by Bob Chetwyn and the first cast featured Donald Sinden, Barbara Ferris, Jon Pertwee and Clive Francis. The producer was Michael Codron. The record-breaking success of the show put Codron on the map as a producer. In June 1967 the role of Robert Danvers was taken over by Gerald Flood, who played the role until December 1968, when Peter Byrne took over the role until 1970, when Charles 'Bud' Tingwell played the part until the show closed. The role of Andrew Hunter was played by William Franklyn, who was succeeded in June 1968 by Richard Coleman. The role of Marion was played by Belinda Carroll. In 1969 the play transferred to the Comedy Theatre, starring Peter Byrne, Karen Kessey and Richard Coleman. Karen Kessey played Marion for two years, never missing a performance. Later the production starred Charles Tingwell, Gay Singleton and Richard Coleman. Coleman understudied the role of Robert Danvers and played the part occasionally, when required to do so. The play was taken out on a tour of the UK in 1973, with Danvers reprised by Gerald Flood, who ultimately played the role for over 650 performances. During the tour Andrew was played by Laurence Payne and John Hart Dyke and Marion was portrayed by Katy Manning and Anne Aston.

Ron Randell starred in a successful Australian tour.

The show transferred to Broadway with Gig Young in the main role, where it also enjoyed success, but not on the same level as in the West End. It ran from 16 October 1967 to 27 July 1968.

In 1991, Marc Sinden (Donald Sinden's son) played his father's part (Robert Danvers) in the 25th anniversary production at the Mill at Sonning Theatre with Louise English as Marion and John Challis as Andrew and co-directed by the author Terence Frisby.

It was later made into a film with Goldie Hawn and Peter Sellers, directed by Roy Boulting, for which Frisby won the Writers' Guild of Great Britain Award for Best Screenplay in 1970. The film was also a financial success.

== See also ==
- There's a Girl in My Soup, the film adaptation of the play

== Notes ==
1. V&A Theatre & Performance Enquiry Service Archives
2. Cameron Mackintosh Ltd. & Delfont Mackintosh Theatres Ltd Archives
3. Programmes of There's A Girl in My Soup
4. Posters & playbills of There's A Girl in My Soup
