= ThxSoMch =

Canadian singer-songwriter

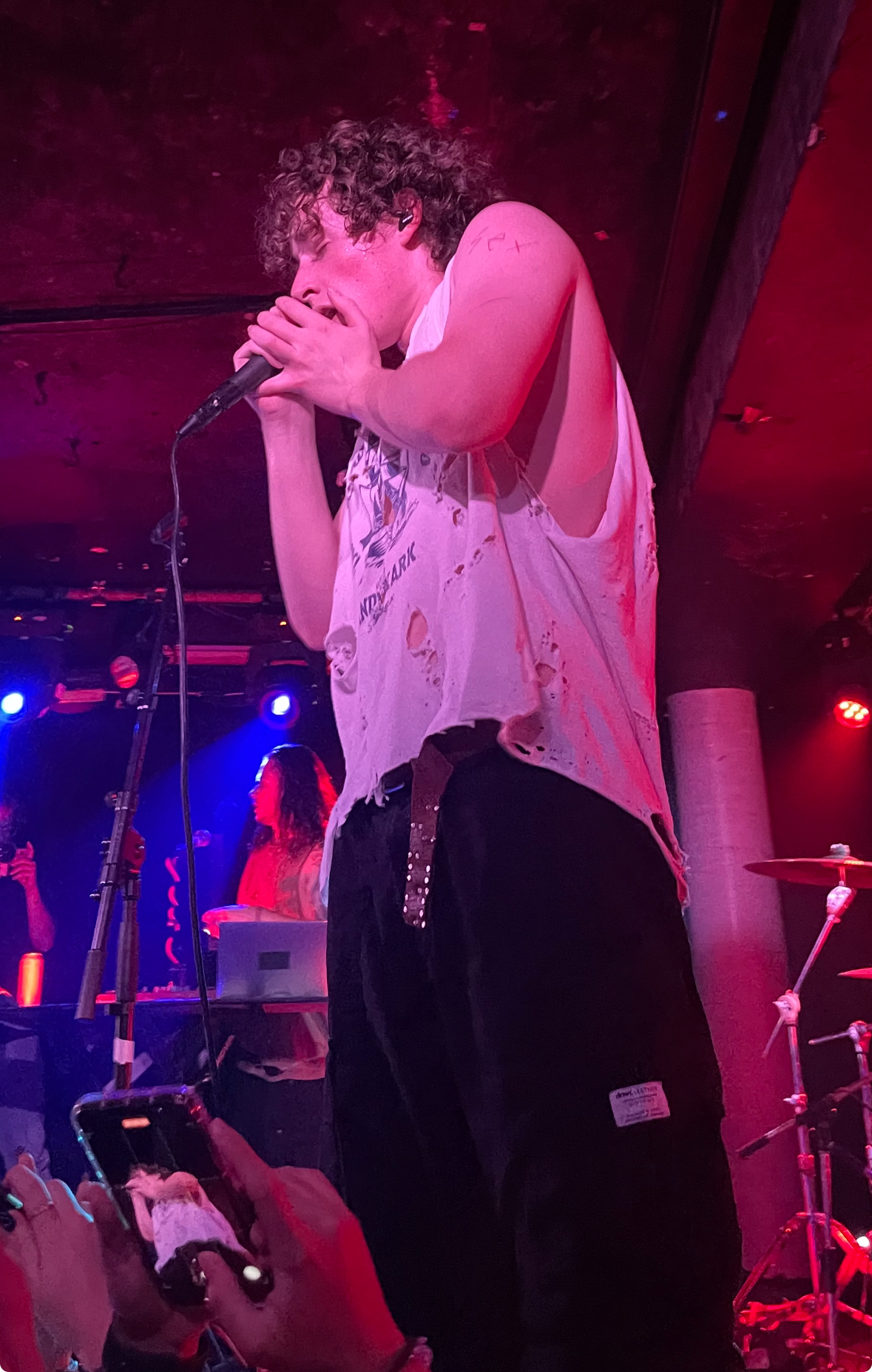
- ThxSoMch performing in London, 2023

Background information
- Born: Carter Antonio De Filippis; August 17, 2001 (age 25)
- Origin: Toronto, Ontario, Canada
- Genres: Post-punk revival; Indie rock
- Occupations: Singer; songwriter
- Instrument: Vocals
- Years active: 2022–present

Carter Antonio De Filippis (born August 17, 2001), known professionally as ThxSoMch, is a Canadian singer-songwriter. From Toronto, he started his career when he released his first single, "Runaway (Move Quick)" in September 2022. Gaining attention he released his biggest single "Spit in My Face!" in November 2022; as of July 2025, has garnered over 690 million streams on Spotify and charted internationally.

== Career ==
On September 4, 2022, ThxSoMch released "Runaway (Move Quick)", his first single. On September 12, his second single, "Only Need My Baby! (SMOAGT)" was released followed by "Like I'm British" on September 22 and "How You Always Look So Good?" on September 29.

ThxSoMch released his fifth single, "Spit in My Face!" on December 7, 2022 which was a success right away. It was praised for being a "dark indie rock anthem" by Ones to Watch. On the US Billboard Hot Rock Songs chart, the song peaked at number nine. The song also debuted at 100 on the Billboard Hot 100 chart. On the UK Singles Chart, the song reached number 56. The song peaked at number one on the UK Independent Singles Breakers Chart.

In January 2023, ThxSoMch released the single "Caroline", followed by "Hate" the following month and "Crumbled" in April 2023. He announced his debut EP, Sleez, would be released on May 19, 2023.

== Discography ==
=== Extended plays ===
- Sleez (2023)

=== Studio albums ===
- The Sound of You Laughing (2025)

=== Singles ===
List of singles, showing year released, selected chart positions and album name
Title	Year	Peak chart positions									Certifications	Album
Title	Year	CAN	AUS	AUT	GER	IRE	LAT	UK	US	WW	Certifications	Album
"Runaway (Move Quick)"	2022	—	—	—	—	—	*	—	—	—		Non-album singles
"Only Need My Baby! (SMOAGT)"	2022	—	—	—	—	—	*	—	—	—		Non-album singles
"Like I'm British" (featuring Yxng LJ)	2022	—	—	—	—	—	*	—	—	—		Non-album singles
"How You Always Look So Good?"	2022	—	—	—	—	—	*	—	—	—		Non-album singles
"Imperfect Girl" (with thekid.ACE)	2022	—	—	—	—	—	*	—	—	—		Non-album singles
"Keep It Tucked"	2022	—	—	—	—	—	*	—	—	—		Sleez
"Spit in My Face!"	2022	67	82	67	76	50	7	56	100	121	MC: Platinum; ARIA: Gold; RIAA: Platinum; BPI: Gold	Sleez
"Caroline"	2023	—	—	—	—	—	—	—	—	—		Sleez
"Hate."	2023	—	—	—	—	—	—	—	—	—		Sleez
"Crumbled"	2023	—	—	—	—	—	—	—	—	—		Sleez
"Hide Your Kids"	2024	—	—	—	—	—	—	—	—	—		
"that b*tch don't even know my name"	2024		—	—	—	—	—	—	—	—		
"BITTER" ft. Max Fry	2024	—	—	—	—	—	—	—	—	—		Non-album single
"—" denotes a recording that did not chart or was not released in that territory. "*" denotes the chart did not exist at that time.
