= Sales (band) =

American indie pop band

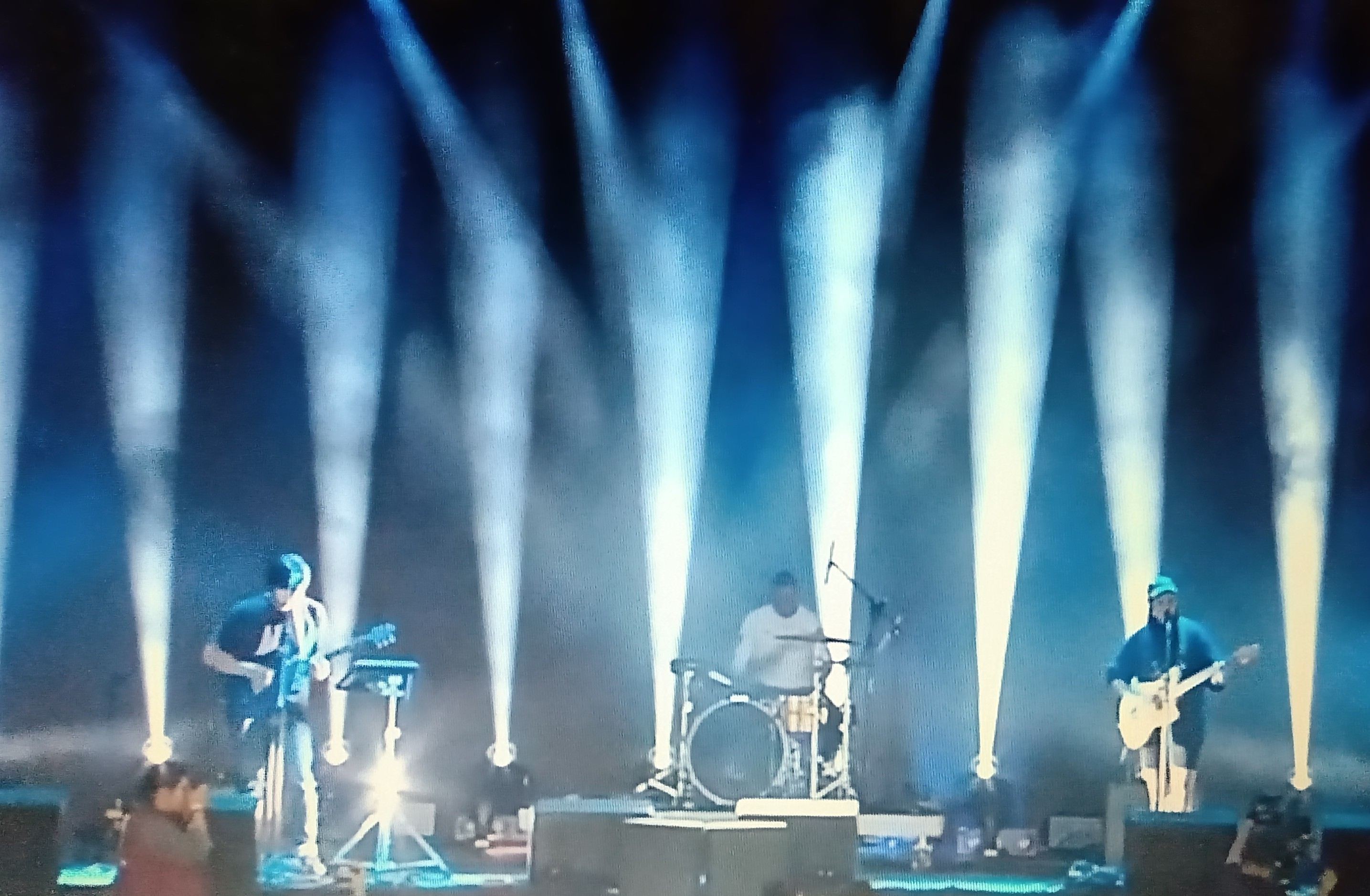
- Sales performing in Mexico City, 2019

Background information
- Origin: Orlando, Florida, United States
- Genres: Lo-fi, dream pop, bedroom pop, indie rock, indie pop
- Years active: 2013–present
- Label: Sales
- Members: Lauren Morgan; Jordan Shih; Malcolm Martin (touring)
- Past members: Joy Cyr (touring)
- Website: wearenotsales.com

Sales (stylized in all caps) is an American guitar-based indie pop band from Orlando, Florida. The band's members are musicians Lauren Morgan and Jordan Shih. They are joined on tour by Malcolm Martin, who serves as the live drummer and percussionist.

In July 2014, the band was named "Ones to Watch" for the second half of 2014 by The Hype Machine as it being one of the most blogged artists yet to release a long play album.

The band is independent and self-released their first 7" single Renee/Tonka Time on December 1, 2013, through the music platform Bandcamp. Their first EP was released in September 2014, and their first album in April 2016.

Artwork for all of the band's releases is done by collage artist and designer Alana Questell.

== History ==
Morgan (guitar, vocals) and Shih (guitar, programming) formed the band in Orlando, Florida after the longtime friends had been recording music together on and off for several years. Their latest musical project, SALES, is based on vocal and instrumental improvisation as well as sampling.

On January 31, 2014, the first day of the Chinese New Year, the band released their second single titled "Chinese New Year". The band subsequently received positive acclaim from music blogs, including CMJ, Stereogum, and Pigeons and Planes. CMJ described the track as a "...sandy, sashaying tune with singer Lauren Morgan's slightly cooing vocals skipping over upbeat guitars and a little synthy buzz. At least the Year of the Horse is sounding pretty good so far."

On September 16, the band announced the release of their debut EP, along with a remix by fellow Orlando musician XXYYXX. They released their EP, along with a track titled "Getting It On" on September 22, 2014.

On April 12, 2016, the band hosted a live Twitch stream and listening party where they played tracks from their upcoming self-titled debut and revealed the artwork by Alana Questell. The album, titled Sales LP, was released on April 20, 2016. In one review by DIY the band's self-titled album was rated at 4/5 stars and described as having "a gift for appearing both shy and direct".

On August 18, 2016, the band announced via their Facebook page that an additional member, drummer Joy Cyr, would be joining for their 2016 touring season.

By April 2017, Cyr had been replaced by Malcolm Martin, who has continued as its touring drummer, and is frequently tagged and featured in photos on their social media. However, Martin is not listed as an official band member on its Facebook or Bandcamp. The band still brands itself as a "duo" on its Twitter.

In September 2017, the band released the single, "Talk a Lot". They followed this up with the single "Off and On" in February 2018, and "White Jeans" in May 2018. In July 2018, Sales released its second album, Forever & Ever. The cover photo was taken by Malcolm Martin, a contrast to their previous releases, in which all artwork had been done by Alana Questell. The three single covers also featured photographs, though it is unclear who took the photos from their website. In one review by Pitchfork, Forever & Ever was rated at 7.0/10 and described as "a world of cozy, minimalist pop."

As of April 26, 2020, Sales had 3,647,906 monthly listeners on Spotify. Between March 28 and May 5, 2019, they toured across the southern portion of the United States. In 2019, two of the band's songs, "Renee" and "Chinese New Year" went viral on TikTok. In December 2021, the band's song "Pope Is a Rockstar" went viral on TikTok.

While the band hasn't released anything since 2022, Morgan has assured that Sales has not disbanded, and "is going to live forever & ever". However, no reunion date has been teased so far.

Morgan began releasing solo music as Lorg on September 6, 2024 with the first single “Brandy.”

On March 26, 2025, Lorg, released their second single, "Crossroads" co-produced by Adam McDaniel at Drop Of Sun Studios in Asheville, NC. In the comments of a Sales' Instagram post promoting the single, Jordan Shih denied fans assuming the end of the band.

== Discography ==
=== Albums ===
- Sales LP (2016, self-released)
- Forever & Ever (2018, self-released)

=== Compilations ===
- Majestic Casual II (2014, Majestic)
- Those Who Were Once Friends Are Now Fam (2014, Odd Castles)

=== EP ===
- Sales EP (2014)

=== Charted singles ===
Title	Year	Peak chart positions			Album
Title	Year	CAN	IRE	UK	Album
"Pope is a Rockstar"	2016	89	52	82	Sales LP

=== Other singles ===
- "Renee/Tonka Time" 7" (2013, self-released)
- "Renee" (2013, self-released)
- "Chinese New Year" (2014, self-released)
- "Vow" (2014, self-released)
- "Toto" (2014, self-released)
- "Jamz" (2016, self-released)
- "Ivy" (2016, self-released)
- "For You" (2016, self-released)
- "Talk a Lot" (2017, self-released)
- "Off and On" (2018, self-released)
- "White Jeans" (2018, self-released)
- "Can't Be Yours Forever" (2021)
- "Moving by Backwards" (2022)
- "July" (2022)
