= Dominic Frisby =

British author, comedian and voice over artist

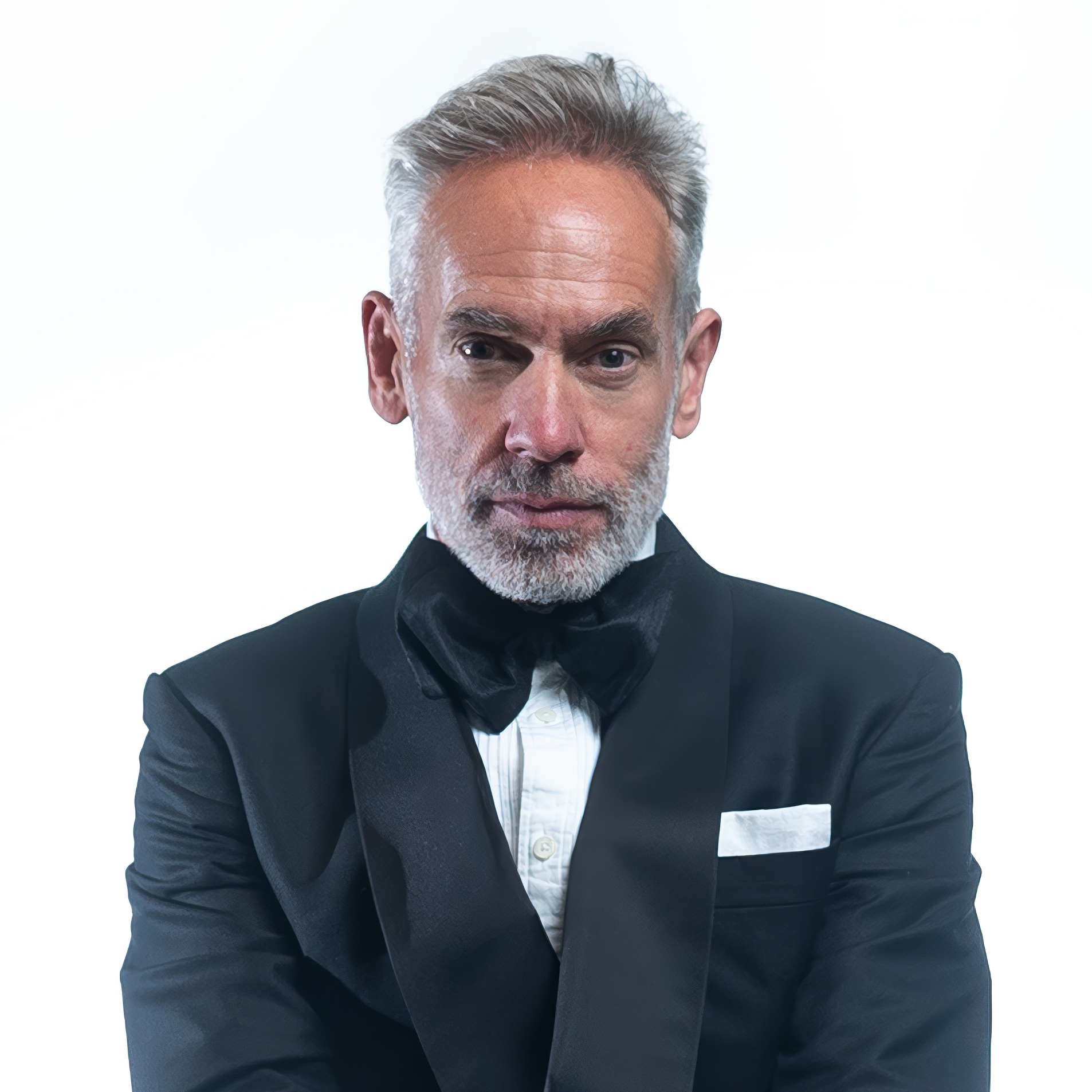
- Frisby in 2025
- Born: 1969 or 1970 (age 56–57)
- Education: St Paul's School; Manchester University; Webber Douglas Academy of Dramatic Art
- Occupations: Author, comedian, voice over artist
- Years active: 1994–present
- Parent(s): Terence Frisby; Christine Doppelt

Dominic Frisby is a British comedian, author and voice actor, known both for his satirical songs and his commentary on finance and economics.

He has variously been described as “mercurially witty” (Lloyd Evans in the Spectator), having “a genius touch” (Dominic Cavendish in the Telegraph) and “all over the place” (Brian Logan in the Guardian).

In the UK, his best known song is "17 Million Fuck Offs". Worldwide his song, "We’re All Far Right Now", has more than 50 million views.

His books, including The Secret History of Gold: Myth, Money, Politics and Power, Daylight Robbery: How Tax Shaped Our Past and Will Change Our Future, Bitcoin: The Future of Money? and Life After the State, explore economic and historical issues such as money, gold, taxation, bitcoin, and investment. Frisby also writes and speaks on these topics through his columns and his newsletter, The Flying Frisby. He has written two feature documentaries on related subjects, Four Horsemen and Adam Smith: Father of the Fringe.

== Early life and education ==
Born in the United Kingdom, he is the son of the playwright Terence Frisby, and Christine Vecchione. He was educated at St Paul's School and Manchester University, where he studied Italian and drama, and the Webber Douglas Academy of Dramatic Art.

== Career ==
=== Early comedy ===
Frisby began performing live stand-up in 1997 with a musical comedy act, the Upper-Class Rap, which he had originally tried to get released as a Christmas novelty single. His friend, a music agent, brother of anarchic comedian Malcolm Hardee, advised him to try it out at his brother's comedy club, Up The Creek in Greenwich, which he did. “The next thing I knew I was a comedian,” Frisby said.

He won the Ha Bloody Ha New Act of the Year competition in 1998 in a final that included Hal Cruttenden, Mickey Flanagan, and Rob Rouse. In 1999 he was runner-up the Leicester Mercury New Comedian of the Year.

He followed the Upper-Class Rap with other character acts, including Alpine slap-dancer, Ludwig the Bavarian, farm hand Morris the Morris Dancer, and It guy Simon la Fontaine. Steve Bennett writing for Chortle in 2000 said his show was “a series of fine comic characters delivering some inspired gags” but “sadly patchy.” Writing for the Guardian, Dave Simpson said the show was “unusual, but hugely funny” and that “Frisby is a comic catch.”

Frisby began compering in 2003, and became resident host at London’ Downstairs at the King's Head in Crouch End, which he called his "favourite venue".

He still comperes on the UK comedy circuit today and is said to be Nigel Farage's favourite comic.

=== Edinburgh Fringe ===
Frisby has written and performed in several shows at Edinburgh Festival Fringe.

- 1999 The Big Value Comedy Show with Robin Ince, Howard Read and others.
- 2000 Asprey and Frisby.
- 2001 Aaah, Dominic Frisby!
- 2001 The Sitcom Trials with Miranda Hart.
- 2003 Truth and Bullshit.
- 2016 Let's Talk About Tax, which formed the basis for his book Daylight Robbery.
- 2016 The Upper-Class Rapper.
- 2018 Dominic Frisby's Financial Gameshow.
- 2019 Libertarian Love Songs.
- 2019 The Shadowpunk Revolution.
- 2019 Adam Smith: Father of the Fringe.
- 2022 How Heavy? A Brief History of Weights and Measures.
- 2023 Gold: A Lecture With Funny Bits.
- 2024 Shaping the Earth. A Lighthearted History of Mining.

=== Father of the Fringe ===
In 2020, when Edinburgh Festival Fringe was closed because of COVID-19, Frisby shot Adam Smith: Father of the Fringe, a feature documentary based on his lecture the previous year, directed by Alex Webster, featuring comedians Jimmy Carr, Al Murray, Shazia Mirza, Henning Wehn and Arthur Smith. It described the economic success story of the Fringe, and argued that it derives from the philosophies of Adam Smith. It was released during the reduced Fringe of 2021, in collaboration with Panmure House where Adam Smith lived.

Critic Bruce Dessau said it was, “a lovely history of the Fringe.” Writing for Chortle, Steve Bennett took issue with the economic arguments of the film, but admitted,”this film is a celebration of what makes the Fringe ... so thrilling and mad and creative and vast.”

=== TV and radio ===
In the run-up to the 2001 UK general election, he appeared several times on BBC Radio 4's Loose Ends with a series of spoof party political broadcasts, culminating, after the record low turn-out, with The Victory Speech by the Apathy Party.

In 2001, he played Davina McCall’s boyfriend Jez in the sitcom Sam's Game with Ed Byrne, and he played Captain Rimming alongside Pam Ann in Mile High Club, part of Comedy Lab.

In 2005, he played salsa teacher Jez in an episode of Murder in Suburbia, and in 2006 he appeared in Titty Titty Bang Bang. In 2007, he presented comedy movie review show, Sky Comedy Close-Up.

In 2008-10 he voiced Roary the Racing Car with Peter Kay. In 2010 he also appeared in Scrooby Trevithick with Andy Parsons. He also had a role in The Inbetweeners Movie (2011).

In 2014 He appeared on BBC Radio 4 in Simon Evans Goes to Market on to discuss gold, in Kerry's List with Kerry Godliman and in Hal with Hal Cruttenden.

In May 2017 he presented a pilot panel show for BBC Radio 4, More Money Than Sense with Andy Zaltzman, Paul Sinha, Shazia Mirza and Gráinne Maguire.

In 2018 he hosted Money Pit with Jason Manford on Dave and appeared on BBC Radio 4's Moral Maze to discuss the morality of comedy.

In 2019 he appeared in Simon Evans is Right on BBC Radio 4.

In 2020 he appeared on BBC Radio's 4's The Now Show with his song Lockdown Blues.

In 2021, he became one of the presenters of GB News' comedy newspaper review programme Headliners, with Frisby co-presenting most of the nightly shows alongside BBC Radio 4 comedian Simon Evans.

In 2022 he wrote and presented Damned Lies, a panel show, about statistics for BBC Radio 4 with Sir David Speigelhalter, Paul Foot, Gary Delaney, Janey Godley and Lucy Porter.

In 2023 he appeared in The Oldest Comedy Club in Britain, a documentary about Downstairs At The King's Head, where he was resident host since 2003.

In 2024 he appeared in Unsafe Space on BBC Radio 4 with Andrew Doyle, Graham Linehan and Simon Evans.

In 2025 he appeared in Grooming Gangs Cover Up.

=== Finance and writing ===
Alongside his comedy, Frisby is an financial writer focusing on gold, bitcoin, taxation, investments and economic history. He has been a MoneyWeek contributor since 2006, and has written for other publications, including The Guardian, Aeon, CapX, and The Telegraph.

Frisby's first book, Life After the State (2013) has been described variously as "a rollicking defence of anarcho-capitalism [and] a fantastic read" by The Idler's Tom Hodgkinson, while former Conservative MP Steve Baker said, "it's all far too radical for a Conservative, but I challenge anyone to read his accounts of life in Cuba and the decline of Glasgow and not be moved".

His second book, Bitcoin: The Future of Money (2014), deals with the online currency Bitcoin and includes research on its creator Satoshi Nakamoto. In The Spectator Michael Bywater stated that "since reading Bitcoin I have been thinking about money ... with the same sort of intensity that atheists reserve for their relationship with God", however The Economist mused that "for any book on bitcoin to be worth reading, though, it has to delve further".

In his third book, Daylight Robbery: How Tax Shaped Our Past and Will Change Our Future (2019) Frisby argues that there is a tax story behind all of humanity's defining events, and he suggests that the reader "look at the world through the prism of taxation". Writing in the Sunday Times Luke Johnson said it was, "a highly readable account of a very dry subject, but one of paramount importance". It was selected by Merryn Somerset Webb as one of her six Christmas book choices for 2019.

His fourth book, The Secret History of Gold: Myth, Money, Politics and Power (Penguin; 2025), explores the history of gold and its enduring significance in the digital age.

=== Voiceover ===
Frisby has been a prolific voiceover artist since 1993, having voiced numerous TV programmes, adverts, promos, cartoons and documentaries.

He estimates he has narrated more than 500 documentaries for the BBC, ITV and other channels, including Madness in the Fast Lane, 42 episodes of How Do They Do It? and The Secret Life of an Office Cleaner.

=== Other work ===
He was pitch-side announcer at Fulham F.C. in 2004, briefly replacing David Hamilton, before Hamilton was reinstated.

In 2008-9, he worked as a boxing ring announcer for Setanta and David Haye’s boxing promotions company Hayemaker.

In 2011 he co-wrote and narrated the feature documentary Four Horsemen, editing after the film was shot and writing the narration. The film featured, among others, Joseph Stiglitz, former chief economist at the World Bank; Noam Chomsky, linguistics professor; and steady-state theorist Herman Daly, formerly at the World Bank.

Film critic Derek Adams wrote in Time Out London that: "Instead of bombarding us with sensational imagery and scaremongering, this competently narrated, intelligibly structured and cleverly illustrated film presents its case via a succession of insights from a group of smart, rational orators. ... This is a film perhaps better suited to DVD, simply because there are thoughts here of such profundity you might feel the need to reach for the rewind button. I, for one, have been left substantially enlightened."

Following a dispute with Four Horsemen director Ross Ashcroft, Frisby wrote a short graphic novel, The Vampire Comedian, with art by Michael Lee-Graham, about a vampire comedian who plagiarises his writers and sucks their blood.

In June 2018 he helped set up and became a director of Cypherpunk Holdings Inc, a Canadian-listed company focused on privacy technology investments, before, in November 2019, becoming CEO. He resigned in 2020 due to family illness, shortly before his father, Terence Frisby’s death.

In 2019 he wrote, narrated and produced The Shadowpunk Revolution a dystopian, sci-fi rock drama about invisibility, based on his Edinburgh Show of the same name. Co-written by Brendon Connelly with music by Asaf Zohar.

=== Kisses on a Postcard ===
In 2021, he adapted, produced, composed songs and directed a six-part serialised podcast version of Kisses on a Postcard, the story of his father Terence Frisby’s experiences as a child evacuee in World War Two. He said he had invested a “comical” amount of money and was “almost certainly going to lose his shirt.”

The cast of 46 included John Owen-Jones, Katy Secombe, Rosie Cavaliero, Marcia Warren, James Clyde, Evelyn Hoskins, Rupert Degas, Jonathan Kydd and others, plus 21 children. It was recorded at Abbey Road Studios.

In the Best Serialized Podcast category at the New York Festivals Radio Awards, it won silver.

=== Public stunts ===
Frisby has engaged in several high-profile, comedic stunts.

In 2001, he took part in an attempt to get into the Guinness Book of Records at Edinburgh as one of 45 comics onstage in 45 minutes. He created the website Perrier Bets in 2004 to take bets on who would win the Perrier Award at Edinburgh.

On the run-up to the day of Brexit, pro-EU activists started a campaign to get Ludwig van Beethoven's "Ode to Joy" (used as the EU anthem) performed by André Rieu to Number One on the day of Brexit, so Frisby launched a counter-campaign to get his satirical folk song "17 Million Fuck Offs" in the charts. It reached number 43 in the UK Singles Charts.

On Brexit Day, 31 January 2020, Frisby was invited by Leave Means Leave to perform "17 Million Fuck Offs" at their Brexit celebration in Parliament Square. He was told that he could not sing the phrase "fuck off" on the stage as that would be a public order offence. Instead, he had the crowd sing the words, saying “They can't arrest 40,000 of you.”

In 2020 he tried without success to get his song, I'm Gonna Marry, Gary selected as Britain's 2021 Eurovision entry, maintaining even after he failed to get selected, that he would have done better than Embers by James Newman, which came last with no points.

=== Podcasting ===
In January 2007 he started investment podcast Commodity Watch Radio, which was later rebranded to Frisby's Bulls and Bears, and continues today as the Flying Frisby.

In 2015 he started the Virgin Podcast in collaboration with Virgin. Interviewees included strategist Alastair Campbell, Innocent drinks founder, Richard Reed, popular science author, Adam Grant and Nick Wheeler, founder of Charles Tyrwhitt.

After it was revealed in Lord Ashcroft's biography of Prime Minister David Cameron that he had smoked pot at university with journalist James Delingpole, Frisby invited Delingpole onto the podcast to be interviewed. The Guardian published an article “Why is climate champion Richard Branson allowing deniers on a Virgin podcast?” and the podcast was terminated shortly after.

== Books ==
- The Secret History of Gold: Myth, Money, Politics and Power. Penguin Business (2025) ISBN 978-0-241-72834-5
- Daylight Robbery: How Tax Shaped Our Past and Will Change Our Future, Portfolio Penguin (2019). ISBN 978-0-241-36086-6
- The Shadowpunk Revolution : A Sci-Fi Rock Drama About Invisibility (2019) with Brendon Connelly.
- Bitcoin: The Future of Money, Unbound (2014). ISBN 978-1-78352-077-0 (Republished in 2025 by Booksmith)
- Life After The State, Unbound (2013). ISBN 978-1-908717-89-4 (Republished in 2024 by Dominic Frisby)
- The Vampire Comedian (2012)
- Why Gold is the Currency of the Free: A short essay about gold, money and freedom (2009)

== Discography ==
=== Albums ===
- Libertarian Love Songs (2019)
- Anthems for the Excommunicated (2021)
- Before I'm Deleted (Live album, 2021)
- Gammon and Proud (2022)
- Contains Swearing (EP, 2022)
- It's All True (2023)
- We Are All Far Right Now (2024)

=== Singles ===
- Debt Bomb (2012).
- 17 Million F** Offs* (2018)
- The National Anthem of Libertaria (2018)
- I'm Gonna Marry Gary (2022)
- I Am a White Man and I'm Sorry (2022)
- We Are All Far Right Now (2024)
- Wrong Age, Wrong Sex, Wrong Colour (2025)

== Politics ==
Frisby is a right-libertarian, who makes the argument that “where government gets involved in people's lives with a desire to do good, it can always be relied on to make the situation worse”.

In 2018, he wrote the words for the National Anthem of Libertaria, which he put to the music of the hymn of the Bolshevik Party, “partly because of the obvious irony, partly because it's such a good song, but mainly because it's out of copyright.” He is known for inviting his audiences to sing the National Anthem of Libertaria at the beginning of his shows. In 2025, he released the lyrics into the public domain.

A supporter of Brexit, in 2019, he was announced as the Brexit Party's parliamentary candidate in Old Bexley and Sidcup, but quickly stood down because “it wasn't worth the abuse”.

== Personal life ==
Frisby is based in London and has four children.

His brother-in-law is former boxer, David Haye. His cousin is BBC presenter, Clare Frisby.
