= Skechers (song) =

2020 single by DripReport

Single by DripReport
- Released: January 12, 2020
- Recorded: Dec 2019
- Genre: Comedy hip hop; trap
- Length: 1:46
- Label: Arista
- Songwriters: Haseeb Ahmad; Julian Hecker
- Producer: Ouhhboy

DripReport singles chronology
"Skechers" (2020)	"Places" (2020)

Alternative cover
- Original cover

Music videos
- "Skechers (original video)" on YouTube
- "Skechers (animated video)" on YouTube

"Skechers" is a song by American YouTuber DripReport. The track was self-released on January 12, 2020, before being re-released by Arista Records, and was produced by Ouhhboy. The track is DripReport's debut single, and is also his first charting single.

On May 27, 2020, Skechers launched a Skechers Million Mask Giveaway Dance Challenge in which Skechers donated 10 face masks to United Way of Greater Los Angeles for every dance video uploaded of the song on TikTok with hashtag #danceformasks or #MillionMaskChallenge, with @Skechers tagged in its caption. The maximum giveaway was of one million masks. The challenge ended on June 17, 2020.

== Background ==
Most of the song's success can be attributed to social media app TikTok, where over 10 million videos have been made with the song, with a total of more than 5 billion views. The first official music video has 136 million views on YouTube, while the second music video has 6 million views.

== Composition ==
"Skechers" is a short song, with a duration of 1 minute and 46 seconds. The track is written from the perspective of a man attempting to entice his romantic interest into a relationship. He is particularly fixated on her "light-up Skechers", which inspire the title of the song. The lyrics are sung in a stereotypical Indian accent. "Skechers" was written by DripReport and Ouhboy, the latter also producing. Official remixes of the song featuring American rapper Tyga and Indian rapper Badshah were later released.

The song is written in the key of A-flat minor with a tempo of 100 beats per minute.

== Commercial performance ==
"Skechers" charted in countries including New Zealand, Norway, UK, Australia, Ireland, Sweden, Switzerland, Germany and Canada.

== Charts ==
Chart performance of "Skechers"
Chart (2020)	Peak position
Australia (ARIA)	47
Austria (Ö3 Austria Top 40)	40
Belgium (Ultratip Bubbling Under Flanders)	5
Belgium (Ultratop 50 Wallonia)	48
Canada (Canadian Hot 100)	36
Czech Republic Singles Digital (ČNS IFPI)	35
Denmark (Tracklisten)	34
France (SNEP)	6
Germany (GfK)	41
Hungary (Stream Top 40)	36
Ireland (IRMA)	50
Lithuania (AGATA)	35
Malaysia (RIM)	9
Netherlands (Single Top 100)	88
New Zealand (Recorded Music NZ)	15
Norway (VG-lista)	37
Portugal (AFP)	97
Slovakia Singles Digital (ČNS IFPI)	27
Sweden (Sverigetopplistan)	47
Switzerland (Schweizer Hitparade)	32
UK Singles (OCC)	39
UK Hip Hop/R&B (OCC)	29
UK Indie (OCC)	4
US Bubbling Under Hot 100 Singles (Billboard)	3

== Certifications ==
Certifications for "Skechers"
Region	Certification	Certified units/sales
Australia (ARIA)	Gold	35,000^{‡}
Austria (IFPI Austria)	Gold	15,000^{‡}
Canada (Music Canada)	Platinum	80,000^{‡}
France (SNEP)	Gold	100,000^{‡}
Mexico (AMPROFON)	Platinum	60,000^{‡}
New Zealand (RMNZ)	Platinum	30,000^{‡}
United Kingdom (BPI)	Silver	200,000^{‡}
United States (RIAA)	Platinum	1,000,000^{‡}
^{‡} Sales+streaming figures based on certification alone.
