= Lets Link =

2020 single by WhoHeem

Single by WhoHeem
- Released: August 20, 2020
- Genre: West Coast Rap
- Length: 2:39
- Label: Arista; Columbia
- Songwriter(s): Calvin Burdine; Micha Armstard; Makai Franklin; Kyle Anuforo
- Producer(s): LoyalThePlug

WhoHeem singles chronology
"Drugs" (2020)	"Lets Link" (2020)

Music video
- "Lets Link" on YouTube

"Lets Link" is a song by American rapper WhoHeem. It was released on August 20, 2020, and garnered popularity soon after on the video-sharing app TikTok. A remix featuring American rapper ppcocaine was released, along with another featuring American rappers Lil Mosey, and Tyga. A music video was released on October 5, 2020.

== Background ==
On August 19, 2020, WhoHeem posted a video of him singing the song on his Instagram profile, asking his followers if he should release it next. The song was self-released the following day, and later reissued through Arista Records and Columbia Records following WhoHeem's signing to both labels. It soon went viral on the video-sharing app TikTok. By September 8, 2020, it was used in over 630,000 videos, where it inspired the #SidePieceChallenge, which shows "sidepiece" girls exposing men for cheating on their girlfriends with them.

== Reception ==
Complimenting the "irresistibly catchy" hook and fingersnap heavy instrumental, Alphonse Pierre of Pitchfork said the song "seems inspired by San Bernardino, California rapper Whoheem's experiences hitting on girls in their Instagram DMs and it sounds as if it was written at his local mall's food court".

== Charts ==
Chart (2020)	Peak position
Belgium (Ultratip Bubbling Under Flanders)	36
Canada (Canadian Hot 100)	71
New Zealand Hot Singles (RMNZ)	4
UK Singles (OCC)	63
US Billboard Hot 100	86
US Hot R&B/Hip-Hop Songs (Billboard)	32
US Rolling Stone Top 100	47

== Certifications ==
Region	Certification	Certified units/sales
United States (RIAA)	Gold	500,000^{‡}
^{‡} Sales+streaming figures based on certification alone.
