= Øneheart =

Russian musician (born 2006)

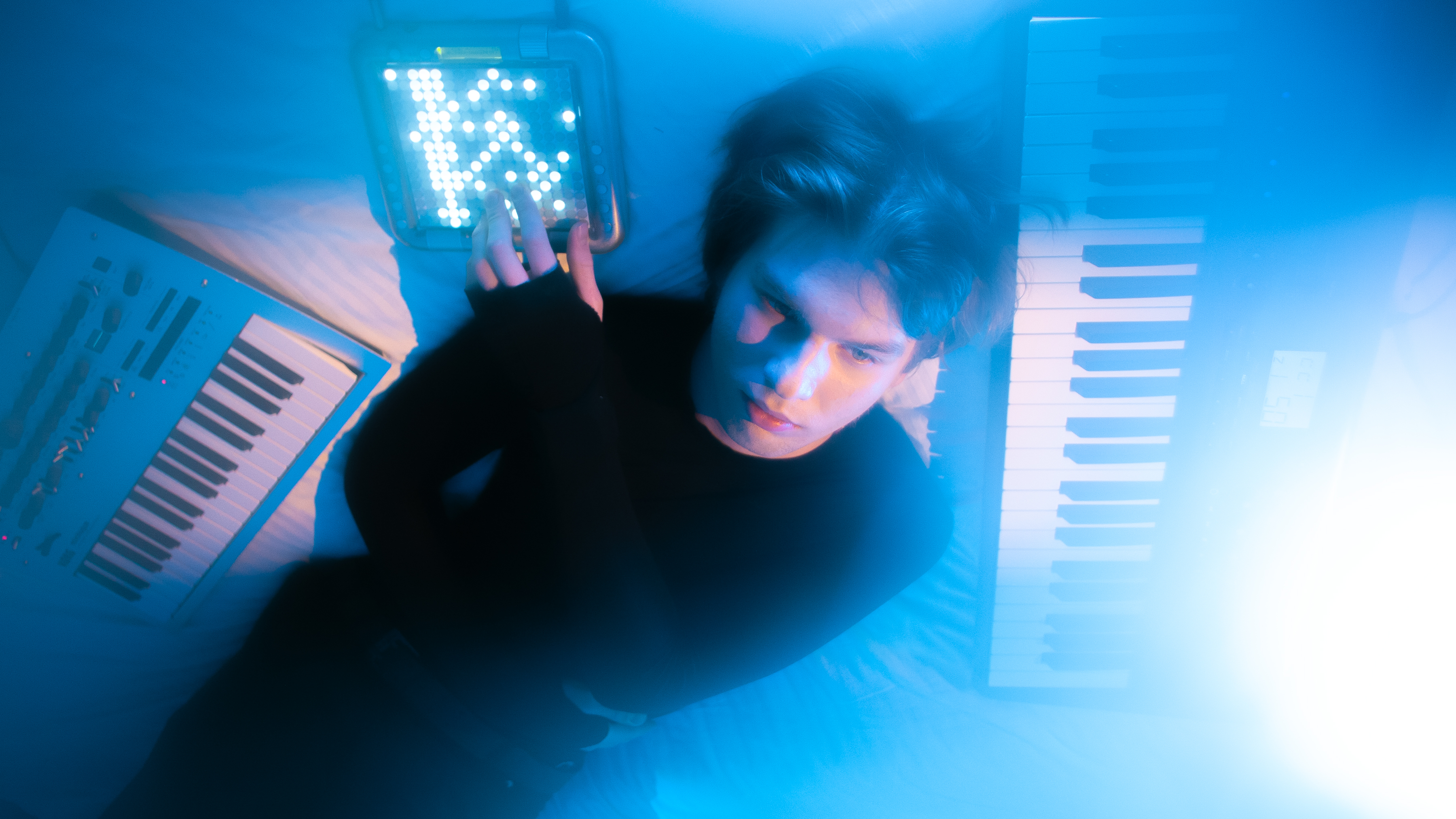
- Øneheart in 2025

Background information
- Also known as: hisotsu
- Born: Dmitry Iliich Volynkin; March 22, 2006 (age 20)
- Origin: Kirsanov, Russia
- Genres: Ambient; wave; lo-fi; jazzhop
- Years active: 2018–present
- Labels: Dreamscape; Monstercat

Dmitry Iliich Volynkin (born March 22, 2006), better known as Øneheart, is a Russian electronic music producer. He is best known for the song "snowfall" with Reidenshi, which has amassed over 1.2 billion streams on Spotify as of September 2026. In 2023, he signed with Monstercat Silk and released the single "restless" with Kazukii. In 2024, he made the Grammy longlist for the Best New Age Album with the album Midnight Journey, but didn't make the final list of nominees.

== Biography ==
Volynkin was born in 2006 in Kirsanov, Tambov Oblast. His mother was a lawyer, and his father was a journalist and a musician under the pseudonym Leadwave. Volynkin began attending music school at age 9, laying the foundation for his compositional skills, which he actively developed with FL Studio. Volynkin first began producing music at age 11, inspired by electronic music and musicians such as Martin Garrix, Don Diablo, KSHMR, and the Russian rock band Tantsy Minus. His initial work was in the lo-fi genre. In 2022, he broke through with the release of the track "snowfall", which went viral on social media platforms such as TikTok and Instagram.

The pseudonym "Øneheart" was invented by Volynkin, intending that his stage name begin with "one". However, since the variant "Oneheart" was already taken, he decided to replace the letter "O" with the symbol "Ø", a Latin-script letter used in the Danish and Norwegian alphabets.

The track "snowfall", co-written with Eugene Chirkov ("reidenshi"), has garnered over 1.1 billion streams on Spotify. Volynkin was noted as one of the most listened to Russian musicians with an audience of over 8.5 million listeners per month. His music was combined with visual content, especially videos of natural landscapes, helping viral distribution in TikTok and YouTube Shorts. Volynkin continues to experiment with different genres, although his music is mostly associated with the ambient genre. He draws inspiration for his tracks from the nature of his native region.

== Discography ==
=== Albums ===
- Dreamscape (2020)
- Lifeglow (2023)
- Midnight Journey (2024; with Antent and Dean Korso)
- Boyhood (2024)
- Samsara Passengers (2025; with Dean Korso and leadwave)

=== EPs ===
- Broken (2023)
- Tapeloops (2024)
- Tales (2024, with Antent)
- Wasted (2025)
- Find Yourself (2026)

=== Singles ===
- "snowfall" (2022)
