= Josh Fawaz =

Australian DJ and producer

- Occupations: Singer; music producer; DJ
- Years active: 2015–present

Josh Fawaz is an Australian music producer and disc jockey.

In 2026, his version of Madonna's "Like a Prayer" charted in Australia and the United Kingdom, receiving commercial radio support in Australia. Following its commercial success, the release attracted media commentary and online industry discussions regarding whether the music and artist excessively utilised generative artificial intelligence tools, with Brennen Kelly of Whiskey Riff calling Fawaz "completely AI".

== Career ==
Fawaz's debut release "Bubble Goose" was released in 2015.

Fawaz began releasing music in the 2010s. His early releases included original dance and electronic productions before he gained broader attention for club-focused versions of well-known songs.

In 2026, Fawaz released "Like a Prayer". On 22 May 2026, Fawaz released the six-track EP Dance Like Nobody's Watching under the Hallwood label. Industry publications and music commentators have highlighted Fawaz's output as part of a growing wave of artificial intelligence-generated music on streaming platforms, with critics noting the entirely synthetic nature of the project's production and vocal arrangements. On 26 June 2026, the EP was extended to 14 tracks and released as an album titled Dance Like Everyone's Watching.

In August 2026, Australian Recording Industry Association (ARIA) announced that songs that are largely or wholly created by AI would be banned from Australia's music charts.

== Discography ==
=== Albums ===
List of albums, with selected details and chart positions
Title	Album details	Peak chart positions
Title	Album details	AUS Artist Dance
Dance Like Everyone's Watching	Released: 26 June 2026; Format: digital; Label: Hallwood (8721555466784)	5

=== Extended plays ===
List of albums, with selected details and chart positions
Title	Album details	Peak chart positions	
Title	Album details	AUS Artist	AUS Artist Dance
Dance Like Nobody's Watching	Released: 22 May 2026; Format: digital; Label: Hallwood (825200500842)	14	3

=== Charted singles ===
List of singles, with selected chart positions
Title	Year	Peak chart positions									Album or EP
Title	Year	AUS	CIS Air.	EST Air.	KAZ Air.	LTU Air.	ROU Air.	UKR Air.	UK	US Dance/ Elec.	Album or EP
"Like a Prayer"	2026	67	166	70	38	59	70	93	63	4	Dance Like Nobody's Watching
"Too Close"	2026	—	—	—	—	—	—	—	—	— (Note: "Too Close" did not enter the Hot Dance/Electronic Songs chart, but peaked at number 11 on the Dance Digital Song Sales chart.)	Dance Like Nobody's Watching
"—" denotes a recording that did not chart or was not released in that territory.
