= You Got It (Vedo song) =

2020 single by Vedo

Single by Vedo

from the album For You
- Released: March 5, 2020
- Genre: R&B
- Length: 3:23
- Label: Island Prolific; New Wav; Empire
- Songwriter: Wilbart McCoy III
- Producers: Paul Cabbin; Tariq Beats

Vedo singles chronology
"Computer Luv" (2020)	"You Got It" (2020)	"Pu$$y Fairy (OTW)" (2020)

Music video
- "You Got It" on YouTube

"You Got It" is a song by American singer Vedo, released on March 5, 2020 as the third single from his sixth studio album For You (2020). Produced by Paul Cabbin and Tariq Beats, it gained traction on the video-sharing app TikTok. The music samples Janet Jackson's 1997 hit "I Get Lonely".

== Background ==
Vedo revealed his reason for writing the song in an interview with Genius: "Everything we was going through as a people, I felt like we needed a record that would basically motivate people to get back on their grind and just boss up and get it back together. But I wanted to do it in a way that wasn't corny." He further explained to Starry Constellation Magazine, "I was hoping that it would be an inspiration for everyone, not just women. However, as an R&B artist, of course it was written with a woman in mind. With so many negative stereotypes toward women in the media, I felt like this song was needed, which is why I think it took off the way that it has."

In regard to creating the song, Vedo told Flaunt:

"You Got It" was one of the last songs I did on the album. My producer homie sent the beat and I instantly loved it. I needed a song that uplifted women and encouraged women on the album. At the time getting ready to release the album, it's this big deal about women's empowerment. I wanted something to go hand in hand with the movement and be able to touch people. I uploaded the beat to Pro Tools and I started freestyling. I freestyled 60% of the song, from the first verse through the pre-hook. I knew this song had to be along the lines of bossing up, encouraging people to fix your credit. Real motivational, but not corny at the same time.

The song gained broad recognition through going viral on TikTok.

== Critical reception ==
Jon Caramanica of The New York Times included "You Got It" in his list of the best songs that found popularity on TikTok in 2020, describing it as "A sturdily written, crisply sung song about the restorative power of nurturing love. Honest! A cleansing remedy for a year light on sincerity, emotional safety and great, old-fashioned R&B."

== Remixes ==
Three official remixes of the song have been released. The first features American singer Ty Dolla Sign and was released on November 20, 2020 exclusively on Amazon Music, before being released to other streaming services on December 17, 2021. The second remix, featuring American rappers Young Dolph and Money Man, was released on December 18, 2020. The third remix features American singer Yung Bleu and was released on April 9, 2021.

== Charts ==
Chart (2020–2021)	Peak position
UK Singles (OCC)	64
US Billboard Hot 100	75
US R&B/Hip-Hop Airplay (Billboard)	11

== Certifications ==
Region	Certification	Certified units/sales
United States (RIAA)	2× Platinum	2,000,000^{‡}
^{‡} Sales+streaming figures based on certification alone.
