= 17 Million Fuck Offs =

2019 British comedy folk song

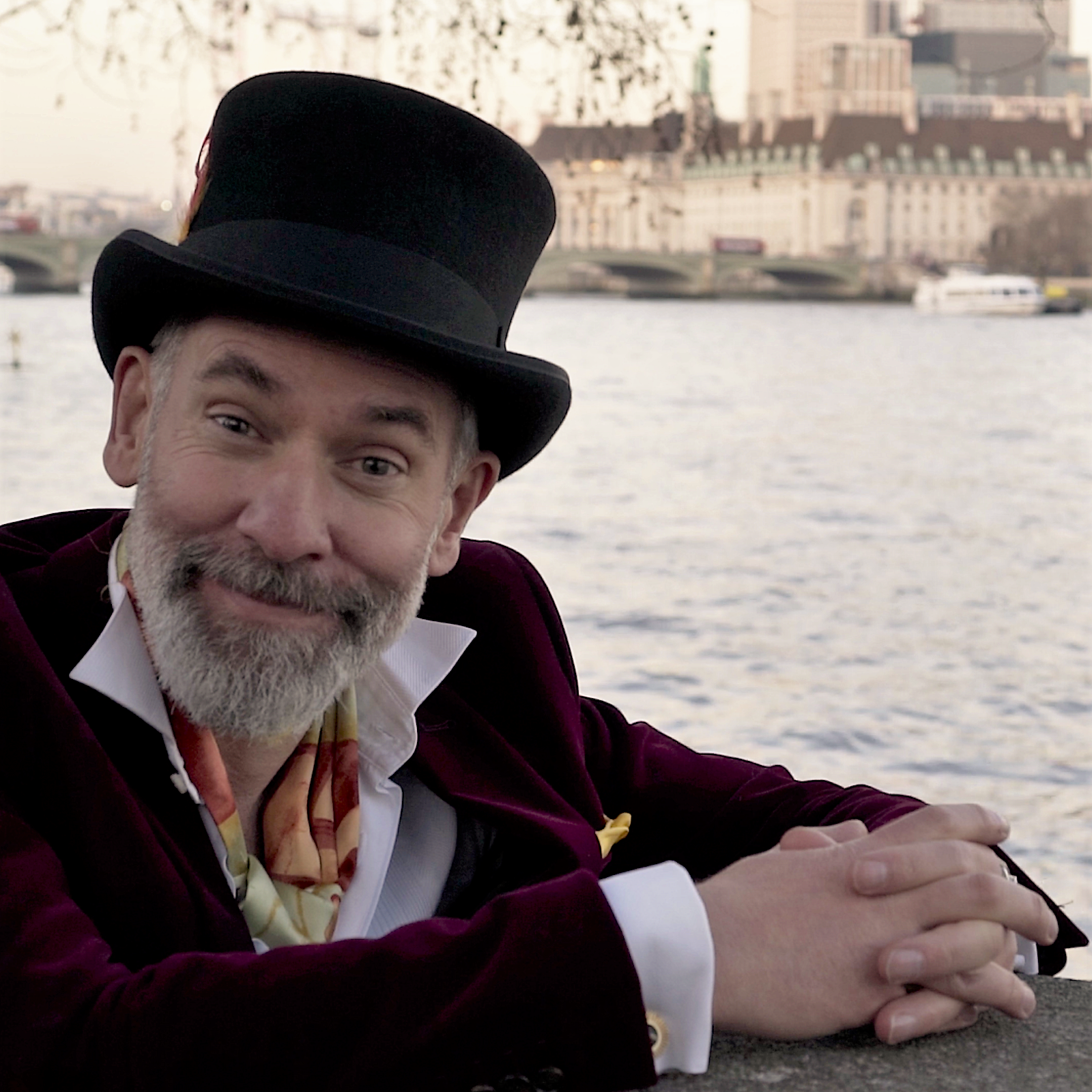
- Dominic Frisby filming the video for 17 Million Fuck-Offs

Single by Dominic Frisby

from the album Libertarian Love Songs
- Released: March 2019
- Genre: Folk; comedy
- Songwriter(s): Dominic Frisby

Music video
- "17 Million Fuck-Offs (2020 update)" on YouTube

"17 Million Fuck Offs", also censored as "17 Million F**k-Offs", is a 2019 British comedy folk song by Dominic Frisby. The song was written to commemorate the approximate number of the 17.4 million people who voted for the United Kingdom to leave the European Union in the 2016 United Kingdom European Union membership referendum. The song was first released on 4 March 2019 then re-released with an updated version in December 2019, where it reached number 43 on the UK Singles Charts. The song itself is set to the old English folk tune of Widecombe Fair.

== Background and release ==
Frisby wrote "17 Million Fuck Offs" as a protest song.

=== Re-release ===
Due to delays in Brexit with a new date being set for 31 January 2020 after a delay of seven months from 31 March 2019, Frisby updated the song in December 2019 by adding a verse that covered the result of the 2019 United Kingdom general election. Frisby had been due to stand as a Brexit Party candidate in the election but withdrew. In 2020, Frisby started a campaign to get "17 Million Fuck Offs" to number 1 in the UK Singles Chart. During the run-up to the day of Brexit, pro-EU activists started a counter-campaign for people to buy copies of Ludwig van Beethoven's "Ode to Joy" (used as the EU anthem) performed by André Rieu. When the charts were released, "Ode to Joy" reached 30 while "17 Million Fuck Offs" reached 43.

Frisby was invited by Leave Means Leave to perform at their Brexit celebration in Parliament Square on Brexit Day on 31 January. During the performance, Frisby sang "17 Million Fuck Offs" but he was told that he could not sing the phrase: "fuck off" on the stage as that would have been a public order offence. Instead he had the crowd sing the phrase.
