= The 740 Project =

American music firm

- Industry: Music · Entertainment
- Founded: 2015
- Founder: Rahim Wright · Jesse Edwards · Charley Greenberg
- Partner: Capitol Music Group
- Headquarters: Los Angeles, California, United States
- Area Served: Worldwide
- Divisions: Digital Marketing · Record Label · Creative Development · A&R · Publishing · Distribution · Agency · Management
- Associated Acts: Digital Trapstars
- Website: 740 Project

740 Project is a music marketing firm and recording label co-founded by Rahim Wright, Jesse Edwards, and Charley Greenberg in 2015. Based in Los Angeles, California the external services provided by the company increase music labels efforts to detect, develop, and introduce new artists. 740 Project is partnered with Capitol Music Group.

740 Project has been associated with the introduction and emergence of recording artists such as Bryson Tiller, Kiiara, Migos, Kevin Gates, Lil Yachty, and Lil Uzi Vert. Other clients include, Maybach Music Group, Sean Kingston, Justine Skye, Vic Mensa, Rich the Kid, Timbaland, K Camp, Young Money, Quality Control, and Kevin Gates.

== History ==
740 Project was founded by colleagues and personal associates: Jesse Edwards, Rahim Wright and Charley Greenberg. Edwards and Wright—while working at Warner Music Group—collaborated and initiated a digital marketing company in 2015. Sharing an office on the 28th floor of Atlantic Records, Wright and Edwards focused on developing a comprehensive urban roster for Atlantic Records and grew tired of "…updating Facebook pages and figuring out ways to partner with RapGenius." While working, the founders of 740 Project each built up rosters independently of one another and of their workplace responsibilities. Each founding member built relationships with emerging artists, creating an accessible network access point for the process of receiving and sharing unreleased music online. After their personal business became lucrative enough, Wright and Edwards subsequently joined Charley Greenberg, officially forming 740 Project.

In 2017, 740 Project announced a non-exclusive partnership with Capitol Music Group settled for the purpose of increasing Capitol's urban roster and presence. Capitol attempted to enter the urban market for years, as expressed by Capitol CEO, Steve Barnett (music executive), after Ethiopia Habtemariam arrived with Motown in the year 2014, “…Capitol hadn't been in the urban business for probably 25 years from a real commitment point of view." While 740 Project continues to work with independent and signed artists globally, this specific partnership allowed 740 Project to increase Capitol Music Group's urban presence by providing artists signed to the CMG family of labels, among them Motown, Quality Control, Capitol Records and Priority. 740 Project operates as a cultural architect, yielding the introduction of new urban artists to Capitol Music Group while current CMG urban artists progress in new directions. Separate from positioning 740 Project as the in-house urban marketing arm for record labels under CMG, this partnership permitted 740 Project to maintain its own record label imprint under Capitol Music Group.

== Digital Marketing ==
In a 2017 Billboard article, 740 Project was named one of Hip Hops "leading crews" in Los Angeles, California for honing in on the Hip Hop culture and introducing artists digitally. 740 Project introduces artists to an audience through online blog and website exclusives. In an article he wrote for The Fader, Wright highlights various steps an artist can take to increase their chances of becoming successful in receiving a blog post that could increase the audience of their music.

=== Digital Trapstars ===
With the objective of preserving urban culture, Wright and Edwards developed an independent digital marketing and distribution unit called Digital Trapstars. Digital Trapstars has supported and developed the careers of various artists including Rich The Kid, Migos, and Kevin Gates.

Under Digital Trapstars, 740 Project has released four mixtapes titled "Screens On Lock" that feature a number of exclusives from a variety of artists. These tapes were created to consist of recently released tracks that became hits. Along with the mixtapes, the company hosts shows and events in collaboration with SXSW and No Jumper to showcase featured artists

== Artists ==
A few of the past and current 740 Project clients.

- A-Trak
- Ace Hood
- Akon
- Auburn
- Austin Millz
- Beats By Dre
- Birdman
- B-Legit
- Brandy
- Bryson Tiller
- Capitol Music Group
- Chief Keef
- Cuban Doll
- Curren$y
- Diamond
- Digital Trapstars
- DJ Drama
- DJ Holiday
- DJ Infamous
- DJ Khaled
- DJ Paul
- Dougie F
- Drake
- Drumma Boy
- E-40
- Fat Joe
- Fetty Brothers
- Future
- Gorilla Zoe
- Gucci Mane
- H.E.R.
- Jadakiss
- Jeezy
- Justine Skye
- K Michelle
- K Camp
- Kane Beatz
- Kevin Gates
- Kiiara
- Kirko Bangz
- Lil Baby
- Lil Boosie
- Lil Durk
- Lil Jon
- Lil Scrappy
- Lil Uzi Vert
- Lil Wayne
- Lil Yachty
- Marvelous J
- Maybach Music Group
- Meek Mill
- Messy Marv
- Method Man
- Mike Epps
- Migos
- Mishon Ratliff
- Money Man
- Monica
- NBA YoungBoy
- Nicki Minaj
- OG Maco
- Pastor Troy
- Plies
- PnB Rock
- Priority Records
- Quality Control
- Ray J
- Rich The Kid
- Rick Ross
- Rochelle Jordan
- Rocko Da Don
- Rotimi
- SD
- Shy Glizzy
- Snoop Dogg
- Soulja Boy Tell'Em
- Suicide Boyz
- T.E.C. & Maine Musik
- T.I.
- T-Pain
- Taylor Gang
- Timbaland
- Trill Ent
- Trippie Redd
- TYuS
- Vic Mensa
- Wale
- Ya Boy
- YFN Lucci
- Yo Gotti
- Young Greatness
- Young Money
- Young Thug
- Yung Joc
- Zaytoven
