= Money Pit =

British television series

Money Pit is a British television series first broadcast on Dave in 2015. It is presented by Jason Manford and Dominic Frisby, and allows investors to support crowdfunded projects.

== Background ==
Money Pit is broadcast on Dave, presented by comedian Jason Manford and financial pundit Dominic Frisby, and narrated by Elizabeth Carling. The eight-part series explores the idea of crowdfunding, putting prospective investors in contact with those with business ideas. Crow TV was in charge of audio and video post, with production by Liberty Bell Productions, who have previously produced Dave Gorman: Modern Life is Goodish for Dave.

It was commissioned by Richard Watsham and Iain Coyle, with Liberty Bell's Charlie Anderson directing the series, Jamie Isaacs and Michele Carlisle executive producing the show. Filming took place at Alexandra Palace. The music for the series was composed by Kevin Kerrigan.

In an interview with Broadcast, series producer Pat Doyle described the show as a "legal minefield" due to crowdfunding being heavily regulated by the Financial Services Authority, and as such the show had to remain on middle ground.

== Format ==
Sixty prospective investors sit in the audience, with five contenders per episode. Each backer has submitted an amount of money into an escrow account, a communal pot. Each contender is given a couple of minutes to talk, after which a klaxon sounds and the investors are given time to fire questions at the contender, during which they reveal the sought amount followed by the incentive offered; this can be in the form of a percentage of the business, or in the form of rewards, such as "for £500 I offer a tour of the facility". After a while, trading time begins and each investor may submit investment to any contender that has pitched so far, possibly at the expense of investment submitted to other contenders. This process repeats itself five times. At the end of each show, only those contenders which have attained their target amount leave with any money.
