= GoodMorningTokyo! =

2019 single by Tokyo's Revenge

Single by Tokyo's Revenge

from the EP Mdnght (Side B)
- Released: October 18, 2019
- Genre: Hip hop
- Label: Blac Noize! Recordings
- Producer: Clifford "Cliiifford" Myrtil

Tokyo's Revenge singles chronology
"LooneyTunesFreestyle" (2019)	"GoodMorningTokyo!" (2019)	"Thot!" (2019)

"GoodMorningTokyo!" (stylised in all caps) is a single by American rapper Tokyo's Revenge, released by Blac Noize! Recordings on October 18, 2019 as the lead single from his second EP, Mdnght (Side B). The song peaked at No. 1 on the Bubbling Under Hot 100 and was certified gold by the RIAA.

== Background ==
Best created the song with producer Clifford "Cliiifford" Myrtil and features Best calling out phony artists. In 2019, Best became known with the song "Thot!" as it had become viral on TikTok, with fans using it for more than 200,000 videos. New fans then noticed "GoodMorningTokyo!" a year later and used it for 1.1 million videos, making it his most popular song. The song climbed up and topped both Spotify's Global Viral 50 and the Rolling Stone's Trending 25 at No. 1 and 2 respectively, accumulating 26 million streams on Spotify.

=== Music video ===
A music video for the song was released on February 17, 2020 and was directed by James "JMP" Pereira, edited by Chaz Smedley with cinematography by Russ Fraser. The music video was shot at Studios 60’s Grand 2 Stage in Los Angeles.

== Charts ==
Chart performance for "GoodMorningTokyo!"
Chart (2020)	Peak position
UK Singles (OCC)	74
US Bubbling Under Hot 100 (Billboard)	1

== Certifications ==
Certifications for "GoodMorningTokyo!"
Region	Certification	Certified units/sales
Brazil (Pro-Música Brasil)	Platinum	40,000^{‡}
United States (RIAA)	Gold	500,000^{‡}
^{‡} Sales+streaming figures based on certification alone.
