= DripReport =

Pakistani American singer

- Also known as: SoleDrip; CEO of Remixes
- Born: 2002 (age 23–24); United States
- Genres: Trap; hip hop
- Occupations: Singer; record producer; rapper
- Instruments: Piano; synthesizer; drums; bass
- Years active: 2018-present
- Labels: Sony Music; Arista Records

DripReport is an American music producer and singer. He is known for his Indian remixes of popular rap songs on YouTube. He further elevated to fame after his debut single "Skechers" went viral on TikTok and YouTube.

== Early life and career ==
DripReport's parents emigrated from Pakistan to America. He graduated high school and later dropped out of college to focus on his music career. DripReport's identity remains unknown.

He started by making remixes of popular rap/hip-hop songs and eventually launched his debut single in January 2020. His song "Skechers" became an internet sensation. It went viral on social media platforms, especially TikTok, where more than 2.7 million videos used it as a sound. The song has also crossed 450 million streams on Spotify. Two remixed versions of the song were released in 2020, one featuring Tyga, and another featuring Badshah. This song has also topped charts worldwide.

Most of DripReport's remixes on YouTube are copyrighted and therefore he cannot make money through them. DripReport received a major-label deal with Arista Records after his success with "Skechers". It is rumored that he signed a contract of over one million dollars.

== Discography ==
=== Singles ===
- Skechers - ft Carbine
- Poison
- Places
- Blinding Lights
- Lemonade
- Calvin Kleins
- Moonlight
- Shotta Flow
- Indian 223s
- Panini
- Faneto
- Tesla - ft. Kyduh
- Daddy

=== Remixes ===
- Tell em (remix) - $not, Cochise
- Skechers (remix) - ft. Badshah
- Way 2 Sexy (remix) - Drake ft. Future
- Die Very Rough (remix) - Mario Judah
- For the Night (remix) - Pop Smoke ft. Lil Baby & DaBaby
- Party Girl (remix) - StaySolidRocky
- Skechers (remix) - ft. Tyga
- Yummy (remix) - Justin Bieber
- Blinding Lights (remix) - The Weeknd
- The Box (remix) - Roddy Ricch
- Highest in the Room (remix) - Travis Scott
- Pop Out (remix) - Polo G, Lil Tjay
- Ransom (remix) - Lil Tecca

== See also ==
- Dhruv Sharma
