= Snowfall (song) =

Single by Øneheart and Reidenshi
- Released: January 14, 2022
- Genre: Dark ambient
- Length: 2:04
- Label: Dreamscape
- Songwriters: Dmitry Volynkin; Eugene Chirkov
- Producers: Øneheart; Reidenshi

Øneheart singles chronology
"Lights on Me" (2022)	"Snowfall" (2022)	"Faded" (2022)

Reidenshi singles chronology
"Ocean of Memories" (2021)	"Snowfall" (2022)	"November 8" (2022)

"Snowfall" is a song by the Russian musicians Øneheart and Reidenshi, released as a single on January 14, 2022, through Dreamscape. It went viral on social media platforms such as TikTok and Instagram. By May 2023, the song had surpassed over 100 million Spotify streams and appeared in more than 500,000 TikTok videos and 400,000 Instagram reels.

== Chart performance ==
Chart performance for "Snowfall"
Chart (2023–24)	Peak position
Switzerland (Schweizer Hitparade)	51
UK Singles (Official Charts)	57
UK Indie (Official Charts)	15

== Certifications ==
Certifications for "Snowfall"
Region	Certification	Certified units/sales
New Zealand (RMNZ)	Platinum	30,000^{‡}
United Kingdom (BPI)	Gold	400,000^{‡}
United States (RIAA)	2× Platinum	2,000,000^{‡}
^{‡} Sales+streaming figures based on certification alone.
