= Yelawolf discography =

Rap rock recording artist discography

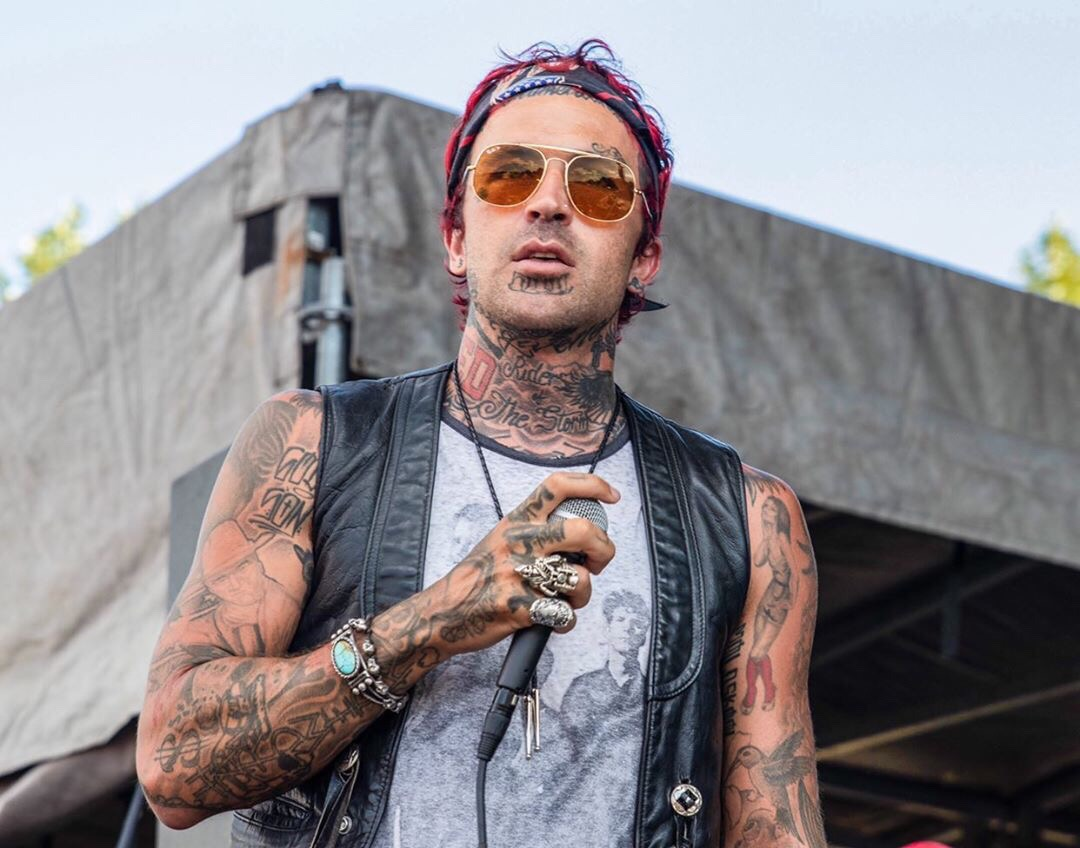
- Yelawolf at Blueridgerockfest in 2019
- Studio albums: 8
- Extended plays: 9
- Singles: 50
- Music videos: 82
- Mixtapes: 6
- Collaborative albums: 6

The discography of American rapper Yelawolf consists of eight studio albums, six collaborative albums, six mixtapes, nine EPs, 50 singles (including sixteen as a featured artist) and 82 music videos. His music has been released on record labels Interscope Records, Shady Records and DGC Records, including independent record label Ghet-O-Vision and Slumerican which has released some of his independent material.

== Albums ==
=== Studio albums ===
List of studio albums, with selected chart positions and sales figures
Title	Album details	Peak chart positions									Certifications
Title	Album details	US	US R&B/ HH	US Rap	AUS	BEL (FL)	GER	NZ	SWI	UK	Certifications
Creek Water	Released: June 23, 2005; Label: Self-released; Formats: CD, digital download	—	—	—	—	—	—	—	—	—	
Radioactive	Released: November 21, 2011; Label: Ghet-O-Vision, Shady, DGC, Interscope; Formats: CD, LP, digital download	27	6	4	—	—	—	—	81	—	
Love Story	Released: April 21, 2015; Label: Slumerican, Shady, Interscope; Formats: CD, LP, digital download	3	1	1	19	85	51	18	13	25	RIAA: Gold
Trial by Fire	Released: October 27, 2017; Label: Slumerican, Shady, Interscope; Formats: CD, LP, digital download	42	23	18	41	—	—	40	76	—	
Trunk Muzik 3	Released: March 29, 2019; Label: Slumerican, Shady, Interscope; Formats: CD, LP, digital download	28	17	17	34	—	—	19	60	—	
Ghetto Cowboy	Released: November 1, 2019; Label: Slumerican; Formats: CD, LP, digital download	76	40	—	60	—	—	30	—	—	
Mud Mouth	Released: April 30, 2021; Label: Slumerican; Formats: CD, LP, digital download	—	—	—	—	—	—	—	—	—	
War Story	Released: June 7, 2024; Label: Slumerican; Formats: CD, LP, digital download	—	—	—	—	—	—	—	—	—	
"—" denotes a recording that did not chart or was not released in that territory

=== Collaborative albums ===
List of albums, with selected chart positions, sales figures and certifications
Title	Album details	Peak chart positions								Sales	Certifications
Title	Album details	US	US R&B/ HH	US Rap	BEL (FL)	CAN	GER	SWI	UK	Sales	Certifications
Shady XV (as part of Shady Records)	Released: November 24, 2014; Label: Shady, Interscope; Formats: CD, LP, digital download	3	1	1	26	1	8	7	5	US: 290,000; CAN: 21,000	RIAA: Gold
Yelawolf Blacksheep (with Caskey)	Released: February 19, 2021; Label: Slumerican, Black Sheep Records; Formats: CD, digital download, streaming	—	—	—	—	—	—	—	—		
Turquoise Tornado (with Riff Raff)	Released: April 9, 2021; Label: Slumerican, Million Dollar Mullet Music; Formats: CD, digital download	—	—	—	—	—	—	—	—		
Mile Zero (with DJ Muggs)	Released: April 23, 2021; Label: Slumerican, Soul Assassins; Formats: CD, LP, digital download	—	—	—	—	—	—	—	—		
Sometimes Y (with Shooter Jennings)	Released: March 11, 2022; Label: Slumerican; Formats: CD, LP, digital download	—	—	—	—	—	—	—	—		
Whiskey & Roses (with J. Michael Phillips)	Released: July 11, 2025; Label: Slumerican; Formats: CD, LP, digital download	—	—	—	—	—	—	—	—		
"—" denotes a recording that did not chart or was not released in that territory.

== Extended plays ==
List of extended plays, with selected chart positions and sales figures
Title	Album details	Peak chart positions		
Title	Album details	US	US R&B/ HH	US Rap
Arena Rap	Released: December 28, 2008; Label: Ghet-O-Vision, Redd Klay; Formats: CD, digital download	—	—	—
Trunk Muzik 0-60	Released: November 22, 2010; Label: Ghet-O-Vision, DGC, Interscope; Formats: CD, digital download	—	36	16
The Slumdon Bridge (with Ed Sheeran)	Released: February 14, 2012; Label: Warner; Formats: digital download	—	74	—
Psycho White (with Travis Barker)	Released: November 13, 2012; Label: LaSalle, Famous Stars and Straps, Killer Distribution; Formats: CD, digital download	49	7	3
Black Fall (with DJ Paul)	Released: October 31, 2013; Label: Slumerican; Format: digital download	—	—	—
Hotel	Released: October 10, 2016; Label: Slumerican; Format: digital download	—	—	—
Catfish Billy x Cub Cook Up Boss (EP) (as Catfish Billy, CookUpBoss)	Released: November 18, 2017; Label: Slumerican; Formats: CD, digital download	—	—	—
Catfish Billy x Cub Cook Up Boss Slum Trap (as Catfish Billy, CookUpBoss)	Released: November 29, 2019; Label: Slumerican, Shifelife Records LLC; Formats: CD, digital download	—	—	—
Slumafia (with DJ Paul)	Released: April 16, 2021; Label: Slumerican; Formats: CD, LP, digital download	—	—	—
"—" denotes a recording that did not chart or was not released in that territory.

== Mixtapes ==
List of mixtapes, with year released
Title	Album details
Pissin' in a Barrel of Beez	Released: 2005; Label: Self-released; Format: digital download
Ball of Flames: The Ballad of Slick Rick E. Bobby	Released: November 17, 2007; Label: Self-released; Format: digital download
Stereo: A Hip-Hop Tribute To Classic Rock	Released: November 17, 2008; Label: Ghet-O-Vision, Redd Klay; Format: digital download
Trunk Muzik	Released: January 1, 2010; Label: Ghet-O-Vision; Format: digital download
Heart of Dixie	Released: July 4, 2012; Label: Slumerican; Format: digital download
Trunk Muzik Returns	Released: March 14, 2013; Label: Slumerican, SupaHotBeats; Format: digital download

== Singles ==
=== As lead artist ===
List of singles, with selected chart positions, showing year released and album name
Title	Year	Peak chart positions								Certifications	Album
Title	Year	US	US R&B/ HH	US Rap	AUS	BEL (FL)	CAN	NZ Hot	SWE	Certifications	Album
"Pop the Trunk"	2010	—	—	—	—	—	—	—	—	RIAA: Gold; RMNZ: Gold	Trunk Muzik 0-60
"I Just Wanna Party" (featuring Gucci Mane)	2010	—	— (Note: "I Just Wanna Party" did not enter the Hot R&B/Hip-Hop Songs chart, but peaked at number nine on the Bubbling Under R&B/Hip-Hop Singles.)	—	—	—	—	—	—		Trunk Muzik 0-60
"Daddy's Lambo"	2010	—	—	—	—	—	—	—	—	RIAA: Gold; RMNZ: Gold	Trunk Muzik 0-60
"Hard White (Up in the Club)" (featuring Lil Jon)	2011	—	— (Note: "Hard White (Up in the Club)" did not enter the Hot R&B/Hip-Hop Songs chart, but peaked at number 14 on the Bubbling Under R&B/Hip-Hop Singles.)	—	—	—	—	—	—		Radioactive
"Let's Roll" (featuring Kid Rock)	2011	—	— (Note: "Let's Roll" did not enter the Hot R&B/Hip-Hop Songs chart, but peaked at number 24 on the Bubbling Under R&B/Hip-Hop Singles.)	—	—	—	—	—	—	RIAA: Gold	Radioactive
"You Don't Know (For F*uck's Sake)" (with Ed Sheeran)	2012	—	—	—	—	—	—	—	—		The Slumdon Bridge
"Father's Day"	2012	—	—	—	—	—	—	—	—		Heart of Dixie
"Push 'Em" (with Travis Barker)	2012	—	—	—	—	—	—	—	—		Psycho White
"Way Out"	2013	—	—	—	—	—	—	—	—		Trunk Muzik Returns
"F.A.S.T Ride"	2013	—	—	—	—	—	—	—	—		Trunk Muzik Returns
"Gangsta" (featuring A$AP Rocky and Big Henry)	2013	—	—	—	—	—	—	—	—		Trunk Muzik Returns
"Box Chevy V"	2014	—	—	—	—	—	—	—	—	RMNZ: Gold	Love Story
"Honey Brown"	2014	—	—	—	—	—	—	—	—		Non-album single
"Till It's Gone"	2014	— (Note: "Till It's Gone" did not enter the Billboard Hot 100 chart, but peaked at number seven on the Bubbling Under Hot 100 Singles.)	35	20	70	—	67	—	88	RIAA: Platinum; RMNZ: Platinum; GLF: Platinum	Love Story
"Whiskey in a Bottle"	2015	—	—	—	—	—	—	—	—		Love Story
"American You"	2015	—	—	—	—	—	89	—	—	RMNZ: Gold	Love Story
"Best Friend" (featuring Eminem)	2015	— (Note: "Best Friend" did not enter the Billboard Hot 100 chart, but peaked at number three on the Bubbling Under Hot 100 Singles.)	36	—	—	— (Note: "Best Friend" did not enter the Flanders Ultratop 50 chart, but peaked at number 78 on the Ultratip chart)	51	—	—	RIAA: Platinum; RMNZ: Platinum	Love Story
"Out of Control" (with Travis Barker)	2016	—	—	—	—	—	—	—	—		Non-album single
"Daylight"	2016	—	— (Note: "Daylight" did not enter the Hot R&B/Hip-Hop Songs chart, but peaked at number ten on the Bubbling Under R&B/Hip-Hop Singles chart.)	—	—	—	—	—	—		Trial by Fire
"Shadows" (featuring Joshua Hedley)	2016	—	—	—	—	—	—	—	—		Trial by Fire
"Row Your Boat"	2017	—	—	—	—	—	—	—	—		Trial by Fire
"Punk" (featuring Travis Barker and Juicy J)	2017	—	—	—	—	—	—	—	—		Trial by Fire
"Get Mine" (featuring Kid Rock)	2017	—	—	—	—	—	—	—	—		Trial by Fire
"TM3"	2019	—	—	—	—	—	—	—	—		Trunk Muzik 3
"Catfish Billy 2"	2019	—	—	—	—	—	—	32	—	RMNZ: Gold	Trunk Muzik 3
"Unnatural Born Killer"	2019	—	—	—	—	—	—	—	—		Ghetto Cowboy
"Opie Taylor"	2019	—	—	—	—	—	—	—	—		Ghetto Cowboy
"You and Me"	2019	—	—	—	—	—	—	—	—	RIAA: Gold; RMNZ: Gold	Ghetto Cowboy
"Been a Problem" (with Caskey)	2021	—	—	—	—	—	—	—	—		Yelawolf Blacksheep
"Open" (with Caskey featuring DJ Paul)	2021	—	—	—	—	—	—	—	—		Yelawolf Blacksheep
"Get Rich or Go Broke" (Remix) (with Bub Styles and ARXV)	2021	—	—	—	—	—	—	—	—		Non-album singles
"All on Three" (featuring Baldacci)	2021	—	—	—	—	—	—	—	—		Non-album singles
"Make Me a Believer" (with Shooter Jennings)	2022	—	—	—	—	—	—	—	—		Sometimes Y
"Rock & Roll Baby" (with Shooter Jennings)	2022	—	—	—	—	—	—	—	—		Sometimes Y
"Jump Out the Window" (with Shooter Jennings)	2022	—	—	—	—	—	—	—	—		Sometimes Y
"Everything"	2024	—	—	—	—	—	—	—	—		War Story
"Make You Love Me"	2024	—	—	—	—	—	—	—	—		War Story
"New Me"	2024	—	—	—	—	—	—	—	—		War Story
"Trailer in the Sky" (with Jelly Roll)	2024	—	—	—	—	—	—	30	—		War Story
"My Country"	2026	—	—	—	—	—	—	35	—		Non-album single
"—" denotes a recording that did not chart or was not released in that territory.

=== As featured artist ===
List of singles, with selected chart positions, showing year released and album name
Title	Year	Peak chart positions			Album
Title	Year	US	US R&B/ HH	US Rap	Album
"I Run" (Slim Thug featuring Yelawolf)	2008	—	49	20	Boss of All Bosses
"Worldwide Choppers" (Tech N9ne featuring Ceza, JL B.Hood, U$O, Yelawolf, Twista, Busta Rhymes, D-Loc and Twisted Insane)	2011	— (Note: "Worldwide Choppers" did not enter the Billboard Hot 100 chart, but peaked at number four on the Bubbling Under Hot 100 Singles.)	—	—	All 6's and 7's
"Let's Go" (Travis Barker featuring Lil Jon, Busta Rhymes, Twista and Yelawolf)	2011	— (Note: "Let's Go" did not enter the Billboard Hot 100 chart, but peaked at number 19 on the Bubbling Under Hot 100 Singles.)	—	—	Give the Drummer Some
"Cuz I'm Famous" (Travis Barker featuring Paul Wall, Hopsin and Yelawolf)	2013	—	—	—	Non-album single
"Go Hard" (Da Mafia 6ix featuring Yelawolf)	2013	—	—	—	6ix Commandments
"You Little Man" (Struggle Jennings featuring Yelawolf)	2017	—	—	—	Non-album singles
"Im So Juiced Up" (DJ Paul featuring Seed of 6ix, DJ Ease and Yelawolf)	2019	—	—	—	Non-album singles
"Wake up Call" (Rittz featuring Twista and Yelawolf)	2019	—	—	—	Put a Crown on It
"Million Dollar Mullet" (Riff Raff featuring Yelawolf)	2020	—	—	—	Non-album singles
"The Devil Went Down to Georgia" (Korn featuring Yelawolf)	2020	—	—	—	Non-album singles
"McQueen Fiend" (Remix) (Caskey featuring Yelawolf)	2020	—	—	—	Non-album singles
"Big Dreamz" (Outlaw Mel featuring The Outfit, TX and Yelawolf)	2020	—	—	—	Non-album singles
"Million Dollar Mullet" (ChopNotSlop Remix) (Riff Raff featuring Ronny J, OG Ron C and Yelawolf)	2021	—	—	—	Non-album singles
"Tip Toe 4" (Riff Raff featuring Yelawolf)	2021	—	—	—	Non-album singles
"Moss" (Remix) (Riff Raff featuring Nakani and Yelawolf)	2021	—	—	—	Non-album singles
"Mafia Family" (Seed of 6ix featuring DJ Paul and Yelawolf)	2021	—	—	—	Non-album singles
"—" denotes a recording that did not chart or was not released in that territory.

== Other charted songs ==
List of singles, with selected chart positions, showing year released and album name
Title	Year	Peak chart positions			Certifications	Album
Title	Year	US	US R&B/ HH	US Rap	Certifications	Album
"1 Train" (ASAP Rocky featuring Kendrick Lamar, Joey Badass, Yelawolf, Danny Brown, Action Bronson and Big K.R.I.T.)	2013	— (Note: "1 Train" did not enter the Billboard Hot 100, but peaked at number three on the Bubbling Under Hot 100 Singles chart.)	31	25	RIAA: Gold; RMNZ: Gold	Long. Live. ASAP
"Twisted" (with Skylar Grey and Eminem)	2014	—	— (Note: "Twisted" did not enter the Hot R&B/Hip-Hop Songs chart, but peaked at number six on the Bubbling Under R&B/Hip-Hop Singles chart.)	—		Shady XV
"—" denotes a recording that did not chart or was not released in that territory.

== Guest appearances ==
List of non-single guest appearances, with other performing artists, showing year released and album name
Title	Year	Other artist(s)	Album
"Rocketman"	2009	Prof, St. Paul Slim	Recession Music
"Looking for a Change"	2009	Alex King, Sonny Bama	Reincarnated
"Like a Sewing Machine"	2009	Alex King, Struggle	Reincarnated
"Mixin' Up the Medicine"	2009	Juelz Santana	—N/a
"Country Cool" (Remix)	2009	Donnis, Pill	—N/a
"Who's Hood"	2009	G-Side	Huntsville International
"Down this Road"	2010	Bizarre	Friday Night at St. Andrews
"You Ain't No DJ"	2010	Big Boi	Sir Lucious Left Foot: The Son of Chico Dusty
"Crazy Girlz"	2010	Dreamer	Live in Stereo 2.0
"Cutlass"	2010	Glamourlyke	Highway Love
"Look The Other Way"	2010	Skapezilla, Note, Young Trimm	Bass Wars
"Bring The Money Home"	2010	Feroz	Invisible Man
"I'm A Freek"	2010	Henny, Pill	—N/a
"Go Crazy"	2010	Rich Boy	—N/a
"How Low" (Remix)	2010	Ludacris, Rock City	—N/a
"Suicide" (Remix)	2010	Neako, Smoke DZA, Shawn Chrystopher, Phil Adé, Stalley	Live in Stereo 2.0
"Live It"	2010	Paul Wall, Jay Electronica, Raekwon	Heart of a Champion
"Deer Mama"	2011	SMKA	The 808 Experiment (Vol. 2)
"Smell My Cologne"	2011	Big Hud	Smell My Cologne EP
"Turn It Up"	2011	Emilio Rojas	Life Without Shame
"Electric Kingdom"	2011	Article	Nobody Cares
"Buss It"	2011	Hollyweerd	On the Road to #Hollyville
"Take Em To..."	2011	Thee Tom Hardy	The Hardy Boy Mystery Mixtape: Secret of Thee Green Magic
"2.0 Boys"	2011	Eminem, Slaughterhouse	—N/a
"Black And White Flags"	2011	Dixie Mafia	—N/a
"Outlaw Shit"	2011	Struggle Jennings, Waylon Jennings	I Am Struggle
"Bulletproof"	2011	Cyhi the Prynce	Royal Flush II
"Rough"	2011	Game	Hoodmorning (notypo): Candy Coronas
"Push It"	2011	Jessie and The Toy Boys	Show Me Your Tan Lines
"Hello Sunshine"	2011	STS	The Illustrious
"Lites On"	2011	P. Watts	Elements of Surprise
"Make Some Noise (Put 'Em Up)"	2011	The Crystal Method	Real Steel
"Full of Shit"	2011	Rittz, Big K.R.I.T.	White Jesus
"Sleep at Night"	2011	Rittz	White Jesus
"Shit Done Got Real"	2011	Ace Hood, Busta Rhymes	The Statement 2
"Empty Town"	2011	GLC, Coldhard, The Carps	Eternal Sunshine of the Pimpin' Mind
"Too Turnt Up"	2011	Gucci Mane	Writing's on the Wall 2
"Hall Pass"	2012	Kydd Jones	The Sounds In My Head (Part II)
"Immaculate Perception"	2012	8Ball, Waka Flocka Flame	Premro
"No Hands"	2012	Track Bangas	The Reagan Era
"Shit I've Seen"	2012	Track Bangas, Trae tha Truth, Chamillionaire	The Reagan Era
"Lemonade"	2012	Cisco Adler, Dirt Nasty, Johnny Polygon	Aloha
"Dollar General"	2012	Stevie Stone	Rollin' Stone
"One On One"	2012	Jasmine Solano	RAP
"Cheated"	2012	Trouble Andrew	—N/a
"Satellites"	2012	Struggle Jennings, Zilla	—N/a
"New Kid"	2012	Prof	Kaiser Von Powderhorn 3
"Smoke & Drank"	2012	CyHi the Prynce, Big K.R.I.T.	Ivy League Club
"Far From a Bitch"	2012	Big Hud, Rittz, Struggle Jennings	The Long Way Home
"Smell My Cologne"	2012	Big Hud	The Long Way Home
"Pretty Little Girl"	2012	Blink-182	Dogs Eating Dogs
"1 Train"	2013	ASAP Rocky, Kendrick Lamar, Joey Bada$$, Danny Brown, Action Bronson, Big K.R.I.T.	Long. Live. ASAP
"Tha Package"	2013	Brotha Lynch Hung	Mannibalector
"Heaven"	2013	Rittz	The Life and Times of Jonny Valiant
"Yea That's Me" (Remix)	2013	Jackie Chain, Big K.R.I.T.	Bruce Lean Chronicles 2
"Hammertime"	2013	Rittz	—N/a
"Gun Plus a Mask"	2013	Juicy J	Stay Trippy
"Go Hard"	2013	Da Mafia 6ix	6ix Commandments
"Outlaw Sh*t"	2013	Struggle Jennings, Waylon Jennings	I Am Struggle
"I'm Hard"	2013	Pill	—N/a
"Legacy" (Remix)	2013	Fefe Dobson	—N/a
"ZEN"	2013	Mickey Factz	The Achievement
"Cuz Im Famous"	2013	Travis Barker, Paul Wall, Hopsin	—N/a
"Louder"	2014	InkMonstarr	—N/a
"So Long"	2014	Jelly Roll	The Biggest Loser
"The Hole"	2014	Hillbilly Casino	Live In The USA
"Reload"	2014	Kaleb D	—N/a
"Psychopath Killer"	2014	Eminem, Slaughterhouse	Shady XV
"Down"	2014	—N/a	Shady XV
"Twisted"	2014	Eminem, Skylar Grey	Shady XV
"LAF" (Remix)	2015	Rittz, Royce da 5'9", Crooked I	—N/a
"Thank You"	2015	WLPWR	Free Game
"F U 2"	2015	DJ Paul, Violent J	Master Of Evil
"Get Away"	2016	DJ Paul, Jon Connor	YOTS (Year Of The Six) Pt. 1
"Slumerican Three 6"	2016	DJ Paul	YOTS (Year Of The Six) Pt. 1
"Y.G.M.F.U."	2016	Bubba Sparxxx	The Bubba Mathis EP
"Put In Work"	2016	Bubba Sparxxx	The Bubba Mathis EP
"Return of the Outlaw"	2016	Struggle Jennings	Return Of The Outlaw EP
"Country"	2017	Angaleena Presley	Wrangled
"Gravity"	2017	Bone Thugs-n-Harmony	New Waves
"Your Little Man"	2017	Struggle Jennings	—N/a
"Litty Up(Album Mix)"	2017	DJ Paul	Underground Vol. 17 For Da Summa
"W.O.W. (With Out Warning)"	2018	PRhyme	PRhyme 2
"(The First Stone) Changes"	2018	The Fever 333	Made in America
"Southern Hospitality"	2018	Jelly Roll, Alexander King, Struggle Jennings	Goodnight Nashville
"Never Comin' Down"	2018	Cub da CookUpBoss	"Donald Trap" Make The Trap Great Again
"Wild Eyes"	2019	Struggle Jennings	The Widow's Son
"Remember"	2019	Caskey	Black Sheep 4
"The Easy Way"	2019	DJ Paul, Seed of 6ix	Power, Pleasure & Painful Things
"Wake Up Call"	2019	Rittz, Twista	Put a Crown on It
"I'm So Juiced Up"	2019	DJ Paul, Seed of 6ix, DJ Ease	—N/a
"Water Whippin Wizard"	2020	Riff Raff	Vanilla Gorilla
"Million Dollar Mullet"	2020	Riff Raff	—N/a
"McQueen Fiend" (Remix)	2020	Caskey	—N/a
"Winds of Change"	2020	Struggle Jennings, Jelly Roll, Tommy Vext	Waylon & Willie IV
"Crash Site"	2021	Struggle Jennings	Troubadour of Troubled Souls
"Fame"	2021	Dax	Pain Paints Pictures

== Music videos ==
Year	Title	Director	Artist(s)
As main performer
2007	"Kickin'"		—N/a
2008	"Box Chevy, Pt. 2"	Dave Wilson	—N/a
2010	"Pop the Trunk"	Motion Family	—N/a
2010	"I Wish (Remix)"	Supa Ill Vision	featuring Cyhi the Prynce and Pill
2011	"I Just Wanna Party"	Motion Family	featuring Gucci Mane
2011	"Daddy's Lambo"	Mike Mihail	—N/a
2011	"No Hands"	Erick Peyton	—N/a
2011	"Good to Go"		featuring Bun B
2011	"Hard White (Up in the Club)"	Motion Family	featuring Lil Jon
2011	"Let's Roll"	Motion Family	featuring Kid Rock
2012	"Marijuana"	Figz and Yelawolf	—N/a
2012	"Gutter"	Tyler Clinton and Yelawolf	featuring Rittz
2012	"Push 'Em"	Jason Goldwatch	with Travis Barker
2012	"Whistle Dixie"	Monsee	with Travis Barker
2012	"6 Feet Underground"	Tim Armstrong	with Travis Barker featuring Tim Armstrong
2013	"Funky Shit"	Devin Flynn	with Travis Barker
2013	"Way Out"	Potsy Ponciroli and Yelawolf	—N/a
2013	"F.A.S.T. Ride"	Hideout Pictures	—N/a
2013	"Hustle"	Potsy Ponciroli	featuring Paul Wall
2014	"Box Chevy V"	Potsy Ponciroli	—N/a
2014	"Till It's Gone"	Mike Mihail	—N/a
2015	"Down"		—N/a
2015	"Whiskey in a Bottle"	Mike Mihail	—N/a
2015	"American You"	Mike Mihail	with Travis Barker
2015	"Best Friend"	Spidy Smith	featuring Eminem
2015	"Johnny Cash"	Mike Mihail	—N/a
2015	"Devil in My Veins"	Spidy Smith	—N/a
2016	"Daylight"	Spidy Smith	—N/a
2016	"Shadows"	Spidy Smith	featuring Joshua Hedley
2017	"Row Your Boat"	Spidy Smith	—N/a
2017	"Punk"	Spidy Smith	featuring Travis Barker and Juicy J
2018	"Get Mine"	Spidy Smith	featuring Kid Rock
2019	"Unnatural Born Killer"	Spidy Smith	—N/a
2019	"Opie Taylor"	Spidy Smith	—N/a
2020	"You and Me"	Spidy Smith	—N/a
2020	"Rowdy"		featuring DJ Paul and MGK
2020	"Lightning"	Jorge Abarca	—N/a
2020	"Still Ridin'"	Mike Mihail	—N/a
2020	"Country Rich"	Jorge Abarca	featuring DJ Paul
2020	"Ghetto Cowboy"	Mike Mihail	—N/a
2021	"Been a Problem"	Legit Looks	with Caskey
2021	"Open"	Mason Wright	with Caskey featuring DJ Paul
2021	"Just The Intro"	Zev	with Caskey
2021	"Billy And The Purple Datsun"	Legit Looks	with Caskey
2021	"Cookies"	Zev	with Caskey featuring Cub da CookUpBoss
2021	"Million Dollar Deal"	Zev	with Caskey
2021	"Daytona"	Legit Looks	with Caskey
2021	"Light as a Feather"	Patrick Tohill	—N/a
2021	"Oh No"	Patrick Tohill	—N/a
2021	"Bounce"	Patrick Tohill	—N/a
2021	"Conoco"	Patrick Tohill	—N/a
2021	"Dope"	Patrick Tohill	—N/a
2021	"Rocks At Your Window"	Patrick Tohill	—N/a
2021	"Hillbilly Einstein"	Patrick Tohill	—N/a
2021	"Money"	Patrick Tohill	featuring Jelly Roll & Struggle Jennings
2021	"Losers Win Again"	Patrick Tohill	—N/a
2021	"Dog House"	Patrick Tohill	—N/a
2021	"Homeward Bound"	Patrick Tohill	—N/a
2021	"Aquanet"	Patrick Tohill	—N/a
2021	"Hot"	Patrick Tohill	—N/a
2021	"Mud Mouth"	Patrick Tohill	—N/a
2022	"Rock & Roll Baby"	Spidy Smith	—N/a
2022	"Make Me A Believer"	Spidy Smith	—N/a
2022	"Radio"	Spidy Smith	—N/a
2022	"Jump Out The Window"	Spidy Smith	—N/a
As featured performer
2009	"Mixin' Up the Medicine"	Rik Cordero	Juelz Santana featuring Yelawolf
2010	"You Ain't No DJ"	Parris	Big Boi featuring Yelawolf
2011	"Down This Road"	James Martin, Tom Vujcic	Bizarre featuring Yelawolf
2011	"Outlaw Shit"	Tyler Clinton	Struggle Jennings featuring Yelawolf and Waylon Jennings
2012	"Sleep At Night"	Payne Lindsey	Rittz featuring Yelawolf
2012	"Dollar General"		Stevie Stone featuring Yelawolf
2013	"Go Hard"	Charlie P	Da Mafia 6ix featuring Yelawolf
2016	"Get Away"	Edward Crowe, David Hulbert	DJ Paul featuring Yelawolf and Jon Connor
2017	"Your Little Man"	Edward Crowe, David Hulbert	Struggle Jennings featuring Yelawolf
2019	"The Easy Way"	Edward Crowe	DJ Paul featuring Seed of 6ix and Yelawolf
2020	"Million Dollar Mullet"	Alex Bittan	Riff Raff featuring Yelawolf
2021	"Crash Site"	Alisa Daglio	Struggle Jennings featuring Yelawolf
Cameo appearances
2007	"Hurt"		T.I. featuring Alfamega and Busta Rhymes
2009	"I'll Be in the Sky"		B.o.B
2012	"White Jesus"	Yelawolf	Rittz
2013	"Berzerk"	Syndrome	Eminem
2013	"Legacy"		Fefe Dobson
