= 2015 in hip-hop =

This article summarizes the events, album releases, and album release dates in hip-hop for the year 2015.

== Events ==
=== January ===
- On January 5, TMZ reported Chicago-based rap group Hotstylz, were suing Detroit-based rapper Eminem and Shady Records, for the amount of $8 million, for using a 25-second sample of their 2008 single "Lookin' Boy", on his 2013 hit single "Rap God", without crediting them or having their permission.
- On January 18, ASAP Mob's founder ASAP Yams, was found dead at the age of 26.
- On January 28, Lil Wayne filed a $51 million lawsuit against Birdman and Cash Money Records over the delay of Tha Carter V.
- On January 30, Suge Knight was arrested for murder after a fatal hit and run in Compton, California.

=== February ===
- On February 2, The Jacka died from gunshot wounds sustained in Oakland, California.
- On February 19, Charles Hamilton signed a record deal with Republic Records.
- On February 28, Lil Boosie was hospitalized for severe dehydration, resulting in cancellation of a show in Charlotte, North Carolina.

=== March ===
- On March 9, South African rapper Flabba was stabbed to death by his girlfriend in his home. He was 37.
- On March 10, Cannibal Ox released "The Blade of the Ronin," their first full-length album since "The Cold Vein"
- On March 26, Immortal Technique, along with his manager, were arrested in Santa Ana, California for suspicion of assault and robbery.
- On March 27, Lil Durk's manager, OTF Chino, was shot and killed in Chicago, Illinois.

=== April ===
- On April 11, Nelly was arrested on felony drug charges with possession of marijuana and drug paraphernalia in Putnam County, Tennessee.
- On April 18, Offset and Quavo of Migos were arrested on felony drug charges with possession of cocaine, oxycontin, and codeine as well as a felony charge of carrying a loaded gun onto school property during a concert at Georgia Southern University. It was then announced that Offset will be facing additional charges for reportedly fighting in jail.
- On April 21, Vic Mensa was signed to Roc Nation.
- On April 26, two of Lil Wayne's tour buses were shot at multiple times in Atlanta, Georgia.

=== May ===
- On May 10, Bow Wow announced he has left Cash Money Records.
- On May 17, Chinx and another passenger were shot in Queens while sitting in Chinx's Porsche. They were both rushed to a nearby hospital, where Chinx was pronounced dead.
- On May 24, Juicy J was hospitalized for exhaustion, resulting in cancellation of a show in San Francisco, California.
- On May 29, Chicago drill rapper Young Pappy was fatally shot in the back. This was the third attempt at Young Pappy's life, as the two prior shooting attempts left bystanders dead.

=== June ===
- On June 9, Brooklyn rapper Pumpkinhead died.
- On June 10, Rick Ross was arrested for marijuana possession, after his Bentley was pulled over in Atlanta, Georgia.
- On June 12, YG was shot three times in the hip in Los Angeles, California.
- On June 22, Puff Daddy was arrested for assaulting a football coach at University of California, Los Angeles.
- On June 24, Rick Ross was arrested for kidnapping, aggravated assault, and aggravated battery charges on a construction worker in Fayette County, Georgia. The same day that Nipsey Hussle was arrested in Los Angeles for possession of codeine.
- On June 25, Young Ready was killed in a shooting in Bogalusa, Louisiana.
- On June 26, DMX was arrested in New York stemming from a robbery complaint in Newark, New Jersey, and outstanding child support charges.
- On June 30, Kidd Kidd was arrested in New York upon arriving for a concert held at the Best Buy Theater. The same day that Scarface was hospitalized in Houston, Texas for an undisclosed reason.

=== July ===
- On July 2, Young Money Entertainment rapper Flow, was arrested in connection of murder on two men in New Orleans, Louisiana.
- On July 3, Young Dolph was arrested prior to a show in Montgomery, Alabama for parole violation.
- On July 10, Glo Gang affiliate Capo, was shot in Chicago, Illinois. He was rushed to the Advocate Christ Medical Center where he was pronounced dead. The same day that Hussein Fatal of The Outlawz was killed in a car accident.
- On July 13, 50 Cent filed for Chapter 11 bankruptcy protection, subsequently following a $5 million lawsuit in which he was ordered to pay Lastonia Leviston, Rick Ross' baby mother, after leaking a sex tape in which she was featured.
- On July 15, Young Thug was arrested in Sandy Springs, Georgia on charges of terroristic threats stemming from an incident at the Perimeter Mall on July 7. The same day DMX was sentenced to six months of jail following his arrest on June 26. and Birdman and Young Thug were alleged by prosecutors of conspiring to murder Lil Wayne and being involved in the April 26th shooting of Lil Wayne's tour bus.
- On July 16, Rico Richie was arrested for selling weed and being in possession of firearms. The same day that Young Thug was charged with drugs and weapons charges after police raided his home in Sandy Springs, GA where they seized cocaine, marijuana and automatic weapons. and Birdman filed a $50 million lawsuit against Jay Z's Tidal streaming service, over Lil Wayne's Free Weezy Album. The lawsuit claims that Cash Money Records exclusively owns the rights to Lil Wayne's music.

=== August ===
- On August 1, Action Bronson cancelled his Osheaga Festival performance in Montreal following the circulation of a petition against his misogynistic and violent lyrics. He was subsequently replaced by Mos Def.
- On August 5, Busta Rhymes was arrested and charged with assault stemming from an altercation with an employee at a New York City gym.
- On August 8, Nicholas "Nick Scarfo" Jackson, a rapper from Memphis, Tennessee and a founder of Prophet Entertainment, died at the age of 42. The same day that Sean Price, one half of the duo Heltah Skeltah died at age 43.
- On August 10, Tyler, the Creator cancelled the Australian leg of his Cherry Bomb World Tour, following a campaign against the portrayal of women in his music.
- On August 17, Birdman was sued for $200,000 by producer DVLP for unpaid production work with Lil Wayne and other Cash Money Records artists.
- On August 20, Birdman was sued for $350,000 by Javier Nuno, a former Cash Money Records employee, for unpaid wages of 2 1/2 years between September 2012 to February 2015.
- On August 21, Rick Ross was sued for $55,000 by Conexts for failure to promote a Super Bowl party that was scheduled to take place on January 30 in Scottsdale, Arizona.
- On August 23, Wiz Khalifa was arrested at LAX in Los Angeles, California for riding a personal hoverboard within the airport.
- On August 26, The Game was sued by rapper/designer Ariza Obey for the unlawful use of his photo for his Ryda single artwork. The same day that Tyga was ordered to pay $77,000 in back rent to a former landlord of his Calabasas, California home after failure to appear in court. and Tyler, the Creator announced via Twitter that he has been banned from touring the United Kingdom for 3–5 years due to his lyrical content.
- On August 27, Kanye West was awarded $440,000 stemming from a lawsuit after a video of his proposal to Kim Kardashian leaked online without consent.

=== September ===
- On September 1, Chris Brown was sued after a man sustained injuries stemming from a shooting in a San Jose, California nightclub in January 2015. The same day that Kevin Gates was charged with simple battery after an incident with a fan at a concert held on August 30, 2015, in Lakeland, Florida.
- On September 3, Chief Keef was sued for $175,000 after skipping out of a scheduled performance at Auburn University.
- On September 26, Fetty Wap was reportedly involved in a motorcycle accident in his hometown of Paterson, New Jersey.

=== October ===
- On October 4, Action Bronson left a performance in Norway half-way through his set for medical reasons.
- On October 6, Curren$y was awarded $3 million in settlement stemming from a 2012 lawsuit against Damon Dash for releasing two albums without his consent. The same that Missy Elliott was sued for $75,000 for failure to return deposits after the cancellation of two shows in Brazil.
- On October 7, 50 Cent sued Garvey Schubert Barer for poor representation stemming from the lawsuit by 'Sleek Audio', in which 50 Cent was ordered to pay $16 million.
- On October 9, Scarface was arrested following the taping of the 2015 BET Hip Hop Awards in Atlanta, Georgia stemming from a warrant. The same day, Three 6 Mafia member Koopsta Knicca died of a brain aneurysm at the age of 40.
- On October 11, Wiz Khalifa was cited for public urination in his hometown of Pittsburgh, Pennsylvania.
- On October 13, Flava Flav pleaded guilty to one count of unlicensed aggravated operation of a motor vehicle stemming from a traffic stop violation in January 2014.
- On October 16, Ma$e was served with a tax lien of $41,525.14 to the state of Georgia, his second of 2015.
- On October 29, Birdman & Mack Maine were sued over the cover art for the latter's song "Ethan Couch".

=== November ===
- On November 3, Riff Raff was sued by a former landlord for unpaid rent and property damages.
- On November 5, Master P was ordered to pay monthly child ($10,473) and spousal ($16,574) support payments, as well as $200,000 in attorney fees stemming from his divorce settlement case.
- On November 10, Lil Wayne was ordered to pay $96,000 to a Pyrotechnics company regarding a non-paid settlement stemming from a purchase made prior to his 2013 tour.
- On November 11, Prodigy sued Universal Music for the sum of $57,489 for unlawful distribution of music as well as attorney fees.
- On November 20, Peewee Roscoe, Bankroll Mafia member and former Rich Gang affiliate, was sentenced to 20 years in prison for shooting up Lil Wayne's tour bus.
- On November 26, Lil Wayne's Trukfit clothing line was sued by model Shanise Taylor for unlawful use of image.

=== December ===
- On December 23, Chicago rapper King L was shot in the head and survived.

== Released albums ==
Release date	Artist(s)	Album	Record label(s)	Notes
January 6	Rae Sremmurd	SremmLife	EarDrummers Entertainment, Interscope Records	Debuted at No. 5 on the Billboard 200; Singles: "No Flex Zone", "No Type", "Throw Sum Mo", "This Could Be Us", "Come Get Her"
January 9	B-Tight	Retro	Raid Records	Debuted at No. 8 on the German Charts
January 13	DMX	Redemption of the Beast	Seven Arts Music	
January 13	Marc 7 (of Jurassic 5)	Food, Clothing and Shelter	Macari And Me	
January 15	Future and Zaytoven	Beast Mode	Freebandz	
January 20	Joey Badass	B4.Da.$$	Cinematic Music Group, Pro Era, Relentless Records, RED Distribution	Debuted at No. 5 on the Billboard 200
January 20	Lil Wayne	Sorry 4 the Wait 2	Young Money	
January 20	Lupe Fiasco	Tetsuo & Youth	Atlantic Records, 1st & 15th Entertainment	Debuted at No. 14 on the Billboard 200; Singles: "Deliver"
January 20	Sadat X	Never Left	Loyalty Digital Corp	
January 25	Gawne	Gawne Lane	GAWNE LLC	
January 26	Mike G	Award Tour II	Odd Future Records	
January 26	Alonzo	Règlement de comptes	Def Jam Recordings France	Debuted at No. 2 on the French Charts
January 27	Doomtree	All Hands	Doomtree Records	
January 27	Jarren Benton	Slow Motion	Funk Volume, Warner Bros. Records	
January 27	Kenn Starr	Square One	Mello Music Group	
January 27	Twiztid	The Darkness	Majik Ninja Entertainment	
January 27	Derek Minor	Empire	Reflection Music Group, eOne	
February 3	Kid Ink	Full Speed	Tha Alumni Music Group, 88 Classic, RCA Records	Debuted at No. 14 on the Billboard 200; Singles: "Body Language", "Hotel" "Be Real"
February 3	Open Mike Eagle	A Special Episode Of	Mello Music Group	
February 3	Slim Thug	Hogg Life: The Beginning	Hogg Life, Empire Distribution	
February 6	Fler	Keiner kommt klar mit mir	Maskulin	Debuted at No. 1 on the German Charts
February 10	Sisqó	Last Dragon	Massenburg Media	
February 10	Nature	Seasons Changed	DCM, Seven13	
February 13	Drake	If You're Reading This It's Too Late	Young Money Entertainment, Cash Money Records	Debuted at No. 1 on the Billboard 200; Singles: "Energy"; Certified Platinum
February 13	Bushido	Carlo Cokxxx Nutten 3	ersguterjunge, Sony Music	Debuted at No. 1 on the German Charts
February 17	Grand Daddy I.U.	P.I.M.P. (Paper Is My Priority)	Steady Flow Enterprises	
February 23	Gradur	L'homme au bob	Barclay Records	Debuted at No. 1 on the French Charts
February 23	O.S.T.R.	Podróż zwana życiem	Asfalt Records	Debuted at No. 1 on the Polish Charts; Certified Platinum in Poland
February 24	Big Sean	Dark Sky Paradise	GOOD Music, Def Jam Recordings	Debuted at No. 1 on the Billboard 200; Singles: "I Don't Fuck with You", "Paradise", "Blessings", "One Man Can Change the World", "Play No Games"
February 24	Fashawn	The Ecology	Mass Appeal Records	Singles: "Golden State of Mind", "Guess Who's Back"
February 24	Ghostface Killah & BADBADNOTGOOD	Sour Soul	Lex Records	
February 24	Malik B. & Mr. Green	Unpredictable	Enemy Soil	
February 24	Chris Brown & Tyga	Fan of a Fan: The Album	RCA Records, Young Money Entertainment, Republic Records, Cash Money Records	Debuted at No. 7 on the Billboard 200; Singles: "Ayo", "Bitches N Marijuana"
February 24	Z-Ro	Melting the Crown	Rap-A-Lot Records	
February 24	Demrick & Cali Cleve	Losing Focus	Battle Axe Records	
February 25	Johnny Polygon	Water Damage	Self-released	Singles: "Limosexsuperstar"
February 28	Hussein Fatal	Ridin' All Week On 'Em	Thugtertainment	
March 3	Brodinski	Brava	Parlophone, Warner Music, Bromance	
March 3	Cannibal Ox	Blade of the Ronin	IGC Records, iHipHop Distribution	
March 3	G-Unit	The Beast Is G-Unit	G-Unit Records	Debuted at No. 27 on the Billboard 200
March 9	Freddie Gibbs	Pronto	E$GN	
March 9	DJ Yoda	Breakfast of Champions	Get Involved	
March 10	Heems	Eat Pray Thug	Megaforce Records	
March 10	Lord Finesse	The SP1200 Project: A Re-Awakening	Slice-Of-Spice	
March 10	Marc 7 (of Jurassic 5)	When Sounds Attack Vol. 1	Macari And Me	
March 14	SHOP BOYZ	Gift and a Curse	Still Shop Entertainment	
March 15	Kendrick Lamar	To Pimp a Butterfly	Top Dawg Entertainment, Aftermath Entertainment, Interscope Records	Debuted at No. 1 on the Billboard 200; Singles: "i", "The Blacker the Berry", "King Kunta", "Alright"; Certified Platinum
March 17	Big Shug	Triple OGzus	Brick Records	
March 17	Bossolo & Spice 1	Thug Therapy	Thug World Music Group	
March 17	Da Mafia 6ix	Watch What U Wish...	S.A.T.ent. Music	
March 17	Lil' Flip	El Jefe	Clover G Records	
March 17	Substantial & The Other Guys	The Past – EP	HiPNOTT Records	
March 17	Father	Who's Gonna Get Fucked First?	Awful Records	
March 23	Action Bronson	Mr. Wonderful	Atlantic Records, Vice Records	Debuted at No. 7 on the Billboard 200; Singles: "Easy Rider", "Actin Crazy", "Terry", "Baby Blue"
March 23	Earl Sweatshirt	I Don't Like Shit, I Don't Go Outside: An Album by Earl Sweatshirt	Tan Cressida, Columbia Records	Debuted at No. 12 on the Billboard 200; Singles: "Grief"
March 24	JR & PH7 x Chuuwee	The South Sac Mack	Below System Records	
March 24	Rapper Big Pooh	Words Paint Pictures	Mello Music Group	
March 27	Farid Bang	Asphalt Massaka 3	Banger Musik	Debuted at No. 1 on the German Charts
March 30	Kaaris	Le Bruit de mon âme	Therapy Music	Debuted at No. 4 on the French Charts
March 30	Lartiste	Fenomeno	Six-O-Nine	Debuted at No. 14 on the French Charts
March 31	DJ Hoppa	Hoppa and Friends	Funk Volume, Broken Complex	
March 31	J-Live	His Own Self	Mortier Music	
March 31	Ludacris	Ludaversal	Disturbing tha Peace, Def Jam Recordings	Debuted at No. 3 on the Billboard 200; Singles: "Good Lovin"
March 31	Wale	The Album About Nothing	Maybach Music Group, Atlantic Records	Debuted at No. 1 on the Billboard 200; Singles: "The Body", "The Matrimony"
March 31	Willie the Kid & The Alchemist	Masterpiece Theatre	Chemistry Set	
April 1	Olamide & Phyno	2 Kings	Penthauze Music, YBNL Nation	Singles: "Une", "Confam Ni"
April 4	Currensy	Pilot Talk III	Jet Life Recordings	
April 6	Young Fathers	White Men Are Black Men Too	Big Dada	
April 7	Aceyalone & Bionik	Action	Bionik Music	
April 7	Cashis	The County Hound 3	Bogish Brand Entertainment	
April 7	Ceschi	Broken Bone Ballads	Fake Four Inc.	
April 7	Flo Rida	My House	Poe Boy Entertainment, Atlantic Records	Debuted at No. 14 on the Billboard 200; Singles: "GDFR", "I Don't Like It, I Love It" "My House"
April 7	La Chat	Murder She Spoke II	Phixieous Entertainment	
April 7	Red Pill	Look What This World Did to Us	Mello Music Group	
April 11	Bones	Powder	TeamSESH	
April 13	Booba	D.U.C.	Tallac Records	Debuted at No. 1 on the French Charts
April 13	Sadek	Johnny Niuum ne meurt jamais	Industreet Music	Debuted at No. 18 on the French Charts
April 13	Sinik	Immortel II	Six-O-Nine	Debuted at No. 5 on the French Charts
April 13	Tyler, the Creator	Cherry Bomb	Odd Future Records, Sony	Debuted at No. 4 on the Billboard 200
April 14	B-Legit	What We Been Doin	Block Movement, Empire Distribution	
April 14	M-1 & Bonnot	All Power to the People (Ap2p)	Sound Weapon Global Media	
April 14	Project Pat	Mista Don't Play 2: Everythangs Money	E1 Music	
April 17	Young Thug	Barter 6	Atlantic Records, 300 Entertainment	Debuted at No. 22 on the Billboard 200; Singles: "Check"
April 20	Currensy	Even More Saturday Night Car Tunes	Atlantic Records, Jet Life Recordings	Debuted at No. 58 on the Billboard 200
April 21	Black Rob	Genuine Article	Slimstyle Records	
April 21	L'Orange & Jeremiah Jae	The Night Took Us In like Family	Mello Music Group	
April 21	Yelawolf	Love Story	Shady Records, Interscope Records	Debuted at No. 3 on the Billboard 200; Singles: "Box Chevy V", "Till It's Gone", Whiskey In a Bottle", "American You", "Best Friend"
April 28	Alex Faith & Dre Murray	Southern Lights: Overexposed	Collision Records	
April 28	Blueprint	King No Crown	Weightless Recordings	
April 28	Code Kunst	Crumple	Self-released	Debuted at number 34 on the Gaon Album Chart in 2017; Singles: "Edison", "Golden Cow"
April 28	Insane Clown Posse	The Marvelous Missing Link: Lost	Psychopathic Records	Debuted at No. 17 on the Billboard 200
April 28	The Knux	Eleven	Rebel House	
April 28	Philadelphia Slick	Earth Rocks Harder	Badtape Music	
April 28	Raekwon	Fly International Luxurious Art	Ice H2O Records, Caroline Records	Debuted at No. 60 on the Billboard 200; Singles: "All About You", Soundboy Kill It", "Wall to Wall"
May 1	Xatar	Baba Aller Babas	Alles Oder Nix Records	Debuted at No. 1 on the German Charts
May 4	eMC	The Tonite Show	Penalty Entertainment	
May 4	JME	Integrity>	Boy Better Know	
May 4	Mac Tyer	Je suis une légende	Monstre Marin Corporation	Debuted at No. 6 on the French Charts
May 4	Tech N9ne	Special Effects	Strange Music	Debuted at No. 4 on the Billboard 200; Singles: "Hood Go Crazy"
May 4	Virus Syndicate & Dope D.O.D.	Battle Royal	Midication Records	
May 5	Gemstones	Blind Elephant	Malaco Records, Xist Music	
May 5	Knxwledge	Hud Dreams	Stones Throw Records	
May 5	Nappy Roots	The 40 Akerz Project	Nappy Roots Entertainment Group	
May 5	Oddisee	The Good Fight	Mello Music Group	
May 12	Canibus & Bronze Nazareth	Time Flys, Life Dies... Phoenix Rises	RBC Records	
May 12	Snoop Dogg	Bush	Doggystyle Records, i Am Other, Columbia Records	Debuted at No. 14 on the Billboard 200; Singles: "Peaches N Cream", "So Many Pros", California Roll"
May 12	EDIDON of The Outlawz & Nutt-So of StreeThugs	Ghetto Starz: Streets to the Stage	O4L Digital	
May 15	Bass Sultan Hengzt	Musik wegen Weibaz	No Limits	
May 18	Camp Lo	Ragtime Hightimes	Nature Sounds	
May 18	Murs	Have a Nice Life	Strange Music	Debuted at No. 94 on the Billboard 200
May 18	Youssoupha	NGRTD	Bomayé Musik	Debuted at No. 4 on the French Charts
May 19	Georgia Anne Muldrow	A Thoughtiverse Unmarred	Mello Music Group	
May 19	Twista & Do or Die	Withdrawal	GMG Entertainment	
May 25	Médine	Démineur	Din Records	Debuted at No. 54 on the French Charts
May 26	A$AP Rocky	At. Long. Last. A$AP	A$AP Worldwide, RCA Records	Debuted at No. 1 on the Billboard 200; Singles: "Lord Pretty Flacko Jodye 2 (LPFJ2)", "Everyday", "LSD"
May 26	Boosie Badazz	Touch Down 2 Cause Hell	Trill Entertainment, Bad Azz, Atlantic Records	Debuted at No. 3 on the Billboard 200; Singles: "On That Level", "Like a Man", "Retaliation"
May 26	Dizzy Wright	The Growing Process	Funk Volume	Debuted at No. 47 on the Billboard 200
May 26	Frank Nitt	Frankie Rothstein	Fat Beats Records	
May 28	Donnie Trumpet & The Social Experiment	Surf	Donnie Trumpet & The Social Experiment	
May 29	Ferris MC	Glück ohne Scherben	Warner Music Group	
June 1	Disiz	Rap Machine	Lucidream	Debuted at No. 12 on the French Charts
June 1	Lacrim	R.I.P.R.O. Volume 1	Pop Korn Music Group	Debuted at No. 1 on the French Charts
June 2	Dom Kennedy	By Dom Kennedy	The Other Peoples Money Company	Debuted at No. 23 on the Billboard 200
June 2	Jedi Mind Tricks	The Thief and the Fallen	Enemy Soil	Debuted at No. 105 on the Billboard 200
June 2	Lil Durk	Remember My Name	Def Jam Recordings	Debuted at No. 14 on the Billboard 200
June 4	Killah Priest	Planet of the Gods	Proverbs Records	
June 5	Troy Ave	Major Without a Deal	BSB Records, EMPIRE Recordings	Debuted at No. 109 on the Billboard 200
June 8	Death Grips	The Powers That B	Harvest Records	
June 8	Black M	Les yeux plus gros que l'Olympia	Wati B	Debuted at No. 24 on the French Charts
June 8	Jul	Je tourne en rond	Liga One Industry	Debuted at No. 2 on the French Charts
June 8	Nekfeu	Feu	Seine Zoo	Debuted at No. 3 on the French Charts
June 9	Demrick & DJ Hoppa	Stoney Point	Broken Complex	
June 9	Large Professor	Re: Living	Fat Beats Records	
June 9	Supastition	Gold Standard	Reform School Music	
June 16	Czarface	Every Hero Needs a Villain	Brick Records	Singles: "Deadly Class"
June 16	Mr. Cheeks	Raised	Wundertwinz Records	
June 16	Slum Village	Yes!	Ne'astra Music	
June 18	Tede & Sir Michu	Vanillahajs	Wielkie Joł	Debuted at No. 1 on the Polish Charts; Certified Gold in Poland
June 23	Pete Rock	PeteStrumentals 2	Mello Music Group	
June 23	Skyzoo	Music for My Friends	First Generation Rich, Empire Distribution	
June 23	King Los	God, Money, War	RCA Records	Debuted at No. 68 on the Billboard 200; Singles: "War", "Can't Fade Us", "Glory to the Lord"
June 23	Tyga	The Gold Album: 18th Dynasty	Last Kings Entertainment	Singles: "Hollywood Niggaz", "Pleazer"
June 29	The Internet	Ego Death	Odd Future Records	
June 29	Meek Mill	Dreams Worth More Than Money	Maybach Music Group, Atlantic Records, Dream Chaser Records	Debuted at No. 1 on the Billboard 200; Singles: "All Eyes on You"
June 30	Apathy	Weekend at the Cape	Dirty Version	
June 30	Locksmith	Lofty Goals	Landmark Entertainment	
June 30	Main Attrakionz	808s & Dark Grapes III	Vapor Records	
June 30	Stevie Stone	Malta Bend	Strange Music	
June 30	Vince Staples	Summertime '06	ARTium Recordings, Def Jam Recordings	Debuted at No. 39 on the Billboard 200; Singles: "Senorita", "Get Paid"
July 4	Lil Wayne	Free Weezy Album	Young Money Entertainment	Singles: "Glory"
July 6	Krept and Konan	The Long Way Home	Play Dirty, Virgin EMI Records, Def Jam Recordings	Singles: "Certified", "Freak of the Week ", "F.W.T.S / Active"
July 7	Statik Selektah	Lucky 7	Duck Down Music Inc., Showoff Records	
July 10	Ghostface Killah	Twelve Reasons to Die II	Linear Labs	
July 10	Kutt Calhoun	Kuttin' Loose	Black Gold Entertainment	
July 10	NBS & Snowgoons	Trapped in America	Big Bang Records, Goon MuSick	
July 10	Quelle Chris & Chris Keys	Innocent Country	Mello Music Group	
July 10	Slim Thug	Hogg Life Vol. 2: Still Surviving	Hogg Life, Empire Distribution	
July 16	Public Enemy	Man Plans God Laughs	Spitdigital	
July 17	Chris Webby	Jamo Neat	Homegrown Records	
July 17	Future	DS2	A-1 Recordings, Freebandz, Epic Records	Debuted at No. 1 on the Billboard 200; Singles: "Fuck Up Some Commas", "Blow a Bag", "Where Ya At"
July 17	Joell Ortiz & Illmind	Human	Roseville Music Group, Yaowa! Nation	
July 17	Papoose	You Can't Stop Destiny	Honorable Records	
July 17	Pitbull	Dale	Mr. 305 Records	Debuted at No. 97 on the Billboard 200
July 17	Your Old Droog	The Nicest	Droog Recordings, Empire Distribution	
July 22	Injury Reserve	Live from the Dentist Office	Las Fuegas	
July 24	Capone-N-Noreaga	Lessons	Thugged Out Militainment, Penalty Entertainment	Singles: "3 on 3", "Elevate", "Shooters Worldwide"
July 24	Hopsin	Pound Syndrome	Funk Volume, Warner Bros. Records	Debuted at No. 18 on the Billboard 200
July 24	L'Orange & Kool Keith	Time? Astonishing!	Mello Music Group	
July 24	Madchild	Silver Tongue Devil	Battle Axe Records	
July 24	Trae tha Truth	Tha Truth	ABN, Hustle Gang, Empire Distribution	Debuted at No. 165 on the Billboard 200; Singles: "I Don't Give a Fuck", "Tricken Every Car I Get"
July 24	Various Artists	Southpaw (Music from and Inspired by the Motion Picture)	Shady Records, Interscope Records	Debuted at No. 5 on the Billboard 200; Singles: "Phenomenal", "Kings Never Die", "R.N.S."
July 31	Gunplay	Living Legend	Maybach Music Group, Def Jam Recordings	Debuted at No. 171 on the Billboard 200; Singles: "Tell 'Em Daddy", "Wuzhanindoe"
July 31	Insane Clown Posse	The Marvelous Missing Link: Found	Psychopathic Records	
July 31	Lil Debbie	Homegrown	Lil Debbie Records	
July 31	Lil Dicky	Professional Rapper	David Burd Music	
July 31	Migos	Yung Rich Nation	300 Entertainment, Quality Control, Atlantic Records	Debuted at No. 17 on the Billboard 200; Singles: "One Time"
August 2	Chief Keef	Bang 3	FilmOn Music, Glo Gang, RBC Records	Debuted at No. 131 on the Billboard 200
August 6	Warren G	Regulate... G Funk Era, Pt. II	G-Funk Entertainment	
August 7	Dr. Dre	Compton	Aftermath Entertainment, Interscope Records	Debuted at No. 2 on the Billboard 200; Singles: "Talking to My Diary", "Talk About It"
August 7	Gangrene	You Disgust Me	Mass Appeal Records	
August 7	Obie Trice	The Hangover	Black Market Entertainment	
August 14	B.o.B	Psycadelik Thoughtz	Grand Hustle Records, Atlantic Records	Debuted at No. 97 on the Billboard 200; Singles: "Back and Forth"
August 14	Chinx	Welcome to JFK	Riot Squad, NuSense Music Group, Coke Boys, eOne Music	Debuted at No. 21 on the Billboard 200; Singles: "On Your Body"
August 14	Scoop DeVille & Demrick	Loud Pack: Extracts	Stalk Market Records	
August 16	Styles P	A Wise Guy and a Wise Guy	The Phantom Entertainment	
August 21	Method Man	The Meth Lab	Hanz On Music, Tommy Boy Entertainment	
August 21	Mick Jenkins	Wave[s]	Free Nation, Cinematic Music Group	
August 21	Sean Price	Songs in the Key of Price	Ruck Down Records	
August 28	Kottonmouth Kings	Krown Power	United Family Music	
September 4	Add-2	Prey For the Poor	Jamla Records	
September 4	Jus Allah	M.M.A. (Meanest Man Alive)	Jus Allah	
September 4	K Camp	Only Way Is Up	Interscope Records	Debuted at No. 20 on the Billboard 200; Singles: "Lil Bit", "Comfortable"
September 4	k-os	Can't Fly Without Gravity	Dine Alone Records	
September 4	Scarface	Deeply Rooted	Let's Talk	Debuted at No. 11 on the Billboard 200
September 4	Sido	VI	Vertigo Records, Capitol Records	
September 4	Travis Scott	Rodeo	Grand Hustle Records, Epic Records	Debuted at No. 3 on the Billboard 200; Singles: "3500", "Antidote", "Piss on Your Grave"
September 5	Glasses Malone	GlassHouse 2: Life Ain't Nuthin But...	Division Media Company	
September 11	Fler	Weil die Straße nicht vergisst	Maskulin	
September 11	Jay Rock	90059	Top Dawg Entertainment	Debuted at No. 16 on the Billboard 200; Singles: "Money Trees Deuce", "Gumbo", "90059"
September 11	Paris	Pistol Politics	Guerrilla Funk Recordings, Filmworks, LLC	
September 11	Sir Michael Rocks	Populair	6 Cell Phones	
September 11	TIP	Da' Nic	King Inc., Empire Distribution	Debuted at No. 22 on the Billboard 200; Singles: "Project Steps", "Check, Run It"
September 11	Verbal Kent	Anesthesia	Mello Music Group	
September 14	Angel Haze	Back to the Woods	Self-released	
September 17	K-Rino	Makin’ Enemies	Black Book Int., SoSouth	
September 18	Andy Mineo	Uncomfortable	Reach Records	Debuted at No. 10 on the Billboard 200
September 18	Blackalicious	Imani Vol. 1	OGM Recordings	
September 18	Chief Keef	Bang 3, Pt. II	FilmOn Music	Debuted at No. 104 on the Billboard 200
September 18	Little Simz	A Curious Tale of Trials + Persons	Age 101 Music	
September 18	Mac Miller	GO:OD AM	Warner Bros. Records, REMember Music	Debuted at No. 4 on the Billboard 200; Singles: "100 Grandkids", "Break the Law", "Clubhouse"
September 18	¡Mayday!	Future Vintage	Strange Music	
September 18	Wordsworth & Donel Smokes	New Beginning	Worldwide Communications	
September 18	Young Dro	Da Reality Show	Entertainment One, Grand Hustle	Singles: "We in da City", "Ugh"
September 20	Drake & Future	What a Time to Be Alive	Cash Money Records, Epic Records	Debuted at No. 1 on the Billboard 200
September 25	Apollo Brown	Grandeur	Mello Music Group	
September 25	Big Grams (Big Boi & Phantogram)	Big Grams	Epic Records	Debuted at No. 39 on the Billboard 200
September 25	Casey Veggies	Live & Grow	Epic Records, Vested in Culture	Singles: "Backflip", "Tied Up"
September 25	Erick Sermon	E.S.P. (Erick Sermon's Perception)	Def Squad Records	
September 25	Fetty Wap	Fetty Wap	300 Entertainment, RGF Productions	Debuted at No. 1 on the Billboard 200; Singles: "Trap Queen", "679", "My Way", "Again"
September 25	Milo	So the Flies Don't Come	Ruby Yacht, The Order Label	
September 25	Paul Wall	Slab God	Paul Wall Music, Empire Distribution	
September 25	The Underachievers	Evermore: The Art of Duality	Brainfeeder, RPM MSC Distribution	
October 2	Chuck Inglish	Everybody's Big Brother	Sounds Like Fun Records	
October 2	Johnny Polygon	I Love You, Goodnight.	Self-released	Singles: "The Fall", "Dead Meat"
October 9	Denmark Vessey	Martin Lucid Dream	Rappers I Know	
October 9	The Game	The Documentary 2	Blood Money Entertainment, eOne Music	Debuted at No. 2 on the Billboard 200; Singles: "100", "Don't Trip"
October 9	Prozak	Black Ink	Strange Music	
October 9	R. City	What Dreams Are Made Of	Kemosabe Records, RCA Records	Debuted at No. 25 on the Billboard 200; Singles: "Locked Away"
October 16	The Game	The Documentary 2.5	Blood Money Entertainment, eOne Music	Debuted at No. 6 on the Billboard 200; Singles: "El Chapo"
October 16	Joe Budden	All Love Lost	eOne Music	Debuted at No. 29 on the Billboard 200; Singles: "Broke", "Slaughtermouse"
October 16	MGK	General Admission	Bad Boy Records, Interscope Records	Debuted at No. 4 on the Billboard 200; Singles: "Till I Die", "A Little More", "World Series", "Gone"
October 16	Raury	All We Need	Columbia Records	
October 16	Semi Hendrix (Ras Kass & Jack Splash)	Breakfast at Banksy's	Mello Music Group	
October 23	DJ Khaled	I Changed a Lot	We the Best, RED, Sony Music	Debuted at No. 12 on the Billboard 200; Singles: "They Don't Love You No More", "Hold You Down", "How Many Times", "Gold Slugs", "You Mine"
October 30	Roots Manuva	Bleeds	Big Dada	
October 30	Boosie Badazz	Thrilla, Vol. 1	Lil Boosie Music	
October 30	Ces Cru	Recession Proof	Strange Music	
October 30	DJ Paul	Master of Evil	Psychopathic Records	
October 30	J Dilla	Dillatronic	Vintage Vibez Music Group	
October 30	Kirk Knight	Late Knight Special	Pro Era, Cinematic Music Group	
October 30	M.E.D., Blu & Madlib	Bad Neighbor	BangYaHead	
October 30	Ray West & Kool Keith	A Couple of Slices	Red Apples 45	
October 30	Slim Thug	Hogg Life Vol. 3: Hustler of the Year	Hogg Life	
October 31	Cassper Nyovest	Refiloe	Family Tree, Kalawa Jazmee Records, Universal Music South Africa	Singles: "Mama I Made It (#MIMI)", "Bheki'ndaba Zakho", "No Worries"
October 31	Young Thug	Slime Season 2	Self-released	
November 4	Puff Daddy & The Family	MMM (Money Making Mitch)	Bad Boy Records, Epic Records	
November 6	Talib Kweli & 9th Wonder	Indie 500	Jamla Records, Javotti Media	
November 8	GoldLink	And After That, We Didn't Talk	Soulection	
November 10	Berner & Cam'ron	Contraband	Bern One Entertainment	
November 13	Kerser	Next Step	ABK	Debuted at No. 5 on the Australian Charts
November 13	Logic	The Incredible True Story	Def Jam Recordings, Visionary Music Group	Debuted at No. 3 on the Billboard 200; Singles: "Young Jesus", "Like Woah", "Fade Away"
November 13	MoSS	Marching to the Sound of My Own Drum	MoSS Appeal Music	
November 13	Rapper Big Pooh & Nottz	Home Sweet Home	Mello Music Group	
November 13	Redman	Mudface	Gilla House Records	Debuted at No. 147 on the Billboard 200
November 13	Skeme	Ingleworld 3	MADE Headlines	
November 13	Ty Dolla Sign	Free TC	Taylor Gang Records, Pu$haz Ink, Atlantic Records	Debuted at No. 14 on the Billboard 200; Singles: "Only Right", "Blasé", "When I See Ya", "Saved", "Solid"
November 13	Jeezy	Church in These Streets	CTE World, Def Jam Recordings	Debuted at No. 4 on the Billboard 200; Singles: "God", "Church in These Streets", "Gold Bottles", "Sweet Life"
November 20	E-40	Poverty and Prosperity	Heavy On The Grind Entertainment	
November 20	Freddie Gibbs	Shadow of a Doubt	ESGN, Empire Distribution	Debuted at No. 76 on the Billboard 200
November 20	Jadakiss	Top 5 Dead or Alive	D-Block Records, Def Jam Recordings	Debuted at No. 4 on the Billboard 200; Singles: "Jason", "Ain't Nothin New"
November 20	Krayzie Bone	Chasing the Devil	Krayzie Bone Media LLC, RBC Records	
November 20	Tech N9ne	Strangeulation Vol. II	Strange Music	Debuted at No. 25 on the Billboard 200
December 4	Currensy	Canal Street Confidential	Jet Life Recordings, Atlantic Records	Singles: "Bottom of the Bottle"
December 4	G-Eazy	When It's Dark Out	RCA Records	Debuted at No. 5 on the Billboard 200
December 4	Pimp C	Long Live the Pimp	Mass Appeal Records	Debuted at No. 96 on the Billboard 200
December 4	Rick Ross	Black Market	Maybach Music Group, Def Jam Recordings, Slip-n-Slide Records	Debuted at No. 6 on the Billboard 200; Singles: "Foreclosures", "Sorry"
December 4	Kid Cudi	Speedin' Bullet 2 Heaven	Republic Records, Wicked Awesome Records	Singles: "Confused!", "Speedin' Bullet 2 Heaven"
December 4	Sheek Louch	Silverback Gorilla 2	Tommy Boy Entertainment	Singles: "Bang Bang"
December 4	Twista	Livin Legend	GMG Entertainment	
December 4	NxWorries (Knxwledge and Anderson Paak)	Link Up & Suede	Stones Throw Records	Singles: "Suede", "Link Up"
December 4	EDIDON of Outlawz	The Hope Dealer, Pt. 1	O4l Digital	
December 11	August Alsina	This Thing Called Life	Def Jam Recordings	
December 11	Lizzo	Big Grrrl Small World	BGSW	
December 11	PRhyme (Royce da 5'9" and DJ Premier)	PRhyme (Deluxe Edition)	PRhyme Records	
December 11	Charles Hamilton	The Black Box	Republic Records	
December 11	Kollegah	Zuhältertape Volume 4	Selfmade Records	Debuted at No. 1 on the German album charts with first week sales of 115,000 copies in Germany; Singles: "Genozid"; Certified Gold in Germany
December 18	Chris Brown	Royalty	RCA Records	Singles: "Liquor", "Zero", "Back to Sleep", "Fine By Me"
December 18	Pusha T	King Push – Darkest Before Dawn: The Prelude	Def Jam Recordings, GOOD Music	Singles: "Untouchable"
December 25	Kid Ink	Summer in the Winter	RCA Records	Singles: "Promise"

== Highest-charting singles ==
Hip hop singles which charted in the Top 40 of the Billboard Hot 100
Song	Artist	Peak position
"See You Again"	Wiz Khalifa featuring Charlie Puth	1
"Trap Queen"	Fetty Wap	2
"Hotline Bling"	Drake	2
"Watch Me (Whip/Nae Nae)"	Silentó	3
"679"	Fetty Wap featuring Remy Boyz	4
"My Way"	Fetty Wap featuring Monty	7
"G.D.F.R."	Flo Rida featuring Sage the Gemini and Lookas	8
"Nasty Freestyle"	T-Wayne	9
"Downtown"	Macklemore & Ryan Lewis featuring Eric Nally, Melle Mel, Kool Moe Dee and Grandmaster Caz	12
"Jumpman"	Drake and Future	12
"Truffle Butter"	Nicki Minaj featuring Drake and Lil Wayne	14
"All Day"	Kanye West featuring Theophilus London, Allan Kingdom and Paul McCartney	15
"Hit the Quan"	iLoveMemphis	15
"Antidote"	Travis Scott	16
"CoCo"	O.T. Genasis	20
"All Eyes on You"	Meek Mill featuring Nicki Minaj and Chris Brown	21
"Ayo"	Chris Brown and Tyga	21
"Back to Back"	Drake	21
"Classic Man"	Jidenna featuring Roman GianArthur	22
"WTF (Where They From)"	Missy Elliott featuring Pharrell Williams	22
"Energy"	Drake	26
"Flex (Ooh, Ooh, Ooh)"	Rich Homie Quan	26
"Blessings"	Big Sean featuring Drake	28
"Where Ya At"	Future featuring Drake	28
"Throw Sum Mo"	Rae Sremmurd featuring Nicki Minaj and Young Thug	30
"The Night Is Still Young"	Nicki Minaj	31
"Again"	Fetty Wap	33
"Only One"	Kanye West featuring Paul McCartney	35
"Straight Outta Compton"	N.W.A.	38
"Feeling Myself"	Nicki Minaj featuring Beyoncé	39
"R.I.C.O."	Meek Mill featuring Drake	40

== Highest first-week consumption ==
List of top 10 albums with the highest first-week consumption (sales + streaming + track equivalent), as of October 6, 2015 in the US.
Number	Album	Artist	1st-week consumption	1st-week position	Refs
1	If You're Reading This It's Too Late	Drake	535,000	1	
2	What a Time to Be Alive	Drake & Future	375,000	1	
3	To Pimp a Butterfly	Kendrick Lamar	363,000	1	
4	Compton	Dr. Dre	295,000	2	
5	Dreams Worth More Than Money	Meek Mill	245,000	1	
6	Dark Sky Paradise	Big Sean	173,000	1	
7	DS2	Future	151,000	1	
8	At. Long. Last. ASAP	ASAP Rocky	146,000	1	
9	The Incredible True Story	Logic	135,000	3	
10	When It's Dark Out	G-Eazy	132,000	5	

== All critically reviewed albums ranked ==
=== Metacritic ===
Number	Artist	Album	Average score	Number of reviews	Reference
1	Kendrick Lamar	To Pimp a Butterfly	96	44 reviews	
2	Vince Staples	Summertime '06	87	24 reviews	
3	Donnie Trumpet & The Social Experiment	Surf	86	17 reviews	
4	Pusha T	King Push – Darkest Before Dawn: The Prelude	85	22 reviews	
5	Fashawn	The Ecology	84	4 reviews	
6	Young Fathers	White Men Are Black Men Too	83	22 reviews	
7	Dr. Dre	Compton	82	36 reviews	
8	Angel Haze	Back to the Woods	82	5 reviews	
9	Earl Sweatshirt	I Don't Like Shit, I Don't Go Outside: An Album by Earl Sweatshirt	81	31 reviews	
10	MED, Blu & Madlib	Bad Neighbor	81	5 reviews	
11	Skyzoo	Music for My Friends	81	4 reviews	
12	Future	Beast Mode	81	4 reviews	
13	Young Thug	Slime Season 2	81	4 reviews	
14	Future	DS2	80	22 reviews	
15	Roots Manuva	Bleeds	80	17 reviews	
16	Lupe Fiasco	Tetsuo & Youth	80	12 reviews	
17	Oddisee	The Good Fight	80	8 reviews	
18	Little Simz	A Curious Tale of Trials + Persons	80	6 reviews	
19	Young Thug	Slime Season	80	4 reviews	
20	K-os	Can't Fly Without Gravity	80	4 reviews	
21	Lizzo	Big Grrrl Small World	79	10 reviews	
22	Jay Rock	90059	79	7 reviews	
23	The Game	The Documentary 2.5	79	6 reviews	
24	CZARFACE	Every Hero Needs a Villain	79	5 reviews	
25	Drake	If You're Reading This It's Too Late	78	33 reviews	
26	Rae Sremmurd	Sremmlife	78	15 reviews	
27	Freddie Gibbs	Shadow of a Doubt	78	12 reviews	
28	Le1f	Riot Boi	78	7 reviews	
29	Curren$y	Pilot Talk III	78	4 reviews	
30	Action Bronson	Mr. Wonderful	77	17 reviews	
31	Main Attrakionz	808s & Dark Grapes III	77	4 reviews	
32	A$AP Rocky	AT.LONG.LAST.A$AP	76	33 reviews	
33	BADBADNOTGOOD & Ghostface Killah	Sour Soul	76	21 reviews	
34	Ty Dolla $ign	Free TC	76	16 reviews	
35	Heems	Eat Pray Thug	76	12 reviews	
36	Blackalicious	Imani Vol. 1	76	9 reviews	
37	Joey Bada$$	B4.DA.$$	75	27 reviews	
38	The Game	The Documentary 2	75	13 reviews	
39	Logic	The Incredible True Story	75	7 reviews	
40	Murs	Have a Nice Life	75	5 reviews	
41	Chinx	Welcome to JFK	75	4 reviews	
42	Meek Mill	Dreams Worth More Than Money	74	13 reviews	
43	Boosie Badazz	Touch Down 2 Cause Hell	74	10 reviews	
44	G-Eazy	When It's Dark Out	74	4 reviews	
45	Death Grips	The Powers That B	73	6 reviews	
46	Jadakiss	Top 5 Dead or Alive	73	5 reviews	
47	The Underachievers	Evermore: The Art of Duality	73	4 reviews	
48	Big Sean	Dark Sky Paradise	72	19 reviews	
49	Ghostface Killah	Twelve Reasons to Die II	72	18 reviews	
50	Young Thug	Barter 6	72	13 reviews	
51	GoldLink	And After That, We Didn't Talk	72	6 reviews	
52	Cannibal Ox	Blade of the Ronin	71	16 reviews	
53	Mac Miller	GO:OD AM	71	14 reviews	
54	Dom Kennedy	By Dom Kennedy	71	4 reviews	
55	Drake & Future	What A Time To Be Alive	70	24 reviews	
56	Public Enemy	Man Plans God Laughs	70	7 reviews	
57	Gangrene	You Disgust Me	70	4 reviews	
58	Tyler, The Creator	Cherry Bomb	69	23 reviews	
59	Snoop Dogg	Bush	69	20 reviews	
60	Statik Selektah	Lucky 7	69	6 reviews	
61	Puff Daddy	MMM	69	5 reviews	
62	Jeezy	Church In These Streets	69	5 reviews	
63	Fetty Wap	Fetty Wap	68	11 reviews	
64	Gunplay	Living Legend	68	8 reviews	
65	Wale	The Album About Nothing	67	10 reviews	
66	Migos	Yung Rich Nation	67	9 reviews	
67	Travis Scott	Rodeo	64	15 reviews	
68	Yelawolf	Love Story	64	10 reviews	
69	Raekwon	Fly International Luxurious Art	63	17 reviews	
70	Ludacris	Ludaversal	63	11 reviews	
71	DJ Khaled	I Changed a Lot	63	4 reviews	
72	Doomtree	All Hands	62	5 reviews	
73	Lil Wayne	Free Weezy Album	61	10 reviews	
74	Rick Ross	Black Market	61	9 reviews	
75	Lil Durk	Remember My Name	61	8 reviews	
76	Troy Ave	Major Without A Deal	61	5 reviews	
77	Brodinski	Brava	61	4 reviews	
78	Lil Wayne	Sorry 4 the Wait 2	60	5 reviews	
79	Method Man	The Meth Lab	59	11 reviews	
80	Kid Ink	Full Speed	55	10 reviews	
81	Chris Brown & Tyga	Fan of a Fan: The Album	46	6 reviews	
82	Tyga	The Gold Album	45	4 reviews	
83	Kid Cudi	Speedin Bullet 2 Heaven	44	5 reviews	

=== AnyDecentMusic? ===
Number	Artist	Album	Average score	Number of reviews	Reference
1	Kendrick Lamar	To Pimp a Butterfly	9.3	37 reviews	
2	Vince Staples	Summertime '06	8.4	19 reviews	
3	Pusha T	King Push – Darkest Before Dawn: The Prelude	8.0	20 reviews	
4	Dr. Dre	Compton	7.8	28 reviews	
5	Roots Manuva	Bleeds	7.8	26 reviews	

== See also ==
- Previous article: 2014 in hip-hop
- Next article: 2016 in hip-hop
