= Detroit vs. Everybody =

Single by Eminem, Royce da 5'9", Big Sean, Danny Brown, DeJ Loaf and Trick Trick

from the album Shady XV
- Released: November 11, 2014
- Recorded: 2014
- Studio: Effigy Studios (Ferndale, Michigan) Another Showoff Bassment (Brooklyn, New York) DPA Studios (Oak Park, Michigan)
- Genre: Hip hop
- Length: 5:57
- Label: Shady; Interscope
- Songwriters: Marshall Mathers; Ryan Montgomery; Deja Trimble; Daniel Sewell; Sean Anderson; Patrick Baril; James Brown; Peter Beveridge; Andy James; Jon Trotti
- Producers: Statik Selektah; Eminem

Eminem singles chronology
"Guts Over Fear" (2014)	"Detroit vs. Everybody" (2014)	"Best Friend" (2015)

Royce da 5'9" singles chronology
"Twerk Dat, Pop That" (2014)	"Detroit vs. Everybody" (2014)	"T.D.M.T.L.T.A.M" (2015)

Big Sean singles chronology
"Paradise" (2014)	"Detroit vs. Everybody" (2014)	"Open Wide" (2015)

Danny Brown singles chronology
"Rambunctious" (2014)	"Detroit vs. Everybody" (2014)	"Frankie Sinatra" (2016)

Dej Loaf singles chronology
"We Good" (2014)	"Detroit vs. Everybody" (2014)	"Be Real" (2015)

Trick Trick singles chronology
"Twerk Dat Pop That" (2014)	"Detroit vs. Everybody" (2014)

Music video
- "Detroit vs. Everybody" on YouTube

"Detroit vs. Everybody" is a song by American rappers Eminem, Royce da 5'9", Big Sean, Danny Brown, Dej Loaf, and Trick Trick, featured on the Shady Records compilation album Shady XV (2014). Produced by Statik Selektah and Eminem, the track was recorded in 2014, at Effigy Studios and DPA Studios in Ferndale and Oak Park, Michigan respectively, and Another Showoff Basement, based in Brooklyn, New York. The song was released as the fourth and final single from the album, on November 11, 2014, through both Shady Records and Interscope Records.

Taking its title from a clothing line founded by Tommey Walker, "Detroit vs. Everybody" is a hip-hop posse cut where each included Detroit rapper explains how they managed to rise above the struggle to stardom from their hometown while still representing it. The song received positive reviews from music critics who called it one of the best tracks off the album. "Detroit vs. Everybody" charted at number 28 on the US Billboard Hot R&B/Hip-Hop Songs chart and peaked at number 8 on the Bubbling Under Hot 100 chart. The accompanying music video for the song, directed by Syndrome, was shot in black-and-white showing various locations in Detroit.

== Recording and production ==
"Detroit vs. Everybody" was recorded during various sessions for Shady XV – at Effigy Studios in Ferndale, Michigan by Mike and Joe Strange; at DPA Studios in Oak Park, Michigan by I.V. Duncan; and at Another Showoff Bassment in Brooklyn, New York by producer Statik Selektah. It features additional keyboards by Luis Resto, and was mixed by Eminem and Mike Strange at Effigy Studios. The hip hop track contains samples of the James Brown song "Funky Drummer", as well as Peter Beveridge's "Static on the Frequency", co-written by Andy James and Jon Trotti.

== Music and lyrics ==
In a review of "Detroit vs. Everybody" for Rolling Stone, writer Kory Grow outlined that the song features "Several generations of the Motor City's most vital rhymers [revisiting] the struggle they rose above to break out of their hometown while still defending it", with lead artist Eminem reminiscing about his "pre-megastar days". The song has been described as "a rap rally cry for the Motor City", seeing the artists "defending [the city] against haters". The title of the song is taken from a clothing line founded by Detroit native Tommey Walker.

== Critical reception ==
Professional ratings
Review scores
Source	Rating
Rolling Stone	3/5 stars

Media response to "Detroit vs. Everybody" was generally positive. Kory Grow of Rolling Stone awarded the single three out of five stars, describing the song as "an appropriately reflective coda" for Shady XV and praising the performances in particular of Eminem and Big Sean, the latter of whose verse he claimed "hits hardest". Complex writer Zach Frydenlund praised the track, claiming that it was "the most anticipated song" to be featured on Shady XV. David Jeffries of AllMusic likened the posse cut to "a Marvel vs. DC crossover", while a review by Barry Nicolson for the NME highlighted it alongside "Y'all Ready Know" by Slaughterhouse and "Down" by Yelawolf as a highlight of the record.

== Commercial performance ==
In the United States, the single charted at number 42 on Billboard's Digital Song Sales chart and number 28 on the Hot R&B/Hip-Hop Songs chart, and peaked at number 8 on their Bubbling Under Hot 100 chart. In Australia, the single charted at number 86 on the Australian Recording Industry Association's Australian Singles Chart. In Canada, the single charted at number 7 on the Canadian Hot 100.

== Music video ==
The music video for "Detroit vs. Everybody" was directed by Syndrome (who also worked on the videos for Eminem's "Berzerk", "Rap God" and "Guts Over Fear"), and released on January 23, 2015. It was described as "a star-studded, gorgeous black-and-white music video" by Spin magazine's James Grebey, who detailed that "The footage is crisp and austere, giving the assembled talent lots of room to play around and show off their considerable skills and admiration for their hometown". The video was filmed in various locations in Detroit, including Ford Field, Henry the Hatter and Comerica Park; it features Royce and Loaf performing "on rooftops", and Brown and Sean "in a pair of dilapidated buildings".

== Track listing ==
No.	Title	Writer(s)	Producer(s)	Length
1.	"Detroit vs. Everybody" (performed by Eminem, Royce da 5'9", Big Sean, Danny Brown, DeJ Loaf and Trick Trick)	Marshall Mathers; Ryan Montgomery; Deja Trimble; Daniel Sewell; Sean Anderson; Patrick Baril; James Brown; Peter Beveridge; Andy James; Jon Trotti	Statik Selektah; Eminem	5:57

== Personnel ==
Credits adapted from Shady XV album notes.

- Statik Selektah – production, recording
- Eminem – production, mixing
- Mike Strange – recording, mixing
- Joe Strange – recording
- I.V. Duncan – recording
- Luis Resto – keyboards

== Charts ==
Chart (2014)	Peak position
Australia (ARIA)	86
Canadian Hot 100 (Billboard)	87
US Bubbling Under Hot 100 (Billboard)	8
US Digital Songs (Billboard)	42
US Hot R&B/Hip-Hop Songs (Billboard)	28
