= Until It's Gone =

Until It's Gone may refer to:

== Songs ==
- "Until It's Gone" (Monica song), by Monica, 2011.
- "Until It's Gone" (Linkin Park song), by Linkin Park, 2014.
- "Til It's Gone", by Kenny Chesney, 2014.
- "Till It's Gone", by Yelawolf, 2014.
- "Til It's Gone", by Britney Spears from Britney Jean, 2013.
