= Box Chevy V =

Single by Yelawolf

from the album Love Story
- Released: January 27, 2014
- Recorded: Blackbird (Berry Hill, Tennessee)
- Genre: Hip-hop
- Length: 3:29
- Label: Shady; Interscope
- Songwriters: Michael Atha; William Washington; Michael Hartnett; Matthew Hayes
- Producer: WLPWR

Yelawolf singles chronology
| "Cuz I'm Famous" (2013) | "Box Chevy V" (2014) | "Honey Brown" (2014) |

"Box Chevy V" is a song by American hip-hop recording artist Yelawolf, featured on his 2015 album Love Story. Written by Yelawolf, producer WLPWR, guitarist Mike Hartnett and mixing engineer Matthew Hayes, it is the fifth entry in Yelawolf's "Box Chevy" song series. The song was released as the first single from the album on January 27, 2014.

== Recording and production ==
Like much of Love Story, "Box Chevy V" was recorded at Blackbird Studios in Nashville, Tennessee with mixing engineer Matthew Hayes and producer William "WLPWR" Washington, who also performed keyboards, pads, drums and programming on the song; Mike Hartnett performed guitar and DJ Klever performed turntables. The track contains a reference to the song "Still D.R.E.", by Dr. Dre featuring Snoop Dogg, in the second verse.

"Box Chevy V" is the fifth entry in Yelawolf's "Box Chevy" song series, following "My Box Chevy" (from 2007's Ball of Flames: The Ballad of Slick Rick E. Bobby), "Box Chevy Part 2" (from 2008's Stereo: A Hip Hop Tribute to Classic Rock), "Box Chevy Pt. 3" (from 2010's Trunk Muzik), and "Box Chevy Pt. 4" (from 2013's Trunk Muzik Returns).

== Music and lyrics ==
Trevor Smith of HotNewHipHop.com notes that the song features "swirling synth sounds", and that the lyrics contain references to "old cars and Jack Daniel's". Similarly, Edwin Ortiz of Complex magazine explains that in "Box Chevy V", Yelawolf "gets straight to the point here by describing his affection for his ride". A writer for Uproxx describes the song thus: ""Box Chevy V" starts off low-key and unexpectedly turns into a two-stepping country jam, where producer WillPower of SupaHotBeats mixes Wolf’s Southern synth sound with more of a refined West Coast bounce".

== Music video ==
The music video for "Box Chevy V" was released on April 4, 2014, and is described as "dedicated to the classic cars of [Yelawolf's] hometown".

== Critical reception ==
Media response to "Box Chevy V" was generally positive. Trevor Smith of HotNewHipHop.com claimed that the song "should satisfy fans of [Yelawolf's 2010 mixtape] Trunk Muzik", noting that it featured "swirling synth sounds that colored much of the project, as well as the same punchy southern melodies". Uproxx praised both the lyrical and musical style of the track, concluding that "this track works and could very well be the crossover record Yela's needed for a while".

== Personnel ==
Credits adapted from Love Story album notes.

- WLPWR – keyboards, pads, drums, programming, record producer
- Mike Hartnett – guitar
- DJ Klever – turntables
- Matthew Hayes – recording, mixing
- Randy Warnken – mixing assistance

== Certifications ==
Certifications for "Box Chevy V"
| Region | Certification | Certified units/sales |
|---|---|---|
| New Zealand (RMNZ) | Gold | 15,000^{‡} |
^{‡} Sales+streaming figures based on certification alone.
