= Guts Over Fear =

Single by Eminem featuring Sia

from the album Shady XV
- Released: August 25, 2014
- Studio: Effigy Studios (Ferndale, Michigan)
- Genre: Hip hop; pop
- Length: 5:01; 4:07 (radio edit)
- Label: Shady; Interscope
- Songwriters: Marshall Mathers; Sia Furler; Emile Haynie; John Hill; Luis Resto
- Producers: Emile Haynie; John Hill

Eminem singles chronology
"Calm Down" (2014)	"Guts Over Fear" (2014)	"Detroit vs. Everybody" (2014)

Sia singles chronology
"Big Girls Cry" (2014)	"Guts Over Fear" (2014)	"You're Never Fully Dressed Without a Smile" (2014)

Music video
- "Guts Over Fear" on YouTube

"Guts Over Fear" is a song by American rapper Eminem featuring Australian singer-songwriter Sia, from Eminem's compilation album Shady XV, released on August 25, 2014. This song is included in the closing credits of the film, The Equalizer.

== Background ==
Previews of the song premiered in trailers and during the end credits for the film, The Equalizer starring Denzel Washington. The song was officially released to iTunes on August 25, 2014, the same day Eminem announced his plans to release an album later that year.

== Content ==
The song's subject matter concerns Eminem and his struggles as an artist, and touches on moments of his career. Australian singer Sia provides the chorus, making this the second time the artists have collaborated, the first being "Beautiful Pain" from the deluxe version of The Marshall Mathers LP 2.

== Music video ==
Eminem posted a picture on Instagram to serve as a sneak peek for the upcoming music video. The video premiered on November 24, via VEVO, was filmed in Detroit, Michigan, directed by Syndrome and starred Alexander Wraith and America's Next Top Model cycle 21 contestant, Winnie Harlow.

== Chart performance ==
The song debuted at number 22 on the Billboard Hot 100, selling 134,328 copies in its first week of release.

== Track listing ==
Digital Download

No.	Title	Writer(s)	Producer(s)	Length
1.	"Guts Over Fear" (featuring Sia)	Marshall Mathers; Sia Furler; Emile Haynie; John Hill; Luis Resto	Emile Haynie; John Hill	5:01

== Charts ==
=== Weekly charts ===
Chart (2014)	Peak position
Australia (ARIA)	22
Austria (Ö3 Austria Top 40)	53
Belgium (Ultratip Bubbling Under Flanders)	15
Belgium Urban (Ultratop Flanders)	13
Belgium (Ultratip Bubbling Under Wallonia)	27
Brazil (ABPD)	47
Canada Hot 100 (Billboard)	9
Czech Republic Singles Digital (ČNS IFPI)	87
Denmark (Tracklisten)	22
France (SNEP)	10
Hungary (Single Top 40)	24
Germany (GfK)	35
Italy (FIMI)	45
New Zealand (Recorded Music NZ)	22
Slovakia Singles Digital (ČNS IFPI)	85
Sweden (Sverigetopplistan)	40
Switzerland (Schweizer Hitparade)	30
UK Singles (Official Charts)	10
US Billboard Hot 100	22
US Hot R&B/Hip-Hop Songs (Billboard)	6

=== Year-end charts ===
Chart (2014)	Position
US Hot R&B/Hip-Hop Songs (Billboard)	96

== Certifications ==
Region	Certification	Certified units/sales
Australia (ARIA)	Platinum	70,000^{‡}
Brazil (Pro-Música Brasil)	Platinum	60,000^{‡}
New Zealand (RMNZ)	Gold	7,500^{*}
United Kingdom (BPI)	Silver	200,000^{‡}
United States (RIAA)	Platinum	1,000,000^{‡}
^{*} Sales figures based on certification alone.^{‡} Sales+streaming figures based on certification alone.
