= Best Friend (Yelawolf song) =

Single by Yelawolf featuring Eminem

from the album Love Story
- Released: April 14, 2015
- Genre: Alternative hip-hop; rap rock
- Length: 5:14
- Label: Shady; Interscope
- Songwriters: Michael Atha; Marshall Mathers; William Washington; Luis Resto
- Producers: WLPWR; Eminem (co.)

Yelawolf singles chronology
"American You" (2015)	"Best Friend" (2015)	"Johnny Cash" (2015)

Eminem singles chronology
"Detroit vs. Everybody" (2014)	"Best Friend" (2015)	"Phenomenal" (2015)

Music video
- "Best Friend ft. Eminem (Official Music Video)" on YouTube

"Best Friend" is a song by American rapper Yelawolf featuring fellow American rapper Eminem. It was released on April 14, 2015 as the fifth single from the former's second studio album Love Story (2015) via Shady and Interscope Records. It was later included on Eminem's second greatest hits album Curtain Call 2 (2022), with Shady, Interscope, and Aftermath Entertainment.

== Track listing ==
Digital download
No.	Title	Writer(s)	Producer(s)	Length
1.	"Best Friend" (featuring Eminem)	Michael Atha; Marshall Mathers; William Washington; Luis Resto	WLPWR; Eminem^{[a]}	5:14

Notes

- ^{^[a]} signifies a co-producer.

== Music video ==
On April 24, 2015, Yelawolf uploaded the music video for "Best Friend" on his YouTube and Vevo account.

== Charts ==
=== Weekly charts ===
Chart (2015)	Peak position
Belgium (Ultratop 50 Flanders)	48
Belgium Urban (Ultratop Flanders)	18
Canada Hot 100 (Billboard)	41
US Bubbling Under Hot 100 (Billboard)	3
US Hot R&B/Hip-Hop Songs (Billboard)	16

== Certifications ==
Region	Certification	Certified units/sales
New Zealand (RMNZ)	Platinum	30,000^{‡}
United States (RIAA)	Platinum	1,000,000^{‡}
^{‡} Sales+streaming figures based on certification alone.
