= Seed of 6ix =

American hip-hop group

- Also known as: Seed of 6ix
- Origin: Memphis, Tennessee, U.S.
- Genres: Hip hop; crunk; gangsta rap; horrorcore; memphis rap; Southern hip hop
- Years active: 2014–present
- Label: Scale-A-Ton (2018−present); Yung & Dumb (2014–2018)
- Members: Locodunit; Lil Infamous
- Past members: Rebelyus; Trigg Bambino
- Website: Official website

Seed of 6ix is an American hip-hop group from Memphis, Tennessee, composed of Locodunit and Lil Infamous, who are the nephews of the co-founder of hip-hop group Three 6 Mafia, DJ Paul. Lil Infamous is also the son of former co-founder Lord Infamous.

== History ==
Locodunit and Lil Infamous started the group in late 2014 and released their debut album Faces of Gospel on February 6, 2015. The album is available on various digital platforms. Their style is widely considered as horrorcore, crunk and gangsta rap. The group began in 2014 in Memphis, Tennessee with Lil Infamous (Ricky Dunigan, Jr.) and Locodunit (Thomas Dunigan) for the sake of rapper DJ Paul. Seed of 6ix released several Mixtapes & EPs starting with Planet 6ix Chpt 3.6 on May 1, 2015. As well as solo projects on Young N Dumb, their independent label. Signed to Scale-A-Ton Entertainment DJ Paul's label in 2018. DJ Paul is responsible for bringing a fault into the reckoning against the group's musical career and has since produced numerous singles and the last work for the group was released the first album Faces of Gospel (2015). The name comes from hip hop group Three 6 Mafia (The Seed of 6ix).

The duo is a collaboration between Lil Infamous and Locodunit, who are well-established individual recording artists in the underground hip hop scene in Memphis, Tennessee. Their first collaboration was on the debut album "Planet 6ix Chpt 3.6" (2016), with them appearing regularly on each other's albums thereafter.

In 2016, the duo released "Seed Of 6ix Chapter 2", which turned out to be the biggest commercial success for both artists. The album was released on Young N Dumb. The album reached number 62 on the Billboard 200, number 10 on the Top R&B/Hip-Hop Albums chart and number 7 on the Top Rap Albums chart. Earlier, the artists had 2 appearances in the Top R&B / Hip-Hop chart among them, this was the first in the top 10.

The first release of Scale-A-Ton Entertainment was a double singles titled "Break The Law" (2016), "Lyrical Drive By" (2017), "Get Buck" (2018). It was released in 2018 by the independent label.

Locodunit's younger brother, Ant Dunit (Timothy Dunigan), is also a rapper and sometimes appears on Seed of 6ix albums.

== Studio albums ==
Year	Album	Billboard 200
2015	Faces of Gospel	100
2016	Smoke n' Mirrors	–
2018	A Beginners Guide to Destruction	–
