= Reuben Houston =

American football player and rapper (born 1982)

Profile
- Position: Cornerback

Personal information
- Born: October 30, 1982 (age 44); Miami, Fl
- Listed height: 6 ft 0 in (1.83 m)
- Listed weight: 192 lb (87 kg)

Career information
- College: Georgia Tech

Reuben James Houston (born October 30, 1982) better known by his stage name Rico Richie is an American rapper and former cornerback for the Georgia Tech Yellow Jackets football team from 2002 to 2005.

== Football career ==
Houston had 158 career tackles, 16 pass breakups, 12 tackles for loss, five forced fumbles and three fumble recoveries. He is also a former all-ACC triple jumper for Georgia Tech's track team.

Houston graduated on December 17, 2005, with a degree in management. He was signed as a free agent on a tryout contract by the Tampa Bay Buccaneers on May 8, 2006, but was released on August 6, 2006.

== Legal Troubles ==
On June 22, 2005, he was arrested for allegedly conspiring to distribute 94 pounds of marijuana worth $60,000. Houston was subsequently suspended from the Tech football team, but was reinstated following a judge's controversial order that Houston must be allowed to play football at Tech. Houston was sentenced on April 4, 2006, to nine months probation as part of a plea deal.

In December 2006, Houston was arrested in Florida for possession of over 20 grams of marijuana. He began a year-and-one-month prison sentence in June 2007 and was released in May 2008.

In March 2010, Houston surrendered to the Cobb County jail on outstanding warrants for terroristic threats, aggravated assault and possession of a firearm by a convicted felon.

== Hip-Hop Career ==
Houston is currently pursuing a career in rap music. He goes by the stage name of "Rico Richie" and received popularity with his single "Poppin" (prod. 808 Mafia) released in 2015. Houston is currently distributed by La Familia Entertainment.
