= Henry the Hatter =

American retail store

Henry the Hatter is a retail store in Detroit, Michigan. It was founded by Henry Komrofsky in 1893.

== History ==
Henry Komrofsky had worked as a hatter at the John C. Hartz shop before deciding to open up his own shop. Gustave Newman was a young stock and delivery boy for Komrofsky in the year 1904. In 1919, Newman and Komrofsky started to run the store as partners. Shortly after the two began their partnership, the store moved to the Library Park Hotel Building, on Gratiot and Library street. A second store was built in 1923 on Michigan avenue in the Lafayette Building. Henry Komrofsky died in 1941, and Newman continued to run the store. In the late 1940s, Newman sold the store to Seymour Wasserman, a New Yorker who worked in his uncle's factory before buying his own in 1939. In 1952, the original Gratiot Avenue store was demolished, and the store moved to Broadway street in Detroit, where it still stands today. In 1960, the second store on Michigan Avenue closed, but was relocated to Griswold Ave in 1961. In 1962, the store was destroyed in a fire. Seymour Wasserman continued to run the original store until 1973. His son Paul Wasserman currently owns the shop and has since 1973. Seymour died in 1998 at 83 years old.

Henry the Hatter was a hat factory until 1985. The hat factory was able to create special custom hats within a few hours of the order. The store is also known for its kindness towards its customers and closeness to those who buy hats from the store. Celebrities Run DMC, LL Cool J, Kid Rock, and Steve Harvey are all store regulars, and Kid Rock featured the store in his video for "Roll On".

Henry the Hatter received notable recognition after 34th president Dwight D Eisenhower wore a hat from the store at his inauguration. Henry the Hatter has been recognized by the Historical Society of Michigan and has been named "Hat Retailer of the Year" twice.

On June 30, 2017 it was announced that the Detroit store, which had been at its current location since 1952, would be closing on August 5, 2017, after the lease to the building was lost.

On December 7, 2017 the Detroit store re-opened at 2472 Riopelle St. in Detroit's Eastern Market.
