= Shady XV =

Hip hop compilation album

Compilation album / greatest hits album by Shady Records
- Released: November 24, 2014
- Recorded: Disc X: 2014; Disc V: 2000–12
- Genre: Hip-hop
- Length: 123:11
- Labels: Shady; Interscope
- Producers: Eminem (exec.) Disc X: Boi-1da; Conrad Clifton; DJ Premier; Emile Haynie; Eminem; John Hill; Just Blaze; Luis Resto; Marv Won; The Maven Boys; Mr. Porter; Statik Selektah; WLPWR; Disc V: Apex; AraabMuzik; Dr. Dre; Eminem; Emile Haynie; Jeff Bass; John "J-Praize" Freeman; Katalyst; Luis Resto; Mike Elizondo; Mr. Porter; Mr. Pyro; Witt & Pep; WLPWR

Shady Records compilation chronology
Eminem Presents: The Re-Up (2006)	Shady XV (2014)	Southpaw (Music from and Inspired by the Motion Picture) (2015)

Singles from Shady XV
- 1. "Guts Over Fear" Released: August 25, 2014; 2. "Till It's Gone" Released: September 16, 2014; 3. "Y'all Ready Know" Released: November 3, 2014; 4. "Detroit vs. Everybody" Released: November 11, 2014

Shady XV (stylized as SHⱯDYXV, pronounced "shady fifteen") is a hip hop compilation album performed by various artists of Shady Records. The double disc album was released on November 24, 2014, by Shady Records and Interscope Records. The album was released in honor of the label's 15th anniversary and as its 15th project (excluding Eminem's solo releases). The compilation consists of two discs, the first featuring new material from Shady Records artists such as Slaughterhouse, Bad Meets Evil, D12 and Yelawolf, as well as the label's founder Eminem. The second disc includes the label's greatest hits, also featuring former Shady Records members. All previous and current members of the label are represented on the album.

== Release and promotion ==
On June 3, 2014, Eminem's manager and Shady Records co-founder Paul Rosenberg tweeted "Shady XV". On August 23, 2014, during his final stop of The Monster Tour with Rihanna at Detroit, Michigan's Comerica Park, Eminem wore a T-shirt branded "Shady XV". On August 25, 2014, he tweeted "Yes it's official... #SHADYXV Black Friday," leading to speculation about a release on Black Friday, which fell on November 28, 2014. He also released a 20-second teaser video, featuring images of Eminem and other Shady Records artists. On the same day, August 25, a press release was issued on Eminem's official website, announcing that Shady XV, a two-disc compilation featuring a collection of Shady Records' greatest hits on one disc and new material from Eminem, Slaughterhouse, Bad Meets Evil, D12, and Yelawolf on the other, was set to release on November 24, 2014, in the week of Black Friday.

On October 13, 2014, Eminem posted a video on various social media websites of the artwork, along with the description "Back to basics! Here's the cover for #SHADYXV out 11/24." The cover depicts a black and red hockey mask under two crossed chainsaws.

The album was released on disc and as a digital download on November 24, 2014, as the 15th release on the label (excluding Eminem's solo releases) and 15 years after its inception. The "greatest hits" disc contains tracks by current Shady Records members, as well as previous members 50 Cent, Obie Trice, Bobby Creekwater, Ca$his and Stat Quo. The track list was revealed on October 29, 2014, on the official website.

A rap cypher by Eminem, Slaughterhouse, and Yelawolf, titled 'SHADY CXVPHER', premiered on Vevo on November 10, 2014, to promote the album. On November 18, 2014, Eminem revealed info about the "Lose Yourself" demo version, the last track on the second disc. It contains alternate lyrics to the original beat that were recorded but never published. Eminem had no memory of this scrapped version until he was recently reminded.

== Music and lyrics ==
"Guts Over Fear" is about Eminem and his struggles as an artist, and touches up on moments of his career. "Detroit vs. Everybody" is a posse cut which features Eminem and fellow Detroit natives Royce da 5'9", Big Sean, Danny Brown, Trick-Trick, and Dej Loaf rapping over a boom bap beat.

== Singles ==
The first single, "Guts Over Fear", which features vocals by Australian singer-songwriter Sia and production from Emile Haynie, was previewed in the trailer for the film The Equalizer, released on June 16, 2014 (with its title not yet revealed). A TV spot for the film was released on August 24, 2014, and aired during the 2014 MTV Video Music Awards, at the end of which it was promoted as "featuring the new song Eminem feat. Sia 'Guts Over Fear' from Shady XV - Black Friday". The song was a new leak before it was released a day later on the iTunes Store. It was later confirmed that the track would also roll during the closing credits of The Equalizer. The second single, "Y'all Ready Know" by Slaughterhouse, was released on November 4, 2014. The music video was released the same day. The third and last single, "Detroit vs. Everybody" by Eminem, Trick-Trick, Dej Loaf, Big Sean, Royce Da 5'9", and Danny Brown, premiered on Eminem's radio channel Shade 45 on November 10, 2014. It was officially released on iTunes later that night.

== Critical reception ==
Professional ratings
Aggregate scores
Source	Rating
Metacritic	61/100
Review scores
Source	Rating
AllMusic	4/5 stars
Entertainment Weekly	B
Exclaim!	7/10
HipHopDX	4/5 stars
Knoxville News Sentinel	3/5 stars
The National	3/5 stars
New York Daily News	4/5 stars
The New Zealand Herald	2/5 stars
Pitchfork	2/10
The Plain Dealer	B+

According to the review aggregator Metacritic, Shady XV received "generally favorable reviews" based on a weighted average score of 61 out of 100 from 9 critic scores. Samantha O'Connor of Exclaim! said, "For the Shady diehard fans, Shady XV is enough. But for those searching for that nostalgic surge of adrenaline-inducing passion and innovative content reminiscent of the Shady reign, it's better to skip the new material and head straight to the classics." Kyle Anderson of Entertainment Weekly said, "Shady's first half is, like most new Eminem material, more problematic but also more rewarding. With its aggro-horrorcore production, trapped-in-2001 cultural nods (there's a reference to former congressman Gary Condit), and Billy Squier sample, it's essentially The Marshall Mathers LP 2.5, with all the accompanying dicey gender politics."

Homer Johnsen of HipHopDX said, "Some songs border on perfection. A few more are just solidly average. Yet, it all balances out, and the rhymes on full display make Shady XV a great compilation release."

== Commercial performance ==
The album debuted at number three on the Billboard 200 chart, with first-week sales of 138,000 copies in the United States. In its second week, the album dropped to number 21 on the chart, selling 28,000 copies. In its third week, the album dropped to number 37 on the chart, selling 18,000 copies. In its fourth week the album dropped to number 54 on the chart, selling 17,000 copies. As of June 27, 2015, Shady XV has been certified gold by the Recording Industry Association of America for shipping more than half-million units (in this case, 250,000 copies double album sets, which are double-counted by the RIAA).

== Track listing ==
Disc one (X)
No.	Title	Writer(s)	Producer(s)	Length
1.	"Shady XV" (performed by Eminem)	Marshall Mathers; William Squier	Eminem	5:01
2.	"Psychopath Killer" (performed by Slaughterhouse featuring Eminem and Yelawolf)	Dominick Wickliffe; Ryan Montgomery; Mathers; Luis Resto; Michael Atha; Matthew Samuels; Zale Epstein; Brett Kruger; Daniel Daley; Justin Smith	Boi-1da; The Maven Boys^{[a]}; Just Blaze^{[a]}	5:19
3.	"Die Alone" (performed by Eminem featuring Kobe)	Mathers; Resto	Eminem; Luis Resto^{[b]}	3:36
4.	"Vegas" (performed by Bad Meets Evil)	Mathers; Montgomery; Resto	Eminem; Resto^{[b]}	5:36
5.	"Y'all Ready Know" (performed by Slaughterhouse)	Wickliffe; Montgomery; Joell Ortiz; Joe Budden; Christopher Martin	DJ Premier	3:51
6.	"Guts Over Fear" (performed by Eminem featuring Sia)	Mathers; Resto; Emile Haynie; John Hill; Sia Furler	Emile Haynie; John Hill; Eminem^{[a]}	5:01
7.	"Down" (performed by Yelawolf)	Atha; Clifton Rogers; Don Nix	Conrad Clifton	3:26
8.	"Bane" (performed by Kon Artis, Swifty McVay, Bizarre & Kuniva of D12)	Denaun Porter; Marvin O'Neal; Ondre Moore; Rufus Johnson; Von Carlisle	Mr. Porter; Marv Won^{[a]}	4:24
9.	"Fine Line" (performed by Eminem)	Mathers; Resto	Eminem; Resto^{[b]}	5:07
10.	"Twisted" (performed by Skylar Grey, Eminem and Yelawolf)	Mathers; Resto; Atha; Holly Hafermann; Herb Rooney	Eminem; Resto^{[b]}	4:59
11.	"Right for Me" (performed by Eminem)	Mathers; Resto	Eminem; Resto^{[b]}	4:57
12.	"Detroit vs. Everybody" (performed by Eminem, Royce da 5'9", Big Sean, Danny Brown, Dej Loaf and Trick-Trick)	Mathers; Montgomery; Deja Trimble; Daniel Sewell; Sean Anderson; Patrick Baril; James Brown; Peter Beveridge; Andy James; J. Trotti	Statik Selektah; Eminem	5:57

European bonus track
No.	Title	Writer(s)	Producer(s)	Length
13.	"Till It's Gone" (performed by Yelawolf)	Atha; William "WLPWR" Washington; Mike Hartnett; Matt Hayes	WLPWR	4:35

Disc two (V)
No.	Title	Writer(s)	Producer(s)	Length
1.	"I Get Money" (performed by 50 Cent)	Curtis Jackson; Kirk Robinson	Apex	3:43
2.	"Purple Pills" (performed by D12)	Carlisle; DeShaun Holton; Johnson; Mathers; Moore; Porter; Jeff Bass	Eminem; Bass^{[b]}	5:04
3.	"Lose Yourself" (performed by Eminem)	Mathers; Bass; Resto	Eminem; Bass^{[b]}	5:20
4.	"Cry Now (Shady Remix)" (performed by Obie Trice, Kuniva, Bobby Creekwater, Cashis and Stat Quo)	Obie Trice; Dewitt Moore; Bryan Johnson; Joseph Scott; Don Robey; C. Louis; D. Campbell; Stanley Benton; Ramone Johnson; Carlisle; Antione Rogers	Witt & Pep	5:09
5.	"Let's Roll" (performed by Yelawolf featuring Kid Rock)	Atha; Jimmy Giannos; Dominic Jordan; Das Simmons; Jason Boyd	The Audibles; Mr. Pyro; Eminem^{[a]}	3:55
6.	"Hammer Dance" (performed by Slaughterhouse)	Montgomery; Budden; Ortiz; Wickliffe; Ana Orellana; Jonathan Davis; Reginald Arvizu; James Shaffer; David Silveria; Brian Welch	AraabMuzik; Eminem^{[b]}	4:05
7.	"P.I.M.P." (performed by 50 Cent)	Jackson; Porter	Mr. Porter	4:09
8.	"You Don't Know" (performed by Eminem, 50 Cent, Cashis and Lloyd Banks)	Mathers; Jackson; Christopher Lloyd; Ramone Johnson; Resto	Eminem; Resto^{[b]}	4:17
9.	"My Band" (performed by D12)	Porter; Moore; Holton; Carlisle; Rufus Johnson; Mathers; Resto; Steve King	Eminem; Resto^{[b]}	4:58
10.	"Wanna Know" (performed by Obie Trice)	Trice; William Jones; Dennis Webber; Haynie	Haynie	4:04
11.	"Wanksta" (performed by 50 Cent)	Jackson; John Freeman	John "J-Praize" Freeman	3:38
12.	"The Setup" (performed by Obie Trice featuring Nate Dogg)	Trice; Andre Young; Mike Elizondo; Nathaniel Hale	Dr. Dre; Mike Elizondo	3:13
13.	"In da Club" (performed by 50 Cent)	Jackson; Young; Elizondo	Dr. Dre; Elizondo^{[a]}	3:13
14.	"Fight Music" (performed by D12)	Carlisle; Holton; Rufus Johnson; Mathers; Moore; Porter; Young; Elizondo	Dr. Dre	4:21
15.	"Pop the Trunk" (performed by Yelawolf)	Atha; Washington	WLPWR	3:48

Best Buy bonus track
No.	Title	Writer(s)	Producer(s)	Length
16.	"Don't Front" (performed by Eminem featuring Buckshot)	Mathers; Kenyatta Blake	Katalyst	4:46

Bonus track
No.	Title	Writer(s)	Producer(s)	Length
17.	"Lose Yourself" (original demo version) (performed by Eminem)	Mathers; Bass; Resto	Eminem; Bass^{[b]}	3:00

Notes

- ^{^[a]} signifies a co-producer.
- ^{^[b]} signifies an additional producer.

Sample credits

- "Vegas" interpolates "Versace" written and performed by Migos
- "Fine Line" interpolates "Melody" by Luis Resto
- "Shady XV" contains elements of "My Kinda Lover", written and performed by Billy Squier. Contains elements of "Fack" and "The Monster" performed by Eminem.
- "Die Alone" interpolates "Just So You Don't Die Alone", written and performed by Luis Resto.
- "Down" contains elements of "Going Down", written by Don Nix and performed by Freddie King.
- "Twisted" contains elements of "Synthetic Substitution", written by Herb Rooney and performed by Melvin Bliss.
- "Right For Me" interpolates "Effigy" by Luis Resto
- "Detroit vs. Everybody" contains elements of "Funky Drummer", written and performed by James Brown, and "Static on the Frequency", written by Peter Beveridge, Andy James and Jon Trotti and performed by Peter Beveridge.
- "I Get Money" contains elements of "Top Billin'", written by Kirk Robinson and performed by Audio Two.
- "Cry Now" contains elements of "Blind Man", written by Joseph Scott and Don Robey, and performed by Bobby "Blue" Bland.
- "Hammer Dance" contains elements of "Falling Away from Me", written by Jonathan Davis, Reginald Arvizu, James Shaffer, David Silveria and Brian Welch, and performed by Korn.
- "Wanna Know" contains elements of "It Couldn't Be Me", written by William Jones and Dennis Webber and performed by Power of Zeus.

== Charts ==
=== Weekly charts ===
Chart (2014–15)	Peak position
Australian Compilation Albums (ARIA)	1
Austrian Albums (Ö3 Austria)	13
Belgian Albums (Ultratop Flanders)	26
Belgian Albums (Ultratop Wallonia)	68
Canadian Albums (Billboard)	1
Dutch Albums (Album Top 100)	75
Norwegian Albums (VG-lista)	18
French Albums (SNEP)	32
German Albums (Offizielle Top 100)	8
Italian Compilation Albums (FIMI)	3
Polish Albums (ZPAV)	38
Swiss Albums (Schweizer Hitparade)	7
UK Compilation Albums (Official Charts)	5
US Billboard 200	3
US Compilation Albums (Billboard)	1
US Top R&B/Hip-Hop Albums (Billboard)	1

=== Year-end charts ===
Chart (2015)	Position
Canadian Albums (Billboard)	32
US Billboard 200	104
US Top R&B/Hip-Hop Albums (Billboard)	13
US Rap Albums (Billboard)	10

== Certifications ==
Region	Certification	Certified units/sales
United Kingdom (BPI)	Silver	60,000^{*}
United States (RIAA)	Gold	250,000^{^}
^{*} Sales figures based on certification alone.^{^} Shipments figures based on certification alone.

== See also ==
- List of Billboard number-one R&B/Hip-Hop albums of 2014
- List of number-one albums of 2014 (Canada)
