= Whiskey in a Bottle =

Single by Yelawolf

from the album Love Story
- Released: February 17, 2015
- Recorded: Blackbird (Berry Hill, Tennessee)
- Genre: Hip-hop
- Length: 4:10
- Label: Shady; Interscope
- Songwriters: Michael Atha; William Washington; Antonio Cezar Albuquerque de Merces; Jorge Pereira da Neves
- Producer: WLPWR

Yelawolf singles chronology
"Till It's Gone" (2014)	"Whiskey in a Bottle" (2015)	"American You" (2015)

"Whiskey in a Bottle" is a song by American hip-hop recording artist Yelawolf, featured on his 2015 album Love Story. Written by Yelawolf and producer WLPWR, it contains elements of "Adormeceu", written by Cezar de Mercês (Antonio Cezar Albuquerque de Mercês) and Jorge Amiden (Jorge Pereira da Neves) from the Brazilian band O Terço. The song was released as the third single from the album on February 17, 2015.

== Recording and production ==
Like much of Love Story, "Whiskey in a Bottle" was recorded at Blackbird Studios in Nashville, Tennessee with mixing engineer Matthew Hayes and producer William "WLPWR" Washington, who also performed keyboards, pads, drums and programming on the song; Mike Hartnett performed guitar, and Rob "Stone" Cureton performed bass guitar.

== Music and lyrics ==
"Whiskey in a Bottle" is described by TheBoombox.com writer "Preezy" as "heavy on rock influences" and "one of the dopest beats of the year". Preezy praised the song's lyrics, particularly the hook which he describes as "catchy". Drew Millard of Spin magazine described the track as an "anti-industry song", while a writer for Empty Lighthouse Magazine identified it as an example of Yelawolf's strong ability to tell a story through his music.

== Music video ==
The music video for "Whiskey in a Bottle", directed by Michael Mihail, was filmed in Nashville, Tennessee, and released on March 2, 2015. Kevin Goddard of HotNewHipHop.com described the video as "thought-provoking", noting that it features Yelawolf "cruising the streets on his bike to hitting the studio with the band"; a writer for TheBoombox.com claimed that it gives the viewer "another glimpse into [Yelawolf's] 'Slumerican' lifestyle", describing it as "endearing".

== Critical reception ==
A writer for the website DJBooth praised "Whiskey in a Bottle", noting that it featured "rhymes that go straight to your head". Nicholas DG of HotNewHipHop.com was similarly positive, dubbing the track the point at which Yelawolf "seems to truly plant his feet into the ground, establishing what exactly Love Story is as an album.

Complex writer Chris Mench, however, slated "Whiskey in a Bottle", describing it as "messy" and "uneven".

== Personnel ==
Credits adapted from Love Story album notes.

- WLPWR – keyboards, pads, drums, programming, strings, production
- Mike Hartnett – guitar
- Rob "Stone" Cureton – bass
- Matthew Hayes – recording, mixing
- Randy Warnken – mixing assistance
