= Love Story (Yelawolf album) =

Studio album by Yelawolf
- Released: April 21, 2015
- Recorded: 2012–2015
- Studios: Blackbird (Berry Hill, Tennessee); Effigy (Ferndale, Michigan)
- Genres: Hip-hop; rap rock
- Length: 74:48
- Labels: Slumerican; Shady; Interscope
- Producers: Eminem; Malay; Track Bangas; WLPWR; Yelawolf

Yelawolf chronology
Trunk Muzik Returns (2013)	Love Story (2015)	Trial by Fire (2017)

Singles from Love Story
- 1. "Box Chevy V" Released: January 28, 2014; 2. "Till It's Gone" Released: September 16, 2014; 3. "Whiskey in a Bottle" Released: February 17, 2015; 4. "American You" Released: March 23, 2015; 5. "Best Friend" Released: April 14, 2015

Love Story is the third studio album by American rapper Yelawolf. It was released on April 21, 2015, by Slumerican, Shady Records, and Interscope Records. The album was described by Yelawolf as a more passionate album than his debut album. Recording process took place primarily in Nashville, Tennessee from 2012 to 2015. The production on the album was handled primarily by WLPWR, along with Eminem (who also served as the executive producer), Malay and Yelawolf himself. The album was influenced by aspects of country and rock.

Love Story was supported by five singles: "Box Chevy V", "Till It's Gone", "Whiskey in a Bottle", "American You" and "Best Friend" featuring Eminem. Love Story received generally positive reviews from critics, who praised the album's emotional feel as well as its ambition and production, but criticized its length. The album debuted at number three on the US Billboard 200, selling 51,000 copies in its first week.

== Background ==
In April 2012, Yelawolf said, "The focus of the album is the experience since Radioactive (2011) and just putting all that into a project." He also spoke about Love Story, and how it would be different compared to his debut effort Radioactive. He said, "With Radioactive, I gave up a lot of creative space, and like I predicted would happen, there were some records that didn't translate to my audience." Yelawolf also said this album contains more straight up passion in the songs and there is no guidelines for the album. He also said, "I'm telling the truth about a lot of things. This album is in line with it having a concept and a theme. This is what makes my music special and makes me want to keep making music. I try to be as honest as I can with everything I do."

== Release and promotion ==
Following the release of his debut album, Radioactive (2011), Yelawolf had been touring with Lil Wayne and Travis Barker on the I Am Music Tour. During the tour, he frequently collaborated with Barker, with whom he released an EP, Psycho White on November 13, 2012. In 2012, Yelawolf released his first collaborative album The Slumdon Bridge with Ed Sheeran, and later released his fifth mixtape, Heart of Dixie. On March 14, 2013, Yelawolf released his sixth mixtape Trunk Muzik Returns, containing ten tracks with guest appearances from Raekwon, Paul Wall, Killer Mike and ASAP Rocky. The mixtape was also entirely produced by his go-to producer WLPWR.

On October 31, 2013, Yelawolf released another mixtape, titled Black Fall, and this time it was produced entirely by Three 6 Mafia's DJ Paul. From November 14 to 23, 2013, Yelawolf was touring with Funk Volume's artist Hopsin, in promotion of Love Story, on the Fuck It Tour. The tour consists of primarily small, intimate venues in the West Coast of the United States. At first, the album was set to be released in 2012, however, that would be pushed to 2013, due to time constraints. In November 2013, Yelawolf confirmed to XXL, stating that the album would now be released in 2014.

== Singles ==
On January 3, 2014, Yelawolf announced that the album's lead single would be the fifth installment in the Box Chevy series, titled "Box Chevy V". It was released on January 28, 2014, and on the following day, it was made available for digital download. The song has a mellow groove, and the WLPWR made production features twinkling keys and guitar licks. The music video was filmed in Granville, Tennessee, and was released on April 4, 2014.

On September 16, 2014, the album's second single, "Till It's Gone", premiered on episode two of the seventh season of Sons of Anarchy, on the following day, it was released on the web. On October 14, 2014, the music video was released for "Till It's Gone". The song was produced by WLPWR.

The album's third single, "Whiskey in a Bottle", was released on February 17, 2015. The song was produced by WLPWR.

The album's fourth single, "American You", was released on March 23, 2015. The song was produced by Malay, with co-production by Eminem, while the additional production by Luis Resto.

The album's fifth single, "Best Friend", was released on April 14, 2015. The song features a guest appearance from American rapper Eminem, while the production was handled by WLPWR.

=== Other songs ===
The album's promotional single, titled "Honey Brown", was released for digital download on July 1, 2014. The song was produced by DJ Paul and Malay.

== Critical reception ==
Professional ratings
Aggregate scores
Source	Rating
Metacritic	64/100
Review scores
Source	Rating
AllMusic	3/5 stars
Complex	3/5 stars
HipHopDX	3.5/5
Pitchfork	4.9/10
RapReviews	6/10
Rolling Stone	3/5 stars
Spin	6/10
XXL	4/5

According to the review aggregator Metacritic, Love Story received "generally favorable reviews" based on a weighted average score of 64 out of 100 from 10 critic scores.

Ken Capobianco of The Boston Globe gave the album a positive review while calling the album "a striking improvement over 2011's messy, compromised "Radioactive"....if you scratch his songs' surfaces, you hear a smart, sensitive outsider searching for some solace." He would go on to praise the album for its "undeniable emotional pull". Renato Pagnani of Rolling Stone calling the album a "stronger embrace of his southern roots", while also adding that "Yelawolf's populist ambitions haven't gone away." Chris Mench of Complex saying "The album layers the trailer park swagger of his early work over rootsy country music instrumentals, and it's largely successful". He would go on to criticize the albums length by saying "If Love Story ended at its title song, it could have been a truly great project...its solid momentum really fizzles out in the last few songs, making for a disappointing finale of an otherwise solid effort".

Marcus Dowling of HipHopDX said: "On Love Story, the effort, creativity and ambition is more than there, and his tremendous talents as an emcee and clear artistic voice are very much present." He would go on to say the album is "disjointed but not jagged...the closer Yelawolf stays to his more organic-to-his-roots style of Southern rap, he excels." Miranda J. of XXL stating that Yelawolf is "in tune with his southern roots on Love Story ... there's a sense of self awareness and confidence that seems to have been missing before...He's fully aware of who exactly he wants to be in hip-hop: a proud, raw, unapologetically Southern MC, something the game’s been missing".

In a mixed review, Drew Millard of Spin stated: "Nobody else has tried to mash murder ballads, hardcore rap, bluegrass, backwoods country, and feather-light guitar-pop into one album, pretty much ever ... Your enjoyment of Love Story will directly correlate with the amount that you enjoy Yelawolf's singing, because boy howdy is there a lot of it here". Millard additionally criticized Yelawolf's lyrics, including his usage of "the word 'faggot' multiple times on the record, which, come on, guy. It's 2015!" He added: "[W]henever he's got space in a verse to fill, it seems the guy drops some sort of complaint about the music industry". In a mostly negative review, Jay Balfour of Pitchfork wrote: "Love Story is far too long to accomplish so little ... Yelawolf sounds like he's just going through the motions instead of actually covering ground".

== Commercial performance ==
In the United States, Love Story debuted at number three on the Billboard 200, with 58,000 album-equivalent units; it has sold 51,000 copies in its first week. It marked as Yelawolf's first top ten entry on the Billboard 200, his first number one album on the Top R&B/Hip-Hop Albums, and the best sales week of his career so far. The album dropped to number 15 in its second week, selling 14,000 copies. As of January 2016, the album has sold 119,000. On June 8, 2018, the album was certified gold by the Recording Industry Association of America (RIAA), for combined sales and album-equivalent units of over 500,000 units.

== Track listing ==
Love Story track listing
No.	Title	Writer(s)	Producer(s)	Length
1.	"Outer Space"	Michael Atha; William "WLPWR" Washington; Mike Hartnett; Matthew Hayes; Alan Block; Donn Hecht	WLPWR	4:01
2.	"Change"	Atha; James Ho	Malay	3:12
3.	"American You"	Atha; Ho; Marshall Mathers; Luis Resto	Malay; Eminem^{[a]}; Resto^{[b]}	3:32
4.	"Whiskey in a Bottle"	Atha; Washington; Antonio Cezar Albuquerque de Merces; Jorge Pereira da Neves	WLPWR	4:08
5.	"Ball and Chain"	Atha	Yelawolf; WLPWR^{[a]}	1:35
6.	"Till It's Gone"	Atha; Washington; Hartnett; Hayes	WLPWR	4:35
7.	"Devil in My Veins"	Atha; Caleb Owens; Joshua Winkler	Yelawolf	3:58
8.	"Best Friend" (featuring Eminem)	Atha; Washington; Mathers; Resto	WLPWR; Eminem^{[a]}	5:14
9.	"Empty Bottles"	Atha; Ho	Malay	4:17
10.	"Heartbreak"	Atha; Mathers; Mark Batson; Mike Elizondo	Eminem; Batson^{[b]}; Elizondo^{[b]}	4:25
11.	"Tennessee Love"	Atha; Washington; Hayes	WLPWR	4:54
12.	"Box Chevy V"	Atha; Washington; Hartnett; Hayes; Andre Young; Shawn Carter; Scott Storch	WLPWR	3:29
13.	"Love Story"	Atha; Washington; Hayes	WLPWR	4:13
14.	"Johnny Cash"	Atha; Jeffrey Smith; Dean Honer; Dean Manuel; Jarrod Gosling; Jim Reeves	Track Bangas	4:45
15.	"Have a Great Flight"	Atha; Ho	Malay	5:03
16.	"Sky's the Limit"	Atha; Washington; Hayes	WLPWR	4:28
17.	"Disappear"	Atha; Ho	Malay	5:14
18.	"Fiddle Me This"	Atha; Washington; Hayes	WLPWR	3:45
Total length:				74:48

Notes

- ^{^[a]} signifies a co-producer
- ^{^[b]} signifies an additional producer
- "Change" features vocals by Jessy Wilson
- "Devil in My Veins" features vocals by the McCrary Sisters

Sample credits

- "Outer Space" contains excerpts from "Walkin' After Midnight", written by Alan Block and Donn Hecht, performed by Patsy Cline.
- "Whiskey in a Bottle" contains elements of "Adormeceu", written by Antonio Cezar Albuquerque de Merces and Jorge Pereira da Neves.
- "Box Chevy V" contains elements of "Still D.R.E", written by Andre Young, Shawn Carter and Scott Storch, performed by Dr. Dre and Snoop Dogg.
- "Johnny Cash" contains excerpts from "Heaven", written by Dean Honer, Dean Manuel, Jarrod Gosling and Jim Reeves.
- "Fiddle Me This" contains elements of "Player's Ball", performed by Outkast.

== Personnel ==
=== Musical ===
- WLPWR – keyboards, pads, drums and programming (tracks 1, 4, 6, 8, 11–13, 16 and 18), strings (tracks 4, 6 and 11), hambone (track 11)
- Mike Hartnett – guitar (tracks 1, 4, 6, 12, 13 and 18), bass (tracks 6)
- Rob "Stone" Cureton – bass (tracks 1, 4, 5, 8, 16 and 18)
- Malay – guitar, bass, keyboards, programming and recording (tracks 2, 9, 15 and 17)
- DJ Klever – turntables (tracks 1, 12 and 18), percussion (track 7)
- Zach Casebolt – violin (track 7, 15 and 17), fiddle (track 18)
- Luis Resto – keyboards (tracks 3 and 8)
- Robby Turner – pedal steel guitar (tracks 11 and 18)
- Lindsey Smith-Trostle – cello (tracks 7, 15 and 17)
- Bones Owens – acoustic guitar and slide guitar (track 7)
- Geoff Firebaugh – upright bass (track 7)
- Mike Elizondo – guitar and keyboards (track 10)
- Mark Batson – keyboards (track 10)
- Lance Powlis – trumpet and talk box (track 13)

=== Technical ===
- Matthew Hayes – recording (tracks 1, 4–6, 8, 11–13, 16 and 18), mixing (tracks 1, 4–6, 9 and 11–18)
- Randy Warnken – mixing assistance (tracks 1, 2, 4–6, 9 and 11–18)
- Leland Elliott – recording (tracks 2, 3, 7, 9, 14, 15 and 17), mixing (track 7, 9, 14, 15 and 17)
- Mike Strange – recording and mixing (tracks 3, 8 and 10)
- Joe Strange – recording (tracks 3, 8 and 10)
- Eminem – mixing (tracks 3, 8 and 10)

== Charts ==
=== Weekly charts ===
Chart performance for Love Story
Chart (2015)	Peak position
Australian Albums (ARIA)	19
Austrian Albums (Ö3 Austria)	39
French Albums (SNEP)	227
German Albums (Offizielle Top 100)	51
Italian Albums (FIMI)	65
New Zealand Albums (RMNZ)	18
Swiss Albums (Schweizer Hitparade)	13
UK Albums (Official Charts)	25
US Billboard 200	3
US Top R&B/Hip-Hop Albums (Billboard)	1
US Top Rap Albums (Billboard)	1

=== Year-end charts ===
2015 year-end chart performance for Love Story
Chart (2015)	Position
US Top R&B/Hip-Hop Albums (Billboard)	27

== Certifications ==
Certifications for Love Story
Region	Certification	Certified units/sales
New Zealand (RMNZ)	Platinum	15,000^{‡}
United States (RIAA)	Gold	500,000^{‡}
^{‡} Sales+streaming figures based on certification alone.
