= Till It's Gone =

Single by Yelawolf

from the album Shady XV and Love Story
- Released: September 16, 2014
- Recorded: Blackbird (Berry Hill, Tennessee)
- Genre: Alternative hip-hop; country rap
- Length: 4:35
- Label: Shady; Interscope
- Songwriters: Michael Atha; William Washington; Michael Hartnett; Matthew Hayes
- Producer: WLPWR

Yelawolf singles chronology
"Honey Brown" (2014)	"Till It's Gone" (2014)	"Whiskey in a Bottle" (2015)

"Till It's Gone" is a song by American hip-hop recording artist Yelawolf, featured on his 2015 album Love Story. Written by Yelawolf, producer WLPWR, guitarist Mike Hartnett and mixing engineer Matthew Hayes, it was originally featured on some versions of the 2014 Shady Records compilation Shady XV. The song was released as the second single from both albums on September 16, 2014.

== Recording and production ==
Like much of Love Story, "Till It's Gone" was recorded at Blackbird Studios in Nashville, Tennessee with mixing engineer Matthew Hayes and producer William "WLPWR" Washington, who also performed keyboards, pads, drums, programming and strings on the song; Mike Hartnett performed guitar and bass guitar. The song originated as an acoustic guitar riff, which was then looped and used as the backing for lyrics which were written "in a couple hours". Due to its "dark and swampy" tone, the track was originally known as "The Swampy Record".

== Promotion and release ==
On September 16, 2014, "Till It's Gone" was featured on the second episode of the seventh season of American crime drama television series Sons of Anarchy, an inclusion which Yelawolf described as a "perfect fit". Speaking about the partnership, Yelawolf has described it as "a big deal" and "one of those moments where the timing was really really good". The single was released on iTunes the same night.

In January 2015, Yelawolf performed an acoustic version of the track for radio network Sirius XM with Travis Barker, Bones Owens and DJ Klever. The live performance was recorded backstage at the Hollywood House of Blues, which Yelawolf describes as the four simply "jamming ... chillin'".

== In pop culture ==
- The song appeared in the trailers for the film Black Mass and video game Call of Duty: Black Ops III.
- The Dan Heath remix appeared on the official soundtrack for WWE 2K16.
- The song was featured in season 7 of the American crime drama television series Sons of Anarchy.
- The song was sampled by LD Entertainment in the production opening credits for the film Jackie.
- Sidney Mecham was listening to this song during a road rage incident when he drove through the Grand Floral Parade in Northeast Portland on June 10, 2023.

== Music and lyrics ==
Speaking about the lyrical themes on display in "Till It's Gone", Yelawolf has described the song as "very aggressive" and "very dark", and notes that "It’s juxtaposed with this melody and the hook that gives it the power". About the music, he has described the beat as "dope, swampy, alligator, snake-infested, gangrene, [and] dark". PopMatters writer Charles Pitter described the song as "melodically acoustic" in his review of Shady XV.

Yelawolf has claimed that the song was "the first song on the album that ... tied the project together and made the perfect sense", noting that its guitar-based style meant it received airplay on alternative rock, country and hip-hop radio stations simultaneously. The song has been compared stylistically to Trunk Muzik 0-60 single "Pop the Trunk".

== Music video ==
The music video for "Till It's Gone" was released on October 14, 2014. Yelawolf claimed that the music video, filmed in New Orleans, was "expensive as hell", explaining that "The imagery and the rawness of the record had to match".

== Critical reception ==
Media response to "Till It's Gone" was generally favorable. Reviewing Shady XV for RapReviews.com, Jesal Padania described "Till It's Gone" as "a stunning tour de force from a truly unique artist". In his review of Love Story, Drew Millard of Spin magazine named the track as a highlight of the album, claiming that it "[sounds] like a skiffle song they’d play after somebody died on Nashville" and describing it as evidence that Yelawolf is "one of the best, most imaginative rappers rapping". Chris Mench of Complex magazine also praised "Till It's Gone", noting its "punchy, personal verses over twanging guitars".

== Charts ==
Chart (2014–2015)	Peak position
Australia (ARIA)	70
Canada (Canadian Hot 100)	67
Sweden (Sverigetopplistan)	88
US Bubbling Under Hot 100 (Billboard)	7
US Alternative Airplay (Billboard)	25
US Hot R&B/Hip-Hop Songs (Billboard)	35
US Hot Rap Songs (Billboard)	25

== Certifications ==
Region	Certification	Certified units/sales
Denmark (IFPI Danmark)	Gold	45,000^{‡}
New Zealand (RMNZ)	Platinum	30,000^{‡}
Sweden (GLF)	Platinum	40,000^{‡}
United States (RIAA)	Platinum	1,000,000^{‡}
^{‡} Sales+streaming figures based on certification alone.

== Personnel ==
Credits adapted from Love Story album notes.

- WLPWR – keyboards, pads, drums, programming, strings, production
- Mike Hartnett – guitar, bass
- Matthew Hayes – recording, mixing
- Randy Warnken – mixing assistance
