= Trunk Muzik Returns =

Mixtape by Yelawolf
- Released: March 14, 2013
- Recorded: 2012–13; Nashville, Tennessee
- Genre: Alternative hip-hop; rap rock
- Label: Slumerican; Shady
- Producer: WLPWR

Yelawolf chronology
Psycho White (2012)	Trunk Muzik Returns (2013)	Love Story (2015)

Singles from Trunk Muzik Returns
- 1. "Way Out" Released: February 5, 2013; 2. "F.A.S.T Ride" Released: February 26, 2013; 3. "Gangsta" Released: March 12, 2013

Trunk Muzik Returns is the sixth official mixtape by American rapper Yelawolf. The mixtape was released as a free digital download on March 14, 2013 on his Slumerican website and other mixtape hosting websites. It features production solely by WLPWR of SupaHotBeats, and guest appearances by Paul Wall, A$AP Rocky, Big Henry, Raekwon and Killer Mike.

The mixtape was promoted with three promotional singles, "Way Out", "Gangsta" featuring A$AP Rocky and Big Henry, and "F.A.S.T Ride", which also had music videos released.

== Background ==
During an interview with DJ Skee, he revealed that a sequel to his 2010 mixtape Trunk Muzik, titled Trunk Muzik Returns, and it would be released for August 2012, after "the dust settles on the Heart of Dixie" but since then it was delayed. In December 2012, Yelawolf addressed the status of all of his projects in an interview. Yelawolf stated that Trunk Muzik Returns would hopefully be released for February 2013.

On February 5, Yelawolf released the first song from Trunk Muzik Returns with "Way Out" and announced a release date of March 14, 2013 for the mixtape. On February 26, Yelawolf released "F.A.S.T Ride", and on March 12, "Gangsta" was released, featuring fellow rappers A$AP Rocky and Big Henry. The music video for "Hustle" with Paul Wall was released on October 15, 2013.

== Critical reception ==
Professional ratings
Review scores
Source	Rating
Exclaim!	6/10
XXL	4/5 (XL)

Trunk Muzik Returns was met with generally positive reviews from music critics, with most praising it as an improvement from his major label debut album Radioactive. Vice named the mixtape "Mixtape of the Month" saying, "Trunk Muzik Returns may very well be the best thing he's ever done. It's concise, shows an astonishing lyrical growth on Yela's part, and most importantly sounds like very little else out there." NMB of XXL gave the mixtape a positive review saying, "Trunk Muzik Returns is a return to the form that won his fans over. Unlike some of the uncomfortable attempts at pop songs found on Radioactive, Yelawolf is raw and uncut here, which has always been the basis of his appeal."

Peter Marrack of Exclaim! gave the mixtape a six out of ten saying, "Technically, his bars sound sharp as ever; even to a critical listener the double-timed, crisp-as-a-typewriter flows sail over your head...Trunk Muzik Returns is badass, amped-up music to ride to — songs that make that suburban town car cringe when you pull up next to it at the light." David Lee of HipHopDX gave it a mixed review saying, It sounds cool, but it's bogged down by so many missed opportunities. Check out "Catfish Billy," "Gangsta," or any of the hooks on this project to see why you shouldn’t give up on Yelawolf. He's a true artist and he should have room to experiment, but this just wasn't it."

On December 24, 2013, XXL ranked it at number 25 on their list of the best mixtapes of 2013. They commented saying, "Re-exploring the sound that made him a household name, Trunk Muzik Returns find him doing lyrical acrobatics over superb production by3 Will Power of SupaHotBeats. He holds his own with renowned spitters such as Raekwon and Killer Mike, while giving us a taste of his country roots in songs like “Tennessee Love.” Technically, Yela kills it in both flow and rhyme schemes, indicating that his next LP should be worth the wait."

== Track listing ==
- All tracks produced by WLPWR of SupaHotBeats.

No.	Title	Length
1.	"Firestarter"	4:01
2.	"Way Out"	4:02
3.	"F.A.S.T Ride"	5:08
4.	"Box Chevy Pt. 4"	5:11
5.	"Hustle" (featuring Paul Wall)	3:51
6.	"Catfish Billy"	4:22
7.	"Gangsta" (featuring A$AP Rocky and Big Henry)	4:49
8.	"Rhyme Room" (featuring Raekwon and Killer Mike)	4:13
9.	"Fame"	4:21
10.	"Tennessee Love"	4:57

== Personnel ==
- Yelawolf – performer
- Paul Wall – performer
- ASAP Rocky – performer
- Big Henry – performer
- Raekwon – performer
- Killer Mike – performer
- SupaHotBeats – producer
- WLPWR – producer
- Matthew Hayes – mixing
- Irvin Johnson – mastering
- Robby Turner – guitar
- Smith Trustle – cello
- Mikey Belluso – bass, guitar
- Jeremy "J-Dot" Jones – management
- Joshua Dick – booking
