= WLPWR =

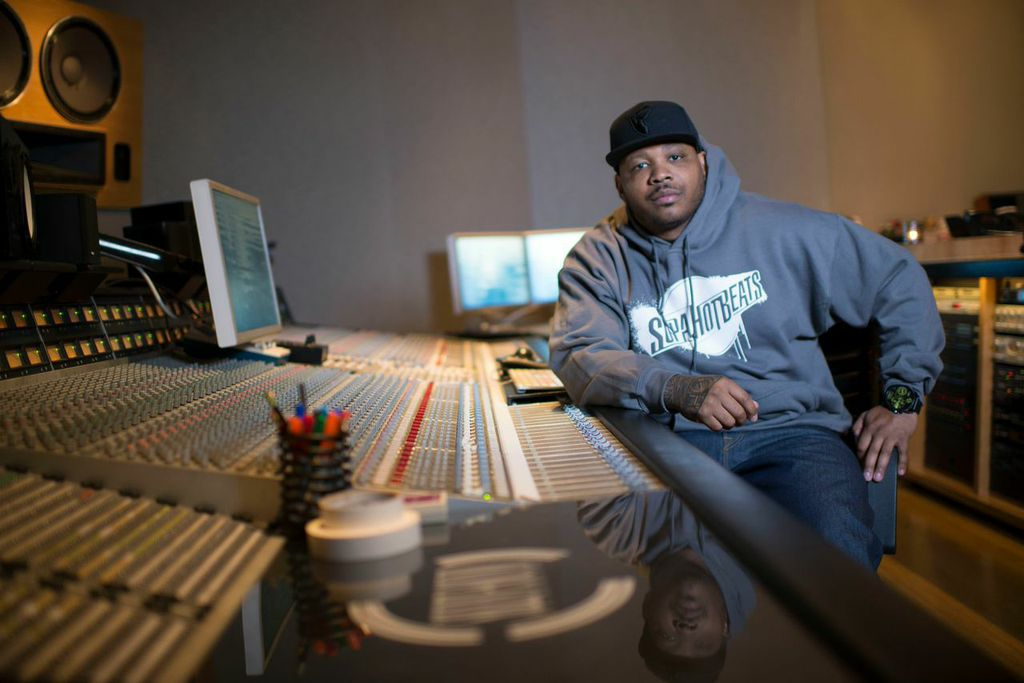

Background information
- Origin: Columbia, South Carolina, United States
- Genres: Hip hop; hip hop soul; country rap; R&B; pop
- Occupation: Music producer
- Instruments: DAW; Logic Pro
- Years active: 1997–present
- Label: BNDWTH
- Website: BNDWTH.net

William Washington, known professionally as WLPWR (pronounced Willpower) is a musician and music producer who founded SupaHotBeats in 2002, as well as BNDWTH, a record label and production studio based out of Atlanta founded by Washington in 2018.

== Early career ==
Will began producing music as early as 1997 in while living in Columbia, SC. It was in the Carolinas that WLPWR first began to make a name for himself while producing for nearly every urban artist on the local independent scene. While working in a compound of music producers, and audio engineers, WLPWR worked with producer K-Def who mentored Will and taught him how to produce hip hop on Logic Pro. In an era before the internet, he was selling music out of his trunk. In 2001 WLPWR worked as a producer for Sylvia Robinson. In these early years of his career he met Yelawolf in the lobby of Sugar Hill Records, and they formed an instant connection. During this time, his label SupaHotBeats was established in Columbia, SC. Through this label, Will started The Starving Artist Showcase, a music contest which later laid the foundation for his television show The Independent Music Review. The show aired on WACH Fox 57 in Columbia. In 2005 he made the decision to move his business to Atlanta, GA where the music industry was more accessible. In 2007, Will reconnected with Yelawolf to work on his studio album Fearin' and Loathin' in Smalltown, U.S.A. for Columbia Records.

== 2010 to 2011 ==
In 2009, Will produced Yelawolf's mixtape "Trunk Muzik" which was later re-released by Interscope Records as Trunk Muzik 0-60 Trunk Muzik launched Will further into his career as a hip-hop producer. Though he continued to work with Yelawolf on his debut for Shady Records, Will and Yelawolf never became exclusive to each other in terms of their work, despite their chemistry.

== 2013 to 2015 ==
A few years after the release of the original Trunk Muzik, Will and Yelawolf returned to the studio and released Trunk Muzik Returns, which was another success. Building on this momentum, his most recent work is another album he did with Yelawolf titled Love Story which debuted at number 3 on the Billboard Chart and peaked on the Billboard Chart (Hip Hop).

== Production style ==
Will's production style attracted many other artists, including Rittz, Wiz Khalifa, Tech N9ne and Eminem. The way he describes his production style is a unique one-on-one collaboration with each different artist, tailoring his beats and sounds to the artist's personal style and working off the vibe they create together in the studio. When he is not working with other artists he continues to create music for himself as a musician, and helps other producers learn the business.

== FreeGame Podcast ==
In 2016 Wlpwr started as podcast titled "The FreeGame Producers Podcast" in which he interviews music producers and other music industry professionals about the business of making music. Some of his guests included notable musicians such as Big K.R.I.T., !llmind, Focus..., Dj Toomp Jazze Pha and more. In 2019 the podcast partnered with AirBit and took the podcast to YouTube for viewers to watch the recorded interviews.

== Discography ==
Album	Artist	Song	Credits	Label (year)
The Murder (album)	Boondox	Throw Away (ft. Jamie Madrox)	Producer writer	Majik Ninja Entertainment (2017)
Love Story (Album)	Yelawolf	"Outer Space"; "Whiskey in a Bottle"; "Ball And Chain"; "Till It's Gone"; "Best Friend" (ft. Eminem); "Tennessee Love"; "Box Chevy V"; "Love Story"; "Sky's The Limit"; "Fiddle Me This"	Producer writer	Shady; Interscope (2015)
Ryse of the Fienix (Album)	RyattFeinix	"Down"; "I aint complaining"; "808"; "Rebound"; "Suicide" (ft. Rittz); "Together" (ft. Gangsta Boo); "Give and take"; "Tattoo Love"; "Roll Face"; "Don't be shy" (ft. Dizzy Wright); "Money Talk"; "Throw away the key"; "Regrettably Yours"; "Ever Cry"; "No Worries" (ft. Bubba Sparxxx)	Producer writer	SupaHotBeats (2014)
Shady XV(Compilation)	Yelawolf	"Pop the Trunk"	Producer writer	Shady; Interscope (2014)
Next To Nothing (Album)	Rittz	"Profit" (ft. Yelawolf & Shawty Fatt)	Producer writer	Strange Music (2014)
Witch (EP)	Gangsta Boo & La Chat	"Witches Brew"	Producer writer	Phixieous Entertainment (2014)
Trunk Muzik Returns (Mixtape)	Yelawolf	"Firestarter"; "Way Out"; "F.A.S.T Ride"; "Box Chevy Pt. 4"; "Hustle" (ft. Paul Wall); "Catfish Billy"; "Gangsta" (ft. Big Henry; "Rhyme Room" (ft. Killer Mike, Raekwon); "Fame"; "Tennessee Love"	Producer writer	Slumerican; Shady (2013)
The War Within (Album)	Wreckonize	"Easy Money" (ft. Bun B); "Floating Away"	Producer writer	Strange Music (2013)
The Golden Age (Mixtape)	Dizzy Wright	"Cant Stop, Wont Stop"	Producer writer	Funk Volume (2013)
Gang Land (Mixtape)	Chevy Woods	"Still Surviving"	Producer writer	Taylor Gang Records (2012)
Rollin' Stone (Album)	Stevie Stone	"Dollar General"	Producer writer	Ruthless Records; Strange Music (2012)
SpeakHer (Mixtape)	Nikkiya	"Titanic"; "Favorite Things"; "Love Machine"; "Cheater"; "When I was high"; "Y.O.Y"; "In the game" (ft. MC Lyte); "I like what you're doing"; "Nobody but me"; "Wish"; "Speaker Sex" (ft. Yelawolf)	Producer writer	SupaHotBeats (2011)
Rolling Papers; Deluxe Version (Album)	Wiz Khalifa	"Middle of you" ft. Chevy Woods, Nikkiya, and MDMA	Producer writer	Rostrum Records; Atlantic Records (2011)
Radioactive (Album)	Yelawolf	"Radioactive Introduction"; "Growin' Up in the Gutter"; "Throw It Up" (ft. Eminem, Gangsta Boo); "The Hardest Love Song in the World"; "Everything I Love The Most"; "The Last Song"; "Slumerican Shitizen" (ft. Killer Mike)	Producer writer	Shady; DGC; Interscope; Ghet-o-vision (2011)
White Jesus (Mixtape)	Rittz	"Dixxxie Cup"	Producer writer	Slumerican Records (2011)
All6's and 7's (Album)	Tech N9ne	"Delusional"	Producer writer	Strange Music (2011)
Trunk Muzik 0-60 (Album)	Yelawolf	"Get the F*** Up"; "Thats What we on now"; "I just wanna party" (ft. Gucci Mane); "Marijuana"; "Trunk muzik"; "Good to go" (ft. Bun B); "Pop the trunk"; "Box Chevy pt.3" (ft. Rittz); "Love is not enough"	Producer writer	Shady; DGC; Interscope; Ghet-o-vision (2010)
Trunk Muzik (Mixtape)	Yelawolf	"Trunk muzik"; "Good to go" (ft. Bun B); "Pop the trunk"; "Box Chevy pt.3" (ft. Rittz); "F.U"; "Lick the cat" (ft. Diamond); "Speak her sex" (ft. Nikkiya); "In this club"; "Love is not enough"	Producer writer	Self released (2010)
