= Trunk Muzik 3 =

Studio album by Yelawolf
- Released: March 29, 2019
- Recorded: 2018–2019
- Studio: Blackbird Studio (Nashville, Tennessee)
- Genre: Southern hip-hop; rap rock
- Length: 56:02
- Label: Slumerican; Shady; Interscope
- Producer: Yelawolf; WLPWR; DJ Paul; Jim Jonsin; BandPlay; Locke; Ms Madli; Michael Burman; Robert Dante

Yelawolf chronology
Trial by Fire (2017)	Trunk Muzik 3 (2019)	Ghetto Cowboy (2019)

Singles from Trunk Muzik 3
- 1. "TM3" Released: March 15, 2019; 2. "Catfish Billy 2" Released: March 22, 2019

Professional ratings
Review scores
Source	Rating
AllMusic	3/5 stars
HipHopDX	3.6/5
laut.de	4/5 stars

Trunk Muzik 3 is the fifth studio album by American rapper Yelawolf, released on March 29, 2019. It is his final album under Eminem's imprint Shady Records, and was released in conjunction with Interscope Records and Yelawolf's own label Slumerican. The album marks a return to an emphasis on the southern hip-hop sound that was predominant in Yelawolf's music at the start of the decade, a contrast to the country-folk and hip-hop fusions of his previous two albums. While the album is titled as the third in the Trunk Muzik series, it is, technically, the fourth, following his 2009 mixtape Trunk Muzik, its subsequent 2010 reissue Trunk Muzik 0-60, and 2013's Trunk Muzik Returns.

Sessions for the album began in January 2018, following the release Yelawolf's fourth album Trial by Fire, with long-time producer and collaborator WLPWR. This marks their first production collaboration on one of Yelawolf's studio albums since the release of 2015's Love Story.

The album also features production from DJ Paul, Jim Jonsin, BandPlay and Ms Madli, and collaborations from Rittz, DJ Paul, Machine Gun Kelly, Caskey, Doobie, Shawty Fatt, Big Henri, MopTop, Cub da CookUpBoss and DJ Klever.

== Background ==
In 2009, Yelawolf collaborated with producer WLPWR on Trunk Muzik, which was released to much acclaim and garnered him a strong following in the hip-hop community. The release of the mixtape led to a record contract with Interscope Records, and after hearing the mixtape, rapper Eminem signed Yelawolf to his label Shady Records. After the release of 2011's Radioactive, Yelawolf released a mixtape in 2013 titled Trunk Muzik Returns, which served as a sequel the original Trunk Muzik. The mixtape also showcases a stylistic departure for Yelawolf, one that incorporates elements of country folk and southern rock into hip-hop, a sound that would be prevalent on his following studio albums, Love Story (2015) and Trial By Fire (2017). Yelawolf described this departure from orthodox hip-hop as "artistically empowering" and "unconventional". In mid-2017, while taking a short hiatus from the music industry, Yelawolf posted a video of himself on Instagram with the caption "TM3", which led to speculation that he might have begun work on a third installment in the Trunk Muzik series. In January 2018, Yelawolf officially announced production of Trunk Muzik 3 had begun in Nashville, Tennessee with WLPWR once again producing.

Yelawolf assembled a band, promptly called the "Sons of Sheila" (a reference to Yelawolf's mother's name) in mid-2018 and launched a 25-date tour in support of the album titled the "Trunk Muzik III" tour. During a show in Denver, Colorado, Yelawolf announced that Trunk Muzik 3 would be his final album under Shady Records. "Five fuckin' albums on Shady Records. I feel blessed for that. Make some noise for Marshall Mathers!"

During the first week of 2019, Yelawolf released a promotional freestyle titled "Get Buck", which would be indicative to the general sound of the album. The following week, he released "Pinto Bean" and announced that he would be releasing a weekly freestyle until the release of Trunk Muzik 3. A total of 8 freestyles have currently been released, including "Jesco White", "Billy Goat", "Skallywag", "Elvis Messy", "Mtn. Dew Mouth" and "Bloody Sunday", the latter of which garnered controversy after it featured lines targeting rappers G-Eazy and Post Malone.

The cover art, tracklist and release date were revealed on March 14 (coincidentally on the sixth anniversary of the release of Trunk Muzik Returns), which scheduled the album for release on March 29, 2019.

== Recording ==
Yelawolf stated in regards to WLPWR, "Most don't realize we've been making music for 16 years. This is growth. The evolution of two creatives, a friendship, and the Trunk Muzik brand, it's coming". In an interview, WLPWR stated "I’m super excited … I think this is an amazing time for me in my career. Yela’s been doing some extremely good things in his own career. We took a little break from working with each other after Love Story. I produced a great majority of the Love Story album … I think the next step for him was to explore producing on his own. And so recently, he hit me up and we just … Like brothers, we just decided to go ahead and do it without hesitation. I’m telling you, man, it’s really incredible. People should be really excited to hear this stuff. It’s really creative and really, really … We’re pushing the envelope.” He went on to speak on Yelawolf's production skills and their dynamic in the studio by stating “He’s leaning on me to some extent, but a lot of people don’t realize that he’s really involved with the production process. He is a producer himself. But it’s the same as we’ve always done. He just kind of lets me live in the producer world, and he lives in the artist world. But it would be naïve of me to say he has nothing to do with the production side of it because he certainly does. He’s very particular about his cadences. He’s very particular about what type of sounds will inspire him. So, I’ll probably get to wear the production hat in the instance. However, I wouldn’t dare say production credit-wise it’s just all me".

In January 2019, Yelawolf stated "The album is done, the music is done. We just added a song last week, that's the reason why I take my time with releasing albums, and projects, because you never really know what's going to happen or what might inspire you. [If] you put an album out and then you go in the studio and record a banger, then you're like "fuck man, I wish I would have waited and could have put that on the album." Yelawolf also spoke on the production featured on the album. "DJ Paul is all over Trunk Muzik 3. Jim Jonsin, WLPWR, all the usual suspects. All my old homies, we just went back and did what we do."

== Singles ==
On March 13, 2019, Yelawolf announced that the album's lead single would also be the album's title-track, titled "TM3". It was released on March 15, 2019 and made available for digital download. The song was produced by WLPWR and features scratches by DJ Klever. On March 20, 2019, Yelawolf announced that the album's second single would be the sequel to "Catfish Billy" from his 2013 mixtape Trunk Muzik Returns, titled "Catfish Billy 2". It was released on March 22, 2019 and made available for digital download. The song was produced by WLPWR.

== Commercial performance ==
Trunk Muzik 3 debuted at number 28 on the US Billboard 200.

== Track listing ==
No.	Title	Writer(s)	Producer(s)	Length
1.	"TM3"	Michael Atha; William Washington; Josh Winkler	WLPWR	3:09
2.	"Catfish Billy 2"	Atha; Washington	WLPWR	3:18
3.	"Rowdy" (featuring Machine Gun Kelly & DJ Paul)	Atha; Richard Colson Baker; Paul Duane Beauregard	DJ Paul	4:28
4.	"Special Kind of Bad"	Atha; Jim Jonsin; James Scheffer; Gannin Arnold	Jim Jonsin	3:46
5.	"Like I Love You"	Atha; Scheffer; Michael Burman; Robert Dante	Jim Jonsin; Michael Burman; Robert Dante	3:44
6.	"Drugs"	Atha; Washington	WLPWR	4:30
7.	"Trailer Park Hollywood"	Atha; Beauregard	DJ Paul	3:57
8.	"No Such Thing as Free" (featuring Caskey & Doobie)	Atha; Brandon Caskey; Eric Williams	Locke	4:08
9.	"We Slum" (featuring Shawty Fatt & Big Henry)	Atha; Washington; Jerrico Horton; Jonathan Henry	WLPWR	4:10
10.	"Box Chevy 6" (featuring Rittz & DJ Paul)	Atha; Beauregard; Jonathan McCollum; Chad Lamont Butler; Winkler	DJ Paul	4:57
11.	"All the Way Up" (featuring MopTop & Cub da CookUpBoss)	Atha	BandPlay	4:18
12.	"Over Again"	Atha; Winkler	DJ Klever	2:49
13.	"Addiction"	Atha; Washington; Madli Kents	WLPWR; Ms Madli	3:58
14.	"Over Here"	Atha; Washington	WLPWR	4:50
Total length:				56:02

Notes

- "TM3" features additional vocals from Misha Fair and featuring DJ Klever.
- "We Slum" features vocals from Nikkiya.
- "Over Again" features DJ Klever.

Sample credits

- "TM3" contains elements and samples of "Trunk Muzik", written by Michael Wayne Atha and William Washington.
- "Box Chevy 6" contains elements from "International Player's Anthem", performed by UGK and Outkast.

== Charts ==
Chart (2019)	Peak position
Australian Albums (ARIA)	34
Canadian Albums (Billboard)	24
New Zealand Albums (RMNZ)	19
Swiss Albums (Schweizer Hitparade)	60
US Billboard 200	28
US Top R&B/Hip-Hop Albums (Billboard)	17
