= I Just Wanna Party =

Single by Yelawolf featuring Gucci Mane

from the album Trunk Muzik 0-60
- Released: August 12, 2010
- Recorded: S-Line Studios (Atlanta, Georgia)
- Genre: Trap; Southern hip-hop
- Length: 5:11
- Label: Ghet-O-Vision; DGC; Interscope
- Songwriters: M. Wayne Atha; Radric Davis; Kawan Prather; William Washington
- Producer: WillPower

Yelawolf singles chronology
"Pop the Trunk" (2010)	"I Just Wanna Party" (2010)	"Daddy's Lambo" (2010)

"I Just Wanna Party" is the second single of American rapper Yelawolf's album Trunk Muzik 0-60. The track features fellow Southern rapper Gucci Mane and production from WillPower, it was written by Michael Wayne Atha, Radric Davis, Kawan Prather, and William Washington. The song was released as a single on August 12, 2010. The song debuted and peaked at number 109 on the Hot R&B/Hip-Hop Songs, becoming Yelawolf's highest-charting song at that time.

== Track listing ==
Digital download

1. "I Just Wanna Party" (featuring Gucci Mane) – 5:11

== Music video ==
The music video was filmed in Gadsden, Alabama and directed by Motion Family. It features cameo appearances by fellow rappers Shawty Fatt, Rittz, Big Boi and Jackie Chain. The video shows both Yelawolf and Gucci Mane in a house at a party, scenes of Yelawolf in the house front drinking while everyone is unconscious drunk, it ends with a drunk Yelawolf grabbing a keg of beer and returning to the house.

== Credits and personnel ==
- Songwriter – Michael Wayne Atha, William Washington, Radric Davis, Kawan Prather
- Production – WillPower

== Charts ==
Chart (2011)	Peak position
US Billboard Hot R&B/Hip-Hop Songs	109
