= Hard White (Up in the Club) =

2011 single by Yelawolf

"Hard White (Up In the Club)"

Single by Yelawolf featuring Lil Jon

from the album Radioactive
- Released: August 8, 2011
- Recorded: PatchWerk Recording Studios (Atlanta, Georgia)
- Genre: Hip hop
- Length: 3:24
- Label: Shady; Ghet-O-Vision, DGC; Interscope
- Songwriters: Michael Wayne Atha; Alex Cartagena; Jonathan Smith; Lowell Grant; Michael Jackson
- Producer: Tha Hydrox

Yelawolf singles chronology
"Worldwide Choppers" (2011)	"Hard White (Up In the Club)" (2011)	"Let's Roll" (2011)

Lil Jon singles chronology
"Turbulence" (2011)	"Hard White (Up in the Club)" (2011)	"Turn Down for What" (2013)

"Hard White (Up In the Club)" is the lead single from Yelawolf's debut studio album Radioactive. The song features a chorus by fellow rapper Lil Jon. The song was leaked just days before the official release. Though it was released officially on August 8, 2011 the song was available on Yelawolf's official website.

== Background ==
The first single of Radioactive was supposed to be "Gangsta of Love" which featured an outro speech by Cyhi Da Prynce and production from Jim Jonsin, but was not officially released by Yelawolf because it was leaked. On July 7, Yelawolf announced that the song would not make the final cut on the album.

The song was recorded at PatchWerk Recording Studios in Atlanta, Georgia, with Kawan "KP" Prather and Yelawolf's manager Jeremy "J Dot" Jones, production was handled by Orlando, Florida based production team Tha Hydrox, while the chorus features vocals by rapper Lil Jon.

The music video for the song was directed by Motion Family, filmed in Atlanta, Georgia at 1260 Custer Avenue during August 26. On September 20 it was released through VEVO. Fellow rappers Rittz, Shawty Fatt and Trouble make cameo appearances in the music video.

The official remix features T.I. and fellow Shady Records label mates Slaughterhouse.

== Track listing ==
- Digital Download
1. "Hard White (Up In the Club)" (featuring Lil Jon) – 3:24
- Remix
1. "Hard White (Remix)" (featuring T.I. and Slaughterhouse) – 4:51

== Credits and personnel ==
Songwriting credits and producers per Allmusic.

- Songwriter – Michael Wayne Atha, Alex Cartagena, Jonathan Smith, Lowell Grant, Michael Jackson
- Production – Tha Hydrox

== Charts ==
Chart (2012)	Peak position
US Bubbling Under R&B/Hip-Hop Singles (Billboard)	14
