= Homeward Bound =

Homeward Bound may refer to:

== Film and television ==
=== Film ===
- Homeward Bound (1923 film), an American silent film directed by Ralph Ince
- Homeward Bound (1980 film), a TV film starring Moosie Drier
- Homeward Bound: The Incredible Journey, a 1993 American remake of the 1963 film The Incredible Journey
- Homeward Bound (2002 film), a TV film featuring Jake Richardson

=== Television ===
==== Series ====
- Homeward Bound (Australian TV series), a 1958 variety entertainment series
- Homeward Bound (New Zealand TV series), a 1992 soap opera

==== Episodes ====
- "Homeward Bound" (Girls), a 2016 episode
- "Homeward Bound" (Private Practice), a 2009 episode
- "Homeward Bound" (Roseanne), a 1993 episode
- "Homeward Bound!", a 2026 episode of the animated web series Battle for Dream Island

== Literature ==
- Homeward Bound, an 1838 novel by James Fenimore Cooper
- "Homeward Bound", the sixth and final part of Stories of Other Worlds, a 1900 serial by George Griffith
- Homeward Bound, a 1975 novel by Eleanor Farnes
- Homeward Bound, a 1980 novel by Rosemary Timperley
- Homeward Bound, a 1988 Deathlands novel by Laurence James (as James Axler)
- Homeward Bound (play), a 1991 play by Elliott Hayes
- Homeward Bound (Turtledove novel), a 2004 Worldwar series novel by Harry Turtledove

== Music ==
- Homeward Bound, a musical project of Australian hip hop artist Jimblah

=== Albums ===
- Homeward Bound (album), by Harry Belafonte, 1970
- Homeward Bound, by Bryn Terfel, 2013
- Homeward Bound, by Sabina Ddumba, 2016

=== Songs ===
- "Homeward Bound" (1917 song), composed by George W. Meyer
- "Homeward Bound" (Simon & Garfunkel song), 1966
- "Homeward Bound", by Dropkick Murphys from The Gang's All Here, 1999
- "Homeward Bound", written by Irving Berlin
- "Homeward Bound", by Yelawolf on Mud Mouth
- "Homeward Bound", composed by Marta Keen Thompson

== Other uses ==
- Homeward Bound (horse) (1961–>1982), a British Thoroughbred racehorse
- Homeward Bound (organization), an Australia-based leadership program for women in science
- Homeward Bound, a shelter for domestic-violence victims operated by the Marjaree Mason Center, Fresno, California

== See also ==
- Homebound (disambiguation)
- Homeward Hound, a What's New Scooby-Doo? episode
