= Pop the Trunk =

Single by Yelawolf

from the album Trunk Muzik 0-60
- Released: July 27, 2010
- Recorded: Columbia Sounds (Columbia, South Carolina)
- Genre: Hardcore hip-hop; horrorcore
- Length: 3:48
- Label: Ghet-O-Vision; DGC; Interscope
- Songwriters: M. Wayne Atha; W. Washington
- Producer: WillPower

Yelawolf singles chronology
"Pop the Trunk" (2010)	"I Just Wanna Party" (2010)

"Pop the Trunk" is a song by American rapper Yelawolf from his mixtape Trunk Muzik. It was originally released, with a music video, on July 27, 2010 as a single to promote Trunk Muzik, and has since been re-released as the lead single from his second EP, Trunk Muzik 0-60. The reason this particular song was chosen to be included in his official release was because he wanted to include 5 "fan favorites" in addition to 7 new songs, as this track is indeed one of—if not the—most well-known song by Yelawolf to date. The song's concept revolves around life in Gadsden, Alabama and the environment that the artist grew up in, as Yelawolf is essentially just describing his surroundings and the different events he's witnessed. Yelawolf described in an interview that this track was actually the first one he wrote for Trunk Muzik, and the first verse was basically a nod to his stepfather, who raised him. The title of the song refers to a popular slang term which involves retrieving a firearm from the trunk of one's automobile.

== Track listing ==
Digital download

1. "Pop the Trunk" - 3:48

== Music video ==
The music video for "Pop the Trunk" was based on a concept created by Yelawolf, and it was directed by Motion Family. The video incorporates different elements of the culture of the rural American South. The first part is filmed in Yelawolf's parents' house, in a wooded area of Gadsden, where his mother can be seen chopping meat with a meat cleaver on a porch that has a deceased deer hanging over her head. His stepfather is fixing an old Chevrolet pickup truck, and eventually gets a Mossberg pump shotgun to shoot a burglar that has been trespassing on his property, thus 'popping the trunk'. The burglar's corpse is seen lifeless. Later, he is seen sitting in the back seat of an old Chevrolet Monte Carlo, rapping recreationally. Yelawolf's mate, Shawty Fatt, pulls into the parking lot of a liquor store and sees someone with whom he's had a disagreement, leading him to pull out his gun and kill the man before speeding off. The majority of the video is shot at night, giving the video an eerie feeling. There are many instances where the artist is seen rapping in front of a makeshift fire in a trashcan in front of an abandoned vehicle, in a scrap junkyard, and in other places interwoven in between the main storyline (usually on a cold day).

== Trivia ==
"Pop the Trunk" is the song that Eminem's manager Paul Rosenberg showed him in a listening session before he signed with Shady Records. It was later included on the label's compilation album Shady XV, despite the song being released before he signed.

== Credits and personnel ==
- Songwriter – Michael Wayne Atha, William Washington
- Production – WillPower Co-Production UGM*-Dj~Master Kush(Shannon Jennings)

== Certifications ==
Region	Certification	Certified units/sales
New Zealand (RMNZ)	Gold	15,000^{‡}
United States (RIAA)	Gold	500,000^{‡}
^{‡} Sales+streaming figures based on certification alone.
