= Slumafia =

EP by Yelawolf and DJ Paul
- Released: April 16, 2021
- Recorded: 2020–2021
- Genre: Hip-hop; Southern hip-hop
- Length: 31:42
- Label: Slumerican; Scale-A-Ton
- Producer: DJ Paul; TWhy Xclusive

Yelawolf and DJ Paul chronology
Ghetto Cowboy (2019)	Slumafia (2021)	Mile Zero (2021)

Slumafia is the second collaborative extended play by American rappers Yelawolf and DJ Paul. It was released on April 16, 2021, by Slumerican and Scale-A-Ton. The album reunites Yelawolf with collaborator DJ Paul, of Three 6 Mafia, who produced the entirety of the EP. This marks the second Yelawolf project to be entirely produced by DJ Paul, following the release of the 2013 extended play, Black Fall. The album was part of Yelawolf's "April Onslaught", a series of weekly album releases in the month of April, which included Turquoise Tornado (with RiFF RAFF), Mile Zero (with DJ Muggs), and Mud Mouth. It was also released in close succession to the collaborative album Yelawolf Blacksheep, with rapper Caskey, which was released on February 19, 2021.

Recording sessions for the album took place at the House of Blues recording studio in Nashville, Tennessee, in late 2020, after the recording of Yelawolf Blacksheep was completed. Although it was the third Yelawolf project to be released in 2021, it was the final album to be recorded during this period. In addition to DJ Paul and Caskey, the album features Badd Wolf, Big Henri, Bray, Gangsta Boo, Seed of the 6ix and PRETTY SHY.

The name of the album is a combination of Yelawolf's record label, Slumerican, and DJ Paul's hip-hop group, Three 6 Mafia.

== Background and recording ==
Yelawolf first hinted at the album in September 2020, posting a picture of himself and DJ Paul on his official Instagram page. Writing "Serious on the back play. My brother DJ Paul ..you gotta love the family!!!" as well as tagging other current and former members of Three 6 Mafia in the post. Yelawolf formally announced the project on December 26, 2020, and initially intended to call the album Black Fall 2, writing "I’m feeling real Walnut Park vibes... My memories of life in Gadsden, Alabama can turn my smile upside down, but I’m thankful for that dark past. It allows me to rage when I need too, and get that shit out of me". However, the name of the album was later changed to Slumafia.

Yelawolf recorded the album at the House of Blues recording studio in Nashville, Tennessee. On February 13, 2021, Yelawolf confirmed he was finishing the album with DJ Paul.

The release date for the album was slated for April 16, 2021, as part Yelawolf's "April Onslaught", The release schedule included the collaborative album Turquoise Tornado with rapper, RiFF RAFF, and the studio albums Mile Zero, produced by DJ Muggs of Cypress Hill, and Mud Mouth, produced by Jim Jonsin.

== Track listing ==
- All tracks produced by DJ Paul and TWhy Xclusive.

No.	Title	Writer(s)	Length
1.	"Trans Am"	M. Atha; P. Beauregard	3:35
2.	"Tote The Bag" (featuring DJ Paul)	M. Atha; P. Beauregard	3:04
3.	"Lucchese" (featuring Badd Wolf)	M. Atha; P. Beauregard; A. Thompson	3:36
4.	"Still the Man"	M. Atha; P. Beauregard	2:59
5.	"Don't Need a Cup"	M. Atha; P. Beauregard	4:15
6.	"Slumafia" (featuring Big Henri, Bray, Gangsta Boo and Seed of 6ix)	M. Atha; P. Beauregard; A. Thompson; T. Dunigan; R. Dunigan Jr.; J. Henry; R. Byers; L. Mitchell	5:52
7.	"Super Geek"	M. Atha; P. Beauregard	3:27
8.	"Head Banger" (featuring PRETTY SHY and Caskey)	M. Atha; P. Beauregard; S. Scales; B. Caskey	4:59
Total length:			31:47

== Charts ==
Chart (2021)	Peak position
US Top Current Albums (Billboard)	94
