= Heart of Dixie =

Heart of Dixie may refer to:

- Heart of Dixie (film), 1989 American film
- Heart of Dixie (mixtape), mixtape by American rapper Yelawolf
- Heart of Dixie Railroad Museum
- "The Heart of Dixie" (song), a 2013 song by Danielle Bradbery
- Heart of Dixie, state nickname of Alabama

== See also ==
- Hart of Dixie, an American television series
- Hearts in Dixie, an American musical film
