= Trial by Fire (Yelawolf album) =

2017 album by Yelawolf

Studio album by Yelawolf
- Released: October 27, 2017
- Recorded: 2015–2017
- Studio: House of Blues Studios (Nashville, Tennessee)
- Genre: Country rap
- Length: 59:21
- Label: Slumerican; Shady; Interscope
- Producer: Yelawolf (also exec.); Christen Pinkston

Yelawolf chronology
Love Story (2015)	Trial by Fire (2017)	Trunk Muzik III (2019)

Singles from Trial by Fire
- 1. "Daylight" Released: September 23, 2016; 2. "Shadows" Released: October 28, 2016; 3. "Row Your Boat" Released: June 2, 2017; 4. "Punk" Released: September 1, 2017; 5. "Get Mine" Released: October 12, 2017

Professional ratings
Review scores
Source	Rating
AllMusic	3/5 stars
HipHopDX	4/5

Trial by Fire is the fourth studio album by American rapper Yelawolf. The album was released on October 27, 2017, by Slumerican, Shady Records and Interscope Records. This album was entirely produced by Yelawolf himself.

== Background ==
In August 2015, the same year as the release of Yelawolf's previous album, Love Story, he became mired in controversy when he decided to defend the confederate flag before reconsidering his stance and entirely rejecting the flag with a non-album track titled "To Whom It May Concern", which was released on October 30, 2015. The single addressed his upbringings and his disgust with the Charleston church shooting, a racially motivated mass shooting.

After the controversy had settled, on September 22, 2015, Yelawolf announced his fourth studio album, Trial By Fire. He alluded to the record being much darker than its predecessor, and also being produced entirely by himself and constant collaborators DJ Klever and Bones Owens, which Bones Owens is a former member of his band.

Work on Trial by Fire began in the House of Blues studio in Nashville, Tennessee. Yelawolf produced the album in its entirety, and brought in a small group of musicians to commence work on the album, including his tour DJ, DJ Klever, guitarist Bones Owens, and keyboardist Peter Keys from Lynyrd Skynyrd.

In order to support Trial By Fire, a tour was announced on July 18, 2016, and was due to run from October 13 to December 4. However, during the Oregon show, Yelawolf was seen destroying equipment belonging to Bones Owens, which subsequently caused Owens to fallout with Yelawolf and quit the band indefinitely (DJ Klever also left the band but would reunite with Yelawolf the following year). The incident was followed by an altercation with a fan at the Sacramento show resulting in Yelawolf leaving the stage and cancelling the remaining seven dates. After the cancellation of the tour, Yelawolf seemed to suffer an apparent mental breakdown and was admitted to a mental ward. After his release towards the end of December, Yelawolf announced via social media that he was dropping the "Yelawolf" stage name in favor of his birth name, the removed Instagram post announced "I decided to sober up and rebrand my new music as Michael Wayne Atha MWA". This came as a result of the death of long-time friend and collaborator Shawty Fatt and his break-up with fiancé Fefe Dobson. During this time, Yelawolf also drastically changed the country style he had adopted during the release of Love Story to that a contemporary hip hop image, before retreating from public life for over six months. During this period, the status of the unreleased Trial By Fire album and Yelawolf's involvement with Shady Records were left undetermined.

On June 6, 2017, Yelawolf announced a return to the music scene with the release of the third single for Trial By Fire titled "Row Your Boat", with his "Yelawolf" moniker once again in use. Yelawolf launched another tour to support the album titled the "51/50" tour, with the name alluding to the term police or doctors use towards patients that are an endangerment to themselves and others, referencing his mental breakdown from the previous year. During the tour, Yelawolf would re-visit all the venues that were cancelled during his previous tour, free of charge to those who had bought a ticket for the former.

== Release ==
Release of the album was also overshadowed by the release of Eminem's highly anticipated album, Revival. A picture uploaded by Shady Records CEO Paul Rosenberg holding a copy of Trial By Fire became the subject of intense online speculation after an advertisement was seen in the background promoting "Revival" medication. The album was released on October 27, 2017, with little promotion and was seen as a commercial failure, selling only around 12,000 copies in its first week compared to Love Story's 61,000, but was better received by critics. Yelawolf dismissed to the low sales by stating "If you're counting the first week record sales of your favorite artist these days, then you might have forgotten the reason why you love music".

== Musical composition, style, and lyrics ==
The album continues the blend of Country music and hip hop that began with the release of 2015's Love Story, and was described by Yelawolf as a "darker", loose-concept record that details his upbringing in the South. Several songs reference his birth, childhood, and the people that made an impact on him growing up. The album also deals with various contemporary issues in his life, such as his struggles with alcoholism as well at the impact he is attempting to make on his family. The album begins with a skit of Yelawolf performing at a bar by recounting a tale about his birth, and describes himself as the reincarnation of an outlaw bank robber. The track "Shadows" also recounts his childhood, growing up in a house full of criminal bikers. The song "Get Mine" featuring Kid Rock is described as a "throwback to the days of nu-metal", while on "Son of a Gun", Yelawolf details the struggles of growing up without a father. The single "Daylight" was chronicled as an "ode to alcohol", and the political track "Row Your Boat" tackles the subject police brutality and uniqueness. "Sabrina" recounts a fictional, first-person perspective of the horror of man who lost a child by way of drowning, and the collaboration between Yelawolf and Lee Brice tells the perspectives of three different people, a war soldier with PTSD, an abused housewife, and the struggles Yelawolf himself faces. The last song "Keeps Me Alive" features vocals from country singer Wynonna Judd, and reflects again with Yelawolf's short-comings as a child and young adult and how that translates to his current life as a father.

Since the album was released about one year after its initially planned date due, it features artists whom Yelawolf was not on good terms with at the time of the release, most notably guitarist Bones Owens, who quit Yelawolf's band after an on-stage meltdown. Owens is still credited as co-producer for the majority of the tracks, however, and his vocals appear on the song "True to Yourself".

== Singles ==
The album's first single "Daylight" was released on September 23, 2016. The album's second single "Shadows" featuring Joshua Hedley was released on October 28, 2016. The third single "Row Your Boat" was released on June 2, 2017, while the fourth single, "Punk" featuring Travis Barker and Juicy J, was released on September 1, 2017.

== Track listing ==
- All tracks produced by Yelawolf, track 10 produced along with Christen Pinkston.

No.	Title	Writer(s)	Length
1.	"Trial by Fire" (Intro)	Michael Atha; Caleb Owens; Peter Pisarczyk	4:42
2.	"Shadows" (featuring Joshua Hedley)	Atha; Owens; Hedley	5:11
3.	"Get Mine" (featuring Kid Rock)	Atha; Robert Ritchie; Owens; Pisarczyk; Roger Miller	4:23
4.	"Son of a Gun"	Atha; Owens; Pisarczyk	4:58
5.	"Ride or Die"	Atha; Owens	4:46
6.	"Struggle Speaks" (Interlude)	Atha; Will Harness	1:27
7.	"Daylight"	Atha; Owens; Pisarczyk	4:47
8.	"Do for Love"	Atha; Owens; Pisarczyk	4:03
9.	"Punk" (featuring Travis Barker and Juicy J)	Atha; Jordan Houston; Barker; Owens; Pisarczyk; Michael Balzary	3:34
10.	"Row Your Boat"	Atha; Owens; Pisarczyk	4:15
11.	"True to Yourself" (featuring Bones Owens)	Atha; Owens	5:17
12.	"Sabrina"	Atha	2:54
13.	"Violin" (featuring Lee Brice)	Atha; Owens	4:25
14.	"Keeps Me Alive" (featuring Wynonna Judd)	Atha; Judd; Owens; Pisarczyk	4:39
Total length:			59:21

Sample credits

- "Get Mine" contains elements of "The Choice Is Yours (Revisited)" written by Black Sheep and excerpts from "Engine Engine #9" written by Roger Miller.
- "Daylight" contains elements of "Living Together Is Keeping Us Apart" performed by Clarence Reid.
- "Violin" contains elements of "Hard to Concentrate" performed by the Red Hot Chili Peppers.

== Personnel ==
Adapted from the Trial by Fire liner notes.

Vocals

- Gil Gand – background vocals (track 1)
- The McCrary Sisters – background vocals (tracks 1, 2, 11)

Instruments

- Caleb "Bones" Owens – acoustic guitar, bass guitar, dobro, electric guitar, lap steel guitar, mandolin
- Flea – bass guitar (track 9)
- Robby Turner – lap steel guitar (track 6)
- Chance McCoy – banjo (track 7), fiddle (tracks 7, 9)
- Zach Casebolt – violin (tracks 2, 12, 13)
- Lindsey Smith-Trostle – cello (tracks 2, 12, 13)
- Peter Keys – piano, synth, accordion (track 9), mellotron (track 14)
- Vinnie Ciesielski – trumpet (track 11)
- Shannon Boone – drums (track 3)
- The Postman – harmonica (tracks 3, 4)
- DJ Klever – turntables (track 9)
- Michael Atha – drum programming, synth bass

Production

- Leland Elliot – recording engineer
- Jim Jonsin – mixing
- Rob Marks – mixing
- Niko Marzouca – mixing
- Mike Bozzi – mastering (Bernie Grundman Mastering; Hollywood, California)

Imagery

- Tyzayah Gold Kiser – art direction and design
- Ryan Smith – photography

== Charts ==
Chart (2017)	Peak position
Australian Albums (ARIA)	41
Canadian Albums (Billboard)	16
Czech Albums (ČNS IFPI)	89
New Zealand Albums (RMNZ)	40
Scottish Albums (Official Charts)	98
Swiss Albums (Schweizer Hitparade)	76
US Billboard 200	42
US Top R&B/Hip-Hop Albums (Billboard)	23
