= Arena Rap =

EP by Yelawolf
- Released: December 28, 2008
- Recorded: 2008–09; PatchWerk Recording Studios (Atlanta, Georgia); Sixteen Feet Studio (College Park, Georgia)
- Genre: Rap rock; hip-hop
- Label: Ghet-O-Vision Entertainment; Redd Klay Entertainment
- Producer: KP; Malay; Jeremy "J Dot" Jones; Courtney Sills

Yelawolf chronology
Stereo (2008)	Arena Rap (2008)	Trunk Muzik (2010)

Professional ratings
Review scores
Source	Rating
RapReviews	7/10

Arena Rap is the first extended play by American rapper Yelawolf. It was released on December 28, 2008 under record label Ghet-O-Vision Entertainment and management group Redd Klay Entertainment.

== Track listing ==
No.	Title	Writer(s)	Producer(s)	Length
1.	"Back to Bama"	M. Atha; K. Prather; J. Ho	KP; Malay	4:19
2.	"Candy & Dreams"	Atha; Prather; Ho	KP; Malay	4:14
3.	"Enjoy the View"	Atha; Prather; Ho	KP; Malay	4:11
4.	"All Aboard"	Atha; Prather; Ho	KP; Malay	4:24
5.	"Come on Over"	Atha; E. Bodin; J. González	José González	3:22
6.	"Stage Lights"	Atha; Prather; Ho	KP; Malay	3:32
7.	"Gone"	Atha; B. Simmons; G. Kihn	Jim Jonsin; DJ Ideal	4:10

Sample credits

- "Come on Over" samples "Down the Line" by José González.
- "Gone" interpolates "The Breakup Song (They Don't Write 'Em)" by The Greg Kihn Band.

== Personnel ==
- Yelawolf – vocals
- Ashanti Floyd – fiddle, violin
- Gabriel Artime – turntables, drums
- Malay – guitars, keyboards, programming, executive producer
- Kawan Prather – executive producer
- Jeremy Jones – associate producer
- Courtney Sills – associate producer
- José González – producer, vocals, composer
- Jim Jonsin – producer
- DJ Ideal – producer
- Greg Kihn – composer
- The Hydrilla – designer, artwork
