= Homeward =

Homeward may refer to:

- Homeward (film), a 2019 film
- "Homeward" (song), a song by The Sundays from their 1997 album Static and Silence
- "Homeward" (TNG episode), a Star Trek: The Next Generation episode from the seventh season
- Homeward, a 2020 mockbuster animated film by The Asylum to Pixar's Onward

== See also ==
- Homeward Bound (disambiguation)
