= Mud Mouth =

Studio album by Yelawolf
- Released: April 30, 2021
- Genre: Southern hip-hop: country rap
- Length: 59:18
- Label: Slumerican
- Producer: Jim Jonsin

Yelawolf chronology
Slumafia (2021)	Mud Mouth (2021)	War Story (2024)

Mud Mouth is the seventh studio album by American rapper Yelawolf, released on April 30, 2021, by Slumerican. It is his third independent studio album, after his 2005 debut Creekwater, and his 2019 album Ghetto Cowboy. The album contains 14 tracks, it is fully produced by longtime collaborator Jim Jonsin and features guest vocals from artists Jelly Roll and Struggle Jennings. Yelawolf announced that this would be his last hip-hop album, with his first rock album Sometimes Y arriving in 2022.

== Production and style ==
Yelawolf explained the name of the album in an interview: "It was a great name. All of my albums start with a title. I’ve never put an album together that started with a song. A lot of the time, it’ll start with a title and even the artwork. I’ll visualize what the album is supposed to look like from the outside, then I’ll fill the pages in. That’s how I create albums, so Mud Mouth made sense to me. It’s something about the word. Mud Mouth became the actual name for the brand of LSD in the Mud Mouth Movie which is based on an LSD trip. Life and death, but more a spiritual life and death. Throughout that, I hit on most of my career. In one way, shape, or form. Mud Mouth hits on the past 10 years of my career, from the beginning till now."

== Release ==
The album was released on April 30, 2021.

== Film ==
Mud Mouth was also accompanied by trailer for Yelawolf’s forthcoming film of the same name, which seems to be centered around the rapper taking a psychoactive drug and going on an otherworldly adventure of sorts with the likes of frequent collaborator DJ Paul.

== Track listing ==
No.	Title	Length
1.	"Light as a Feather"	4:25
2.	"Oh No"	4:04
3.	"Bounce"	4:25
4.	"Conoco"	4:18
5.	"Dope"	4:59
6.	"Rocks at Your Window"	5:21
7.	"HillBilly Einstein"	5:21
8.	"Money (featuring Jelly Roll & Struggle Jennings)"	5:18
9.	"Losers Win Again"	1:16
10.	"Dog House"	4:39
11.	"Homeward Bound"	1:54
12.	"Aquanet"	4:39
13.	"Hot"	4:03
14.	"Mud Mouth"	4:30
Total length:		59:18
