= Trunk Muzik =

Mixtape by American rapper

Mixtape by Yelawolf
- Released: January 1, 2010
- Recorded: 2009
- Genre: Hip-hop
- Length: 45:12
- Label: Ghet-O-Vision
- Producers: WLPWR; Malay & KP; Kane Beatz

Yelawolf chronology
Arena Rap (2008)	Trunk Muzik (2010)	Trunk Muzik 0-60 (2010)

Trunk Muzik is a mixtape by American rapper Yelawolf, released on January 1, 2010. It features ten all new songs and two remixes. It is hosted by DJ Burn One and contains production from WLPWR, Malay & KP and Kane Beatz and features guest appearances from Bun B, Rittz, Diamond, Raekwon and Juelz Santana.

== Track listing ==
No.	Title	Producer(s)	Length
1.	"Trunk Muzik"	WLPWR	3:40
2.	"Stage Lights (Remix)"	Malay & KP	3:35
3.	"Good To Go" (featuring Bun B)	WLPWR	3:39
4.	"Pop the Trunk"	WLPWR	3:49
5.	"Box Chevy Pt. 3" (featuring Rittz)	WLPWR	4:23
6.	"F.U."	WLPWR	3:15
7.	"Lick the Cat" (featuring Diamond)	WLPWR	3:36
8.	"Speak Her Sex" (featuring Nikkiya)	WLPWR	2:53
9.	"I Wish" (featuring Raekwon)	Malay & KP	4:30
10.	"In This Club"	WLPWR	4:00
11.	"Love Is Not Enough"	WLPWR	3:46
12.	"Mixin' Up the Medicine (Remix)" (featuring Juelz Santana)	Kane Beatz	4:06
Total length:			45:12

== Trunk Muzik 0-60 ==
Trunk Muzik 0-60

EP by Yelawolf
- Released: November 22, 2010
- Recorded: 2009–10; S-Line Studios (Atlanta, Georgia); Tree Sound Studios (Norcross, Georgia); Sixteen Feet Studio (College Park, Georgia); Hands of God Studio (Los Angeles, California); Columbia Sounds (Columbia, South Carolina); Circle House Recording Studios (Miami, Florida)
- Genre: Hip-hop
- Length: 47:33
- Labels: Ghet-O-Vision; DGC; Interscope
- Producers: Kawan "KP" Prather (also exec.); WLPWR; Malay; Drama Beats; Cameron Wallace; Droop-E; Jim Jonsin; Jerry Duplessis

Yelawolf chronology
Trunk Muzik (2010)	Trunk Muzik 0-60 (2010)	Radioactive (2011)

Trunk Muzik 0-60 is the second extended play by American rapper Yelawolf. It was released on November 22, 2010, by Interscope Records. The EP features guest appearances by Gucci Mane, Rock City, Rittz, Bun B and Raekwon; and features six tracks taken from his last mixtape titled Trunk Muzik. Production was handled by WLPWR, Jim Jonsin and Drama Beats, among others.

=== Composition and music structure ===
The accompanying music video for the song "Daddy's Lambo" was released. The album's third track "That's What We on Now", has instrumentation that includes "Klaxon synthesizers and a swift, ticking beat". The mixtape's second single, "I Just Wanna Party" featuring Gucci Mane. "Billy Crystal" is a song featuring music duo Rock City. "Pop the Trunk" was chosen as the album's lead single. This track features instrumentation that includes piano and saxophone. Lyrically, "Pop the Trunk" describes an "account of street justice" and "meth dealers in Appalachia". "Box Chevy" featuring Rittz. "Good to Go" featuring Bun B; an accompanying music video was released. "Marijuana" is the most prominent representation of rock music on Trunk Muzik 0-60. The album's tenth track "Love Is Not Enough", has been described as an "aching ballad". "I Wish" is a song featuring Raekwon. "Get the Fuck Up!" is used as one of the tracks on a video game Madden NFL '12 and at the beginning of the 9th episode of 2 season of Power.

=== Release and reception ===
Professional ratings
Trunk Muzik 0-60
Review scores
Source	Rating
AllHipHop	7.5/10
AllMusic	3/5 stars
The A.V. Club	(B)
Rolling Stone	3.5/5 stars
Spin	(8/10)

Trunk Muzik 0-60 was released in the United States on November 22, 2010, by Interscope Records. On the week ending of November 28, 2010, Trunk Muzik 0-60 selling 5,000 copies in its first week. The EP peaked at number one on the Top Heatseekers Albums Chart, at number 16 on the Top Rap Albums Chart, and at number 26 on the Top R&B Albums Chart. As of March 2012, the EP has sold 108,000 copies in the United States. "Pop the Trunk" and "I Just Wanna Party" were released as singles; the former failed to rank on national chart, while the latter charted on the Bubbling Under Hot 100 Singles at number 9. As of October 2012, the album has sold 171,204 copies. As of August 2013, the album has sold 210,000 copies in the United States.

=== 0-60 Track listing ===
No.	Title	Writer(s)	Producer(s)	Length
1.	"Get the Fuck Up!"	Michael Atha; James Ho; William Washington	WLPWR; Malay (co.)	3:04
2.	"Daddy's Lambo"	Atha; Christopher Pfaff; Cameron Wallace	Drama Beats; Cameron Wallace (co.)	3:48
3.	"That's What We on Now"	Atha; Kawan Prather; Washington	Droop-E; WLPWR	4:42
4.	"I Just Wanna Party" (featuring Gucci Mane)	Atha; Radric Davis; Prather; Washington	WLPWR	5:12
5.	"Billy Crystal" (featuring Rock City)	Atha; James Scheffer; Timothy Thomas & Theron Thomas	Jim Jonsin; Jerry Duplessis	4:00
6.	"Pop the Trunk"	Atha; Washington	WLPWR	3:48
7.	"Box Chevy Pt. 3" (featuring Rittz)	Atha; Jonny McCullom; Washington	WLPWR	4:53
8.	"Good to Go" (featuring Bun B)	Atha; Bernard Freeman; Washington	WLPWR	3:38
9.	"Marijuana"	Atha; Washington	WLPWR	3:00
10.	"Love Is Not Enough"	Atha; James Johnson Jr.; Washington	WLPWR	3:44
11.	"I Wish" (featuring Raekwon)	Atha; Ho; Prather; Corey Woods	Malay; Kawan "KP" Prather	4:22
12.	"Trunk Muzik"	Atha; Washington	WLPWR	3:41

Sample credits

- "Love Is Not Enough" contains a sample of "Hollywood" by Rick James, and an interpolation of "Anythang" by Devin The Dude
- "Marijuana" features a sample of "Moist Vagina" by Nirvana

== Personnel ==
- Yelawolf – vocals, composer
- Ray Alba – publicity
- Marcus Beatty – engineer
- Shannon Jennings – engineer, audio mixing, audio mastering
- Ian Blanton – engineer
- Janine Booth – vocals
- Leslie Brathwaite – mixing
- Nikkiya Brooks – vocals
- Bun B – vocals
- Laura Carter – marketing coordination
- Regina Davenport – A&R
- Archie Davis – marketing coordination
- Radric Davis – composer
- Dennis Dennehy – publicity
- Seneca Doss – marketing coordination
- Andrew Flad – marketing
- Bernard Freeman – composer
- Gucci Mane – vocals
- James Ho – composer
- Matt Huber – assistant
- Rick James – composer
- Irvin Johnson – engineer
- Jeremy Jones – management
- Jim Jonsin – instrumentation, producer, programming
- Dave Kutch – mastering
- Amanda Lunt – A&R
- Robert Marks – engineer, mixing
- Hannibal Matthews – photography
- Tristan McClain – engineer
- Sean Mccoy – assistant
- Jonny McCullom – composer
- Todd Parker – A&R
- Chris Pfaff – composer, instrumentation, producer, programming
- Bradley Post – engineer
- Kawan Prather – composer, A&R, executive producer
- Raekwon – vocals
- Christopher Richardson – engineer
- Rock City – vocals
- James Schafer – composer
- Shawty Fatt – vocals
- Courtney Sills – management
- Muzzy Solis – assistant
- Theron Thomas – composer
- Timothy Thomas – composer
- Tamara Tickaradze – vocals
- Andrew Van Meter – production coordination
- Cameron Wallace – composer, instrumentation, producer, programming
- William Washington – composer
- Jason Wilkie – assistant
- Willpower – instrumentation, producer, programming
- Jason Wilson – assistant
- Luke Wood – A&R
- Corey Woods – composer
- Ian the Zevos – creation
