= Black Fall =

EP by Yelawolf and DJ Paul
- Released: October 31, 2013
- Recorded: 2013
- Genre: Hip-hop
- Label: Slumerican; Shady
- Producer: DJ Paul; TWhy Xclusive

Black Fall is a collaborative extended play by American rappers Yelawolf and DJ Paul, hosted by DJ Whoo Kid. It was released free for download on October 31, 2013, through Slumerican and Shady Records. Production was handled solely by DJ Paul. The five-track mixtape features a guest appearance from Rittz the Rapper.

== Track listing ==
- All tracks produced by DJ Paul and TWhy Xclusive, track 5 only produced by DJ Paul.

No.	Title	Writer(s)	Length
1.	"Get Straight"	M. Atha; P. Beauregard	4:03
2.	"Mastermind"	M. Atha; P. Beauregard	5:02
3.	"Bowties" (featuring Rittz)	M. Atha; J. McCollum; P. Beauregard	4:23
4.	"Party Prophet" (featuring DJ Paul)	M. Atha; P. Beauregard	5:01
5.	"Light Switch"	M. Atha; P. Beauregard	4:51

Sample credits

- "Get Straight" samples "Here to Stay" by Korn.
- "Mastermind" samples "Comfortably Numb" by Pink Floyd.
- "Bowties" samples "For Whom the Bell Tolls" by Metallica.
- "Party Prophet" samples "The Sign of the Southern Cross" by Black Sabbath.
- "Light Switch" samples "Uprising" by Muse.

== Personnel ==
- Michael Wayne Atha – vocals
- Paul Duane Beauregard – vocals (track 4), producer
- Jonathan McCollum – vocals (track 3)
- Yves Mondesir – host
- Josh Winkler – design
