= Ghetto Cowboy (album) =

Studio album by Yelawolf
- Released: November 1, 2019
- Recorded: 2016, 2018-2019
- Studio: Blackbird (Berry Hill, Tennessee)
- Genre: Hip-hop; Southern hip-hop; country rap; rap rock
- Length: 50:25
- Label: Slumerican
- Producer: Yelawolf; Mike Hartnett; DJ Paul; Jim Jonsin; DJ Klever; Brian Jones; TWhy Xclusive

Yelawolf chronology
Trunk Muzik 3 (2019)	Ghetto Cowboy (2019)	Slumafia (2021)

Singles from Ghetto Cowboy
- 1. "Unnatural Born Killer" Released: August 9, 2019; 2. "Opie Taylor" Released: October 11, 2019

Ghetto Cowboy is the sixth studio album by American rapper Yelawolf, released on October 31, 2019. It is his second independent studio album, after his 2005 debut Creekwater, and his first since departing from Eminem's imprint Shady Records, and its parent label, Interscope Records, following the release of Trunk Muzik 3 earlier in the year. The album's title is a homage to the 1998 hit single of the same name by the hip-hop collective Mo Thugs.

Sessions for the album began at Blackbird Studio (the same studio where Yelawolf recorded his Gold-certified record, Love Story, in 2015), shortly after the release of Yelawolf's fifth album. Production was handled by long-time collaborators Jim Jonsin, DJ Klever, DJ Paul, and Brian Jones, who worked on several tracks for Yelawolf's weekly freestyle series leading up to the release of Trunk Muzik 3.

This also marks the first time Yelawolf released two studio albums in the same year (along with Trunk Muzik 3), and the first time one of his studio albums is solely released by Slumerican Records, an extension of his lifestyle and culture brand with retail headquarters based in Nashville, Tennessee. The album was supported by the singles "Unnatural Born Killer", released on August 9, 2019, and "Opie Taylor", released on October 11, 2019.

== Background ==
While on tour supporting the release of his fifth album, Yelawolf announced his tenure on Eminem's imprint Shady Records would be finished after the release of Trunk Muzik 3. This marked the end of a 4-album, 8-year contract with the label and its parent company Interscope Records. All of Yelawolf's future releases would be distributed independently through his own label, Slumerican Records, which had been jointly releasing his music in partnership with Shady and Interscope since the release of 2015's Love Story. Trunk Muzik 3 was released on March 29, 2019, and with his contract finalized, Yelawolf began to work on Ghetto Cowboy.

Yelawolf appears in the film The Peanut Butter Falcon as "Rat Boy", co-starring Shia LaBeouf, Dakota Johnson, Bruce Dern, Thomas Haden Church, and directed by Tyler Nilson and Michael Schwartz. The film premiered at SXSW on March 9, 2019. Several locations from the film (shot in Savannah, Georgia) are shown in the video for the album's second single "Opie Taylor". Around this time, Yelawolf revealed a vastly different fashion approach by dying his hair bright red, comparing himself to the character Opie Taylor, portrayed by Ron Howard for the popular television show The Andy Griffith Show. The second single from the album is named in reference to the character.

On August 2, 2019, Yelawolf announced the first single for the album titled "Unnatural Born Killer, under the acronym "UBK", would be released on August 9, 2019. He made this announcement by playing a cassette preview of the single on a X-Bass boombox. He then lit the boombox on fire, with the burning fire determining how long of a snippet could be heard before the boombox and tape were destroyed. The music video for the single was released on August 16, 2019.

Yelawolf hosted his third annual "Devil's Pass" bike run, which traversed several states in the country, and then, on October 9, 2019, Yelawolf embarked on a 25-date North American tour in support of the album, appropriately titled the "Ghetto Cowboy Tour". The shows commenced in Colorado and finalized in Kentucky, visiting various venues in different areas of the United States, as well as Canada.

== Production and style ==
During a formal announcement of the album, Yelawolf stated "Ghetto Cowboy has been the most gratifying to me as an artist being that it's my first indie release on my own label. I have no one to answer to and that can be a scary responsibility. After Love Story, Trial By Fire and then Trunk Muzik 3, I feel like I got a well-rounded project that speaks to all the fans; hip hop, rock'n'roll, and southern fans alike". When commenting on the stylistic approach of the album, Yelawolf stated "I ain't reinventing the wheel here, just doing what I love to do, doing what I think is dope and original. I never want to stop challenging the genre or the listener or become complacent or settled cause that's boring as fuck to me and the fans. [Ghetto Cowboy] is unapologetic, brutally honest and at times completely vulnerable." During this announcement, Yelawolf also stated that the album will first be available to stream through YouTube on Halloween, the day before it sees a wide release on November 1, 2019.

== Track listing ==
No.	Title	Producer(s)	Length
1.	"Mama Wolf"	Yelawolf	1:27
2.	"Unnatural Born Killer"	Brian Jones	3:16
3.	"Opie Taylor"	DJ Klever	3:52
4.	"Box Chevy 7"	Mike Hartnett	4:04
5.	"Here I Am"	Mike Hartnett; Yelawolf	3:52
6.	"Still Ridin'"	DJ Klever	2:54
7.	"Lightning"	Mike Hartnett	4:35
8.	"Renegades"	Jim Jonsin	3:55
9.	"So Long"	Jim Jonsin	3:55
10.	"You and Me"	Jim Jonsin	4:02
11.	"A Message from DJ Paul"	Yelawolf	0:53
12.	"Country Rich" (featuring DJ Paul)	DJ Paul; TWhy Xclusive	3:53
13.	"Keep on Rollin" (featuring CookUpBoss & Big Henry)	DJ Klever	4:14
14.	"Ghetto Cowboy"	Brian Jones; Kenneth Howell	5:25
Total length:			50:25

== Charts ==
Chart (2019)	Peak position
Australian Albums (ARIA)	60
Canadian Albums (Billboard)	47
New Zealand Albums (RMNZ)	30
US Billboard 200	76
US Top R&B/Hip-Hop Albums (Billboard)	40
