= Homebound =

Homebound or Home Bound may refer to:

== Film ==
- Homebound (1989 film), a Finnish crime drama film
- Homebound (2025 film), an Indian drama film

== Music ==
- "Home Bound", a 1978 instrumental by Ted Nugent
- Home Bound, a 1980 album by Shōgo Hamada
- Home Bound, a 1994 album by House of Krazees
- Homebound, a 2018 album by Sithu Aye

== Literature ==
- Home Bound: Filipino American Lives across Cultures, Communities, and Countries, a 2003 book by Yen Le Espiritu

== See also ==
- Homeward Bound (disambiguation)
- Housebound (disambiguation)
- Bounding Home, a racehorse
