= The Slumdon Bridge =

2012 EP by Ed Sheeran and Yelawolf

EP by Ed Sheeran and Yelawolf
- Released: 14 February 2012; 24 April 2012 (Digital re-release)
- Recorded: 2011
- Length: 14:03
- Labels: Self-released; Interscope (Digital re-release)
- Producer: Jake Gosling

Ed Sheeran chronology
+ (2011)	The Slumdon Bridge (2012)	x (2014)

Yelawolf chronology
Radioactive (2011)	The Slumdon Bridge (2012)	Heart of Dixie (2012)

Singles from The Slumdon Bridge
- 1. "You Don't Know (For Fuck's Sake)" Released: 24 January 2012

Professional ratings
Review scores
Source	Rating
AllHipHop	8/10

The Slumdon Bridge is a collaborative EP by English singer-songwriter, Ed Sheeran and American rapper, Yelawolf. It was released on 14 February 2012 as a free digital download in the United Kingdom. The second track of the EP, "You Don't Know (For Fuck's Sake)", was released as a free download via Sheeran's Twitter page and on numerous hip-hop websites on 24 January, as the lead single.

A trailer for the project was released, showing both artists in the studio recording the EP. The EP was released in the United States on 24 April 2012 via iTunes under Interscope Records.

== Track listing ==
- All tracks produced by Jake Gosling.

No.	Title	Length
1.	"London Bridge"	4:54
2.	"You Don't Know (For Fuck's Sake)"	3:33
3.	"Faces"	3:19
4.	"Tone"	2:17
Total length:		14:03
