= Housebound =

Housebound may refer to:

- Housebound (2000 film), an American thriller film directed by Mari Kornhauser
- Housebound (2014 film), a New Zealand horror comedy film directed by Gerard Johnstone
- the state of being under house arrest
- Home care supported living

== See also ==
- Homebound (disambiguation)
