= Homeward Bound (Australian TV series) =

- Genre: Variety
- Presented by: "Sparks" Murphy
- Country of origin: Australia
- Original language: English

Original release
- Network: ABV-2
- Release: 12 October – 21 December 1958

Homeward Bound is an Australian television variety series. Produced by and broadcast on Melbourne station ABV-2, the first episode aired 12 October 1958, while the final episode aired 21 December 1958. ABC variety series generally had shorter seasons than those on commercial television.

Featuring a "sea shanties" theme, the series was hosted by "Sparks" Murphy, and regulars on the program were Alan Eddy, Mervyn Bray, Paul Gavin, William Smith. Other performers who appeared during the run of the series included accordion player Egidio Bortoli, and hornpipe dancer Michael Thomas.

It is not known if any of the episodes are still extant, given the erratic survival rate of Australian television series of the 1950s.
