= Radioactive (Yelawolf album) =

Studio album by Yelawolf
- Released: November 21, 2011
- Recorded: 2010–11; Conway Recording Studios; 213 Studio; E Studio; Charlice Recording (Los Angeles, California); Effigy Studios (Ferndale, Michigan); Future Music Recording Studios (Las Vegas, Nevada); Parkland Playhouse (Parkland, Florida); PatchWerk Recording Studios (Atlanta, Georgia); Tree Sound Studios (Norcross, Georgia)
- Genre: Hip-hop
- Length: 57:22
- Labels: Ghet-O-Vision; DGC; Shady; Interscope
- Producers: Eminem (also exec.); Kawan "KP" Prather (co-exec.); The Audibles; Blaqsmurph; Borgore; Diplo; Emanuel Kiriakou; Tha Hydrox; Jim Jonsin; J.U.S.T.I.C.E. League; Mr. Pyro; Phonix Beats; Poo Bear; Sasha Sirota; WLPWR

Yelawolf chronology
Trunk Muzik 0-60 (2010)	Radioactive (2011)	The Slumdon Bridge (2012)

Singles from Radioactive
- 1. "Hard White (Up in the Club)" Released: August 8, 2011; 2. "Let's Roll" Released: October 28, 2011

Radioactive (also known as Radioactive: Amazing and Mystifying Chemical Tricks) is the second studio album and major label debut by American rapper Yelawolf. It was released on November 21, 2011 through Ghet-O-Vision Entertainment, DGC Records, Shady Records, and Interscope Records. The album features guest appearances from Shawty Fatt, Mystikal, Kid Rock, Lil Jon, Rittz, Gangsta Boo, Eminem, Poo Bear, Priscilla Renea, Fefe Dobson, Mona Moua and Killer Mike.

== Recording ==
Recording sessions took place at Las Vegas Valley, Nevada in two weeks.

== Music composition, style, and lyrics ==
Radioactive covers many different styles of hip-hop fusions, being alternative hip-hop as principal musical genre. Hardcore hip-hop is represented on the tracks "Radioactive Introduction", "Throw It Up", "Get Away", and "Slumerican Shitizen". A horrorcore rap style is used in "Growin' Up in the Gutter", whereas "Hard White (Up in the Club)" is a crunk party track. "Let's Roll", "Write Your Name", and "Radio" follow a pop rap style, with catchy hooks and beats. "Animal" is a fast-paced hip-hop party track with a dubstep influenced beat. "Good Girl" utilizes an R&B-tinged feel, while "The Hardest Love Song in the World" is a g-funk hip-hop track. Yelawolf covers a variety of lyrical themes in these album, from gangsta rap lyrics in "Get Away" and "Throw It Up", to more conscious and slightly political tracks such as "Made in the USA", "Slumerican Shitizen", "Write Your Name", and "The Last Song". "Radio" is about the internet taking over how music and music videos are received by fans. It also refers to radio stations playing the same songs constantly and singers being discovered via the internet. The song contains several references to rock and rap artists and their songs from the past."Write your Name" is produced by J.U.S.T.I.C.E. League With samples from the Reza Pishro "Tehran". The album's final track, titled "The Last Song" described as very personal about Yelawolf's life, and it's a very emotional final letter to his absent biological father and talks about other past struggles.

== Singles ==
The album's first single "Hard White (Up in the Club)" was released on August 8, 2011. The song features guest vocals by Lil Jon and it was produced by Hydrox. The music video was filmed in Atlanta, Georgia, and directed by Motion Family. On September 20, the music video for "Hard White (Up in the Club)" was released through VEVO. The remix to "Hard White (Up in the Club)" was released on November 2; the song features T.I., and label-mates Slaughterhouse.

On October 28, 2011, Yelawolf released the album's second single "Let's Roll" featuring Kid Rock. The song was produced by The Audibles, Mr. Pyro, and Eminem.

=== Other songs ===
The track, titled "No Hands" was featured on the video game Driver: San Francisco. Yelawolf partnered up to release the music video with Ubisoft and Complex. The music video was filmed at several major landmarks in San Francisco, California, and directed by Erick Peyton, who is well known for his direction on Snoop Dogg's music video for his song "That Tree". The song did not make it on the album.

Yelawolf filmed a 12-minute short horror film for the track "Growin' Up in the Gutter", which features rapper Rittz. Although the track was not released as a single the short film finally premiered on July 4. It was directed by Tyler Clinton and Yelawolf credited as Michael Wayne for Slumerican, the short film was titled "Gutter".

== Critical reception ==
Professional ratings
Aggregate scores
Source	Rating
Metacritic	(62/100)
Review scores
Source	Rating
AllHipHop	(6/10)
AllMusic	4/5 stars
Consequence of Sound	3/5 stars
Los Angeles Times	2.5/4 stars
Paste	(7.2/10)
Pitchfork Media	(6.5/10)
PopMatters	(4/10)
Rolling Stone	3/5 stars
Spin	(7/10)
XXL	(XL)

According to the review aggregator Metacritic, Radioactive received "generally favorable reviews" based on a weighted average score of 62 out of 100 from 17 critic scores. Before release, the album was noted by the influential hip-hop magazine The Source as being a near classic, with a 4.5/5 rating. Acclaimed hip-hop magazine XXL gave the album a 4/5 (XL) rating, saying "more than not, the album is a standout effort that introduces the full-range of his talents as an MC with crafty songwriting abilities and deft ear for a sonic palette". Prefix Magazine stated that it was "hard to view Radioactive in any context that doesn’t label it as a total artistic failure" and that Yelawolf was "rolling over to commercial demands". PopMatters echoed this sentiment, calling the album a "misguided grasp at populism" and criticising Yelawolf's willingness to "play second fiddle" to A&R demands. Complex Magazine rated Radioactive at number 18 in the 25 Best Albums of 2011. XXL ranked Radioactive at number 10 for the best albums of 2011.

== Commercial performance ==
The album debuted at number 27 on the US Billboard 200, with 41,000 copies sold in its first week. It has sold 208,000 copies in the US as of April 2015.

== Track listing ==
No.	Title	Writer(s)	Producer(s)	Length
1.	"Radioactive Introduction"	Michael Atha; William Washington	WLPWR	2:57
2.	"Get Away" (featuring Shawty Fatt and Mystikal)	Atha; Darius Barnes; Jerrico Horton; M. Horton; Michael Tyler; Shuggie Otis	Phonix Beats	3:23
3.	"Let's Roll" (featuring Kid Rock)	Atha; Jimmy Giannos; Dominic Jordan; Daen Simmons; Jason Boyd	The Audibles; Mr. Pyro; Eminem^{[a]}	3:54
4.	"Hard White (Up in the Club)" (featuring Lil Jon)	Atha; Lowell Grant; Michael Anthony Jackson; Alex Cartagena; Jonathan Smith	Tha Hydrox	3:23
5.	"Growin' Up in the Gutter" (featuring Rittz)	Atha; Washington; Jonathan McCullom	WLPWR	3:40
6.	"Throw It Up" (featuring Gangsta Boo & Eminem)	Atha; Washington; Lola Mitchell; Marshall Mathers	WLPWR; Eminem^{[b]}	4:54
7.	"Good Girl" (featuring Poo Bear)	Atha; Giannos; Jordan; Boyd; Kawan Prather; Courtney Sills	The Audibles; Poo Bear^{[a]}	4:24
8.	"Made in the U.S.A" (featuring Priscilla Renea)	Atha; Emanuel Kiriakou; Courtney Dwight; Priscilla Hamilton	Kiriakou; BLAQSMURPH^{[a]}	3:28
9.	"Animal" (featuring Fefe Dobson)	Atha; Asaf Borger; Thomas Pentz; Felicia Dobson; Nikkiya Brooks	Diplo; Borgore	3:42
10.	"The Hardest Love Song in the World"	Atha; Washington; Boyd; Prather; Bobby Miller	WLPWR	2:59
11.	"Write Your Name" (featuring Mona Moua)	Atha; Erik Ortiz; Kevin Crowe; Kenny Bartolomei; Gabriella Anna Cihumsky; Chasity Nwagbara; Ulloma Nwagbara; Rosalind Harrell; W. Smith	J.U.S.T.I.C.E. League	3:44
12.	"Everything I Love the Most"	Atha; Washington; Boyd; William Martin Joel	WLPWR; Eminem^{[b]}	4:05
13.	"Radio"	Atha; James Scheffer; Danny Morris; Michael Mule; Isaac de Boni	Jim Jonsin	5:32
14.	"Slumerican Shitizen" (featuring Killer Mike)	Atha; Washington; Michael Render; B. Parks	WLPWR	3:36
15.	"The Last Song"	Atha; Washington	WLPWR	3:41

Best Buy deluxe edition (bonus tracks)
No.	Title	Writer(s)	Producer(s)	Length
16.	"Whip It"	Atha; Giannos; Jordan; Boyd; Sills	The Audibles	4:04
17.	"I See You"	Atha; Washington; Giannos; Jordan; Sasha Sirota; Boyd; Prather	WLPWR; The Audibles^{[a]}; Sirota^{[a]}	3:54
18.	"In This World"	Atha; Washington; Mathers; Boyd; Prather; Paul Zaza; Trevor Dandy	WLPWR; Eminem^{[a]}	4:03

Notes

- ^{^a} signifies a co-producer
- ^{^b} signifies an additional producer
- "Radioactive Introduction" features background vocals by Nikkiya.
- "Let's Roll" features background vocals by Herschel Boone.
- "The Hardest Love Song in the World" features uncredited vocals by Poo Bear.
- "Radio" features uncredited vocals by Danny Morris.
- "In This World" features uncredited vocals by Eminem.

Sample credits

- "Get Away" contains elements of "Strawberry Letter 23", written by Shuggie Otis, and samples of the same performed by The Brothers Johnson.
- "The Hardest Love Song in the World" contains elements of "Always Together", written by Bobby Miller, and samples of the same performed by The Dells.
- "Everything I Love The Most" contains elements of "The Stranger", written and performed by Billy Joel.
- "In This World" contains elements of "Is There Any Love", written by Paul Zaza and Trevor Dandy, and samples of the same performed by Trevor Dandy.

== Personnel ==
Credits for Radioactive adapted from AllMusic.

- Ray Alba – publicity
- The Audibles – producer
- Matt Barrett – guitar
- Blaqsmurph – drums, keyboard programming, piano, producer
- Herschel Boone – background vocals
- Borgore – producer, programming
- Leslie Brathwaite – mixing
- Tyler Clinton – cover art
- Regina Davenport – A&R, production coordination
- Archie Davis – A&R
- Cristian DeLano – engineer
- Lionel Deluy – photography
- Ben Didelot – bass
- Diplo – producer, programming
- Fefe Dobson – composer
- Seneca Doss – marketing
- Eminem – additional production, executive producer, mixing, producer, vocal
- Finatik – percussion
- Finatik N Zac – programming
- John Fisher – management
- Brian "Big Bass" Gardner – mastering
- Jimmy Giannos – drum programming, programming
- Matthew Hayes – engineer, mixing
- Matt Huber – assistant
- Joe Strange – mixing assistant
- Irvin Johnson – assistant
- Jeremy "J Dot" Jones – management
- Jim Jonsin – percussion, producer, programming
- Dominic Jordan – drum programming, keyboards, programming
- J.U.S.T.I.C.E. League – producer, programming
- David Karmiol – guitar
- Emanuel Kiriakou – bass, drums, editing, engineer, keyboard programming, producer
- Dave Kutch – mastering
- Marc Labelle – project coordinator
- Robert Marks – mixing
- Nikolas Marzouca – engineer
- Marshall Mathers – composer
- Tristan McClain – engineer
- Riggs Morales – A&R
- Danny Morris – composer, keyboards
- Mona Moua – vocals
- Mr. Pyro – producer
- Brian Nelson – watercolor artwork
- Nikkiya Brooks – background vocals
- T.W. Pentz – composer
- Phonix Beats – engineer, producer, programming
- Poo Bear – producer
- Kawan "KP" Prather – A&R, composer, executive producer
- Michael Pratt – assistant
- Priscilla Renea – vocals
- Luis Resto – keyboards
- Courtney Sills – composer, management
- Sasha Sirota – bass, editing, drums, engineer, producer, guitar
- Muzzy Solis – assistant
- Mike Strange – engineer, mixing, mixing engineer
- Al Sutton – engineer
- Tha Hydrox – instrumentation, producer, programming
- Andrew Van Meter – producer
- Eric Weaver – assistant
- Jason Wilkie – engineer
- WLPWR – assistant, drum programming, instrumentation, producer, programming
- Jason Wilson – assistant
- Mike Wilson – engineer
- Yelawolf – vocals
- David Sammon – Yelawolf's Father
- Salvatore Casto – close friend

== Charts ==
=== Weekly charts ===
Weekly chart performance for Radioactive
Chart (2011)	Peak position
Canadian Albums (Nielsen SoundScan)	34
Swiss Albums (Schweizer Hitparade)	91
UK Albums (Official Charts)	169
UK R&B Albums (Official Charts)	20
US Billboard 200	27
US Top R&B/Hip-Hop Albums (Billboard)	6
US Top Rap Albums (Billboard)	4
US Top Tastemaker Albums (Billboard)	20

=== Year-end charts ===
Year-end chart performance for Radioactive
Chart (2012)	Position
US Top R&B/Hip-Hop Albums (Billboard)	41
