= Heart of Dixie (mixtape) =

Mixtape by Yelawolf
- Released: July 4, 2012
- Recorded: 2012
- Genre: Hip-hop
- Label: Slumerican
- Producer: M16

Yelawolf chronology
The Slumdon Bridge (2012)	Heart of Dixie (2012)	Psycho White (2012)

Singles from Heart of Dixie
- 1. "Father's Day" Released: June 16, 2012

Heart of Dixie is the fifth mixtape by American rapper Yelawolf. It was released on July 4, 2012, as a free download from LiveMixtapes and DatPiff.com.

This mixtape sees Yelawolf reverting to his original style, as seen in his previous mixtapes. The mixtape was hosted by DJ Frank White and was entirely produced by M16. Incidentally, all three artists are from Alabama, which further coincides with the recurring theme of hometown pride in Yelawolf's music.

== Track listing ==
No.	Title	Producer(s)	Length
1.	"Howdy"	M16	3:52
2.	"Let Me Out"	M16	3:58
3.	"Be the One"	M16	5:52
4.	"Big Nutz"	M16	3:07
5.	"White Boy Shit"	M16	4:43
6.	"Fuck Me"	M16	4:42
7.	"Sobriety Sucks"	M16	4:15
8.	"Out My Face" (featuring Shawty Fatt & Rittz)	M16	3:56
9.	"Father's Day"	M16	3:36
10.	"Wrap Song"	M16	3:07
