= DGC Records =

American record label

- Parent company: Universal Music Group
- Founded: 1990; 36 years ago 2007; 19 years ago (relaunch)
- Founder: David Geffen
- Defunct: 1999 (original); 2021 (relaunch)
- Status: Inactive
- Distributors: Interscope Geffen A&M Records (United States); Polydor Records (United Kingdom)
- Genre: Various; general focus on rock
- Country of origin: United States
- Location: Santa Monica, California
- Official website: www.dgcrecords.com (redirects to Interscope Geffen A&M Records's website)

DGC Records (an initialism for the David Geffen Company) was an American record label that operated as a division of Interscope Geffen A&M Records, which is owned by Universal Music Group.

In 1999, after the PolyGram merger into UMG which created the Interscope Geffen A&M unit, DGC was absorbed into Geffen Records, but was later revived in 2007 before being merged into Geffen again in September 2021 following eight years of inactivity.

The most famous group they signed was Nirvana.

== History ==
DGC Records (The 'DGC' portion of the name was then known as the David Geffen Company) was launched in 1990 by David Geffen as a subsidiary label of Geffen Records and was distributed by Warner Bros. Records until 1991, when it was acquired by MCA Music Entertainment Group, a division of MCA Inc. The label was created as a response to the success Geffen had with the harder rock acts on its roster. Though it initially focused on more progressive rock and heavy metal, as the decade progressed it also embraced the emergence of (and become a seminal label of) alternative rock, with influential acts like Nirvana, Sonic Youth, Hole, Weezer and Beck. The label also released early titles by Philadelphia alternative hip-hop band the Roots.

In 1994, Nirvana, which became one of DGC's most promising sources of revenue following the release of their 1991 album Nevermind, would disband. In 1995, David Geffen would leave Geffen Records to help form DreamWorks SKG (later DreamWorks Pictures) with Steven Spielberg and Jeffrey Katzenberg. In 1996, a year after Matsushita Corporation (now Panasonic) sold off 80% of MCA Inc. to Canadian distillery and media conglomerate Seagram, the company name was reincorporated as Universal Studios, Inc. (later doing business as Universal Pictures). Even so, MCA Music Entertainment also rebranded as Universal Music Group. DGC, and its sister labels, Geffen, Interscope Records, DreamWorks Records, MCA Records, Universal Records and Republic Records, would now operate under the new music company name. However, despite the parent company name changing, chances of DGC performing as a label proved less fruitful as its record sales started to see a small 19% decrease in the first quarter of 1997.

On December 10, 1998, Seagram completed its seven-month $10.6 billion plan to acquire PolyGram, merging its music division's operations into Universal Music. Following so, on time for New Year's Day 1999, UMG combined the operations of Interscope, Geffen and now-inactive sister label A&M Records into Interscope Geffen A&M Records, a newly formed one out of the four label groups under UMG (the other three being the Verve Label Group, Universal Motown Republic Group and the Island Def Jam Music Group). DGC would have been a sister label to newly acquired A&M, Island Records, Def Jam Recordings, Mercury Records and Motown (which had previously been a part of UMG during its preceding MCA era from 1988 to 1991), but later in 1999, the label's operations were folded into Geffen Records, as was A&M (which itself would be absorbed into Geffen's parenting label, Interscope). The retained acts went on to record for the main Geffen imprint. However, Beck and Sonic Youth would remain recording for DGC until August 2003, during a reorganization at IGA, which finally fulfilled both acts' involvement with the imprint when they altogether would finally be drafted into Geffen, effectively ending the label name, at the same time as MCA and DreamWorks Records being absorbed into the label as well, expanding Geffen's artist roster.

In the years to follow, the DGC title and logo occasionally appeared on reissues of its past catalog items, maintained by UMG's catalogue remaster label Universal Music Enterprises.

In 2007, the label was revived as a brand for both Geffen and Interscope Records, inheriting many alternative acts signed to Interscope Geffen A&M (including acts that previously recorded for either Geffen, MCA or DreamWorks Records). Throughout its revival, it released albums by Weezer, Beck, Counting Crows, Papa Roach, AFI and Rise Against. In 2008, DGC, in partnership with MySpace Records, signed Los Angeles-based artist Meiko (through indie label Lucky Ear Music) and alternative indie singer-songwriter Kate Voegele.

In 2009, Blink-182 and Alabama rapper Yelawolf also joined the imprint. Albums releases followed: Blink-182's Neighborhoods (2011), Yelawolf's EP, Trunk Muzik 0-60 (2010), and his sophomore studio album, Radioactive (released in conjunction with Kawan Prather's Ghet-O-Vision and Eminem's Shady Records on November 21, 2011). All three projects managed to receive critical praise and commercial success.

In December 2010, Luke Wood stepped down as president of the label. After five years under Geffen, Compton rapper The Game resigned with Interscope through DGC. On August 22, 2011, his fourth studio album, The R.E.D. Album, was released under the imprint. Despite mixed reception, it debuted at number one on the Billboard 200. After releasing his fifth follow-up, Jesus Piece, in December 2012, Game parted ways with DGC and ended his relationship with Interscope. As a result, and without an artist on its own roster, the label went inactive in 2013. However, DGC as an imprint and name managed to hold copyrights for reissues of catalogue releases under UMe for the time being.

On September 27, 2021, following its eight years of hibernation, DGC Records was permanently merged into Geffen Records, once again ending the label's operations and name. The remains of DGC's artist roster and catalogue releases were to be transferred to Geffen following its merger and later closure. The last of what was the imprint is now under the corporate control of Universal Music's Interscope Geffen A&M division.

To date, the best-selling album in the DGC catalog is Nevermind, the 1991 album by Nirvana, reaching international sales of 25 million copies worldwide, with ten million copies sold in the United States, and was one of the first albums on the label to be RIAA–certified diamond.

== Artists prior to 2021 closure ==
The following artists have recorded for DGC Records:

- The All-American Rejects
- All Time Low
- Arc Angels
- Murray Attaway
- Beck
- Bivouac
- Black Lab
- Black Tide
- Blink-182
- Boss Hog
- Brand New
- The Candyskins
- Cell
- Ceremony
- Toni Childs
- Ciccone Youth
- Coldplay
- Counting Crows
- Rivers Cuomo
- Dashboard Confessional
- D.O.E.
- Drivin' N' Cryin'
- Elastica
- Embrace
- Enter Shikari
- Escape the Fate
- Fluorescein
- The Freewheelers
- froSTed
- Galactic Cowboys
- Game
- Girls Against Boys
- Gutterboy
- Ted Hawkins
- Harvester (American band)
- Hog
- Hole
- Hunk
- Jasper and the Prodigal Sons
- Jawbreaker
- Jimmy Eat World
- King of Kings
- Klaxons
- Linoleum
- Little Caesar
- Loud Lucy
- Aimee Mann
- Meiko
- Thurston Moore
- Nelson
- Nirvana
- Papa Roach
- Pell Mell
- Pere Ubu
- Pitchshifter
- The Posies
- Queens of the Stone Age
- The Raincoats
- Remy Zero
- Rev Theory
- Rise Against
- Tyson Ritter
- Kane Roberts
- The Roots
- St. Johnny
- Sammy
- 60 Ft. Dolls
- Skiploader
- Sloan
- Slowpoke
- Sonic Youth
- Southern Culture on the Skids
- Street Drum Corps
- The Sugarplastic
- Sugartooth
- The Sundays
- Switches
- that dog.
- Teenage Fanclub
- Terri Nunn
- Them Crooked Vultures
- TV on the Radio
- Urge Overkill
- Veruca Salt
- Kate Voegele
- Billy Joe Walker Jr.
- Warrior Soul
- Weezer
- White Zombie
- Wild Colonials
- Wolfmother
- Yeah Yeah Yeahs
- Yelawolf
- Rob Zombie

== See also ==
- List of record labels
- DGC Rarities Vol. 1
- Interscope Geffen A&M Records
