= Caskey (rapper) =

American rapper from Florida

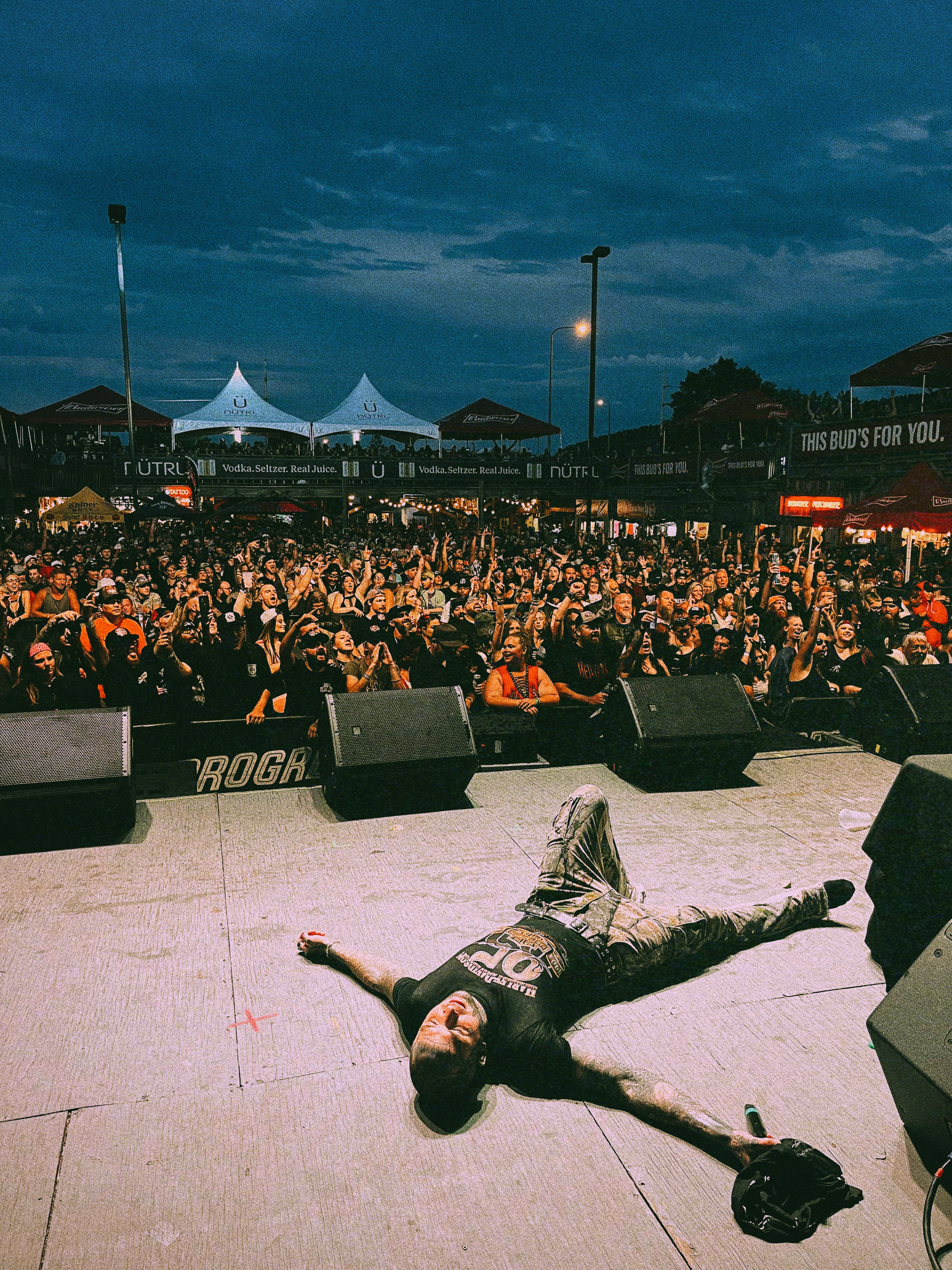
- Caskey performing at Sturgis in 2023

Background information
- Born: Brandon Robert Caskey; August 28, 1992 (age 33)
- Origin: Orlando, Florida, U.S.
- Genres: Hip hop; trap; Southern hip hop
- Occupation: Rapper
- Years active: 2008–present
- Labels: Black Sheep; Cash Money; Republic
- Website: bakingwithcaskey.com

Brandon Robert Caskey (born August 28, 1992), better known by the mononym Caskey, is an American rapper from Winter Springs, Florida. After years of independent releases, Caskey signed with Birdman's Cash Money Records, an imprint of Republic Records in August 2012 and made his first mainstream appearance on the label's compilation album, Rich Gang (2013). He was notably the first and only Caucasian rapper to be signed to the label.

As a solo artist, he gained his furthest attention for his 2015 mixtape Black Sheep 2, which was met with critical praise. He parted ways with Cash Money in 2020 and released the collaborative album Yelawolf Black Sheep with Alabama rapper Yelawolf the following year. Since departing the label, he has released four independent studio albums.

== Early life ==
At a young age, Caskey would listen to heavy metal. However, his older sister got him interested in rap groups such as N.W.A, and Three 6 Mafia in his elementary school years. Shortly after, he started listening to rappers such as Nas, Eminem, and Dead Prez heavily.

== Musical career ==
=== 2010–2012: Beginnings and signing with Cash Money ===
Throughout his childhood, Caskey would write other genres of music, and eventually began writing raps in his sophomore year at Winter Springs High School. Then in his early years, he released two underground mixtapes, Blowin' Out My Mind Vol. 1 and The Intangibles. While recording his third official mixtape Homegrown he linked up with Orlando, Florida-based production team The Avengerz. A few weeks prior to its release he was in a motorcycle accident, where he suffered pinched nerves in his left arm. On April 20, 2011, Caskey released Homegrown as a free download.

In August 2012, Caskey released his fourth official mixtape titled No Complaints, which was produced by The Avengerz. The mixtape would be heard by Cash Money Records producer DJ Nasty, who would pass it on to CEO Birdman. Upon hearing it and meeting with Caskey, Birdman said he immediately knew he was a star. In early August 2012, Cash Money Records released a video of Caskey officially signing to the label. The video also revealed that his debut studio album would be released in the following year. Upon signing he said: "I’ve wanted to be a performer my whole life, so signing with Cash Money Records and having this platform to release my music has been a dream. I greatly respect Birdman, Slim and the YMCMB family. I look forward to making the city of Orlando, my fans and my label proud." To celebrate he released "Cash Money Records 100 Bars" on September 13.

=== 2012–present: The Transient Classics, Black Sheep 2, Yelawolf Blacksheep and This Isn't Even My Final Form ===
On December 8, 2012, he released his debut single "Keep It on the Low" featuring Kyle Denmead from the No Complaints mixtape. He had a solo track titled "FBGM" on the YMCMB mixtape Rich Gang: All Stars, which was released on February 18, 2013. Then on February 25, 2013, Cash Money re-released No Complaints with two bonus tracks. He was featured on the Cash Money Records compilation album Rich Gang, on the song "Sunshine" also featuring Birdman, Limp Bizkit and Flo Rida. Artistdirect would call the song one of the album's standout tracks.

On June 24, 2013, Caskey announced that his upcoming mixtape would be titled The Transient Classics. On July 16, he revealed the cover art for The Transient Classics and announced it would be released on his 21 birthday, August 28, 2013. On August 20, 2013, he released the music video for the song "Show Me Some", which was shot in Paris, France. The mixtape was produced by The Avengerz, Myles William and The Colleagues and featured guest appearances from Trae tha Truth, Machine Gun Kelly, Riff Raff, JellyRoll, Rittz, and others. Upon its release it was met with positive reviews from music critics. His debut album was recorded at The Hit Factory in Miami, its release was and debuted on 2014. On April 14, 2015, Caskey released a mixtape titled "The Lost Files." On September 7, 2015 Caskey released an album titled Black Sheep 2 with production primarily by Anonymass. It would go on to become one of his most acclaimed projects. He would then follow up with Black Sheep 3, Generation, Speak of the Devil, Music to Die To, Black Sheep 4, Clockwork, Viral, the latter featuring one of his most streamed songs "Martial Law". He secured his first number one on the iTunes Hip Hop charts with his album This Isn't Even My Final Form (2019). His third album was released in December 2022 titled While You Wait for J.A.W.S., which secured another number one on the iTunes Hip Hop chart. Caskey has since released the singles "I'm a Virgin" and "Firestarter", also produced by Anonymass.

== Personal life ==
His father died by suicide when Caskey was sixteen years old. Caskey has written tribute songs "Letter to My Father" and "Been Solid" on the No Complaints mixtape as well as "Holding on to a Gun" from the While You Wait For J.A.W.S. mixtape. He has created a unique approach to gritty hip hop while embracing pain as a gift. He attributes overcoming adversity in life to his success and being able to connect with his fans on a deeper level.

== Discography ==
=== Studio albums ===
List of studio albums, with year released
Title	Album details
Fine Art	Released: May 21, 2021; Label: Black Sheep Records; Format: Digital download, streaming
Nobody.	Released: April 29, 2022; Label: Black Sheep Records; Format: Digital download, streaming
This Isn't Even My Final Form	Released: July 1, 2022; Label: Black Sheep Records; Format: Digital download, streaming
While You Wait For J.A.W.S.	Released: December 23, 2022; Label: Black Sheep Records; Format: Digital download, streaming
Cadillac Music	Released: October 13, 2023; Label: Black Sheep Records; Format: Digital download, streaming

=== Collaborative albums ===
List of collaborative albums, with year released
Title	Album details
Yelawolf Blacksheep (with Yelawolf)	Released: February 19, 2021; Label: Black Sheep Records, Slumerican; Format: Digital download, streaming

=== Compilation albums ===
List of compilation albums, with year released
Title	Album details
Rich Gang (with Rich Gang)	Released: July 23, 2013; Label: Young Money, Cash Money, Republic; Format: CD Digital download

=== Mixtapes ===
List of mixtapes
Title	Album details
Blowin' Out My Mind	Released: 2008; Label: Self-released; Formats: CD
The Intangibles	Released: 2010; Label: Self-released; Formats: CD
Homegrown	Released: April 20, 2011; Label: Self-released; Formats: Digital download
No Complaints	Released: August 19, 2012; Label: Re-released under Cash Money Records; Formats: Digital download
The Transient Classics	Released: August 28, 2013; Label: Money Mack Music, Cash Money Records; Formats: Digital download
Black Sheep	Released: November 11, 2014; Label: Money Mack Music, Cash Money Records; Formats: Digital download
The Lost Files	Released: April 14, 2015; Label: Money Mack Music, Cash Money Records; Formats: Digital download
Black Sheep 2	Released: September 7, 2015; Label: Money Mack Music, Cash Money Records; Formats: Digital download
Black Sheep 3	Released: February 9, 2016; Label: Money Mack Music, Cash Money Records; Formats: Digital download
Wish U Were Here	Released: February 14, 2016; Label: Money Mack Music, Cash Money Records; Formats: Digital download
No Apologies	Released: September 16, 2016; Label: Money Mack Music, Cash Money Records; Formats: Digital download
Generation	Released: August 1, 2017; Label: Money Mack Music, Cash Money Records; Formats: Digital download
Speak Of The Devil	Released: January 2, 2018; Label: Black Sheep Records; Formats: Digital download
Music to Die To	Released: July 4, 2018; Label: Black Sheep Records; Formats: Digital download
Black Sheep 4	Released: April 12, 2019; Label: Cash Money Records; Formats: Digital download
Clockwork	Released: October 30, 2019; Label: Cash Money Records; Format: Digital download
Viral	Released: March 31, 2020; Label: Cash Money Records; Format: Digital download
I Changed	Released: September 5, 2020; Label: Black Sheep Records; Format: Digital downloads
$100 Mixtape	Released: August 28, 2021; Label: Black Sheep Records; Format: Physical formats CD and USB
