= Yelawolf =

American rapper (born 1979)

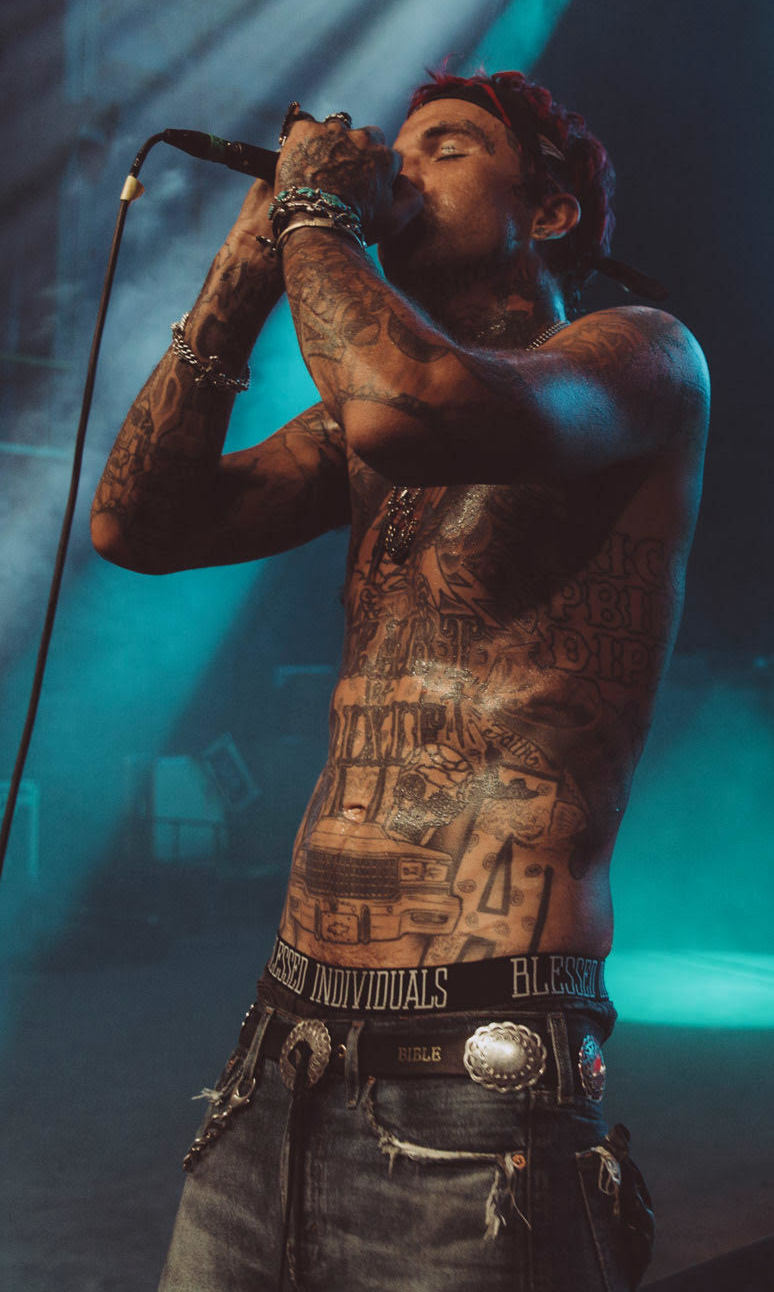
- Yelawolf performing at Slumfest 2019

Background information
- Also known as: Catfish Billy
- Born: Michael Wayne Atha; December 30, 1979 (age 46); Gadsden, Alabama, U.S.
- Origin: Antioch, Tennessee, U.S.
- Genres: Hip-hop; rap rock; country rap; Southern rock
- Occupations: Rapper; singer; songwriter; record producer
- Works: Yelawolf discography
- Years active: 2005–present
- Labels: Slumerican; Shady; Interscope; DGC; Ghet-O-Vision; Columbia
- Spouse: Fefe Dobson (m. 2019)
- Children: 3
- Website: yelawolf.com

Michael Wayne Atha (born December 30, 1979), better known by his stage name Yelawolf, is an American rapper, singer, songwriter, and record producer. Born in Gadsden, Alabama, and raised in Antioch, Tennessee, he embarked on his recording career in 2005, releasing four mixtapes to positive local reception. His fourth mixtape, Trunk Muzik (2010), earned him wider recognition and led him to sign a recording contract with Interscope Records. He re-worked the mixtape into his first major label release, Trunk Muzik 0-60 (2010).

He entered a joint venture deal with Eminem's Shady Records to release his second studio album, Radioactive (2011), which peaked at number 27 on the Billboard 200. His third album, Love Story (2015) peaked at number three on the chart and spawned the single "Till It's Gone", which received platinum certification by the Recording Industry Association of America (RIAA). His fourth and fifth albums, Trial by Fire (2017) and Trunk Muzik 3 (2019), both saw moderate commercial performance and critical praise; his sixth album, Ghetto Cowboy (2019), served as his first independent release following his major label departure.

== Early life ==
Michael Wayne Atha was born on December 30, 1979, in Gadsden, Alabama. He has described himself as "[representing] the people that are the core of America". Yelawolf said his stage name was inspired by his father. Throughout childhood, Atha moved often. He spent much of his time in Antioch, Tennessee, and attended Carter Lawrence Middle School in Nashville, which is located near the Edgehill Homes apartment projects. He says that during that time, "hip-hop started making sense to me. That's where hip-hop made sense culturally."

Regarding his stage name and persona, Yelawolf has said that his father is Cherokee, but also that he's "always been … just white." He says he constructed the name "Yelawolf" from the word "Yela" (which Atha claims is Cherokee for "sun") (Note: The word "Yela" does not exist in the Cherokee language. See the Cherokee Dictionary and the Cherokee word list at the official site of the Cherokee Nation, to look up the actual Cherokee word for "sun".) and the English word "wolf" because it "represents the duality between his intellectual 'light' side... and his aggressive, survivalist 'dark' side."

== Career ==
=== 2005–2009: Early career ===
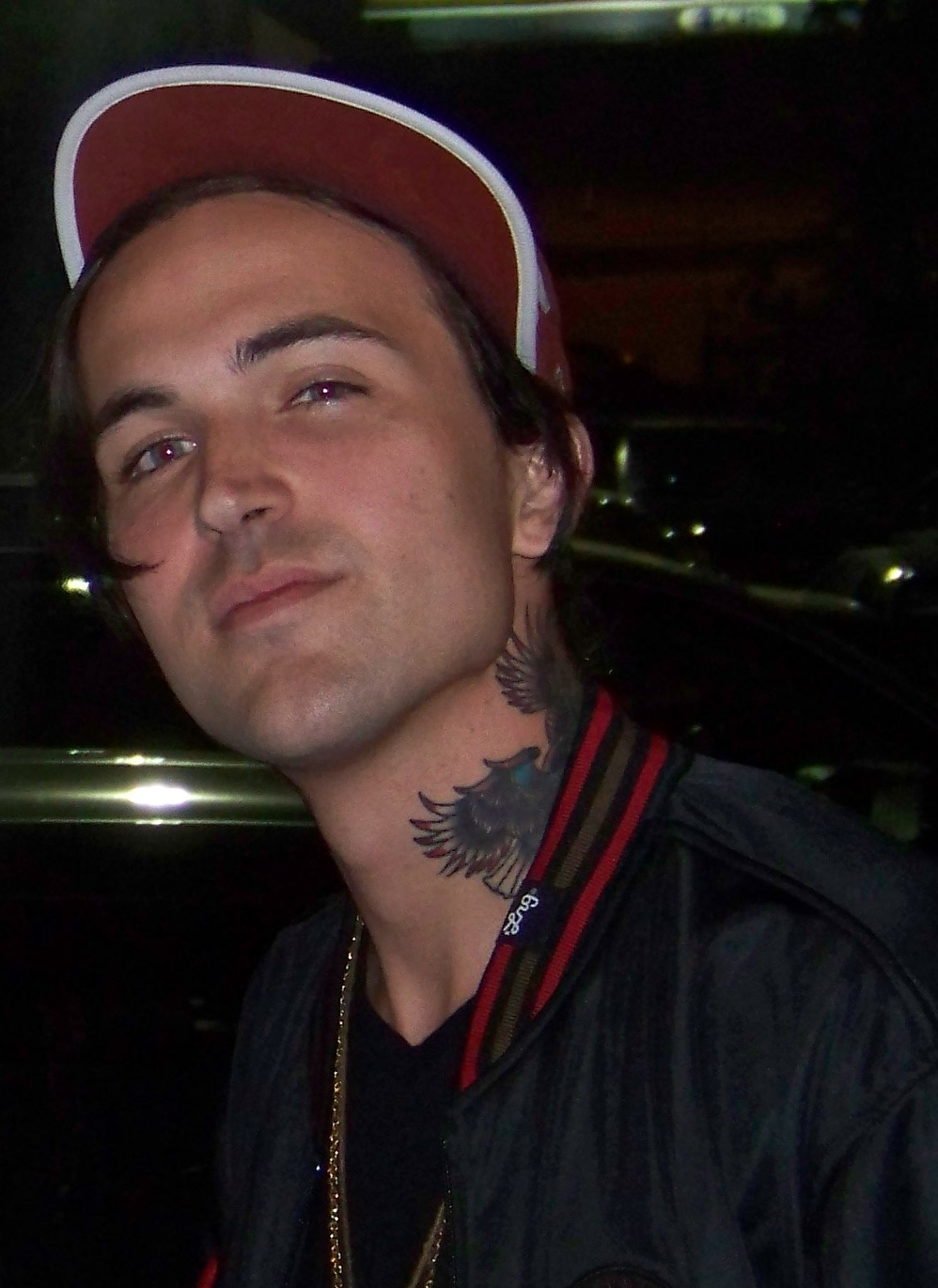
Yelawolf in 2008

In 2005, Yelawolf appeared as one of 13 contestants on the UPN Network reality series The Road to Stardom with Missy Elliott. After his shocking elimination from the show (he was the third contestant to be sent home), he released his independent debut album Creekwater in 2005; later the same year, he released his debut mixtape Pissin' in a Barrel of Beez. Two years later, Yelawolf signed to Columbia Records and released the single "Kickin'" from the album Fearin' and Loathin' in Smalltown, U.S.A.. The album was never released, and Yelawolf was dropped from the label later that year. Yelawolf released two mixtapes following his release from Columbia, titled Ball of Flames: The Ballad of Slick Rick E. Bobby and Stereo: A Hip Hop Tribute to Classic Rock, both of which went mainly unnoticed, although Stereo is often mentioned by fans as some of his best work. In 2009, he signed with Ghet-O-Vision Entertainment and released his debut extended play Arena Rap.

=== 2009–2011: Trunk Muzik and Radioactive ===
In 2009, he began to work with Ghet-O-Vision producer, WLPWR, on his 2009 breakthrough mixtape titled Trunk Muzik. Released in January 2010, the mixtape created a substantial online following for Yelawolf. Later that year, Yelawolf signed a major record deal with Interscope Records, and began to work on a re-release of the project, titled Trunk Muzik 0-60. It was released on November 22, 2010, under Ghet-O-Vision Entertainment and Interscope Records, which became his most acclaimed work at that time. In 2010 and 2011, he raised his profile by making guest appearances on albums by rappers Big Boi, Paul Wall, Tech N9ne, Travis Barker, Gucci Mane, and Big K.R.I.T., among others.

In March 2011, after speculation of a joint record deal with Eminem, Yelawolf was featured on the cover of XXL's March 2011 issue, with Eminem and fellow new Shady Records signees Slaughterhouse, with the issue confirming his record deal with Shady Records. Yelawolf was also featured among the XXL's Top 11 Freshmen of 2011, releasing several songs on the magazine's yearly Freshman mixtape, along with Kendrick Lamar, Cyhi Da Prynce and Big K.R.I.T., among others. On April 14, 2011, Yelawolf announced the title of his debut Shady release Radioactive with a release date that aimed for September. On May 18, Yelawolf announced his album's first single, titled "Gangsta of Love", produced by Jim Jonsin and featuring Cyhi Da Prynce. The song was leaked in early July, although it only featured unfinished vocals by Cyhi da Prynce at the end of the song. The song was later scrapped and no longer appeared on the album. Yelawolf partnered up with the video game Driver: San Francisco to release a music video for the song "No Hands" which was supposed to be included in Radioactive, but was later scrapped. On August 8, 2011, Yelawolf released the first official single from his album, titled "Hard White (Up in the Club)", which features guest vocals from Southern hip-hop producer Lil Jon. The album's release date was moved down to October 2011, and later had a final release date to November 21, 2011. On October 30, 2011, Yelawolf released the second single off Radioactive, titled "Let's Roll", featuring guest vocals from Kid Rock.

Anticipation for the album increased when hip-hop magazine The Source gave the album a rare 4.5 out of 5 mics, meaning the album was "near classic". Radioactive was released November 21, 2011, under Interscope Records and Shady Records, debuting the following week at No. 13 on the Billboard 200. The album featured production from Eminem (who is also the executive producer for the album), Jim Jonsin, J.U.S.T.I.C.E. League, Diplo, The Audibles, Pooh Bear and WLPWR of SupaHotBeats, and features from Eminem, Kid Rock, Lil Jon, Fefe Dobson, Mystikal, Shawty Fatt, Rittz, Killer Mike, and Gangsta Boo among others.

=== 2012: The Slumdon Bridge, Heart of Dixie, Dogs Eating Dogs, and Psycho White ===
On January 24, 2012, Yelawolf released a promotional track with British singer Ed Sheeran titled "You Don't Know (For Fuck's Sake)". The track was for an upcoming collaborative extended play (EP), titled The Slumdon Bridge. On January 31, 2012, a trailer for the EP was released, featuring both artists in a studio recording the EP. In the video Yelawolf revealed the EP was recorded in 10 hours, and included 4 tracks.The Slumdon Bridge, which was released as a free download on Valentine's Day, February 14, 2012, marking Yelawolf's second EP, and his first collaborative project.

On June 16, 2012, to commemorate Father's Day, Yelawolf released a song titled "Happy Father's Day", produced by Alabama producer M16. With the track, Yelawolf announced his fifth official mixtape Heart of Dixie.

In August 2012, Yelawolf announced the long-awaited joint EP with Blink-182 drummer Travis Barker, titled Psycho White. The EP's lead single, titled "Push 'Em", features background vocals by Transplants members Skinhead Rob and Tim Armstrong, and was released as a free download on September 12. After several push-backs, the EP was finally released on November 13, 2012, debuting at No. 24 on the Billboard 200 with first week sales of 15,000. Yelawolf stated that all the tracks on the album will have a music video and during an article with Rolling Stone, both he and Barker hinted at a sequel to the EP.

In December 2012, the EP Dogs Eating Dogs by Blink-182 was released, with the song "Pretty Little Girl" featuring vocals by Yelawolf.

=== 2012–2015: Trunk Muzik Returns and Love Story ===
On March 20, 2012, Yelawolf announced that recording sessions for his third studio album began in June 2012, titled Love Story. Due to a stage diving incident which caused a ruptured spleen, Yelawolf decided to delay the album's recording process. During an interview with DJ Skee, he revealed that a sequel to his 2010's mixtape Trunk Muzik, titled Trunk Muzik Returns, would be released in August after "the dust settles on the Heart of Dixie" but was afterwards delayed. In December 2012, Yelawolf addressed the status of all of his projects in an interview. He also spoke on his upcoming second release, Love Story, and how it would be different compared to his debut effort Radioactive. "With Radioactive, I gave up a lot of creative space, and like I predicted would happen, there were some records that didn't translate to my audience." He stated he would record the album in Nashville and go to Detroit so he and Eminem could finish the album. Yelawolf also said that Trunk Muzik Returns would hopefully be released in February 2013, with the date later confirmed.

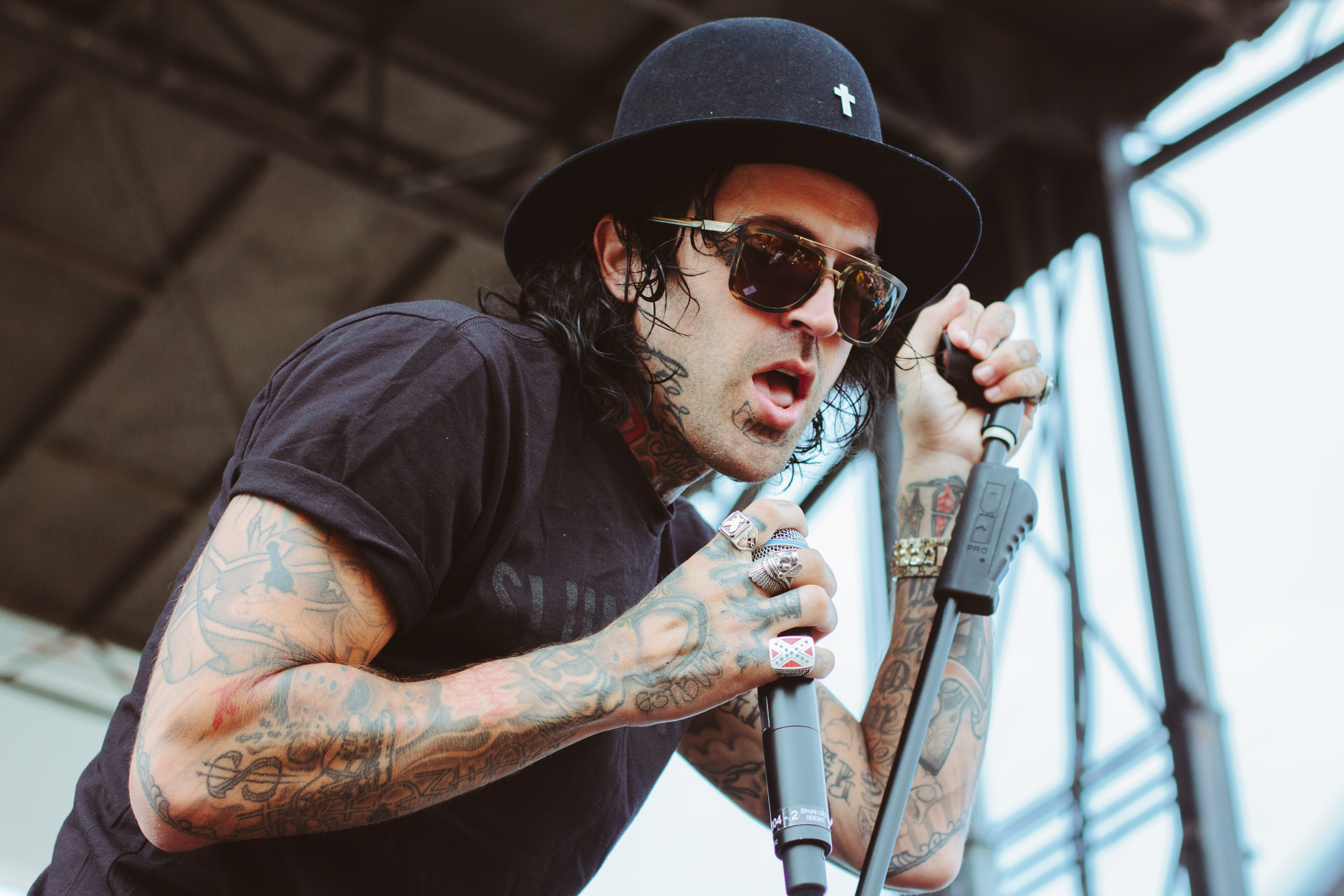
Yelawolf in 2014

On February 5, 2013, Yelawolf released the first song from Trunk Muzik Returns, "Way Out" and announced a release date of March 14, 2013, for the mixtape. On February 26 Yelawolf released a second song from Trunk Muzik Returns titled "F.A.S.T. Ride". On March 12 a third song from Trunk Muzik Returns was released titled "Gangster" featuring fellow rappers ASAP Rocky and Big Henry. The mixtape contains ten original tracks and features guest appearances from Raekwon, Paul Wall, Killer Mike, ASAP Rocky, and is entirely produced by his go-to producer WLPWR. On October 18, 2013, Yelawolf revealed that he would be releasing his seventh mixtape titled Black Fall on October 31, 2013. The project consisted of 5 tracks and was entirely produced by DJ Paul of Three 6 Mafia.

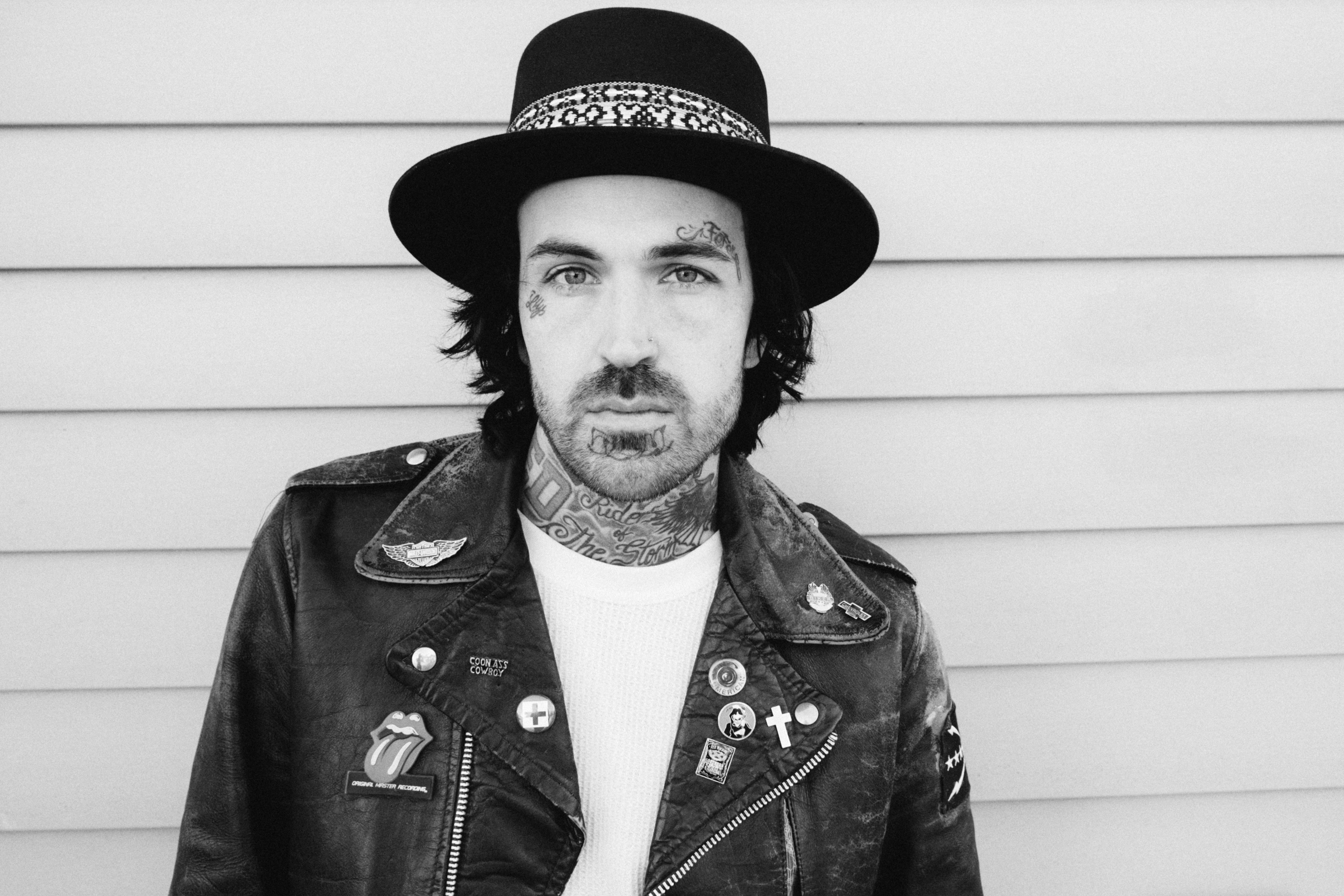
Yelawolf in 2015

On January 28, 2014, Yelawolf premiered his debut single from Love Story titled "Box Chevy V" on Shade 45. During the interview Yelawolf stated Love Story would be released in May 2014, however the album was delayed until April 2015. Between then, Yelawolf remained active promoting the album, releasing weekly freestyles that sampled rock classics such as Pink Floyd's "Money". and The Jimi Hendrix Experience's Voodoo Chile Yelawolf described the freestyles as a "mini-sequel" to his 2008 effort, Stereo, which also was heavily influenced by classic rock. In addition, Yelawolf also featured extensively on Eminem's compilation record Shady XV, which was released as a celebration of the label's 15-year anniversary.

Eminem is the only featured guest on Love Story and also serves as an executive producer alongside Yelawolf. This album also marks the first instance of Yelawolf as a record producer since his first independent 2005 album Creekwater and features "Till It's Gone", Yelawolf's most commercially successful song to date. The album debuted at No. 3 on the Billboard 200 with 61,000 copies sold in its first week. The album is considered Yelawolf's most celebrated release among his fan base, but was found to be polarizing with critics due to the mixture of country and hip-hop. Two singles from the album, "Till It's Gone" and "Best Friend,” (the later featuring Eminem) have amassed over 100 million views on YouTube, and eventually received platinum certifications from the RIAA. On June 8, 2018, Love Story also received a Gold certification for 500,000 units sold.

=== 2016–2017: Trial by Fire and Hotel ===
On August 25, 2015, Yelawolf was mired in controversy when he decided to defend the Confederate flag before reconsidering his stance and entirely rejecting the flag with a non-album track titled "To Whom It May Concern" on October 30, 2015. The single addressed his upbringings and his disgust with the Charleston church shooting, a racially motivated mass shooting. After the controversy was settled on September 22, 2015, Yelawolf announced his fourth studio album, Trial by Fire. He alluded to the record being much darker than its predecessor, and also being produced entirely by himself and constant collaborators DJ Klever and Bones Owens, which were also members of his tour band.

Towards the end of 2016, Yelawolf was seen working with South Florida-based producer and constant collaborator Jim Jonsin, although what they worked on remained a secret. October 10, 2016, the surprise free EP, Hotel was released. Hotel is an acronym for "House Of The Endless Life" with the production being entirely handled by Jonsin and Yelawolf.

The first two singles from Trial by Fire, "Daylight" and "Shadows" featuring country singer Joshua Headley were released in late 2016. In order to support Trial By Fire, a tour was announced on July 18, 2016, and was due to run from October 13 to December 4. However, during the Oregon show, Yelawolf was seen destroying equipment belonging to Bones Owens, which subsequently caused Owens to fallout with Yelawolf and quit the band indefinitely (DJ Klever also left the band but would reunite with Yelawolf the following year). The incident was followed by an altercation with a fan at the Sacramento show resulting in Yelawolf leaving the stage and cancelling the remaining seven dates. After the cancellation of the tour, Yelawolf seemed to suffer an apparent mental breakdown and was admitted to a mental ward. After his release towards the end of December, Yelawolf announced via social media that he was dropping the "Yelawolf" stage name in favor of his birth name, the removed Instagram post announced "I decided to sober up and rebrand my new music as Michael Wayne Atha MWA". This came as a result of the death of long-time friend and collaborator Shawty Fatt and his break-up with fiancé Fefe Dobson. During this time, Yelawolf also drastically changed his country style to a contemporary hip-hop image, before retreating from public life for over six months. During this period, the status of the unreleased Trial by Fire album and Yelawolf's involvement with Shady Records were left undetermined.

On June 6, 2017, Yelawolf announced a return to the music scene with the release of the third single for Trial by Fire titled "Row Your Boat", with his "Yelawolf" moniker once again in use. Yelawolf launched another tour to support the album titled the "51/50" tour, with the name alluding to the term police or doctors use towards patients that are an endangerment to themselves and others, referencing his mental breakdown from the previous year. During the tour, Yelawolf would re-visit all the venues that were cancelled during his previous tour, free of charge to those who had bought a ticket for the former. After multiple delays, Trial by Fire was finally released on October 27, 2017. During this time, he also reunited with long-time fiancé Fefe Dobson.

=== 2018–2021: Trunk Muzik 3 and Ghetto Cowboy ===
Trunk Muzik 3, the third major project in the Trunk Muzik series, was first hinted at in mid-2017, following Yelawolf's return to the music scene after a prolonged break. Three months after the October release of Trial By Fire, Yelawolf announced he had begun work on the project with long-time producer WLPWR, who also handled some of the production in 2010's Trunk Muzik and its re-release Trunk Muzik 0-60, as well as producing the entirety of the second entry in the series, Trunk Muzik Returns. The project also features production contributions from DJ Paul and Jim Jonsin. It was revealed that unlike the previous two Trunk Muzik projects, Trunk Muzik 3 would be his fifth studio album released under Shady Records. On July 27, Yelawolf began a 25-date tour to support the album. During the tour, he premiered the then-planned first single for the album titled "Catfish Billy (Part 2)", although it was later scrapped as lead single. During one of the shows, he announced that Trunk Muzik 3 would be his final album under Eminem's label Shady Records, and after its release.

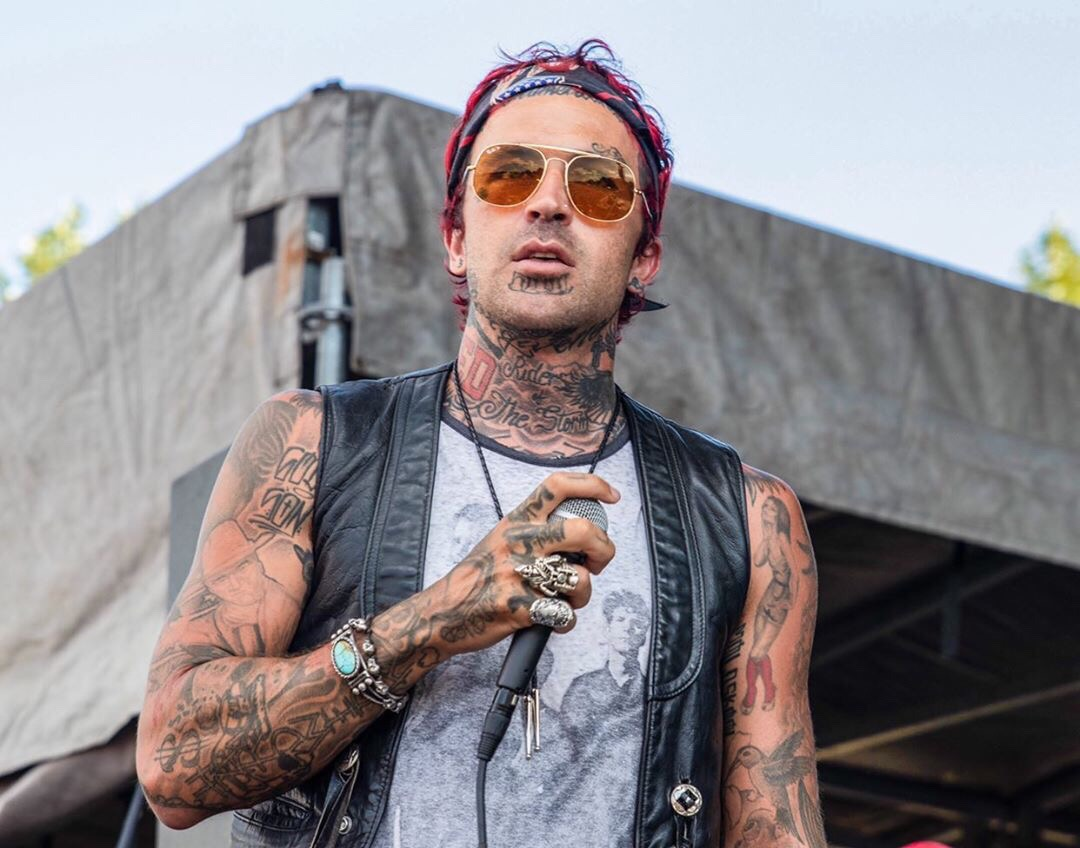
Yelawolf in 2019

The album features a collaboration from Machine Gun Kelly on the track titled "Rowdy", marking the end to a feud between Yelawolf and Machine Gun Kelly that began in 2011. The song gained further attention when it was mentioned in another publicized feud between Kelly and Eminem. On the diss track "Rap Devil", Machine Gun Kelly states "And don't be a sucker and take my verse off of Yelawolf's album, thank you". In anticipation for the release of the album, Yelawolf began a weekly freestyle series similar to the one leading up to his 2015 release Love Story, claiming he would "release a freestyle every week until the album comes out". The album was supported by the singles "TM3" featuring DJ Klever, and "Catfish Billy 2", a sequel to the song from Trunk Muzik Returns. The album was released on March 29, 2019, and features Caskey, Doobie, Rittz, DJ Paul, MopTop, and CookUpBoss.

Following the period between the completion of Trunk Muzik 3 and its release, Yelawolf hinted he was beginning work on his sixth studio album, titled Ghetto Cowboy. This would mark his first album to not be released under the Shady Records label, but instead under his own independent label, Slumerican. During this time, Yelawolf dyed his hair red, which he claims is homage to Opie Taylor, a character from The Andy Griffith Show. The first single from the record, titled "Unnatural Born Killer" was released on August 9, 2019. In late 2019, Yelawolf launched his second tour of the year in support of the album, appropriately titled "The Ghetto Cowboy Tour".

=== 2021–present: Yelawolf Blacksheep, TURQUOiSE TORNADO, Slumafia, Mile Zero and Mud Mouth ===
On February 19, 2021, Yelawolf released Yelawolf Blacksheep, an 11-track mixtape with fellow rapper Caskey. The first single from the record, titled "Been a Problem" was released on February 5, 2021.

In an Instagram post on March 23, 2021, Yelawolf revealed his upcoming April Onslaught event, in which the rapper announced four album releases in the month of April 2021, to be released weekly. In order, the releases were as follows:

- TURQUOiSE TORNADO, released April 9, 2021
- Slumafia, released April 16, 2021
- Mile Zero, released April 23, 2021
- Mud Mouth, released April 30, 2021

Of the four releases, only Mud Mouth was an official studio album, whereas TURQUOiSE TORNADO, Slumafia and Mile Zero were collaborative projects, made with fellow rappers Riff Raff, DJ Paul and DJ Muggs respectively.

To the surprise of his fans, on March 11, 2022, Yelawolf released a rock project "Sometimes Y" with Shooter Jennings, departing from his usual music style.

Although Mud Mouth was said to be his last rap album, Yelawolf returned to rap with a double-album War Story on June 7, 2024.

== Influences ==
Yelawolf's early introduction to hip-hop came as a result of his mother's boyfriend being a sound designer for Aerosmith around the time that the Run-DMC version of "Walk This Way" was released, and made friends with the trio. Yelawolf recalls Run-DMC visiting his childhood home and giving him some Beastie Boys' Licensed to Ill cassette tapes. He has cited Outkast as his biggest influence when it comes to a "blend of sounds". He has stated on multiple occasions that the group's two seminal albums, ATLiens and Aquemini, are among his favorite hip-hop records of all time. He has also shared that the hip-hop and R&B collective Dungeon Family has greatly influenced his production style, as well as Three 6 Mafia, J Dilla, Pete Rock, CL Smooth, Black Star, Hieroglyphics, and the Brooklyn-based trio Digable Planets.

Some of Yelawolf's other musical influences include Johnny Cash, Black Sabbath, Lynyrd Skynyrd, Kraftwerk, The Doors, Fleetwood Mac, Metallica, Portishead, N.W.A, and Eminem. Yelawolf has also shown appreciation for Detroit-based recording artist Kid Rock and his fusion of country music, rock music, and hip-hop,

Pro skaters Paul Rodriguez and Terry Kennedy appear in Yelawolf's official music video for "Good to Go" featuring Bun B.

== Slumerican ==
Slumerican
- Founded: 2012
- Founder: Yelawolf
- Distributor: ONErpm
- Genre: Hip-hop
- Country of origin: U.S.
- Location: Nashville, Tennessee
- Official website: slumerican.com

Slumerican is an American independent record label specializing in hip-hop. Founded in 2012 by Yelawolf, its roster includes DJ Paul of Three 6 Mafia, Bubba Sparxxx, and Rittz. The label also performs merchandising, with a flagship store currently operating in Nashville, Tennessee.

=== Discography ===
Artist	Album	Details
Yelawolf and DJ Paul	Black Fall (EP)	Released: October 31, 2013
Yelawolf	Love Story	Released: April 21, 2015
Bubba Sparxxx	The Bubba Mathis (EP)	Released: October 7, 2015
Yelawolf	Hotel (EP)	Released: October 10, 2016
DJ Paul	YOTS: Year of the Six, Pt. 1	Released: October 28, 2016
Struggle Jennings	Return of the Outlaw (EP)	Released: November 11, 2016
DJ Paul	YOTS: Year of the Six, Pt. 2	Released: November 25, 2016
Yelawolf	Trial by Fire	Released: October 27, 2017
Yelawolf	Trunk Muzik 3	Released: March 29, 2019
Yelawolf	Ghetto Cowboy	Released: October 31, 2019
Yelawolf & Caskey	Yelawolf Blacksheep	Released: February 19, 2021
Yelawolf & Riff Raff	Turquoise Tornado	Released: April 9, 2021
Yelawolf & DJ Paul	Slumafia (EP)	Released: April 16, 2021
Yelawolf & DJ Muggs	Mile Zero	Released: April 23, 2021
Yelawolf	Mud Mouth	Released: April 30, 2021
Yelawolf & Shooter Jennings	Sometimes Y	Released: March 11, 2022
Yelawolf	War Story	Released: June 7, 2024
Yelawolf & J. Michael Phillips	Whiskey and Roses	Released: July 11, 2025

== Personal life ==
Yelawolf has three children from a previous relationship with Sonora Rosario.

In July 2013, Yelawolf got engaged to his girlfriend, recording artist Fefe Dobson. On September 27, 2019, Yelawolf posted snapshots of their wedding ceremony at The Rhinestone Wedding Chapel in Nashville, Tennessee.

== Discography ==
Studio albums

- Creek Water (2005)
- Radioactive (2011)
- Love Story (2015)
- Trial by Fire (2017)
- Trunk Muzik 3 (2019)
- Ghetto Cowboy (2019)
- Mud Mouth (2021)
- War Story (2024)

Compilation albums

- Shady XV (with Shady Records) (2014)

Solo EPs

- Arena Rap (2008)
- Trunk Muzik 0-60 (2010)
- Hotel (2016)

Collaborative albums

- Yelawolf Blacksheep (with Caskey) (2021)
- Turquoise Tornado (with Riff Raff) (2021)
- Mile Zero (with DJ Muggs) (2021)
- Sometimes Y (with Shooter Jennings) (2022)

Collaborative EPs

- The Slumdon Bridge (with Ed Sheeran) (2012)
- Psycho White (with Travis Barker) (2012)
- Black Fall (with DJ Paul) (2013)
- Catfish Billy x Cub Cook Up Boss (with Cook Up Boss) (2017)
- Catfish Billy x Cub Cook Up Boss Slum Trap (with Cook Up Boss) (2019)
- Slumafia (with DJ Paul) (2021)

Mixtapes

- Pissin' in a Barrel of Beez (2005)
- Ball of Flames: The Ballad of Slick Rick E. Bobby (2007)
- Stereo: A Hip-Hop Tribute To Classic Rock (2008)
- Trunk Muzik (2010)
- Heart of Dixie (2012)
- Trunk Muzik Returns (2013)

== Filmography ==
=== Television ===
Year	Title	Role	Notes
2010	BET Hip Hop Awards 2010	Himself	Live performance
2010	Rob Dyrdek's Fantasy Factory	Himself	Episode 3.12
2011	Last Call with Carson Daly	Himself	1 episode
2011	BET Hip Hop Awards 2011	Himself	Live performance
2011	Single Ladies	Nick	Episode 1.5
2011; 2014	Sons of Anarchy	—N/a	Soundtrack (2 episodes)
2011; 2015	Conan	Himself	2 episodes
2012	Girls	—N/a	Soundtrack (1 episode)
2013	Marked Up	Himself (1 episode)	TV series documentary
2015	Jimmy Kimmel Live!	Himself	Episode 13.64
2016	BET Awards 2016	Himself	Live performance
2020	Vecherniy Urgant	Himself (musical guest)	Episode 9.106
2020	Ridiculousness	Himself	Episode 16.36
2020	Yelawolf: A Slumerican Life	Himself	TV series documentary

=== Film ===
Year	Title	Role	Notes
2014	Ride Along	—N/a	Soundtrack
2019	The Peanut Butter Falcon	Ratboy	—N/a
2022	Jackass Forever	—N/a	Soundtrack with DJ Paul
