= DJ Klever =

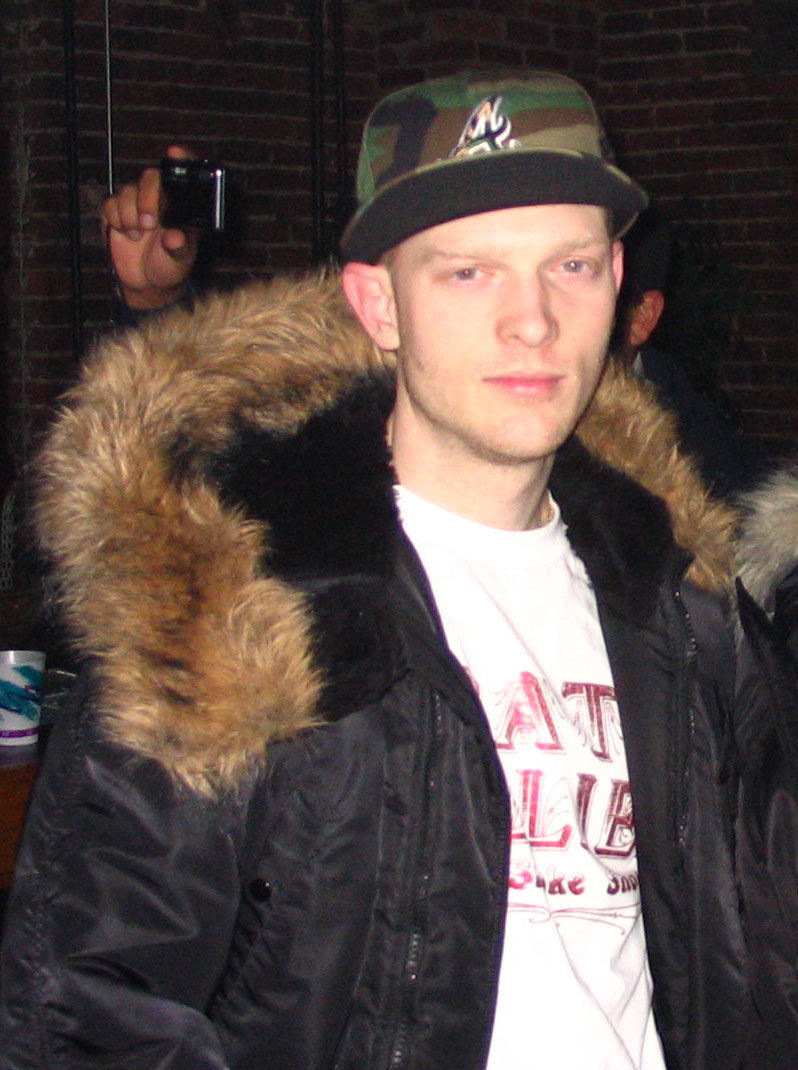
- Winkler in 2005

Background information
- Also known as: Killer, Klev
- Born: Josh Winkler
- Origin: Atlanta, Georgia, United States
- Occupation: DJ
- Instrument: Turntable
- Years active: 1994–present
- Label: Slumerican 2014-presents

Josh Winkler, better known as DJ Klever is an American turntablist and two-time US Disco Mix Club champion. He has toured the US and abroad, and currently resides in Atlanta, Georgia. Since early 2014 he has been rapper Yelawolf's touring DJ; he later started working with the rapper and signed to his record label Slumerican. He is involved in the rapper's second studio album Love Story, and has appeared in most of the singles' music videos.

== Biography ==
Winkler grew up in the Buford Highway area of Atlanta. His father was a blues musician and Winkler learned the drums as a child.

After witnessing someone use turntables in his teenage years, Winkler began working in the construction industry to save enough money to buy his own equipment. He soon began performing in his own crew, Break Mechanics, and taking part in regional competitions.

He became the sole white member of the Allies crew in 2000, after impressing founder DJ Craze at a competition in London.

== Titles and awards ==
- 1999 Guitar Center South Eastern Regional 1st place Champion
- 1999 Kool Mixx Atlanta 1st place Champion
- 2000 Atlanta DMC Regional 1st place Champion
- 2000 USA DMC 1st place Champion
- 2001 USA DMC 1st place Champion
- 2001 DMC World Champion 2nd place Runner up
- 2001 ITF USA 1st place Champion (Advanced Categories)
- 2001 Atlanta Kool Mixx 1st place Champion
- 2002 USA Kool Mixx 1st place Champion
- 2003 Atlanta Nike Battle Ground 1st place Champion
- 2003 Rough Raleigh DJ Battle 1st place Champion
- 2004 Breaklanta 1st place Champion
