= Kawan Prather =

American record executive (born 1973)

- Also known as: KP
- Born: Kawan Kawmi Prather; March 30, 1973 (age 53)
- Origin: Atlanta, Georgia, U.S.
- Genres: Hip-hop; R&B
- Occupations: Record executive; disc jockey; record producer
- Years active: 1991-present
- Labels: i am OTHER; Ghet-O-Vision; LaFace; Columbia; Def Jam; Interscope
- Formerly of: P.A.; Dungeon Family

Kawan Kawmi "KP" Prather (born March 30, 1973) is an American record executive. He began his career as a DJ for the Atlanta-based hip-hop group Parental Advisory (P.A.) in 1991, which were part of the larger collective Dungeon Family. The group was discovered by Pebbles and L.A. Reid, and were the first act from the collective to sign a major label deal with LaFace Records in the late 1990s, through which Prather launched the imprint label Ghet-O-Vision Entertainment. During this time, he worked in executive or A&R positions on albums for LaFace labelmates including TLC, OutKast, Goodie Mob, Usher, Pink, and Toni Braxton.

Prather is credited with signing Atlanta-based hip-hop acts YoungBloodZ and T.I. to LaFace Records by 1999, as well as Tennessee-based rapper Yelawolf to Interscope Records in 2008. In a joint venture with the aforementioned labels, Prather's Ghet-O-Vision imprint released the debut albums of the former two acts, Against da Grain (1999) and I'm Serious (2001), respectively. He served as Vice President of A&R at Arista Records from 1999 to 2001 and held a similar position at Columbia Records from 2002 to 2005. From 2012 to 2015, he served as Senior Vice President of A&R at Island Def Jam, where he signed 15-year-old R&B singer Khalil. In 2015, he was named Head of Music at Pharrell Williams' creative umbrella I Am Other.

== Biography ==
In 2000, LaFace was merged into Arista Records. After working on projects for Usher, Pink, and OutKast, he took a position as Executive Vice President, A&R, Sony Urban, Columbia Records. While at Columbia, Prather worked with Omarion, Killer Mike, Destiny's Child, Beyoncé, and served as A&R for John Legend.

== Discography ==
Album	Artist	Year	Credits
Un-Break My Heart [CD #2]	Toni Braxton	1996	A&R
ATLiens	OutKast	1996	A&R
And Then There Was Bass: Dis Bass Game Real	Various Artists	1997	Executive Producer
Nice & Slow	Usher	1998	A&R
Against Da Grain [Clean Version]	YoungBloodZ	1999	Executive Producer
Against Da Grain [Dirty Version]	YoungBloodZ	1999	Executive Producer
World Party [Clean Version]	Goodie Mob	1999	Artist Direction
Usher (Live)	Usher	1999	Producer
FanMail [Japan]	TLC	1999	A&R
Unpretty, Pt. 2 [Australia CD Single]	TLC	1999	A&R
Shaft [2000 Original Soundtrack]	Soundtrack	2000	Producer
South Will Rise Again [US]	Various Artists	2000	Producer
Can't Take Me Home	Pink	2000	A&R
Stankonia	OutKast	2000	A&R
I'm Serious	T.I.	2001	Producer
Even In Darkness	Dungeon Family	2001	A&R
So Fresh, So Clean	OutKast	2001	A&R
8701	Usher	2001	Associate Producer
U Don't Have to Call	Usher	2002	A&R
Missundaztood	Pink	2002	A&R
8701 (Australian Bonus Tracks)	Usher	2002	Associate Producer, A&R
Don't Let Me Get Me [Australia CD]	Pink	2002	A&R
U Don't Have to Call (Australian Single)	Usher	2002	Associate Producer, A&R
Family Portrait	Pink	2002	A&R
Monster	Killer Mike	2003	A&R
8701 (Bonus Videos)	Usher	2003	Associate Producer, A&R
Get Lifted	John Legend	2004	A&R
Wylde Tymes At Washington High	The Wylde Bunch	2004	Scratching, Executive Producer, A&R
Got Purp?, Vol. 2	Big Boi	2005	A&R
Wanted Reloaded (DualDisc)	Bow Wow	2005	A&R
8701 (Dual Disc)	Usher	2005	A&R
The One	Frankie J	2005	A&R
Wanted	Bow Wow	2005	A&R
The Price of Fame	Bow Wow	2006	A&R
21	Omarion	2006	Executive Producer, A&R
C.O.D. : Cash On Delivery	Ray Cash	2006	Producer, Executive Producer
Ice Box/The Truth [Australia Single]	Omarion	2006	Executive Producer
A Mary Mary Christmas	Mary Mary	2006	A&R
Entourage	Omarion	2006	Executive Producer
Ice Box [Sony]	Omarion	2007	Executive Producer
Pink Box	Pink	2007	A&R
Once Again	John Legend	2007	A&R
Evolver	John Legend	2008	Album Producer, Producer, Writer
D.N.A.	Mario	2009	Producer, Writer
Radioactive	Yelawolf	2011	Co-Executive Producer
