= Upchurch discography =

- Studio albums: 25
- EPs: 3
- Singles: 15
- Music videos: 78

The discography of Ryan Upchurch, an American rapper, singer-songwriter, and comedian, includes 24 studio albums, three extended-plays, and 15 singles. Upchurch began uploading videos to YouTube and Vine. While his early content was primarily comedic, he began incorporating rap-influenced "hick-hop" videos into his content. He released his first extended play, Cheatham County, in 2015, followed by a full-length album, Heart of America, in 2016. Both releases reached the top 30 of the Billboard Top Country Albums chart. Heart of America sold 1,300 copies in its first week of release.

The second full-length album, Chicken Willie, was released in August 2016. It reached No. 22 on Billboard's Top Country Albums and No. 11 on the Rap Albums charts, selling 2,800 copies in the first week. In 2017, Upchurch released another EP titled Summer Love, which is completely country-oriented, with no elements of rap music; and another studio album titled Son of the South. Summer Love, debuted at No. 33 in the Top Country Albums chart with 3,700 copies sold, while Son of the South debuted at No. 29 with 48,100 copies sold. Upchurch's fifth studio album, King of Dixie, was released on November 10, 2017, and features 19 tracks. Upchurch's first rock album, Creeker, was released on April 20 which was focused on rock with few rap elements. His August 2018 release, Supernatural, a rap-focused album with some country elements, peaked at No. 6 on Billboard's Top Country Albums. His December 2018 album, River Rat, peaked at No. 22. Upchurch released his next album, Creeker II in April 2019. Later that year, he released Parachute on September 24, followed by a collaboration album with Adam Calhoun entitled Hooligan on November 25. On April 20, 2020, Upchurch released his eleventh album Everlasting Country containing a more traditional country sound. It peaked at No. 61 on the Billboard 200 and No. 6 on the Country Albums chart. He transitioned to his own labels (Stonebaby Sounds and Luce-N-Up Records). His recent work, including the Blue Genes series and the 2025 release Creeker 3.

== Studio albums ==
Title	Album details	Peak chart positions						Sales
Title	Album details	US	US Country	US Rap	US Rock	US Heat	US Indie	Sales
Heart of America	Release date: January 15, 2016; Label: Johnny Cashville / Black Fly Music	—	30	24	—	5	31	US: 1,800
Chicken Willie	Release date: August 12, 2016; Label: RHEC Entertainment	—	22	11	—	1	11	US: 3,500
Bad Mutha Fucka	Release date: December 15, 2016; Label: RHEC Entertainment	—	42	11	—	2	22	
Son of the South	Release date: May 5, 2017; Label: Mud to Gold Entertainment	182	29	—	—	2	9	US: 6,000
King of Dixie	Release date: November 10, 2017; Label: Mud to Gold Entertainment	60	10	25	—	—	3	US: 14,800
Creeker	Release date: February 12, 2018; Label: Mud to Gold Entertainment	35	5	—	6	—	3	US: 15,800
The Oven (with Demun Jones)	Release date: June 29, 2018; Label: RAHHH	—	—	—	—	—	10	
Supernatural	Release date: August 19, 2018; Label: Mud to Gold Entertainment	71	6	—	—	—	5	US: 16,800
River Rat	Release date: December 21, 2018; Label: Mud to Gold Entertainment	191	21	—	—	—	3	US: 10,800
Creeker II	Release date: April 20, 2019; Label: Mud to Gold Entertainment	66	7	—	10	—	4	
Parachute	Release date: September 24, 2019; Label: Mud to Gold Entertainment	52	6	23	—	—	4	US: 12,400
Hooligan (with Adam Calhoun)	Release date: November 25, 2019; Label: ACal / RHEC	160	—	—	—	—	3	
Everlasting Country	Release date: April 20, 2020; Label: Stonebaby Sounds / Mud to Gold Entertainment	61	6	—	—	—	6	
Hideas: The Album	Release date: January 22, 2021; Label: Stonebaby Sounds	—	—	—	—	—	—	
Mud to Gold	Release date: February 10, 2021; Label: Mud to Gold Entertainment	174	—	—	—	—	—	
Upchurch Remixed (with DJ Cliffy D)	Release date: May 18, 2021; Label: DJ Cliffy D	—	—	—	—	—	—	
Same Ol Same Ol	Release date: June 26, 2021; Label: Mud to Gold Entertainment	—	17	—	—	—	—	
People's Champ	Release date: February 4, 2022; Label: Mud to Gold Entertainment / Stonebaby Sounds	101	—	—	—	—	—	
Pioneer	Release date: March 16, 2023; Label: Luce-N-Up / Stonebaby Sounds	—	—	—	—	—	—	
Blue Genes	Release date: July 14, 2023; Label: Luce-N-Up / Kalani OnDaBeat	—	—	—	—	—	—	
Concert for the Crickets	Release date: October 31, 2023; Label: Luce-N-Up / Kalani OnDaBeat	—	—	—	—	—	—	
Blue Genes II	Release date: February 15, 2024; Label: Luce-N-Up / Kalani OnDaBeat	—	—	—	—	—	—	
Turbulence	Release date: October 22, 2024; Label: Luce-N-Up / Kalani OnDaBeat	—	—	—	—	—	—	
Creeker 3 (with The Dixielanders)	Release date: April 30, 2025; Label: Luce-N-Up	—	—	—	—	—	—	
Black Denim (with Chris Hosier)	Release date: September 26, 2025; Label: Music City Magic Man	—	—	—	—	—	—	
First Edition (Side A)	Release date: September 20, 2026; Label: Mud to Gold	—	—	—	—	—	—	
"—" denotes releases that did not chart

== Extended plays ==
Title	EP details	Peak chart positions				Sales
Title	EP details	US Country	US Rap	US Heat	US Indie	Sales
Cheatham County	Release date: May 12, 2015; Label: Black Fly Music	29	18	7	23	
Summer Love (as Ryan Upchurch)	Release date: May 5, 2017; Label: Redneck Nation	33	—	3	11	US: 400,000
Project X, Vol. 1 (with Bottleneck)	Release date: January 30, 2018; Label: Redneck Nation	27	—	—	10	
"—" denotes releases that did not chart

== Singles ==
Year	Single	Peak position	Certifications	Album
Year	Single	US Country	Certifications	Album
2014	"We On" (with Showtime)	—		Non-album singles
2014	"Raise Hell and Eat Cornbread"	—		Non-album singles
2016	"Southern Land" (with Taylor Ray Holbrook)	44	RIAA: Gold	Non-album singles
2017	"Where You From" (with SMO)	—		Non-album singles
2018	"Shoulda Named It After Me" (with Colt Ford)	46		Non-album singles
2018	"Down South & Dirty" (with Big Snap)	—		Non-album singles
2019	"Hey Boy, Hey Girl" (with Katie Noel)	47		Non-album singles
2021	"Monster" (with Merkules)	—		Non-album singles
2021	"Cashville Stomp" (feat. Young Buck)	—		Non-album singles
2021	"Captain Hookless" (with DJ Cliffy D)	—		Non-album singles
2022	"Long Live the South" (with JJ Lawhorn)	—		Non-album singles
2025	"They Want Me Dead Right Now"	—		Non-album singles
2025	"The Last Reminder"	—		Non-album singles
2025	"Music City Makes a Killin"	—		Non-album singles
2025	"Throw Away"	—		Non-album singles
"—" denotes releases that did not chart

== Other certified songs ==
Year	Single	Certifications	Album
2015	"Outlaw" (feat. Luke Combs)	RIAA: Platinum	Heart of America
2016	"The Old Days" (feat. Justin Adams)	RIAA: Gold	Bad Mutha Fucka
2016	"Hillbilly"	RIAA: Gold	Bad Mutha Fucka
2016	"Rolling Stoned"	RIAA: Platinum	Bad Mutha Fucka
2018	"Dirty South"	RIAA: Gold	Creeker
2019	"Holler Boys"	RIAA: Platinum	Parachute

== Music videos ==
Year	Video	Director
2015	"Can I Get an Outlaw" ft. Luke Combs	Charlie P / BlackFlyMusic
2015	"Cheatham County"	Charlie P / BlackFlyMusic
2015	"Country Way"	Charlie P / BlackFlyMusic
2016	"Hell Yeah"	Charlie P / BlackFlyMusic
2016	"Come and Get It"	BlackFlyMusic
2016	"Dirty Boys"	RHEC Entertainment
2016	"Bad Mutha F**ka"	BlackFlyMusic
2016	"Shit Bubba"	BlackFlyMusic
2016	"Rollin Stoned"	RHEC Entertainment
2017	"Hillbilly"	Redneck Nation
2017	"Shoot the Moon"	Charlie P / BlackFlyMusic
2017	"Campfire Cologne"	Redneck Nation
2017	"Old Days"	Redneck Nation
2017	"Ghost"	Redneck Nation
2017	"Summer Love"	Redneck Nation
2017	"White Lightning"	Redneck Nation
2017	"Legend"	Redneck Nation
2017	"Radio Jam"	Redneck Nation
2017	"Johnny Cash"	Redneck Nation
2017	"American Made"	Redneck Nation
2017	"Bloodshed"	Redneck Nation
2018	"Dirty Hat"	Redneck Nation
2018	"Traveler"	Redneck Nation
2018	"Dirty South"	A. Luce Vision
2018	"PondCreek Road"	A. Luce Vision
2018	"Buzz Won't Last"	A. Luce Vision
2018	"Who"	A. Luce Vision
2018	"The Oven"	A. Luce Vision
2018	"My Neck of the Woods"	A. Luce Vision
2018	"Spotlight"	A. Luce Vision
2018	"Yz"	A. Luce Vision
2018	"Don't Come Knockin"	A. Luce Vision
2019	"Cheatham"	A. Luce Vision
2019	"Dukes of Hazzard"	A. Luce Vision
2019	"Blue Moon"	A. Luce Vision
2019	"Ghost Ranch"	A. Luce Vision
2019	"Holler Boys"	A. Luce Vision
2019	"Fallen"	A. Luce Vision
2019	"Hooligan"	A. Luce Vision / Drake McGuire
2020	"Roots Run Deep"	A. Luce Vision
2020	"Everlasting Country"	A. Luce Vision
2020	"Said F**k It"	Upchurch / A. Luce Vision
2020	"A Little While" (with Clay Walker)	A. Luce Vision
2020	"Miss My Buddies"	A. Luce Vision
2021	"Real Country"	A. Luce Vision
2021	"Broadway Girls (Remix)" (with Chase Matthew)	A. Luce Vision
2022	"Peoples Champ"	A. Luce Vision
2022	"Look At These Dudes"	A. Luce Vision
2022	"Necks Too Red"	A. Luce Vision
2022	"Superstar"	A. Luce Vision
2022	"Built Like That"	A. Luce Vision
2022	"The Other Country Boy"	A. Luce Vision
2022	"Desperado"	A. Luce Vision
2023	"Silver Circles"	A. Luce Vision
2023	"Pioneer"	A. Luce Vision
2023	"Middle Of the Night Ft. Brianna Harness"	A. Luce Vision
2023	"Bloodline" (Creeker Sessions)	A. Luce Vision
2023	"Flowers all Bloom" (Creeker Sessions)	A. Luce Vision
2023	"Ice Cold" (Creeker Sessions)	A. Luce Vision
2023	"Magic Mountain" (Creeker Sessions)	A. Luce Vision
2023	"Here There Now Then" (Creeker Sessions)	A. Luce Vision
2023	"No Title"	A. Luce Vision
2023	"LONESTAR"	A. Luce Vision
2023	"County ain't fair"	A. Luce Vision
2023	"Don’t Ever Die"	A. Luce Vision
2023	"Motion Picture"	A. Luce Vision
2024	"SUS"	A. Luce Vision
2024	"PROVE IT"	A. Luce Vision
2024	"JAMES DEAN"	A. Luce Vision
2025	"DOOIN’ RAPPIN"	A. Luce Vision
2025	"Heavier Rain"	A. Luce Vision
2025	DOOIN MORE RAPPIN	A. Luce Vision
2025	Flame & Halo	A. Luce Vision
2025	Massacre	A. Luce Vision
2025	Honeysuckles & Rain	A. Luce Vision
2025	Music City Makes a Killin	
