= We Are Charlie Kirk =

2025 AI-generated song

Single by Spalexma

from the album Charlie Kirk Forever Alive
- Released: September 16, 2025
- Length: 3:44
- Label: SP Music Project
- Songwriter: Sargis Poghosyan

Spalexma singles chronology
"I Will Be Stronger Than Ever" (2025)	"We Are Charlie Kirk" (2025)	"Welcome Home Charlie" (2025)

Audio
- "We Are Charlie Kirk": file; help

"We Are Charlie Kirk" is an AI-generated song that was released as a single on September 16, 2025. It is a tribute to American right-wing activist Charlie Kirk, who was assassinated six days prior on September 10. Shortly after its release, it was repurposed as an internet meme.

The song first spread on social media due to its inclusion in AI-generated videos depicting conservative figures, such as Vice President JD Vance, tearfully singing it. Other TikTok accounts then attached the song to their own commemorations to Kirk, as well as ironic memes making light of the song, Kirk, or his death. The latter included photos and videos of his face edited onto other pop cultural figures' faces, referred to as "Kirkifying" the person. "We Are Charlie Kirk" appeared in over 58,000 videos on the platform. It appeared on a Billboard chart and a Spotify chart in 2025, which was the first year AI-generated songs appeared on such charts.

== Background ==
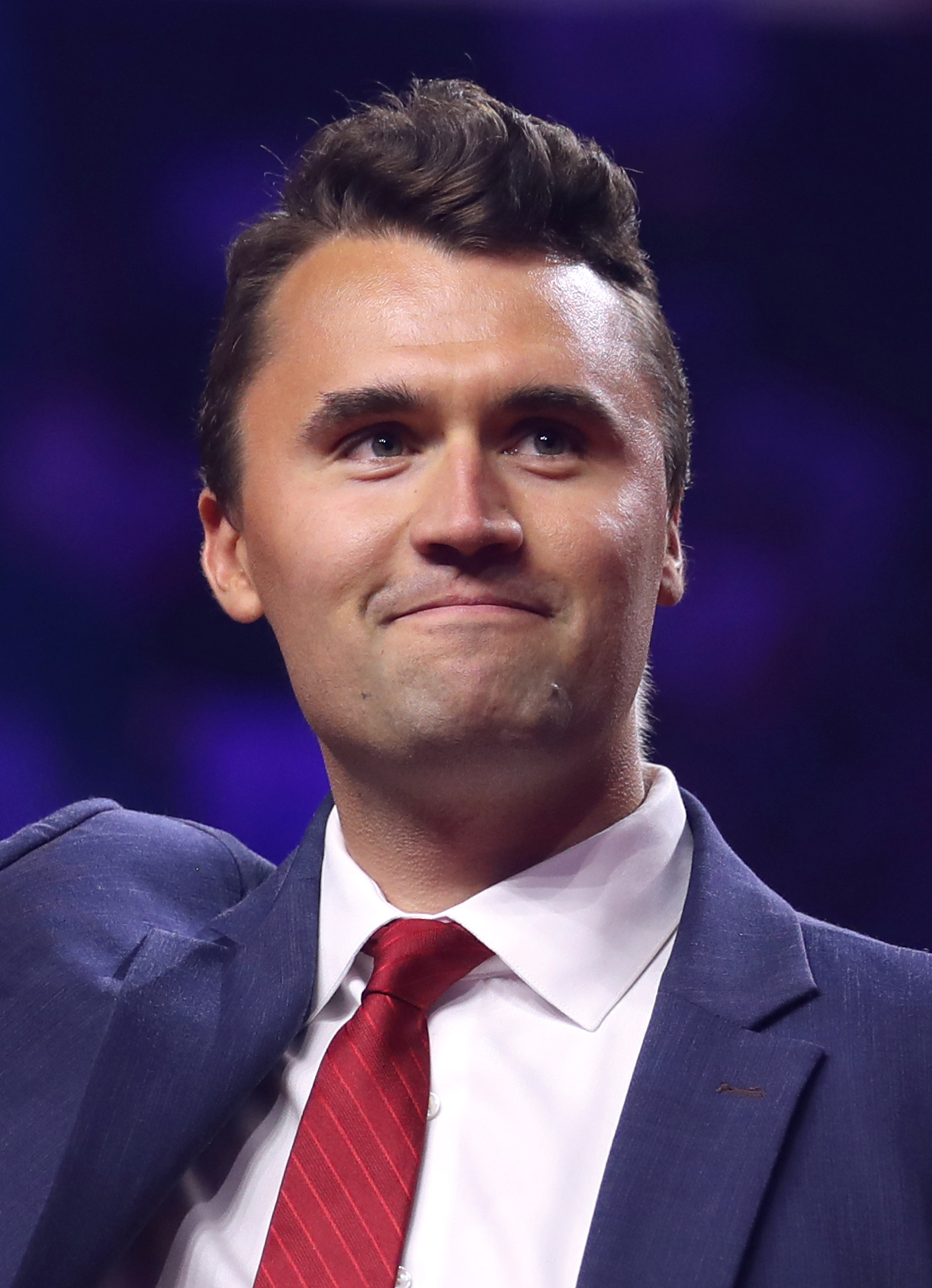
Charlie Kirk, the song's namesake, in 2024

Charlie Kirk was an American right-wing political activist and founder of the conservative youth organization Turning Point USA (TPUSA). Throughout his career, he was generally popular among the American right wing, though his more controversial positions were criticized by many scholars, commentators, and detractors.

On September 10, 2025, Kirk was assassinated during a TPUSA event at Utah Valley University in Orem, Utah. A man named Tyler Robinson was arrested and charged with the shooting. Conservatives gave an outpouring of praise for Kirk's activism, while many news organizations criticized his positions. Internet memes making light of Kirk's death went viral on platforms such as X.

Prior to Kirk's assassination, text, photos, videos, and music developed by generative artificial intelligence programs including ChatGPT had become widespread on online platforms like X, Facebook, Instagram, TikTok, and YouTube. These AI programs have been blamed for causing these platforms to be filled with perceived low-quality artificial content, nicknamed "AI slop". AI-generated music, produced by software like Suno, has been criticized for copying elements and motifs from copyrighted music made by humans, and for frequently featuring a "robotic" vocal "accent". Some of the social media content—either commemorating or criticizing his legacy—appeared to be AI-generated.

== Release ==
On September 16, 2025, six days after Kirk's assassination, "We Are Charlie Kirk" was uploaded onto music streaming services. The song is credited to Spalexma as main artist and Sargis Poghosyan as songwriter. Spalexma does not have a social media presence, and began being credited with publishing music in May 2024. "We Are Charlie Kirk" is one of many songs among their eighteen Christian-themed albums released in 2025, all of them presumably AI-generated. The song specifically was flagged by streaming service Deezer's AI music detection software as being artificially generated. It was initially uploaded as a single and then as the final song on an 11-track album titled Charlie Kirk Forever Alive. According to Politico, the song was "entirely AI-generated".

== Composition ==
"We Are Charlie Kirk" is a song with stylistic similarities to the power ballad genre of the 1980s in a runtime of three minutes and forty-four seconds. Between Kirk's assassination and the song's release, the titular phrase had been used by his supporters. The song memorializes Kirk with "loudly passionate, dramatic vocals", and has a prominent Christian theme, framing Kirk as a martyr who "lived for Jesus", and encourages supporters to continue that religious legacy.

== Reception ==
=== Critical reception ===
"We Are Charlie Kirk" was panned by media outlets, with several writers labelling it "AI slop". Harrison Brocklehurst wrote for The Tab that it had "cursed" lyrics and deserved to be mocked, but that it was stuck in his head. Referencing the vocals' loud delivery, he claimed the song was "honestly one of the loudest things ever put to record", continuing, "Can you say put to record actually, when it's clearly been made by AI? Probably not." Kotaku writer Kenneth Shepard criticized it as "one of the most ostentatious, dramatic pieces of 'music' I've ever heard". The Mary Sue's Braden Bjella said it was low quality in both its writing and production, and a writer for Al Bawaba said its lyrics were "uninspired" and its vocals "robotic". Paste listed it as the worst song of 2025, describing it as "a computer guessing what a 'serious' song sounds like after being force-fed a slurry of megachurch anthems, right-wing martyr fantasies, and PragerU comment sections".

Multiple writers criticized the song for presumably being created by AI. Konstantin Nowotny wrote for Der Freitag that he was concerned about the usage of AI to create "right-wing extremist propaganda" music similar to "We Are Charlie Kirk". In a December 2025 debate in San Francisco between writers Mike Solana and Sam Kriss, the latter told the local tech industry workers in attendance, including Substack CEO Chris Best, that "your contribution to global culture is software for churning out AI-generated crap" like "We Are Charlie Kirk". Later that month, Pitchfork ranked 101 moments in and around music culture in 2025 from 0.1 to 10.0. They listed "'We Are Charlie Kirk' AI song" at 0.7.

=== Viral spread ===
In this viral AI-generated video, JD Vance is depicted singing "We Are Charlie Kirk".

"We Are Charlie Kirk" is one of many songs made to memorialize Kirk after his assassination. Various AI-generated videos that featured celebrity musicians and Erika Kirk, Charlie's widow, singing different songs about Kirk received millions of views on YouTube. Many of the commenters on such videos responded as if these other songs were authentic. ViVO Tunes, a YouTube and TikTok account which posts AI-generated videos of celebrities and conservative personalities singing songs, released an AI-generated video of JD Vance tearfully singing "We Are Charlie Kirk". Braden Bjella reported that studies have shown that people leaning towards right-wing are more likely to be exposed to AI-generated content than others leaning centrist or left-wing, and he concluded that could make such content seem more normal to them.

"We Are Charlie Kirk" was attached to videos on platforms like TikTok, both by genuine supporters of Kirk who found the song emotional, as well as those making light of Kirk and his death, or criticizing the song and its noticeable AI "accent". After its initial release, it was repurposed as a meme. A TikTok user shared it, adding it was "genuinely the worst f**king [sic] song I've ever heard in my life"; their video was viewed over eight million times. An X user posted it with the caption: "Accidentally stumbled across this (presumably A.I [sic] generated) Charlie Kirk memorial song. It is, without question, the funniest thing I've ever heard. This has close to 100k monthly listeners, by the way." On TikTok, it was attached to over 58,000 videos, and Spalexma's YouTube upload of it received over 750,000 views.

Eventually, if a TikTok user searched Kirk's name, even if they were looking for legitimate news about the assassination, there was a high likelihood they would receive videos featuring "We Are Charlie Kirk" instead. Additionally, a trend arose to attach the song as background music to posts featuring Kirk's face pasted onto the faces of popular culture figures or random people, referred to as "Kirkifying" the person. Harrison Brocklehurst wrote that the majority of related content mocks the song, but some people "are seemingly using it earnestly and actually liking it rather than dragging it like it deserves to be dragged". He griped at its likelihood to be attached to a "dramatic montage of a fight scene from a film" or a clip from Stranger Things.

Kenneth Shepard describes some of these videos as a modern version of the rickroll, an internet-based prank originating in the 2000s, in which someone gets tricked into opening the YouTube link for Rick Astley's song "Never Gonna Give You Up" by clicking on a seemingly unrelated link. Other popular usages of "We Are Charlie Kirk" on TikTok include users recording their relatives' reactions to the song, as well as cover versions of it. In January 2026, following the federal investigation into Jerome Powell by the Donald Trump administration, "We are Jerome Powell", an AI-generated song parodying "We Are Charlie Kirk", spread on social media. In August 2026, American left-wing political commentator Hasan Piker sang the song at his live show.

=== Commercial performance ===
During its viral spread, the song placed atop Spotify's "Viral 50 – Global" playlist of charting songs, which expanded its reach. On the week of December 6, 2025, "We Are Charlie Kirk" debuted at number 26 on the Billboard Hot Christian Songs chart. It reached its peak position of number 21 the following week. 2025 was the first year that AI-generated songs appeared on a Billboard or Spotify chart.

== Personnel ==
Credits are adapted from Tidal.

- Sargis Poghasyan – writer
- SP Music Project – vocals

== Charts ==
Chart performance
Chart (2025)	Peak position
US Hot Christian Songs (Billboard)	21

== See also ==
- "Charlie", a political hip-hop song by rapper Tom MacDonald that memorializes Kirk
- "Jesus Is Coming Back Soon", a pop/rock song by Forrest Frank and Josiah Queen written as a response to Kirk's assassination
- Kirkification
