= Struggle Jennings =

American rapper (born 1980)

- Also known as: Young Struggle; Struggle
- Born: William Curtis Harness, Jr. May 31, 1980 (age 46); Nashville, Tennessee, U.S.
- Genre: Country rap
- Years active: 2002–present
- Labels: Massbaum; Slumerican; Angels & Outlaws
- Children: 8, including Brianna
- Relatives: Duane Eddy (grandfather); Jessi Colter (grandmother); Waylon Jennings (step-grandfather); Shooter Jennings (uncle)
- Website: strugglejennings.com

William Curtis Harness Jr. (born May 31, 1980), professionally known as Struggle Jennings, is an American rapper from Nashville, Tennessee. Jennings was one of the original members of Yelawolf's Slumerican label roster along with Bubba Sparxxx.

== Career ==
Harness was born to William Harness Sr and Jennifer Eddy, the daughter of Duane Eddy and Jessi Colter. Harness Sr. was murdered in 1990. Harness Jr. spent much of his childhood in the company of his grandmother's second husband, Waylon Jennings, whose surname he took as his stage name. His uncle is country rock singer Shooter Jennings, who is only one year older.

Harness started his music career around 2002. He began by selling mixtapes out of his car and on the streets. It is unknown how many mixtapes Harness released in his career, but his oldest known mixtape is Strugglin' Til We Make It, which he released with Wyteboy Slim in 2003. In 2005, Harness appeared on Jelly Roll's mixtape The Halfway House. Harness also released his mixtape Tryin 2 Eat in 2005 and his mixtape Soundtrack To An Indictment in 2009.

Harness was incarcerated on drug-related charges in 2011. In 2013, Harness appeared on Yelawolf's mixtape Wyte Dawg and released his nine-track album I Am Struggle. After being released from prison in 2016, Harness released Return of the Outlaw EP via Slumerican. From 2017 to 2018, he collaborated with longtime friend and rapper JellyRoll on a trilogy of Waylon & Willie albums, the title of which pays homage to Waylon Jennings and Willie Nelson. Struggle and his mother, Jenni Eddy Jennings, created their Spiritual Warfare EP towards the end of 2018. On January 15, 2019, Struggle and his oldest daughter, singer Brianna Harness, released a collaborative EP entitled Sunny Days which snagged the #3 spot on Billboard Blues Albums charts. In February 2019, he also released his first solo studio album since 2011 via his own label called "Angels & Outlaws" formed that same year.

The LP titled The Widow's Son included guest appearances by Bubba Sparxxx, Jeremy Penick, Julie Roberts, Alexander King and Yelawolf.

On November 15, 2019, Jennings released the full-length album entitled Angels & Outlaws featuring 11 tracks in collaboration with his guitarist Trap DeVille and his daughter and music newcomer, Brianna Harness. The album peaked at #8 on iTunes Alternative charts.

In June 2020, Jennings teamed up with Adam Calhoun for the EP "Legends" and in December 2020, fans were surprised by the long anticipated release of "Waylon & Willie IV", the fourth record in the collaboration series between Struggle and his fellow Nashville native, Jelly Roll. On April 9, 2021, Jennings released a solo LP entitled "Troubadour of Troubled Souls" and on April 30, 2021, he released a second collaboration LP with Illinois rapper Adam Calhoun, entitled "Outlaw Shit" which gained notoriety through iTunes Rap Charts by claiming the #1 spot on release day. In 2021, Jennings can be found touring and working with artists Brianna Harness and Caitlynne Curtis to advance their independent careers via his label "Angels & Outlaws" based in Nashville.

In September 2021, Jennings and heavy metal vocalist Tommy Vext announced a co-headlining tour "The God Bless the Outlaws" across the United States.

In 2022, Jennings collaborated with independent rappers Tom MacDonald, Adam Calhoun and Nova Rockafeller for a feature on "In God We Trust", off of the collaboration album, "The Brave" from MacDonald and Calhoun.

In the last episode of The Grand Tour "One for the Road", Jeremy Clarkson plays "Monte Carlo" as the theme song for his Lancia Montecarlo.

== Discography ==
=== Studio albums ===
List of studio albums, with selected details and chart positions
Title	Studio album details	Peak chart positions	
Title	Studio album details	US Indie	US Heat.
I Am Struggle	Release date: May 17, 2013; Label: Massbaum; Format: Digital download, streaming	—	—
Waylon & Willie (with JellyRoll)	Release date: November 3, 2017; Label: Jelly Roll; Format: Digital download, streaming	28	4
Waylon & Willie II (with JellyRoll)	Release date: April 23, 2018; Label: Jelly Roll; Format: Digital download, streaming	17	6
Waylon & Willie III (with JellyRoll)	Release date: November 16, 2018; Label: Jelly Roll; Format: Digital download, streaming	25	4
The Widow's Son	Release date: February 15, 2019; Label: Angels & Outlaws; Format: Digital download, streaming	43	20
Legend (with Adam Calhoun)	Release date: June 9, 2020; Label: ACal, Angels & Outlaws; Format: Digital download, streaming	—	18
Waylon & Willie IV (with JellyRoll)	Release date: December 16, 2020; Label: Jelly Roll, Struggle; Format: Digital download, streaming	—	—
Troubadour of Troubled Souls	Release date: April 9, 2021; Label: Angels & Outlaws; Format: Digital download, streaming	—	—
Outlaw Shxt (with Adam Calhoun)	Release date: April 30, 2021; Label: ACal, Angels & Outlaws; Format: Digital download, streaming	—	—
Monte Carlo	Release date: May 26, 2023; Label: Angels & Outlaws; Format: Digital download, streaming	—	—
El Camino	Release date: May 31, 2024; Label: Angels & Outlaws; Format: Digital download, streaming	—	—
"—" denotes releases that did not chart

=== Mixtapes ===
List of mixtapes, with selected details
Title	Mixtape details
Strugglin' Til We Make It (with Wyteboy Slim)	Released: 2003; Label: Self-released; Format: CD, digital download, streaming
Tryin 2 Eat (as Young Struggle)	Released: 2006; Label: Self-released; Format: CD, digital download, streaming
Soundtrack To An Indictment	Released: 2009; Label: Self-released; Format: CD, digital download, streaming

=== Extended plays ===
List of EPs, with selected details
Title	EP details	Peak chart positions	
Title	EP details	US Blues	US Heat.
Return of the Outlaw	Release date: November 11, 2016; Label: Slumerican; Format: Digital download, streaming	—	18
Spiritual Warfare (with Jenni Eddy Jennings)	Release date: December 21, 2018; Label: Angels & Outlaws; Format: Digital download, streaming	—	—
Sunny Days (with Brianna Harness)	Release date: January 18, 2019; Label: Angels & Outlaws; Format: Digital download, streaming	3	—
"—" denotes releases that did not chart

=== Certified songs ===
List of certified song, showing year released and album name
Title	Year	Certification	Album
"Fall In The Fall" (with Jelly Roll)	2017	RIAA: Gold	Waylon & Willie II
"God We Need You Now" (with Caitlynne Curtis)	2020	RIAA: Gold	Troubadour of Troubled Souls

=== Guest appearances ===
List of non-single guest appearances, with other performing artists, showing year released and album name
Title	Year	Other artist(s)	Album
"Far Froma Bitch"	2013	Yelawolf, Rittz, Big Hud	Wyte Dawg
"Hourglass"	2016	Ryan Upchurch	Heart of America
"Left Behind"	2016	Lil Wyte, JellyRoll	No Filter 2
"Born in Fire"	2017	Boondox, Jamie Madrox, Bubba Sparxxx	The Murder
"Struggle Speaks"	2017	Yelawolf	Trial by Fire
"The Tennessean"	2018	Ryan Upchurch	Supernatural
"West Side"	2019	Ryan Upchurch	Parachute
"Staring at a Stranger"	2020	JellyRoll	A Beautiful Disaster
"Afraid of Me"	2020	JellyRoll	Self Medicated
"Forrest Bondurant"	2020	BRODNAX	Brodnax
"Alcohol & Weed"	2021	Riff Raff, Yelawolf	Turquoise Turnado
"Harvest"	2021	Yelawolf, DJ Muggs	Mile Zero
"Money"	2021	Yelawolf, JellyRoll	Mud Mouth
"In God We Trust"	2022	Tom MacDonald, Adam Calhoun, Nova Rockafeller	The Brave
"Behind Bars"	2023	JellyRoll, Brantley Gilbert	Whitsitt Chapel
"Me and My House"	2023	Brantley Gilbert, Demun Jones	Tattoos
