= Facts (Tom MacDonald song) =

2024 single by Tom MacDonald

Single by Tom MacDonald featuring Ben Shapiro
- Released: January 26, 2024
- Genre: Trap; political hip hop
- Length: 3:20
- Songwriter: Tom MacDonald

Tom MacDonald singles chronology
"Stronger Version" (2023)	"Facts" (2024)	"The Machine" (2024)

Music video
- "Facts" on YouTube

"Facts" is a song by Canadian rapper Tom MacDonald featuring American political commentator Ben Shapiro. It was independently released on January 26, 2024, and marked Shapiro's debut musical appearance. It is a trap song described as "MAGA rap" with an anti-"woke" perspective, criticizing various things including gender pronouns, gun control, and the Black Lives Matter movement. The music video, which was released alongside the song, features MacDonald and Shapiro in hoodies.

The song reached number one on the US iTunes sales chart. "Facts" then debuted at number 16 on the Billboard Hot 100, making it Shapiro's first and only appearance on the chart and MacDonald's highest chart entry. It additionally debuted at number 30 on the Billboard Global 200, and the top ten on the US Hot R&B/Hip-Hop Songs and Hot Rap Songs charts, peaked at number three on the UK Singles Sales chart, and appeared in single charts from Canada and New Zealand.

"Facts" was panned by critics, particularly for Shapiro's verse on the song, its right-wing rhetoric, and Shapiro's hypocrisy for appearing on a rap song after having previously stated that rap music was not real music. Music critics from Exclaim! and The Mary Sue described it as the worst song of all time. The song was endorsed by fellow rapper Nicki Minaj, who is mentioned in Shapiro's verse, on Twitter; she received criticism from both fans and critics for her association with Shapiro.

== Background ==
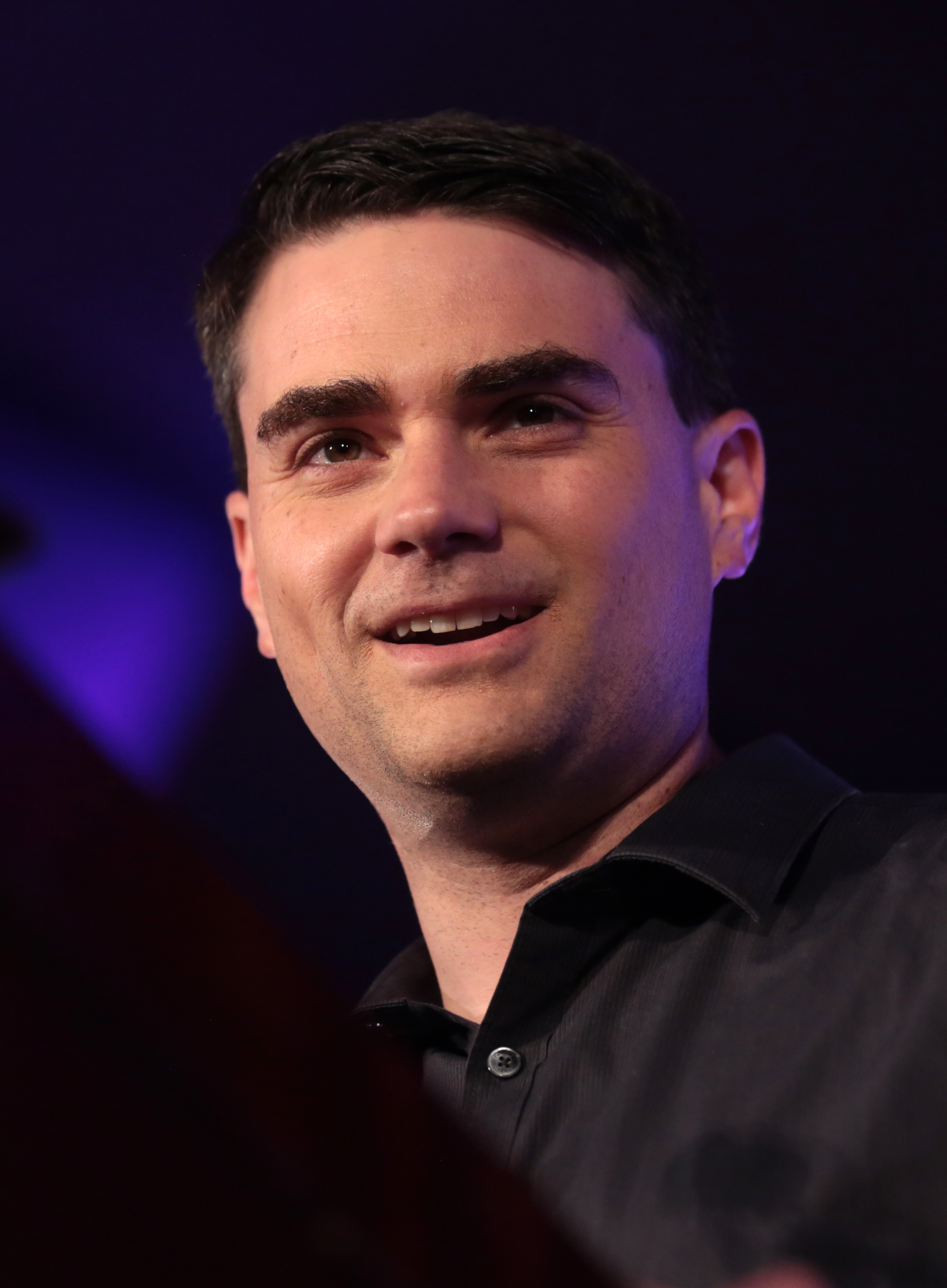
"Facts" marked the musical debut of conservative political commentator Ben Shapiro.

Prior to releasing "Facts", Canadian rapper Tom MacDonald received attention with his song "Dear Rappers" in 2017 and became known for his songs that contain conservative views. American political commentator Ben Shapiro founded the conservative news website, The Daily Wire, in 2015, and he became known for sharing his political opinions. Prior to appearing on "Facts", he had frequently criticized rap music as not being "a form of music", including in a viral tweet posted in 2012 and a 2019 interview with rapper Zuby. A video of him reading a bowdlerized version of the lyrics to Cardi B's song "WAP" in a deadpan tone in 2020 on his Daily Wire podcast, The Ben Shapiro Show, went viral online soon after its release. "Facts" was released on January 26, 2024. Upon its release, MacDonald stated that the song "encourage[d] high moral standards" and was intended as "a legendary troll on the music industry".

== Composition and lyrics ==
"Facts" is a trap song described by critics as "MAGA rap". Its title is a reference to Shapiro's catchphrase, "Facts don't care about your feelings". Lyrically, MacDonald raps from a conservative, anti-"woke" perspective, criticizing gender pronouns, the LGBTQ community, gun control, abortion rights, gender, opponents of white pride, the slogan "defund the police", and the Black Lives Matter movement. In Shapiro's verse, he references "woke Karens" in his comment sections, the rapper Lizzo, his yarmulke, and his viral "WAP" video, and claims that rap listeners waste money on strippers and will end up in jail. He ends his verse by stating he "just did this for fun", telling rapper Nicki Minaj to "take notes", and giving a call to action for listeners to download the song and get MacDonald and Shapiro a number one placement on a Billboard chart. In the song's chorus, MacDonald raps, "I hope I offend you/I ask myself 'What would Ben do?'".

== Music video ==
The music video for "Facts" was released the same day as the single. In the song's music video, MacDonald wears grills, box braids, and a hoodie that reads "I Don't Care If I Offend You". Shapiro also appears in a gray hoodie, which reads "facts don't care about your feelings" in red lettering, and on several TV screens, which P.J. Grisar of The Forward compared to a scene in the 1999 film The Matrix. For Mediaite, Jennifer Bowers Bahney called the music video for the song "the cringiest thing you will ever watch" and wrote that the song's lyrics "rattl[e] off a series of culture war hot topics".

Within five days of the music video's release, it received over nine million views on YouTube. Both MacDonald and Shapiro alleged in its first week of release that YouTube was suppressing the video due to it not being listed as the number one trending song on the platform. Despite receiving more views and comments, it sat behind the videos for "Hiss" by Megan Thee Stallion and "Big Foot" by Minaj on the list.

== Commercial performance ==
Following its release, "Facts" reached number one on the US iTunes sales chart. "Facts" debuted at number 16 on the Billboard Hot 100, giving Shapiro his debut appearance on the chart and MacDonald his fourth and highest-charting entry, following his 2021 songs "Brainwashed", "Fake Woke", and "Snowflakes". The song received 5.6 million streams and sold 96,000 downloads in its first week on the chart, giving it second-largest sales sum of 2024 by the time of its release following Megan Thee Stallion's "Hiss". It also peaked at number 30 on the Billboard Global 200.

"Facts" debuted at number eight on Billboard's Hot R&B/Hip-Hop Songs chart and at number six on its Hot Rap Songs chart. In addition, the song topped both Billboard's R&B/Hip-Hop Digital Song Sales and Rap Digital Song Sales charts, and peaked at number two on the all-genre Digital Song Sales chart. Internationally, "Facts" peaked at number three on the UK Singles Sales chart, number 26 on the New Zealand Hot Singles chart, and number 42 on the Canadian Hot 100.

== Reception ==
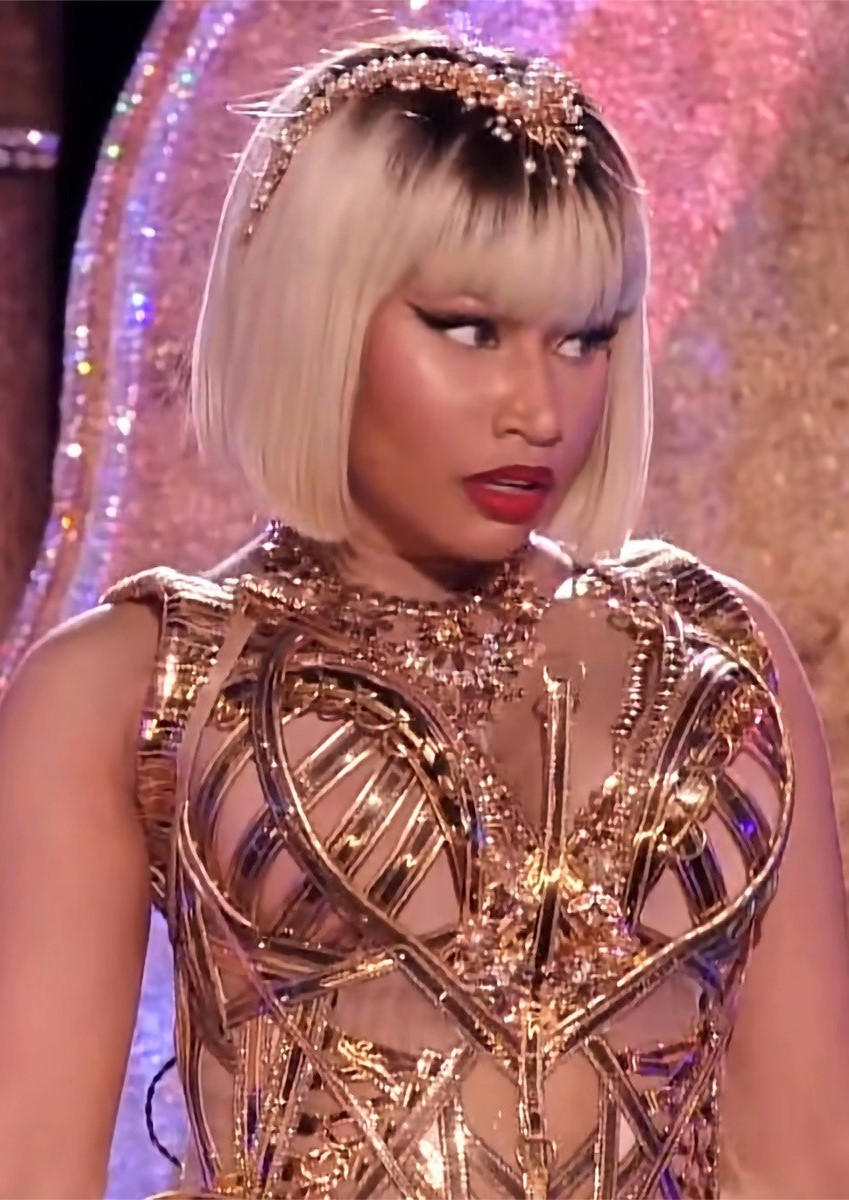
Shapiro was congratulated on Twitter by rapper Nicki Minaj, whom Shapiro mentions on the song, for reaching the top of the US iTunes sales chart.

Minaj congratulated Shapiro on Twitter upon the song reaching number one on the U.S. iTunes sales chart, calling it "not bad" while opining it had instrumental similarities to her 2010 single "Roman's Revenge". Following her endorsement of the song, her fans, known collectively as the Barbz, criticized her for her association with Shapiro. While involved in a feud with Megan Thee Stallion over her song "Hiss", Minaj released her song "Big Foot" in late January 2024 and soon tweeted, "Wait til they 'wake up' & listen to what Ben Shapiro is saying in #Facts." Boing Boing's Grant St. Clair opined surmised that Minaj's association with Shapiro was a "critically-panned kinship" due to the negative critical reception toward both "Big Foot" and "Facts".

For The Daily Beast, Justin Baragona criticized the song as "merely another lazy exercise in titillating easily entertained conservatives while supposedly enraging so-called "snowflake 'liberals'" on which "Shapiro awkwardly rattles off a bunch of trolly lyrics with the sole purpose of creating a viral clip" and MacDonald makes "well-worn right-wing culture war talking points". Alex Hudson of Exclaim! called it the "worst song ever" and "a three-minute self-parody that speed-runs through every talking point that anti-woke dogmatists are weirdly obsessed with", also calling it "dreadful", "terrible", and "depressingly predictable" and stating that Shapiro had "sunk to dismal new depths of nerdiness" by appearing on the song. Rachel Ulatowski of The Mary Sue, a feminist entertainment blog, similarly called it "the worst song in history" and "a horrific song that spews tons of racist and transphobic rhetoric and claims they're 'facts'" that also had "hateful, self-glorifying, deluded, and narcissistic lyrics". She further described Shapiro as "a talentless, overconfident man pretending he can rap" and "a hypocritical fool", comparing his appearance in the song's music video to "an 11-year-old boy who thinks putting his hoodie up makes him tough and cool".

Grant St. Clair opined that "Facts" being "a bad song ... goes without saying" and that it was "seemingly designed to cause outrage" due to "right-wing 'art'" having "nothing but outrage to rely on". St. Clair also wrote, "Shapiro has famously said that rap music isn't music, and I would have to agree with him where this song is concerned." Candace McDuffie of The Root wrote that "Facts" is "way, way worse than you think it is", adding that MacDonald and Shapiro were "co-opting a Black art form to disparage Black folks" and that MacDonald's and Shapiro's verses included "white supremacist rhetoric". She also called him "beyond hypocritical" for "employ[ing] the same artistry [he] claim[ed] to hate for profit" and criticized Minaj for her association with Shapiro as "disgusting" and "way to [sic] far — even by Barbz's standards".

For HotNewHipHop, Alexander Cole wrote that Shapiro's verse "has to be one of the worst verses ever recorded" in which he "sounds like an AI version of himself", also describing his flow as "Epic Rap Battles of History-core". P.J. Grisar of The Forward wrote that the song "doesn't register the irony that it is conveying what it believes is a subversive, devil may care attitude toward scandalizing leftist pieties via a medium — rap — that has historically offended almost everyone at some time or another". Kelly McClure of Salon wrote that Shapiro rapped "in what he likely believes to be the best of his ability". Herb Scribner and Anne Branigin of The Washington Post wrote that the lyrics "seem to call back to talking points floated frequently from far-right wing influencers and media outlets" and compared the song's success to that of "Try That in a Small Town" by Jason Aldean and "Rich Men North of Richmond" by Oliver Anthony, both of which found commercial success due to their popularity among conservative music fans. Variety included it on their list of the worst songs of 2024, with Chris Willman writing that Shapiro's "crude version of a robotic voice" was less lifelike than "feeing [sic] his voice into actual AI".

== Personnel ==
Credits are adapted from Tidal.

- Tom MacDonald – vocals, writing
- Ben Shapiro – vocals, featured artist

== Charts ==
Chart (2024)	Peak position
Canada Hot 100 (Billboard)	42
Global 200 (Billboard)	30
New Zealand Hot Singles (RMNZ)	26
UK Singles Sales (Official Charts)	3
US Billboard Hot 100	16
US Hot R&B/Hip-Hop Songs (Billboard)	8
