= Kirkification =

2025 AI-generated meme

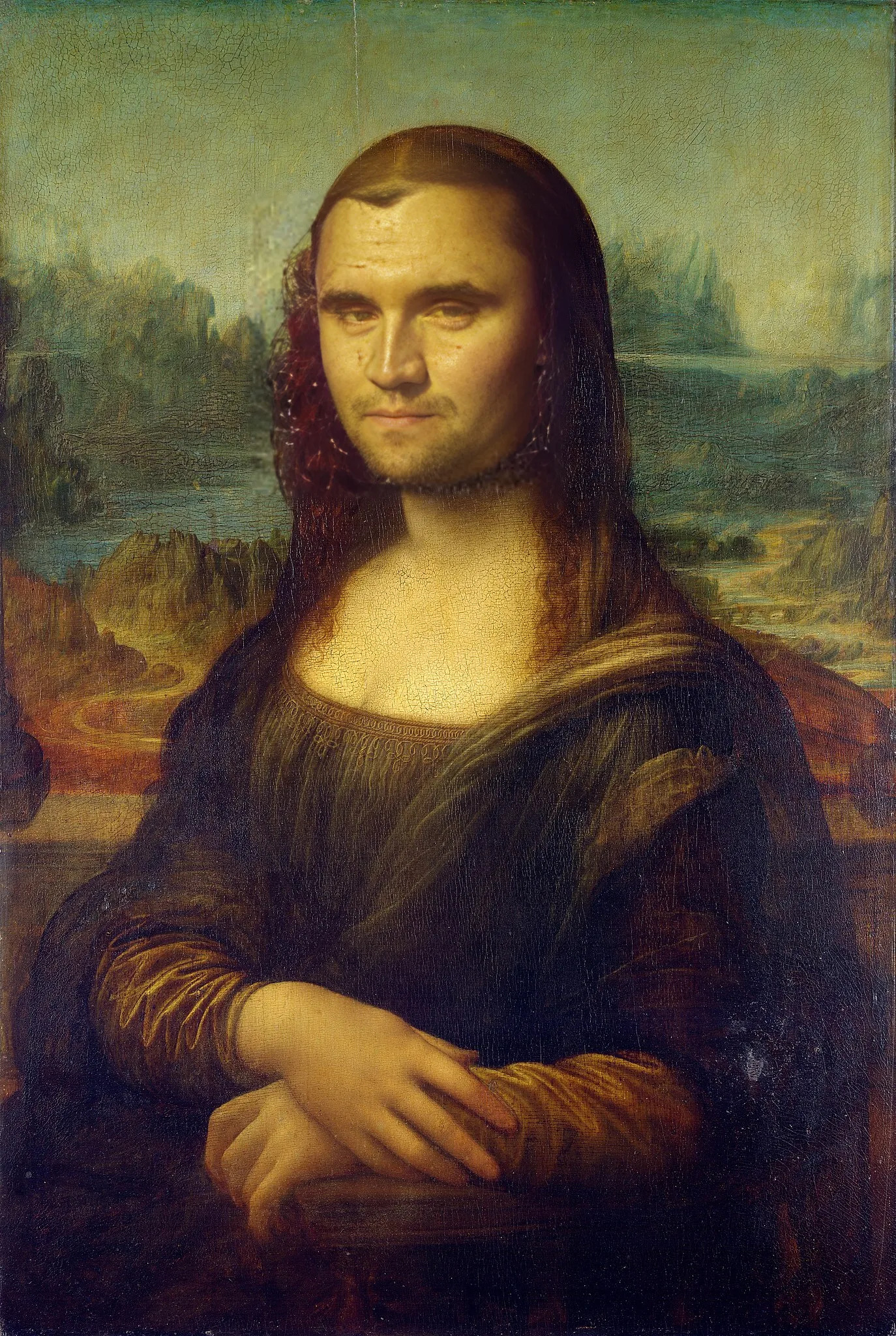
A "kirkified" image of the Mona Lisa made using a face swap tool

Kirkification (/kɜːrkɪfɪˈkeɪʃən/) is an internet meme involving the American political activist Charlie Kirk which circulated after his assassination. "Kirkified" memes typically involve swapping Kirk's face onto unlikely images or videos of pop culture figures, using artificial intelligence (AI) tools.

== Background ==
Charlie Kirk, an American activist and influencer, was assassinated in September 2025 during a Turning Point USA event at Utah Valley University. Immediately following his death, conservatives sought to suppress criticism against him.

== Origin and spread ==
Shortly after Kirk’s death, an online trend known as "Kirkification" began, in which users posted "kirkified" images and videos, made using AI image generation tools, that swap Kirk's face onto unlikely images, including pop culture figures.

"Kirkification" can also refer to altering words by adding Kirk to them. Lowkirkuinely is a mash-up of low-key, Kirk and genuinely. The addition of Kirk's last name to words began as a form of mockery, but then became a meme with no specific meaning.

== Reception and legacy ==
Journalist Kieran Press-Reynolds, writing for GQ, said "These largely anonymous people have flayed the late influencer into an entire genre of edits called 'Kirkslop'" and said, "the evil humor of the Kirk memes seems like a reaction or backlash to the way some conservatives have attempted to elevate Kirk into a kind of folk hero in the wake of his murder", further describing it as "cruelty for the sake of clicks and engagement" and a "hate-bait nuclear arms race".

The Guardian stated that the trend of online satirization "threatens to upend the legacy he had carefully cultivated during his lifetime". An expert in online hate movements said, "The jokes about Charlie Kirk are symbolic of what have been pretty seismic shifts happening within the online culture."

== See also ==
- "We Are Charlie Kirk" – 2025 AI-generated song, which similarly became an internet meme
