= Fake Woke =

2021 single by Tom MacDonald

Single by Tom MacDonald
- Released: January 29, 2021
- Genre: Political hip-hop
- Length: 4:12
- Label: Self-released
- Songwriter: Tom MacDonald
- Producer: Tom MacDonald

Tom MacDonald singles chronology
"Angels" (2020)	"Fake Woke" (2021)	"Cancelled" (2021)

Music video
- "Fake Woke" on YouTube

"Fake Woke" is a song written, produced, and performed by Canadian rapper Tom MacDonald. It was self-released as a single on January 29, 2021. A music video for the song, directed by his girlfriend and fellow musician Nova Rockafeller, was released simultaneously with the single. The American conservative news television channel Fox News promoted "Fake Woke" on its series The Story with Martha MacCallum and interviewed MacDonald about the song.

== Music and lyrics ==
The song begins with an isolated clean electric guitar. In the song's introduction, MacDonald disses American rapper Cardi B, criticizing her for being perceived as a role model, and also disses Eminem, pointing out how he used to gay bash and talk about murdering his mother in his songs, but now he does not want to associate with fans who voted for Donald Trump. He also takes a stand against the idea that white privilege exists and against the activist group Black Lives Matter, rapping, "I think Black Lives Matter was the stupidest name / When the system screwing everyone exactly the same". MacDonald also says that the left wing is "Fake Woke", hence the title of the song. However, he also criticizes the right wing in the line, "[People] hate their neighbor 'cause he wears a mask or he stays home / Has a daughter but his favorite artist said he slays hoes / picks her up from school, music slaps on the way home". MacDonald also criticizes censorship for being biased, saying, "Censorship's an issue 'cause they choose what they erase / There's a difference between hate speech and speech that you hate."

== Credits and personnel ==
Credits adapted from Tidal.

- Tom MacDonald – composer, producer, songwriter
- Evan Morgan – mixing and mastering

== Charts ==
=== Weekly charts ===
Weekly chart performance for "Fake Woke"
Chart (2021)	Peak position
Canada Digital Song Sales (Billboard)	9
UK Singles Sales (Official Charts)	62
US Billboard Hot 100	96
US Hot R&B/Hip-Hop Songs (Billboard)	34

=== Year-end charts ===
2021 year-end chart performance for "Fake Woke"
Chart (2021)	Position
US R&B/Hip-Hop Digital Song Sales (Billboard)	23

== Release history ==
Release dates and formats for "Fake Woke"
Region	Date	Format(s)	Label	Ref.
Various	January 29, 2021	Digital download; streaming	Self-released	
