= Nova Rockafeller =

Canadian rapper (born 1988)

- Also known as: Elle Dirty D, epdMC
- Born: Nova Leigh Paholek; 22 July 1988 (age 38); Edmonton, Alberta, Canada
- Genres: Pop rap; acoustic rock; hip hop; pop; EDM; punk rock
- Occupations: Rapper; singer; songwriter; music video director
- Instruments: Vocals; guitar
- Years active: 2006–present
- Labels: Boardwalk; Mercury; Island; Def Jam
- Spouse: Tom MacDonald (married 2026-present)
- Website: novarockafeller.com

Nova Leigh Paholek (born 22 July 1988), known professionally as Nova Rockafeller, is a Canadian independent rapper, singer, songwriter, and music video director.

== Early life ==
Rockafeller was born in Edmonton, and raised in Jamaica; living there from the ages of 9 to 14 after her family started a water sports business. She also briefly lived in Toronto and New York City. As a teen, she dropped out of high school and began rapping during a difficult period of her life split between sleeping at the Edmonton Youth Emergency Shelter and living in a series of group homes. She was inspired to start rapping after exploring the online battle rap forums by her then boyfriend.

== Career ==
Rockafeller grew up surrounded by music as her father and her brother, Terry Paholek, were heavily involved with the Edmonton music scene and had their own home studio. She began rapping at the age of 15 when she was living in a group home. The moniker 'Nova Rockafeller' was given to her one night during a party with other rappers, who decided she needed a new name.

In 2011, Rockafeller released her debut album Insufficient Funds, which chronicled six months of her life. In 2012, Rockafeller had her song 'call me (BAT MAN) 347-574-7192' posted on the front of The Pirate Bay during its period as 'The Promo Bay'; the song was available as a free download.

Mercury Records took notice of her, so Rockafeller moved to New York and signed with them. The label would later become Island Records, and, in turn Def Jam. Her relationship with Def Jam ended when the company dropped her without warning after three and a half years. She found out when her landlord said that the company would no longer pay her rent. Prior to the label dropping her, Rockafeller had been working on an album named Accidentally Gangster, which was cancelled.

In 2015, during her time with Def Jam, Rockafeller began to break out into the mainstream with her single "Made in Gold", which reached the Top 20 on Sirius Top Hits. The single was featured in teen comedy film The Duff. Her music has also been featured on Siesta Keys, Dancing with the Stars, and Bad Girls Club. That year, she toured with Set it Off and All Time Low, as well as performed at SXSW, Riot Fest, and the Gathering of the Juggalos. Since her appearance at the Gathering, Rockafeller has been associated with the Insane Clown Posse and the Juggalo movement. She also performed at Violent J's first solo charity tour with Lil Eazy-E.

In 2021, Rockafeller released "Hey You", her first solo single in over 2 years to tease her newest album Scared of Heights. The video received over 250,000 views within a single day.

=== Side projects ===
In 2012, Rockafeller launched her line of jewellery 'Toys on Chains'.

== Personal life ==
=== Relationships ===
In 2017, Rockafeller began dating Canadian rapper Tom MacDonald, known for his “MAGA rap”. Together, they started the band GFBF and began writing music. When MacDonald wrote 'Dear Rappers' and gained prominence, Rockafeller poured herself into supporting him. She shot and directed all of his music videos after 2017, created his website and was featured on most of his albums, and helped him navigate the music industry away from the pitfalls she experienced. The two married in 2026.

=== Influences ===
Rockafeller has cited some of her influences as Good Charlotte, Blink-182, Fugees, A Tribe Called Quest, Damian Marley, Weezer, Busta Rhymes, Outkast, Bright Eyes, Nirvana, Die Antwoord, and Meg Myers.

== Discography ==
=== Studio albums ===
List of studio albums, with selected details
Title	Album details
Insufficient Funds	Released: 21 September 2011; Labels: Self-released; Formats: CD, digital download
Insufficient Funds +	Released: 2019; Labels: Self-released; Formats: CD
Scared of Heights	Released: 15 January 2021; Labels: Boardwalk Records; Formats: CD, digital download
As Far as the Stars (with Tom MacDonald and Brandon Hart)	Released: 9 April 2021; Labels: Self-released; Formats: CD
Yesterday (with Tom MacDonald)	Released: 18 October 2024; Labels: Self-released; Formats: CD
Wild Ones (with Tom MacDonald)	Released: 18 October 2024; Labels: Self-released; Formats: CD

=== EPs ===
Title	EP details
Problemchild	Released: 1 October 2014; Labels: Boardwalk; Formats: Digital download
N.O.V.A.	Released: 23 December 2015; Labels: Boardwalk; Formats: Digital download
AMPT	Released: 7 June 2019; Labels: Boardwalk; Formats: CD, digital download

=== Singles ===
- "1990s" (2014)
- "Made in Gold" (2015)
- "MI YARD" (2016)
- "Wishing Well" (2018)
- "Jesus on My Neck" (2018)
- "Genghis Khan" (2018)
- "Hey You" (2021)
- "Gang Gang (feat. Tom MacDonald)" (2021)
- "Did Your Best" (2021)
- "Lost Girls" (2023)

With Tom MacDonald

- "Sober" (2020), with Madchild, ft. Nova Rockafeller
- "Bad News" (2020), with Madchild, ft. Nova Rockafeller
- "Gang Gang" (2021)
- "No Good Bastards" (2021), with Nova Rockafeller & Brandon Hart
- "Church" (2021), with Brandon Hart ft. Nova Rockafeller
- "Heart Emojis" (2021), with Brandon Hart ft. Nova Rockafeller
- "In God We Trust" (2022), with Adam Calhoun, Struggle Jennings, & Nova Rockafeller
- "Chrome" (2023), with Adam Calhoun & Nova Rockafeller
- ”Goodbye Joe” (2024), Tom McDonald ft. Nova Rockafeller

With Violent J

- "Sick Kidz" (2016), with Violent J, ft. Young Wicked, Nova Rockafeller & Lil Eazy-E

With The Wikid One

- "Find Me" (2017), ft. Nova Rockafeller

With Rp Jesus

- "Pillz" (2017), ft. GFBF, Nova Rockafeller & Tom MacDonald

With Thrashole

- "You Want Her" (2018), ft. Blimes, The Buttress & Nova Rockafeller

With D-LinQuint

- "Superstar" (2019), ft. Nova Rockafeller, Y.I.C & Jay P

With Rachel Geek

- "Come Talk to Me" (2020), ft. Nova Rockafeller
