= Tom MacDonald (rapper) =

Canadian musician and former wrestler (born 1988)

- Also known as: Allstar; TMax; T Mac; Mr. MacDonald
- Born: Thomas MacDonald; September 21, 1988 (age 38); Edmonton, Alberta, Canada
- Genre: Political hip-hop
- Occupations: Rapper; singer-songwriter; record producer; professional wrestler (former)
- Years active: 2006–present
- Spouse: Nova Rockafeller (married 2026-present)
- Professional wrestling career
- Ring name: "Allstar" Tom MacDonald
- Billed height: 5 ft 9 in (1.75 m)
- Billed weight: 152 lb (69 kg)
- Billed from: Vancouver, British Columbia, Canada
- Debut: February 28, 2003
- Retired: November 7, 2009

Thomas MacDonald (born September 21, 1988) is a Canadian rapper, singer-songwriter, record producer and former professional wrestler. He is known for commenting on social and political issues in his songs. His music has been characterized as "MAGA rap", a Trumpist subgenre of political hip-hop.

He rose to prominence with the release of his 2017 single "Dear Rappers". His 2021 single "Fake Woke" marked his first appearance on the Billboard Hot 100. His 2024 single "Facts" (featuring Ben Shapiro) debuted at number 16 on the Billboard Hot 100 and number 42 on the Canadian Hot 100.

== Early life and wrestling career ==
Thomas MacDonald was born on September 21, 1988, in Edmonton, Alberta, Canada. During his childhood he lived in Mission, British Columbia. When MacDonald was 13, his family moved to Alberta.

MacDonald had an exposure to politics at an early age. In an interview with PragerU, he said, "My dad and my grandfather were huge into politics, primarily American politics." MacDonald added, "My grandfather was a huge patriot, and I used to sit on the end of his bed, and we'd watch the news."

MacDonald fell in love with hip-hop as a child after buying a 2Pac CD at a pawn shop. Years later, one of his peers showed him an Eminem song while they rode the school bus together. It was MacDonald's first time listening to a white rapper and it inspired him to start writing his own rap lyrics. MacDonald briefly worked in construction before starting his professional wrestling career.

=== Professional wrestling ===
During his teenage years, MacDonald worked as a professional wrestler on the Canadian independent circuit, most prominently for the Edmonton-based promotion Monster Pro Wrestling (MPW). He made his debut in February 2003, in a dark triple threat match, which went to a no contest. Throughout the year, he would begin feuding with Bobby Sharp, after another dark match also went to a no contest. The feud concluded in December, when MacDonald defeated Sharp in a triple threat match, which included Brady Roberts.

By 2005, MacDonald was a member of the Custom-Made Renegades stable, led by Sharp. In a tournament for the newly created MPW Tag Team Championship, MacDonald and Sharp defeated Kris Knight and Shane O'Ryan, but lost to eventual winners the Dead Ringers in the semi-final. MacDonald and Ozz defeated the New Stallions in a #1 contender ship match for the tag team championship, but he and O'Ryan fell short to the Dead Ringers. Later that year, MacDonald unsuccessfully challenged Sharp for the MPW Junior Heavyweight Championship; the first match went to a no contest, and the second match saw him win by disqualification, but not the title, as it does not change hands in the event of a disqualification. In a hardcore match with Sharp, MacDonald brought a 9 iron golf club which almost tore off his right earlobe by ricocheting off a turnbuckle.

After sustaining a number of injuries, and with his appearances in professional wrestling dwindling, MacDonald began to focus more on his music career. His final match was at an Extreme Canadian Championship Wrestling (ECCW) show in November 2009, where he was defeated by the Divine Prophet.

== Music career ==
=== 2008–2010: Career beginnings ===
Towards the end of his professional wrestling career, MacDonald began releasing music. In 2008, MacDonald released the Mixtape Killville, under the name "T Max". It is the only body of work he has released under that name. In 2009, he started releasing music under the name "T Mac". In January of that year, he released the mixtape Young and Crazy. On October 27 he released the mixtape Creature from the Rap Lagoon, 10 days before his final wrestling match. In 2010, he released a collaborative EP with Aidan Synn Pringle called A Glorious Future.

=== 2011–2012: First releases as Tom MacDonald ===
In 2011, under the name Tom MacDonald, he released a collaborative mixtape with O.V. Charbonneau titled Feet Up. On December 15, 2012, he released the mixtape Infidelity in the Throne Room, under the same name. That same day he also released his debut album All Growed Up, under the name Mr. MacDonald. Since then, all his music has been released under the name Tom MacDonald.

=== 2013–2014: Bad Dream Mad Again, Something Like the Truth, LeeAnn's Son, and Bad Dream Mad Again II ===
In 2013, he released the mixtape Bad Dream Mad Again and a compilation album titled Something Like the Truth. In 2014, he released the albums LeeAnn's Son and Bad Dream Mad Again II.

=== 2015: MacBeth, Dream People & The Whiskey Wars, and See You Tomorrow ===
On March 22, 2015, MacDonald released the EP MacBeth. On December 21, he released a collaborative mixtape with Geek no Glasses called Dream People & The Whiskey Wars and the album See You Tomorrow.

=== 2017–2018: Therapy, Deathreats, Helluvit Tour, and breakthrough ===
On March 13, 2017, MacDonald released the EP Therapy. After nearly a decade of releasing music with little success, MacDonald experienced a breakthrough in his music career, with the release of the single "Dear Rappers" the following August. In 2018, he embarked on a summer tour called the "Helluvit Tour" with his girlfriend Nova Rockafeller, along with other rappers. In August of that year he released the album Deathreats.

=== 2019: Ghoststories and first Mac Lethal feud ===
In May 2019, MacDonald released the song "Straight White Male", which was written about straight white men being demonized. It was criticized on social media for its subject matter.

In June, following a heated exchange with rapper Mac Lethal on Twitter, MacDonald released a diss track against him called "Lethal Injection". Mac Lethal then responded with a diss track of his own called "Single White Female". MacDonald followed up with another diss track called "Mac Lethal Sucks". Mac Lethal ended the feud with a song called "Mac Lethal Sucks Pt. 2".

In September 2019, MacDonald released the single "Cloned Rappers", in which he espoused the idea that the Illuminati are cloning rappers, and disposing of the originals. In late 2019, MacDonald was scheduled to be a supporting act for Falling in Reverse's Episode IV Tour before it was cancelled.

=== 2020: Killing the Neighbors, Flowers for the Dead, and Gravestones ===
In early 2020, MacDonald collaborated with Madchild to release multiple singles. In January they released the songs "White Trash", "Sober, and "Bad News" with the latter two featuring vocals from Rockafeller. The singles were featured on their collaborative album Killing the Neighbors, which was released on February 4. Three days later they released the music video for song "D.R.U.G.", which was also featured on the album. In March 2020, MacDonald released the single "Coronavirus", which he wrote about the COVID-19 pandemic. On August 21, 2020, MacDonald released the single "People So Stupid". It reached number 100 on the Canada top 100.

=== 2021: As Far as the Stars, No Guts No Glory, and Us Against the World ===
In January 2021, MacDonald released the single "Fake Woke", which debuted at number 96 on the Billboard Hot 100. On February 26 MacDonald released the single "Clown World", which reached number one on the US iTunes hip-hop/rap sales chart, and number three on the all genre listing.

In 2021, MacDonald collaborated with Rockafeller and Brandon Hart to release a few singles. On March 19 they released the song, "No Good Bastards", which peaked at number 15 on Billboard's digital song sales chart. A week later they released the song "Church", and on April 2 they released the song "Heart Emojis". The singles were featured on their collaborative album As Far as the Stars, which was released on April 9.

After Eminem released a series of NFTs as part of his "Shady Con" event with Nifty Gateway, MacDonald purchased one—an Eminem-produced instrumental called "Stan's Revenge"—for $100,000. MacDonald used the instrumental to create his song "Dear Slim", released in May 2021. The song's accompanying music video paid homage to the music video for Eminem's song "Stan" (2000).

In June, he released "Snowflakes", which debuted on the Billboard Hot 100 at number 71. The music video featured conservative political commentator Blaire White as a background dancer. On July 16, he released the song "Withdrawls" in which he talks about addiction and mental health. His single "Brainwashed", released in August 2021, peaked at number 89 on the Billboard Hot 100.

On September 3, MacDonald released the album Us Against the World, which featured the singles, "No Lives Matter", "America", "Fake Woke", "Balloons", "Best Rapper Ever", "Dear Slim", and "Dummies". That same day he also released the album No Guts No Glory, which featured the singles "Don't Look Down", "Clown World", "Cancelled", "Angels", "Brainwashed", and "Withdrawals".

=== 2022–2023: The Brave, The Revolution, Renegade, and The Brave II ===
On March 4, 2022, MacDonald collaborated with Adam Calhoun to release an album, titled The Brave. It was the best-selling album of the week in the US upon its release in March 2022, having sold 16,000 copies that week.

On October 14, MacDonald released the song "Sheeple" which reached number one on the Billboard digital rap sales chart. On November 18, MacDonald released the album Renegade. On December 23, MacDonald released the song "Ghost" in which he sings about his love for Rockafeller. The song reached the number one spot on Billboard's Pop chart in January 2023.

MacDonald collaborated with Calhoun again in 2023 to release the song "American Flags", which reached number two on the Digital Songs chart in the US, and number eight in Canada. In the United States, it was the 70th most-downloaded song of 2023. In September 2023, MacDonald and Calhoun released the album, The Brave II.

=== 2024–2025: Proud to Be a Problem, No Lies, Truthurts, and second Mac Lethal feud ===
In January 2024, MacDonald collaborated with conservative political commentator Ben Shapiro to release the single "Facts". In April 2024, MacDonald released an 8-minute-long song called "God Mode". In the song MacDonald acknowledges past struggles such as his alcohol addiction, and he also addresses criticism. In June 2024, Mac Lethal released a diss track called "Tom MacDonald is a Nazi", after MacDonald allegedly sneak dissed him. MacDonald did not respond.

On July 14, 2024, MacDonald released the song "You Missed" which was written in response to an assassination attempt on Donald Trump at a Pennsylvania rally the day prior. The song reached number one spot on the iTunes chart that night. On November 1, 2024, which was 4 days before the 2024 United States presidential election, MacDonald collaborated with Rockafeller to release the song "Goodbye Joe", to celebrate Joe Biden's Presidency coming to an end. The song debuted at number one on Billboard's digital song sales chart, selling 12,000 downloads in the US by November 7.

On January 17, 2025, MacDonald released the single "Daddy's Home", featuring comedian Roseanne Barr, to celebrate Trump's second inauguration which was set to happen in few days. On April 25, MacDonald released the album Proud to Be a Problem, which featured a single of the same title, as well as the singles, "Can't Cancel All Of Us", "Man In the Sky", "Superman", and "Goodbye Joe". On August 15, MacDonald released the single "The Devil Is A Democrat". It reached 4 million views on YouTube within two weeks and reached the number one spot on Billboard's Digital Song Sales chart.

On September 11, MacDonald released the single "Charlie" in honor of Charlie Kirk, an American right-wing political activist who was assassinated the day prior while speaking at a public debate event at Utah Valley College. The music video for "Charlie" reached the number-one spot on YouTube's trending music chart. By September 18, "Charlie" had reached 8.2 million views on YouTube. After its first week, the song reached the number one spot on Billboard's Digital Song Sales chart. On November 7, MacDonald released the album Truthurts, which featured the singles "The Devil Is A Democrat", "Facts", "Charlie", and "Daddy's Home". That same day he also released the album No Lies, which featured the singles "God Mode", "Everybody Needs Me", and "Me vs. You".

=== 2026: Declassified ===
On March 13, 2026, MacDonald released a compilation album titled Declassified which reached number 18 on the UK Album Downloads Chart.

== Influences ==
MacDonald has cited the Beatles, Pink Floyd, Led Zeppelin, Black Sabbath, Joe Cocker, Janis Joplin, Marilyn Manson, Tupac Shakur, Eminem, Aerosmith, GG Allin, Kanye West, and the Offspring as musical influences. His music often discusses controversial social and political topics in the United States, and around the world.

== Public image ==
MacDonald has created a significant online presence among right-wingers, becoming one of the most prominent figures on the "MAGA rap" scene. Writing for Vice, Drew Millard described MacDonald as "turgid", and wrote that he rose to fame by "taking the undercooked platitudes of the Intellectual Dark Web and filtering them into songs", adding that he "can feel like an unstoppable force of reactionary dumbness". Ariana Thompson of Inked described MacDonald as "one of the most divisive personas hip-hop has ever seen" and wrote that his right-wing fanbase "cling[s] onto every word he utter[s]". In a Rolling Stone profile, MacDonald said he wants to "show people I'm not just some brainwashed right-wing zombie." For the Dallas Observer, Garrett Gravley criticized his songs as "white victim complex anthems" and wrote that they gave him "status among zoomer Trump supporters as an oracle of sorts".

== Political views ==
In 2024, MacDonald said he neither supports Republicans nor Democrats, calling both "liars", but that he believes "that Donald Trump truly wants what's best for this country".

MacDonald has seemingly criticized abortion several times in his music. In his 2020 song "People So Stupid", he raps, "Tell me how this works, bacteria is life on Mars but a heartbeat isn't life on Earth?". In his 2021 song "Snowflakes", he raps, "You think taking guns away will save our kids from the killings, but your pro-choice abortion kills way more children".

== Personal life ==
After struggling with alcoholism for many years, MacDonald had what he calls a "bad breakdown" in 2016 that prompted him to spend nine months at his parents' house self-rehabilitating. During that time MacDonald began making plans to move to the United States. A few days after finishing rehabilitation he received a call from his immigration lawyer to let him know that his visa had been approved, and less than a week later, MacDonald moved to Los Angeles County, California.

After moving to Los Angeles, MacDonald reconnected with an old friend and fellow Canadian rapper, Nova Rockafeller. The two began dating and moved into an apartment together in the Crenshaw neighborhood of south Los Angeles. MacDonald described their living situation in Crenshaw as "grim," saying they lived in poverty which caused them to struggle to pay for both rent and groceries, and that their house had leaks and a roach infestation. Fortunately, according to MacDonald, he began making more money following the success of his song "Dear Rappers." The two married in 2026.

== Discography ==
=== Studio albums ===
List of studio albums with details
| Title | Details | Peak chart positions | |
| Title | Details | CAN | US |
|---|---|---|---|
| All Growed Up (as Mr. MacDonald) | Released: December 15, 2012; Label: Self-released; Format: CD, digital download | — | — |
| See You Tomorrow | Released: December 21, 2015; Label: Self-released; Format: Digital download | — | — |
| Deathreats | Released: August 1, 2018; Label: Self-released; Format: CD | — | — |
| Ghostories | Released: August 30, 2019; Label: Self-released; Format: CD | — | — |
| Killing the Neighbors (with Madchild) | Released: February 15, 2020; Label: Self-released; Format: CD | — | — |
| Gravestones | Released: August 14, 2020; Label: Self-released; Format: CD | — | — |
| As Far as the Stars (with Nova Rockafeller and Brandon Hart) | Released: April 9, 2021; Label: Self-released; Format: CD | — | — |
| Us Against the World | Released: September 3, 2021; Label: Self-released; Format: CD | — | — |
| The Brave (with Adam Calhoun) | Released: February 18, 2022; Label: Self-released; Format: CD, digital download | 83 | 14 |
| Renegade | Released: November 18, 2022; Label: Self-released; Format: CD | — | — |
| The Revolution | Released: November 18, 2022; Label: Self-released; Format: CD | — | — |
| The Brave 2 (with Adam Calhoun) | Released: September 8, 2023; Label: Self-released; Format: CD, digital download | — | 62 |
| Yesterday (with Nova Rockafeller) | Released: October 18, 2024; Label: Self-released; Format: CD | — | — |
| Wild Ones (with Nova Rockafeller) | Released: October 18, 2024; Label: Self-released; Format: CD, digital download | — | — |
| Proud to Be a Problem | Released: April 25, 2025; Label: Self-released; Format: CD | — | — |
| Truthurts | Released: November 7, 2025; Label: Self-released; Format: CD, USB | — | — |
| Fear the Free | Scheduled: November 13, 2026; Label: Self-released; Format: CD, USB | | |

=== Mixtapes ===
List of mixtapes, with selected details
| Title | Album details |
|---|---|
| Killville (as TMax) | Released: 2008; Label: Self-released; Format: CD, digital download |
| Young and Crazy (as T Mac) | Released: 2009; Label: Self-released; Format: CD, digital download |
| Creature from the Rap Lagoon (as T Mac) | Released: October 29, 2009; Label: Self-released; Format: CD, digital download |
| Feet Up (with O.V Charbonneau) | Released: 2011 (Note: Possibly never released); Label: Self-released; Format: Digital download |
| Infidelity in the Throne Room | Released: December 15, 2012; Label: Self-released; Format: CD, digital download |
| Bad Dream Mad Again | Released: June 1, 2013; Label: Self-released; Format: Digital download |
| LeeAnn's Son | Released: June 1, 2014; Label: Self-released; Format: Digital download |
| Bad Dream Mad Again II | Released: November 20, 2014; Label: Self-released; Format: Digital download |
| Dream People & the Whiskey Wars | Released: December 21, 2015; Label: Self-released; Format: Digital download |
| Flowers for the Dead | Released: August 14, 2020; Label: Self-released; Format: CD |
| No Guts No Glory | Released: September 3, 2021; Label: Self-released; Format: CD |
| No Lies | Released: November 7, 2025; Label: Self-released; Format: CD, USB |

=== EPs ===
| Title | EP details |
|---|---|
| MacBeth | Released: March 22, 2015; Label: Self-released; Format: Digital download |
| Therapy | Released: March 13, 2017; Label: Self-released; Format: CD, digital download |

=== Compilations ===
| Title | Album details |
|---|---|
| Something Like the Truth | Released: November 13, 2013; Label: Self-released; Format: Digital download |
| All of Me | Released: March 13, 2017; Label: Self-released; Format: Digital download |
| Declassified (Note: Compilation except for single 'Anti') | Released: March 13, 2026; Label: Self-released; Format: Digital download |

=== Singles ===
==== As lead artist ====
| Title | Year | Peak chart positions | | | | | | | Album |
| Title | Year | CAN | HUN | NZ Hot | US | US R&B /HH | US Rock | WW | Album |
|---|---|---|---|---|---|---|---|---|---|
| "Dear Rappers" | 2017 | — | — | — | — | — | — | — | Deathreats |
| "Castles" (featuring Sniima Beats) | 2017 | — | — | — | — | — | — | — | Deathreats |
| "Helluvit" | 2018 | — | — | — | — | — | — | — | Deathreats |
| "Hangman" | 2018 | — | — | — | — | — | — | — | Deathreats |
| "Whiteboy" | 2018 | — | — | — | — | — | — | — | Deathreats |
| "This House" | 2018 | — | — | — | — | — | — | — | Deathreats |
| "American Dreamz" | 2018 | — | — | — | — | — | — | — | Deathreats |
| "Exposure" | 2018 | — | — | — | — | — | — | — | Deathreats |
| "Politically Incorrect" | 2018 | — | — | — | — | — | — | — | Deathreats |
| "Everybody Hates Me" | 2018 | — | — | — | — | — | — | — | Ghostories |
| "I Wish" | 2019 | — | — | — | — | — | — | — | Ghostories |
| "Sad Rappers" | 2019 | — | — | — | — | — | — | — | Ghostories |
| "Straight White Male" | 2019 | — | — | — | — | — | — | — | Ghostories |
| "Lethal Injection" | 2019 | — | — | — | — | — | — | — | —N/a |
| "Mac Lethal Sucks" | 2019 | — | — | — | — | — | — | — | —N/a |
| "If I Was Black" | 2019 | — | — | — | — | — | — | — | Ghostories |
| "Buttholes" | 2019 | — | — | — | — | — | — | — | Ghostories |
| "I'm Sorry" | 2019 | — | — | — | — | — | — | — | Ghostories |
| "Ashes" | 2019 | — | — | — | — | — | — | — | Ghostories |
| "Cloned Rappers" | 2019 | — | — | — | — | — | — | — | Flowers for the Dead |
| "Trying to Kill Me" | 2019 | — | — | — | — | — | — | — | Ghostories |
| "Fake Fans" | 2019 | — | — | — | — | — | — | — | Ghostories |
| "I Hate Hip Hop" | 2019 | — | — | — | — | — | — | — | Gravestones |
| "Famous" | 2019 | — | — | — | — | — | — | — | Ghostories |
| "White Trash" (with Madchild) | 2020 | — | — | — | — | — | — | — | Killing the Neighbors |
| "Sober" (with Madchild featuring Nova Rockafeller) | 2020 | — | — | — | — | — | — | — | Killing the Neighbors |
| "Bad News" (with Madchild featuring Nova Rockafeller) | 2020 | — | — | — | — | — | — | — | Killing the Neighbors |
| "D.R.U.G." (with Madchild) | 2020 | — | — | — | — | — | — | — | Killing the Neighbors |
| "I Don't Care" | 2020 | — | — | — | — | — | — | — | Flowers for the Dead |
| "Coronavirus" | 2020 | — | — | — | — | — | — | — | Flowers for the Dead |
| "Blame the Rappers" (featuring Dax) | 2020 | — | — | — | — | — | — | — | Gravestones |
| "I Don't Drink" | 2020 | — | — | — | — | — | — | — | Flowers for the Dead |
| "I Can't Sleep" | 2020 | — | — | — | — | — | — | — | Flowers for the Dead |
| "No Response" | 2020 | — | — | — | — | — | — | — | Gravestones |
| "My Fans" | 2020 | — | — | — | — | — | — | — | Flowers for the Dead |
| "The Music Industry" | 2020 | — | — | — | — | — | — | — | Gravestones |
| "People So Stupid" | 2020 | — | — | — | — (Note: "People So Stupid" did not enter the Billboard Hot 100 chart, but peaked at number 9 on the Digital Song Sales chart.) | — (Note: "People So Stupid" did not enter the Hot R&B/Hip-Hop Songs chart, but peaked at number 5 on the R&B/Hip-Hop Digital Song Sales chart.) | — | — | Gravestones |
| "I'm Corny" | 2020 | — | — | — | — | — | — | — | Gravestones |
| "Gravestones" | 2020 | — | — | — | — | — | — | — | Gravestones |
| "Cancer" | 2020 | — | — | — | — | — | — | — | Gravestones |
| "No Lives Matter" | 2020 | — | — | — | — (Note: "No Lives Matter" did not enter the Billboard Hot 100 chart, but peaked at number 25 on the Digital Song Sales chart.) | — (Note: "No Lives Matter" did not enter the Hot R&B/Hip-Hop Songs chart, but peaked at number 4 on the R&B/Hip-Hop Digital Song Sales chart.) | — | — | Us Against the World |
| "Sellout" | 2020 | — | — | — | — | — | — | — | Gravestones |
| "Best Rapper Ever" | 2020 | — | — | — | — (Note: "Best Rapper Ever" did not enter the Billboard Hot 100 chart, but peaked at number 38 on the Digital Song Sales chart.) | — (Note: "Best Rapper Ever" did not enter the Hot R&B/Hip-Hop Songs chart, but peaked at number 7 on the R&B/Hip-Hop Digital Song Sales chart.) | — | — | Us Against the World |
| "Angels" | 2020 | — | — | — | — | — | — | — | No Guts No Glory |
| "Fake Woke" | 2021 | — | — | — | 96 | 35 | — | — | Us Against the World |
| "Cancelled" | 2021 | — | — | — | — (Note: "Cancelled" did not enter the Billboard Hot 100 chart, but peaked at number 13 on the Digital Song Sales chart.) | — (Note: "Cancelled" did not enter the Hot R&B/Hip-Hop Songs chart, but peaked at number 7 on the R&B/Hip-Hop Digital Song Sales chart.) | — | — | No Guts No Glory |
| "Clown World" | 2021 | — | 27 | — | — (Note: "Clown World" did not enter the Billboard Hot 100 chart, but peaked at number 11 on the Bubbling Under Hot 100 chart.) | 48 | — | — | No Guts No Glory |
| "No Good Bastards" (with Nova Rockafeller and Brandon Hart) | 2021 | — | — | — | — (Note: "No Good Bastards" did not enter on the Billboard Hot 100 chart, but peaked at number 15 on the Billboard Digital Songs Sales chart.) | — (Note: 'No Good Bastards" did not enter on the Hot R&B/Hip Hop Songs chart, but peaked at number 4 on the Rap Digital Songs Sales chart.) | 20 | — | As Far as the Stars |
| "Church" (with Brandon Hart featuring Nova Rockafeller) | 2021 | — | — | — | — (Note: "Church" did not enter on the Billboard Hot 100 chart, but peaked at number 23 on the Billboard Digital Songs Sales chart.) | — (Note: "Church" did not enter on the Hot R&B/Hip Hop Songs chart, but peaked at number 4 on the Rap Digital Songs Sales chart.) | 29 | — | As Far as the Stars |
| "Heart Emojis" (with Brandon Hart featuring Nova Rockafeller) | 2021 | — | — | — | — | — (Note: "Heart Emojis" did not enter on the Hot R&B/Hip Hop Songs chart, but peaked at number 4 on the Rap Digital Songs Sales chart.) | 45 | — | As Far as the Stars |
| "Dear Slim" | 2021 | — | 15 | — | — (Note: "Dear Slim" did not enter the Billboard Hot 100 chart, but peaked at number 10 on the Bubbling Under Hot 100 chart.) | — (Note: "Dear Slim" did not enter the Hot R&B/Hip-Hop Songs chart, but peaked at number 5 on the R&B/Hip-Hop Digital Songs Sales chart.) | — | — | Us Against the World |
| "Snowflakes" | 2021 | — | — | — | 71 | 31 | — | 197 | Us Against the World |
| "Don't Look Down" | 2021 | — | 39 | — | — | — (Note: "Don't Look Down" did not enter the Hot R&B/Hip-Hop Songs chart, but peaked at number 4 on the R&B/Hip-Hop Digital Songs Sales chart.) | — | — | No Guts No Glory |
| "Withdrawals" | 2021 | — | — | — | — | — (Note: "Withdrawals" did not enter the Hot R&B/Hip-Hop Songs chart, but peaked at number 14 on the R&B/Hip-Hop Digital Songs Sales chart.) | — | — | No Guts No Glory |
| "Brainwashed" | 2021 | — | — | — | 89 | 31 | 11 | — | No Guts No Glory |
| "Dummies" | 2021 | — | — | — | — | — | — | — | Us Against the World |
| "America" | 2021 | — | — | — | — (Note: "America" did not enter the Billboard Hot 100 chart, but peaked at number 20 on the Bubbling Under Hot 100 chart.) | — (Note: "America" did not enter the Hot R&B/Hip-Hop Songs chart, but peaked at number 1 on the R&B/Hip-Hop Digital Songs Sales chart.) | — | — | Us Against the World |
| "Balloons" | 2021 | — | — | — | — (Note: "Balloons" did not enter the Billboard Hot 100 chart, but peaked at number 8 on the Digital Song Sales chart.) | — (Note: "Balloons" did not enter the Hot R&B/Hip-Hop Songs chart, but peaked at number 1 on the R&B/Hip-Hop Digital Song Sales chart.) | — | — | Us Against the World |
| "Naked" | 2021 | — | — | — | — (Note: "Naked" did not enter the Billboard Hot 100 chart, but peaked at number 35 on the Digital Song Sales chart.) | — (Note: "Naked" did not enter the Hot R&B/Hip-Hop Songs chart, but peaked at number 4 on the R&B/Hip-Hop Digital Song Sales chart.) | — | — | The Revolution |
| "New World Order" (with Adam Calhoun) | 2022 | — | — | — | — (Note: "New World Order" did not enter the Billboard Hot 100 chart, but peaked at number 6 on the Digital Song Sales chart.) | — (Note: "New World Order" did not enter the Hot R&B/Hip-Hop Songs chart, but peaked at number 1 on the R&B/Hip-Hop Digital Song Sales chart.) | — | — | The Brave |
| "Whiteboyz" (with Adam Calhoun) | 2022 | — | — | — | — | — | — | — | The Brave |
| "In God We Trust" (with Adam Calhoun, Struggle Jennings and Nova Rockafeller) | 2022 | — | — | — | — | — | — | — | The Brave |
| "Fire Emojis" (with Adam Calhoun and Madchild) | 2022 | — | — | — | — | — | — | — | The Brave |
| "The System" | 2022 | — | — | — | — (Note: "The System" did not enter the Billboard Hot 100 chart, but peaked at number nine on the Digital Song Sales chart.) | — (Note: "The System" did not enter the Hot R&B/Hip-Hop Songs chart, but peaked at number four on the R&B/Hip-Hop Digital Song Sales chart.) | — | — | Renegade |
| "Scars" | 2022 | — | — | — | — (Note: "Scars" did not enter the Billboard Hot 100 chart, but peaked at number 9 on the Digital Song Sales chart.) | — (Note: "People So Stupid" did not enter the Hot R&B/Hip-Hop Songs chart, but peaked at number 5 on the R&B/Hip-Hop Digital Song Sales chart.) | — | — | The Revolution |
| "Names" | 2022 | — | — | — | — (Note: "Names" did not enter the Billboard Hot 100 chart, but peaked at number 5 on the Digital Song Sales chart.) | — (Note: "Names" did not enter the Hot R&B/Hip-Hop Songs chart, but peaked at number 2 on the R&B/Hip-Hop Digital Song Sales chart.) | — | — | The Revolution |
| "Riot" | 2022 | — | — | — | — | — | — | — | Renegade |
| "Sheeple" | 2022 | — | — | — | — | — | 33 | — | Renegade |
| "Fighter" | 2022 | — | — | — | — | — | — | — | Renegade |
| "Ghost" | 2022 | — | — | — | — | — | — | — | The Revolution |
| "End of the World" (with John Rich) | 2023 | — | — | — | — | — | — | — | —N/a (Note: "End of the World" featuring John Rich has not been included on any album to date. However, "End of the World" sung exclusively by Tom MacDonald is on Renegade as Track 6.) |
| "American Flags" (with Adam Calhoun) | 2023 | — | — | — | — (Note: "American Flags" did not enter the Billboard Hot 100 chart, but peaked at number four on the Bubbling Under Hot 100 chart, and No. 2 on the Digital Songs chart.) | 43 | — | — | The Brave 2 |
| "Your America" (with Adam Calhoun) | 2023 | — | — | — | — (Note: "Your America" did not enter the Billboard Hot 100 chart, but reached at number 9 on the Digital Songs chart.) | — (Note: "Your America" did not enter the Hot R&B/Hip-Hop Songs chart, but reached number 1 on the R&B/Hip-Hop Digital Song Sales chart.) | — | — | The Brave 2 |
| "Black and White" (with Adam Calhoun and Dax) | 2023 | — | — | — | — | — | — | — | The Brave 2 |
| "Race War" (with Adam Calhoun) | 2023 | — | — | — | — | — | — | — | The Brave 2 |
| "Chrome" (with Adam Calhoun and Nova Rockafeller) | 2023 | — | — | — | — | — | — | — | The Brave 2 |
| "Superman" | 2023 | — | — | — | — | — | — | — | Proud to Be a Problem |
| "Stronger Version" | 2023 | — | — | — | — | — | — | — | No Lies |
| "Facts" (featuring Ben Shapiro) | 2024 | 42 | — | — | 16 | 8 | — | 30 | Truthurts |
| "The Machine" | 2024 | — | — | — | — | — | — | — | Renegade |
| "God Mode" | 2024 | — | — | — | — | — | — | — | No Lies |
| "Me Vs. You" | 2024 | — | — | — | — | — | — | — | No Lies |
| "Heroes" | 2024 | — | — | — | — | — | — | — | Us Against the World |
| "You Missed" | 2024 | — | — | — | — | — | — | — | Thruthurts |
| "Everybody Needs Me" | 2024 | — | — | — | — | — | — | — | No Lies |
| "We Ain't Cowboys" (with Nova Rockafeller) | 2024 | — | — | — | — | — | — | — | Wild Ones |
| "Danger" (with Nova Rockafeller) | 2024 | — | — | — | — | — | — | — | Wild Ones |
| "Goodbye Joe" (with Nova Rockafeller) | 2024 | — | — | — | — | — | — | — | Proud to Be a Problem |
| "Wild Horses" (with Nova Rockafeller) | 2024 | — | — | — | — | — | — | — | Wild Ones |
| "Daddy's Home" (featuring Roseanne Barr) | 2025 | — | — | — | — | — | — | — | Truthurts |
| "Man In The Sky" | 2025 | — | — | — | — | — | — | — | Proud To Be A Problem |
| "Can't Cancel All Of Us" | 2025 | — | — | — | — | — | — | — | Proud To Be A Problem |
| "Proud To Be A Problem" | 2025 | — | — | — | — | — | — | — | Proud To Be A Problem |
| "Whiteboy Sh*t" | 2025 | — | — | — | — | — | — | — | No Lies |
| "The Devil Is A Democrat" | 2025 | — | — | — | — | — | — | — | Truthurts |
| "Charlie" | 2025 | — | — | 29 | 77 | 12 | — | — | Truthurts |
| "Woke World" | 2025 | — | — | — | — | — | — | — | Truthurts |
| "All My Haters" | 2025 | — | — | — | — | — | — | — | Truthurts |
| "Pray For The Left" | 2026 | — | — | — | — | — | — | — | —N/a |
| "Anti" | 2026 | — | — | — | — | — | — | — | Declassified |
| "Remember Who You Are" | 2026 | — | — | — | — | — | — | — | —N/a |
| "Us In The USA" | 2026 | — | — | — | — | — | — | — | —N/a |
| "The Government" | 2026 | — | — | — | — | — | — | — | —N/a |
| "What America Is" | 2026 | — | — | — | — | — | — | — | —N/a |
| “Talk to God” | 2026 | — | — | — | — | — | — | — | |
"—" denotes a recording that did not chart or was not released in that territory.

==== As a featured artist ====
| Title | Year | Peak chart positions | Album |
| Title | Year | US R&B/HH Dig. | Album |
|---|---|---|---|
| "Dark Side of the Moon" (Rp Matt Brevner featuring Tom MacDonald) | 2014 | — | —N/a |
| "Pillz" (Rp Jesus featuring GFBF, Nova Rockafeller and Tom MacDonald) | 2017 | — | —N/a |
| "WxWxw" (Fleshxfur featuring Tom MacDonald and Illvibe) | 2018 | — | —N/a |
| "Travelers" (Ryan Upchurch featuring Tom MacDonald and Struggle Jennings) | 2019 | — | —N/a |
| "Gang Gang" (Nova Rockafeller featuring Tom MacDonald) | 2021 | — | Scared of Heights |
| "Propaganda" (Dax featuring Tom MacDonald) | 2021 | 15 | Pain Paints Paintings |
| "Space Trash" (Brandon Hart and Tom MacDonald) | 2023 | — | |
