= Charlie (Tom MacDonald song) =

2025 single by Tom MacDonald

Single by Tom MacDonald
- Released: September 11, 2025
- Recorded: September 10, 2025
- Genre: Political hip-hop
- Length: 2:29
- Songwriter: Tom MacDonald
- Producer: MacDonald

Tom MacDonald singles chronology
"The Devil Is a Democrat" (2025)	"Charlie" (2025)	"Woke World" (2025)

Music video
- "Charlie" on YouTube

"Charlie" is a single by Canadian rapper Tom MacDonald. It was released on September 11, 2025, and is a tribute to American right-wing political activist Charlie Kirk, who was assassinated a day earlier.

== Content ==
In the song, MacDonald directs his anger toward leftists and third-wave liberals collectively. He blames them for Kirk's death and accuses them of celebrating it, claiming that "woke people are the terrorists". MacDonald imagines Kirk looking down from a window in Heaven as his children grow up, and the right-wing community uniting to avenge his death.

== Commercial performance ==
The song debuted at number 2 on Billboard's Digital Song Sales chart shortly after its release, with 6,700 downloads sold in the last hours of that tracking week. It then sold 17,900 downloads in the week of September 12–18 and became his eighth No. 1 song on Digital Song Sales in the week ending on September 27. The song also entered the Billboard Hot 100 and Hot R&B/Hip-Hop Songs charts at numbers 77 and 12 respectively. The song also reached number 1 on YouTube Music's charts.

== Charts ==
Chart performance for "Charlie"
Chart (2025)	Peak position
New Zealand Hot Singles (RMNZ)	29
UK Singles Downloads (Official Charts)	10
US Billboard Hot 100	77
US Hot R&B/Hip-Hop Songs (Billboard)	12

== See also ==
- "Jesus Is Coming Back Soon", a pop/rock song by Forrest Frank and Josiah Queen
- "We Are Charlie Kirk", an AI-generated gospel song by SPALEXMA
