= Creeker =

Ryan Upchurch album

Studio album by Upchurch
- Released: February 12, 2018
- Recorded: 2017
- Genres: Hard rock; southern rock; hick hop
- Label: Redneck Nation

Upchurch chronology
King of Dixie (2017)	Creeker (2018)	Supernatural (2018)

Professional ratings
Review scores
Source	Rating
AllMusic	3/5 stars

Creeker is the sixth full-length studio album by American musician Ryan Upchurch. It shows Upchurch focusing on hard rock and southern rock rather than the country or rap songs he is normally known for. It was released on February 12, 2018 via Redneck Nation Records. The album debuted at number 35 on the Billboard 200 albums chart in the United States. It also peaked at No. 5 on the Top Country Albums chart and No. 6 on the Top Rock Albums chart.

Its sequel, Creeker II, was released on April 20, 2019.

== Track listing ==
No.	Title	Length
1.	"Spotlight"	2:52
2.	"Rattlin Chains"	2:31
3.	"Blow My Smoke"	3:22
4.	"Pond Creek Road"	2:44
5.	"How High"	3:40
6.	"Dirty South"	2:49
7.	"Burnin"	2:34
8.	"Bells"	3:23
9.	"Phantom of the Pines"	2:48
10.	"Llewellyn"	2:48

== Charts ==
Chart (2017)	Peak position
US Billboard 200	35
US Top Country Albums (Billboard)	5
US Top Rock Albums (Billboard)	6
US Digital Albums (Billboard)	5
US Independent Albums (Billboard)	3
