= Creeker II =

Ryan Upchurch album

Studio album by Upchurch
- Released: April 20, 2019
- Recorded: 2019
- Genre: Hard rock
- Length: 33:06
- Label: Redneck Nation
- Producer: Bobby Naklicki (exec.); Ryan Upchurch (exec.); Thomas "Stoner" Toner (also exec.)

Upchurch chronology
River Rat (2018)	Creeker II (2019)	Parachute (2019)

Professional ratings
Review scores
Source	Rating
AllMusic	3/5 stars

Creeker II is the ninth full-length studio album by American country rap artist Ryan Upchurch. It was released on April 20, 2019 through Redneck Nation Records, serving as a sequel to his rock-oriented sixth album Creeker (2018). It displays even more hard rock influences than its predecessor. It was announced via Twitter and YouTube by Upchurch in March 2019. The album was produced by Thomas "Greenway" Toner a.k.a. T-Stoner and features contributions from guitarist/co-writer Travis Tidwell and drummer Kidd Petersen.

The album debuted at number 66 on the Billboard 200, No. 7 on the Top Country Albums chart and No. 10 on the Top Rock Albums chart in the United States.

== Track listing ==
adapted from iTunes

No.	Title	Length
1.	"Animal"	2:32
2.	"Gassed Up"	2:37
3.	"Ghost Ranch"	4:02
4.	"Nashvegas"	3:23
5.	"Alcoholic Shrink"	3:34
6.	"Hillbilly Psycho"	4:10
7.	"Forever Fame"	2:21
8.	"Legend of the South"	3:40
9.	"Dirty Elvis"	2:32
10.	"Blue Moon"	4:15

== Charts ==
Chart (2019)	Peak position
US Billboard 200	66
US Top Country Albums (Billboard)	7
US Top Rock Albums (Billboard)	10
US Digital Albums (Billboard)	2
US Independent Albums (Billboard)	4
