= Parachute (Upchurch album) =

Ryan Upchurch album

Studio album by Upchurch
- Released: September 24, 2019
- Recorded: 2019
- Genre: Country rap
- Label: Redneck Nation
- Producer: Ryan Upchurch (exec.); Thomas "Stoner" Toner (also exec.)

Upchurch chronology
Creeker II (2019)	Parachute (2019)	Hooligan (2019)

Professional ratings
Review scores
Source	Rating
AllMusic	3.5/5 stars

Parachute is the tenth full-length studio album by American country rap artist Ryan Upchurch. It was released on September 24, 2019, through Redneck Nation Records. The album debuted at number 52 on the Billboard 200, No. 6 on the Top Country Albums chart and No. 23 on the Top Rap Albums chart in the United States.

== Track listing ==
adapted from iTunes

No.	Title	Length
1.	"Fallen" (featuring Mama Church)	3:24
2.	"Parachute"	3:19
3.	"One of Them Buddies"	2:57
4.	"West Side" (featuring Struggle Jennings)	3:27
5.	"Holler Boys"	3:31
6.	"No One Told Us"	3:03
7.	"Dance with the Devil" (featuring Katie Noel & Chucky V.)	4:04
8.	"Some Days"	3:02
9.	"Huckleberry"	3:12
10.	"Wake Me Up"	4:10

== Charts ==
Chart (2019)	Peak position
US Billboard 200	52
US Top Country Albums (Billboard)	6
US Top Rap Albums (Billboard)	23
US Digital Albums (Billboard)	4
US Independent Albums (Billboard)	4
