= River Rat (album) =

Ryan Upchurch album

Studio album by Upchurch
- Released: December 21, 2018
- Recorded: in Nashville, Tennessee
- Genre: Country rap
- Label: Redneck Nation
- Producers: Ryan Upchurch (exec.); Bobby Naklicki (exec.); Thomas "Stoner" Toner (also exec.)

Upchurch chronology
Supernatural (2018)	River Rat (2018)	Creeker II (2019)

Professional ratings
Review scores
Source	Rating
AllMusic	3/5 stars

River Rat is the eighth full-length studio album by American country rap artist Ryan Upchurch. It was released on December 21, 2018 via Redneck Nation Records. It was recorded in Nashville, Tennessee and produced by Thomas "Greenway" Toner a.k.a. T-Stoner.

The album peaked at number 191 on the Billboard 200 albums chart and at number 21 on the Top Country Albums chart in the United States

== Track listing ==
No.	Title	Length
1.	"Intro" (Skit)	1:29
2.	"Dukes of Hazzard"	2:08
3.	"Yz"	2:49
4.	"C.H.E.A.T.H.A.M."	2:19
5.	"River Rat Defined" (Skit)	0:47
6.	"River Rat"	2:04
7.	"Cornbread"	2:29
8.	"Hank Hill"	2:47
9.	"Don't Come Knockin"	3:24
10.	"Busy"	3:02
11.	"Steer Clear"	2:51
12.	"We Don't"	2:01

== Charts ==
Chart (2018)	Peak position
US Billboard 200	191
US Top Country Albums (Billboard)	21
US Digital Albums (Billboard)	10
US Independent Albums (Billboard)	3
