= King of Dixie =

Ryan Upchurch album

Studio album by Upchurch
- Released: October 18, 2017
- Genre: Country rap
- Label: Redneck Nation

Upchurch chronology
Son of the South (2017)	King of Dixie (2017)	Creeker (2018)

King of Dixie is the fifth full-length studio album by American country rap artist Ryan Upchurch. It was released on October 18, 2017 via Redneck Nation Records. It features guest appearances from JellyRoll and Robert James.

The album debuted at number 65 on the Billboard 200 albums chart in the United States. It also peaked at No. 10 on the Top Country Albums chart and No. 30 on the Top R&B/Hip-Hop Albums chart.

== Track listing ==
No.	Title	Length
1.	"Traveler"	2:46
2.	"White Lightning"	3:51
3.	"Legend"	3:41
4.	"Livin' in a Country Song"	3:43
5.	"Johnny Cash"	2:42
6.	"Conspiracy"	2:46
7.	"Tonight"	3:36
8.	"Tennessee Dreamin"	2:37
9.	"Tunnel Vision"	2:30
10.	"Redneck for Real"	3:00
11.	"Loveless" (featuring Robert James)	5:08
12.	"Radio Jam"	3:19
13.	"Running on Fumes" (featuring Jelly Roll)	2:17
14.	"Tore Up"	3:52
15.	"Bloodshed"	3:08
16.	"American Grown"	2:43
17.	"King of Dixie"	3:06
18.	"Go for It"	2:24
19.	"My Own Lane"	3:34

== Charts ==
Chart (2017)	Peak position
US Billboard 200	65
US Top Country Albums (Billboard)	10
US Top R&B/Hip-Hop Albums (Billboard)	30
US Digital Albums (Billboard)	5
US Independent Albums (Billboard)	3
