= Heart of America (album) =

Studio album by Upchurch
- Released: January 15, 2016
- Genre: Country rap
- Length: 28:35
- Label: RHEC Entertainment; Johnny Cashville, Inc.
- Producer: Johnny Cashville (exec.); DJ Dev; BandPlay; BB Swing; Clock Work; Kold Kut; Matic Lee; Super Staar

Upchurch chronology
Cheatham County EP (2015)	Heart of America (2016)	Chicken Willie (2016)

Heart of America is the debut full-length studio album by American country rap artist Ryan Upchurch. It was released on January 15, 2016 via RHEC Entertainment/Johnny Cashville, Inc. Production was handled by seven record producers: Kevin Grisham, BandPlay, BB Swing, Clock Work, Jonah Appleby, Super Staar, Travis Moore, with executive producer Johnny Cashville. It features guest appearances from Bubba Sparxxx, Luke Combs and Struggle Jennings. The album debuted at No. 30 on the Top Country Albums chart, No. 31 on the Independent Albums chart and No. 5 on the Heatseekers Albums chart in the United States.

== Track listing ==
No.	Title	Producer(s)	Length
1.	"Intro"		0:31
2.	"Shit Bubba"	Kevin "DJ Dev" Grisham	2:48
3.	"Black Smoke"	BB Swing	3:16
4.	"Keep It Country" (featuring Bubba Sparxxx)	Kevin "DJ Dev" Grisham	3:45
5.	"Hell Yeah"	Travis "Kold Kut" Moore	2:34
6.	"Skit"		0:34
7.	"Backwoods"	Band Play	3:51
8.	"Hourglass" (featuring Struggle Jennings)	Jonah "Matic Lee" Appleby	2:42
9.	"Struggle Phone Call"		0:34
10.	"Wheels"	Super Staar	3:19
11.	"Skit"		0:38
12.	"Outlaw" (featuring Luke Combs)	Clock Work	4:05
Total length:			28:35

== Charts ==
Chart (2016)	Peak position
US Top Country Albums (Billboard)	30
US Independent Albums (Billboard)	31
US Heatseekers Albums (Billboard)	5
