= Everlasting Country =

Studio album by Upchurch
- Released: April 20, 2020
- Genre: Country rap
- Label: Redneck Nation
- Producer: Thomas "Stoner" Toner

Upchurch chronology
Hooligan (2019)	Everlasting Country (2020)	Hideas: The Album (2021)

Professional ratings
Review scores
Source	Rating
AllMusic	4/5 stars

Everlasting Country is the eleventh full-length solo studio album by American country rap artist Ryan Upchurch. It was released on April 20, 2020 via Redneck Nation Records. Produced by Thomas "Greenway" Toner a.k.a. T-Stoner, who also plays drums on the album, it features contributions from Tyler Branch on guitar, Marquez Brown on bass, Eddy Dunlap on steel, Justin Saunders on cello, with guest vocals by Carly Rogers. The album peaked at number 61 on the Billboard 200 and at number six on both the Top Country Albums and the Independent Albums charts in the United States.

== Track listing ==
No.	Title	Length
1.	"Rollin Stoned II"	3:47
2.	"Tennessee"	3:23
3.	"Sonic Drive-In"	2:54
4.	"Everlasting Country"	3:27
5.	"Whippoorwill"	3:08
6.	"Stole the Show"	2:43
7.	"Slow Down"	3:06
8.	"Country Girls"	3:05
9.	"Step On It" (featuring Carly Rogers)	2:09
10.	"Sunshine Girl"	2:38
11.	"Roots Run Deep"	3:33

== Personnel ==
- Ryan Upchurch – vocals
- Carly Rogers – vocals (track 9)
- Thomas Toner – drums, producer, mixing
- Tyler Branch – guitar
- Marquez "Sage Tunz" Brown – bass
- Eddy Dunlap – steel
- Justin Saunders – cello
- Brandon Mosley – engineering assistant

== Charts ==
Chart (2020)	Peak position
US Billboard 200	61
US Top Country Albums (Billboard)	6
US Independent Albums (Billboard)	6
