= Supernatural (Upchurch album) =

Ryan Upchurch album

Studio album by Upchurch
- Released: August 19, 2018
- Recorded: in Nashville, Tennessee
- Genre: Country rap
- Label: Redneck Nation
- Producer: Thomas "Stoner" Toner

Upchurch chronology
Creeker (2018)	Supernatural (2018)	River Rat (2018)

Supernatural is the seventh full-length studio album by American country rap artist Ryan Upchurch. It was released on August 19, 2018 via Redneck Nation Records. It was recorded in Nashville, Tennessee and produced by Thomas "Greenway" Toner a.k.a. T-Stoner. The album features guest appearances from Rizzi Myers, Big Murph, Carly Rogers, Struggle Jennings and Trace Cyrus.

The album debuted at number 71 on the Billboard 200 albums chart in the United States. It peaked at No. 6 on the Top Country Albums chart and No. 40 on the Top R&B/Hip-Hop Albums chart.

Professional ratings
Review scores
Source	Rating
Allmusic	4/5 stars

== Track listing ==
No.	Title	Length
1.	"Supernatural"	2:48
2.	"The Tennessean" (featuring Struggle)	3:46
3.	"My Neck of the Woods"	3:22
4.	"Country Cut Celebrity"	3:04
5.	"No One" (featuring Rizzi Myers)	3:46
6.	"Who"	2:48
7.	"Frozen"	3:04
8.	"Cowboy" (featuring Carly Rogers)	3:50
9.	"Blah Blah" (featuring Big Murph)	3:06
10.	"Mohican"	3:26
11.	"Take My Hands" (featuring Trace Cyrus)	2:14
12.	"Empty Grave" (featuring Rizzi Myers)	4:14

== Charts ==
Chart (2018)	Peak position
US Billboard 200	71
US Top Country Albums (Billboard)	6
US Top R&B/Hip-Hop Albums (Billboard)	40
US Digital Albums (Billboard)	6
US Independent Albums (Billboard)	5
