= Adam Calhoun =

American rapper and singer (born 1980)

- Born: Adam Bradley Calhoun; September 5, 1980 (age 46); Chicago, Illinois
- Origin: New Lenox, Illinois
- Genres: Country rap; Midwest hip hop
- Occupations: Rapper; singer; songwriter; comedian; YouTuber
- Years active: 2017–present
- Children: 3
- Website: officialacal.com

Adam Bradley Calhoun (born September 5, 1980) is an American rapper, singer, songwriter, and YouTube vlogger. He is active as a social media personality and has released a number of albums. His most successful album was a collaborative project with Tom MacDonald, titled The Brave, released in 2022. The same year, he released another album named Country Rap Tunes. A sequel to The Brave, entitled The Brave 2, was released the following year.

== Music career ==
Calhoun started his music career performing with country rap singer, Chris Hosier. They released a single "Salute the Brave" in 2017, which reached No. 46 on Hot Country Songs. and they also released an album Made in America that year. He ended his collaboration with Hosier and started a solo career in 2018, and released AmerAcal. Later in the year he released his second album The Throne. A track in the album, "Racism", drew criticism for use of the racial slur "nigga" and stereotypes about white and black people. In a collaboration with fellow American country rapper/singer Upchurch with the song "Back N Forth", Calhoun notably raps about men wearing women's dresses.

He released an EP Crazy White Boy with Demun Jones. During their "Crazy White Boy Tour", their shows in Sacramento, California, were scheduled in the same weekend as the Sacramento Pride, which led to protests because of his social media posts on gay and trans people and song lyrics described as "racist". It resulted in those shows being cancelled. Other shows similarly faced protests and another show in Oklahoma City was canceled.

On July 18, 2019, Calhoun released his third solo album, War. The album was the second best-selling country album and the third best-selling rap album of the week, with 3,200 copies sold.

Calhoun has also collaborated with a number of other artists, including Upchurch on Hooligan released in 2019, and Struggle Jennings on Legend, released in 2020.

In 2022, Calhoun collaborated with Tom MacDonald to release an album, The Brave. The album was the best selling album the week of its release in March 2022, with 16,000 copies sold in the U.S. In September 2023, Calhoun and MacDonald released the album, The Brave II.

== Personal life ==
Calhoun has an adult son, Tamen, with a former girlfriend. He also has a daughter, Grae Millie, born in September 2021 and a son, LC William, born in March 2024, with his wife Margie.

Calhoun served time in prison for punching an on-duty police officer.

Calhoun has a YouTube channel with over 1.82 million subscribers as of November 2024, where he often expresses his political and social views, including his support for U.S. president Donald Trump.

In September 2026, Calhoun said he has voted three times in his life, each time for Donald Trump, and that he "voted for cheaper gas, cheaper groceries, and [...] no new wars", but got disappointed and "will never vote again", calling Republicans and Democrats "both the same thing" and "against us".

== Discography ==
=== Albums ===
Title	Album details	Peak chart positions						Sales
Title	Album details	US	US Country	US Heat	US Indie	US R&B/HH	Can	Sales
Made in America (with Chris Hosier)	Release date: December 1, 2017; Label: Redneckin Records; Formats: Digital download	—	—	6	46	—	—	
AmerAcal	Release date: March 13, 2018; Label: ACal; Formats: Digital download	—	13	1	4	—	—	US: 11,600
The Throne	Release date: November, 2018; Label: ACal; Formats: Digital download	—	21	1	4	—	—	US: 7,800
War	Release date: July 18, 2019; Label: ACal; Formats: Digital download, streaming	—	—	2	8	—	—	US: 3,200
Hooligan (with Upchurch)	Release date: November 25, 2019; Label: ACal / RHEC; Formats: Digital download, streaming	160	—	—	3	—	—	
Billy G.O.A.T.	Release date: March 24, 2020; Label: ACal; Formats: Digital download, streaming	—	—	8	47	—	—	
Legend (with Struggle Jennings)	Release date: June 9, 2020; Label: ACal / Angels & Outlaws; Formats: Digital download, streaming	—	—	18	—	—	—	
Pressure	Release date: January 22, 2021; Label: ACal; Formats: Digital download, streaming	—	—	7	—	—	—	
Outlaw Shxt (with Struggle Jennings)	Release date: April 30, 2021; Label: ACal / Angels & Outlaws; Formats: Digital download, streaming	—	—	4	—	—	—	
The Brave (with Tom MacDonald)	Release date: March 4, 2022; Label: Self-released; Formats: Digital download, streaming	14	—	—	4	9	83	US: 16,000
Country Rap Tunes	Release date: October 7, 2022; Label: ACal; Formats: Digital download, streaming	—	—	—	—	—	—	
The Brave 2 (with Tom MacDonald)	Release date: September 22, 2023; Label: Self-released; Formats: CD, Digital	62	—	—	—	—	—	
Pale Horse (with Mesus)	Release date: September 13, 2024; Label: ACal; Formats: Digital	—	—	—	—	—	—	
AmerAcal II	Release date: May 16, 2025; Label: ACal; Formats: Digital	—	—	—	—	—	—	
ACAL Forever	Release date: August 26, 2025; Label: ACal; Formats: Digital	—	—	—	—	—	—	
American Native	Release date: September 11, 2026; Label: ACal; Formats: Digital	—	—	—	—	—	—	

=== Extended plays ===
Title	EP details	Peak chart positions	
Title	EP details	US Heat	US Indie
Crazy White Boy (with Demun Jones)	Release date: February 11, 2019; Label: ACal; Formats: Digital download	1	10

=== Singles ===
Year	Title	Peak chart positions				Album
Year	Title	US Country	US R&B/Hip-Hop	US Digital	CAN Digital	Album
2017	"Salute the Brave" (with Hosier)	46	—	—	—	Made in America
2020	"The Patriot"	—	—	—	—	
2021	"Pictures"	—	—	—	—	
2022	"Gumbo"	—	— (Note: "Gumbo" did not enter the Hot R&B/Hip-Hop Songs chart, but reached number 18 on the R&B/Hip-Hop Digital Song Sales chart.)	—	—	
2022	"Ramble On"	—	— (Note: "Ramble On" did not enter the Hot R&B/Hip-Hop Songs chart, but reached number 14 on the R&B/Hip-Hop Digital Song Sales chart.)	—	—	
2023	"American Flags" (with Tom MacDonald)	—	43	2	8	
2023	"Your America" (with Tom MacDonald)	—	— (Note: "Your America" did not enter the Hot R&B/Hip-Hop Songs chart, but reached number 1 on the R&B/Hip-Hop Digital Song Sales chart.)	9	20	
