= Upchurch (musician) =

American musician (born 1991)

Ryan Upchurch
- Also known as: Upchurch, Upchurch the Redneck
- Born: Ryan Edward Upchurch; May 24, 1991 (age 35); Nashville, Tennessee
- Origin: Cheatham County, Tennessee
- Genres: Country rap; country; southern rock
- Occupations: singer; songwriter; comedian
- Years active: 2010–present
- Labels: Mud to Gold Entertainment; Luce-N-Up

Ryan Edward Upchurch (born May 24, 1991), known as Upchurch, is an American rapper, singer-songwriter, and comedian from Cheatham County, on the outskirts of Nashville. Upchurch became popular primarily as a comedian, creating videos on various platforms to appeal to people of similar interest. He sold merchandise based on his song title "Raise Hell and Eat Cornbread". Originally considered a "country rapper", Upchurch has diversified into many genres such as southern rock.

== Early life ==
Ryan Edward Upchurch was born in Nashville, Tennessee, and raised in Pegram within rural Cheatham County. He grew up on Pond Creek Road, describing his upbringing as that of a "good old boy" with strong ties to country life and rural Tennessee. His family operated a paint company and a chicken farm, facing financial struggles when work became scarce. He was raised by his mother, grandmother, and grandfather, and has stated his family holds strong, supportive values.

Growing up in a rural setting heavily influenced his music, as he drew inspiration from his surroundings and Southern experiences. Though surrounded by traditional country and rock influences, he grew up listening to rap music, often having to keep it hidden. Upchurch would drop out of Cheatham County Central High School to pursue other creative endeavors. Upchurch started rapping in early 2010, featuring on a remix of Big Page's "I'm Still Fly" produced by Lextronic. Before pursuing music full-time, Upchurch had a major interest in vehicles, often posting photos of cars on social media. He is also a long-time collector of Pokémon Cards, a hobby he has maintained for many years.

== Career ==
Upchurch began uploading videos to YouTube and Vine. In 2014, he and his friend Shade Glover created the humorous alter ego "Upchurch the Redneck" for their own entertainment. The character spoofed stereotypes of young men in the Deep South, and the videos quickly went viral, gaining over half a million fans in just four months. While his early content was primarily comedic, he began incorporating rap-influenced "hick-hop" videos into his content. He released his first extended play, Cheatham County, in 2015, followed by a full-length album, Heart of America, in 2016. Both releases reached the top 30 of the Billboard Top Country Albums chart. Heart of America sold 1,300 copies in its first week of release.

A then-rising Luke Combs appeared in the music video for Upchurch’s song "Outlaw". The video prominently featured Confederate battle flag imagery, including a decal on the acoustic guitar Combs was playing. During a Country Radio Seminar in February 2021, Combs publicly apologized for his past use of the imagery. He stated there was "no excuse" for the images and that he had since learned how painful that symbol can be to others. Upchurch immediately fired back on social media, calling Combs and other country stars "sissies" for "bowing down" to public pressure. He argued that the imagery represented Southern heritage rather than hate and felt Combs was being a "mainstream sellout" by distancing himself from his roots to appease record labels.

The second full-length album, Chicken Willie, was released in August 2016. It reached No. 22 on Billboard's Top Country Albums and No. 11 on the Rap Albums charts, selling 2,800 copies in the first week. In 2017, Upchurch released another EP titled Summer Love, which is completely country-oriented, with no elements of rap music; and another studio album titled Son of the South. Summer Love, debuted at No. 33 in the Top Country Albums chart with 3,700 copies sold, while Son of the South debuted at No. 29 with 48,100 copies sold. Upchurch's fifth studio album, King of Dixie, was released on November 10, 2017, and features 19 tracks. Upchurch's first rock album, Creeker, was released on April 20 which was focused on rock with few rap elements. His August 2018 release, Supernatural, a rap-focused album with some country elements, peaked at No. 6 on Billboard's Top Country Albums. His December 2018 album, River Rat, peaked at No. 22. The artist canceled a sold-out show at Alrosa Villa following neighborhood protests and flyers accusing him of promoting white supremacy and offensive rhetoric.

Upchurch released his next album, Creeker II in April 2019. Later that year, he released Parachute on September 24, followed by a collaboration album with Adam Calhoun entitled Hooligan on November 25. On April 20, 2020, Upchurch released his eleventh album Everlasting Country containing a more traditional country sound. It peaked at No. 61 on the Billboard 200 and No. 6 on the Country Albums chart. Country singer Kane Brown briefly went missing in August 2020 after getting lost in the woods on his property, and Upchurch claimed he helped find him instead of the local police.

In 2021, Upchurch founded his own record label Holler Boy Records with country singer-songwriter Chase Matthew being the first signee, partnering with ONErpm. The two released a popular remix of Lil Durk's country-rap song "Broadway Girls." The label became inactive in late 2022 when Matthew signed a major-label deal with Warner Records Nashville.

== Personal life ==
Upchurch has a daughter named Lilli'Anna Athena Upchurch, born in 2024.

== Legal issues ==
Between 2011 and 2013, Upchurch faced misdemeanor charges in Nashville, Tennessee, for alleged drug possession and driving with a suspended or revoked license. Records indicate that all listed cases were dismissed and subsequently closed.

Artist Jacob LeVeille sued Upchurch in Florida federal court for allegedly violating the Visual Artists Rights Act of 1990. The suit stemmed from a 2018 video showing Upchurch shooting at paintings created by LeVeille (depicting Upchurch and Johnny Cash) with an assault rifle. Upchurch argued his actions were "transformative" commentary, but a judge denied his motion for summary judgment in late 2021, citing material issues of fact. In April 2021, Upchurch was served with an order of protection in Cheatham County, Tennessee. This occurred the same day he donated his first gold record for the song "Southern Land" to the local sheriff's office. The case was reportedly dismissed in October 2021. A defamation lawsuit brought by officer Jeremy Wayne Long against defendants including Upchurch was dismissed after the court determined the officer failed to prove "actual malice".

Upchurch faced a federal defamation lawsuit filed in the Middle District of Tennessee by David Robertson and Daniel Rodni. The suit alleged Upchurch posted videos claiming the 2022 disappearance and death of 16-year-old Kiely Rodni was a "scam" to raise money via GoFundMe. In May 2024, a judge ruled that parts of the libel case could proceed. On May 18, 2026, a federal jury ordered Upchurch to pay $17.5 million after finding him liable for defamation and intentional infliction of emotional distress.

== Discography ==
Studio albums

- Heart of America (2016)
- Chicken Willie (2016)
- Bad Mutha Fucka (2016)
- Son of the South (2017)
- King of Dixie (2017)
- Creeker (2018)
- The Oven (with Demun Jones) (2018)
- Supernatural (2018)
- River Rat (2018)
- Creeker II (2019)
- Parachute (2019)
- Hooligan (with Adam Calhoun) (2019)
- Everlasting Country (2020)
- Hideas: The Album (2021)
- Mud to Gold (2021)
- Same Ol Same Ol (2021)
- People's Champ (2022)
- Pioneer (2023)
- Blue Genes (2023)
- Concert for the Crickets (2023)
- Blue Genes II (2024)
- Turbulence (2024)
- Creeker 3 (with The Dixielanders) (2025)
- Black Denim (with Chris Hosier) (2025)
- First Edition (Side A) (2026)
