= DJ Paul discography =

- Studio albums: 9
- Extended plays: 1
- Singles: 5
- Mixtapes: 14
- Collaborative albums: 1

The discography of American hip hop recording artist DJ Paul, consists of nine studio albums, one collaborative album, one extended play, five singles and 14 mixtapes.

== Albums ==
=== Studio albums ===
List of studio albums, with selected chart positions, sales figures and certifications
Title	Album details	Peak chart positions		
Title	Album details	US	US Rap	US R&B
Underground Volume 16: For Da Summa	Released: May 28, 2002; Label: Hypnotize Minds, Loud Records, D. Evil Music; Format: CD, LP, digital download	127	—	24
Scale-A-Ton	Released: May 5, 2009; Label: Hypnotize Minds, Scale-A-Ton; Format: CD, LP, digital download	157	10	26
A Person of Interest	Released: October 22, 2012; Label: Hypnotize Minds, Scale-A-Ton; Format: CD, LP, digital download	—	—	34
Volume 16: Original Masters	Released: November 26, 2013; Label: Scale-A-Ton; Format: CD, LP	—	—	—
Master of Evil	Released: October 30, 2015; Label: Psychopathic Records, Scale-A-Ton, Sony, Red Distribution; Format: CD, LP, digital download	—	23	32
YOTS: Year of the Six, Pt. 1	Released: October 28, 2016; Label: Scale-A-Ton, Slumerican; Format: CD, LP, Digital download	—	—	—
YOTS: Year of the Six, Pt. 2	Released: November 25, 2016; Label: Scale-A-Ton, Slumerican; Format: CD, LP, digital download	—	—	—
Underground Volume 17: For Da Summa	Released: September 15, 2017; Label: Scale-A-Ton; Format: CD, digital download	—	—	—
Goat of All Goats	Released: March 6, 2026; Label: Scale-A-Ton; Format: CD, digital download	—	—	—
"—" denotes a recording that did not chart or was not released in that territory.

=== Collaborative albums ===
List of collaborative albums, with selected chart positions
Title	Album details	Peak chart positions			
Title	Album details	US	US R&B/HH	US Rap	CAN
Music For The Funeral (with Kordhell)	Released: October 31, 2024; Label: Scale-A-Ton; Format: Digital download, streaming				

== Extended plays ==
- Power, Pleasure & Painful Things (2019)

== Mixtapes ==
List of mixtapes, with year released
Title	Album details
Volume 2: Da Exorcist (with Juicy J)	Released: 1994; Label: Self-released; Format: Cassette tape
The Weigh In	Released: March 19, 2009; Label: Self-released; Format: Digital download; Hosted By: DJ Scream
Too Kill Again	Released: March 16, 2010; Label: Self-released; Format: Digital download; Hosted By: DJ Scream, DJ Whoo Kid
Pray for Forgiveness (with Ya Boy & Lil Lody)	Released: May 19, 2011; Label: Self-released; Format: Digital download; Hosted By: DJ Scream
For I've Sinned	Released: April 19, 2012; Label: Self-released; Format: Digital download; Hosted By: DJ Scream, DJ Black
A Person of Interest Sampler	Released: October 8, 2012; Label: Self-released; Format: Digital download; Hosted By: Traps-N-Trunks
Clash of the Titans (with Drumma Boy)	Released: October 23, 2013; Label: Self-released; Format: Digital download; Hosted By: DJ Scream
Black Fall (with Yelawolf)	Released: October 31, 2013; Label: Self-released; Format: Digital download; Hosted By: DJ Whoo Kid
6ix Commandments (with Da Mafia 6ix)	Released: November 12, 2013; Label: Self-released; Format: Digital download; Hosted By: Trap-A-Holics
Hear Sum Evil (with Da Mafia 6ix)	Released: October 31, 2014; Label: Self-released; Format: Digital download; Hosted By: DJ Scream
Da Light Up, Da Poe Up	Released: August 18, 2015; Label: Self-released; Format: Digital download; Hosted By: No DJ
Mafia 4 Life	Released: August 15, 2016; Label: Format: Digital download (Datpiff & iTunes); Hosted By: DJ Scream
Da Reason: Thank Me Later	Released: August 21, 2017; Label: Self-released; Format: Digital download; Hosted By: Bigga Rankin
Slumafia (with Yelawolf)	Released: April 16, 2021; Label: Self-released; Format: Digital download
Crossfaded	Released: TBA; Label: Self-released; Format: Digital download
Watch What U Wish...: Remixes N Singles	Released: TBA; Label: Self-released; Format: Digital download

== Singles ==
=== As lead artist ===
List of singles, with selected chart positions, showing year released and album name
Title	Year	Peak chart positions			Album
Title	Year	US	US R&B	US Rap	Album
"Just like Dat???"	2009	—	—	—	Scale-A-Ton
"You On't Want It" (featuring Lord Infamous)	2009	—	—	—	Scale-A-Ton
"I'm Drunk" (featuring Lord Infamous)	2009	—	—	—	Scale-A-Ton
"Skull"	2012	—	—	—	Non-album single
"What I Look Like???"	2012	—	—	—	A Person of Interest
"—" denotes a recording that did not chart or was not released in that territory.

== Guest appearances ==
List of non-single guest appearances, with other performing artists, showing year released and album name
Title	Year	Other performer(s)	Album
"By 2 Da Bad Guy"	2004	Lil Wyte	Phinally Phamous
"Bald Head Hoe's"	2004	Lil Wyte, Juicy J	Phinally Phamous
"Good Googly Moogly"	2006	Project Pat, Juicy J	Crook by da Book: The Fed Story
"Get Rowdy"	2011	Drumma Boy, Young Buck	Clash Of The Titans
"My City Is The Realest"	2012	Drumma Boy	Welcome To My City 2
"Black Bandanna"	2012	Maino	I Am Who I Am
"Leanin'"	2012	PaperChasers	Ahead Of The Rest
"Cobain"	2012	Yukmouth, Ya Boy The Rockstar, D-Golder	Half Baked
"I'ont Know"	2012	Young Buck	Strictly 4 Traps N Trunks 44: Free Young Buck Edition
"Ho Niggaz"	2012	Shawty Redd, Fresco Kane	Rnpl (Rap Now Produce Later)
"Violent Music"	2012	DJ Kay Slay, Busta Rhymes, Vado	Grown Man Hip-Hop
"Violent Music" (Remix)	2013	DJ Kay Slay, Busta Rhymes, Vado, Bun B, Gunplay	Grown Man Hip Hop Part 2 (Sleepin' With The Enemy)
"Make Room" (Remix)	2013	A-Wax, Gucci Mane	Jesus Malverde
"Party Prophet"	2013	Yelawolf	Black Fall
"90's Rich"	2013	Peter Jackson, 3D NaTee, Joell Ortiz	Good Company
"Monster Squad"	2016	Big Hoodoo, Insane Clown Posse, Axe Murder Boyz, Anybody Killa	Asylum
"Fuck Em' All"	2016	Riff Raff, DJ Afterthought, Quavo	Balloween
"NNEVERNOT"	2017	Kennedy Jones	Shellshock Annihilation
"Too Much"	2018	Berner	Rico
"In The Way"	2018	Berner, Krayzie Bone, Bizzy Bone	Rico
"Fite Back"	2019	Insane Clown Posse	Flip the Rat
"Rowdy"	2019	Yelawolf, Machine Gun Kelly	Trunk Muzik III
"Box Chevy 6"	2019	Yelawolf, Rittz, Pimp C	Trunk Muzik III
"Country Rich"	2019	Yelawolf	Ghetto Cowboy
"FLOOR SEATS"	2019	Riff Raff, Chief Keef	CRANBERRY VAMPIRE
"Work of Art"	2020	Jon Connor, Jarren Benton, Locksmith	S.O.S.
"Open"	2021	Yelawolf, Caskey	Blacksheep
"Mossy Oak"	2021	Riff Raff, Yelawolf	Turquoise Tornado
"Privacy"	2021	Yelawolf, DJ Muggs, Del The Funky Homosapien	Mile Zero
"Mafia Family"	2021	Seed of 6ix, Yelawolf	—N/a
"PYS"	2022	Freddie Gibbs	Soul Sold Separately
"Jazzy Vicious"	2023	Rob Vicious	—N/a
