= DJ Paul =

American rapper (born 1977)

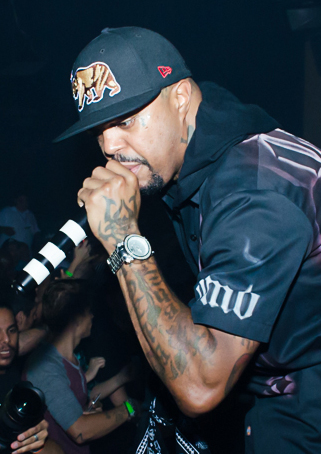
- DJ Paul performing in 2015

Background information
- Also known as: Da Killa Man; DJ Paul K.O.M.
- Born: Paul Duane Beauregard; January 12, 1977 (age 49); Memphis, Tennessee, U.S.
- Genres: Southern hip-hop; Memphis rap; phonk; crunk; trap; horrorcore
- Occupations: Rapper; disc jockey; record producer; entrepreneur; record executive
- Instruments: Vocals; turntables; sampler; drum machine; keyboards
- Years active: 1988–present
- Labels: Hypnotize Minds; Prophet; Slumerican; Scale-A-Ton; Psychopathic
- Member of: Three 6 Mafia
- Website: djpaulkom.tv

Paul Duane Beauregard (born January 12, 1977), known professionally as DJ Paul, is an American rapper and record producer. He is a founding member of hip hop group Three 6 Mafia and the half-brother of rapper Lord Infamous. DJ Paul is also the half-brother of convicted drug lord Craig Petties. He is also a part owner of FaZe Clan.

DJ Paul started his career in the late 1980s as a DJ and released a number of solo tapes, as well as three collaboration albums with Lord Infamous as The Serial Killaz. Juicy J was introduced and the three founded the group Three 6 Mafia, going on to achieve national success in the late 1990s and early 2000s. Their 2000 album, When the Smoke Clears: Sixty 6, Sixty 1, debuted at number six on the Billboard 200 chart and was certified platinum. In 2006, DJ Paul, Juicy J, Crunchy Black, and Frayser Boy won an Academy Award for Best Original Song for "It's Hard out Here for a Pimp" from the film Hustle & Flow. Paul has also released three solo albums, and created soundtracks to two movies. In 2018, he co-produced the track "Talk Up" from Drake's fifth studio album, Scorpion.

Aside from music, DJ Paul has been involved in a variety of business ventures, including film production and real estate. He founded his own record label Scale-A-Ton Entertainment, co-owns the fashion wear line Dangerus / Skandulus, has a collection of BBQ seasonings and is the spokesman for a legal version of the drink Sizzurp.

== Career ==
=== 1988–1992: Career beginnings ===
In 1988, DJ Paul started his career at age 11 as a DJ in Memphis club "380 Beale". At first he wanted to focus on DJing instead of rapping. In 1989, he formed the duo the Serial Killaz, together with his half-brother Lord Infamous. Paul served as the producer, making beats, which Infamous would rap over. The two did not have any equipment, so they would rent local DJ Just Born's studio with the money their father gave them. Paul would play and scratch records on his mother's record player when she was not home. They released self-recorded tapes in their neighborhood, school, and local shops. Their first tape, Portrait of a Serial Killa, was released in 1992. In the following years, the duo went on to release The Serial Killaz tape and two parts of Come with Me 2 Hell.

"Mixtapes, back in the day, was just a mix of people's favorite songs. Like if your uncle or whatever would take his favorite O'Jays songs, his favorite Staples Singers songs, and put them all on one tape, so when they have a party, they could play all of their favorite songs. ... Memphis took it a step further. ...that's what me, DJ Squeeky, and Juicy J would do. We would put our own songs on our mixtapes. That's what people do today, but we were doing that back in '88."

— DJ Paul in an interview with journalist Louis Goggans from Memphis Flyer newspaper in 2013.

DJ Paul eventually bought studio equipment, consisting of a keyboard, a turntable, and a four-track recorder. He started making mixtapes with popular songs and selling them at his high school. Later he started including songs of his affiliated rappers on the tapes as well, in order to promote them. Eventually, he began making mixtapes consisting only of original songs by himself and local artists. Paul claimed that Memphis DJs, such as himself, DJ Spanish Fly, DJ Squeeky and Juicy J created the modern format of mixtapes by including their original songs, instead of making compilations of other artists' music.

DJ Paul also released a number of solo tapes called Volume 1 to Volume 16. He rose to prominence as a DJ and producer on the south side of Memphis, and was introduced to fellow producer Juicy J, who was also garnering buzz on the north side of the city. Together with Lord Infamous, they formed the group the Backyard Posse. DJ Paul and Juicy J soon began producing tracks, described as "dark, eerie ... driven by bass-heavy beats and haunting sounds." They changed their name to Triple Six Mafia, after a phrase Lord Infamous would use to refer to the group in their songs.

=== 1993–2005: Three 6 Mafia and debut solo album ===
In 1994, Triple Six Mafia were joined by Koopsta Knicca and released the underground album Smoked Out Loced Out. Later the group acquired two more members, Gangsta Boo and Crunchy Black and changed its name again to Three 6 Mafia. In 1995, they self-released their debut studio album, Mystic Stylez. Following the album's success, Three 6 Mafia signed a major label deal with Relativity Records. They also started their own label Hypnotize Minds and signed a number of local artists, such as Project Pat, MC Mack, La Chat, Frayser Boy and Lil Wyte, among others. DJ Paul and Juicy J exclusively produced the whole albums by their artists, as well as Three 6 Mafia's releases. The group achieved commercial success with their 2000 album, When the Smoke Clears: Sixty 6, Sixty 1, which debuted at number six on the Billboard 200 chart and was eventually certified platinum by RIAA.

In 2002, DJ Paul released his debut solo studio album Underground Volume 16: For da Summa. Most of the songs, originally featured on his 1994 mixtape Underground Volume 16: 4 Da Summa of '94, were remastered and some of the old featured artists were replaced with new ones from Hypnotize Minds, such as Frayser Boy and La Chat. The album peaked at number 127 at the Billboard 200.

Three 6 Mafia released two more commercially successful albums: Da Unbreakables in 2003 and Most Known Unknown in 2005, both peaking in top five of Billboard 200. They also created the soundtracks of the movies Choices and its sequel Choices II: The Setup. By 2006, Paul and Juicy were the only members of the group left.

=== 2006–2012: Academy Award win, Scale-A-Ton and A Person of Interest ===
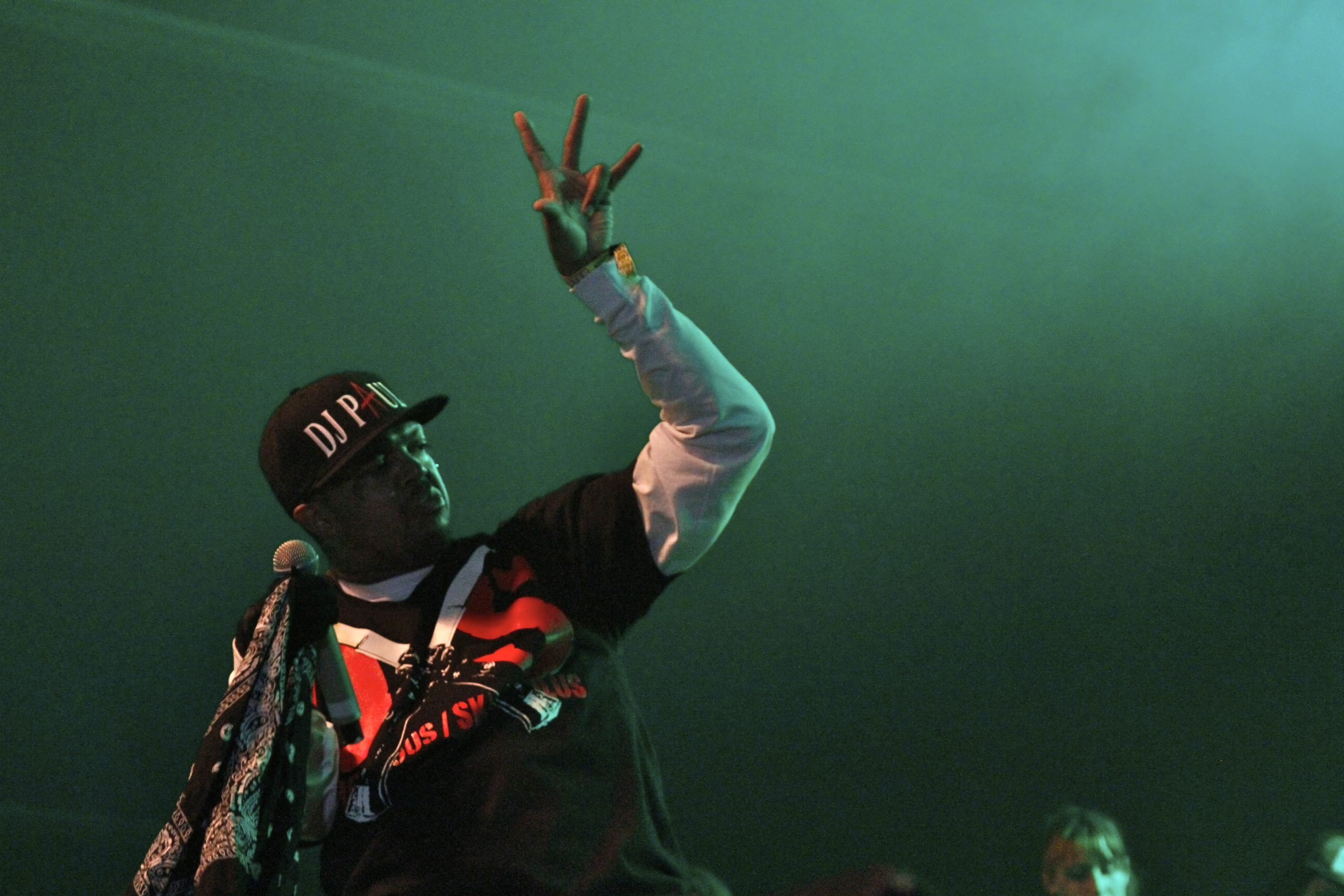
DJ Paul performing in 2007

In 2006, DJ Paul, Juicy J, and Crunchy Black won an Academy Award for Best Original Song for "It's Hard out Here for a Pimp" from the film Hustle & Flow. The song, which they co-wrote with HCP member Frayser Boy, was also ranked at number 80 on VH1's "100 Greatest Songs of Hip Hop".

After Three 6 Mafia released their 2008 album Last 2 Walk, the group had conflicts with their label Sony about their music style, which led DJ Paul and Juicy J to pursue other ventures and their solo careers.

In 2009, Paul released The Weigh In – his first mixtape since the Volume series in the early 1990s. A few months later he followed up with his second solo album Scale-A-Ton, released under Paul's newly founded label Scale-A-Ton Entertainment. The album was received well by critics, earning a positive review and an "Album pick" by AllMusic. In 2010, Paul released his second mixtape Too Kill Again, hosted by DJ Scream and DJ Whoo Kid. The mixtape features many upcoming and new Memphis artists such as Lion Heart, Thug Therapy, Partee and Miscellaneous. DJ Paul stated the tape was a preview to his upcoming album, also titled Too Kill Again, which however was never released. Instead, in 2011, Paul made a new collaboration mixtape with rapper Ya Boy and producer Lil Lody, called Pray For Forgiveness. A few months later Paul released a retail No-DJ version with bonus songs to iTunes.

In 2012, Paul announced he was working on an experimental dub-hop EP called A Person of Interest. Later he changed it into a full featured album, which was released on October 22. A Person of Interest was packed with a bonus DVD, including a self-titled short movie, music videos and behind the scenes footage. Paul released videos for a number of songs from the album, including "What I Look Like (W.I.L.L.)", "Wit Tha Shit", "Trap Back Jumpin", "E&J" and a remix of "I'm Dat Raw" with Snow Tha Product. Paul called A Person of Interest his favorite solo album, stating that he loved the production and the "raw" sound of the album.

=== 2013–present: S.I.M., Da Mafia 6ix, The Killjoy Club, Master of Evil, etc. ===
In early 2013, DJ Paul focused on performing as a DJ, and created a DJ duo, called S.I.M. (Sex is Mandatory). The group created a number of live sets, as well as remixes to songs, such as Just Blaze & Baauer's "Higher".

In late 2013, Paul and Lord Infamous were discussing creating a sequel to their 1993 album Come with Me 2 Hell, when the latter came with the idea to try and reunite the whole Three 6 Mafia crew. Infamous brought back Crunchy Black, Koopsta Knicca and Gangsta Boo, and the five of them reunited as "Da Mafia 6ix" with plans to release an album in 2014. On November 12, 2013, Da Mafia 6ix released their first mixtape 6ix Commandments. The tape was almost entirely produced by DJ Paul and featured Yelawolf, 8Ball & MJG, Krayzie Bone, Bizzy Bone, SpaceGhostPurrp and HCP affiliates Lil Wyte, Skinny Pimp and La Chat, among others. Juicy J and Project Pat also appeared as surprise guests on the posse song "Body Parts", being credited just as "& more" in the track listing.

DJ Paul collaborated on a mixtape titled Clash of da Titans with fellow Memphis producer Drumma Boy that was released on October 23, 2013, and on a free EP, called Black Fall, with rapper Yellawolf, which they put out for Halloween on October 31, 2013. On November 26, 2013, DJ Paul released Volume 16: The Original Masters, a remaster of his 1994 mixtape 4 da Summer of '94. It was revealed on the PSYR17 EP given away at the 2014 Gathering of the Juggalos that DJ Paul plans to release his next solo album, Master of Evil, on Psychopathic Records in 2015. He later confirmed it himself on August 28 on The Australia underground hip hop podcast "The Underground Podcast", as well as on the outro song to The Killjoy Club's debut album Reindeer Games.

DJ Paul has been announced to play South by Southwest showcase in Austin, Texas on March 21, 2015.

On August 19, 2016, DJ Paul announced that he has signed to Yelawolf's Slumerican Records. Upon signing with Slumerican, Paul released a two-album series titled YOTS: Year of the Six parts 1 & 2.

In 2017, he released the follow-up to his album "Underground, Volume 16: For da Summa" respectfully titled, "Underground, Volume 17: For da Summa" through his own Scale-A-Ton imprint. On September 2, 2018, Paul announced that he had begun working on the next volume in the "Underground" series titled "Drackula: Vol. 18", which is said to be recorded in Castle Dracula in Transylvania. The project was originally scheduled to release sometime in 2018, but has since been pushed back to 2019.

== Personal life ==
DJ Paul and Juicy J starred in MTV's 2007 reality show Adventures in Hollyhood, which showed Three 6 Mafia's move to Hollywood, California shortly after they were awarded their Oscar. The show also featured their personal assistants Computer and Big Triece, as well as Hypnotize Minds artists Project Pat and Lil Wyte. The series aired for eight episodes between April 5 and May 23, 2007.

In 2011, DJ Paul starred in VH1's cooking show Famous Food together with seven other celebrities and eventually won first place. In an interview, Paul cleared up some controversy from the show, involving Ashley Dupre best known from the Eliot Spitzer scandal.

In a 2013 interview, Paul said he is getting three hours of sleep a day due to the amount of work he has to do in the variety of business ventures he has a part in. Describing his daily schedule, he said that he works with all of his companies during the day and records music during the night, stating that "I feel like if I'm not working, then I'm losing and I'm not really giving my life what I should be giving."

On December 20, 2013, his half-brother, Lord Infamous, died from a heart attack at their mother's house in Memphis, Tennessee.

DJ Paul is no longer engaged to Majda Baltic. They participated in an episode of Celebrity Wife Swap together with Plaxico Burress and his wife. They stated that they met at the Salt Lake City Airport.

== Business ventures ==
In 2001, DJ Paul and the rest of Three 6 Mafia created the straight-to-video film Choices, followed by a sequel Choices II: The Setup, which was released in 2005. In 2007, DJ Paul and Juicy J started their own fashion wear line titled "Dangerus / Skandulus". It was branded as the official Three 6 Mafia wear and includes T-shirts, hats, accessories and stickers. DJ Paul founded his own record label Scale-A-Ton Entertainment in 2009. He has released his last two albums under the label.

In 2012, DJ Paul launched a collection of BBQ seasonings called "DJ Paul BBQ". Paul initially created a BBQ rub seasoning, soon followed by a Smoked Out BBQ Sauce. In 2013, DJ Paul became the official spokesman for a new legal version of the alcoholic drink Sizzurp. As of 2013, Paul also owns a real estate company.

== Legal issues ==
In an interview with Power 105.1's The Breakfast Club, Paul stated he has been arrested numerous times. He received his first jail sentence at the age of 17.

In 2006, a man from Pittsburgh, Pennsylvania, named Ramone Williams, filed a lawsuit against DJ Paul and other Three 6 Mafia members, claiming he has been severely beaten at a Three 6 Mafia concert when other fans followed the lyrics of the song "Let's Start a Riot" and attacked him. The man claimed he was hit with a chair, kicked and stomped numerous times. Three 6 Mafia asked for dismissal of the suit on a summary judgment motion. In October 2006, both sides settled the suit and Williams received financial compensation.

On June 8, 2012, a lawsuit was filed against DJ Paul and Juicy J for failing to appear at a concert for which they were booked. The suit claimed the two were booked for an April 2011 show in Orlando, Florida but never showed up. They also never returned a $9,000 advance payment they received for the performance. Paul and Juicy were demanded to pay $50,000 for economic loss, out-of-pocket expenses and loss of income and revenue.

In October 2012, a few days before his third album was released, DJ Paul was arrested in New York when a Taser stun gun was found on him during a routine search. He was charged with a misdemeanor and released shortly after. Paul commented on the arrest: "I honestly didn't know it was illegal. I thought it was at the same level as pepper spray." Paul pleaded guilty and was sentenced to 21 hours of community service.

== Discography ==
Solo albums

- Underground Volume 16: For da Summa (2002)
- Scale-A-Ton (2009)
- A Person of Interest (2012)
- Volume 16: The Original Masters (2013)
- Master of Evil (2015)
- YOTS: Year of the Six Pt. 1 (2016)
- YOTS: Year of the Six Pt. 2 (2016)
- Underground Volume 17: For da Summa (2017)
- Power, Pleasure & Painful Things (2019)
- Goat of All Goats (2026)

== Filmography ==
=== Films ===
Year	Title	Role	Notes
2001	Choices: The Movie	D.J.	Guest Appearances Soundtrack
2004	Choices 2	D.J.	Guest Appearances Soundtrack
2005	Hustle & Flow	R.L	Guest Appearance Soundtrack
2006	Jackass Number Two	Himself	Guest appearance Writer; Soundtrack
2007	Jackass 2.5	Himself	Guest appearance Writer; Soundtrack
2022	Jackass Forever	Himself	Cameo; Soundtrack with Yelawolf

=== Television ===
Year	Title	Role	Notes
2005	Wildboyz	Himself	Episode 3.7
2006	MTV Cribs	Himself	1 episode
2006	Punk'd	Himself	Episode 7.3
2006–2007	WWE Monday Night Raw	Himself	2 episodes
2011	The Tonight Show with Jay Leno	Himself	1 episode
2014	Loiter Squad	Himself	1 episode
2014	Celebrity Wife Swap	Himself	Episode 3.13
2016	The Night Time Show	Himself	Episode 1.4
2017	Ridiculousness	Himself	Episode 9.19
2020	Yelawolf: A Slumerican Life	Himself	TV series documentary
