= Client 9: The Rise and Fall of Eliot Spitzer =

- Theatrical release poster
- Directed by: Alex Gibney
- Produced by: Alex Gibney; Jedd Wider; Todd Wider; Maiken Baird
- Starring: Eliot Spitzer
- Cinematography: Maryse Alberti
- Edited by: Plummy Tucker
- Music by: Peter Nashel
- Distributed by: Magnolia Pictures
- Release date: November 5, 2010
- Running time: 118 minutes
- Country: United States
- Language: English
- Box office: $189,416

Client 9: The Rise and Fall of Eliot Spitzer is a 2010 documentary directed by Alex Gibney about former New York Governor Eliot Spitzer and the sex scandal that derailed his political career. It premiered at the 2010 Tribeca Film Festival on April 24, 2010; on iTunes and Magnolia On Demand on October 1, 2010; and in movie theaters in limited release on November 5, 2010.

Gibney made the film with on-camera cooperation from Spitzer. The director also shared ideas and information with writer Peter Elkind, who wrote the book Rough Justice: The Rise and Fall of Eliot Spitzer.

== Contributors ==
- "Angelina" – Escort, co-worker of Ashley Dupré at Emperors Club VIP (portrayed by Wrenn Schmidt)
- Mike Balboni – Deputy secretary for Public Safety to Governor Spitzer
- Wayne Barrett – Senior editor, The Village Voice
- Richard Beattie – Legal counsel to the Independent Directors of AIG
- Zana Brazdek – Formerly of Emperors Club VIP
- Joe Bruno – NY Senate Majority Leader, 1994–2008
- David Brown – Former staff lawyer to General Spitzer
- Lloyd Constantine – Former Spitzer advisor
- Fred Dicker – New York Post state editor
- Darren Dopp – Communications director
- Peter Elkind – Author of Rough Justice: The Rise and Fall of Eliot Spitzer
- Karen Finley – Performance artist
- Robert Graham – Former Gen Re counsel
- Maurice "Hank" Greenberg – Chairman and CEO of AIG
- Noreen Harrington – Former executive, Stern Asset Management
- Scott Horton – Professor, Columbia Law School
- John Houldsworth – Former CEO of Gen Re Subsidiary
- Ken Langone – Chairman and CEO of Invemed Associates
- Elizabet Monrad – Former CFO of Gen Re
- "Natalia" – Former escort
- Jimmy Siegel – Media consultant
- Kristian Stiles – National Finance Director to Spitzer
- Roger Stone – Political consultant
- Cecil Suwal – Former CEO of Emperors Club VIP
- Hulbert Waldroup – Painter
- John Whitehead – Former chairman Goldman Sachs

== Reception ==
On the review aggregator website Rotten Tomatoes, the film holds an approval rating of 90%, based on 69 reviews, with an average rating of 7.3/10. The website's consensus reads: "Client 9: The Rise and Fall of Eliot Spitzer finds director Alex Gibney once again probing the dark corners of politics with thought-provoking insights and hard-hitting evidence." On Metacritic, the film has a weighted average score of 68 out of 100, based on 24 critics, indicating "generally favorable" reviews.

In The Hollywood Reporter, Kirk Honeycutt wrote:

Gibney takes his time setting the scene and attempts no revolutionary techniques. This is a straightforward doc, mixing together new interviews with Spitzer, other talking heads, news footage, a few self-indulgent metaphorical shots — a swimming shark to illustrate the predatory players who invade the mutual funds business — and a staged interview with an actress playing Spitzer’s main prostitute playmate to protect the real woman’s identity.

The film plays around with quick takes on Spitzer’s psychological makeup and stories about playing Monopoly with his real-estate mogul dad. But the film really hits its stride when it zeroes in on Spitzer’s years as New York’s attorney general.
