= Emperors Club =

Emperors Club may refer to:

- The Emperor's Club, 2002 film
- Emperors Club VIP, the prostitution ring made famous in the Eliot Spitzer prostitution scandal
