= Beachwood, New Jersey =

Borough in Ocean County, New Jersey, US

- Borough
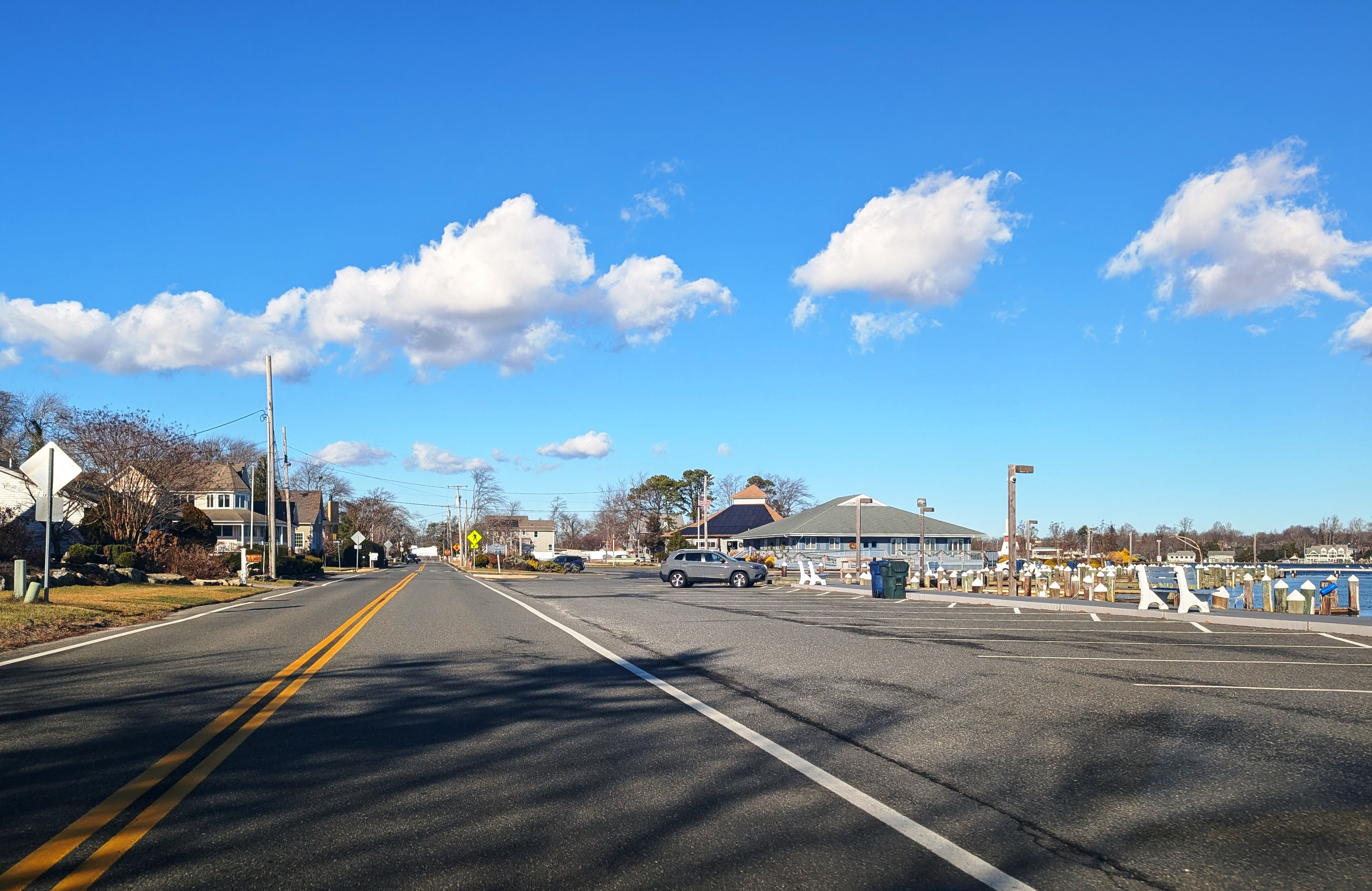
- Beachwood Community Center

- Seal

- Location of Beachwood in Ocean County highlighted in red (right). Inset map: Location of Ocean County in New Jersey highlighted in orange (left).

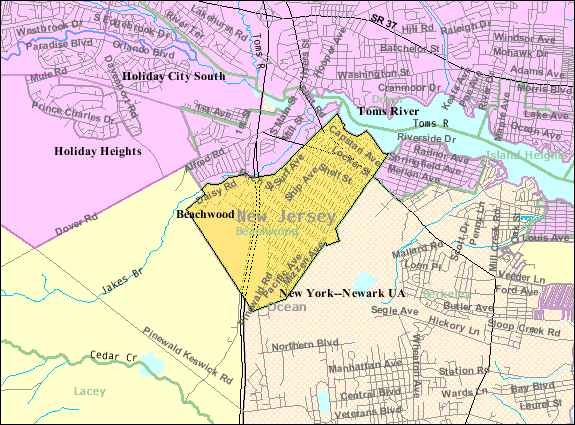
- Census Bureau map of Beachwood, New Jersey

- Location in Ocean County Location in New Jersey Location in the United States
- Coordinates: 39.928405°N 74.202189°W
- Country: United States
- State: New Jersey
- County: Ocean
- Incorporated: April 12, 1917

Government
  - Type: Borough
  - Body: Borough Council
  - Mayor: William J. Cairns (R, term ends December 31, 2027)
  - Administrator / Municipal clerk: Sue Minock

Area
  - Total: 2.76 sq mi (7.16 km^{2})
  - Land: 2.76 sq mi (7.16 km^{2})
  - Water: 0 sq mi (0.00 km^{2}) 0.04%
  - Rank: 358th of 565 in state 17th of 33 in county
- Elevation: 62 ft (19 m)

Population (2020)
  - Total: 10,859
  - Estimate (2023): 11,153
  - Rank: 232nd of 565 in state 12th of 33 in county
  - Density: 3,930.1/sq mi (1,517.4/km^{2})
  - Rank: 164th of 565 in state 5th of 33 in county
- Time zone: UTC−05:00 (Eastern (EST))
  - Summer (DST): UTC−04:00 (Eastern (EDT))
- ZIP Code: 08722
- Area codes: 732/848
- FIPS code: 3402904180
- GNIS feature ID: 0885153
- Website: www.beachwoodusa.com

Beachwood is a borough situated in the Jersey Shore region, within Ocean County, in the U.S. state of New Jersey. As of the 2020 United States census, the borough's population was 10,859, a decrease of 186 (−1.7%) from the 2010 census count of 11,045, which in turn reflected an increase of 670 (+6.5%) from the 10,375 counted in the 2000 census.

Beachwood was incorporated as a borough by an act of the New Jersey Legislature on March 22, 1917, from portions of Berkeley Township, based on the results of a referendum held on April 12, 1917.

== History ==
What is now the borough of Beachwood dates its settlement to a 1914 plan backed by the publishers of the New-York Tribune, under which 1,763 acres (7.13 km^{2}) of Berkeley Township were purchased and sectioned off as a summer colony called "Beachwood". Buyers paid $19.60 for a plot of land measuring 20 by 100 feet (6.1 m × 30.5 m) and received a six-month subscription to The Tribune as a bonus. The first residents of the community moved in during April 1915, and work on a Club House, the Pier, the Bath House, the Lodge, a dining hall and a railroad station were planned to be completed by the end of May. Other offerings within the development included tennis courts, and facilities along the beach and on the river for canoeing, sailing and swimming. The first "cottages" in the community were constructed during that first summer season.

A Property-Owner's Association was established in 1916. In addition to overseeing local services within the development, the organization also advocated that the community should become an independent municipality. Legislation was passed by the Legislature on March 22, 1917, and a referendum approving the establishment of the borough passed on April 12. On May 11, the borough's first council was elected, along with Joseph H. Senior, who was chosen by the voters as Beachwood's first mayor. A board of education was formed the following year, with school transportation provided on the back of a truck outfitted with wooden benches.

In December 2008, the Beachwood Historical Alliance was established, with the goal of the creation of an official town-run Preservation Commission for the purpose of recognizing, restoring and preserving aspects of Beachwood's formation, history, and heritage.

== Geography ==
According to the United States Census Bureau, the borough had a total area of 2.76 square miles (7.16 km^{2}), including 2.76 square miles (7.16 km^{2}) of land and <0.01 square miles (<0.01 km^{2}) of water (0.04%).

The borough borders the Ocean County municipalities of Berkeley Township, Pine Beach and South Toms River.

The borough is one of 11 municipalities in Ocean County that are part of the Toms River watershed.

== Demographics ==
Historical population
Census	Pop.	Note	%±
1920	20		—
1930	394		1,870.0%
1940	650		65.0%
1950	1,251		92.5%
1960	2,765		121.0%
1970	4,390		58.8%
1980	7,687		75.1%
1990	9,324		21.3%
2000	10,375		11.3%
2010	11,045		6.5%
2020	10,859		−1.7%
2023 (est.)	11,153	▲	2.7%
Population sources:1920–2000 1920 1920–1930 1940–2000; 2000 2010 2020

=== 2020 census ===
As of the 2020 census, Beachwood had a population of 10,859. The median age was 38.2 years. 23.4% of residents were under the age of 18 and 13.3% of residents were 65 years of age or older. For every 100 females there were 97.5 males, and for every 100 females age 18 and over there were 95.6 males age 18 and over.

99.9% of residents lived in urban areas, while 0.1% lived in rural areas.

There were 3,719 households in Beachwood, of which 37.5% had children under the age of 18 living in them. Of all households, 56.1% were married-couple households, 14.2% were households with a male householder and no spouse or partner present, and 22.1% were households with a female householder and no spouse or partner present. About 16.3% of all households were made up of individuals and 7.1% had someone living alone who was 65 years of age or older.

There were 3,860 housing units, of which 3.7% were vacant. The homeowner vacancy rate was 0.6% and the rental vacancy rate was 3.5%.

Racial composition as of the 2020 census
Race	Number	Percent
White	9,100	83.8%
Black or African American	272	2.5%
American Indian and Alaska Native	28	0.3%
Asian	150	1.4%
Native Hawaiian and Other Pacific Islander	2	0.0%
Some other race	462	4.3%
Two or more races	845	7.8%
Hispanic or Latino (of any race)	1,290	11.9%

=== 2010 census ===
The 2010 United States census counted 11,045 people, 3,682 households, and 2,953 families in the borough. The population density was 3,878.4 inhabitants per square mile (1,497.5/km^{2}). There were 3,826 housing units at an average density of 1,343.5 per square mile (518.7/km^{2}). The racial makeup was 92.81% (10,251) White, 1.79% (198) Black or African American, 0.07% (8) Native American, 1.50% (166) Asian, 0.01% (1) Pacific Islander, 2.44% (269) from other races, and 1.38% (152) from two or more races. Hispanic or Latino of any race were 8.13% (898) of the population.

Of the 3,682 households, 36.6% had children under the age of 18; 60.7% were married couples living together; 13.3% had a female householder with no husband present and 19.8% were non-families. Of all households, 15.6% were made up of individuals and 5.2% had someone living alone who was 65 years of age or older. The average household size was 3.00 and the average family size was 3.31.

25.5% of the population were under the age of 18, 9.2% from 18 to 24, 27.3% from 25 to 44, 29.0% from 45 to 64, and 9.0% who were 65 years of age or older. The median age was 37.0 years. For every 100 females, the population had 98.4 males. For every 100 females ages 18 and older there were 94.9 males.

The Census Bureau's 2006–2010 American Community Survey showed that (in 2010 inflation-adjusted dollars) median household income was $78,611 (with a margin of error of +/− $5,668) and the median family income was $83,083 (+/− $4,210). Males had a median income of $58,981 (+/− $3,686) versus $46,632 (+/− $5,031) for females. The per capita income for the borough was $28,366 (+/− $1,915). About 5.2% of families and 6.7% of the population were below the poverty line, including 11.9% of those under age 18 and 3.9% of those age 65 or over.

=== 2000 census ===
As of the 2000 United States census there were 10,375 people, 3,475 households, and 2,818 families residing in the borough. The population density was 3,757.3 inhabitants per square mile (1,450.7/km^{2}). There were 3,623 housing units at an average density of 1,312.1 per square mile (506.6/km^{2}). The racial makeup of the borough was 95.66% White, 0.97% African American, 0.13% Native American, 1.13% Asian, 0.06% Pacific Islander, 1.11% from other races, and 0.94% from two or more races. Hispanic or Latino of any race were 4.22% of the population.

There were 3,475 households, out of which 42.0% had children under the age of 18 living with them, 65.0% were married couples living together, 11.4% had a female householder with no husband present, and 18.9% were non-families. 15.0% of all households were made up of individuals, and 5.7% had someone living alone who was 65 years of age or older. The average household size was 2.98 and the average family size was 3.31.

In the borough the population was spread out, with 28.5% under the age of 18, 7.4% from 18 to 24, 32.8% from 25 to 44, 22.6% from 45 to 64, and 8.6% who were 65 years of age or older. The median age was 35 years. For every 100 females, there were 97.1 males. For every 100 females age 18 and over, there were 96.1 males.

The median income for a household in the borough was $59,022, and the median income for a family was $64,190. Males had a median income of $41,204 versus $30,189 for females. The per capita income for the borough was $21,247. About 2.9% of families and 4.5% of the population were below the poverty line, including 6.6% of those under age 18 and 2.7% of those age 65 or over.

== Government ==
=== Local government ===
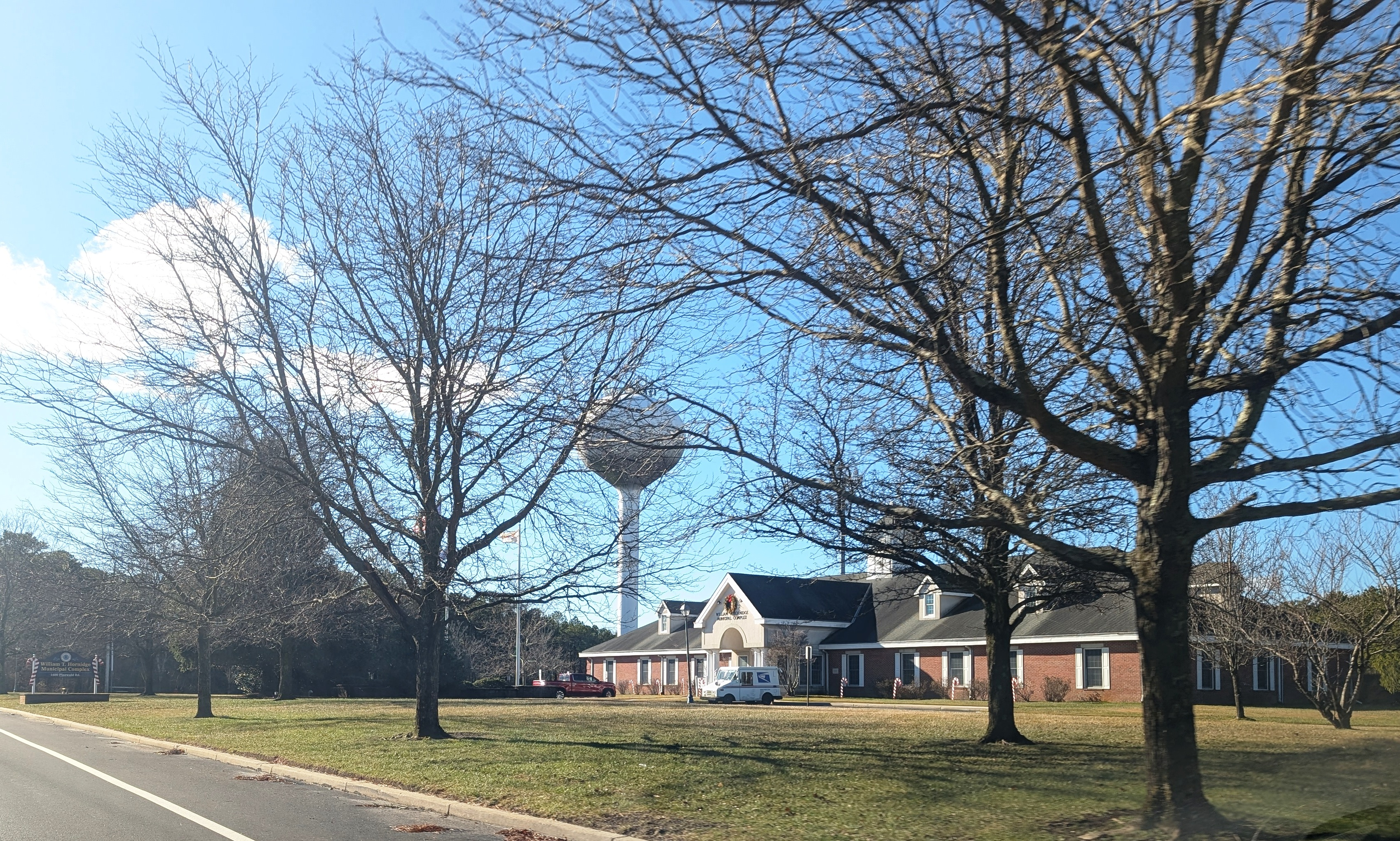
Beachwood municipal complex

Beachwood was originally governed under the Walsh Act commission form of government, which was maintained until the mid-1970s. Beachwood is now governed under the borough form of New Jersey municipal government, which is used in 218 municipalities (of the 564) statewide, making it the most common form of government in New Jersey. The governing body is comprised of the mayor and the borough council, with all positions elected at-large on a partisan basis as part of the November general election. The mayor is elected directly by the voters to a four-year term of office. The borough council includes six members elected to serve three-year terms on a staggered basis, with two seats coming up for election each year in a three-year cycle. The borough form of government used by Beachwood is a "weak mayor / strong council" government in which council members act as the legislative body with the mayor presiding at meetings and voting only in the event of a tie. The mayor can veto ordinances subject to an override by a two-thirds majority vote of the council. The mayor makes committee and liaison assignments for council members, and most appointments are made by the mayor with the advice and consent of the council.

As of 2024, the mayor of Beachwood is Republican Ronald F. Roma Jr., whose term of office ends December 31, 2027. Members of the Beachwood Borough Council are John P. Farro Jr. (R, 2024; appointed to serve an unexpired term), Steven Komsa (R, 2026), Gerald "Jerry" LaCrosse (R, 2025), Thomas Prince (R, 2026), Dan Santos (R, 2024; appointed to an unexpired term) and Edward Zakar (R, 2025).

In January 2024, John Farro was appointed to fill the council seat expiring in December 2024 that became vacant when William Cairns took office as mayor.

Bill Cairns was appointed to fill the vacant seat expiring in December 2015 of Thomas Miserendino, who died in office in June 2015.

=== Federal, state, and county representation ===
Beachwood is located in the 4th Congressional District and is part of New Jersey's 9th state legislative district.

For the 119th United States Congress, New Jersey's 4th congressional district is represented by Chris Smith (R, Manchester Township). New Jersey is represented in the United States Senate by Democrats Cory Booker (Newark, term ends 2027) and Andy Kim (Moorestown, term ends 2031).

For the 2026–2027 session, the 9th legislative district of the New Jersey Legislature is represented in the State Senate by Carmen Amato (R, Berkeley Township) and in the General Assembly by Greg Myhre (R, Stafford Township) and Brian E. Rumpf (R, Little Egg Harbor Township).

Ocean County is governed by a Board of County Commissioners composed of five members who are elected on an at-large basis in partisan elections and serving staggered three-year terms of office, with either one or two seats coming up for election each year as part of the November general election. At an annual reorganization held in the beginning of January, the board chooses a director and a deputy director from among its members. As of 2025, Ocean County's Commissioners (with party affiliation, term-end year and residence) are:

John P. Kelly (R, 2025, Eagleswood Township), Virginia E. Haines (R, 2025, Toms River), Robert Arace (R, Manchester Township, 2027) Jennifer Bacchione (R, Berkeley Township, 2027) and Frank Sadeghi (R, 2026, Toms River).

Constitutional officers elected on a countywide basis are: Clerk Scott M. Colabella (R, 2025, Barnegat Light), Sheriff Michael G. Mastronardy (R, 2025; Toms River) and Surrogate Jeffrey Moran (R, 2028, Beachwood).

=== Politics ===
As of March 2011, there were a total of 6,714 registered voters in Beachwood, of which 1,329 (19.8%) were registered as Democrats, 1,661 (24.7%) were registered as Republicans and 3,718 (55.4%) were registered as Unaffiliated. There were 6 voters registered as Libertarians or Greens. Among the borough's 2010 Census population, 60.8% (vs. 63.2% in Ocean County) were registered to vote, including 81.5% of those ages 18 and over (vs. 82.6% countywide).

Gubernatorial election results for Beachwood
Year	Republican		Democratic		Third party(ies)	
Year	No.	%	No.	%	No.	%
2025	2,583	58.91%	1,782	40.64%	20	0.46%
2021	2,483	68.25%	1,107	30.43%	48	1.32%
2017	1,591	58.97%	1,033	38.29%	74	2.74%
2013	2,064	71.44%	782	27.07%	43	1.49%
2009	2,169	64.98%	937	28.07%	232	6.95%
2005	1,448	50.58%	1,257	43.90%	158	5.52%

In the 2012 presidential election, Republican Mitt Romney received 51.9% of the vote (2,264 cast), ahead of Democrat Barack Obama with 47.0% (2,048 votes), and other candidates with 1.1% (48 votes), among the 4,397 ballots cast by the borough's 6,979 registered voters (37 ballots were spoiled), for a turnout of 63.0%. In the 2008 presidential election, Republican John McCain received 51.5% of the vote (2,610 cast), ahead of Democrat Barack Obama with 46.2% (2,342 votes) and other candidates with 1.3% (68 votes), among the 5,064 ballots cast by the borough's 7,008 registered voters, for a turnout of 72.3%. In the 2004 presidential election, Republican George W. Bush received 58.9% of the vote (2,755 ballots cast), outpolling Democrat John Kerry with 40.0% (1,869 votes) and other candidates with 0.6% (38 votes), among the 4,676 ballots cast by the borough's 6,492 registered voters, for a turnout percentage of 72.0.

Presidential Elections Results
Year	Republican	Democratic	Third Parties
2024	62.8% 3,682	35.2% 2,064	2.0% 5
2020	60.0% 3,587	37.4% 2,234	2.6% 5
2016	63.7% 3,088	31.5% 1,525	4.8% 231
2012	51.9% 2,264	47.0% 2,048	1.1% 48
2008	51.5% 2,610	46.2% 2,342	1.3% 68
2004	58.9% 2,755	40.0% 1,869	0.6% 38

In the 2013 gubernatorial election, Republican Chris Christie received 71.4% of the vote (2,064 cast), ahead of Democrat Barbara Buono with 27.1% (782 votes), and other candidates with 1.5% (43 votes), among the 2,960 ballots cast by the borough's 6,897 registered voters (71 ballots were spoiled), for a turnout of 42.9%. In the 2009 gubernatorial election, Republican Chris Christie received 64.3% of the vote (2,169 ballots cast), ahead of Democrat Jon Corzine with 27.8% (937 votes), Independent Chris Daggett with 5.2% (175 votes) and other candidates with 1.7% (57 votes), among the 3,375 ballots cast by the borough's 6,933 registered voters, yielding a 48.7% turnout.

United States Senate election results for Beachwood1
Year	Republican		Democratic		Third party(ies)	
Year	No.	%	No.	%	No.	%
2024	3,329	59.97%	2,146	38.66%	76	1.37%
2018	2,283	60.62%	1,319	35.02%	164	4.35%
2012	2,209	53.18%	1,873	45.09%	72	1.73%
2006	1,472	55.17%	1,083	40.59%	113	4.24%

United States Senate election results for Beachwood2
Year	Republican		Democratic		Third party(ies)	
Year	No.	%	No.	%	No.	%
2020	3,381	58.57%	2,239	38.78%	153	2.65%
2014	1,240	54.39%	968	42.46%	72	3.16%
2013	989	61.31%	608	37.69%	16	0.99%
2008	2,439	51.94%	2,160	46.00%	97	2.07%

== Education ==
Public school students in kindergarten through twelfth grade attend the Toms River Regional Schools, a regional public school system based primarily in Toms River Township that is the state's largest suburban district. In addition to students from Toms River, the district also serves the boroughs of Beachwood, Pine Beach and South Toms River. As of the 2023–24 school year, the district, comprised of 18 schools, had an enrollment of 14,654 students and 1,078.7 classroom teachers (on an FTE basis), for a student–teacher ratio of 13.6:1. Students in kindergarten through 5th grades attend either Beachwood Elementary School in Beachwood or Pine Beach Elementary in the neighboring community of Pine Beach. Intermediate school students attend Toms River Intermediate School South in Beachwood for grades 6–8. High school students attend Toms River High School South in Toms River Township for grades 9–12. The district's board of education has nine members; seats are allocated based on population, with one seat allocated to Beachwood.

== Transportation ==
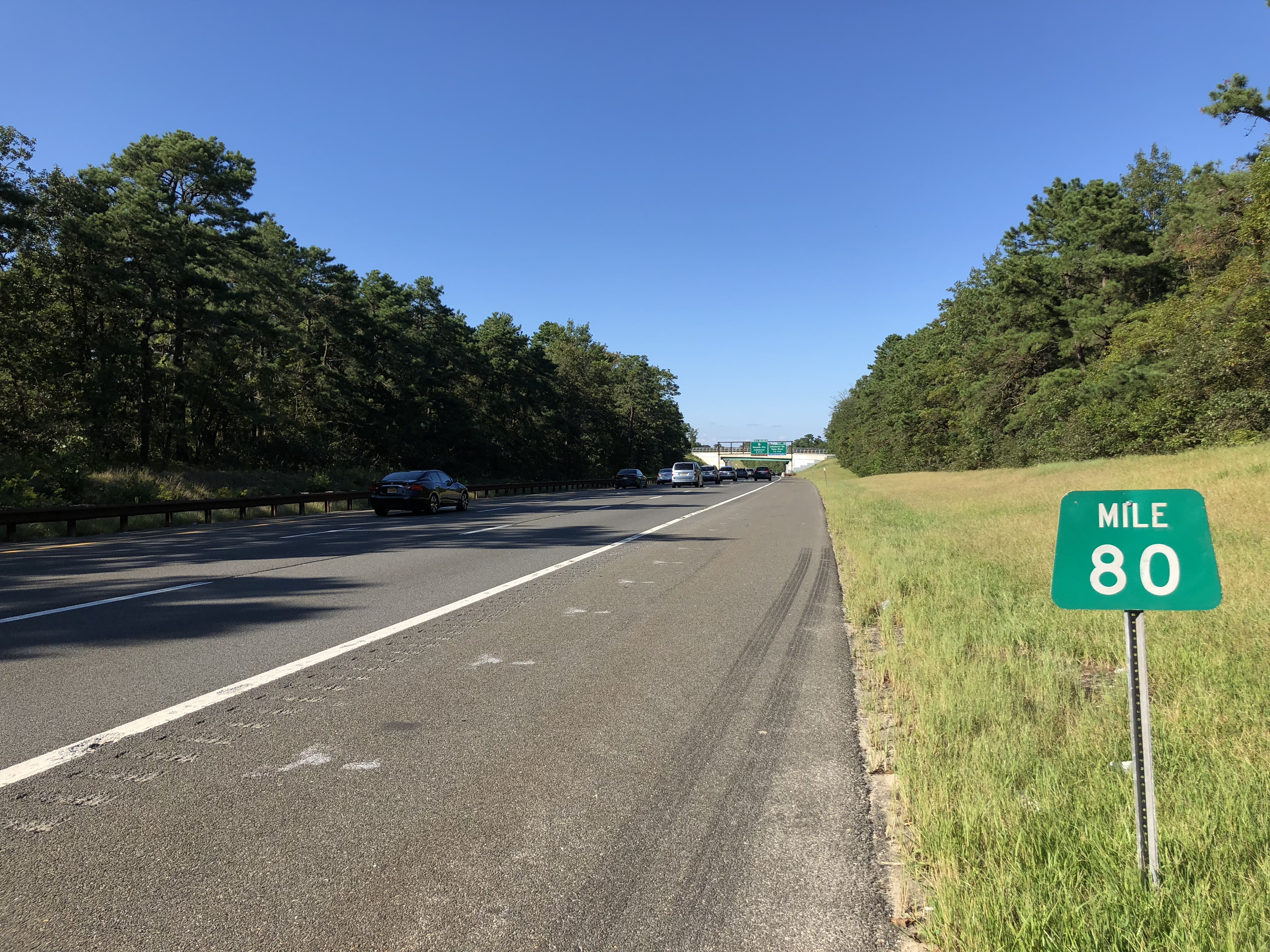
The northbound Garden State Parkway in Beachwood

=== Roads and highways ===
As of May 2010, the borough had a total of 57.09 miles (91.88 km) of roadways, of which 44.82 miles (72.13 km) were maintained by the municipality, 9.30 miles (14.97 km) by Ocean County and 1.49 miles (2.40 km) by the New Jersey Department of Transportation and 1.48 miles (2.38 km) by the New Jersey Turnpike Authority.

The Garden State Parkway passes through the borough, connecting Berkeley Township in the south to South Toms River in the north.

=== Public transportation ===
NJ Transit offers local bus service to and from Lakewood Township/Toms River and Atlantic City on the 559 route.

== Notable people ==
People who were born in, residents of, or otherwise closely associated with Beachwood include:

- Tom Brown Jr. (1950–2024), naturalist, tracker, survivalist and author, who ran the Tom Brown Jr. Tracker School
- Melbourne Armstrong Carriker (1879–1965), ornithologist
- Ashley Alexandra Dupré (born 1985), former Emperors Club VIP Diamond Girl, who was a central figure in the prostitution scandal with Eliot Spitzer, then New York Governor
- Mark Geiger (born 1974), soccer referee who officiated at the 2014 FIFA World Cup and the 2018 FIFA World Cup
- Jeffrey Moran (born 1946), Ocean County Surrogate and former member of the New Jersey General Assembly from 1986 to 2003, who served on the Beachwood Borough Council from 1970 to 1972
