= Alix Earle =

American social media personality (born 2000)

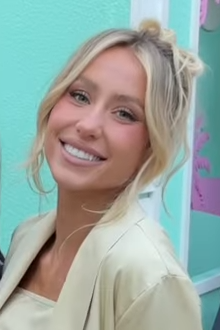
- Earle in April 2023
- Born: Alix Ashley Earle; December 16, 2000 (age 25); Monmouth County, New Jersey, U.S.
- Education: University of Miami (BBA)
- Years active: 2020–present

TikTok information
- Page: alixearle
- Followers: 8.5 million

YouTube information
- Channel: Alix Earle
- Subscribers: 348K
- Alix Earle's voice April 2023 recording of Earle discussing her rise on TikTok

Alix Ashley Earle (born December 16, 2000) is an American social media personality and entrepreneur who is most known for her "Get Ready With Me" videos on TikTok, combining makeup routines with details of her . She is known by online communities for promoting products in a way that rapidly increases sales, which has been dubbed by users as the "Alix Earle effect". Commentators have attributed her popularity to her openness about topics such as acne and mental health.

== Early life and education ==
Earle was born December 16, 2000, in Monmouth County, New Jersey, to Thomas "TJ" Earle, a construction business owner in Wall Township, New Jersey, and Alisa Maniaci, who is of Italian descent. Her parents met at Lynn University in Boca Raton, Florida. In July 2008, the New York Post reported that Earle's father was having an affair with Ashley Alexandra Dupré, an escort known for her involvement in the Eliot Spitzer prostitution scandal that resulted in Spitzer resigning as Governor of New York. Earle's parents divorced in 2013 and her father married Dupré in October of that year. Earle has a younger sister, Ashtin Earle, and three half-siblings from her father's second marriage.

Earle graduated from Red Bank Catholic High School in 2019 and attended the University of Miami, where she graduated with a degree in marketing in 2023.

Throughout Earle’s teenage years she experienced severe cystic acne and body dysmorphia. In December 2022, she spoke online about experiencing anxiety since high school and disclosed her use of SSRI Lexapro medication to manage it. In October 2023, Earle publicly stated that she had also developed an eating disorder during that time, describing how she restricted her food intake during the day and forego meals before events, which later developed into bulimia.

== Career ==
=== Social media ===
Earle is active on TikTok, Instagram and YouTube. As of March 2026, she had more than 14 million followers across TikTok and Instagram combined. Her content style varies by platform.

Her platform with the largest following, TikTok, is leveraged by Earle who mainly posts and provides short form videos, which are no longer than three minutes long. In February 2020, as a University of Miami freshman, Earle began posting on TikTok. Her first video depicted her and her friends showing off their outfits, which were made of trash bags.

Earle’s growth on TikTok accelerated in the summer of 2022, when she was affected by intense visible acne flare ups on her face and neck. She received an increase in followers around this time, which she attributed to posting about her struggles with acne in an interview with Howard Stern on May 3, 2023. Acne became her key discussion point, which expanded into other topics ranging from anxiety and former relationships to her messy house.

This further transitioned into the style of "Get Ready With Me" (GRWM) videos. This genre began on YouTube in the 2000s and 2010s mostly as tutorials. Earle and other creators have now shifted towards storytelling while getting ready, where personality matters more than technical skill. As an extension of the genre, Earle also posts "get unready with me" (UNGRWM) videos, in which she goes through her skincare routine in the evening, often after a night out.

Earle utilises Instagram to post fashion and magazine work using announcements and photo collections known as "photo dumps". For example, in May 2024, she announced in a joint Instagram post with SI Swimsuit that she was the magazine’s first digital cover star, for its June issue. She returned as an SI Swimsuit model in 2025 and was named a 2026 cover model. Additionally she included her Vogue Türkiye cover, she shared with her sister Ashtin in 2025.

To extend the topics covered in her short form content, Earle uses YouTube to share vlogs that give a behind the scenes look at her life and later relaunched her podcast there. Her first vlog released on her personal YouTube channel on 26 March 2025, covering a family spring break trip.

Her influence across these platforms has been formally recognised. Upon graduation, Earle created the Alix Earle Scholarship for students at Miami Herbert Business School. In July 2025, Earle was named in the inaugural TIME100 Creators list, which recognised 100 influential online creators from around the world.

=== Business and media ventures ===
==== Podcast ====
In September 2023, Earle announced a podcast, Hot Mess with Alix Earle, produced by The Unwell Network, which is led by Alex Cooper. The network was positioned as a production company that could speak to Gen Z audiences with "unique voices that embrace social challenges and personal insecurities through honest conversation". In February 2025, the Unwell Network dropped the podcast and SiriusXM stopped selling ads for it. Hot Mess returned in June 2025 as a "vlog cast", a video format hosted on her YouTube channel and Spotify. The podcast covers her travels, life after college, friends, family and relationships. Episodes run about 45 minutes and offer a glimpse of things followers may not see in her TikTok vlogs.

==== Brands and investments ====
Earle has moved from paid brand partnerships to equity-based deals and, in 2026, founded her own company. She has invested in several consumer brands, mostly in beverages including SipMargs, Gorgie and Poppi.

In March 2026, Earle launched Reale Actives, an acne focused skincare brand being her first company as a founder and chief creative officer. She attributed the line to her own acne journey, including documenting her struggles online and completing three rounds of Accutane treatment. Andrea Blieden is the brand's CEO, who formerly worked for Kiehl’s and The Body Shop. Earle developed the brand's products with the dermatologist Kiran Mian, whom she had gradually introduced to her audience, beginning with a vlog back in 2024.

Earle spent about a year hinting at the brand to her audience before the reveal. Blieden said the team wanted audiences to follow the journey rather than be surprised on launch day. The campaign launched easter eggs. For example Earle frequently featured unlabelled skincare bottles before any announcements were made. A teaser Instagram account named wtfisalixdoing, helped reveal the launch. and an outdoor billboard was assembled from puzzle pieces sent to Earle’s fellow creators.

At launch, the products were sold only through the brand’s website, with no immediate plans to stock retailers such as Sephora or Ulta. Earle said she would focus on working with smaller creators, particularly those who document their own acne journeys, rather than relying only on her following. The brand’s messaging described the skincare line as "Built for breakouts. Made for everyone"

Reale Actives went on sale on March 31, 2026. The brand reportedly hit $5million in sales on its first day and sold out by 4 p.m. and took less than five minutes for the brand to hit $1 million in sales

The brand launched with four products, sold direct to consumers.

- A cleansing balm ($29)
- An exfoliating gel cleanser containing LHA and BHA ($28)
- An 8% mandelic acid serum concentrate "Go Deep ($39)
- A barrier-supporting moisturizer ($36)

In 2026 the brand added a serum for redness, "Go calm" ($39)

==== Television and music ====
Earle was named in the Forbes 30 Under 30 list in 2023. In June 2024, Earle appeared in the music video for the single "Girls" by the Australian artist The Kid Laroi.

In May 2025, Earle was announced as a contestant on season 34 of Dancing with the Stars. Partnered with Valentin Chmerkovskiy, she reached the finale and ultimately placed second behind Robert Irwin.In March 2026, Earle announced her new skincare brand, Reale Actives.

In September, 2026, Earle starred in the new Netflix series Earle Meets World, a reality show starring her family.

=== Philanthropy ===
In 2023, Earle established the Alix Earle Scholarship at the University of Miami's Herbert Business School. The scholarship provides financial assistance to business students and includes mentorship from Earle.

In 2024, Earle founded Serving on Heels, a volunteer initiative originally known as Meals in Heels, which began preparing and distributing meals in Miami. In November 2025, she hosted an event in Los Angeles where volunteers prepared approximately 3,000 Thanksgiving meals for local community members.

== Personal life ==
Earle dated Tyler Wade, a professional baseball player for the San Diego Padres, for three months in late 2022. In November 2023, Earle confirmed her relationship with Braxton Berrios, a wide receiver for the New York Giants. Earle and Berrios split in December 2025.

== Filmography ==
=== Film ===
Year	Title	Role	Note
2025	Happy Gilmore 2	Herself	

=== Television ===
Year	Title	Role	Note
2025	Dancing with the Stars	Herself / Contestant	Season 34; 2nd place
2026	Super Bowl LX Halftime Show	Herself	Television specials
2026	Earle Meets World	Herself	

=== Music video ===
Year	Title	Role	Artist(s)
2024	"Girls"	Female Lead	The Kid Laroi
2026	"The Time of My Life"	Female Lead	Benson Boone
