= Famous Food =

- Genre: Reality television
- Starring: Heidi Montag; Danielle Staub; DJ Paul; Juicy J; Ashley Dupre; Jake Pavelka; Vincent Pastore
- Country of origin: United States
- Original language: English
- No. of seasons: 1
- No. of episodes: 10

Production
- Executive producer: Mark Cronin/Cris Abrego
- Production locations: Hollywood, Los Angeles, California

Original release
- Network: VH1
- Release: July 10 – September 7, 2011

Famous Food is a VH1 reality series that premiered 10 July 2011. It features seven celebrities as they work to open and take ownership in a restaurant in Hollywood owned by Mike Malin (who competed in Big Brother 2 and Big Brother 7: All-Stars, which he won) and Lonnie Moore of The Dolce Group. Due to low ratings, VH1 announced on July 15 that the show will move to Wednesdays 8/7c beginning July 20. DJ Paul was the winner of the partnership but after a twist the judges awarded a second partnership to Danielle Staub. The restaurant created on the show, named "Lemon Basket", was closed after just 5 months.

== Format ==
The contestants will work to launch Famous Food, a Hollywood restaurant, with their skills being tested in challenges. At the season's end, the winner will be given a partnership stake in the business.

== Contestants ==
Contestant	Age	Known for
Ashley Dupre	25	New York Post sex columnist/former call girl in the Eliot Spitzer prostitution scandal
DJ Paul	34/35	Three 6 Mafia rap group member
Juicy J	36	Three 6 Mafia rap group member
Heidi Montag	24	Cast member of The Hills
Jake Pavelka	33	Contestant on The Bachelorette and The Bachelor during the 14th season
Vincent Pastore	64	Cast member of The Sopranos
Danielle Staub	48	Former cast member of The Real Housewives of New Jersey

== Production ==
In 2011, various cast members were seen filming for an upcoming reality series. On April 21, 2011, the series was confirmed by VH1. On the same day, cast member Heidi Montag talked about the series on On Air with Ryan Seacrest, saying it "is about several celebrities coming together and building a restaurant, and working in it, and kind of figuring out the in’s and outs of the restaurant business, and how to be successful in it."

== Episodes ==
Episode	U.S. Air Date	Rating/Share (18-49)	Viewers (Millions)
"Fame"	July 10, 2011	0.2	0.43
"Pressure Cooker"	July 17, 2011	0.2	0.43
"A Special Kind of Evil"	July 20, 2011	0.2	0.33
"Spoonfuls of Crap"	July 27, 2011	0.2	0.35
"Call Me the Problem Solver"	August 3, 2011	0.2	0.40
"You Poke the Bear You're Going to Get the Claws"	August 10, 2011	0.2	0.50
"In the Hot Seat"	August 17, 2011	0.2	0.36
"We're From the Street We Don't Play Like That"	August 24, 2011	0.2	0.36
"Putting Out Fires"	August 31, 2011	0.2	0.37
"Then We'll See Who's the MVP"	September 7, 2011	0.3	0.44

== Ratings ==
The show's first two episodes, which aired on July 10 & 17 averaged 0.43 million viewers and a 0.2 rating in adults 18–49, making it the lowest rated VH1 show of the season. Resulting in not returning for a second season.
