= A Person of Interest (album) =

Studio album by DJ Paul
- Released: October 22, 2012
- Recorded: 2012
- Studios: Scale-A-Ton Studios (Hollywood, California); We Whit It Studios (Las Vegas, Nevada); Acoustic Productions Studio (Las Vegas, Nevada)
- Genres: Crunk; trap; gangsta rap
- Length: 79:56
- Labels: Scale-A-Ton, Hypnotize Minds
- Producers: DJ Paul (also exec.), Shawty Trap; Dream Drumz; Gtown Vega; J Green; Premo Danger

DJ Paul chronology
Scale-A-Ton (2009)	A Person of Interest (2012)	Master of Evil (2015)

Professional ratings
Review scores
Source	Rating
RapReviews	6.0/10 stars

A Person of Interest is the third studio album by American rapper and record producer DJ Paul, released on October 22, 2012. Paul states that the album, which is a mix of gangsta rap and crunk, is aimed at the core Three 6 Mafia fans. Unlike his previous albums, A Person of Interest also incorporates influences from dubstep and electronic dance music. Featured artists are long-time collaborators Lil Wyte, Project Pat and Gucci Mane as well as upcoming artist Locodunit. The album peaked at number 34 on the US Billboard Top R&B/Hip-Hop Albums and No. 11 on the Billboard Heatseekers Albums.

== Background ==
In April 2012, Paul released a mixtape called 'For I Have Sinned' hosted by DJ Scream and DJ Black. The mixtape has been downloaded over 14,000 times at DatPiff. In October DJ Paul released a free album sampler for A Person of Interest which includes 8 of the album's 26 tracks.

DJ Paul performed the single 'What I Look Like (W.I.L.L.)' live at the 2012 Gathering of the Juggalos. Between September and October Paul released several music videos for songs from the album on his YouTube channel - 'What I Look Like (W.I.L.L.)', 'Wit Tha Shit' and 'Trap Back Jumpin'. 'W.I.L.L.' was originally released without Gucci Mane's verse, but only the remix was included on the album.

Few days before the album release, DJ Paul was arrested in New York when a taser was found on him during a routine search. He was charged with misdemeanor and released shortly after.

== Movie ==
A Person of Interest was released as a CD-DVD set. The bonus DVD includes a self-titled short movie, behind the scenes footage and music videos. The comedy-horror movie follows the story of DJ Paul, who has been stalked on Twitter and in real life by a mysterious woman. In an interview with Power 105′s The Breakfast Club, Paul stated the movie was initially planned as a set of music videos and skits to promote the album, but later the idea evolved into a complete movie.

== Track listing ==
Track listing confirmed on iTunes. Producers list from the album booklet.

No.	Title	Producer(s)	Length
1.	"Under My Control (Intro)"	DJ Paul	0:37
2.	"I'm Dat Raw"	DJ Paul; Shawty Trap	3:23
3.	"I Can't Take It" (featuring DJ Kay Slay)	DJ Paul; Shawty Trap	3:31
4.	"Trap Back Jumpin'"	DJ Paul; Dream Drumz	3:21
5.	"If I Want 2"	DJ Paul; Shawty Trap	1:59
6.	"Get 'em Done"	DJ Paul; Shawty Trap	3:05
7.	"Amnesia"	DJ Paul; Shawty Trap	3:04
8.	"Had ta Eat" (featuring Aaron Williams)	DJ Paul; Aaron Williams	2:58
9.	"All in da Family"	DJ Paul; Young Preach	3:17
10.	"Chin Up"	DJ Paul; Dream Drumz	3:19
11.	"Zeros & Commas"	DJ Paul; Gtown Vega	2:58
12.	"Burn"	DJ Paul; Dream Drumz	2:44
13.	"W.I.L.L." (featuring Gucci Mane)	DJ Paul; Dream Drumz	3:39
14.	"Which One"	DJ Paul; Gtown Vega	3:18
15.	"E&J" (featuring Locodunit)	DJ Paul; Shawty Trap	3:59
16.	"Shut 'em Down"	DJ Paul; Shawty Trap	3:09
17.	"No Panties"	DJ Paul; Gtown Vega	3:36
18.	"Witha Shit" (featuring Locodunit)	DJ Paul; Shawty Trap; Premo Danger (add.)	4:05
19.	"I'm There"	DJ Paul; J Green	3:36
20.	"Leggo"	DJ Paul; Shawty Trap	3:34
21.	"In My Zone"	DJ Paul; J Green; Premo Danger (add.)	3:29
22.	"I'm Sprung" (featuring Lil Wyte)	DJ Paul; Dream Drumz	3:08
23.	"My Best (My Pimpin)"	DJ Paul; J Green; Premo Danger (add.)	3:03
24.	"Brand New"	DJ Paul; Shawty Trap	2:42
25.	"Unstoppable"	DJ Paul	2:45
26.	"Outro"		1:26
Total length:			79:56

iTunes bonus tracks
No.	Title	Producer(s)	Length
27.	"Re-Up" (featuring Project Pat)	DJ Paul; Dream Drumz	3:15
28.	"King Shit"	DJ Paul; Shawty Trap	3:33
