= Underground Volume 16: For da Summa =

Studio album by DJ Paul
- Released: May 21, 2002
- Recorded: 1994–2002
- Studio: Hypnotize Minds Studio (Memphis, TN); D.J. Paul's Mama House (Memphis, TN)
- Genre: Memphis rap; crunk; gangsta rap; hardcore hip-hop
- Length: 51:52
- Label: Street Level; D'Evil; KOM; Hypnotize Minds
- Producer: DJ Paul (also exec.); Juicy J (also exec.)

DJ Paul chronology
Underground Volume 16: For da Summa (2002)	Scale-A-Ton (2009)

Professional ratings
Review scores
Source	Rating
AllMusic	3/5 stars

Underground Vol. 16: For da Summa is the first solo album by American rapper and record producer DJ Paul. It was released on May 21, 2002, through D'Evil Music, KOM Music, and Hypnotize Minds with distribution via Street Level. Recording sessions took place at Hypnotize Minds Studio and D.J. Paul's Mama House in Memphis. Production was handled entirely by DJ Paul and his Three 6 Mafia band mate Juicy J who also served as executive producer. It features guest appearances from fellow Prophet Posse/Hypnotize Camp Posse members Lord Infamous, Frayser Boy, Crunchy Black, La Chat, Juicy J and Project Pat. Chopped and screwed version of the album was remixed by DJ Black.

The album peaked at number 127 on the Billboard 200, number 24 Top R&B/Hip-Hop Albums, number 7 on the Independent Albums and number 2 on the Heatseekers Albums. The original masters of the originally recorded '94 album, Volume 16: 4 da Summer of '94, was released in 2013 and peaked at number 39 on the Heatseekers Albums.

The album's sequel, Underground Vol. 17: For da Summa, was released in 2017.

== Track listing ==
- All tracks produced by DJ Paul and Juicy J

No.	Title	Length
1.	"Back da Fuck Back" (featuring Lord Infamous and (Additional Vocals: La Chat)	3:25
2.	"Still Gettin My Dick Suck"	3:47
3.	"Kickin in Doe/I Think They Scared"	3:24
4.	"Cyoazzndalot" (featuring Project Pat)	3:20
5.	"Break da Law" (featuring Frayser Boy)	5:14
6.	"Flaugin Azz Niggas/Bitches" (featuring La Chat)	3:30
7.	"Glock in My Draws" (featuring Frayser Boy)	3:34
8.	"Where Is da Bud, Pt. 2" (featuring Lord Infamous)	5:35
9.	"Beat Down Intro" (featuring Lord Infamous)	0:49
10.	"Beatin These Hoes Down" (featuring Lord Infamous)	4:27
11.	"Twist It, Hit It, Lite It" (featuring Lord Infamous and Crunchy Black)	4:20
12.	"D.J. Paul"	4:26
13.	"King of Kings" (featuring Lord Infamous, La Chat, Juicy J, Frayser Boy and Crunchy Black)	4:32
14.	"Outro"	1:29
Total length:		51:52

== Chart history ==
Chart (2002)	Peak position
US Billboard 200	127
US Top R&B/Hip-Hop Albums (Billboard)	24
US Independent Albums (Billboard)	7
US Heatseekers Albums (Billboard)	2
