= Scale-A-Ton =

Scale-a-Ton (Skeleton)

Studio album by DJ Paul
- Released: May 5, 2009
- Recorded: 2008–09
- Studios: Scale-A-Ton Studios (Memphis, TN and Los Angeles, CA)
- Genres: Southern hip-hop; hardcore hip-hop; gangsta rap; underground hip-hop; horrorcore
- Labels: Scale-A-Ton Entertainment; Select-O-Hits; Hypnotize Minds
- Producer: DJ Paul (also exec.)

DJ Paul chronology
Underground Volume 16: For da Summa (2002)	Scale-a-Ton (Skeleton) (2009)	A Person of Interest (2012)

Professional ratings
Review scores
Source	Rating
AllMusic	3.5/5 stars
RapReviews	6.5/10

Scale-a-Ton (pronounced Skeleton) is the second solo studio album by American rapper and record producer DJ Paul. It was released on May 5, 2009, via Scale-A-Ton Entertainment/Hypnotize Minds. Recording sessions took place at Scale-A-Ton Studios in Memphis and Los Angeles. Production was handled entirely by DJ Paul, who also served as executive producer. It features guest appearances from Lord Infamous. The album debuted at number 157 on the Billboard 200 chart, selling 4,000 copies in its first week of sales.

== Background ==
On his official YouTube channel, (which was later reported on AllHipHop), Paul stated that his brother, original Three 6 Mafia member Lord Infamous, will be contributing to the upcoming album.

He helped build Three 6 Mafia, and create Three 6 Mafia… Lord was just going through some things, and he had to get that together. We got it together now. We’re going to be back in the lab working.

With partner Juicy J, DJ Paul played an important role in the South's rise within the rap industry. Three 6 Mafia has sold over 7 million records, plus another 5 million from their affiliated artists, and even won an Academy Award. This CD will be Paul's second official solo album, and features the singles "Jus Like Dat??" and "You Don't Want It", which are already receiving internet buzz.

== Information ==
Lord Infamous appears on eight tracks, and is the sole guest artist on the album. Most of the album consists of topics that fans are used to hearing Three 6 Mafia talking about already, such as shootouts, drugs, and the streets. One song, "Wanta Be Like You", however, is about how DJ Paul was inspired to get into music, stating that the accomplishments of singer Michael Jackson was his main influence.

== Track listing ==
No.	Title	Length
1.	"Get Right"	1:20
2.	"You On't Want It" (featuring Lord Infamous)	3:07
3.	"Doin All da Doin"	2:49
4.	"Stay wit Me"	3:12
5.	"Jus Like Dat???"	2:57
6.	"I Spoils"	3:01
7.	"She Wanta Get High" (featuring Lord Infamous)	3:03
8.	"Walk Like a Stripper"	2:57
9.	"Liquor & Powder"	2:57
10.	"Jook" (featuring Lord Infamous)	3:28
11.	"Bumpin"	3:04
12.	"Pop a Pill" (featuring Lord Infamous)	3:15
13.	"Fuckboy" (featuring Lord Infamous)	3:04
14.	"Wanta Be Like You"	3:55
15.	"Gotta Eat" (featuring Lord Infamous)	3:04
16.	"Dont Get Up on Me"	3:12
17.	"Ima Outlaw"	3:24
18.	"Internet Whore" (featuring Lord Infamous)	3:45
19.	"I'm Drunk" (featuring Lord Infamous)	4:15
20.	"I'm Alive"	0:53

== Personnel ==
- Paul Duane "DJ Paul" Beauregard – vocals, producer, mixing, executive producer, management
- Ricky T. "Lord Infamous" Dunigan – vocals (tracks: 2, 7, 10, 12, 13, 15, 18, 19)
- Michael "Crazy Mike" Foster – recording, mixing
- Kevin Nix – mastering

== Chart history ==
Chart (2009)	Peak position
US Billboard 200	157
US Top R&B/Hip-Hop Albums (Billboard)	26
US Independent Albums (Billboard)	22
