= Ashley Alexandra Dupré =

American call girl & entertainer (born 1985/1986)

Ashley Dupré
- Born: Ashley Youmans; 1985 or 1986 (age 40–41)
- Other names: Ashley DiPietro; Kristen
- Occupations: Call girl, entertainer
- Known for: Eliot Spitzer prostitution scandal
- Spouse: Thomas "TJ" Earle (m. 2013)
- Children: 3
- Relatives: Alix Earle (stepdaughter)

Ashley DiPietro (born Ashley Youmans; 1985 or 1986) also known by her stage name Ashley Alexandra Dupré, is a former call girl. She gained fame in 2008 for her role as "Kristen" in the Eliot Spitzer prostitution scandal, which led to the resignation of Eliot Spitzer as Governor of New York.

== Early life and education ==
Dupré spent her early childhood years in Beachwood, New Jersey, a borough near the Jersey Shore. Her father, William Youmans, owned a landscaping business and also worked as a salesman of surfing accessories. When her parents divorced, Dupré moved to Wall Township, New Jersey with her mother, Carolyn Capalbo, and her stepfather, Mike DiPietro, an oral surgeon. There, she attended Old Mill (elementary) School and Wall High School until her sophomore year, when she moved to Kill Devil Hills, North Carolina, to live with her father. On her MySpace page, Dupré described leaving home at age 17 to escape a broken family and abuse. However, her aunt, Barbara Youmans of Seaside Heights, denied that Dupré had a difficult childhood. "She never had a bad life when she was growing up. She had the best of everything: bicycles, clothing, O'Neill surf boards. ... She was always dressed to kill and got everything she wanted." Dupré also claimed that her brother ran away from home when he was 15.

In 2004, at the age of 19, Dupré moved to New York City in pursuit of a music career, and worked as a waitress at a dance club called Viscaya in the Chelsea district. She also worked at the clubs Pink Elephant and Retox. Jason Itzler, who ran a New York escort service called NY Confidential from 2003 to 2005, met Dupré while she was working as a cocktail waitress at the Hotel Gansevoort in 2004. Dupré began working for him on the side, using the alias Victoria. NY Confidential was shut down and Itzler sent to prison by Spitzer's New York State Attorney General's office in 2005.

In 2006, Dupré changed her legal name from Youmans to her stepfather's name of DiPietro, stating that she regarded him as "the only father I have known." By 2008, Dupré was living in a ninth-floor apartment in the Flatiron District of Manhattan. She maintains that she was concerned about her ability to pay her rent after the man she was living with left following her discovery that he had fathered two children.

== Media attention ==
=== February 2008 assignation with Spitzer ===
On February 13, 2008, Dupré travelled by Amtrak from New York Penn Station to Washington, D.C., for an assignation at the Mayflower Hotel with New York governor Eliot Spitzer. The arrangements had been made by phone between Spitzer and a booker at Emperors Club VIP, and were monitored by federal investigators who had initiated a wiretap after his bank had filed a suspicious activity report regarding money transfers by Spitzer to a front company operated by the escort service.

Caught on the FBI's wiretap was Dupré's response to the booker's mention of other escorts' difficulties with Spitzer. "I don't think he's difficult," said Dupré. "I mean it's just kind of like, whatever, I'm here for a purpose. I know what my purpose is. I am not a … moron, you know what I mean."

On March 6, federal authorities arrested four individuals involved with Emperors Club VIP, charging them under federal prostitution and money laundering laws. Initial news reports and court documents did not identify the agency's clients or call girls by name, referring to Spitzer as "Client 9" and to Dupré as "Kristen".

On March 10, The New York Times identified Spitzer as "Client 9." Two days later on March 12, the Times identified Dupré as "Kristen." Her mother, Carolyn Capalbo, told the newspaper that her daughter "was a young kid with typical teenage rebellion issues, but we are extremely close now." Capalbo said she was "shell-shocked" when her daughter called to tell her she had been working as a prostitute.

Dupré's only public comment was a brief interview with The New York Times for the March 12 story that revealed her identity. "I just don't want to be thought of as a monster," Dupré told the newspaper. "This has been a very difficult time. It's complicated." On the day the story broke, she posted a message to her MySpace page that said "Yeah, I did it"; it was later changed to read, "Thank you for your support, it means a lot to me." Dupré uploaded a second song to the Amie Street online music store around 2 a.m. on March 13. On March 14, New York City radio station Z100 played one Dupré song.

=== Aftermath ===
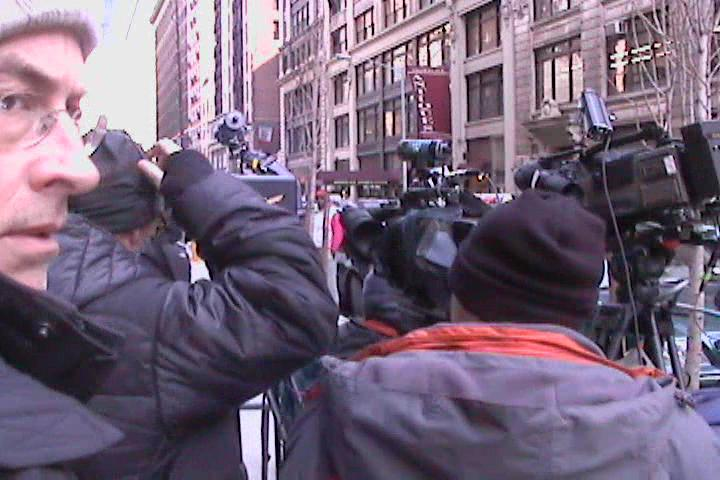
The media waited in vain outside Dupré's Manhattan apartment building the day after Spitzer's resignation

Dupré remained in seclusion in the days after her role in the scandal became public, and became the subject of increasingly intense media coverage. The Village Voice called her "the most famous hooker in America". By March 18, Dupré's profile on MySpace had received over 9 million page views. Dupré was reportedly offered US$1 million by Hustler magazine to pose nude, and received offers from Penthouse magazine and Vivid Entertainment.

On March 19, the soft porn website Girls Gone Wild featured teasers of Dupré, shot in Miami Beach, Florida, in 2003 before she had turned 18. Dupré presented the company the drivers license of a New Jersey woman named Amber Arpaio, claiming it was Dupré's own. Company founder Joe Francis—who served a year in jail for a conviction of child abuse and prostitution involving filming two underaged girls in Panama City, Florida, in 2003 who had represented themselves as adults—prepared to release a full DVD of Dupré footage from company archives. "All nude images of Ms. Dupre were taken in public places and contain no sexual contact," said Francis. "In Florida, where Ms. Dupre was filmed, the law allows even women under the age of 18 to be filmed nude with their consent."

Dupré's attorney, Don Buchwald, argued in an e-mail to Girls Gone Wild, "It was because she was underage that [Francis] sent her home on a Greyhound bus back to North Carolina. It would be outrageous at the very least to play the video of an underage female on the Internet."

On April 28, 2008, Dupré filed suit against Francis and two of his companies alleging their exploitation of Dupré's name and image, seeking US$10 million in punitive damages, but in July of that year she decided to drop the suit after Francis released footage showing her agreeing to be filmed.

In December 2009, Dupré started writing an advice column in the New York Post called "Ask Ashley". Her last column appeared in May 2012.

In January 2010, Dupré appeared on The Howard Stern Show, where she discussed incidents ranging from her situation as a rape victim to how she preoccupied her mind when engaged in intercourse with men she was not attracted to.

Dupré posed nude for the May 2010 issue of Playboy magazine.

=== Legal proceedings ===
On March 15, 2008, Dupré was granted immunity from prosecution by the United States Attorney for the Southern District of New York for her role in the Spitzer scandal, in order to testify at court hearings related to the Emperors Club VIP prostitution ring.

In July 2008, a woman named Amber Arpaio filed a federal lawsuit against Dupré for defamation and invasion of privacy, claiming Dupré used her lost driver's license to appear on a Girls Gone Wild video. Arpaio also sued Girls Gone Wild founder Joe Francis.

== Music career ==
"Unspoken Words"

Single by Ashley Dupré
- A-side: "What We Want"
- B-side: "Move Ya Body"
- Released: March 2008
- Genre: Dance-pop, R&B
- Length: 3:07; 3:27
- Label: Unsigned
- Songwriters: Nina Venetta a.k.a. Ashley Dupré
- Producers: Simon Ella for Unbreakable Music Group

Dupré began singing professionally when Jerry Cooper, a musician she was living with, heard her singing the Aretha Franklin version of the song "Respect" in the shower. "She had this huge voice for such a little girl," Cooper told MTV, "and so I just kind of went in and said, 'Hey, come upstairs when you're done with this, and let's work on some songs.'" According to Dupré, she then toured and recorded with Cooper's band, networking with people in the music industry. In 2005, she formed a company named Pasche New York, an entertainment business intended to promote her music career.

In the summer of 2006, she made an appearance in a music video for the song "Pop Off", performed by rapper Mysterious.

Shortly after The New York Times published their profile of Dupré, her single "Move Ya Body" set a record for how fast it commanded the top price on the music-download site AmieStreet.com, reaching the site's maximum of US$0.98 per download in five hours. Another single, "What We Want", was played more than 3 million times on the Internet after the scandal erupted. While some speculated that she may have earned as much as US$300,000–1.4 million from download sales of her singles on Amie Street, others estimated her earnings at as low as US$13,720. Dupré's music came to be featured in mash up YouTube videos, blending her tracks with those of established artists.

== Television career ==
On July 7, 2008, E! reported that Dupré was engaged in talks about a proposed reality show with Handprint Entertainment, the same firm that managed the reality television careers of Nicole Richie and Pamela Anderson, and that she was considering a move from New York to Los Angeles. One of the concepts reportedly being considered was a dating program similar to A Shot at Love with Tila Tequila. Dupré will reportedly be working with the production company Reveille Productions (responsible for the TV shows The Office and The Biggest Loser) to create a reality dating show based on the theme that everyone has skeletons in their closet.

Dupré appeared on 20/20 on Friday, November 21, 2008, where she was interviewed by Diane Sawyer about her feelings about being an "escort," and the emotional effect it had upon her when the encounter with Spitzer was made public.

On July 10, 2011, VH1 premiered Famous Food, a reality series featuring seven celebrities. Dupré came in third; first and second were given a partnership stake in the show's restaurant.

== Personal life ==
In 2013, Dupré married New Jersey construction magnate Thomas "TJ" Earle, the father of social media influencer Alix Earle. They have three children.
