= Eliot Spitzer prostitution scandal =

2008 scandal involving the Governor of New York

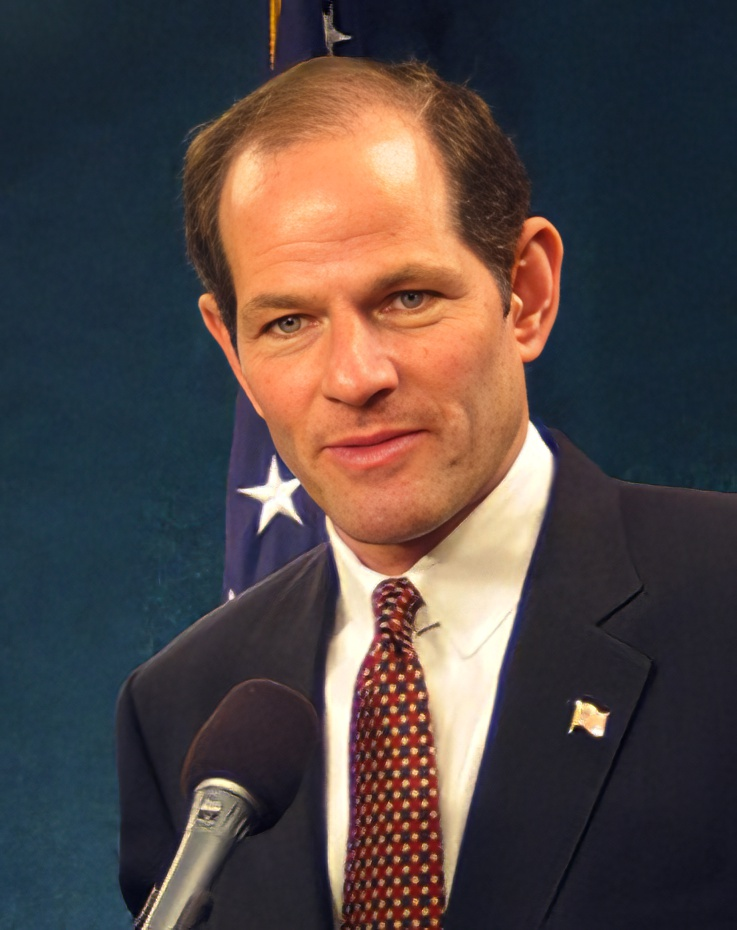
Eliot Spitzer in 2004

On March 10, 2008, The New York Times reported that Eliot Spitzer, Governor of New York, had patronized a prostitution ring run by an escort agency known as Emperors Club VIP. During the course of an investigation into the escort agency, the federal government became aware of Spitzer's involvement with prostitutes due to a wiretap. Following the public disclosure of his actions, Spitzer resigned as governor effective March 17, 2008.

== Emperors Club VIP ==
Emperors Club VIP
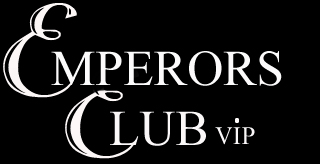
- Type: Private
- Industry: Sex trade
- Founded: 2004; 22 years ago
- Founders: Mark Brener; Cecil Suwal
- Defunct: March 11, 2008
- Fate: Cease and desist of a criminal enterprise
- Headquarters: New York City, U.S.
- Key people: Mark Brener; Cecil Suwal; Temeka Rachelle Lewis; Tanya Hollander.
- Products: Escorts, dating, prostitutes

Emperors Club VIP was an international escort agency based in New York City, founded in 2004 by Israeli national Mark Brener and his partner, Cecil Suwal and operated from the bank accounts of QAT Consulting Group, Inc., and QAT International, Inc.

Emperors Club VIP offered, via their internet website, the services of fifty escorts rated on a scale from three to seven diamonds for appointments in New York, Washington, Miami, London and Paris, with fees commensurate with their rating. Appointments could be made by telephone or online with fees from US$1,000 to US$5,500 per hour, payable by cash, credit card, money order or wire transfer. A top-rated seven-diamond model could cost as much as US$31,000 per day.

The agency was shut down in March 2008 following a federal investigation into suspicious money transfers.

=== Alleged clients ===
- New York governor Eliot Spitzer was identified as having procured services in excess of US$80,000 from Emperors Club VIP over a period of two years. After campaigning on promises of ethics and integrity, and himself having prosecuted prostitution rings in his career, Spitzer was forced to resign as governor amid charges of hypocrisy and threats of impeachment.
- The United Kingdom's then 3rd wealthiest man, Gerald Grosvenor, 6th Duke of Westminster, was alleged by former Emperors Club VIP escort Zana Brazdek to have engaged her services through the company. Attorneys responding on his behalf hold that the Duke was not in London on the dates she reports.

== Investigations ==
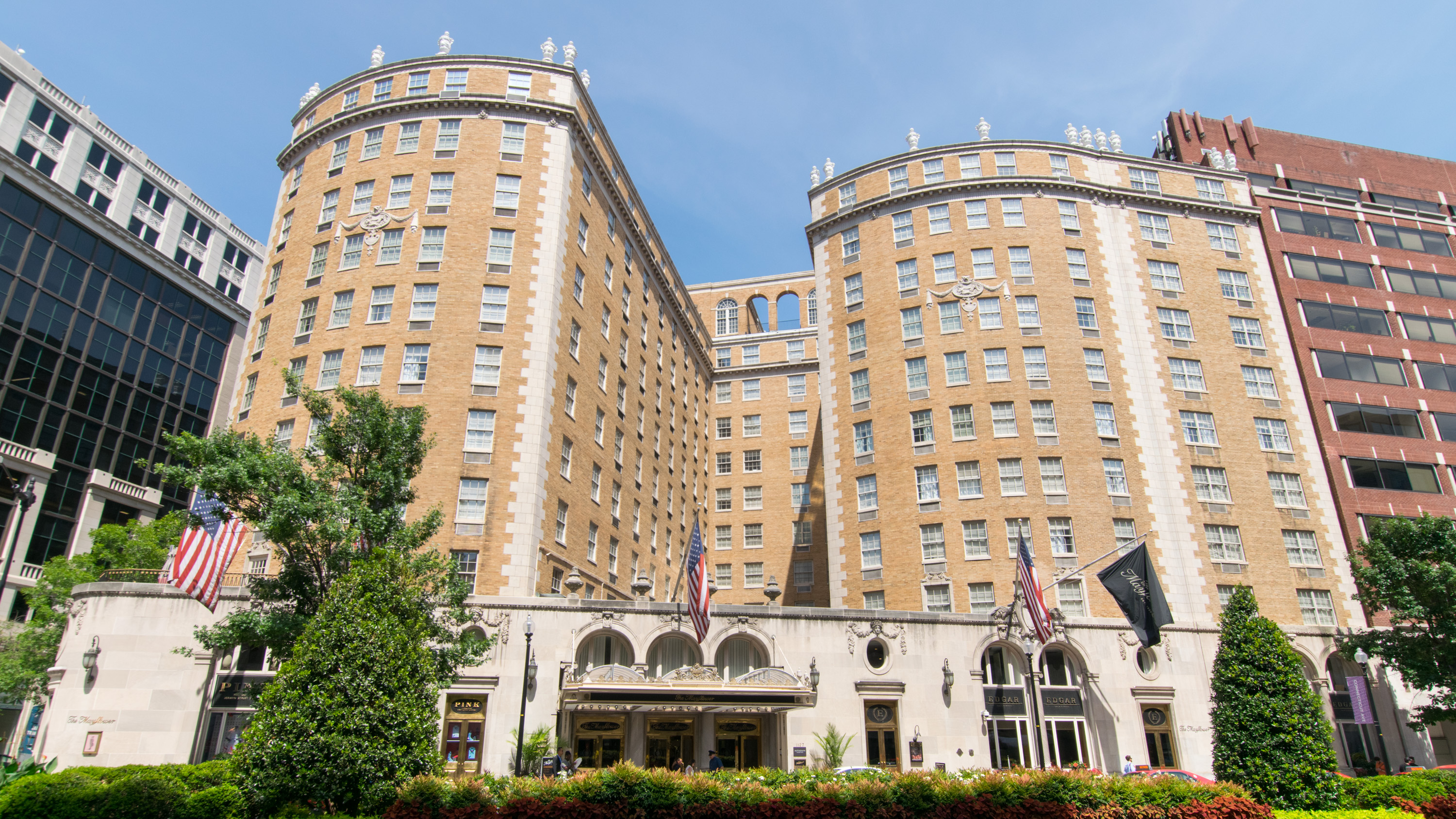
The Mayflower Hotel in Washington.

The investigation of Spitzer was initiated after North Fork Bank reported suspicious transactions to the Treasury Department's Financial Crimes Enforcement Network as required by the Bank Secrecy Act, which was enhanced by Patriot Act provisions, enacted to combat terrorist activity such as money laundering. Spitzer had at least seven liaisons with prostitutes from the Emperors Club over six months, and paid more than $15,000 for their services. Federal agents had him under surveillance twice in 2008. According to published reports, investigators believe Spitzer paid up to $80,000 for prostitutes over a period of several years – first while he was attorney general, and later as governor.

Governor Spitzer, referred to as "Client 9" in an affidavit filed in US Federal Court, arranged to meet at the Mayflower Hotel in Washington on February 13, 2008, with a prostitute named "Kristen". "Kristen" was later identified as 22-year-old Ashley Dupré. She intended to travel from New York City for the planned tryst and Spitzer agreed in advance that he "would be paying for everything—train tickets, cab fare from the hotel and back, mini-bar or room service, travel time and hotel". After the meeting on February 13, 2008, Spitzer paid her $4,300 in cash. The payment included $1,100 as a deposit toward future services to be provided by the Emperors Club.

Room 871 at the Mayflower Hotel was booked under the name George Fox, a pseudonym that was allegedly the name of his close friend, a hedge fund investor. Some of this information came to light from a United States Department of Justice wiretap.

According to Newsday, Spitzer wanted to transfer more than $10,000 to a front company for the prostitution ring. However, he broke up the transactions into smaller slices due to federal law requiring the reporting of any transfer of $10,000 or more. When he tried to get his name taken off the wires, the bank refused, saying that the money had already been wired out and that it would be improper to do so in any case. The IRS Criminal Investigation Division then began a probe, initially fearing that Spitzer was the victim of either extortion or identity theft.

North Fork's report in July 2007 went largely unnoticed until HSBC filed a report in the fall that the transactions were going to QAT International and QAT Consulting Group, which were offshore shell companies operating as a front for the Emperors Club VIP.

Later, the IRS contacted the FBI to investigate possible political corruption. The investigation led federal authorities to link the money transfers to the Emperors Club. Prosecutors charged the four people operating the escort service with violations of the Mann Act several days prior to the revelations of Spitzer's involvement.

In November 2008, the Department of Justice declined to prosecute Spitzer for violating the Mann Act.

== Public disclosure and resignation ==
On March 7, 2008, The New York Times reported that the federal government had arrested four people in connection with an international online prostitution ring run by Emperors Club VIP.

On March 10, the Times reported that Spitzer had been "caught on a federal wiretap arranging to meet with a high-priced prostitute at a Washington hotel". Spitzer was identified as "Client 9", and the Times stated that he had met with a prostitute from Emperors Club VIP at a Washington, D.C. hotel.

Later on March 10, Spitzer held a press conference. At that time, he said:

I have acted in a way that violates my obligation to my family and violates my or any sense of right and wrong. I apologize first and most importantly to my family. I apologize to the public to whom I promised better. I have disappointed and failed to live up to the standard I expected of myself. I must now dedicate some time to regain the trust of my family.

Following Spitzer's March 10 press conference, New York State Assembly Republican Minority Leader James Tedisco and Republican New York Congressman Peter King separately called for his resignation. Tedisco later announced that he would initiate impeachment proceedings in the State Assembly if Spitzer did not resign. Spitzer's office and the U.S. Attorney for the Southern District of New York declined to comment, except to say that "There is no agreement between this office and Gov. Eliot Spitzer, relating to his resignation or any other matter."

In the wake of the revelations, and amid threats of impeachment, Spitzer announced on March 12, 2008, that he would resign his post as governor at noon on March 17, 2008. Spitzer said at a news conference in Manhattan:

I cannot allow for my private failings to disrupt the people's work. Over the course of my public life, I have insisted—I believe correctly—that people take responsibility for their conduct. I can and will ask no less of myself. For this reason, I am resigning from the office of governor.

Spitzer's lieutenant governor, David Paterson, succeeded him as Governor of New York and served the remaining three years of Spitzer's four-year term.

== Reactions ==
Spitzer's prostitution scandal became international news.

The real George Fox, who is a close friend and campaign donor of Spitzer, issued a statement denying any connection to the scandal beyond the unauthorized use of his name. He said that he was "disappointed and distressed" that Spitzer had used his name as an alias, and confirmed that Spitzer privately apologized to him.

According to Nell Minow, a corporate-governance expert, Wall Street reaction to the scandal was largely positive, due to a general dislike of Spitzer amongst investment professionals. Governor Spitzer made his rise to victory in New York City politics promising "ethics and integrity to be the hallmarks of [his] administration." He had prosecuted several prostitution rings in his career, and his connection with a prostitution ring was felt as a betrayal by some women's rights and anti-human trafficking groups that had previously worked with him.

In an editorial reflecting on the scandal, philosopher Martha Nussbaum wrote "Spitzer's offense was an offense against his family. It was not an offense against the public. If he broke any laws, these are laws that never should have existed and that have been repudiated by sensible nations."

In 2011, The Guardian summarized Spitzer's history as follows:

Long before there was Barack Obama there was Spitzer. While Obama toiled unknown in Illinois, the Bronx-born Spitzer won himself a national reputation as the "Sheriff of Wall Street". He was New York's tough-talking attorney-general, who fought banking corruption, enforced environment law and won rights for low-paid workers. He used that fame to enter politics and in 2006 became governor of New York: a perfect springboard for the White House. Before America fell in love with its first black president, people wondered if it was willing to embrace its first Jewish one. Spitzer could have made history.

Instead he left office in disgrace three years ago amid a flood of tabloid headlines that recounted salacious details from his repeated use of a high-end escort service. Spitzer was dubbed the "Luv Guv" and forced into a political wilderness. Rarely in American politics was a fall from grace so spectacular, so complete and so clearly down to a self-inflicted human flaw.

— Paul Harris

== "Kristen" ==
"Kristen", 22, was an aspiring pop recording artist living in Manhattan whose professional stage name is Ashley Dupré. She was just one of the escorts that Spitzer had liaisons with, but she gained significant media attention following the scandal. After the news broke, she responded that she did not "want to be thought of as a monster", and that it had been a "difficult" and "complicated" time for her.

As a result of the media attention following the scandal, Dupré was offered $1 million by Hustler to pose nude for the magazine, and received unofficial offers from Penthouse, among others. She eventually agreed to pose for Playboy in the May 2010 issue.

== Political impact ==
Overseas, Gerald Cavendish Grosvenor, 6th Duke of Westminster was a high-profile casualty of the scandal when Emperors Club prostitutes alleged that he had been a client. The allegations were followed by Grosvenor stepping down as Assistant Chief of the Defence Staff (Reserves and Cadets) in the British Ministry of Defence.

=== 2013 New York City Comptroller election ===
Both Spitzer and Kristin M. Davis, another madam caught in the prostitution scandal but unaffiliated with the Emperors Club VIP, ran for New York City Comptroller in 2013. Davis won the Libertarian Party nomination, but later withdrew from the race following a drug arrest. There was some debate as to whether or not Spitzer's name recognition would help him in the election. Spitzer lost the Democratic primary to Scott Stringer, 52.1–47.9%.

== Depictions in media ==
- The scandal was the subject of Alex Gibney's 2010 documentary Client 9: The Rise and Fall of Eliot Spitzer. A rough cut of the film was first shown on April 24, 2010, at the Tribeca Film Festival and the final version was screened at the 2010 Toronto International Film Festival.
- "Major Boobage", the March 26, 2008 episode of the animated sitcom South Park, parodies the Eliot Spitzer prostitution scandal.
- The law drama The Good Wife, which premiered in September 2009, was inspired in part by the scandal.
